= There'll Be Some Changes Made =

1921 popular song

Song
- Language: English
- Published: 1921 Harry H. Pace; 1924 Edward B. Marks Music Corporation
- Composer: Benton Overstreet
- Lyricist: Billy Higgins

"There'll Be Some Changes Made" ("Changes") is a popular song by Benton Overstreet (composer) and Billy Higgins (Note: Some biographical references, notably the searchable BMI Song Database, incorrectly identify the lyricist as William Blackstone. The copyrights, and copyright renewals, credit Higgins as the lyricist. "Blackstone" is the maiden name of the mother of another Billy Higgins (1936–2001) — the late jazz drummer who has no direct relationship to the Higgins of this article. The mother's full maiden name was Anna Bell Marie Blackstone (1903–2001). She was married to Samuel Higgins (1901–1970). ("Higgins, Billy" – reference entry; the "other" Billy Higgins), Oxford Index: American National Biography Online; retrieved November 22, 2016) ("BMI Repertoire Song Search: ' There'll Be Some Changes Made' ;" Archived 2006-11-24 at the Wayback Machine retrieved November 22, 2016)) (lyricist). Published in 1921, the song has flourished in several genres, particularly jazz. The song has endured for as many years as a jazz standard. According to the online The Jazz Discography (an index of jazz-only recordings), "Changes" had been recorded 404 times as of May 2018. The song and its record debut were revolutionary, in that the songwriters (Overstreet and Higgins, the original copyright publisher, Harry Herbert Pace, the vocalist to first record it (Ethel Waters), the owners of Black Swan (the record label), the opera singer (Elizabeth Greenfield) for whom the label was named, and the musicians on the recording led by Fletcher Henderson, were all African American. The production is identified by historians as a notable part of the Harlem Renaissance.

== History and popularity milestones ==
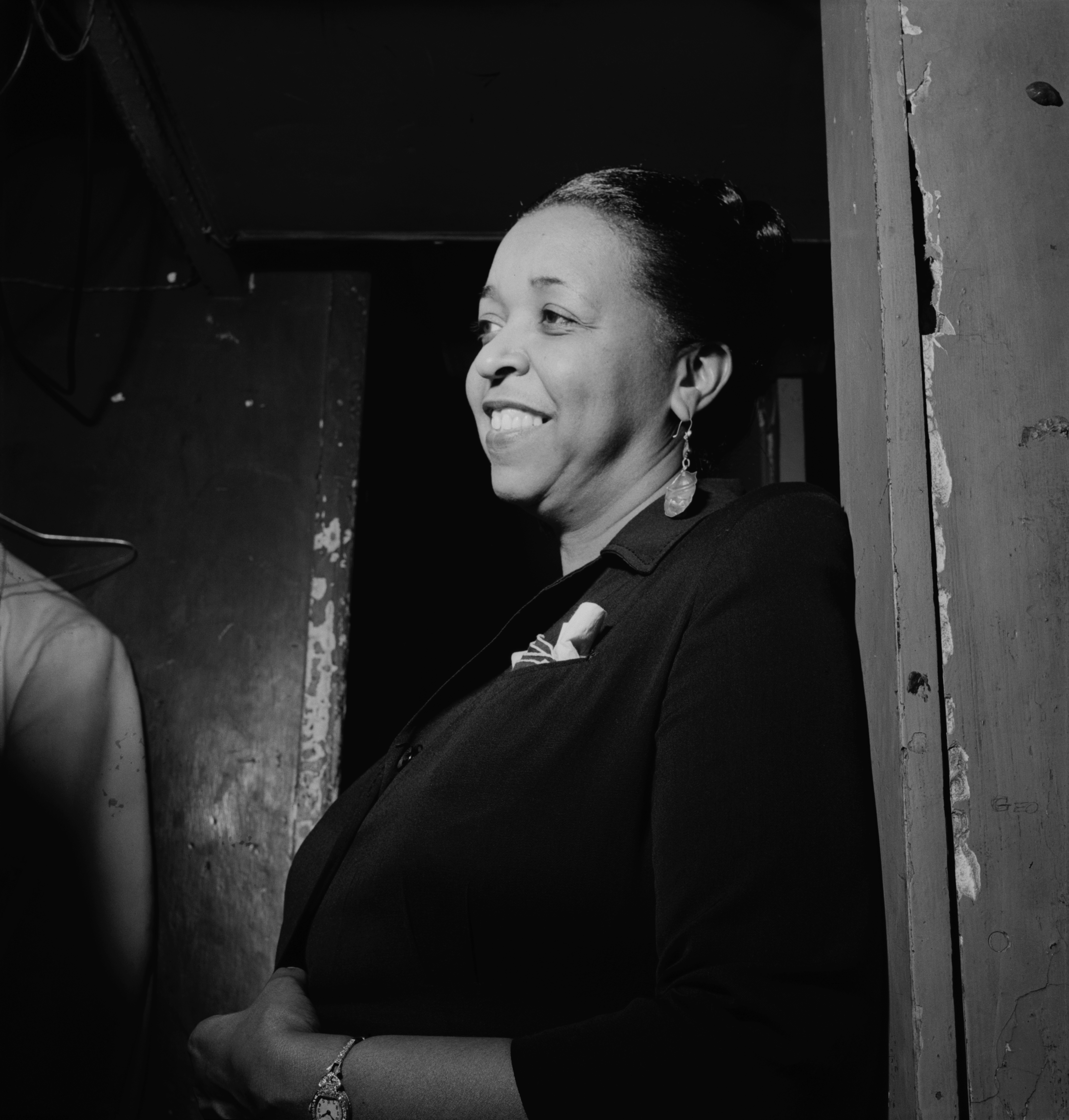
Ethel Waters (between 1938 and 1948) (photo: William P. Gottlieb)

=== 1920s ===
The debut recording with Ethel Waters was recorded on Black Swan Records (1921) and rapidly became a hit. Her rendition features the rarely-heard 6-bar instrumental intro, (Note: Published versions of the music include a 4-bar intro, followed by a 2-bar vamp. The Ethel Waters rendition does not repeat the vamp. Her rendition is: B♭ major — 4/4 time Intro, instrumental (4 bars; plus a 2-bar, non-repeated vamp) 1st verse, sung (16 bars; plus 1) or ("A_{1} theme," 8 bars; plus "A_{2} theme," 8 bars; plus 1) 1st chorus, sung (16 bars; plus 2) or ("B_{1} theme," 8 bars; plus "B_{2} theme," 8 bars; plus 2) 1st chorus, instrumental (8 bars) ("B_{2} theme," 8 bars; plus 2) 1st verse, sung (16 bars; plus 1) or ("A_{1} theme," 8 bars; plus "A_{2} theme," 8 bars; plus 1)) followed by her singing the 1st verse (16 bars, plus 1), then her singing the 1st chorus (16 bars, plus 2), then instruments playing 8, plus 2 bars of the chorus, finishing with her singing the 1st chorus (16 bars, plus 2).

Variety magazine, in a fifty-year commemorative issue, included Ethel Waters' recording in its "Hit Parade of a Half-Century (1905–1955)" list for 1923. A 1924 recording by Marion Harris (Brunswick 2651) helped establish it as a standard. Other artists with notable recordings during the 1920s include Josie Miles (Ajax 17087; 1924), Sophie Tucker (Okeh 40921; 1927), and the Chicago Rhythm Kings (Red McKenzie, vocalist; Brunswick 4001; 1928). In jazz discography, which does not include the recordings of Marion Harris or Sophie Tucker, there were 11 recordings of the song during the 1920s.

=== 1930s ===
Standout recordings from the 1930s include Fats Waller (Bluebird B10322; 1935), Pee Wee Russell's Rhythmakers (HRS (de) 1000; 1938), and Benny Goodman and His Orchestra (Louise Tobin, vocalist, Fletcher Henderson arrangement; Columbia 35210; 1939). In jazz discography, there were 17 recordings of the song during the 1930s, including double takes by (i) Benny Carter and His Swing Quintet (Masters of Jazz (F)MJCD95 CD & Vocalion S46), (ii) Pee Wee Russell's Rhythmakers (both takes on HRS 1001; 1938), (iii) Benny Goodman And His Orchestra (Columbia 35210 & Phontastic (Swd)NOST7606; 1939), and (iv) Eddie Condon And His Chicagoans (Decca 18041 & Meritt 11; 1939).

=== 1940s ===
1941 was not a good year for newly published popular music due to the ASCAP strike. According to a January 31, 1942, Billboard article, ASCAP members claimed only 2 of the top 13 sellers in sheet music. Five of the remaining 11 were revivals, one of which was "There'll Be Some Changes Made." The 1941 film, Play Girl, gave new life to the song. In 1941, Benny Goodman's 1939 version became a Billboard No. 1 Hit for 4 weeks (during April and May) and peaked at No. 2 on Your Hit Parade. In 1961, BMI published a list, "All-Time Hit Songs, Broadcast Music, Inc., 1940–1960," in Billboard. "There'll Be Some Changes Made" was among the 17 songs listed for 1947. In jazz discography, there were 60 recordings of the song during the 1940s.

Notable recordings from the 1940s include Vaughn Monroe and His Orchestra (Marilyn Duke, vocalist; Bluebird B-11025-A; 1941), the Hoosier Hot Shots (Okeh 6114; 1941) and Peggy Lee (Capitol 15001; 1947).

=== 1950s ===
In early 1959, Billie Holiday did three sessions with Ray Ellis and orchestra for MGM Records in New York: March 3, 4, and 11. She recorded "Changes" in the final session. That session turned out to be the last studio session of her life. She died 4 months and 6 days later — on July 17. The album — released under various titles, notably, Last Recording (MGM SE-3764; 1959) — was posthumously released.

In jazz discography, there were 42 recordings of "Changes" during the 1950s.

=== 1960s – current ===
Notable artists who recorded "Changes" include Ann-Margret on her 1962 album The Vivacious One, Jaki Byard (Muse 5007; 1972), Tony Bennett (Improv 7112; 1973–1977) and Fox Face (Dirtnap Records ZZZ-163; 2021)

=== 2000 ===
In 2004, Tony Bennett sang the song again at the Montreux Jazz Festival with the Phil Collins Big Band accompanied by pianist Ralph Sharon and double bassist Douglas Richeson, which can be heard on Collins's four-CD box set Plays Well with Others released in 2018.

=== Western swing and country western ===
Outside of jazz, in western swing, Bob Wills recorded it in 1937 (Vocalion DAL 244-1). In country music, Chet Atkins and Mark Knopfler recorded — on their 1990 Grammy award winning album Neck and Neck — a parody version that references the Dire Straits song "Money for Nothing" ...

Money for nothin' and chicks for free

== Selected videography, filmography, and stage ==
Feature films

- Use of the song in the 1941 film, Play Girl, helped repopularize the song 20 years after its debut.
- Ida Lupino sang the song in the 1948 film, Road House
- Joan Blondell sang the song in the 1951 film, The Blue Veil
- In the 1972 film Slaughterhouse-Five, a quartet is singing the song when the airplane Billy Pilgrim is traveling in spins out of control and crashes.
- Ann Reinking sang and danced to the song, accompanied by Leland Palmer and Erzsébet Földi during the "Hallucination Sequence" in the 1979 film, All That Jazz, directed by Bob Fosse. Reinking, Fosse's previous partner, directs the song to Roy Scheider playing Joe Gideon, a semi-autobiographical version of Fosse himself.
- The soundtrack of Woody Allen's 1999 film, Sweet and Lowdown, included "There'll Be Some Changes Made," recorded by members of the film's music department: Howard Alden, solo guitar, Bucky Pizzarelli, rhythm guitar, Ken Peplowski, clarinet, Kelly Friesen, bass, and Ted Sommer, drums. In the scene, Emmet Ray, played by Sean Penn in the lead role as a guitarist, is playing the song with his quintet at a club as he is approached by a woman with black hair.

Shorts

- The 1928 Vitaphone short film, Character Studies (Vitaphone 2734), directed by Murry Roth, featured three songs, including "Changes," all sung by Florence Brady (née Florence E. McAleer; born approx. 1902), a comedian, singer, vaudeville actress, and longtime stage partner with her songwriter husband, Gilbert William Wells (1893–1935).

== Selected discography ==
1. Ethel Waters, accompanied by Her Jazz Masters
  Trumpet (unknown), trombone (unknown), Garvin Bushell (clarinet), possibly Charlie Jackson (violin), Fletcher Henderson (piano)
  Recorded around August 1921, New York
  (audio on YouTube)
  Black Swan 2021
  Matrix P147-1
  OCLC 244487936
2. Josie Miles
  With the Choo Choo Jazzers
  Josie Miles (vocals), Bob Fuller (clarinet), Louis Hooper (piano)
  Recorded circa December 1924, New York City
  (audio on YouTube) Ajax (Canadian Race label) 17087
  Matrix 31749
3. Sophie Tucker
  Recorded September 3, 1927
  (audio on YouTube)
  Matrix W81314-B
  Okeh 40921
  OCLC 82134484
4. Chicago Rhythm Kings
  Red McKenzie (singer), Muggsy Spanier (clarinet), Frank Teschmacher (clarinet), Mezz Mezzrow (tenor sax), Joe Sullivan (piano), Eddie Condon (banjo), James W. Lanigan (1902–1983) (tuba), Gene Krupa (drums)
  Recorded April 6, 1928, Chicago
  Brunswick 4001
  Re-release: Classic Jazz Masters 31
  OCLC 29747177, 18799565
5. Boswell Sisters
  Mannie Klein (trumpet), Tommy Dorsey (trombone), Jimmy Dorsey (clarinet, alto sax), Babe Russin (tenor sax), Martha Boswell (piano, cello), Eddie Lang (guitar), Artie Bernstein (bass), Stan King (de) (drums)
  Recorded March 21, 1932, New York City
  (audio on YouTube)
  Matrix: 11543-A
  Brunswick 6291
  OCLC 399677888
6. Roy Newman (de) and His Boys
  Recorded October 1, 1935, Dallas
  Roy Newman (piano), Jim Boyd (born 1914) (brother of musician Bill Boyd brother) (guitar), Earl Brown (guitar), Ish Erwin (bass), Holly Horton (1892–1944) (clarinet), Walter Kirks (tenor banjo), Randall "Buddy" Neal (guitar), Thurman Neal (fiddle)
  Matrix: DAL-196-1
  Vocalion 03325
7. Bob Wills (1937)
  Recorded June 1937, Dallas
  03902 Vocalion
  (audio on YouTube)
  Matrix DAL 244-1 (1st take)
  OCLC 58807446
8. Benny Goodman
  Louise Tobin, vocalist
  Arrangement by Fletcher Henderson
  Recorded August 10, 1939, Los Angeles
  (audio on YouTube)
  Columbia 35210
  Matrix LA-1947-A
  (first of 2 takes)
  OCLC 698390892, 29063454
9. Eddie Condon
  and His Chicagoans
  (instrumental, no vocals)
  Max Kaminsky (trumpet), Brad Gowans (trombone), Pee Wee Russell (clarinet), Bud Freeman (tenor sax), Joe Sullivan (piano), Eddie Condon (guitar), Clyde Newcombe (bass), Dave Tough (drums)
  Recorded August 11, 1939, New York City
  Matrix – 66072-A: "There'll Be Some Changes Made"
  Matrix – 66072-B: "There'll Be Some Changes Made"
  66072-A: Decca 18041
  66072-B: Meritt 11
  OCLC 237626194
  OCLC 8778723
10. Art Tatum
  Recorded live July 26 or 27, 1941, at Gee-Haw Stables, New York City
  Art Tatum (piano), Chocolate Williams (bass)
  Ollie Potter (vocalist) (born 1900 – DOD not known)
  (audio on YouTube)
  Onyx ORI205
  Track 8 of 8
  OCLC 41634272
  (see note: †)
11. Vaughn Monroe and His Orchestra
  Recorded January 13, 1941
  (audio on YouTube)
  Marylin Duke (vocalist)
  Bobby Nichols (né Robert J. Nichols; 1924–1975) (trumpet solo)
  Bluebird B-11025-A
  Side A (matrix 060317=1)
  OCLC 80421652
12. Peggy Lee
  With Frank de Vol's Orchestra
  Recorded August 14, 1947, Los Angeles
  (audio on YouTube)
  Matrix: 2162 Y
  Capitol 15001-B
  OCLC 78100963, 725622274
13. Hy-Lo Trio (vocals and instrumentalist)
  78 rpm album:
  Old Tyme Favourites
  Recorded around 1948, Boston
  Vinnie "Jimmy Cal" Calderone (accordion)
  Angelo Boncore
  (né Angelo Joseph Boncore; 1919–2012) (bass)
  Side B, Track 3
  Label:
  Crystal-Tone (Boston)
  Re-issue:
  Family Library of Recorded Music (Canada)
  (audio on YouTube)
  1007-B
  Library and Archives Canada - Amicus #3573505
14. Dinah Washington
  On the album:
  Dinah!
  Recorded November 11, 1955, Los Angeles
  (audio on YouTube) Hal Mooney, arranger
  Accompanied by Maynard Ferguson, Conrad Gozzo, Ray Linn, Mannie Klein (trumpets); Tommy Pederson, Frank Rosolino, Si Zentner (trombones); Herb Geller, Skeets Herfurt (alto saxes); Georgie Auld, Babe Russin (tenor saxes); Chuck Gentry (né Charles Thomas Gentry; 1911–1987) (bari sax); Wynton Kelly (piano); Al Hendrickson (de) (guitar); Keter Betts (bass); Jimmy Cobb (drums); Harold "Hal" Mooney (director)
  Matrix 12401-4
  EmArcy MG36065
  OCLC 10801888, 25107940
15. Soundtrack
  From the 1957 film
  Designing Woman
  Album title: Miss Dolores Gray:
  Legendary Star of Stage and Screen
  (video on YouTube)'
  Blue Pear Records 1014
  OCLC 21720972
16. Billie Holiday
  Billie Holiday With Ray Ellis And His Orchestra
  Accompanied by Harry "Sweets" Edison (trumpet), Joe Wilder (trumpet), Billy Byers (trombone), Al Cohn (tenor sax), Danny Bank (bari sax), Hank Jones (piano), Barry Galbraith (guitar), Milt Hinton (bass), Osie Johnson (drums), Ray Ellis (arranger, conductor)
  Recorded March 11, 1959
  (audio on YouTube)
  59XY445: "There'll Be Some Changes Made"
  MGM SE-3764
  Verve (E)2304120
  OCLC 6871512 (MGM)
17. Dave Brubeck
  Brubeck and Rushing
  Recorded January 29, 1960, New York City
  (audio on YouTube)
  Paul Desmond (alto sax), Dave Brubeck (piano), Eugene Wright (bass), Joe Morello (drums), Jimmy Rushing (vocals)
  Matrix: CO64697
  Columbia CL1553
  OCLC 27683846, 717201596
18. Julie London
  Whatever Julie Wants (LP)
  With orchestra
  Felix Slatkin (conductor)
  Recorded in Hollywood, c., July 1961
  Track B5: "There'll Be Some Changes Made"
  (audio on YouTube)
  Liberty LST 7192 (LP) US (1961)
  Liberty LRP 3192 (LP, Mono) Australia (1961)
  7" Reel, 4tr, Stereo, Album, Liberty LT 7192 US (1961)
  Promo, Whi, Liberty LRP 3192 (LP, Mono) US (1961)
  Longon HA-G 2405 (LP, Mono) UK (1961)
  OCLC 12415639
19. Jackie Gleason
  Recorded 1961; released 1962
  Jackie Gleason's Lover's Portfolio
  Capitol SWBO-1619
  2 LPs (compilation)
  Track B1 (of side A, B, C, D)
  OCLC 27225822
20. Tony Bennett
  On the album:
  Life Is Beautiful
  Arranged by Torrie Zito
  Recorded 1975
  (audio on YouTube)
  Tony Bennett (vocals), Torrie Zito (piano), John Guiffrida (bass), Chuck Hughes (drums), and orchestra
  Improv 7112
  OCLC 38224976
21. Soundtrack (New York)
  Recorded March 22, 1976, A & R Recording, New York
  Original Broadway Cast from:
  Bubbling Brown Sugar
  H&L HL-69011-698
  Act 2, Scene 3
  Track B4
  Josephine Premice, vocalist
  OCLC 2940725
  Amherst Records AMH 3310 (CD)
  OCLC 15688755, 42552255
22. Soundtrack (London)
  London Cast from:
  Bubbling Brown Sugar
  Act 2, Scene 3
  Released 1977
  Elaine Delmar, vocalist
  H&L HL-69011-698
  OCLC 2940725
  Pye (CD)
  OCLC 299178203
23. Duke Ellington Orchestra
  Mercer Ellington, director
  Bruce Miller, arranger
  A Tribute To Ethel Waters
  Recorded 1978, Hollywood
  (audio-1 & audio-2 on YouTube)
  Diahann Carroll (vocals)
  Orinda ORC4000
  OCLC 5523457
24. Chet Atkins and Mark Knopfler
  Neck and Neck (album)
  Released October 9, 1990
  (audio on YouTube)
  Columbia
  OCLC 22689013
25. Celebrating Mildred Bailey and Red Norvo
  Recorded April 21, 22, 23, 1996, Doppler Studios, Atlanta
  (audio on YouTube)
  Audiophile ACD-295 (CD)
  Daryl Sherman (vocals, piano), Randy Sandke (trumpet), Randy Reinhart (trombone), Bobby Gordon (de) (clarinet, tenor sax), John Cocuzzi (vibes, leader), Mark Shane (piano), James Chirillo (guitar), Greg Cohen (bass), Joe Ascione (drums)
  OCLC 593772313, 873490877
26. Soundtrack
  Woody Allen's 1999 film
  Sweet and Lowdown
  Byron Stripling (trumpet), Ken Peplowski (clarinet), Dick Hyman (piano), Howard Alden (solo guitar), Bucky Pizzarelli (rhythm guitar), Kelly Friesen (bass), Ted Sommer (drums)
  Recorded in Hollywood, 1999
  Track 5: "There'll Be Some Changes Made"
  Sony Classical SK89019 (CD)
  OCLC 43482586
27. Scott Hamilton
  Live in Bern: Scott Hamilton & Jeff Hamilton Trio
  Live at Marian's Jazzroom, Bern, Switzerland, May 18, 2014
  (audio on YouTube)
  Scott Hamilton (tenor sax), Tamir Hendelman (piano), Christoph Luty (bass), Jeff Hamilton (drums)
  Track 7: "There'll Be Some Changes Made"
  Capri 74139-2 (CD)
  OCLC 925908072

Unreleased recordings

28. Duke Ellington and his Orchestra
  Live: June 1, 1957, Sunset Ballroom
  Near Carrolltown, Pennsylvania
  Shorty Baker (trumpet), Quentin Jackson (trombone), Russell Procope (clarinet), Duke Ellington (piano), Joe Benjamin (bass), Sam Woodyard (drums)

Notes on the Tatum recording

† "There'll Be Some Changes Made," was recorded in 1941 on acetate discs by an amateur, a Columbia Student, Jerry Newman (né Jerome Robert Newman; 1918–1970), and released in the 1973. Newman's collection was the initial sole material used to launch the jazz label, Onyx Recording, Inc. (aka Onyx Records), a New York entity co-founded in 1972 by Don Schlitten and Joe Fields.

Newman, (Note: Bill Fox (aka Bill Mink, Bill Wolf/Wolfe), Jerry Newman (né Jerome Robert Newman; 1918–1970), and Seymour Weiss (né Seymour Michael Wyse; born 1923 in London) founded the Esoteric Record Corporation in 1949 in New York. In 1957, the label was renamed Counterpoint; and after being first sold to Eichler Records Corporation in 1960, and then to Everest Record Group in 1963, to Counterpoint / Esoteric Records. Earlier, in 1948, Newman and Wyse founded Greenwich Music Shop. In 1964, Fox moved to Vanguard Records, to become the production coordinator. Fox had been Newman's business partner with the Greenwich Music Shop) while a student at Columbia in 1941, lugged his acetate disc recording machine – a portable Wilcox-Gay Recordio "disc cutter" – to jazz clubs in Harlem, including Minton's Playhouse on 118th Street and Clark Monroe's Uptown House on 134th Street, both of which were incubators of jazz of the day, and in 1941, the beginning of bebop. Newman's collection served as the core library for Onyx Recording, Inc. Art Tatum at Minton's in 1941, issued by Onyx after being declined by Columbia, on the LP God Is in the House. At the 16th Annual Grammy Awards held in March 1974, the album won two Grammys, one for Best Improvised Jazz Solo and one for Best Liner Notes, written by Morgenstern. Newman's recordings have been issued as unauthorized records, variously over the years; that is, none were done so with the permission or participation of the artists or their estates. The commercial value of the recordings was deemed nil; and those who acquired and distributed the recordings viewed the mission as one of curating jazz history.

The Art Tatum session at Gee-Haw Stables, later, became the subject of a poem, "Art Tatum at the Gee-Haw Stables," by Grace Schulman.

== Selected rollography (player pianos) ==
1. MelOdee 1257
  Melodee Music Co., Inc.
2. QRS 7389
  February 1941
  Fats Waller, piano roll artist
3. QRS Word Roll 8316
  J. Lawrence Cook, piano roll artist
  (audio on YouTube)
4. Aeolian 1741
  J. Lawrence Cook, piano roll artist

== Copyrights ==
Original copyright
"There'll Be Some Change Made" (sic ... "Change" vs. "Changes")
Billy Wiggins (pseudonym of William Higgins) (words)
Benton Overstreet (music)
Fletcher Hamilton Henderson Jr. (arrangement)
© 16 September 1921 (1 c.) E519207
New York: Harry Herbert Pace (Note: Vol. 16, Part 2, Last Half of 1921, Nos. 8–13 (1922), pg. 1309)

Subsequent copyrights
© 17 September 1923 E569379
© 1924 New York: Edward B. Marks Music Corp. (Note: Edward B. Marks Music Corporation was founded in 1898 by Edward Bennett Marks (1865–1945). One of Edward's two sons, Herbert Edward Marks (1902–1984), took over the company in 1945. In 1983, Freddy Bienstock bought the Edward B. Marks catalog of classical and contemporary music for $5 million in partnership with the Rodgers and Hammerstein estate. His brother, John, was in charge of the division. The Edward B. Marks catalog is currently owned by Carlin America.)
Billy Wiggins (pseudonym of Billy Higgins) (lyrics)
William Belton Overstreet (music) (1888–1939)
OCLC 499111772

5 additional choruses by Wilson & Ringle (Note: Al. H. Wilson (aka Alphonse or Alfonso H. Wilson; né Alphonse Heerwich Niederhofer; 1868–1936) was an American stage actor, comedian, singer, monologist, songwriter, theater stock company director, and playwright. (Who's Who in Music and Drama. Entry: "Wilson, Al. H.", Dixie Hines né George Wilmer Hines Jr.; 1872–1928, Harry Prescott Hanaford, 1863–1925, eds., H.P. Hanaford, publisher, 1914, pg. 325; OCLC 5345361, 21786350) He was the brother of actress Lizzie Wilson (née Elisabeth Niederhöfer; 1863–1939). (see Winfield Daily Free Press and Passport Applications, referenced below) Alphonse H. Wilson's name is inscribed on a vertical-type monument, 10 feet high, 8 feet wide (front face, right margin, 13th row), honoring the Catholic Actors Guild of America, in Calvary Cemetery Woodside, Queens. Inscribed at the top of the front face is a quote from Macbeth, "A poor player that struts and frets his hour upon the stage, and then is heard no more". Inscribed at the top of the back face is a quote from Hamlet, "Flights of angels sing thee to thy rest". (see Death Certificate and BillionGraves references, below)) (Note: David Townsend Ringle (1894–1965))
© 20 November 1924 E601555; (Note: Vol. 19, Part 2, November–December 1924, Nos. 11–12 (1924), pg. 1299) © Renewal 10 December 1951 R87327 (Wilson & Ringle arrangement)
© 20 November 1924 E601555; © Renewal 20 November 1951 R86297 (Wilson & Ringle arrangement) (Note: Vol. 5, Part 5C, January–June 1951, No. 1 (1952), pg. 159)
OCLC 20410673, 945930898

Arrangements and renewals
© 31 January 1940 EP83470; © Renewal 31 January 1967 R403184 (scored by Jerry Gray; Artie Shaw, arr.) (Note: Vol. 21, Part 5, No. 1, January–June 1967 (1968), pg. 903) OCLC 40478415
© 20 February 1940 EP83170; © Renewal 1 March 1967 R405147 (Roy Eldridge, arr.) (Note: Vol. 21, Part 5, No. 1, January–June 1967 (1968), pg. 903)
© 22 May 1941 EP94890 (Harry Henneman; born 1913; arr.) (Note: Vol. 36, Part 2, July–December 1941, Nos. 5–12 (1941), pg. 1010)
© 14 September 1945 EP134967; © Renewal 26 September 1972 R536531 (Van Alexander, arr.) (Note: Vol. 26, Part 5, No. 2, Sect. I, July–December 1972 (1973), pg. 2621)
© 14 April 1948 EP25222 (Claude G. Garreau, vocal arr., TTBB, published in Time to Harmonize, Vol. 2, pps. 14–15); OCLC 1350092 (Note: Claude Gustave Garreau (born 6 June 1896 Jersey City)) (Note: Vol. 2, Part 5A, No. 1, January–June 1948 (1948), pg. 215)
© 16 September 1921 E519207; © Renewal 20 September 1948 R38135 (Henderson, arr.) (Note: Vol. 2, Part 14B, January–June 1948, No. 1 (1949), pg. 171)
© 16 September 1921 E519207; © Renewal 17 September 1948 R38310 (Henderson, arr.)
© 16 December 1924 E603539; (Note: Vol. 19, Part 2, November–December 1924, Nos. 11–12 (1924), pg. 1299) © Renewal 10 December 1951 R87328 (Wheeler, arr.)
© 17 September 1923 E569379; © 7 January 1954 EP77406 (arrangement by Bud Arburg, EdD, né Harold Walton Arberg Sr. 1918–2009; for four male voices – TTBB) (Note: Vol. 8, Part 5A, No. 1, January–June 1954 (1954), pg. 194)
© 13 August 1929 EP8383 (arr. for orchestra by Ted Lewis); © Renewal 24 August 1956 R175950 (Note: Vol. 10, Part 5C, No. 1, January–June 1954 (1956), pg. 213)
© 1958? (arrangement by Clay Warnick; 1915–1995; for SATB & piano), Plate N° 13861; OCLC 20610949
© 28 April 1965 EP201952 (Charles E. Brooks, arr. for barbershop quartet) (Note: Vol. 19, Part 5, No. 1, Sect. I, January–June 1965 (1967), pg. 627)
© 2012 (transcribed & adapted by Myles Collins; vocal arrangement for big band); Salamander Bay: England Lush Life Music, Plate N° LLM2172; OCLC 867767047

International versions / editions
© 1959; (Swedish text by Tommy, pseudonym of Lennart Reuterskiöld (sv), 1898–1986; for voice & piano with chords); Stockholm: Reuter & Reuter; OCLC 185373906

Catalog of Copyright Entries, Part 3 Musical Compositions, New Series, Library of Congress, Copyright Office

Original and renewal copyrights

Catalog of Copyright Entries, Third Series, Renewal Registrations-Music, Library of Congress, Copyright Office

Copyright renewals and arrangements

== Sheet music covers ==
Edward B. Marks Corporation was the publisher of "There'll Be Some Changes Made." The sheet music cover design, artwork by Irving Politzer (1898–1972), featured portraits of performers who had recorded the song. Those appearing on covers include Marion Harris, Ruth Etting, and Benny Goodman.

=== Subtitle on some sheet music covers ===
Some sheet music covers, even 1st editions, included the subtitle, in parentheses, "Philosophic Blues."
