= Fletcher Allen =

American jazz saxophonist, clarinetist, and composer

- Birth name: Fletcher Allen
- Born: 25 July 1905 La Crosse, Wisconsin, United States
- Died: 5 August 1995 (aged 90) New York
- Genres: Jazz
- Occupation(s): Musician; Composer; Arranger
- Instrument(s): Saxophone; Clarinet
- Years active: 1925-1995

Fletcher Allen (July 25, 1905 – August 5, 1995) was an American jazz saxophonist, clarinetist, and composer.

== Biography ==
Several published sources have incorrectly stated that Allen was born in Cleveland, Ohio. The Social Security index, the United States Veterans index, Allen's draft registration card, and the Wisconsin Births and Christenings Index all confirm that he was born in La Crosse, Wisconsin.

In 1926 he relocated to New York City as a member of the Scott brothers band. Cecil Scott was also a wind instrumentalist and Lloyd Scott was a drummer, and they co-led the band in performances at the Savoy Ballroom. In addition to performing with the group, Allen also recorded with the ensemble in 1927.

In 1927, he travelled to Europe working in a band under the direction of Leon Abbey, a bandleader whose popularity in jazz started off a 1936 tour of India in which Allen also was involved.

In 1938, he started playing with Benny Carter, with both him and Carter playing alto saxophone and clarinet, both had excellent reputations as arrangers.

In late 1938 he travelled to Egypt with the Harlem Rhythmakers, and did not return to the United States until 1940. He served in the United States Army during World War II from January 1943 until August 1945.

In the late 1940s he began playing the baritone saxophone. He continued playing in New York City with a variety of band leaders up into the 1970s; including Fred “Taxi” Mitchell in 1970–1971.

His composition "Viper's Dream" has become a jazz staple.

== Compositions ==
- "Viper's Dream" – recorded by Freddy Taylor (1935), Hot Club de France quintet (1937) and Sebastian Giniaux in 2008.
- "Swingin' in Paris" (1938)
