= Ollie Potter =

American singer

Ollie Potter (1900 – 16 August 1953) was an American female blues singer, notably of Cleveland and New York City, and a dancer, particularly of the shimmy style.

== Career ==
Potter was born in Louisville, Kentucky. She flourished regionally in Cleveland during the prohibition, on into the Great Depression, from the late 1920s, then relocated in Harlem, Manhattan, beginning around 1934, performing through the early 1950s with Art Tatum, Dickie Wells, Willie "the Lion" Smith, Ollie Shepard, and others. She made very few recordings — an extant four — but had been acclaimed by various musicologists and critics for one in particular — a 1941 amateur recording with Art Tatum and other singers at "Gee-Haw Stables," (Note: Gee-Haw Stables, West 132nd Street between 7th & Lenox Avenue, c. 1940-45; an after-after-hours club) in Harlem. That particular recording was not released until 1971. In 1934, Marcus Wright, columnist for the New York Age stated that she was one of Harlem's favorite entertainers. (Note: "The Talk Of The Town", by Marcus Wright, New York Age, December 22, 1934, pg. 5)

Potter performed with Bob Hope

=== Death ===
Potter was admitted to the Sydenham Hospital in June 1953. (Note: "Celeb Sick List," New York Age, June 13, 1953, pg. 6) After a long illness, she died August 16, 1953, in Manhattan. (Note: "New York is My Beat" (re: "Ollie 'Dollar Bill' Potter"), Alan McMillan, New York Age, August 29, 1953, p. 7 (accessible via Newspapers.com at www.newspapers.com/clip/103073785/))

== Selected venues and collaborators ==
- Rainbow Palm Gardens, 427 Indiana Ave, Indianapolis, 1928
- In October 1932, Potter performed at the Plaza Club in Cleveland (Note: The Cleveland Plaza Club was located at 2515 East 61st Street; in 1931, Frank Burns was the manager; the address is the same as that of the Cleveland Home Brewing Company, Black Forest Beer)
- In January 1933, Potter was performing at the Creole Kitchen (aka Creole Club) in Cleveland, (Note: The Creole Kitchen (aka Creole Club), in Cleveland, was, in 1933, managed by Mammy Louise Brooks (née Louise Mae Brooks; 1884–1960); but in 1934, management was taken over by Elmer Waxman (1907–1973) in 1934) acclaimed that year by the Pittsburgh Courier as one of the "Hottest Nite Spots In The Entire Country;" Mammy Louise Brooks (1882–1960) was the manager
- In October 1933, Potter, billed as a torch singer, was performing at the Paramount Inn, in Harlem, owned by Joe Rubin. The club admitted whites only. The floor show included singers Jimmy Hays and Edith King; Johnny Perchey, snakehips dancer; and a female sextet chorus. All shows were produced by Billy Maxey, who also emceed the show. Music was furnished by Sherdena Walker (1904–1982) and Her Orchestra.
- Beginning January 27, 1934. for week at the Lafayette Theatre in Harlem, Potter was a featured stage celebrity in a new musical review staged by Addison Carey (1900–1952); (Note: Addison Carey (likely a pseudonym; 1899–1952) was initially a dancer and bass singer; he became a prominent choreographer and producer of musical reviews, notably at the Harlem Opera House and the Lafayette Theatre in Harlem from the mid-1920s to the late 1940s; He often collaborated with Charles Davis aka C. Columbus Davis (1894–1963), also a choreographer; the Lafayette, owned and operated by Frank Schiffman (1893–1974), was at the time Harlem's flagship vaudeville theatre) other celebrities included Doris Rheubottom (born 1905) (vocalist), the Three Yorkers, (Note: The Three Yorkers were composed of one female and two male singers who also danced) Dewey Brown, George Wiltshire, and George Gee James. (Note: "Lafayette Theatre,", New York Age, January 27, 1934, pg. 6)
- December 1934, Potter was singing at the Poospatuck Club (Note: The Old Poospatuck Club, 773 St. Nicholas Avenue at 149th Street, Harlem, was the original name of St. Nick's Pub in the 1930s. In the 1940s, it was named the Sugar Hill Rendezvous by its new owner Charles Luckeyth Roberts or Luckey Roberts, the great stride pianist whose span on the keys was so wide and so quick, it's been said, because he had the skin between his fingers surgically cut. Later, in the 1950s, the club added opera to its repertoire; the new owners called it the Pink Angel, because, it's been said, it was a popular haunt for homosexual men. And lastly, since the 1960s, it has endured as St. Nick's Pub.) in Sugar Hill, Harlem; a New York Age review lauded her rendition of "Love In Bloom" (Note: "The Talk Of The Town", by Marcus Wright, New York Age, December 8, 1934, pg. 5)
- In December 1935, nationally syndicated columnist Allan W McMillan (1900–1991) wrote "Someone ought to give Ollie Potter (God's gift to the blues) an opportunity on Broadway."
- On February 28, 1935, the second edition of the New Harlem Revels, directed by Rubberlegs Williams, debuted at Dickie Wells Harlem Supper Club. Potter was among the featured artists.
- In June 1936, Potter resigned from Dickie Wells Hot Spot to perform at the Poospatuck Club
- Potter debuted at the Elks Rendezvous in Harlem, 464 Lenox Avenue, (Note: Elk's Rendezvous, 464 Lenox Avenue, c. 1930-45 - held social club dances) in February 1939, in a musical review singing "That's Why I Am In Harlem Every Night," which was well received by the audience. (Note: "New Reyue 'A Sender' At Elks Rendezvous," New York Age, February 18, 1939, pg. 7)
- Willie "The Lion" Smith, featuring Ollie Potter, Suburban Gardens, Washington, D.C. 1939
- Apollo Bar (at 125th Street and 7th Avenue, steps from the Apollo Theater), Harlem, Sunday, May 14, 1950, with Laurel Watson (born around 1913)

== Extant discography ==
- Ollie Shepard, vocalist

Accompanied by Stafford "Pazuza" Simon (tenor sax)
(unknown pianist and drummer)

1. "I'm Stepping Out Tonight"
  Ollie Shepard and Ollie Potter, vocalists
  Matrix: 67084-A
2. "You Got Me Wondering" (©1941)
  Ollie Shepard (w&m)
  Ollie Potter, vocalist

Matrix: 67085-A
Recorded January 22, 1940, New York
Decca De 7805

- Art Tatum, Onyx ORI205

Art Tatum (piano, vocalist on track 1) Chocolate Williams (bass) Anna Robinson (vocalist 2) Ethel White (vocalist 4) Charlie Shavers (vocalist 5) Ollie Potter (vocalist 6)
Recorded live "Gee-Haw Stables," New York, July 26 or 27, 1941

1. "Toledo Blues" (1)
2. "Body and Soul" (cw out), Heyman, Sour, Eyton (words); Green (music)
3. "Stardust" (3), Carmichael (music), Parish (words)
4. "Embraceable You" (4), George Gershwin (music), Ira Gershwin (words)
5. "I Surrender Dear" (5), Gordon Clifford & Harry Barris (music)
6. "There'll Be Some Changes Made" (6), William Blackstone (words) & Benton Overstreet (music) audio
- Ollie Potter
1. Side A: Ollie Potter and Her After Hours Orchestra
  "Too Much E-E-L," by Gerald "Corky" Williams (1896–1950)
  Matrix: H-110
2. : Side B: Ollie Potter and Her Buck Eye Boys
  "Big Fat Dollar Bill"
  Ollie Potter & Emmett Wallace (1909–2006) (w&m)
  Matrix: H-108
  Harlem Records 1020 (1945 or 1946)

Note: Harlem Records was one of several labels founded by J. Mayo Williams; his other labels were Ebony Records, Chicago Record Company, Southern Record Company

== Published works ==
- "That Fat Dollar Bill"

Ollie Potter & Emmett Babe Wallace (1909–2006) (words & music)
(1946)

== Marriages ==
On November 3, 1931, Variety magazine published that Potter was going to marry Herman Ferdinand (1905–1989) in December 1931. Potter was, at the time, performing at the Plaza Club in Cleveland and Ferdinand (born February 1, 1881, Russia) was a Cleveland club manager.

== Notes and references ==
=== General references ===
- 1936
- Willie the Lion Smith
