= Chocolate Williams =

- Also known as: Bob Williams; Billy Williams
- Born: Robert Williams Jr. February 1, 1916; Augusta, Georgia, U.S.
- Died: June 22, 1984 (aged 68) Manhattan, New York, U.S.
- Occupations: Jazz bassist, vocalist
- Instrument: Double bass
- Years active: 1935–1957
- Label: Onyx Records
- Formerly of: Three Chocolates

Chocolate Williams (also known as Billy and Bob, né Robert Williams Jr.; February 1, 1916 – June 22, 1984) was an American jazz bassist and vocalist based in New York City. He was a prolific performer of jazz, and, notably, performed and recorded with Art Tatum in 1941 and Herbie Nichols in 1952.

== Selected career highlights ==
Williams performed with the Cotton Club Tramp Band, Rex Stewart Combo, Herbie Nichols, Art Tatum, his own trio, the Three Chocolates, and his own jazz combo, Chocolate Williams and His Chocolateers. Williams was the founding leader of The Three Chocolates. (Note: Members of the Three Chocolates were: 1. Chocolate Williams (died 1984) (bass and leader); 2. Jerome Darr (de) (1910 Baltimore – October 19, 1986 Brooklyn) (guitar) ("Guitarist Jerome Darr, 75, Dies After Brief Illness", Amsterdam News, November 8, 1986, p. 24); 3. William "Willie" or "Bill" Spottswood (piano); Venues included The Plantation Club, which in the 1930s, was at 80 West 126th Street, in Harlem) The other two original members were guitarist Jerome Darr (de), who went on to perform with Jonah Jones, and pianist Bill Spotswood. (Note: William Spotswood (aka Willie or Williah Spottswood, aka Spotwood, né William Howard Spottswood Jr.; born around 1916 New York City), from about 1926 to about 1930, studied piano at the Martin-Smith School of Music in New York City; he was a co-composer – with Leonard Ware, and Edward Robinson – originally uncredited, of "Hold Tight;" they composed while performing it as a trio) Throughout the 1940s and mid-fifties, The Three Chocolates played at clubs along the Eastern Seaboard and the Midwest and were favorites in many swank Harlem after-hour spots. In late 1943, The Three Chocolates performed at the Onyx Club on 52nd Street for seven months, the Famous Door for five months, and, before that, Kelly's Stables. Bassist Earl May (de) (1926–2008), who substituted for Williams at Minton's, succeeded him when he stopped playing there.

Semi-retirement

After his semi-retirement in 1955, Chocolate Williams worked as a messenger for CBS and retired in 1974.

Residences

He was born in Augusta, Georgia in 1916, and lived there until at least 1930. Williams lived at 60 West 142nd Street in the Sugar Hill area of Harlem when he died in 1984.

== Selected extant discography ==
1. 1940s
2. Art Tatum
  Onyx ORI205
  Art Tatum (piano, vocalist on tr 1), Chocolate Williams (bass on trs 2, 3, 5–8, vocalist on tr 2), Anna Robinson (vocalist on tr 5), Ethel White (vocalist on tr 6), Charlie Shavers (vocalist on tr 6), Ollie Potter (vocalist on tr 8)
  Recorded live July 26 or 27, 1941, at Gee-Haw Stables, New York City
  1: "Mighty Lak' a Rose"
  Art Tatum (vocalist)
  (Williams not on this cut)
  2: "Knockin' Myself Out"
  Chocolate Williams (vocalist)
  3: "Toledo Blues" (1)
  Art Tatum (vocalist)
  4: "Body and Soul"
  (Williams not on this cut)
  Johnny Green (music)
  Edward Heyman (words)
  Robert Sour (words)
  Frank Eyton (words)
  5: "Star Dust"
  Anna Robinson (vocalist)
  Hoagy Carmichael (music)
  Mitchell Parish (words)
  6: "Embraceable You"
  Ethel White (vocalist)
  George Gershwin (music)
  Ira Gershwin (words)
  7: "I Surrender Dear"
  Charlie Shavers (vocalist)
  Harry Barris (music)
  Gordon Clifford (words)
  8: "There'll Be Some Changes Made" (6)
  Ollie Potter (vocalist)
  William (Willie) Benton Overstreet (1888–1935) (music)
  Billy Higgins (né William Weldon Higgins; 1888–1937) (words)
  (see note)
3. Chocolate Williams With Brick Fleagle's Rhythmakers
  Hot Record Society Records Records (HRS 1036) (1947)
  Recorded May 5, 1947, New York City
  Billy Taylor (piano), "Half Valve" (coronet), Brick Fleagle (guitar), Chocolate Williams (bass), Jimmy Crawford (drums)
  1065-1: "They'll Do It Every Time"
  Ralph Douglas, Frankie Carle (w&m) (1952)
  1065-4: "On You It Looks Good"
  Ralph Douglas (w&m)
4. Chocolate Williams and His Chocolateers
  Recorded March 6, 1952, New York City
  Herbie Nichols (piano), Danny Barker (guitar), Chocolate Williams (bass, vocals), Shadow Wilson (drums)
  Hi-Lo Records 1402 (1952)
  HL 311: "Lady Gingersnap" ("Lady Ginger Snaps")
  Chocolate Williams (vocalist)
  Ernie Washington (né Ernest Franklin Washington; 1926–1979) (w&m)
  Paul Bascomb (w&m)
  HL 312: "Good Story Blues"
  Chocolate Williams (vocalist)
  (audio on YouTube)
  Robert Williams Jr. (w&m)
  Jerome Darr (de) (1910–1986) (w&m)
5. Herbie Nichols
  Savoy MG 12100 (1952)
  HL 313: "Who's Blues?"
  HL 314: "'S Wonderful"
  Gershwin (w&m)
  HL 315: "Nichols and Dimes"
6. Thelonious Monk with the Gigi Gryce Quartet / Herbie Nichols
  Savoy SJL 1166
  HL 314: "'S Wonderful" (alternate take)
  Gershwin (w&m)
  HL 315: "Nichols and Dimes" (alternate take)
7. Chocolate Williams and His Chocolateers
  Hi-Lo Records 1403 (1952)
  HL 313: "Who's Blues?"
  Nathaniel Pierce Blish Jr. (1901–1992) (w&m)
  HL 314: "'S Wonderful"
  Gershwin (w&m)
8. Other sessions
9. Joe Williams
  Cincinnati Records 2300 (1944)
  Recorded in Cincinnati, ca. November 1944
  2300 A: (matrix QB3345): "'Round The Clock Blues" (part 1)
  2300 B: (matrix QB3345): "'Round The Clock Blues" (part 2)
  Joe Williams & J. Mayo Williams (words & music; 1944)
  Chicago: Mayo Music Corp. (publisher)
  OCLC 811765032, 811765032

Discography notes

- "Knockin' Myself Out", with Tatum on piano and Williams singing, refers to reefer and its local supplier:

If you want to get high, get high kind of quick,
Just fall on up to the Gee-Haw
And pick up on old Frank Martin's sticks

- "There'll Be Some Changes Made", was recorded in 1941 on acetate discs by an amateur, a Columbia Student, Jerry Newman (né Jerome Robert Newman; 1918–1970), and released in the 1973. Newman's collection was the initial sole material used to launch the jazz label, Onyx Recording, Inc. (aka Onyx Records), a New York entity co-founded in 1972 by Don Schlitten and Joe Fields.

Newman, (Note: Bill Fox (aka Bill Mink, Bill Wolf/Wolfe), Jerry Newman, and Seymour Weiss (né Seymour Michael Wyse; born 1923 in London) founded the Esoteric Record Corporation in 1949 in New York. In 1957 the label was renamed Counterpoint; and after being first sold to Eichler Records Corporation in 1960, and then to Everest Record Group in 1963, to Counterpoint / Esoteric Records. Earlier, in 1948, Newman and Wyse founded Greenwich Music Shop. In 1964, Fox moved to Vanguard Records, to become the production coordinator. Fox had been Newman's business partner with the Greenwich Music Shop) while a student at Columbia in 1941, lugged his acetate disc recording machine – a portable Wilcox-Gay Recordio "disc cutter" – to jazz clubs in Harlem, including Minton's Playhouse on 118th Street and Clark Monroe's Uptown House on 134th Street, both of which were incubators of jazz of the day, and in 1941, the beginning of bebop. Newman's collection has endured as the core library for Onyx Recording, Inc. Art Tatum at Minton's in 1941, issued by Onyx after being declined by Columbia, on the LP God Is in the House. (Note: God is in the house, Art Tatum, Onyx Records, ORI 205 (LP) (1972); OCLC 3197822, 473711960 Art Tatum (1909–1956) (piano), Frankie Newton (1906–1954) (trumpet), Chocolate Williams (bass); Ebenezer Paul (1919–1947) (bass) Liner notes: Dan Morgenstern 1940: November 11 1941: May 7, July 26–27, September 16 Minton's, Harlem Re-issued: HighNote HCD 7030 (CD) (1998); OCLC 41634272) At the 16th Annual Grammy Awards held in March 1974, the album won two Grammys, one for Best Improvised Jazz Solo and one for Best Liner Notes, written by Morgenstern. Newman's recordings have been issued as unauthorized records, variously over the years, but none were done so with the permission or participation of the artists or their estates. The commercial value of the recordings were deemed nil; and those who acquired and distributed the recordings viewed the mission as one of curating jazz history.

The Art Tatum session at Gee-Haw Stables was the subject of a poem, "Art Tatum at the Gee-Haw Stables", by Grace Schulman.

== Selected lyrics ==
"Good Story Blues"

(twelve-bar blues)
(audio on YouTube)

(1st Verse)
Don't want no woman
That uses a straight comb
Don't want no woman
That uses a straight comb
She's ornery and evil
Can't keep a happy home

(2st Verse)
Looks in the mirror
Get mad when she sees her hair
Looks in the mirror
Get mad when she sees her hair
Can't blame her
'Cause its hardly any up there

(3rd Verse)
Ain't my fault
If she has bad hair
Ain't my fault
If she has bad hair
She may as well accept the fact
'Cause gettin' evil ain't nowhere

Piano solo
(12 bars)

(4th Verse)
Woman quit your squawkin'
Don't be so dumb
Woman quit your squawkin'
Don't be so dumb
If you don't like the hair you got
Go downtown and buy you some

== Collaborators ==
- Percy Brice (né Percy Austin Brice Jr.; born March 25, 1923, New York City) (de), drummer, performed with Chocolate Williams after-hours at Minton's from 1953 to 1954.

== Family ==
Among his survivors are: his son, Tony Davis; a sister, Alberta Bloomer, a niece, Jennifer Riley; a nephew and 15 grandnieces and nephews.

Parents

- Mother: Jennie (née Jennifer Scott), who was married to Robert Williams Sr., and, later, Edward Bolden
- Father: Robert Williams Sr.

Nephew
Kimati Dinizulu (1956–2013) – the late American-born African percussionist and exponent of Akan traditions in America – was a nephew of Chocolate Williams.

== Selected compositions ==
- "Three Nickels and a Dime", Chocolate Williams (w&m), 1st copy December 16, 1944, Class E unpublished 401371, Chicago: Mayo Music Corp (Note: Vol. 40, No. 1, (1945), p. 98)

== "Three Chocolates" disambiguation ==
The Three Chocolates might wrongly associated with:

- Three Chocolate Dandies, vocalists and dancers from the mid-1920s, which featured Albert Wilkins, Bennie Anderson, Fulton Alexander
- The Chocolate Dandies (1924), a musical comedy review; the book was by Noble Sissle and Lew Peyton and the music was by Noble Sissle and Eubie Blake
- Chocolate Kiddies (1925), an international touring musical revue directed by Sam Wooding
- The Chocolate Steppers, dancers from the early-1930s
- The Three Chocolate Drops, dancers from the early-1930s
- Three Chocolateers, acrobatic danceers and vocalists, who, among other things, performed "Peckin'" in the 1937 film, New Faces of 1937; originally from the West Coast, but performed famously in Harlem, notably at the Apollo Theater and Cotton Club; possible original members: Al Bert "Gip" Gipson, Paul Black, known for his Chinese splits (straddling the floor as he walked), and Eddie West, with James Buster Brown replacing West for a short period of time
- Kid Chocolate, World Featherweight Champion boxer from Cuba
- The Chocolateers (aka the Burbank Chocolateers), appeared on WBZ (Boston) as early as May 1926
- The Chocolateers, a baseball team sponsored by Hershey Chocolate of Hershey, Pennsylvania, from as early as 1929
- Garrott Chocolateers, a radio orchestra out of Pittsburgh (1929–1930), formerly Garrott's Chocolate Soldiers (musical comedy; on radio from 1926 to 1927)
- Nestle Chocolateers, singers sponsored by the company, initially broadcast from Pittsburgh beginning September 5, 1930, running through 1934, and hosted by Helen Morgan
- Phil Kelly's Chocolateers, A basketball team from Kingston, New York, in the early 1930s
- George Dawson's Chocolateers, guitarist Dawson formed this Detroit group in 1935 as the house band at the Chocolate Bar in Detroit; They made a few recordings for Paradise Records in late 1947
- The Carolina Chocolate Drops
- Jason "White Chocolate" Williams, NBA basketball player
- Curtis "Chocolate" Williams of Pittsburgh
- Connie's Hot Chocolates, a 1929 Broadway musical
