= Onyx Records =

Independent American jazz record label (1971-1978)

- Founded: July 15, 1971
- Founder: Joe Fields and Don Schlitten
- Defunct: 1978
- Status: Defunct
- Genre: Jazz, blues
- Country of origin: U.S.
- Location: New York City

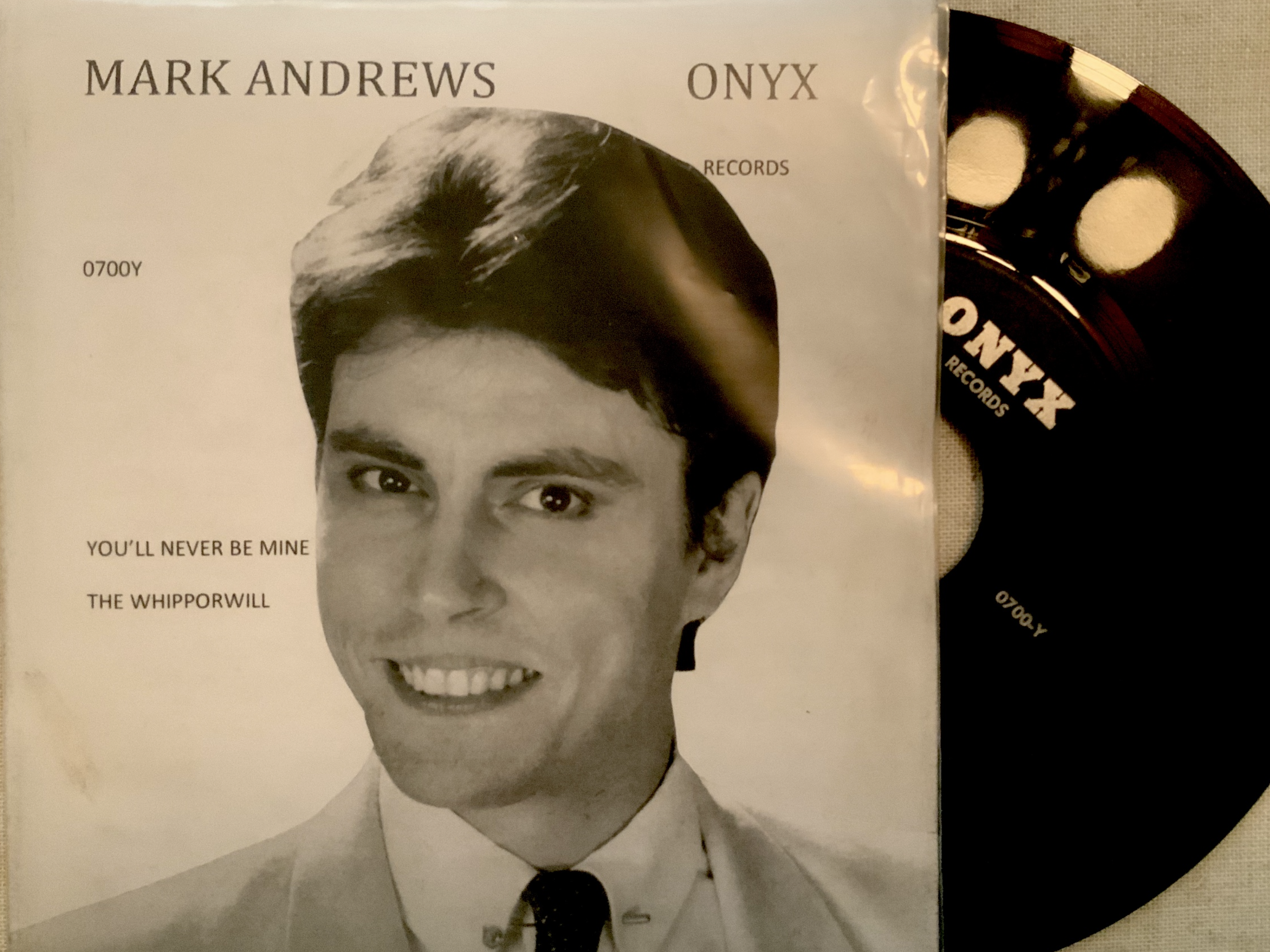
ONYX RECORDS 1972

Onyx Records, Inc., was a small, independent American record label based in Manhattan, New York, co-founded on July 15, 1971, by Joe Fields (1929–2017) and Don Schlitten (born 1932) and managed by Gentry McCreary (born 1941). Its address was at 160 West 71st Street on the Upper West Side.

== History ==
Onyx flourished from its founding through 1978, re-issuing recordings, including those of Art Tatum, Hot Lips Page, Don Byas, and Charlie Parker. Its initial releases were selections from the Jerry Newman Collection (né Jerome Robert Newman; 1918–1970), who, in 1941, recorded live performances at clubs in Harlem while a student at Columbia University. The name "Onyx" was the namesake of four jazz clubs – all named the Onyx Club – all, at different times, on West 52nd Street in Manhattan, but notably, the club that ran from 1942 to 1949 at the vanguard of bebop. Onyx Records received acclaim from Dan Morgenstern for its release of radio broadcast transcriptions from KFBI Wichita featuring the Jay McShann Band with Charlie Parker.

=== Corporate background ===
Onyx Records was founded as a New York corporation on July 15, 1971, under the name of Avatar Productions, Inc. The name was changed to Onyx Records, Inc., in 1973. Onyx was owned equally by Joe Fields and Don Schlitten. Onyx was in the business of securing rights in "classic" jazz master recordings and manufacturing and distributing phono records derived from such master recordings.

== Selected discography ==
=== Newman's collection ===
Newman, (Note: Bill Fox (aka Bill Mink, Bill Wolf/Wolfe), Jerry Newman, and Seymour Weiss (né Seymour Michael Wyse; born 1923 in London) founded the Esoteric Record Corporation in 1949 in New York. In 1957 the label was renamed Counterpoint; and after being first sold to Eichler Records Corporation in 1960, and then to Everest Record Group in 1963, to Counterpoint / Esoteric Records. Earlier, in 1948, Newman and Wyse founded Greenwich Music Shop. In 1964, Fox moved to Vanguard Records, to become the production coordinator. Fox had been Newman's business partner with the Greenwich Music Shop) while a student at Columbia in 1941, lugged his acetate disc recording machine — a portable Wilcox-Gay Recordio "disc cutter" — to jazz clubs in Harlem, including Minton's Playhouse on 118th Street and Clark Monroe’s Uptown House on 134th Street, both of which were incubators of jazz of the day. Newman's collection became the backbone for Onyx Recording, Inc.

- Art Tatum at Minton's in 1941, issued by Onyx after being declined by Columbia, on the LP God Is In The House. (Note: God is in the House, Art Tatum, Onyx Records, ORI 205 (LP) (1972); OCLC 3197822, 473711960 Art Tatum (1909–1956) (piano), Frankie Newton (1906–1954) (trumpet), Chocolate Williams (bass); Ebenezer Paul (1919–1947) (bass) Liner notes: Dan Morgenstern 1940: November 11 1941: May 7, July 26–27, September 16 Minton's, Harlem Re-issued: HighNote HCD 7030 (CD) (1998); OCLC 41634272) At the 16th Annual Grammy Awards held in March 1974, the album won two Grammys, one for Best Improvised Jazz Solo and one for Best Liner Notes, written by Morgenstern
- Newman's recordings have been issued as unauthorized records, variously over the years, but none were done so with the permission or participation of the artists or their estates. The commercial value of the recordings were nil; and those who acquired them viewed the market as one of historic preservation.

=== Re-release of broadcast transcriptions of KFBI radio, Wichita ===
The Jay McShann Band recorded two sessions – one on November 30, 1940, and one on December 2, 1940 — at the studio of KFBI radio, Wichita, for broadcast transcriptions. The band members were:

Charlie Parker (1920–1955) (alto sax),
Buddy Anderson (1919–1997) (trumpet)
Orville "Piggy" Minor (1917–1999) (trumpet)
Bud Gould (né James Frederick Gould; 1917–2002) (trombone, violin)
William James Scott ("Scotty", grew-up in Kansas City) (tenor sax) †
Jay McShann (1916–2006) (piano)
Gene Ramey (1913–1984) (bass)
Gus Johnson (1913–2000) (drums)
Onyx ORI 221

† Replaced for the second sessions by Bob Mabane (né Robert Lee Mcbane, Jr.; 1914–1991) (tenor sax)

=== Charlie Parker ===
A compilation album, Charlie Parker – First Recordings! (ORI 221), which included the KFBI sessions of November 30, 1940, and December 2, 1940, plus an AFRS #582 broadcast from the Savoy Ballroom on February 12, 1945 – released in 1974 – won a Grammy Award for Best Performance by a Soloist in 1975. The 1945 session featured Cootie Williams and his Orchestra:

Cootie Williams, Harold "Money" Johnson, Ermit V. Perry, George Treadwell (trumpets); Ed Burke, Bob Horton (trombones); Charlie Parker, Frank Powell (alto saxes); Lee Pope, Sam "The Man" Taylor (tenor saxes); Eddie de Verteuil (bari sax); Arnold Jarvis (piano); Leroy Kirkland (guitar); Carl Pruitt (double bass); Sylvester "Vess" Payne (drum kit); Tony Warren (vocalist)

== Onyx principals ==
- Don Schlitten, president, was an RCA producer who, at the time, had been producing RCA Vintage Series
- Gentry McCreary, general manager
- Fields was also the sole shareholder of Blanchris, Inc., the parent company of Muse Records (co-founded by both Fields and Schlitten). Muse was primarily in the business of recording and distributing contemporary jazz records.

== Selected artists ==
- Louis Armstrong
- Dave Bailey
- Louis Bellson
- Sonny Berman
- Don Byas
- Sid Catlett
- Charlie Christian
- Kenny Clarke
- Buck Clayton
- Teddy Edwards
- Roy Eldridge
- Duke Ellington
- Tommy Flanagan
- Slim Gaillard
- Vivien Garry
- Dexter Gordon
- Wardell Gray
- Bobby Hackett
- Edmond Hall
- Clyde Hart
- Coleman Hawkins
- J.C. Heard
- Johnny Hodges
- Russell Jacquet
- Nat Jaffe
- Barney Kessel
- Dodo Marmarosa
- Jay McShann
- Mills Blue Rhythm Band
- Theloneous Monk
- Clark Monroe
- Hot Lips Page
- Charlie Parker
- Leo Parker
- Flip Phillips
- Art Pepper
- Don Redman
- Red Rodney
- Jimmy Rushing
- Tony Scott
- Charlie Shavers
- Slam Stewart
- Maxine Sullivan
- Art Tatum
- Joe Thomas
- Dave Tough
- Ben Webster
- Cootie Williams
- Mary Lou Williams
- Lester Young

== See also ==
- Muse Records had no label or business connection with Onyx, but, nonetheless, was co-founded by the same people.
- Xanadu Records was a label founded by Don Schlitten
- HighNote Records has re-issued some recordings from Onyx's catalog
- Legal case
- Onyx Club in dictionary
- "Ars Gratia Tatum: A Brief Biographical Sketch Of Art Tatum, The Greatest Pianist In Jazz," by Ron Davis, Toronto (1978; 2009)

== Other labels with a similar name ==
- Onyx Records, an American rockabilly label from the late 1950s, owned by Jerry Winston. The label was known for having recorded The Velours.
- Onyx International Records, a gospel label
