= Henry Wells (musician) =

American jazz musician

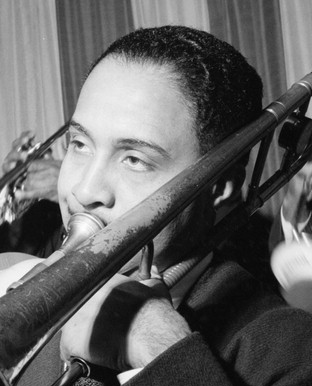
Henry Wells at Eddie Condon's of New York City in January 1947

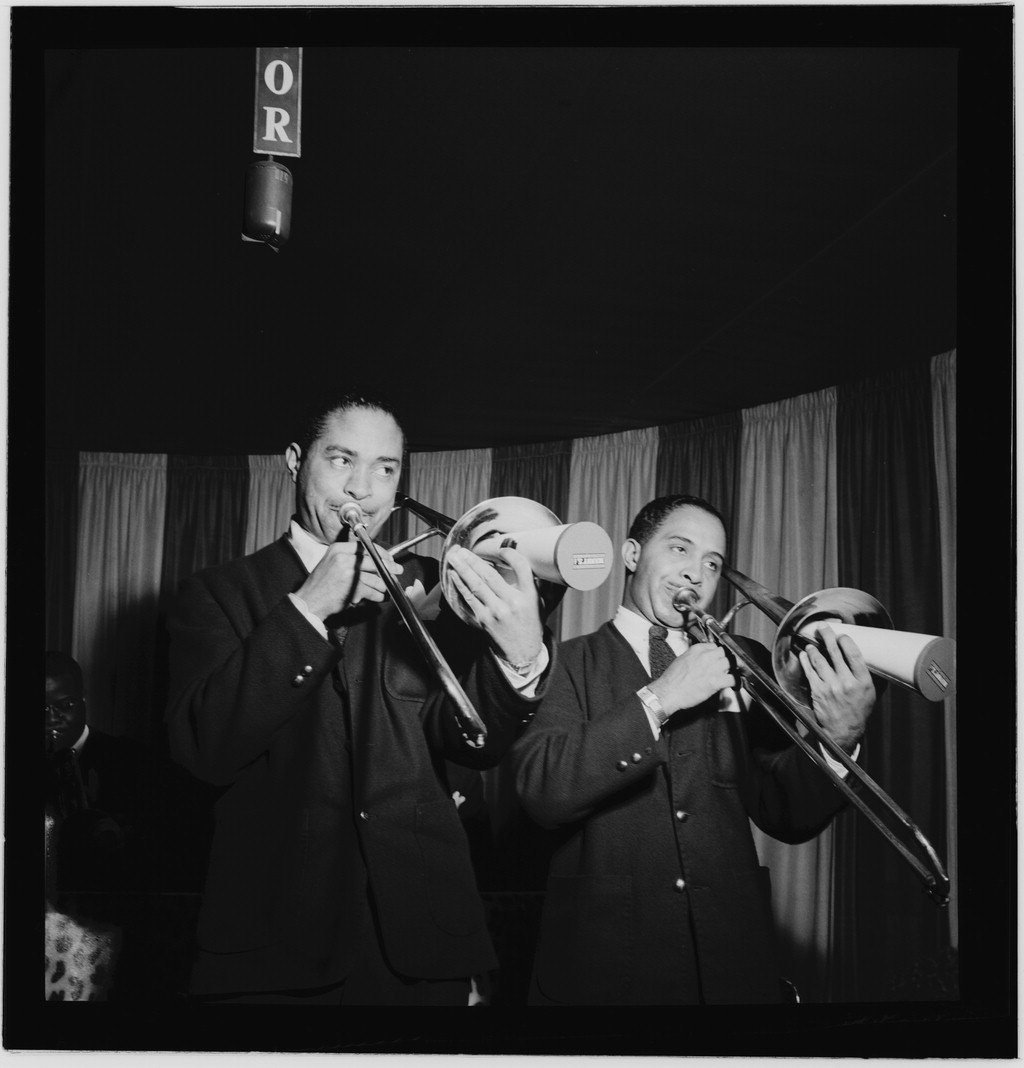
Henry Wells (right) and Dicky Wells at Eddie Condon's. Photo by William P. Gottlieb. Note WOR microphone above.

Henry James Wells (born 1906, in Dallas) was an American jazz trombonist, vocalist, and bandleader. He was the brother of Dicky Wells.

Wells studied at Fisk University and the Cincinnati Conservatory, and worked professionally starting in the late 1920s. He joined Jimmie Lunceford's band in 1929 and remained with him until 1935; during this time, he also played with Cab Calloway and Claude Hopkins. From 1936 to 1941 he worked intermittently with Andy Kirk, and played with him again in 1946; he left Kirk's employ temporarily to put together his own band and to complete a stint in the U.S. Army. During his time with Kirk, he was often employed as a vocalist, including on recordings. He also played with Gene Krupa and Teddy Hill in the early 1940s. After World War II he worked with Rex Stewart and Sy Oliver; he was active as a performer on the West Coast into the 1960s.
