= Soma Morgenstern =

Jewish-Ukrainian writer and journalist (1890–1976)

- Born: 3 May 1890
- Died: 17 April 1976 (aged 85)
- Occupation: writer
- Years active: 1908-1976

Soma Morgenstern (3 May 1890 – 17 April 1976) was a Jewish-Ukrainian writer and journalist.

== Biography ==
Soma (real name Salomo) Morgenstern spent his childhood in various villages in Galicia. His father worked as a bailiff, but was also a Jewish scholar and fulfilled the functions of a prayer leader in the area where the Morgensterns lived at that time. The Morgenstern family were adherents of Hasidic Judaism, and so religion played a significant role in Soma's childhood.

Morgenstern's upbringing was not only religious but also multilingual. In his childhood memories Ukrainian was his first language, though Yiddish became his native tongue. He also learned ancient Hebrew in order to understand religious texts, and sometimes went to Polish, sometimes Ukrainian village schools, in which he was also taught German. German would later be the language in which he wrote, in large part because his father held the language in high esteem.

He did not however take after his father in all things; after he completed his basic education he went to the grammar school in Tarnopol, a regional cultural centre at the time. During this period he became an atheist, but later rediscovered his religion, which strongly influenced his work:

"But I stood before a lectern, on which a neglected prayer-book lay. [...] My eyes fell onto a verse which I knew well, but only now recognised as a great truth. [...] He that planted the ear, shall he not hear? He that formed the eye, shall he not see? [Psalm 94.9, KJV] What a verse! What a question! I had learned from the Darwinists how an organ for seeing can come into existence. [...] But, as I suddenly asked myself, who invented seeing? Who had put it into words as the psalmist did?! Who had questioned so deeply and written so highly?! I felt my atheism faltering." (From In another time. Youth in East Galicia, his incomplete autobiography)

After he left grammar school, Morgenstern left for Vienna to study law in 1912, where his studies were interrupted by his military service during the First World War, meaning he only graduated in 1921. Afterwards he worked as, among others, as the Vienna correspondent for the Frankfurter Zeitung and moved in the intellectual circles of Vienna, and was befriended by, for example, the composer Alban Berg and the authors Joseph Roth and Robert Musil.

In March 1938, at the time of the Anschluss, he fled Vienna via France (where he was repeatedly detained as a "foreign enemy") to New York in 1941, where he lived until his death in 1976. His son Dan Morgenstern was a jazz writer and a director of the Institute of Jazz Studies at Rutgers University.

== Bibliography ==
- The Son of the Lost Son (Philadelphia: The Jewish Publication Society of America, 1946)
- In My Father's Pastures (Philadelphia: The Jewish Publication Society of America, 1947)
- The Testament of the Lost Son (Philadelphia: The Jewish Publication Society of America, 1950)

The following eleven works appear on Soma Morgenstern's entry at ZuKlampen-Verlags (German):

- The Funken im Abgrund (Eng: Sparks in the abyss) trilogy of novels:
  - Volume I. Der Sohn des verlorenen Sohnes (The son of the lost son) Springe, 1996. ISBN 3-924245-38-X
  - Band II. Idyll im Exil (Idyll in exile) Springe, 1996. ISBN 3-924245-39-8
  - Band III. Das Vermächtnis des verlorenen Sohnes (The legacy of the lost son) Springe, 1996. ISBN 3-924245-40-1
- Flucht in Frankreich (Flight into France), a novel-reportage. Springe, 1998. ISBN 3-924245-42-8
- Der Tod ist ein Flop (Death is a flop), novel. Springe, 1999. ISBN 3-924245-43-6
- Die Blutsäule. Zeichen und Wunder am Sereth (The pillar of blood. Omens and miracles at Sereth), novel. Springe, 1997. ISBN 3-924245-41-X
- Joseph Roths Flucht und Ende (Joseph Roth's flight and end), memoirs. Springe, 1994. ISBN 3-924245-35-5
- Alban Berg und seine Idole (Alban Berg and his idols), memoirs and letters. Springe, 1995. ISBN 3-924245-36-3
- In einer anderen Zeit. Jugendjahre in Ostgalizien (In another time. Youth in East Galicia), Springe, 1995. ISBN 3-924245-37-1
- Dramen. Feuilletons. Fragmente (Dramas. News. Fragments) Springe, 2000. ISBN 3-924245-44-4
- Kritiken. Berichte. Tagebücher (Reviews. Reports. Diaries) Springe, 2001. ISBN 3-924245-45-2

== Awards ==
- 1951: National Jewish Book Award for The Testament of the Lost Son
