= Teddy Hill =

American jazz musican, bandleader, and club owner (1909–1978)

- Hill in 1947; by William P. Gottlieb

Background information
- Born: Theodore Hill; December 7, 1909; Birmingham, Alabama, U.S.
- Died: May 19, 1978 (aged 68) Cleveland, Ohio, U.S.
- Occupations: Musician; bandleader; club manager
- Instruments: Drums; clarinet; soprano saxophone; tenor saxophone
- Years active: 1920s–1970s
- Labels: ARC; Banner; Conqueror; Melotone; Oriole; Perfect; Romeo; Vocalion; Bluebird
- Spouse: Louise Welton (1920s–1930s)
- Partner: Bonnie Davis
- Known for: Managing Minton's Playhouse
- Children: Melba Moore

Theodore Hill (December 7, 1909 in Birmingham, Alabama – May 19, 1978 in Cleveland, Ohio) was an American jazz bandleader and the manager of Minton's Playhouse, a seminal jazz club in Harlem. He played a variety of instruments, including the drums, clarinet, and soprano and tenor saxophones.

== Life and career ==
After moving to New York City, Hill had early gigs with the Whitman Sisters, George Howe, and Luis Russell's orchestra in the 1920s, later forming his own band in 1934, which found steady work over the NBC Radio Network. Over several years, it featured such major young musicians as Roy Eldridge, Bill Coleman, Frankie Newton, and Dizzy Gillespie. Hill's band played at the Savoy Ballroom regularly and, in the summer of 1937, toured England and France. After leaving the band business, Hill began to manage Minton's Playhouse in 1940, which became a hub for the bebop style, featuring Thelonious Monk and Kenny Clarke, among others. Hill left Minton's in 1969, long after its musical significance had declined; he then became the manager of Baron's Lounge.

== Recording career ==
In 1935, Hill recorded a four-song session for ARC (and the subsidiaries Banner, Conqueror, Melotone, Oriole, Perfect, Romeo). In 1936, he recorded two sessions (four songs) for Vocalion Records. He signed with Bluebird Records in 1937 and recorded 18 songs over three sessions.

== Personal life ==
Hill married Louise Welton in the 1920s. Their daughter, Gwendolyn Louise Hill, was born in 1930. Teddy and Louise eventually separated and divorced.

In the late 1930s, a singer named Bonnie Davis began working in his band. They later had a daughter together, Beatrice Hill, who would become known under the stage name Melba Moore.

== Discography ==
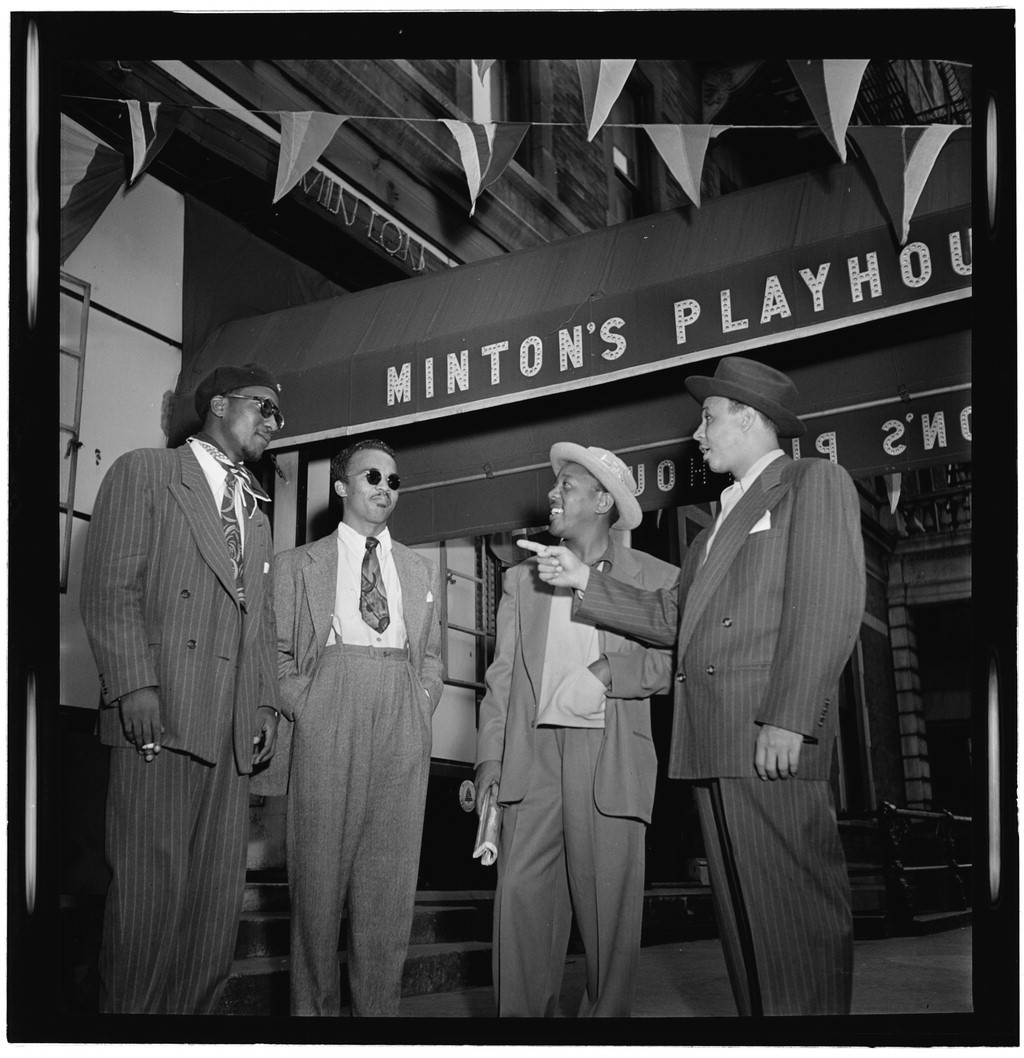
From left: Thelonious Monk, Howard McGhee, Roy Eldridge, and Hill, outside Minton's Playhouse, New York City, 1947; by William P. Gottlieb

1935: Teddy Hill and His Orchestra (Bill Coleman, Roy Eldridge, Bill Dillard, Dicky Wells, Russell Procope, Howard E. Johnson, Chu Berry, Sam Allen, John Smith, Richard Fullbright, Bill Beason):

- "(Lookie, Lookie, Lookie) Here Comes Cookie"
- "Got Me Doin' Things"
- "When the Robin Sings His Song Again"
- "When Love Knocks at Your Heart"

1936: Teddy Hill and His Orchestra (Shad Collins, Bill Dillard, Frank Newton, Dicky Wells, Russell Procope, Howard Johnson, Kenneth Hollon [later replaced by Cecil Scott], Sam Allen, John Smith, Richard Fullbright, Bill Beason):

- "Uptown Rhapsody"
- "Christopher Columbus"
- "Passionette"
- "At the Rug Cutters' Ball"

1937: Teddy Hill and His NBC Orchestra (Shad Collins, Frank Newton, Bill Dillard, Dicky Wells, Russell Procope, Cecil Scott, Howard Johnson, Sam Allen, John Smith, Richard Fullbright, Bill Beason, Beatrice Douglas):

- "The Love Bug Will Bite You"
- "Would You Like to Buy a Dream"
- "Big Boy Blue"
- "Where Is the Sun"
- "The Harlem Twister (The New Sensation)"
- "My Marie"
- "I Know Now"
- "The Lady Who Couldn't Be Kissed"
- "(Have You Forgotten) The You and Me that Used to Be"
- "A Study in Brown"
- "Twilight in Turkey"
- "China Boy"

1937: Teddy Hill and His Orchestra (Shad Collins, Dizzy Gillespie, Bill Dillard, Dicky Wells, Russell Procope, Howard Johnson, Robert Carroll, Sam Allen, John Smith, Richard Fullbright, Bill Beason):

- "San Anton'"
- "I'm Happy, Darling, Dancing with You"
- "Yours and Mine"
- "I'm Feeling Like a Million"
- "King Porter Stomp"
- "Blue Rhythm Fantasy" (Included in The Complete RCA Victor Recordings, among others)
