= Beason =

Beason may refer to:

- Beason (surname)
- Beason, Illinois
