= God Is in the House (Art Tatum album) =

Live album by Art Tatum
- Released: 1973
- Recorded: November 11, 1940, March 7, July 26–27, September 16, 1941
- Venue: Clubs in Harlem, New York City
- Genre: Jazz
- Label: Onyx
- Producer: Jerry Newman, Don Schlitten

God Is in the House is an album by pianist Art Tatum. It is a collection of informally recorded club performances from 1940 and 1941, and was first released by Onyx Records in 1973. It won two Grammy Awards.

== Recording and music ==
Jerry Newman was a student and jazz fan in New York City. He used a disc recorder and acetate discs to informally record pianist Art Tatum playing in clubs in Harlem in 1940 and 1941.

Three of the performances are Tatum playing solo on November 11, 1940. On March 7, 1941, he was recorded with Reuben Harris hitting whiskbrooms against a suitcase. On July 26 of the same year, further duets, this time with Chocolate Williams on bass and vocals, were recorded; Tatum also sang on two of the pieces – "Knockin' Myself Out" and "Toledo Blues". "There'll Be Some Changes Made", with Williams and vocalist Ollie Potter, was made the following day. The trio of Tatum, trumpeter Frankie Newton, and bassist Ebenezer Paul was recorded playing "Lady Be Good" and "Sweet Georgia Brown" on September 16.

== Release and reception ==
The title of the album comes from a story involving Tatum and fellow pianist Fats Waller. When Waller was playing in a club one night and saw Tatum walk in, he announced, "Ladies and gentlemen, I play the piano, but God is in the house tonight." The album was released on LP by Onyx Records in 1973, and was produced by Newman and Don Schlitten. HighNote Records issued a CD version in 1998.

Tatum, who died in 1956, was awarded the 1973 Grammy for Best Jazz Performance by a Soloist for his performances on the album. Dan Morgenstern won the Grammy Award for Best Album Notes.

Critic Doug Ramsey wrote in 2015: "I'm recommending it now out of concern that some of you may have deprived yourselves of these indispensable snapshots of Tatum's genius." The AllMusic reviewer commented that the recordings had higher audio quality than other Newman releases, and described the album as "Highly recommended."

== Track listing ==
Side one

1. "Georgia on My Mind"
2. "Beautiful Love"
3. "Laughing at Life"
4. "Sweet Lorraine"
5. "Fine and Dandy"
6. "Begin the Beguine"
7. "Mighty Lak a Rose"
8. "Knockin' Myself Out"

Side two

1. "Toledo Blues"
2. "Body and Soul"
3. "There'll Be Some Changes Made"
4. "Lady Be Good"
5. "Sweet Georgia Brown"

== Personnel ==
- Art Tatum – piano, vocals (tracks 1–8, 2–1)
- Reuben Harris – percussion (tracks 1–4, 1–5, 1–6)
- Chocolate Williams – bass (tracks 1–7, 1–8, 2–1, 2–2, 2–3), vocals (tracks 1–7, 1–8, 2–1, 2–2)
- Ollie Potter – vocals (track 2–3)
- Frankie Newton – trumpet (tracks 2–4, 2–5)
- Ebenezer Paul – bass (tracks 2–4, 2–5)
