= Cecil Scott =

American jazz musician and bandleader (1905–1964)

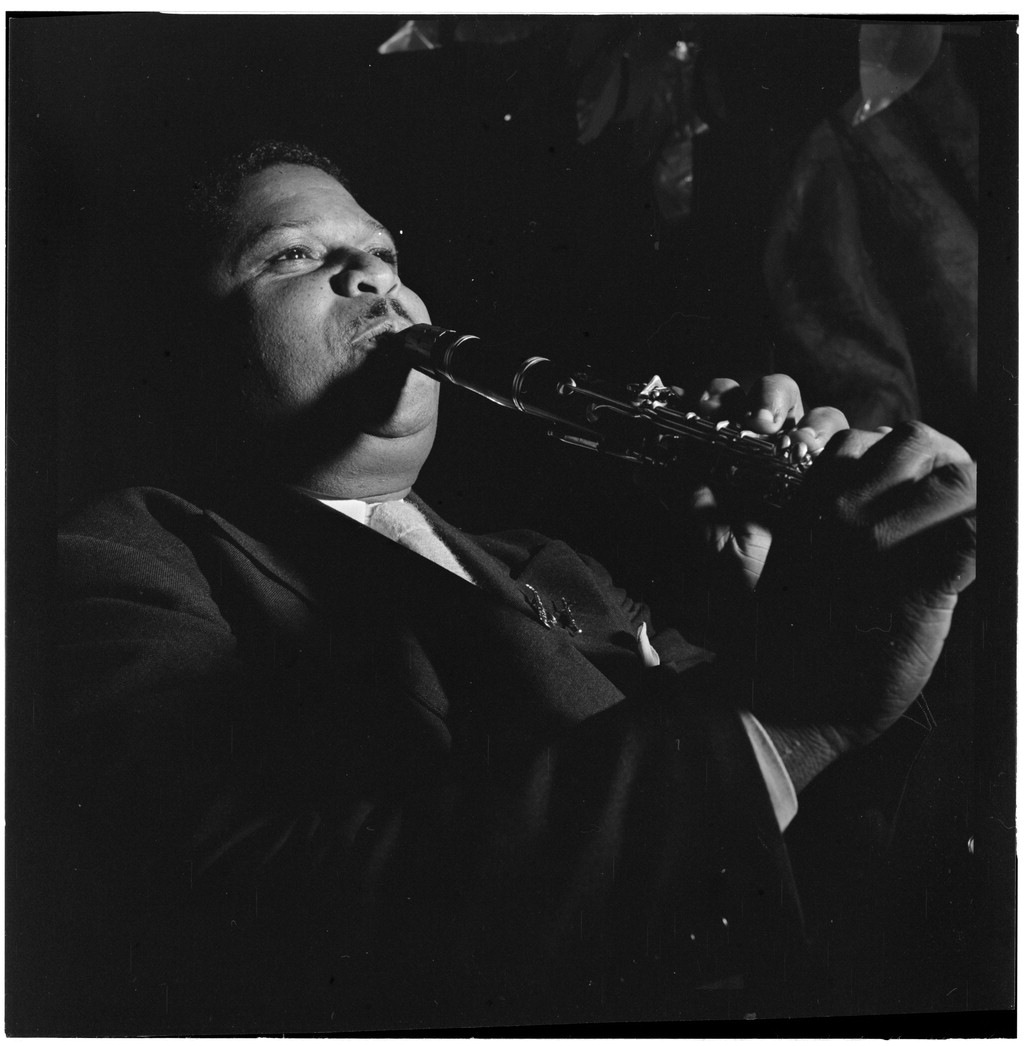
- Cecil Scott, Ole South, New York, c. Oct. 1946.

Background information
- Born: November 22, 1905; Springfield, Ohio, U.S.
- Died: January 5, 1964 (aged 58) New York City, U.S.
- Occupation: Jazz musician
- Instruments: Clarinet, tenor saxophone

Cecil Scott (November 22, 1905 in Springfield, Ohio – January 5, 1964 in New York City) was an American jazz clarinetist, tenor saxophonist, and bandleader.

Scott played as a teenager with his brother, drummer Lloyd Scott. They played together as co-leaders through the end of the 1920s, holding residencies in Ohio, Pittsburgh, and in New York City at the Savoy Ballroom. Among the members of this ensemble were Dicky Wells, Frankie Newton, Bill Coleman, Roy Eldridge, Johnny Hodges, and Chu Berry. Cecil took full control over the group in 1929, though Lloyd continued to manage the group.

Scott was severely injured in the leg during an accident in the early 1930s, and his career was temporarily sidelined. After his recovery he played with Ellsworth Reynolds in 1932-33 and then with Teddy Hill (from 1936), Clarence Williams, and Teddy Wilson (1936–37); in the latter gig he accompanied Billie Holiday. In the early 1940s, he played with Alberto Socarras, Red Allen, Willie "The Lion" Smith before assembling his own band in 1942, which at times included Hot Lips Page and Art Hodes. He also played with Slim Gaillard later in the 1940s.

In 1950, he disbanded the group, and worked with Jimmy McPartland as a sideman. He occasionally led groups and continued to play as a sideman up until the time of his death in 1964. He is credited on some 75 albums.
