= Ismay Duvivier =

American nurse

- Ismay Duvivier, in about 1930
- Born: Ismay Blakely; August 27, 1903; St. Croix, Virgin Islands
- Died: February 6, 2004 (aged 100); New York, US
- Occupations: Dancer, nurse
- Children: George Duvivier

Ismay Blakely Duvivier (August 27, 1903 – February 6, 2004) was an American dancer and nurse, born in Saint Croix. Her collection of Harlem Renaissance and later jazz memorabilia and photographs, from her own and her son's careers, is now held in the Institute of Jazz Studies at Rutgers University.

== Early life ==
Ismay Blakely was born in Saint Croix in the Virgin Islands, then a part of the Danish West Indies. She moved to the United States as a child with her parents, George Alexander Blakely and Beatrice Peebles Blakely, and was raised in New York City. She graduated from high school in 1919.

== Career ==
After 1929, to support her son and widowed mother, Duvivier worked a dancer and a chorus girl. She danced at the Cotton Club, performed with Cab Calloway and Ethel Waters, and toured the eastern United States in various productions. In 1929 she appeared in an early short musical film, On the Levee, with singer Jules Bledsoe. She left her performing career in 1932; she remembered later, "I got tired of being away from home and was disgusted with fighting guys off." She became a nurse at Lincoln Hospital, where she worked until 1962. In retirement, she supported her son's musical career, and maintained a collection of photographs and memorabilia that became useful to jazz scholars.

== Personal life ==
Ismay Blakely married Jamaican-born World War I army medic Leon Vincent Duvivier in 1920; they had a son, George Duvivier, born later that year. She lived with her son, a noted jazz musician, arranger and composer, until he died from cancer in 1985. She died in 2004, aged 100 years, in New York. She donated the Ismay and George Duvivier Papers, including their letters and her scrapbooks of her own and her son's careers in show business, to the Institute of Jazz Studies at Rutgers University.
