= Beason (surname) =

Beason is a surname. Notable people with the surname include:

- Bill Beason (1908–1988), American swing jazz drummer
- Doug Beason (born 1953), American science fiction author
- Jon Beason (born 1985), American football linebacker
- Scott Beason (born 1969), American talk radio host and politician
- Tanner Beason (born 1997), American soccer player
