= Dicky Wells =

American jazz trombonist (1907–1985)

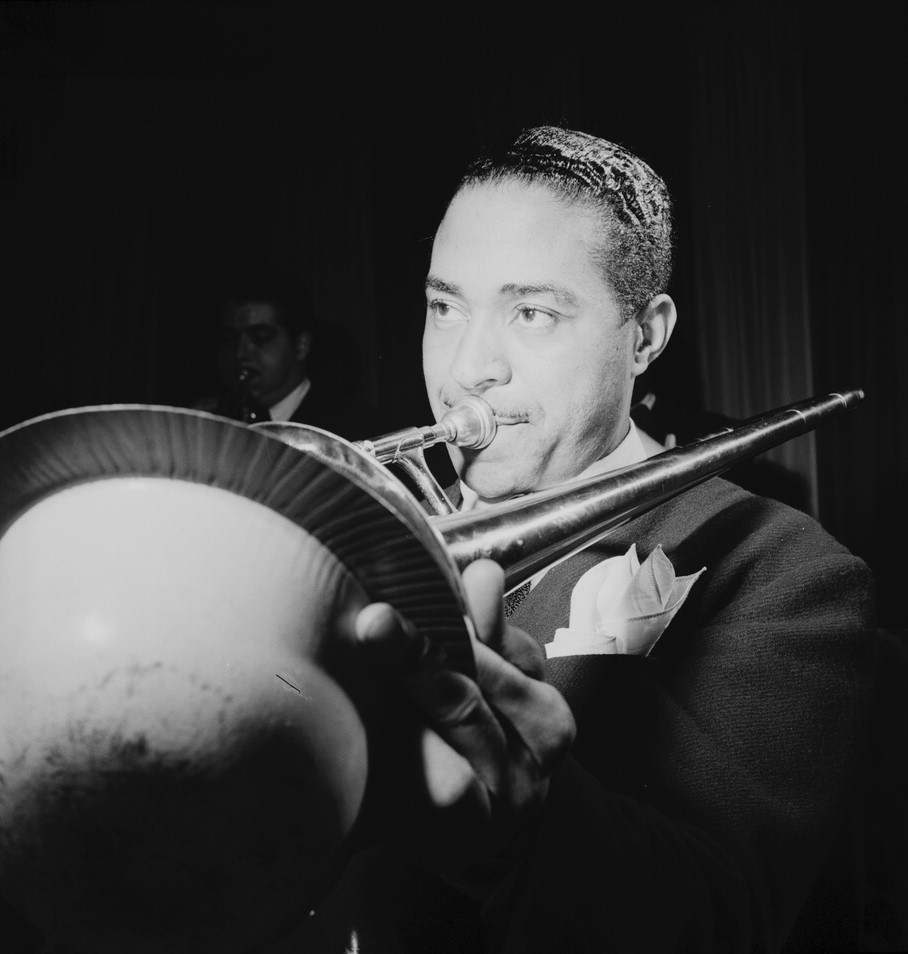
- Photo of Wells by William P. Gottlieb

Background information
- Born: William Wells; June 10, 1907; Centerville, Tennessee, U.S.
- Died: November 12, 1985 (aged 78) New York City
- Genres: Jazz
- Occupation: Musician
- Instrument: Trombone

William Wells (June 10, 1907 or 1909 – November 12, 1985), known professionally as Dicky Wells (sometimes Dickie Wells), was an American jazz trombonist.

== Early life ==
Wells was born in Centerville, Tennessee. Early in his life, he lived in Centerville with his farmer father, George Washington Wells, and mother, Florence. Wells had a brother, Charlie or Henry Wells, and three sisters, Leona, Tenny, and Georgia.

Wells and his family moved to Nashville, Tennessee for some time where he started drinking whiskey from a bar. When Wells was ten years old his stepfather Felix Murray moved the family to Louisville, Kentucky. Wells' mother was absent as she was traveling with his stepfather so his sister, Leona, took care of him and his brother. Both of Wells' parents died within a year of each other which took its toll on him.

== Early career ==
While living in Louisville, Wells started playing in a band that was sponsored by the Booker T. Washington Community Center. This band consisted of players such as Jonah Jones, Bill Beason, Buddy Lee, and Helen Humes. The instruments were provided by Miss Bessie Allen and they were conducted by Lockwood Lewis and they traveled in a truck to play at county fairs. Wells started out playing the baritone horn but later took on the trombone as he had broken the only baritone horn they had. Wells played with this band until they decreased to a seven-piece jazz band that played funerals, parades, and parties all around Kentucky.

Wells’ first paid band job was with Lucius Brown at the Eight Mile House until a train wreck happened in Kentucky. He and the band were sitting in the back when an oil truck collided with the train and caused an explosion. The band had no casualties but the band was injured.

After a performance at Lyon's Garden, Lloyd Scott convinced him to move to Springfield to join the Bright Boys. They lived in the Sterling Hotel, in Cincinnati, Ohio until they all went to New York after Buchanan of the Savory Ballroom heard them play in Pittsburgh, Pennsylvania.

In the next few years, he played in numerous orchestras led by musicians including Benny Carter, Spike Hughes, and Fletcher Henderson. Wells replaced J.C. Higginbotham in Henderson's band in the 1930s. During this time, Wells interacted with stars like Coleman Hawkins and Henry "Red" Allen. Wells then toured with the Teddy Hill band in the late 1930s in Paris where he was recruited by jazz critic, Hugues Panassié to play for him with guitarist Django Reinhardt and trumpet player, Bill Coleman. His work there resulted with two successful recorded sessions that were under his name.

== Basie years ==
Wells was invited to Count Basie's house in 1938 because Herschel Evans and Lester Young saw his work with Hill. He was taken to play with the band at a country club in Plainfield, New Jersey which led him to get hired for a six-week show at the Famous Door. The band performed well enough to spend three months in performance. Wells was asked by Basie if he would like to continue playing with them, which he agreed to.

Wells ended up staying in Basie's band for a total of eleven years, from 1938 to 1945 and again from 1947 to 1950. He took a break due to his trouble with his tonsils and "stomach disorders". Wells was supported by Basie and the band to take this break and he was able to spend some time working with other individuals such as Lucky Millinder and J. C. Heard.

== Well's style ==
Wells' tone is noted for being speak-like and was able to emulate sounds that expressed human emotions. Wells was able to use his expertise of the slide to manipulate his tone with vibrato and inflection. He frequently used what he called, "terminal vibrato" which was an integral part of Wells' style. This technique is notably used in his contributions to Spike Hughes' Music at Midnight / Music at Sunrise (Decca, 1933) and Basie's Panassié Stomp (Decca, 1938).

== Late career ==
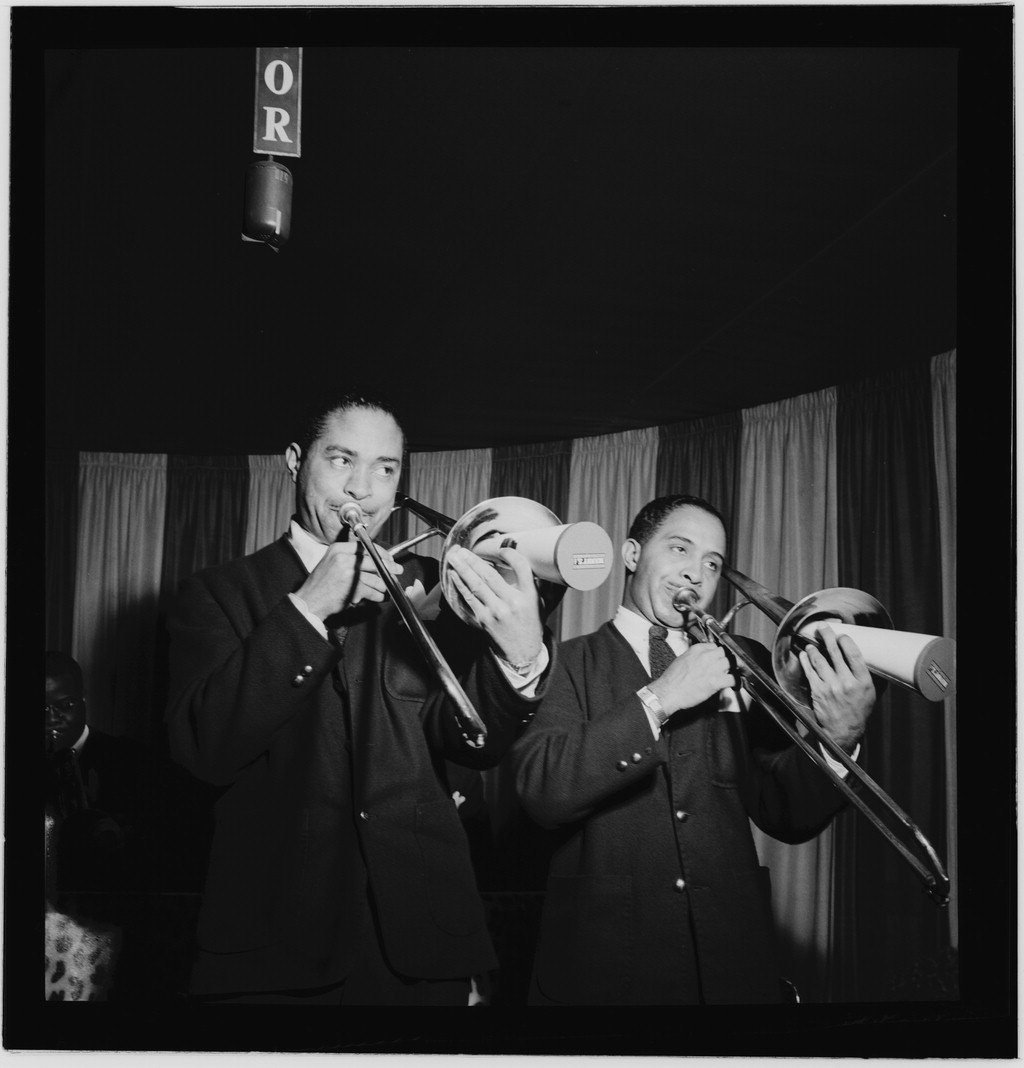
Dicky Wells (left) and brother Henry Wells at Eddie Condon's of New York City in January 1947

Wells returned to Europe in 1953 and played with Coleman and Zutty Singleton. During his time there, Wells came to the realization about his drinking habits and started decreasing his consumption. Despite his personal troubles, he continued to tour but with Buck Clayton in many European countries such as Paris, London, Italy, Sweden, and Denmark.

In October 1961, Wells made his first appearance in Ray Charles' band where he extensively toured and worked with them for three months. Wells worked all that he could, but before the band went to Paris, he ended up leaving the band due to health conditions. He later played in B. B. King's band at the Apollo Theatre in Harlem.

In his later years, Wells suffered a severe beating during a mugging that affected his memory, but he recovered and continued to perform. He played frequently at the West End jazz club at 116th and Broadway, most often with a band called The Countsmen, led by alto saxophonist Earle Warren, his colleague from Count Basie days. A trademark of Wells was his "pepper pot" mute, which he made himself.

== Death ==
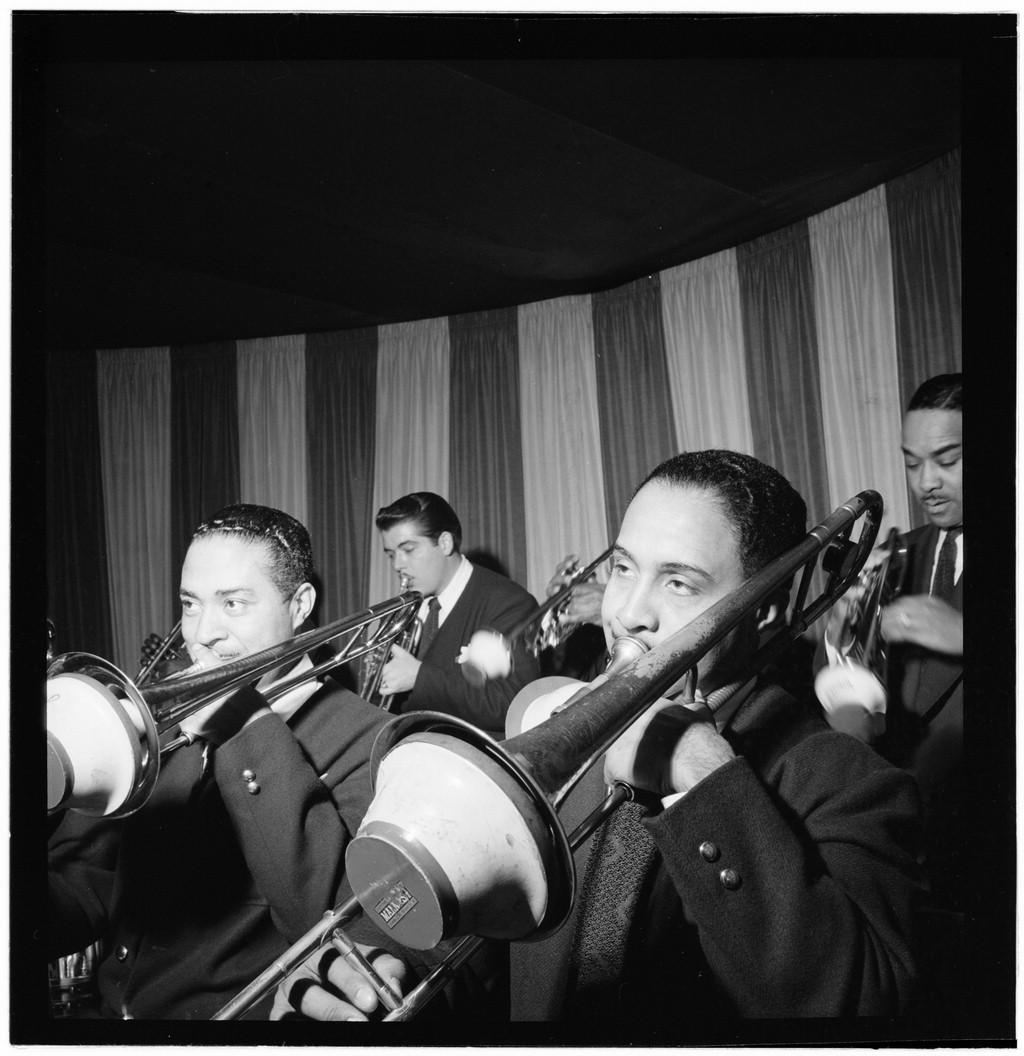
Dicky Wells (left) and brother Henry Wells at Eddie Condon's of New York City in January 1947

Wells died of cancer on November 12, 1985, in New York City. Shortly after his death, Wells's family donated his trombone to the Rutgers University Institute of Jazz Studies.

== Discography ==
=== As leader ===
- Bones for the King (Felsted, 1958)
- Trombone Four-in-Hand (Felsted, 1959)
- Chatter Jazz with Rex Stewart (RCA Victor, 1959)
- Heavy Duty! (Vocalion, 1965)
- Dicky Wells in Paris 1937 (Prestige, 1968)
- Lonesome Road (Uptown, 1981)
- The Stanley Dance Sessions (Lone Hill, 2005)
- Dicky Wells with the Alex Welsh Band (Jazzology, 2011)

=== As sideman ===
With Lloyd Scott

- Harlem Shuffle (Victor, 1927)
- Symphonic Scrontch (Victor, 1927)
- Happy Hour Blues (Victor, 1927)

With Teddy Hill

- Lookie, Lookie, Here Comes Cookie (Banner, 1935)
- When the Robin Sings His Song Again (Banner, 1935)
- Uptown Rhapsody (Vocalion, 1936)
- At the Rug Cutters’ Ball (Vocalion, 1936)
- Blue Rhythm Fantasy (Vocalion, 1936)
- Passionate (Vocalion, 1936)

With Count Basie

- Blues by Basie (Columbia, 1956)
- The Count (RCA Camden, 1958)
- The Count Swings Out (Coral, 1959)

With Buck Clayton

- Songs for Swingers (Columbia, 1959)
- Goin' to Kansas City (Riverside, 1960)
- One for Buck (Columbia, 1962)
- Copenhagen Concert (SteepleChase, 1979)

With Jimmy Rushing

- The Jazz Odyssey of Jimmy Rushing (Philips, 1957)
- Little Jimmy Rushing and the Big Brass (Columbia, 1958)
- Every Day I Have the Blues (Bluesway, 1967)
- Livin' the Blues (Bluesway, 1968)

With others

- James Brown, Live at the Apollo (1963 album) (King, 1963)
- Vic Dickenson & Joe Thomas, Mainstream (Atlantic, 1958)
- Dizzy Gillespie, The Complete RCA Victor Recordings (Bluebird, 1995)
- Tommy Gwaltney, Goin' to Kansas City (Riverside, 1960)
- Nancy Harrow, Wild Women Don't Have the Blues (Candid, 1961)
- John Lee Hooker, It Serve You Right to Suffer (Impulse!, 1966)
- Spike Hughes, Spike Hughes and His All American Orchestra (London 1933 1956)
- Frankie Laine & Buck Clayton, Jazz Spectacular (Columbia, 1956)
- Jay McShann, The Big Apple Bash (Atlantic, 1979)
- Red Prysock, Fruit Boots (Mercury, 1957)
- Rex Stewart, Henderson Homecoming (United Artists, 1959)
- Buddy Tate, Swinging Like Tate (Felsted, 1958)
