= Gentry McCreary =

American gospel music executive (born 1941)

- Also known as: Uncle Gentry
- Born: Gentry McCreary; 19 September 1941 (age 84); Oakland, California
- Genres: Gospel music
- Occupation: Gospel music executive
- Years active: 1970–2015
- Labels: Shelter Records; Birthright Records; Word Records; Light Records; The Benson Group; Luminar Records; Onyx Int'l Records

Gentry McCreary Sr. (born September 19, 1941) is a gospel music executive. He's most noted as the first African-American executive to be employed by Word Records, Light Records and Benson Records. McCreary's achievements also include the development of his own labels, Luminar and Onyx International Records.

== Early years ==
Gentry McCreary's music career began in 1964 when he became the manager of the Gospel group called "The Heavenly Tones". They wenton to recorded an album entitled "I Love the Lord" in 1966 that was produced by the legendary Reverend James Cleveland in the city Los Angeles, California. By 1967 Mary McCreary, Vet Stewart, and Elva "Tiny" Mouton collaborated with Sly and the Family Stone, a venture that lead to the formation of Sly's Little Sister in 1969. The group later released a single entitled You Are The One. By 1972 McCreary organized a choir called The New Generation Singers which toured all over the Local Bay Area. As time progressed, McCreary managed the dealings for Mary McCreary's debut solo album entitled Butterflies in Heaven which was released in 1973 on Shelter Records. Mary's second solo album released on Shelter Records, was entitled Jezebel which was distributed by MCA Records.

== Musical career ==
Birthright Records ignited McCreary's career in the late '60s when hiring him in their radio promotions department. There, he promoted artists such as The Caravans, Rodena Preston and Edwin Hawkins. In the early '70s, Word Records hired the Oakland native as its director of promotions for Black Radio—making him the first Black executive ever hired by the label. While at Word, McCreary experienced phenomenal success promoting artists such as Leon Patillo, Larnell Harris and Billy Preston.

A pivotal move for McCreary occurred in the late '70s, when Light Records hired him as director of national radio promotions. Light was quickly becoming an industry leader in Black gospel music, as McCreary worked with the likes of Walter Hawkins, Tramaine Hawkins, Andraé Crouch, Jessy Dixon and The Winans. The company rewarded McCreary's promotion of these artists by giving him his own record label, Luminar Records. McCreary wasted no time building his list of achievements as he signed an unknown artist named Rev. James Moore. Moore went on to receive a 1982 Dove Award nomination for Inspirational Gospel Album of the Year.

Throughout the 1980s McCreary is credited with pitching the highly circulated hymnal "Yes Lord" to leaders of the Church of God in Christ organization. McCreary also began work at a new label in the early '80s—Benson Records. There, he held the title International Director of Radio Promotions, before Benson granted him a solo label called Onyx International Records. New artists such as Richard Smallwood, Vanessa Bell Armstrong, Thomas Whitfield, The New York City Family, Danniebelle Hall and Bishop Paul S. Morton signed on with Onyx. In conjunction with the newly signed artists, Onyx released Mel Carter's album entitled Willing that earned a Dove Nomination. By the mid-1980s, McCreary had accepted a position at Plumbline Records as the vice president of A&R. While at Plumbline, he signed new artists such as Daryl Coley, LeCresia Campbell, and Rickey Grundy. It was during this time that he presented talent at Midem, the International Music Market in Cannes, France.

In the early 1990s PepperCo Records hired him as senior VP and director of A&R where he signed unknown new artists, as Yvette Flunder, Shirley Miller, and Dominion & Power, among others. Later, he accepted a position at Ocean Records as head of the Black Gospel division where he worked with artists such as Sisters, Prophet Calvin Suggs, David R. Curry Jr. Presents The Mississippi Mass Fine Arts and Seminar Choir, Edgar O'Neal & The Faith United Inspirational Choir. It was during this period that McCreary also co-founded Red Hot Music Group and developed Gentry McCreary Presents, which introduced James H. Brown & Company, and Derick Hughes.

McCreary has won various Gospel Industry awards, including the Bay Area's Black Diamond Dynasty Living Legend Award, and Producer of the Year. In 2008, he was awarded the first "Lilly Mack Pioneer's Award" for his dedication to the gospel music industry. In September 2010, McCreary received his first Lifetime Achievement Award for the Impact of Music in Ministry by the city of Temecula, California McCreary currently owns McCreary & Associates, a consulting company for major and independent artists and label executive.

== Discography ==
McCreary served as executive producer for all of the following albums:

- Mary McCreary – Butterflies in Heaven (1973 Shelter Records)
- Mary McCreary – Jezebel (1974 Shelter Records)
- Danniebelle Hall – Unmistakably Danniebelle (1978 Onyx Int'l Records/Benson Records)
- Richard Smallwood – Richard Smallwood Singers (1982 Onyx Int'l Records/Benson Records)
- Vanessa Bell Armstrong – Peace Be Still (1983 Onyx Int'l Records/Benson Records)
- Dannibelle Hall – Song of the Angels (1983 Onyx Int'l Records/Benson Records)
- Thomas Whitfield – Hold Me (1983 Onyx Int'l Records/Benson Records)
- Bishop Paul S. Morton – Jesus, When Troubles Burden Me Down (1983 Onyx Int'l Records/Benson Records)
- Thomas Whitfield – Halleujah Anyhow (1984 Onyx Int'l Records/Benson Records)
- Mel Carter – Willing (1984 Onyx Int'l Records/Benson Records)
- Vanessa Bell Armstrong – Chosen (1984 Onyx Int'l Records/Benson Records)
- Richard Smallwood – Psalms (1984 Onyx Int'l Records/Benson Records)
- Lacresia Campbell – Draw Me Near (1984 Plumbline Records)
- Just Daryl – Just Daryl (1986 Plumbline Records)

== Awards ==
- Lifetime Achievement Award for the Impact of Music in Ministry
- Lilly Mack Pioneer's Award
- Producer Of The Year.
