= Freddy Taylor (musician) =

American jazz musician

Freddy Taylor, also Freddie Taylor, was an American jazz singer, trumpeter, dancer, and bandleader of swing.

== Biography ==
Taylor started his career as a dancer in the New York Cotton Club in the 1930s. With Lucky Millinder's orchestra he came to Europe in 1933, where he worked from then on with his own formations. On the trumpet he got lessons from Bill Coleman. Charlie Johnson, Chester Lanier, Fletcher Allen and guitarist Oscar Alemán also played in his quintet. Taylor is remembered most of all by his sessions with Django Reinhardt, in which he recorded the jazz standards "Shine", "I'se Muggin'", "I Can't Give You Anything But Love", "After You've Gone", "Georgia on My Mind" and "Nagasaki".

The year before, recordings for the label Oriole ("Blue Drag", "Viper's Dream") were made with his band, Freddy Taylor & His Swing Men from Harlem. In Paris, he later took over the management of a club on Montmartre; he also appeared in Rotterdam with his own group. In 1937 he directed an orchestra in the Coliseum, which included Louis Vola, Freddy Johnson and Noël Chiboust: In the 1940s, Taylor returned to the United States and appeared until the late 1960s.

== Discographic Notes ==
- Django Reinhardt: Americans in Paris (Naxos, 1935–1937)
- Django Reinhardt: Swing Guitars (Naxos, 1936–1937)
- Django Reinhardt: With Vocals (Naxos, 1933–1941)
