= Marshall Stearns =

American jazz critic and musicologist (1908–1966)

- Born: Marshall Winslow Stearns; October 18, 1908; Cambridge, Massachusetts, U.S.
- Died: December 18, 1966 (aged 58); Key West, Florida, U.S.
- Education: Harvard University; Yale University
- Occupations: Jazz critic and musicologist
- Known for: Founder of the Institute of Jazz Studies

Marshall Winslow Stearns (October 18, 1908 – December 18, 1966) was an American jazz critic and musicologist. He was the founder of the Institute of Jazz Studies.

== Biography ==
Stearns was born in Cambridge, Massachusetts, to Edith Baker Winslow (maiden; Edith Baker Winslow; 1878–1952) and Harry Ney Stearns (1874–1930). His father was a Harvard University graduate and an attorney.

Stearns played drums in his teens, and attended Harvard University, where, in 1931, he earned a Bachelor of Arts degree. He also attended Harvard Law School from 1932 to 1934, but did not graduate. He went on to study medieval English at Yale University, where, in 1942, he earned a PhD.

He served in a series of academic appointments on the English faculties of the University of Hawaii (1939–1941), Indiana University (1942–1946), and Cornell University (1946–1949). His foray into teaching jazz began in 1950 at New York University (1950–1951) and continued, beginning in 1951, at Hunter College, where Stearns became a professor. While working in academia, he wrote about jazz music for several magazines, including Variety, Saturday Review, Down Beat, The Record Changer (de), Esquire, Harper's, Life, and Musical America.

In 1950, Stearns was awarded a Guggenheim Fellowship and he used the proceeds to finish his 1956 work The Story of Jazz, which became a widely used text, as well as a popular introduction to jazz.

In 1952, he founded the Institute of Jazz Studies, which he directed. Later in the 1950s, he was a consultant to the United States State Department, and accompanied Dizzy Gillespie on a tour of the Middle East in 1956 sponsored by the office. Stearns taught at the New School for Social Research (1954–61) and the School of Jazz in Lenox, Massachusetts.

Stearns died on December 18, 1966, in Key West, Florida.

He and his second wife, Jean, co-authored Jazz Dance: The Story of American Vernacular Dance, which was published posthumously in 1968.

== Family ==
Stearns was married twice. He was first married on October 18, 1931, in Yonkers, New York, to Betty Stearns (née Elizabeth Dixon; 1909–1996), whose father, Joseph Moore Dixon (1867–1934), was, from 1921 to 1925, the seventh Governor of Montana.

Stearns then married – in October 1956, in Manhattan, New York – Jean Stearns (née Jean Barnett; born 1922). Jean was from White Hall, Illinois, and had attended MacMurray College (class of 1943), but transferred to the University of Illinois at Urbana–Champaign, where, in 1945, she earned a Bachelor of Arts in English. Her mother, Helen Barnett (née Helen Isabell Beaty; 1889–1981), was a music teacher in White Hall. Jean's father, Fleet Barnett (né Ralph Fleetwood Barnett; 1895–1981), owned and operated a pottery shop in White Hall.
