= Lloyd Scott (musician) =

American jazz musician (1902–1959)

Lloyd William Scott (August 22, 1902 – December 21, 1959) was an American jazz drummer and bandleader.

== Life and career ==
Lloyd William Scott was born in Springfield, Ohio, on August 22, 1902.

In the 1920s Lloyd and his brother Cecil Scott co-led an ensemble which initially played locally in Ohio, then moved on to play in Pittsburgh and then Harlem. At various times they performed as Cecil Scott and His Bright Boys and Lloyd Scott's Symphonic Syncopators, changing their name often (as was common among early jazz ensembles). Among the sidemen in this ensemble were Dicky Wells, Frankie Newton, Bill Coleman, Roy Eldridge, Johnny Hodges, and Chu Berry. As Lloyd Scott and His Orchestra, they recorded in 1927; these were Wells's first appearance on record. After 1929 Lloyd gave up active performance in the band and became its manager, and it performed as Cecil Scott's Bright Boys until its dissolution.

While Cecil went on to perform widely as a sideman, Lloyd did little further work in music, and was generally forgotten until a resurgence in interest in Harlem Renaissance jazz bands in the 1980s. He died in Cleveland, Ohio, on December 21, 1959, at the age of 57.
