= Dan Morgenstern =

American jazz historian (1929–2024)

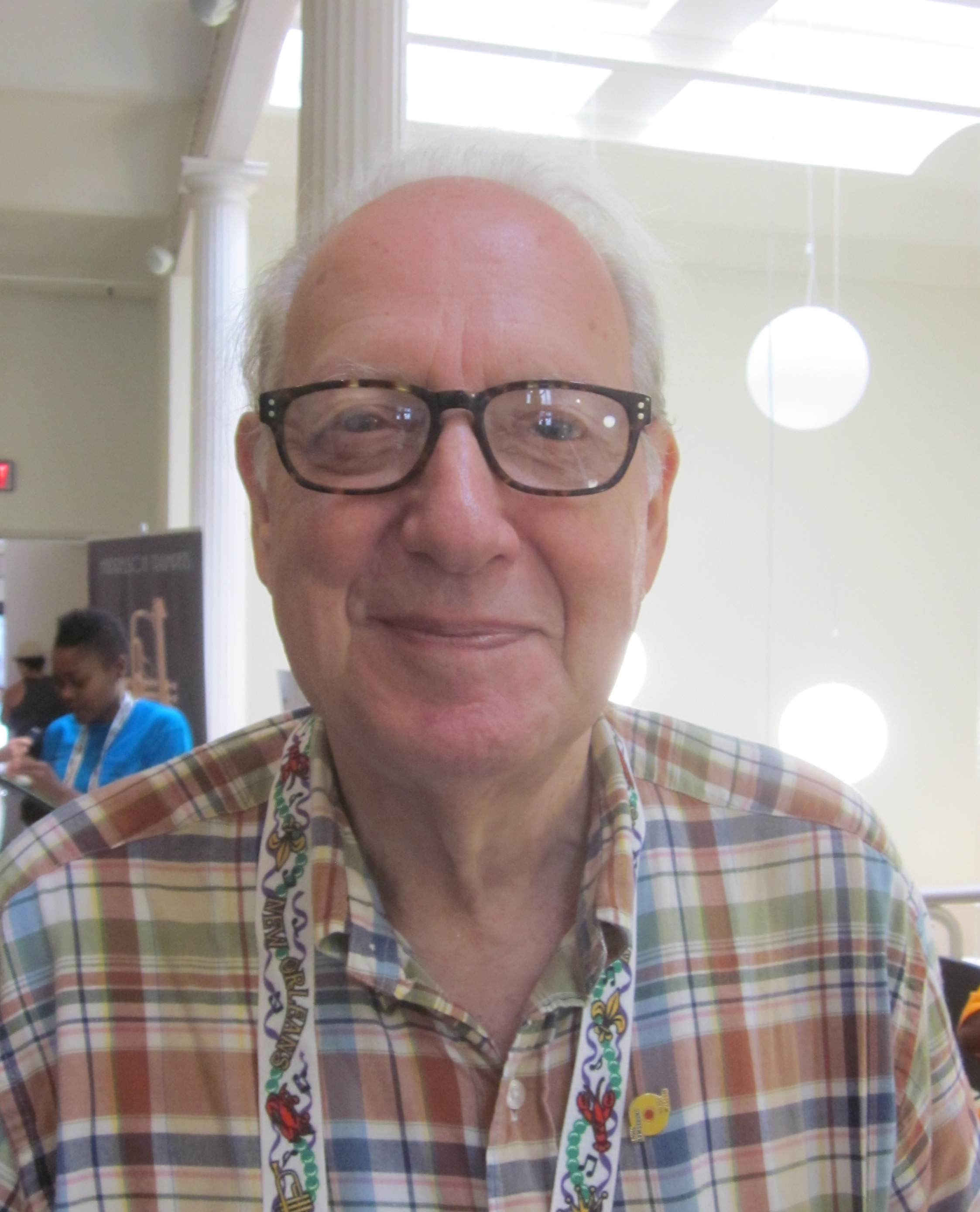
- Morgenstern in 2012
- Born: October 24, 1929; Munich, Bavaria, Germany
- Died: September 7, 2024 (aged 94); New York City, U.S.
- Education: Brandeis University
- Occupations: Journalist, archivist, writer
- Spouses: Lenore Avin (divorced); Elsa Schochet (m. 1974)
- Children: 2
- Writing career
- Subject: Jazz
- Notable awards: NEA Jazz Masters (2007); 8 Grammy Award for Best Album Notes

Dan Michael Morgenstern (October 24, 1929 – September 7, 2024) was an American jazz historian and archivist. Born to a Jewish family in Germany, Morgenstern fled Nazi-occupied Austria with his mother and in 1947 emigrated to the United States. He first began visiting jazz clubs as a teenager and worked at The New York Times. After serving in the U.S. Army, he attended Brandeis University where he first began writing about jazz music. He went on to become a professional jazz critic and editor. Morgenstern led several jazz magazines and directed the Institute of Jazz Studies at Rutgers University from 1976 to 2012. He earned eight Grammy Awards for his album liner notes and wrote two books on jazz.

== Early life and career ==
Morgenstern was the only child of a Danish-Jewish mother, Ingeborg von Klenau, and Jewish-Ukrainian writer Soma Morgenstern. He was born in Munich on October 24, 1929, and was raised in Vienna. His mother was the daughter of the Danish composer and conductor Paul von Klenau. His father, the son of Hasidic Jews from what is now Ukraine, was a novelist, journalist and playwright. He had a cultured upbringing; the family's friends included the composer Alban Berg, who gave Morgenstern a recording of Mozart's Eine Kleine Nachtmusik for his sixth birthday.

When the Nazis came to power, Morgenstern's father lost his job as Viennese cultural correspondent on a German newspaper and was placed on a Gestapo blacklist. The family fled Austria following the Nazi annexation of the country. Morgenstern's father escaped to Paris; eight-year-old Daniel and his mother, with Danish nationality, took refuge in Copenhagen, where he saw American jazz pianist Fats Waller in concert. After the German invasion of Denmark, he and his mother were smuggled out of Denmark to Sweden in a fishing boat by the Danish resistance in October 1943. Morgenstern spent the war years in a boarding school in Stockholm. He fell in love with jazz after hearing Fats Waller and Django Reinhardt play a concert in Copenhagen.

Morgenstern arrived in the United States in 1947 and was reunited with his father in New York City. He worked at The New York Times as a copy boy. He was enthralled with New York City's jazz scene and began sneaking into jazz clubs as a 17-year old. During the Korean War, he was drafted into the U.S. Army and was stationed in Munich. After his army service, he took advantage of the G.I. Bill and studied history at Brandeis University in Boston. While there, he wrote about jazz for the university newspaper and organized concerts on campus for jazz musicians such as pianist Art Tatum and saxophonist Stan Getz.

Morgenstern wrote thousands of articles for magazines, newspapers and journals. He reviewed records for the Chicago Sun-Times. He returned to New York City by the late 1950s. After graduating from Brandeis, he became a jazz critic at the New York Post. He wrote for the British Jazz Journal from 1958 to 1961, then edited several jazz magazines: Metronome in 1961, Jazz from 1962 to 1963, and DownBeat from 1964 to 1973, where he began as New York editor and became chief editor. In 1976 he was made director of the Institute of Jazz Studies at Rutgers University in Newark, New Jersey, where he continued the work of Marshall Stearns and made the Institute the world's largest repository of jazz documents, recordings, and memorabilia. The institute's collection "grew fivefold" under his management. When he retired in 2012 he was acknowledged as one of the foremost authorities on jazz.

Over the course of his career, Morgenstern arranged concerts and produced and hosted television and radio programs. He taught courses on jazz history at Brooklyn College, New York University, and the Peabody Institute of Johns Hopkins University. He was a prolific writer of comprehensive and authoritative liner notes, a sideline that won him eight Grammy Awards for Best Album Notes from 1973 on. Morgenstern was the author of two books: Jazz People (1976); and Living with Jazz (2004), a reader edited by Sheldon Meyer (1926–2006). Both won ASCAP's Deems Taylor Award. In 2007, Morgenstern received the A.B. Spellman Jazz Masters Award for Jazz Advocacy from the National Endowment for the Arts.

== Personal life and death ==
Morgenstern married twice. He divorced his first wife, Lenore Avin. He married again in 1974 to Elsa "Ellie" Schochet, with whom he remained until his death; the couple had two sons, Adam and Joshua.

Morgenstern died from heart failure in Manhattan, on September 7, 2024, at the age of 94.

== Grammy Awards for Best Album Notes ==
- Art Tatum, God Is in the House (1973)
- Coleman Hawkins, The Hawk Flies (1974)
- Various (Savoy Records collection), The Changing Face of Harlem (1976)
- Erroll Garner, Erroll Garner: Master of the Keyboard (1981)
- Clifford Brown, Brownie: The Complete Emarcy Recordings of Clifford Brown (1990)
- Louis Armstrong, Portrait of the Artist as a Young Man (1994)
- Fats Waller, If You Got to Ask, You Ain't Got It! (2006)
- Louis Armstrong, The Complete Louis Armstrong Decca Sessions (1935–1946) (2010)
