= Brick Fleagle =

American jazz guitarist (1906–1992)

- Fleagle in New York City, c. 1947; by William P. Gottlieb

Background information
- Born: Jacob Roger Fleagle; August 22, 1906; Hanover, Pennsylvania, U.S.
- Died: April 15, 1992 (aged 85)
- Genre: Jazz
- Occupations: Musician; arranger; bandleader
- Instruments: Guitar; banjo

Jacob Roger "Brick" Fleagle (August 22, 1906 – April 15, 1992) was a jazz guitarist and arranger. He performed with leading musicians including Miles Davis and Duke Ellington. At one time, Fleagle had his own sixteen-piece band.
