= Grace Schulman =

American poet (born 1935)

- Born: Grace Jan Waldman; 1935 (age 90–91) New York City, U.S.
- Occupation: Poet
- Education: Bard College; American University; New York University (PhD)

Website
- graceschulman.com

Grace Schulman (born Grace Jan Waldman; 1935 in New York City) is an American poet.

Her work has appeared in the New Yorker, the New Republic, Paris Review, Antaeus, Grand Street, the Yale Review, the Hudson Review, Atlantic Monthly, and the Kenyon Review.

== Biography ==
Schulman studied at Bard College, and graduated from American University in 1955, and from New York University with a Ph.D. in 1971.

From 1972 to 2006 Schulman served as Poetry Editor of The Nation and from 1973 to 1985 as director of the Poetry Center, 92nd Street Y, where she founded a contest then called "Discovery—The Nation."

She is Distinguished Professor of English at Baruch College, City University of New York (CUNY), and has taught poetry writing at Princeton University, Columbia University, Wesleyan University, Bennington College, and Warren Wilson College.

== Awards ==
- Induction as Member, American Academy of Arts and Letters, 2019
- Frost Medal for Distinguished Lifetime Achievement in American Poetry, 2016
- Guggenheim Fellowship for Poetry, 2004–2005
- Aiken Taylor Award for Poetry, 2003
- Five Pushcart Prizes (Poetry), 21, 23, 27, 32, 46.
- Distinguished Alumni Award, New York University Graduate Arts and Sciences, 2003
- Finalist, Phi Beta Kappa Awards, 2002.
- Delmore Schwartz Award for Poetry, 1996.
- Poetry Fellowship from the New York Foundation of the Arts, 1995.
- "Best Poem of 2004," American Scholar.

== Works ==
=== Poetry ===
- Again, the Dawn: New and Selected Poems, 1976-2022. Turtle Point Press. 2022. ISBN 9781885983336.
- The Marble Bed. Turtle Point Press. 2020. ISBN 9781885983831.
- Without a Claim: Poems. Mariner Books, Houghton Mifflin Harcourt. 2013. ISBN 9780544073777.
- The Broken String. Houghton Mifflin Harcourt. 2007. ISBN 978-0-618-44370-3.
- Days of Wonder: New and Selected Poems. Boston, Massachusetts: Houghton Mifflin. 2002. ISBN 978-0-618-34082-8.
- The Paintings of Our Lives. Boston, Massachusetts: Houghton Mifflin. 2001. ISBN 978-0-618-15465-4.
- For That Day Only Sheep Meadow Press (Riverdale-on-Hudson, NY), 1994.
- Hemispheres Sheep Meadow Press (New York, NY), 1984.
- Burn Down the Icons. Princeton University Press (Princeton, NJ), 1976.

=== Memoir ===
- Strange Paradise: Portrait of a Marriage. Turtle Point Press. 2018. ISBN 9781885983527.

=== Editor ===
- Grace Schulman, ed. (2003). The Poems of Marianne Moore. Viking. ISBN 978-0-670-03198-6.
- Grace Schulman, ed. Mourning Songs: Poems of Sorrow and Beauty. New Directions 2019, ISBN 978-0-8112-2866-4

=== Criticism ===
- First Loves and Other Adventures. University of Michigan Press. 2010. ISBN 978-0-472-07087-9.
- Marianne Moore: The Poetry of Engagement. Urbana, Illinois: University of Illinois Press. 1986. ISBN 978-0-252-01270-9.
- Schulman, Grace, ed. (1974). Ezra Pound: A Collection of Criticism. McGraw-Hill. ISBN 978-0-07-055634-8.

=== Translator ===
- T. Carmi, At the Stone of Losses (poems), University of California Press (Berkeley, CA), 1983.
- Pablo Antonio Cuadra (1979). Songs of Cifar and the Sweet Sea: Selections from the "Songs of Cifar," 1967–1977. Translators Grace Schulman, Ann M. De Zavala. Columbia University Press. ISBN 978-0-231-04772-2.

=== Anthologies ===
- The Best American Poetry 1995, edited by David Lehman and Richard Howard.
- The Best of the Best American Poetry 1988–1998, edited by David Lehman and Harold Bloom.
- Pushcart Prizes 21, 23, 27, and 32.
- American Religious Poems, edited by Harold Bloom and Jesse Zuba.
- I Speak of the city, edited by Stephen Wolf.
- The Poetry Anthology,1912–2002, edited by Jospeph Parisi and Stephen Young.
- Hammer and Blaze: A Gathering of Contemporary Poets, edited by Ellen Bryant Voigt and Heather McHugh.
