= Bill Beason =

American jazz musician

William Beason
- Born: March 6, 1908; Louisville, Kentucky, U.S.
- Died: August 15, 1988 (aged 80); New York City, New York, U.S.
- Occupation: drummer

William Beason (March 6, 1908 – August 15, 1988) was an American swing jazz drummer. At the height of his career, he recorded with Django Reinhardt.

== Biography ==
Beason was born March 6, 1908, in Louisville, Kentucky. He attended Central High School there, along with classmates and future jazz musicians Helen Humes, Jonah Jones and Dicky Wells, and then Wilberforce University in Ohio, playing drums for Horace Henderson's Collegians while there.

In 1939, Beason took over the role of drummer in Ella Fitzgerald's orchestra from Chick Webb.

Beason died, aged 80, in New York City.

== Discography (in selection) ==
With Dickie Wells and his Orchestra (Richard Fullbright, Bill Beason, Django Reinhardt, Bill Coleman)

- 1937: Dinah ! / Nobody's Blues But My Own (Swing)
- 1937: Japanese Sandman / I Got Rhythm (Swing)
- 1937: I've Found A New Baby / Hot Club Blues (Swing)
- 1937: Bugle Call Rag / Between The Devil And The Deep Blue Sea (Swing)
- 1937: Sweet Sue / Hangin' Around Boudon (Swing)
- 1940: Hangin' Around Boudon / I've Found A New Baby (Victor)

With Ella Fitzgerald and her Orchestra

- 1974: Live From The Roseland Ballroom, New York 1940 (Sunbeam)
- 1987: Jazz Live & Rare (Delta)

== See also ==
- List of people from the Louisville metropolitan area
