= Institute of Jazz Studies =

Library and archive in Newark, New Jersey, US

The Institute of Jazz Studies (IJS) is the largest and most comprehensive library and archives of jazz and jazz-related materials in the world. It is located on the fourth floor of the John Cotton Dana Library at Rutgers University–Newark in Newark, New Jersey, United States. The archival collection contains more than 100,000 sound recordings on CDs, LPs, EPs, 78- and 75-rpm disks, and 6,000 books. It also houses more than 30 instruments used by prominent jazz musicians.

The Jazz Studies academic program at Rutgers for music students is separate from the library and is part of the Mason Gross School of the Arts at the university.

In 2013, the institute was designated a Literary Landmark by New Jersey's Center for the Book in the National Registry of the Library of Congress. It is the fifth place in New Jersey to be given this designation, after the Newark Public Library, Paterson Public Library, the Walt Whitman House and the Joyce Kilmer Tree, which is located at Rutgers University–New Brunswick.

Major collections housed in the Institute include the Jazz Oral History Project, the Mary Lou Williams collection, the Women In Jazz collection, the Benny Carter Audio collection, and the Benny Goodman Audio collection.

== History ==
In 1952, the Institute of Jazz Studies was founded by Marshall Stearns, a jazz scholar, literature professor, and author. Stearns had a plan for a jazz institute as early as 1949, which he thought to call the "Institute of Modern American Music". It was originally located at his apartment at 108 Waverly Place in New York City. Marshall Stearns described the Institute of Jazz Studies' mission in 1953 as the following:

The general aim of the Institute of Jazz Studies is to foster an understanding and appreciation of the nature and significance of jazz in our society. More specifically, the Institute proposes to work toward this goal by pooling the knowledge and skills of authors and musicians, who have pioneered in the field of jazz, with those of social scientists and other experts whose techniques and studies may be brought to bear on the subject. In this manner, jazz and related subjects will be given the range and depth of scholarly study which they so richly deserve, and a vital but neglected area in American civilization will be illuminated.

Stearns negotiated transfer of IJS to Rutgers University in Newark, New Jersey, in 1966. He died before the final transfer took place. In 1967 the Institute materials were moved to the Newark campus of Rutgers University in New Jersey. Charles Nanry, a sociologist, worked part-time as its administrator. It was first located in the Dana Library (1972), then moved to Bradley Hall (1975).

The institute was formally affiliated with the John Cotton Dana Library at Rutgers in 1984. The current expanded facilities in the library opened in 1994. Over its 70 years of existence, the institute has acquired significant collections of periodicals as well as books, records, and archival materials from several musicians, photographers, and journalists. Major collections include the personal papers of Mary Lou Williams, Victoria Spivey, Abbey Lincoln, Annie Ross, Benny Carter, and James P. Johnson.

== Publications ==
A special column in The Record Changer jazz magazine was the initial, temporary place of publication for the Institute of Jazz Studies scholarship.

The Journal of Jazz Studies (JJS) was published from 1973 to 1979. Annual Review of Jazz Studies (ARJS) publication began in 1981 as a continuation of JJS. Today, the Journal of Jazz Studies is an open-access online journal. The online journal continues and expands upon the tradition of the original JJS/ARJS as the longest running English-language scholarly jazz journal. It is open-access and peer-reviewed.

Studies in Jazz, a monograph series with Scarecrow Press, publishes books related to jazz.

== Radio and scholarship ==
In addition to its publications, the institute also hosts Jazz from the Archives, a radio show on WBGO radio that airs every Sunday and a Jazz Research Roundtable.

=== Jazz Archives fellowship ===
Since 2012, the institute has also hosted an annual Jazz Archives Fellowship. The fellowship is open to graduate students of library science or recent graduates with an interest in jazz or African American studies. It is supported by the Morroe Berger–Benny Carter Jazz Research Fund, an endowment established by musician Benny Carter in 1987 to provide grants to facilitate jazz research by students and scholars. The Fellowship Program is also funded by private funds.

In 2014, the fellows focused on the collection of Ismay Duvivier, a dancer, and her son George Duvivier, a bass player.

=== Morroe Berger–Benny Carter Jazz Research Fund ===
In 1987, the institute began funding up to ten grants of $1,000 each year. The fund was started by musician Benny Carter in memory of Morroe Berger. Berger was a professor of sociology at Princeton University until his death in 1981. Half of the awards are designated for students in the Rutgers–Newark Master's Program in Jazz History and Research and half are awarded to scholars from other institutions. The awards are for visiting the Institute and performing independent jazz-related research. To date, more than 70 awards have been granted.

== Original Board of Advisers ==
- Louis Armstrong
- Philip W. Barber
- Benjamin A. Botkin
- Dave Brubeck
- Dan Burley
- Al "Jazzbo" Collins
- Harold Courlander
- Stuart Davis
- Roger Pryor Dodge
- Duke Ellington
- Ralph Ellison
- Nesuhi Ertegün
- Leonard Feather
- Norman Granz
- Bill Grauer
- Maurice R. Green, M.D.
- W. C. Handy
- Melville J. Herskovits
- George Herzog
- Langston Hughes
- Willis James
- Stan Kenton
- Lester Koenig
- M. Kolinski
- Jacob Lawrence
- Paul A. McGhee
- Alan Morrison
- Edward Abbe Niles
- Pearl Primus
- David Riesman
- Curt Sachs
- Edward Seeger
- Artie Shaw
- Edmond Souchon, M.D.
- Lorenzo Dow Turner
- Clarence Williams
- Bernard Wolfe
- John Wesley Work III

== Clement's Place ==
In 2016, the Institute of Jazz Studies opened Clement's Place, a jazz lounge open to the public in the neoclassical skyscraper at 15 Washington Street in Newark.

It is home to jazz jam sessions and listening parties. It is named for the late historian and jazz enthusiast Clement Price.

== AAPI Jazz Fest ==
The Institute presents the AAPI Jazz Fest in Newark every May at the Express Newark arts center on Halsey Street, recognizing the contributions of Asian Pacific Americans and the pan-Asian jazz community to the musical artform.

== See also ==
- James Moody Jazz Festival
- Mason Gross School of the Arts's Jazz Studies music program at Rutgers.

== Bibliography ==
- The Record Changer, July–August 1953 (special issue).
- Kerlew, Clyde, "The Institute of Jazz Studies: From Academic Orphan to National Resource," Public and Access Services Quarterly, vol. 1, no. 1, 1995, pp. 51–74.
- Wilson, John S., "Collection of Jazz Recordings and Writings Given to Rutgers," The New York Times, September 3, 1966, p. 12.
