= Frankie Newton =

American jazz trumpeter (1906–1954)

- Born: William Frank Newton; January 4, 1906; Emory, Virginia, U.S.
- Died: March 11, 1954 (aged 48) New York City, U.S.
- Genres: Jazz; Swing
- Occupations: Musician; bandleader; arranger; composer; painter; writer
- Instruments: Trumpet; valve trombone
- Years active: late 1920s – 1940s
- Labels: Victor; Vocalion; Variety; Blue Note

Frankie Newton (born William Frank Newton; January 4, 1906 – March 11, 1954) was an American jazz trumpeter from Emory, Virginia, United States. He played in several New York City bands in the 1920s and 1930s, including those led by Lloyd Scott, Charlie "Fess" Johnson, Chick Webb, Benny Carter, Sam Wooding, and Lucky Millinder.

He played in clubs in New York and Boston, with musicians such as pianist Art Tatum, pianist James P. Johnson, drummer Sid Catlett, and clarinetist Edmond Hall. He accompanied Bessie Smith on her final recordings (November 24, 1933), Maxine Sullivan on "Loch Lomond", and Billie Holiday on her original "Strange Fruit" session in 1939.

Between March 1937 and August 1939, Newton recorded eight sessions as a leader. Three sessions in 1937 were produced by Helen Oakley Dance for Irving Mills's Variety label. Five sessions were made in 1939, including a six-song session for Victor produced by Hugues Panassié, two sessions for Vocalion produced by John Henry Hammond, and two sessions for Blue Note produced by Alfred Lion.

He also played with Art Tatum on extended versions of "Sweet Georgia Brown" and "Oh, Lady Be Good!", recorded in Harlem after hours. These finally came out in 1973 as part of Tatum's album God Is in the House, first on LP and later on CD.

Politically, Newton was known to be a communist. In homage, the communist historian Eric Hobsbawm wrote jazz criticism for the New Statesman under the pen name "Francis Newton".
