= Baby, Baby, Baby (Jimmy Witherspoon album) =

Studio album by Jimmy Witherspoon
- Released: 1963
- Recorded: May 6, 1963, and July 8, 1963; New York City and Los Angeles
- Genre: Blues
- Length: 35:23
- Label: Prestige; PRLP 7290
- Producer: Ozzie Cadena and David Axelrod

Jimmy Witherspoon chronology
Roots (1962)	Baby, Baby, Baby (1963)	Evenin' Blues (1963)

Baby, Baby, Baby is an album by blues vocalist Jimmy Witherspoon which was recorded in 1963 and released on the Prestige label. The title track, "Baby Baby Baby" with music by Jerry Livingston and lyrics by Mack David, was written in 1950 but first sung by Teresa Brewer in the film Those Redheads from Seattle (1953), and then became title track of the album Baby, Baby, Baby by Mindy Carson.

== Reception ==
Professional ratings
Review scores
Source	Rating
Allmusic	3/5 stars
The Penguin Guide to Blues Recordings	2.5/4 stars

Scott Yanow of Allmusic states, "the music is enjoyable if not classic, and should please Witherspoon's many fans".

== Track listing ==
All compositions by Jimmy Witherspoon except where noted.

1. "Mean Old Frisco" (Arthur Crudup) – 3:10
2. "Rocks in My Bed" (Duke Ellington) – 2:40
3. "Bad, Bad Whiskey" (Amos Milburn) – 3:05
4. "Baby, Baby, Baby" (Mack David, Jerry Livingston) – 3:00
5. "Sail on, Little Girl, Sail On" (Amos Easton) – 2:45
6. "One Scotch, One Bourbon, One Beer" (Rudy Toombs) – 3:00
7. "Lonely Boy Blues" (Walter Brown, Jay McShann) – 2:47
8. "Blues and Trouble" – 2:52
9. "Endless Sleep" (Dolores Nance, Jody Reynolds) – 2:11
10. "I'll Go on Living" – 3:44
11. "I Can't Hardly See" – 2:39
12. "It's a Lonesome Old World" (Traditional) – 3:30

Note

- Recorded in New York City on May 6, 1963 (tracks 1–8) and in Los Angeles on July 8, 1963 (tracks 9–12)

== Personnel ==
- Jimmy Witherspoon – vocals
- Bobby Bryant – trumpet, flugelhorn (tracks 9–12)
- Leo Wright – alto saxophone, tambourine (tracks 1–8)
- Jimmy Allen – tenor saxophone (tracks 9–12)
- Arthur Wright – harmonica (tracks 9–12)
- Ernie Freeman (tracks 9–12), Gildo Mahones (tracks 1–8) – piano
- Kenny Burrell (tracks 1–8), Herman Mitchell (tracks 9–12) – guitar
- Jimmy Bond (tracks 9–12), George Tucker (tracks 1–8) – bass
- Jimmy Miller (tracks 9–12), Jimmie Smith (tracks 1–8) – drums
