= Last of the Whorehouse Piano Players (1989) =

Studio album by Ralph Sutton and Jay McShann
- Released: 1989
- Recorded: March 27 & 28, 1989
- Studio: Van Gelder, Englewood Cliffs, New Jersey
- Genre: Jazz
- Length: 60:46
- Label: Chiaroscuro; CR(D)306
- Producer: Andrew Sordoni

Ralph Sutton chronology
It's So Nice It Must Be Illegal! (1988)	Last of the Whorehouse Piano Players (1989)	Easy Street (1991)

Jay McShann chronology
Just a Lucky So and So (1984)	Last of the Whorehouse Piano Players (1989)	Paris All-Star Blues: A Tribute to Charlie Parker (1989)

Last of the Whorehouse Piano Players is an album by pianists Ralph Sutton and Jay McShann, recorded in 1989 and released by the Chiaroscuro label. The album follows the 1980 release of two LPs by Chaz Jazz entitled The Last of the Whorehouse Piano Players: Two Pianos Vol. I & Vol. II which were reissued by Chiaroscuro on CD in 1992 as Last of the Whorehouse Piano Players: The Original Sessions.

== Reception ==
Professional ratings
Review scores
Source	Rating
AllMusic	4.5/5 stars
The Penguin Guide to Jazz Recordings	3/4 stars

Scott Yanow of AllMusic stated, "Not to be confused with the CD reissue of the same name recorded in 1979, this reunion encounter by pianists Ralph Sutton and Jay McShann is up to the same level of the original dates, with plenty of heated moments ... While Sutton is the definitive stride pianist of the past half-century, McShann (who also takes a couple of vocals) finds space to infuse the music with a strong dose of blues and Kansas City swing... A seven-minute 'Jazzspeak' wraps up the enjoyable outing with some reminiscing about the session".

== Track listing ==
1. "Honey" (Seymour Simons, Haven Gillespie, Richard A. Whiting) – 4:46
2. "Old Fashioned Love" (James P. Johnson, Cecil Mack) – 6:19
3. "'Fore Day Rider" (Walter Brown, Jay McShann) – 3:06
4. "On the Sunny Side of the Street" (Jimmy McHugh, Dorothy Fields) – 5:21
5. "Sweet Georgia Brown" (Ben Bernie, Maceo Pinkard, Kenneth Casey) – 3:41
6. "Doo Wah" (McShann) – 3:49
7. "Indiana" (James F. Hanley, Ballard MacDonald) – 3:53
8. "'Deed I Do" (Fred Rose, Walter Hirsch) – 4:45
9. "Crazy Rhythm" (Irving Caesar, Joseph Meyer, Roger Wolfe Kahn) – 4:15
10. "Cherry" (Don Redman, Ray Gilbert) – 6:17
11. "Pretty Baby" (Tony Jackson, Egbert Van Alstyne, Gus Kahn) – 3:50
12. "I've Found a New Baby" (Jack Palmer, Spencer Williams) – 3:51
13. Jazzspeak – 6:53

== Personnel ==
- Ralph Sutton– piano
- Jay McShann – piano, vocals
- Milt Hinton – bass
- Gus Johnson – drums
