= Stop (Eric Burdon Band album) =

Studio album by The Eric Burdon Band
- Released: July 1975
- Recorded: 1971–1973
- Studio: Far Out Studios, San Francisco, California and Dieter Dierks Studios, Cologne Germany)
- Genre: Hard rock, R&B, jazz fusion
- Length: 36:41
- Label: Capitol
- Producer: Jerry Goldstein, John Sterling

Eric Burdon chronology
Sun Secrets (1974)	Stop (1975)	Love Is All Around (1976)

Audio sample
- "Stop": file; help

Stop is a hard rock / R&B album by the first incarnation of the Eric Burdon Band, whose line-up consisted of Burdon, John Sterling, Kim Kesterson and Terry Ryan.

The band was formed in 1971, after Burdon left his previous band War to cut an album with Jimmy Witherspoon. They recorded the 1971 album Guilty! and then, without Witherspoon, this album. Not released until July 1975, it featured no hit single, but did enjoy some American chart success, reaching both US and Canadian album charts.

The distinctive red and white gatefold sleeve, together with the plain white inner-sleeve, are die-cut octagonally in the shape of a traffic stop sign. Inside the gatefold one surface bears a large black and white portrait of Burdon, based on a photograph.

== Track listing ==
1. "City Boy" 3:50 (Burdon, John Sterling)
2. "Gotta Get it On" 2:57 (Sterling, Peter Hodgson)
3. "The Man" 2:56 (Sterling, Jay Mitthauer, Terry Ryan)
4. "I’m Lookin' Up" 2:15 (Sterling, Kim Kesterson)
5. "Rainbow" 2:39 (Burdon, Kesterson, Billy Ray Morris)
6. "All I Do" 2:08 (Burdon, Kesterson, Sterling)
7. "Funky Fever" 2:48 (Terry Ryan, Sterling)
8. "Be Mine" 8:20 (Sterling)
9. "The Way it Should Be" 3:13 (Sterling)
10. "Stop" 5:45 (Sterling, Kesterson, Robert Haney)

== Personnel ==
=== Musicians ===
- Eric Burdon – lead vocals
- Kim Kesterson, Randy Rice – bass guitar
- John Sterling, Aalon Butler – guitar
- Terry Ryan – keyboards
- Alvin Taylor, George Suranovich – drums
- Moses Wheelock, Alvin Taylor – percussion

=== Production ===
- Producer: Jerry Goldstein
- Recording engineers: Chris Huston, Dieter Dierks
- Remix engineers: Chris Huston, Ed Barton
- Album design, design concept: Thomas Warkentin, Jerry Goldstein, Bob Weiner
- Illustration (drawing): Thomas Warkentin (from photo by Jim Newport)
- Management: Steve Gold, Far Out Management Ltd

== Re-issue ==
- In 1993, Avenue Records and Rhino Entertainment packaged the album, together with Sun Secrets, in a single re-issue, but without the song "Be Mine" (8:20) from Stop.
