= Bernard Anderson (trumpeter) =

American jazz trumpeter and musician (1919–1997)

- Also known as: "Step-Buddy"
- Born: Bernard; October 14, 1919
- Died: May 10, 1997 (aged 77)
- Genres: Jazz, Hard bop
- Occupation: Musician
- Instrument: Trumpet
- Years active: 1910–1966, 1978–1997

Bernard Hartwell "Step-Buddy" Anderson (October 14, 1919 – May 10, 1997) was an American jazz trumpeter from Oklahoma City, Oklahoma. Having studied music at school under Zelia N. Breaux, Anderson was a professional musician by 1934, playing with the Ted Armstrong band in Clinton, Oklahoma. In the late 1930s he was a member of the Xavier University jazz band in New Orleans.

In 1939 Anderson returned to Oklahoma City and joined the Leslie Sheffield band that included Charlie Christian, another Zelia Breaux pupil. In 1940 he went to Kansas City and became trumpeter for the Jay McShann band, which included Charlie Parker on alto saxophone, Ben Webster on tenor saxophone, bassist Gene Ramey, drummer Gus Johnson and blues shouter Walter Brown.

Ross Russell described Anderson's style as a trumpeter, during his tenure with McShann, as having "smooth tone and legato phrasing" influenced by previous work with Charlie Christian, in Oklahoma City. Russell considered Anderson "the most advanced musician in the band after [Charlie] Parker," and described him as an innovator: "the first to play in the new, linear, semi-legato, light-toned style later made popular by Fats Navarro and Dizzy Gillespie." Later Anderson was co-leader, with Charlie Parker, of a small band that worked for several weeks at Tootie's Mayfair in Kansas City.

Shortly after joining the Billy Eckstine Orchestra in 1944, he caught tuberculosis and was medically advised to abandon the trumpet. He played his own unique style of piano after putting down the trumpet.

In 1978, Anderson was encouraged by a group of friends and medical students from Kansas City College of Osteopathic Medicine, to pick the trumpet up again. He began playing and eventually performed with many local Kansas City artists, including Ernie Williams and Brian Morahan. Brian took him to NYC in 1979-80 and back to KC where he resumed life with his wife Jackie a bassist.
