= Spoon in London =

Studio album by Jimmy Witherspoon
- Released: 1965
- Recorded: June 1965; London, England
- Genre: Blues
- Label: Prestige; PRLP 7418
- Producer: Lew Futterman

Jimmy Witherspoon chronology
Some of My Best Friends Are the Blues (1965)	Spoon in London (1965)	Blues for Easy Livers (1966)

Spoon in London is an album by blues vocalist Jimmy Witherspoon which was recorded in England in 1965 and released on the Prestige label.

== Reception ==
Professional ratings
Review scores
Source	Rating
Allmusic	3/5 stars

Richie Unterberger of Allmusic states, "Spoon in London is an uncharacteristic entry in the Witherspoon catalog. Recorded in London in June 1965, there's a definite soul-pop slant to the production, with backup women singers that wouldn't have been out of place at a Ray Charles session; brassy, bright arrangements; and lean blues-rock guitar backup... there's a definite sense of trying to cross Witherspoon's habitual classy soul-jazz over into the soul and rock markets. Purists, of course, will probably be offended, but, in fact, this deviation from the usual format makes this one of Witherspoon's more interesting and, yes, fun releases".

== Track listing ==
1. "Love Me Right" (Cherry Foster, Walter Jessup) – 2:23
2. "Make This Heart of Mine Smile Again" (David Parker, Kelly Owens) – 2:16
3. "Oh How I Love You" (Windsor King) – 3:16
4. "Free Spirits" (Norman Mapp) – 2:40
5. "I Never Thought I'd See the Day" (Bob Rosenblum) – 2:19
6. "Man Don't Cry" (A. White) – 2:09
7. "Darlin' I Thank You" (King) – 2:14
8. "A Million More Tomorrows" (Rosenblum) – 2:34
9. "Don't Come Back to Me (For Sympathy)" (Maurice "Bugs" Bower, Jack Wolf) – 2:01
10. "Come On and Walk With Me" (Betts) – 2:36
11. "Room for Everybody" (Lil Green) – 2:48
12. "Two Hearts Are Better Than One" (Edward Marshall) – 2:31

== Personnel ==
- Jimmy Witherspoon – vocals
- The Ladybirds – chorus
- Unidentified orchestra arranged and conducted by Benny Golson
