= Sun Secrets =

Studio album by The Eric Burdon Band
- Released: December 1974
- Recorded: 1973
- Studio: Record Plant (Sausalito)
- Genre: Hard rock, psychedelic rock
- Length: 47:30
- Label: Capitol
- Producer: Jerry Goldstein

Eric Burdon chronology
| Guilty (1971) | Sun Secrets (1974) | Stop (1975) |

Professional ratings
Review scores
| Source | Rating |
|---|---|
| The Village Voice | C |
| AllMusic | 2/5 stars |

Sun Secrets is the first album by the Eric Burdon Band recorded in 1973 and released in December 1974.

It includes some re-recording of songs, with which lead singer Eric Burdon topped the charts a few years before. The band included Aalon Butler on guitar, Randy Rice on bass and Alvin Taylor on drums.

"The Real Me", "Ring of Fire" and "Don't Let Me Be Misunderstood" were released as singles. The album peaked at No. 51 on the Billboard 200 chart in 1975.

They formed in 1971, after Burdon left his previous band War to cut an album with blues/jazz-great Jimmy Witherspoon. They recorded the album Guilty and then, without Witherspoon, the album Stop.

== Track listing ==
1. "It’s My Life" 4:43 (Roger Atkins, Carl D’Errico)
2. "Ring of Fire" 6:11 (June Carter, Merle Kilgore)
3. "Medley: When I Was Young / War Child" 8:30 (Burdon, Aalon Butler)
4. "The Real Me" 3:34 (Burdon, Butler)
5. "Medley:Don’t Let Me Be Misunderstood / Nina’s School" 8:25 (Bennie Benjamin, Sol Marcus, Gloria Caldwell, Burdon, Butler)
6. "Letter from the County Farm" 13:05 (Burdon, Rosco Gordon)
7. "Sun Secrets" 3:02 (Butler)

== Personnel ==
- Eric Burdon - vocals
- Aalon Butler - guitar
- Randy Rice - bass
- Alvin Taylor - drums
- Ed Barton - engineer
- Norman Seeff - photography

== Re-issues ==
- In 1993, Avenue Records and Rhino Entertainment combined the albums Sun Secrets and Stop though, due to length, the song "Be Mine" (8:10, from Stop) is not included on the compilation.
- Available on quadrophonic 8-track cartridge in 1974 Q8W-11359 on Capitol.
