= Last of the Whorehouse Piano Players (1980) =

Studio album by Ralph Sutton and Jay McShann
- Released: 1992
- Recorded: December 15 & 16, 1979
- Studio: Premier Sound, New York City
- Genre: Jazz
- Length: 69:59
- Label: Chiaroscuro; CR(D)206
- Producer: Charles Baron

Ralph Sutton chronology
Together Again! (1977)	Last of the Whorehouse Piano Players (1992)	Ralph Sutton & Kenny Davern (1980)

Jay McShann chronology
The Big Apple Bash (1979)	Last of the Whorehouse Piano Players (1980)	Tuxedo Junction (1980)

Two Pianos Vol. I Cover

Two Pianos Vol. II Cover

Last of the Whorehouse Piano Players, subtitled The Original Sessions is an album by pianists Ralph Sutton and Jay McShann, recorded in 1979 and originally released by the Chaz Jazz label as two LPs (subtitled Two Pianos Vol. I & II) before being reissued with two additional unreleased tracks by the Chiaroscuro label in 1992. The 1992 CD reissue omitted two tracks from Two Pianos Vol. II, "I'll Catch The Sun" which was a solo feature for Jay McShann and "Ain't Misbehavin'" which Ralph Sutton played solo. Another CD of 1989 recordings by the same group with the same title was released by Chiaroscuro on CD as Last of the Whorehouse Piano Players.

== Reception ==
Professional ratings
Review scores
Source	Rating
AllMusic	4/5 stars
The Penguin Guide to Jazz Recordings	3/4 stars

In Sutton's obituary, The Guardian's Peter Vacher noted, "In 1979, in an inspired move, he teamed up with keyboard veteran Jay McShann as The Last of the Whorehouse Piano Players, the two men producing some of the most rumbustious and lively music on the planet".

== Track listing ==
1. "Little Rock Getaway" (Joe Sullivan) – 5:08 Originally released on Two Pianos Vol. I
2. "Am I Blue?" (Harry Akst, Grant Clarke) – 6:33 Originally released on Two Pianos Vol. I
3. "All of Me" (Gerald Marks, Seymour Simons) – 4:26 Originally released on Two Pianos Vol. I
4. "Honky Tonk Train Blues" (Meade "Lux" Lewis) – 4:30 Originally released on Two Pianos Vol. I
5. "Rosetta" (Earl Hines, Henri Woode) – 4:43 Originally released on Two Pianos Vol. I
6. "St. Louis Blues" (W. C. Handy) – 5:12 Originally released on Two Pianos Vol. I
7. "Please Don't Talk About Me When I'm Gone" (Sam H. Stept, Sidney Clare) – 4:25 Originally released on Two Pianos Vol. I
8. "Girl of My Dreams" (Sunny Clapp) – 6:00 Originally released on Two Pianos Vol. II
9. "I Got Rhythm" (George Gershwin, Ira Gershwin) – 4:50 Originally released on Two Pianos Vol. II
10. "Dog Ass Blues" (Jay McShann, Ralph Sutton) – 5:16 Originally released on Two Pianos Vol. II
11. "Hootie's Ignorant Oil" (McShann, Walter Brown) – 2:19 Originally released on Two Pianos Vol. II
12. "Truckin'" (Rube Bloom, Ted Koehler) – 3:12 Originally released on Two Pianos Vol. II
13. "After You've Gone" (Turner Layton, Henry Creamer) – 5:34 Originally released on Two Pianos Vol. II
14. "I Ain't Got Nobody" (Spencer Williams, Roger Graham, Dave Peyton) – 3:40 Previously unreleased
15. "Variations on a Weeping Willow" (McShann, Sutton) – 4:11 Previously unreleased

== Personnel ==
- Ralph Sutton– piano, vocals
- Jay McShann – piano, vocals
- Milt Hinton – bass
- Gus Johnson – drums
