= The Last of the Blue Devils (album) =

Studio album by Jay McShann
- Released: March 1978
- Recorded: June 29 & 30 and July 1, 1977
- Studio: RCA Recording Studios, Studio B, New York, NY
- Genre: Jazz
- Length: 46:36
- Label: Atlantic; SD 8800
- Producer: İlhan Mimaroğlu

Jay McShann chronology
After Hours (1977)	The Last of the Blue Devils (1978)	A Tribute to Fats Waller (1978)

The Last of the Blue Devils is an album by jazz pianist Jay McShann, recorded in 1977 and released by the Atlantic label.

== Reception ==
Professional ratings
Review scores
Source	Rating
AllMusic	4/5 stars
The Penguin Guide to Jazz Recordings	3.5/4 stars

The Globe and Mail wrote that "a sextet is his backup, a stripped-down band which is perfect both for pushing through an old swing number like 'Jumpin' at the Woodside' to make it live again and adding the proper burlesque touch to his vocal ''Tain't Nobody's Bizness If I Do'."

The AllMusic review by Rick Anderson noted: "McShann had much more to offer the world than his role as caregiver to the inventor of bebop. Leading an all-star cast ... McShann teaches an entire course on the history of blues-based jazz... Highly recommended".

== Track listing ==
1. "Confessin' the Blues" (Jay McShann, Walter Brown) – 4:43
2. "'Tain't Nobody's Bizness If I Do" (Everett Robbins, Porter Grainger) – 6:59
3. "Hootie Blues" (Charlie Parker, McShann, Brown) – 4:29
4. "Blue Devil Jump" (Paul Quinichette) – 3:25
5. "My Chile" (McShann) – 4:15
6. "Jumpin' at the Woodside" (Count Basie, John Hendricks) – 4:36
7. "Just for You" (Pete Johnson, Herman Walder, Leo Corday, Booker Washington) – 5:37
8. "Hot Biscuits" (McShann) – 3:25
9. "'Fore Day Rider" (McShann, Brown) – 4:08
10. "Kansas City" (Jerry Leiber, Mike Stoller) – 4:51

== Personnel ==
- Jay McShann – piano, electric piano, vocals
- Joe Newman – trumpet (tracks 1–6 & 8–10)
- Paul Quinichette, Buddy Tate – tenor saxophone (tracks 1–6 & 8–10)
- John Scofield – electric guitar (tracks 1–6 & 8–10)
- Milt Hinton – bass (tracks 1–6 & 8–10)
- Jackie Williams – drums (tracks 1–6 & 8–10)
