= Chuck Norris (musician) =

American blues guitarist

- Born: Charles Eldridge Norris; August 11, 1921; Kansas City, Missouri, U.S.
- Died: August 26, 1989 (aged 68); Tustin, California, U.S.
- Occupation: Guitarist

Charles Eldridge Norris (August 11, 1921 – August 26, 1989) was an American jazz and blues guitarist.

== Biography ==
Norris was born in Kansas City, Missouri, and raised in Chicago, where he was tutored in music composition and performance by Walter Dyett. He moved to Los Angeles in the mid-1940s, played in nightclubs, and developed a reputation as a session musician in Hollywood. He released some recordings under his own name in the late 1940s and early 1950s. He also accompanied the singers Percy Mayfield and Floyd Dixon and for some time played in the Johnny Otis Orchestra. He also worked with such performers as Amos Milburn, Dinah Washington, and Little Richard. In 1980, he recorded a live album, The Los Angeles Flash, in Gothenburg, Sweden.

Norris died in Tustin, California, in 1989.

== Tribute ==
The Swedish rock band The Chuck Norris Experiment claim to have taken their name from the guitarist, who recorded The Los Angeles Flash in their home city of Gothenburg, rather than from the actor of the same name, with whom the musician is sometimes confused.

== Discography ==
As leader

- "Money's Getting Cheaper" / "No Better For Me" (Coast 8044, 1947)
- "The Golden Rule" / "I Ain't Gonna Stick Around" (Imperial 5044, 1949)
- "I Love You Baby Blues" / "Somebody Else" (Imperial 5049, 1949)
- "Chicken Neck" / "Oh, Little Girl" (Selective 119, May 1950)
- "What's Good For One's Good For All" / "Hey Everybody" (Mercury 8215, Feb 1951)
- "Rockin' After Hours" / "I Know The Blues" (Aladdin 3081, Mar 1951)
- "Kinda Sick, Kinda Worried" / "Let's Get A Little Taste" (Mercury 8221, May 1951)
- "Messin' Up" / "Let Me Know" (Atlantic 994, May 1953)
- The Los Angeles Flash (Stockholm Records RJ-201, Jun 1980 [1982])

With Jay McShann

- McShann's Piano (Capitol, Aug 1966 [1967])
