= McShann's Piano =

Studio album by Jay McShann
- Released: 1967
- Recorded: August 1966
- Studio: Capitol (Hollywood)
- Genre: Jazz
- Length: 34:40
- Label: Capitol; ST/T 2645
- Producer: Dave Dexter Jr.

Jay McShann chronology
Goin' to Kansas City Blues (1957)	McShann's Piano (1967)	Confessin the Blues (1970)

McShann's Piano is an album by jazz pianist Jay McShann, recorded in 1966 and released by the Capitol label.

== Reception ==
Professional ratings
Review scores
Source	Rating
AllMusic	4/5 stars

The AllMusic review by Scott Yanow noted, "Jay McShann's first recording in a decade (and first official full-length LP) is a fine showcase for the pianist, who takes vocals on three of the 11 selections. ... Throughout, McShann's blend of swing, stride, boogie and blues is quite appealing". In JazzTimes, Stanley Dance observed, "McShann’s Piano, had wide circulation and served to introduce McShann as the singer he necessarily became in order to answer requests for the unforgotten hits with Walter Brown. He has a similar regional accent and vocal quality, but he sings much better than Brown, with more attention to melodic variety and more warmth and humor".

== Track listing ==
All compositions by Jay McShann except where noted

1. "Vine Street Boogie" – 4:30
2. "The Staggers" (Bobby Black) – 3:00
3. "Yardbird Waltz" – 2:28
4. "My Chile" – 3:36
5. "Confessin' the Blues" (Jay McShann, Walter Brown) – 2:14
6. "Moten Swing" (Bennie Moten, Buster Moten) – 2:55
7. "The Man from Muskogee" – 4:18
8. "Blues for an Old Cat" (Black) – 2:36
9. "I Ain't Mad at You" (Jesse Price, Bob Sparkler) – 3:07
10. "Doo Wah Doo" (McShann, W. R. Dixon) – 2:36
11. "Dexter Blues" (McShann, Willie Scott) – 3:20

== Personnel ==
- Jay McShann – piano, vocals
- Chuck Norris – electric guitar
- Ralph Hamilton – electric bass
- Paul Gunther / Jesse Price – drums
