= Jesse Price (musician) =

American jazz musician (1909–1974)

Jesse Price (May 1, 1909, Memphis, Tennessee – April 19, 1974, Los Angeles) was an American jazz drummer.

Price began on drums at age 14, and played locally with blues singers, including Ida Cox, and in the Palace Theater pit orchestra, early in his career. He moved to Kansas City in 1934, where he played with George E. Lee, Thamon Hayes, Count Basie (1936), and Harlan Leonard (1939–41). He then moved to Los Angeles, where he worked with Ella Fitzgerald, Louis Armstrong (1943), Stan Kenton (1944), Basie again (1944), Benny Carter, and Slim Gaillard (1949). He recorded with Jay McShann when back in Kansas City again in the 1950s. He led a band at the Monterey Jazz Festival in 1971, which included Harry Edison, Jimmy Forrest and Big Joe Turner.

Price recorded 23 tracks as a leader between 1946 and 1948, most of them for Capitol Records. All are published on a Blue Moon CD: The Singing Drummer Man; Jesse Price. The Complete Recordings 1946–1957 (BMCD 6019).

== Discography ==
=== As sideman ===
With B.B. King

- 1956: Singin' the Blues (Crown)

With Jay McShann

- McShann's Piano (Capitol, 1967)
