= Ian Bargh =

Canadian jazz pianist

- Born: Ian Martin Bargh; 8 January 1935; Prestwick, Scotland, United Kingdom
- Died: 2 January 2012 (aged 76) Toronto, Ontario, Canada
- Genres: Jazz
- Occupations: Musician, composer
- Instrument: Piano
- Years active: 1953–2011
- Labels: Sackville, Cornerstone

Ian Martin Bargh (8 January 1935 – 2 January 2012) was a Scottish born Canadian jazz pianist and composer.

== Early life ==
Born in Prestwick, Scotland, Bargh established himself by the age of 17 as a classical pianist that played with jazz ensembles in the U.K. He emigrated to Toronto in 1957 and continued a musical career that spanned six decades.

== Career ==
Bargh quickly established himself as a featured pianist and sideman for touring musicians stopping to perform in Toronto, playing in such legendary establishments as George's Spaghetti House. Through the 1960s and 1970s, some of the many jazz greats he played with were, Buddy Tate, Buck Clayton, Bobby Hackett, Vic Dickenson, Eddie "Cleanhead" Vinson, Ernestine Anderson, Harry "Sweets" Edison, Edmond Hall, Doc Cheatham, and Tyree Glenn.

In the 1980s, he began an eight-year association with Jim Galloway's "Toronto Alive" project at the Sheraton Centre. Live collaborations at the centre included those with, Zoot Sims, Al Cohn, Lee Konitz, Peter Appleyard, Frank Wright, Scott Hamilton, Rob McConnell, Guido Basso, Ed Bickert, Dizzy Reece, and Warren Vache, among others.

During this period, he also toured in jazz festivals across the world in an all-star group again led by Galloway. He was also featured at the Bern International Jazz Festival as part of an impressive roster that included fellow pianists Chick Corea, Count Basie and Dave Brubeck.

Towards the end of this period, he began a fifteen-year association with the Toronto Jazz Festival, leading the rhythm section of the host hotel's house band. It was at this venue that he performed with scores of musicians, including, Plas Johnson, Spanky Davis, Harold Ashby, both Warren and Allan Vache, Fraser MacPherson, Joe Temperley, Randy Sandke, Jake Hanna, and George Masso.

== Recordings ==
Bargh performed as a sideman for many Toronto-based recordings, many of them on the Sackville Records label, which also released his solo album "Only Trust Your Heart", which received an enthusiastic review by AllMusic jazz critic Dave Nathan.

== Discography ==
- Only Trust Your Heart (Sackville, 2000)

=== As sideman ===
- At the Bern Jazz Festival – Doc Cheatham (Sackville, 1994)
- Echoes of Swing – Jim Galloway (Cornerstone, 2003)
- Diano Who? – Diana Drew (Jocosity, 2003)
