= Goin' to Kansas City Blues =

Studio album by Jimmy Witherspoon with Jay McShann and His Band
- Released: 1958
- Recorded: December 4 & 5, 1957
- Studio: RCA's 24th Street Studios, NYC
- Genre: Jazz
- Length: 44:56 CD reissue with additional track
- Label: RCA Victor; LPM 1639
- Producer: Brad McCuen

Jimmy Witherspoon chronology
New Orleans Blues (1957)	Goin' to Kansas City Blues (1958)	Feelin' the Spirit (1959)

Jay McShann chronology
Kansas City Memories (1954)	Goin' to Kansas City Blues (1958)	McShann's Piano (1967)

Goin' to Kansas City Blues is an album by vocalist Jimmy Witherspoon with pianist Jay McShann and His Band, recorded in 1957 and released by the RCA Victor label.

== Reception ==
Professional ratings
Review scores
Source	Rating
AllMusic	4/5 stars

Richie Unterberger of AllMusic stated, "A reunion of sorts with McShann, with whom Witherspoon had sung for four years in the late '40s. A relaxed, swinging set that bisects jazz and blues, it holds no great surprises, but 'Spoon fans will find this an enjoyable and accomplished record".

== Track listing ==
1. "The Jumpin' Blues" (Jay McShann, Charlie Parker) – 3:03
2. "Until the Real Thing Comes Along" (Sammy Cahn, Saul Chaplin, L.E. Freeman, Mann Holiner, Alberta Nichols) – 2:47
3. "Hootie Blues" (McShann, Parker) – 3:20
4. "Rain Is Such a Lonesome Sound" (Jimmy Witherspoon) – 3:16
5. "Confessin' the Blues" (McShann, Walter Brown) – 4:15
6. "Piney Brown Blues" (Pete Johnson, Big Joe Turner) – 5:29
7. "Froggy Bottom" (John T. Williams) – 2:36
8. "Gee, Baby, Ain't I Good to You" (Don Redman, Andy Razaf) – 3:17
9. "Blue Monday" (Witherspoon) – 3:40
10. "Ooh Wee, Then the Lights Go Out" (Willie Dixon) – 2:55
11. "Cloudy" (Mary Lou Williams) – 3:14 Additional track on CD reissue
12. "Fare Thee Honey, Fare Thee Well" (J. Mayo Williams, John Akers) – 3:30 Additional track on CD reissue
13. "Ride On" (Skeets Tolbert) – 3:30 Additional track on CD reissue

== Personnel ==
- Jimmy Witherspoon – vocals
- Jay McShann – piano
- Emmett Berry (tracks 2, 4, 7, 8 & 10–13), Ray Copeland (tracks 1, 3, 5, 6 & 9) – trumpet
- J. C. Higginbotham – trombone
- Hilton Jefferson – alto saxophone
- Seldon Powell – tenor saxophone
- Haywood Henry (tracks 1, 3, 5, 6 & 9), Al Sears (tracks 2, 4, 7, 8 & 10–13) – baritone saxophone
- Kenny Burrell – guitar
- Gene Ramey – bass
- Mousey Alexander – drums
- Budd Johnson – arranger
