= Over the Rainbow (New York Unit album) =

Studio album by New York Unit
- Released: 1993
- Recorded: June 15, 1992
- Studio: Sear Sound, New York City
- Genre: Jazz
- Length: 58:30
- Label: Paddle Wheel; KICJ 136
- Producer: New York Unit, Noichi Nakao

John Hicks chronology
Crazy for You (1992)	Over the Rainbow (1992)	Single Petal of a Rose (1992)

New York Unit chronology
Now's the Time (1992)	Over the Rainbow (1992)	Akari (1994)

Naima Cover

Over the Rainbow is an album by New York Unit, consisting of tenor saxophonist Pharoah Sanders, pianist John Hicks, bassist Richard Davis, and drummer Tatsuya Nakamura which was recorded in 1992 and initially released in Japan. It was also released with the title Naima on Evidence in 1995.

== Recording and music ==
The album was recorded at Sear Sound in New York City, on June 15, 1992. The material is standards, with the addition of the John Coltrane composition "Naima".

== Release ==
Over the Rainbow was released by Paddle Wheel Records in Japan. It was also released by Evidence under the title Naima.

== Reception ==
Professional ratings
Review scores
Source	Rating
AllMusic	3/5 stars
The Penguin Guide to Jazz	3.5/4 stars

The AllMusic review by Al Campbell stated: "This is simply a beautiful, laid-back, straight-ahead jazz date". The reviewer for The Skanner commented: "Sanders, a Coltrane protege, is enjoying a rebirth of popularity which is richly deserved. He is playing wonderfully well with evidence of a Coltrane influence but with his own sound." The authors of The Penguin Guide to Jazz Recordings wrote: "Recommended, provided you've banished any expectation of saxophone excess."

== Track listing ==
1. "Greensleeves" (Traditional) – 5:47
2. "Naima" (John Coltrane) – 8:51
3. "Summertime" (George Gershwin, DuBose Heyward) – 5:57
4. "Stormy Monday Blues" (T-Bone Walker) – 8:59
5. "I've Never Been in Love Before" (Frank Loesser) – 7:51
6. "Skylark" (Hoagy Carmichael, Johnny Mercer) – 3:44
7. "Mara" (Richard Davis) – 10:24
8. "Over the Rainbow" (Harold Arlen, Yip Harburg) – 7:02

== Personnel ==
- Pharoah Sanders – tenor sax (tracks 1–3, 7, 8)
- John Hicks – piano
- Richard Davis – bass (tracks 1–7)
- Tatsuya Nakamura – drums (tracks 1–5, 7)
