= Jim Galloway =

Scottish jazz clarinetist and saxophonist (1936–2014)

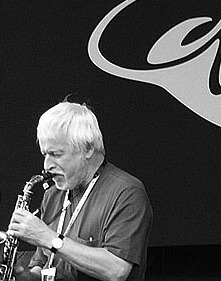

Background information
- Born: James Braidie Galloway; 28 July 1936; Kilwinning, Ayrshire, Scotland
- Died: 30 December 2014 (aged 78) Toronto, Ontario, Canada
- Genre: Jazz
- Occupation: Musician
- Instruments: Saxophone, clarinet
- Years active: 1960s–2014

James Braidie Galloway (28 July 1936 – 30 December 2014) was a jazz clarinet and saxophone player. He based his career in Canada after emigrating from Scotland in the mid-1960s.

== Early life and education ==
Galloway was born in Kilwinning, Ayrshire, Scotland. He studied graphic design at the Glasgow School of Fine Arts. He also studied clarinet and alto saxophone, and began playing in local Glasgow venues.

== Career ==
Galloway moved to Toronto in 1964. He worked briefly as a graphic designer, and played in local bands, including the Metro Stompers. He went on tour in Europe and the United States with Buddy Tate in the mid-1970s, and soon after formed the Wee Big Band.

Galloway recorded many jazz albums, both with his own band and in collaboration with other well-known jazz musicians. His album Walking on Air was nominated for Best Jazz Album at the Juno Awards of 1980.

He was a co-founder of the Toronto Jazz Festival, and served as its music director from 1987 to 2009. In 2002 he was made a Chevalier of the French Ordre des Arts et des Lettres.

Galloway died in palliative care in Toronto on 30 December 2014. A documentary film about his life, Jim Galloway: A Journey in Jazz, was aired on TV Ontario in 2018.

== Discography ==
- Bojangles (1978/79)
- Thou Swell (1981, with Jay McShann, Don Thompson and Terry Clarke),
- At The Bern Jazz Festival (1983) (with Doc Cheatham, Ian Bargh)
- The Sackville All Stars Christmas Record (1986) (with Ralph Sutton)
- A Tribute To Louis Armstrong (1988) (with Ralph Sutton)
- Jim & Jay's Christmas (1992) (with Jay McShann)
- Wee Big Band (1993)
- Live at the Green Dolphin - Cape Town, South Africa (Vol. 1 & 2) (1996)
- Pocketful of Dreams (1997) (with Ralph Sutton)
- What's New (1997) (with Bob Barnard and Henri Chaix)
- At the Ball (1998) (with Ed Polcer)
- Raisin' the Roof (1998) (with Allan Vaché)
- Music Is My Life (2001) (with Dick Wellstood and Humphrey Lyttelton)
- Live in Toronto (2010) (with Vic Dickenson - recorded 1973)
