= Evenin' Blues =

Studio album by Jimmy Witherspoon
- Released: March 1964
- Recorded: August 15, 1963; Los Angeles, California
- Genre: Blues
- Length: 39:25
- Label: Prestige; PRLP 7300
- Producer: David Axelrod

Jimmy Witherspoon chronology
Baby, Baby, Baby (1963)	Evenin' Blues (1964)	Blues Around the Clock (1963)

Evenin' Blues is a studio album by blues vocalist Jimmy Witherspoon, recorded in 1963 and released on the Prestige label in March 1964.

== Reception ==
Professional ratings
Review scores
Source	Rating
AllMusic	4/5 stars
The Penguin Guide to Blues Recordings	3.5/4 stars

AllMusic called the album "a good, relaxed (but not laid-back) session, and one of his bluesier ones".

== Track listing ==
All compositions by Jimmy Witherspoon except where noted.

1. "Money's Gettin' Cheaper" – 2:49
2. "Grab Me a Freight" (Larraine Walton) – 3:45
3. "Don't Let Go" (Jesse Stone) – 2:49
4. "I've Been Treated Wrong" (Robert Brown) – 3:27
5. "Evenin'" (Royce Swain) – 2:42
6. "Cane River" – 2:33
7. "Baby, How Long" (Brownie McGhee) – 2:48
8. "Good Rockin' Tonight" (Roy Brown) – 2:43
9. "Kansas City" (Jerry Leiber, Mike Stoller) – 3:05
10. "Drinkin' Beer" – 2:15
11. "Don't Let Go" [alternate take] (Stone) – 2:41 Bonus track on CD reissue
12. "I've Been Treated Wrong" [alternate take] (Brown) – 3:18 Bonus track on CD reissue
13. "Evenin'" [alternate take] (Swain) – 2:42 Bonus track on CD reissue
14. "Cane River" [alternate take] – 2:31 Bonus track on CD reissue

== Personnel ==
- Jimmy Witherspoon – vocals
- Clifford Scott – tenor saxophone, alto saxophone, flute
- Bert Kendrix – piano, organ
- T-Bone Walker – guitar
- Clarence Jones – bass
- Wayne Robertson – drums
