= After the Morning (1992 John Hicks album) =

Live album by John Hicks
- Released: 1997
- Recorded: July 8, 1992
- Venue: Montreal International Jazz Festival, Montreal, Canada
- Genre: Jazz
- Length: 71:34
- Label: Dominic Sciscente Music

John Hicks chronology
Single Petal of a Rose (1992)	After the Morning (1992)	The Missouri Connection (1992)

After the Morning is a solo piano album by John Hicks. It was recorded in concert at the 1992 Montreal International Jazz Festival.

== Recording and Music ==
This solo piano album by John Hicks was recorded in concert at the Montreal International Jazz Festival on July 8, 1992.

== Release and reception ==
Professional ratings
Review scores
Source	Rating
The Penguin Guide to Jazz	3/4 stars

After the Morning was released by the Canadian label Dominic Sciscente Music. The Penguin Guide to Jazz identified the shorter pieces as highlights – "often little more than a theme statement and a brief, cadenza-like solo." (Note: This source reviews the album under a heading that gives the recording and release information of a 1979 album with the same title, but the review is largely of the 1992 recording.) The reviewers described the piano sound as "respectable for the time, but a bit cavernous."

== Track listing ==
All compositions by John Hicks except where noted

1. "That Ole Devil Called Love" (Allan Roberts, Doris Fisher) – 4:41
2. "A Flower Is a Lovesome Thing/Chelsea Bridge" (Billy Strayhorn) – 10:02
3. "Mt. Royal Blues" – 4:52
4. "Embraceable You" (George Gershwin, Ira Gershwin) – 6:13
5. "Monk's Mood/Reflections/Ruby, My Dear" (Thelonious Monk) – 8:54
6. "After the Morning" – 6:19
7. "Meditation" (Antônio Carlos Jobim, Newton Mendonça, Norman Gimbel) – 7:25
8. "Oblivion" (Bud Powell) – 3:45
9. "Moment to Moment/Never Let Me Go" (Henry Mancini, Johnny Mercer/Jay Livingston, Ray Evans) – 6:53
10. "Some Other Spring/Some Other Time" (Arthur Herzog, Jr., Irene Kitchings/Hicks) – 5:17
11. "Moment's Notice" (John Coltrane) – 3:03
12. "Midwest Blues (Blues on the River)" – 4:10

== Personnel ==
- John Hicks – piano
