= Friends Old and New =

Studio album by John Hicks
- Released: 1992
- Recorded: January 14, 1992
- Studio: BMG Studios, New York City
- Genre: Jazz
- Length: 51:07
- Label: Novus; 63141-2
- Producer: Bob Thiele

John Hicks chronology
Tribute to George Adams (1991–92)	Friends Old and New (1992)	Now's the Time (1992)

Friends Old and New is an album led by pianist John Hicks, recorded in 1992.

== Recording and release ==
The album was recorded at BMG Studios in New York City on January 14, 1992. It was produced by Bob Thiele. The musicians were pianist John Hicks, trumpeters Greg Gisbert and Clark Terry, trombonist Al Grey, tenor saxophonist Joshua Redman, bassist Ron Carter, and drummer Grady Tate. "I Want to Talk About You" is a trio track.

Friends Old and New was released by Novus Records.

== Reception ==
Professional ratings
Review scores
Source	Rating
Allmusic	4.5/5 stars

On Allmusic, Ron Wynn observed "pianist John Hicks playing in various combo settings with some excellent musical associates ... for some powerhouse numbers".

== Track listing ==
1. "Hicks Tone" (John Hicks) – 7:52
2. "I Want to Talk About You" (Billy Eckstine) – 5:56
3. "Bop Scotch" (Glenn Osser, Bob Thiele) – 4:58
4. "True Blue" (Osser, Thiele) – 6:34
5. "It Don't Mean a Thing (If It Ain't Got That Swing)" (Duke Ellington, Irving Mills) – 6:43
6. "Nutty" (Thelonious Monk) – 7:30
7. "Makin' Whoopee" (Walter Donaldson, Gus Kahn) – 6:26
8. "Rosetta" (Earl Hines, Henri Woode) – 5:08

== Personnel ==
- Greg Gisbert – trumpet
- Clark Terry – trumpet
- Al Grey – trombone
- Joshua Redman – tenor sax
- John Hicks – piano
- Ron Carter – bass
- Grady Tate – drums
