= After Hours (Jay McShann album) =

Studio album by Jay McShann
- Released: 1982
- Recorded: April 12, 1977
- Studios: Copenhagen, Denmark
- Genre: Jazz
- Length: 37:03
- Labels: Storyville; SLP 4024
- Producer: Walther Klæbel

Jay McShann chronology
Kansas City On My Mind (1977)	After Hours (1982)	The Last of the Blue Devils (1978)

After Hours is an album by jazz pianist Jay McShann, recorded in 1977 but not released by the Storyville label until 1982.

== Reception ==
Professional ratings
Review scores
Source	Rating
AllMusic	3/5 stars
The Penguin Guide to Jazz Recordings	2.5/4 stars

The AllMusic review by Scott Yanow noted: "Other than the opening 'Doo-Wah-Doo' and the closing 'Cherry Red', both of which include guitarist Thomas Muller, bassist Ole Skipper Mosgard and drummer Thorkild Moller, this is a set of unaccompanied piano and vocals by the great veteran Jay McShann. The music is typical for McShann, with veteran blues (such as 'After Hours' and 'How Long Blues'), the standard 'Ace in the Hole', and some swinging boogie-based originals".

== Track listing ==
All compositions by Jay McShann except where noted

1. "Doo-Wah-Doo" – 3:44
2. "After Hours" (Avery Parrish) – 4:52
3. "How Long Blues" (Leroy Carr) – 3:32
4. "The Man from Muskogee" – 3:45
5. "Yardbird Waltz" – 3:16
6. "Kansas City Blues" (Little Willie Littlefield) – 3:48
7. "The Staggers" – 3:08
8. "Ace in the Hole" (James Dempsey, George Mitchell) – 3:32
9. "Vognporten Boogie" – 4:02
10. "Cherry Red" (Pete Johnson, Big Joe Turner) – 3:24

== Personnel ==
- Jay McShann – piano, vocals
- Ole Skipper Mosgård – bass (tracks 1 & 10)
- Thomas Puggaard-Müller – electric guitar (tracks 1 & 10)
- Thorkild Møller – drums (tracks 1 & 10)
