= Some of My Best Friends Are the Blues =

Studio album by Jimmy Witherspoon
- Released: 1964
- Recorded: July 15–20, 1964; Stockholm, Sweden
- Genre: Blues
- Length: 33:33
- Label: Prestige; PRLP 7356
- Producer: Lew Futterman

Jimmy Witherspoon chronology
Blue Spoon (1964)	Some of My Best Friends Are the Blues (1964)	Blues for Easy Livers (1965)

Some of My Best Friends Are the Blues is an album by blues vocalist Jimmy Witherspoon which was recorded in Sweden in 1964 and released on the Prestige label.

== Reception ==
Professional ratings
Review scores
Source	Rating
AllMusic	3/5 stars
The Penguin Guide to Blues Recordings	2/4 stars
Record Mirror	3/5 stars

Scott Yanow, writing for AllMusic, stated: "Nothing all that memorable occurs, but the singer is in strong voice, and his fans will want to pick up this".

== Track listing ==
1. "Some of My Best Friends Are the Blues" (Al Byron, Woody Harris) – 2:55
2. "Everytime I Think About You" (Claude Demetrius) – 2:39
3. "I Never Will Marry" (Traditional) – 2:48
4. "I Wanna Be Around" (Johnny Mercer, Sadie Vimmerstedt) – 3:27
5. "Teardrops from My Eyes" (Rudy Toombs) – 2:59
6. "And the Angels Sing" (Ziggy Elman, Johnny Mercer) – 2:55
7. "Who's Sorry Now?" (Bert Kalmar, Harry Ruby, Ted Snyder) – 3:37
8. "I'm Comin Down With the Blues" (Don Covay) – 2:23
9. "You're Next" (Sid Tepper) – 2:16
10. "Happy Blues" (Tony Bruno) – 2:14
11. "That's Why I'm Leaving" (Lockie Edwards, Jr.) – 2:32
12. "One Last Chance" (Jimmy Witherspoon) – 3:12

== Personnel ==
- Jimmy Witherspoon – vocals
- Benny Bailey, Bertil Lövgren, Bengt-Arne Wallin – trumpet
- Åke Persson, Eje Thelin – trombone
- Karl Nystrom, Bengt Olesson – French horn
- Runo Erickson – euphonium
- Lars Sloglund – oboe, English horn
- Arne Domnerus – alto saxophone, clarinet
- Bjarne Nerem – tenor saxophone
- Rune Falk – baritone saxophone, clarinet
- Tosten Wennberg – saxophones, clarinet
- Roman Dylag – bass
- Egil Johansen – drums
- Benny Golson – arranger
