= Some Blues =

Studio album by Jay McShann
- Released: 1993
- Recorded: February 2, 1990, August 8, 1992, and September 16, 1992
- Studio: Van Gelder, Englewood Cliffs, NJ, Rainbow Studio, Oslo, Norway and Soundtracks, New York City
- Genre: Jazz
- Length: 75:27
- Label: Chiaroscuro; CR(D) 320
- Producer: Hank O'Neal

Jay McShann chronology
Blue Pianos (1991)	Some Blues (1993)	The Missouri Connection (1993)

Some Blues is an album by jazz pianist Jay McShann, recorded in 1990 and 1992 and released on the Chiaroscuro label in 1993.

== Reception ==
Professional ratings
Review scores
Source	Rating
AllMusic	4/5 stars
The Penguin Guide to Jazz Recordings	2.5/4 stars

The AllMusic review by Scott Yanow noted, "Four different sessions featuring pianist Jay McShann are on this enjoyable CD... All of the sessions are quite fun and are filled by colorful solos... Overall, this is a difficult program not to love".

== Track listing ==
All compositions by Jay McShann except where noted

1. "I'm Gonna Sit Right Down and Write Myself a Letter" (Fred E. Ahlert, Joe Young) – 4:46
2. "Gee, Baby, Ain't I Good to You" (Andy Razaf, Don Redman) – 3:50
3. "Rompin' at Rudy's" – 4:37
4. "Sweet Lorraine" (Cliff Burwell, Mitchell Parish) – 5:16
5. "Daddling" – 4:36
6. "Preaching Blues" – 5:08
7. "Ho House Blues" – 6:43
8. "Smoke Gets in Your Eyes" (Jerome Kern, Otto Harbach) – 5:11
9. "Don't You Love Your Daddy No More" – 5:31
10. "Hey Hootie!" – 5:48
11. "The Jumpin' Blues" (Charlie Parker, McShann) – 4:12
12. "I Want a Little Girl" (Murray Mencher, Billy Moll) – 6:23
13. "Jazzspeak" – 13:26
- Recorded on February 2, 1990, at Van Gelder Studio, Englewood Cliffs, NJ (tracks 1–6), on August 8, 1992, at Rainbow Studio, Oslo, Norway (tracks 10–12), on September 16, 1992, (tracks 7–9) at Soundtracks, New York City, and unknown date for track 13, which is an interview with the questions edited out

== Personnel ==
- Jay McShann – piano, vocals
- Clark Terry – trumpet, flugelhorn, vocals (tracks 10–12)
- Al Grey – trombone (tracks 7–9)
- Major Holley – bass, vocals (tracks 1–6)
- Bill Crow (tracks 7–9), Milt Hinton (tracks 10–12) – bass
- Bobby Durham (tracks 1–3), Ben Riley (tracks 10–12) – drums
