= Blues Around the Clock =

Studio album by Jimmy Witherspoon
- Released: 1964
- Recorded: November 5, 1963
- Studio: Van Gelder Studio, Englewood Cliffs, New Jersey
- Genre: Blues
- Length: 29:39
- Label: Prestige; PRLP 7314
- Producer: Ozzie Cadena

Jimmy Witherspoon chronology
Evenin' Blues (1963)	Blues Around the Clock (1964)	Blue Spoon (1964)

Blues Around the Clock is an album by blues vocalist Jimmy Witherspoon which was recorded in 1963 and released on the Prestige label.

== Reception ==
Professional ratings
Review scores
Source	Rating
Allmusic	3/5 stars
The Penguin Guide to Blues Recordings	2.5/4 stars

Scott Yanow of Allmusic states, "even if nothing all that memorable occurs, the music is enjoyable".

== Track listing ==
All compositions by Jimmy Witherspoon except where noted.

1. "I Had a Dream" (Big Bill Broonzy) – 2:30
2. "Goin' to Chicago" (Count Basie, Jimmy Rushing) – 2:19
3. "No Rollin' Blues" – 4:45
4. "You Made Me Love You" (Joseph McCarthy, James V. Monaco) – 2:44
5. "My Babe" (Willie Dixon) – 1:48
6. "S.K. Blues" (Saunders King) – 3:51
7. "Whose Hat Is That" – 2:40
8. "Around the Clock" (Wynonie Harris) – 3:15
9. "He Gave Me Everything" – 3:02
10. "Goin' Down Slow" (James Oden) – 2:45

== Personnel ==
- Jimmy Witherspoon – vocals
- Paul Griffin – organ
- Chauncey "Lord" Westbrook – guitar
- Leonard Gaskin – bass
- Herbie Lovelle – drums
