= Kansas City Hustle =

Studio album by Jay McShann
- Released: 1978
- Recorded: June 20 & 21, 1978
- Studios: RCA, Toronto, Canada
- Genre: Jazz
- Length: 47:04
- Labels: Sackville; 3021
- Producers: John Norris, Bill Smith

Jay McShann chronology
A Tribute to Fats Waller (1978)	Kansas City Hustle (1978)	The Big Apple Bash (1979)

Kansas City Hustle is a solo album by pianist Jay McShann, recorded in 1978 and first released by the Canadian Sackville label as an LP before being reissued on the compilation CD Solos & Duets.

== Reception ==
Professional ratings
Review scores
Source	Rating
AllMusic	4/5 stars
DownBeat	4/5 stars

The Globe and Mail wrote that "McShann transcends the usual cliches of the music with a style that is subtle, controlled and elegant, yet he manages to retain the appropriate emotional edge."

AllMusic's Scott Yanow noted: "As usual, McShann drenches the songs he interprets with the blues, while always swinging; his basslines are always a joy."

== Track listing ==
All compositions by Jay McShann except where noted

1. "Round Midnight" (Thelonious Monk, Cootie Williams, Bernie Hanighen) – 6:00
2. "(Since I Lost My Baby) I Almost Lost My Mind" (Ivory Joe Hunter) – 4:27
3. "Kansas City Hustle" – 5:29
4. "Willow Weep for Me" (Ann Ronell) – 7:47
5. "Blue Turbulence" – 4:34
6. "Don't Get Around Much Anymore" (Duke Ellington, Bob Russell) – 4:46
7. "Baby Won't You Please Come Home" (Charles Warfield, Clarence Williams) – 4:08
8. "Rockin' Chair" (Hoagy Carmichael) – 4:29
9. "My Sweet Mama" – 5:24

== Personnel ==
- Jay McShann – piano
