= Crazy for You (John Hicks album) =

Studio album by John Hicks
- Recorded: April 3, 1992; New York City
- Genre: Jazz
- Label: Red Baron

John Hicks chronology
Now's the Time (1992)	Crazy for You (1992)	Over the Rainbow (1992)

Crazy for You is a trio album led by pianist John Hicks, recorded in 1992.

== Recording and music ==
The album was recorded in New York City on April 3, 1992. The musicians were pianist John Hicks, bassist Wilbur Bascomb, and drummer Kenny Washington. Eight of the compositions are by Gershwin; they were probably chosen in response to the popularity of the musical Crazy for You at the time.

== Release and reception ==
Professional ratings
Review scores
Source	Rating
AllMusic	3/5 stars

Crazy for You was released by Red Baron Records. The AllMusic reviewer concluded that "nothing all that surprising or purposeful occurs that justifies yet another recording of these warhorse tunes".

== Track listing ==
1. "K-Ra-Zy For You – Part 1"
2. "K-Ra-Zy For You – Part 2"
3. "Embraceable You"
4. "I Got Rhythm"
5. "They Can't Take That Away from Me"
6. "Bidin' My Time"
7. "Someone to Watch Over Me"
8. "Nice Work If You Can Get It"
9. "But Not for Me"
10. "I Got Rhythm – Reprise"

== Personnel ==
- John Hicks – piano
- Wilbur Bascomb – bass
- Kenny Washington – drums
