= Guilty! (album) =

1971 studio album by Eric Burdon and Jimmy Witherspoon

Studio album by Eric Burdon and Jimmy Witherspoon
- Released: 1971
- Recorded: July – September 1971
- Studio: MGM; Wally Heider; John Phillips; Far Out Mobile Unit
- Length: 45:31
- Label: MGM; United Artists
- Producer: Jerry Goldstein; Eric Burdon

Eric Burdon and Jimmy Witherspoon chronology
The Black-Man's Burdon (with War) (1970)	Guilty! (1971)	Sun Secrets (1974)

Guilty! (called Black & White Blues in re-releases) is a 1971 album by Eric Burdon and Jimmy Witherspoon. It was the first release by Burdon after he left War.

== Background and recording ==
In September 1970, Jimi Hendrix died after a jam session with Eric Burdon & War at Ronnie Scott's Jazz Club in London. After that, Burdon often broke down on stage. On 5 February 1971 he finally left the band in the middle of their European tour, allegedly due to exhaustion. After returning home and taking time off, the bulk of the album was recorded in summer with Witherspoon. The backing band, called Tovarish, consisted mainly of members from War.

"Going Down Slow" was recorded live in May 1971 in the San Quentin State Prison, with backing from Ike White and the San Quentin Prison Band. "Home Dream" was taken from Eric Burdon & War's back catalog; the song's title refers to the John Phillips Studios in Los Angeles. "Soledad" was released as a single. It was inspired by Burdon's experience driving down the freeway nearby Soledad State Prison. "There were blue skies and I was feeling good -- maybe I was high", he recounted. "Then I saw all that barbed wire and walls. I knew nothing about Angela Davis or the Soledad Brothers, but that doesn't matter. I just stopped at the nearest cafe and wrote the way it hit me, the way I felt." He further explained the song as a reflection of his horror, that "anyone can be driving down the freeway, listening to their stereo tapes, smoking dope and be free when, on the other side of the wire, there are guys who are being beaten up and treated like animals for doing the same thing".

== Release and reception ==
Professional ratings
Review scores
Source	Rating
Christgau's Record Guide	B

Guilty! was released in 1971 to poor sales. In a contemporary review for The Village Voice, Robert Christgau gave it a B-plus grade and found it "good in the casual dumb Burdon way, with sloppy interpretation balanced out by brilliant song choice (Chuck Berry's 'Have Mercy, Judge'), sloppy arrangements saved by a brilliant young guitarist (John Sterling)."

The album was re-released as Black & White Blues in 1976. Remastered CD issues, also with the alternate album title, were made in 1995 by MCA and in 2003 by BMG.

The Italian e-zine Viceversa ranked Guilty! number 97 on their top 100 albums of all time.

== Track listing ==
1. "I've Been Driftin' / Once Upon a Time" (Jimmy Witherspoon, Eric Burdon)
2. "Steam Roller" (James Taylor)
3. "The Laws Must Change" (John Mayall)
4. "Have Mercy Judge" (Chuck Berry)
5. "Going Down Slow" (Live) (St. Louis Jimmy Oden)
6. "Soledad" (Burdon, John Sterling)
7. "Home Dream" (Burdon)
8. "Wicked, Wicked Man" (Burdon)
9. "Headin' for Home" (Burdon, John Sterling, Kim Kesterson)
10. "The Time Has Come" (Witherspoon, Teddy Edwards)

== Personnel ==
- Eric Burdon – vocals, album design
- Jimmy Witherspoon – vocals
- Howard Scott, John Sterling – guitar
- B.B. Dickerson, Kim Kesterson – bass
- Lonnie Jordan, Terry Ryan – piano, organ
- Harold Brown, George Suranovich – drums
- Papa Dee Allen – congas
- Lee Oskar, Bob Mercereau – harmonica
- Charles Miller – tenor saxophone
- Chris Huston, George Koch, Richard Moore, Stan Agol – engineers
