= Midnight Lady Called the Blues =

Studio album by Jimmy Witherspoon
- Released: 1986
- Label: Muse
- Producer: Doc Pomus, Dr. John

Jimmy Witherspoon chronology
| Patcha, Patcha, All Night Long (1985) | Midnight Lady Called the Blues (1986) | Never Knew This Kind of Hurt Before: The Bluesway Sessions (1988) |

Midnight Lady Called the Blues is an album by the American musician Jimmy Witherspoon, released in 1986. It was recorded shortly after Witherspoon recovered from throat cancer. Midnight Lady Called the Blues was dedicated to Big Joe Turner. The album was nominated for a Grammy Award for "Best Jazz Vocal Performance, Male".

== Production ==
The album was cowritten and coproduced by Doc Pomus and Dr. John; it was allegedly recorded in eight hours. It was the first time that Witherspoon had songs written explicitly for him. Hank Crawford played saxophone on the album. Bernard Purdie played drums.

== Critical reception ==
Professional ratings
Review scores
| Source | Rating |
|---|---|
| AllMusic | 4/5 stars |
| The Encyclopedia of Popular Music | 3/5 stars |
| MusicHound Blues: The Essential Album Guide | 2/5 stars |

The Miami Herald determined that, "while Witherspoon is responsible for the blues vibrations in the studio, every musician shines in support." The Washington Post called Midnight Lady Sings the Blues "one of the grittiest R&B albums he's ever made." Cash Box deemed it "a saucy, creamy, steamy LP." Glenn O'Brien in Spin found it "a powerfully soulful, mature record from a singer, two songwriters, and a great band, all at the height of their achievement."

AllMusic wrote that "the spirited set has more than its share of interesting and exciting moments despite the obscurity of the material." The Guardian noted that the album "gave [Witherspoon's] admirers almost unalloyed satisfaction, thanks partly to sympathetic collaborators, but chiefly to his sheer professionalism." MusicHound Blues: The Essential Album Guide dismissed it as "bland, uninspired."

== Track listing ==
| No. | Title | Length |
|---|---|---|
| 1. | "New York Blues" |
| 2. | "The Barber" |
| 3. | "Blinded by Love" |
| 4. | "Happy Hard Times" |
| 5. | "Something Rotten in East St. Louis" |
| 6. | "Midnight Lady Called the Blues" |
| 7. | "Blues Hall of Fame" |

== Personnel ==
- Jimmy Witherspoon – vocals
- Dr. John – piano
- Calvin Newborn – guitar
- Wilbur Bascomb – bass
- Bernard Purdie drums
- Hank Crawford – alto saxophone
- David Newman – tenor saxophone
- Charlie Miller – trumpet
