= The Chuck Norris Experiment =

Swedish hard rock band

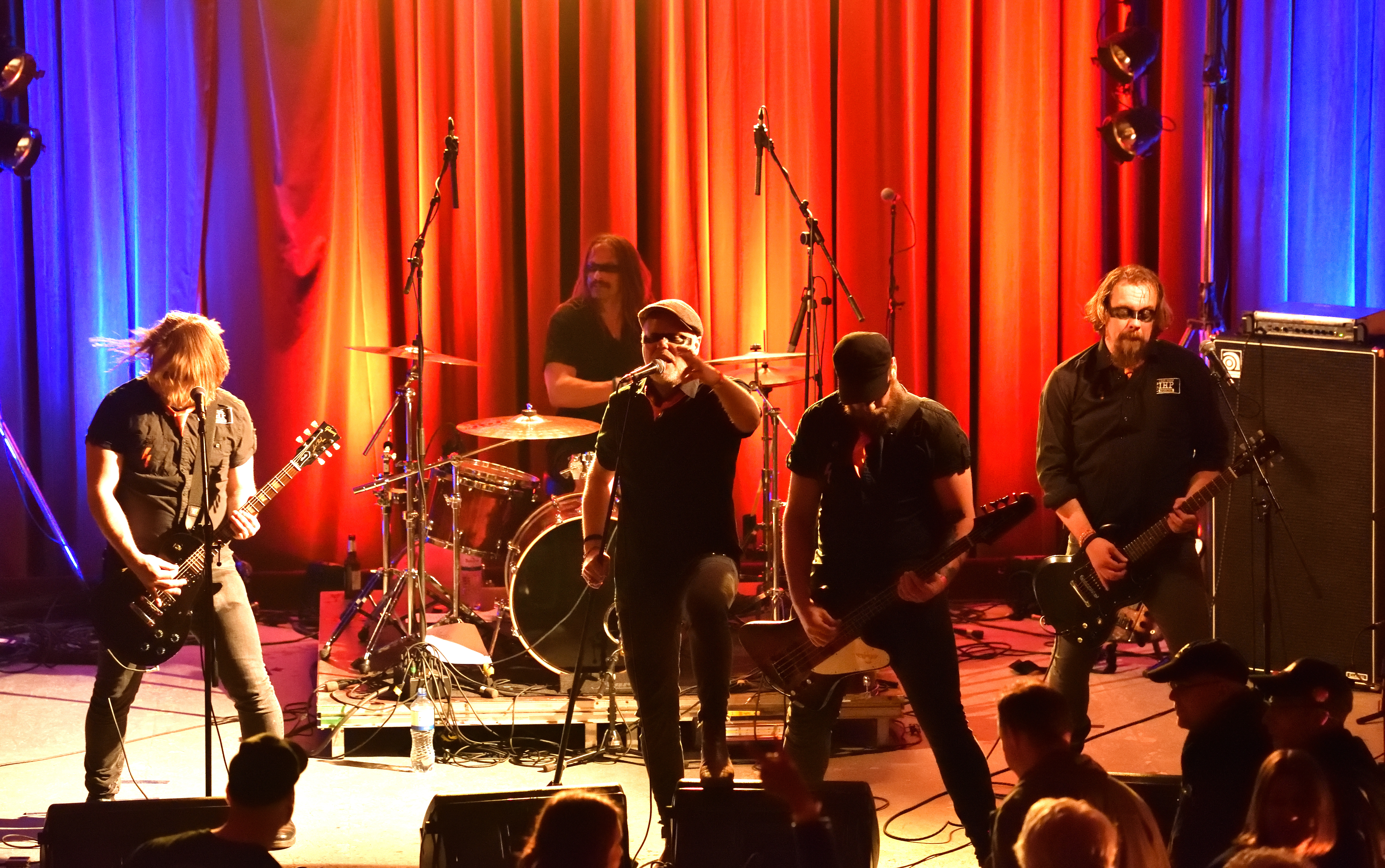
The Chuck Norris Experiment at Nacht der Gix 2016

The Chuck Norris Experiment, also known as CNE, is a Swedish hard rock band with punk rock influences formed in 2004 and based in Gothenburg. The name is not a tribute to the actor Chuck Norris, but rather to the American blues guitarist Charles "Chuck" Norris. The debut album was the self-titled Chuck Norris Experiment in 2005 on the Italian record label Scarey Records and the Finnish label Bad Attitude Records, and in the US by Devil Doll Records with adding of two bonus tracks. The band has released 8 studio albums and in 2012, a split album with Nick Oliveri.

== Members ==
- Chuck Ransom - vocals
- Chuck Rooster - guitar
- Chuck The Ripper - guitar
- Chuck Daniels - guitar
- Chuck Dakota - bass
- Chuck Buzz - drums

== Discography ==
=== Albums ===
Studio albums

- 2005: Chuck Norris Experiment
- 2006: Volume! Voltage!
- 2007: ...And The Rest Will Follow
- 2008: The Return Of Rock'n'Roll
- 2009: The Chuckies
- 2010: Dead Central
- 2014: Right Between The Eyes (peak at 23 on Sverigetopplistan)
- 2017: Chück Me!
- 2024: 20

Compilation albums

- 2010: Hot Stuff
- 2012: Best Of The First Five
- 2018: Hotter Stuff

Live albums

- 2013: Live At Rockpalast
- 2016: Live In London

Collaborations

- 2012: Nick Oliveri / Chuck Norris Experiment (split album with Nick Oliveri)
