= The Big Apple Bash =

Studio album by Jay McShann
- Released: 1979
- Recorded: August 3, 8 & 10, 1978
- Studio: Atlantic, New York City
- Genre: Jazz
- Length: 43:51
- Label: Atlantic; SD 8804
- Producer: İlhan Mimaroğlu

Jay McShann chronology
Kansas City Hustle (1978)	The Big Apple Bash (1979)	Last of the Whorehouse Piano Players (1980)

The Big Apple Bash is an album by jazz pianist Jay McShann, recorded in 1978 and released by the Atlantic label.

== Reception ==
Professional ratings
Review scores
Source	Rating
AllMusic	4.5/5 stars

The Santa Cruz Sentinel wrote that "McShann's vocals are nice and relaxed, a bit reminiscent of Hoagy Carmichael."

The AllMusic review by Scott Yanow noted: "On this excellent release, McShann appears with two groups of all-stars... The unusual grouping of swing, bop and modern stylists is successful".

== Track listing ==
1. "Crazy Legs and Friday Strut" (Jay McShann) – 7:48
2. "Georgia on My Mind" (Hoagy Carmichael, Stuart Gorrell) – 7:52
3. "Dickie's Dream" (Count Basie, Lester Young) – 6:03
4. "Ain't Misbehavin'" (Fats Waller, Harry Brooks, Andy Razaf) – 5:09
5. "I'd Rather Drink Muddy Water" (Eddie Miller) – 4:43
6. "Blue Feeling" (Duke Ellington) – 5:12
7. "Jumpin' the Blues" (McShann, Charlie Parker) – 7:12

== Personnel ==
- Jay McShann - piano, vocals
- Doc Cheatham – trumpet (tracks 3, 4, 6 & 7)
- Dickie Wells – trombone (tracks 3, 4, 6 & 7)
- Herbie Mann – flute, tenor saxophone (tracks 1–4, 6 & 7)
- Earle Warren – alto saxophone (tracks 3, 4, 6 & 7)
- Gerry Mulligan – baritone saxophone, soprano saxophone (tracks 1 & 2)
- John Scofield – guitar
- Eddie Gómez (tracks 3, 4, 6 & 7), Jack Six (tracks 1 & 2) - bass
- Connie Kay (tracks 3, 4, 6 & 7), Joe Morello (tracks 1 & 2) - drums
- Sammy Figueroa – percussion (track 1)
- Janis Siegel – vocals (track 4)
