= Feelin' the Spirit (Jimmy Witherspoon album) =

Studio album by Jimmy Witherspoon
- Released: 1959
- Recorded: 1959
- Genre: Gospel, spiritual
- Length: 22:16
- Label: HiFi; R/SR 422
- Producer: David Axelrod

Jimmy Witherspoon chronology
| Goin' to Kansas City Blues (1958) | Feelin' the Spirit (1959) | Jimmy Witherspoon at the Monterey Jazz Festival (1960) |

Feelin' the Spirit is an album by vocalist Jimmy Witherspoon featuring that was recorded in 1957 and released by the HiFi label.

== Reception ==
Professional ratings
Review scores
| Source | Rating |
|---|---|
| AllMusic | 3/5 stars |

Thomas Ward of AllMusic stated, "The finest collection of Jimmy Witherspoon's gospel songs, Feelin' the Spirit is an essential addition to any Witherspoon collection. ... Witherspoon's voice and style are so distinctive that they make these songs seem new ... Never strictly a gospel artist, all of these recordings show sincerity and, more importantly, depth, both musically and spiritually".

== Track listing ==
All compositions are traditional except where noted

1. "Every Time I Feel the Spirit" – 2:17
2. "Deep River" – 1:55
3. "I Couldn't Hear Nobody Pray" – 2:17
4. "Sometimes I Feel Like a Motherless Child" – 2:30
5. "Nobody Knows the Trouble I've Seen" – 2:07
6. "I Want to Be Ready" – 1:30
7. "Steal Away to Jesus" – 2:00
8. "Oh Mary, Don't You Weep" – 1:45
9. "Go Down Moses" – 3:00
10. "The Time Has Come" (Jimmy Witherspoon, Teddy Edwards) – 2:55

== Personnel ==
- Jimmy Witherspoon – vocals
- Randy Van Horn Singers – backing vocals
- Other musicians unidentified
