= Single Petal of a Rose =

1992 jazz piano album by John Hicks

Studio album by John Hicks
- Recorded: June 1992
- Studio: Mapleshade Studio, Upper Marlboro, Maryland
- Genre: Jazz
- Label: Mapleshade

John Hicks chronology
Over the Rainbow (1992)	Single Petal of a Rose (1992)	After the Morning (1992)

Single Petal of a Rose is an album by pianist John Hicks, recorded in 1992.

== Recording and music ==
The album was recorded at Mapleshade Studio, Upper Marlboro, Maryland, in June 1992. The musicians were pianist John Hicks, flautist Elise Wood, bassist Walter Booker, and guest trumpeter Jack Walrath.

== Release ==
Single Petal of a Rose was released by Mapleshade Records.

== Reception ==
Professional ratings
Review scores
Source	Rating
The Penguin Guide to Jazz	3/4 stars
AllMusic	3/5 stars

The Penguin Guide to Jazz observed that, "Working without percussion gives it all a very light, chamber-jazz feel, but there is enough substance to keep the level of interest high."

== Track listing ==
1. "Sometime Ago" (Sergio Mihanovich) – 5:20
2. "Infant Eyes" (Wayne Shorter) – 8:45
3. "Yes or No" (Shorter) – 4:14
4. "Ballad of a Black Man" (David Murray) – 3:49
5. "Ghosts of Yesterday" (Irene Higginbotham) – 4:30
6. "Portraits" (Charles Mingus) – 5:59
7. "Topaz" (Elise Wood) – 5:31
8. "A Child Is Born" (Thad Jones, Alec Wilder) – 7:04
9. "Single Petal of a Rose" (Duke Ellington, Billy Strayhorn) – 4:55
10. "Embraceable You" (George Gershwin, Ira Gershwin) – 9:29
11. "Virgo" (Shorter) – 5:25

== Personnel ==
- John Hicks – piano
- Elise Wood – flute
- Walter Booker – bass
- Jack Walrath – trumpet
