= Blue Spoon =

Studio album by Jimmy Witherspoon
- Released: 1964
- Recorded: February 20, 1964
- Studio: Van Gelder Studio, Englewood Cliffs, New Jersey
- Genre: Blues
- Length: 39:25
- Label: Prestige; PRLP 7327
- Producer: Ozzie Cadena

Jimmy Witherspoon chronology
Blues Around the Clock (1963)	Blue Spoon (1964)	Some of My Best Friends Are the Blues (1964)

Blue Spoon is an album by blues vocalist Jimmy Witherspoon which was recorded in 1964 and released on the Prestige label.

== Reception ==
Professional ratings
Review scores
Source	Rating
Allmusic	3/5 stars

Richie Unterberger, in his review for Allmusic, says "Blue Spoon was one of Witherspoon's jazzier sessions, still retaining his characteristic jazz-blues blend, but lighter on the soul, pop, and shouting R&B elements of some of his other releases".

== Track listing ==
All compositions by Jimmy Witherspoon except where noted.

1. "I Wonder" (Cecil Gant, Raymond Leveen) – 2:19
2. "It's Only a Low Down Dirty Shame" (Ollie Shepard) – 2:25
3. "Nobody Knows You When You're Down and Out" (Jimmy Cox) – 2:19
4. "Back to New Orleans" (Brownie McGhee, Sonny Terry) – 1:47
5. "It's All in the Game" (Charles Dawes, Carl Sigman) – 2:54
6. "Blues in the Morning" (Kenny Burrell) – 5:08
7. "I'll Never Be Free" (Bennie Benjamin, George Weiss) – 4:11
8. "Once There Lived a Fool" (Jessie Mae Robinson) – 2:32
9. "For Old Time's Sake" – 2:15
10. "The Time Has Come" – 2:46

== Personnel ==
- Jimmy Witherspoon – vocals
- Gildo Mahones – piano
- Kenny Burrell – guitar
- Eddie Khan – bass
- Roy Haynes – drums
