= Willie's Blues =

Studio album by Willie Dixon
- Released: 1959
- Recorded: December 3, 1959
- Studio: Van Gelder, Englewood Cliffs, New Jersey, United States
- Genre: Blues
- Length: 39:25
- Label: Prestige Bluesville : BVLP-1003
- Producer: Esmond Edwards

Willie Dixon chronology
Willie's Blues (1959)	Blues Every Which Way (1960)

Willie's Blues is Willie Dixon's debut album, released in 1959. Given almost equal credit on the album was his piano accompanist, Memphis Slim, who played on all of the tracks, and wrote the two numbers that were not penned by Dixon.

The album was issued on the Prestige Bluesville record label in the vinyl format. According to the original liner notes, the album was recorded during a two-hour recording span, in between flights. It was recorded at Rudy Van Gelder's studio in Englewood Cliffs, New Jersey.

The album was re-issued on CD in June 1992 on Charly - catalog reference CDCHD 349.

== Critical reception ==
Professional ratings
Review scores
Source	Rating
AllMusic	2.5/5 stars
The Encyclopedia of Popular Music	3/5 stars
The Penguin Guide to Blues Recordings	2.5/4 stars
The Rolling Stone Album Guide	4/5 stars

The Rolling Stone Album Guide wrote: "Imbued with a dark, after-hours ambience, the album is Dixon's strongest solo recording."

== Track listing ==
- All songs written by Willie Dixon, except where indicated.
1. "Nervous" 3:15
2. "Good Understanding" 2:15
3. "That's My Baby" 3:22
4. "Slim's Thing" (Memphis Slim) 3:24
5. "That's All I Want Baby" 2:15
6. "Don't You Tell Nobody" 2:09
7. "Youth to You" 3:24
8. "Sittin' and Cryin' the Blues" 3:23
9. "Built for Comfort" 2:32
10. "I Got a Razor" 4:14
11. "Go Easy" (Memphis Slim) 5:52
12. "Move Me" 3:20

== Personnel ==
- Willie Dixon - double bass, vocals
- Memphis Slim - piano
- Gus Johnson - drums
- Wally Richardson - guitar
- Al Ashby - tenor saxophone
- Harold Ashby - tenor saxophone

Technical

- Esmond Edwards - supervisor
- Dale Wright - liner notes
