= Beautiful Friendship (Elise Wood & John Hicks album) =

Studio album by Elise Wood, John Hicks
- Recorded: February 20 and November 15, 2000; New York City
- Genre: Jazz
- Label: HiWood

John Hicks chronology
Hicks Time (1998?)	Beautiful Friendship (2000)	Music in the Key of Clark (2001)

Beautiful Friendship is an album by flautist Elise Wood and pianist John Hicks, recorded in 2000.

== Recording and music ==
The album was recorded in New York City on February 20 and November 15, 2000.

== Release ==
Beautiful Friendship was released by HiWood.

== Reception ==
Professional ratings
Review scores
Source	Rating
AllMusic	4/5 stars
The Penguin Guide to Jazz	2.5/4 stars

The Penguin Guide to Jazz commented that Wood's "broad vibrato is heard front and centre in a set of sentimental ballads that rarely rises above easy listening." The AllMusic reviewer concluded that, "It's easy to understand why they enjoy making music together after hearing this delightful disc."

== Track listing ==
1. "Autumn in New York"
2. "A Beautiful Friendship"
3. "But Beautiful"
4. "Corcovado"
5. "Sophisticated Lady"
6. "April in Paris"
7. "My Romance"
8. "Skylark"
9. "Bewitched, Bothered and Bewildered"
10. "Afternoon in Paris"
11. "Some Other Time"

== Personnel ==
- John Hicks – piano
- Elise Wood – flute
