= Gus Johnson (jazz musician) =

American swing drummer (1913–2000)

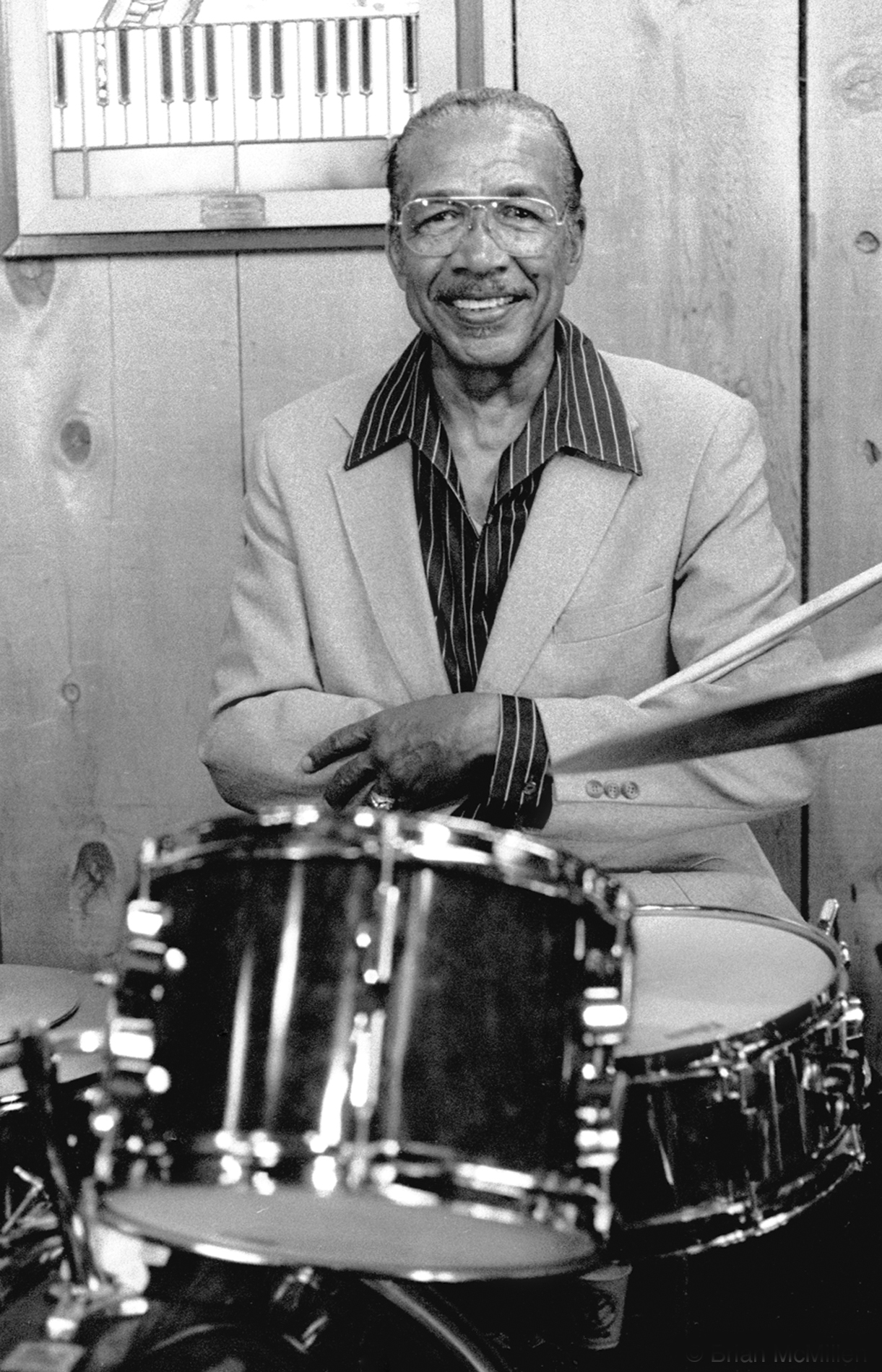
- Johnson at Bach Dancing & Dynamite Society, Half Moon Bay, California, 1980s

Background information
- Born: Gus Johnson; November 15, 1913; Tyler, Texas, United States
- Died: February 6, 2000 (aged 86) Denver, Colorado, United States
- Genres: Swing, big band
- Occupation: Musician
- Instrument: Drums
- Years active: 1922–1990

Gus Johnson (November 15, 1913 – February 6, 2000) was an American swing drummer in various jazz bands, born in Tyler, Texas, United States. After learning to play drums from his next-door neighbor, Johnson occasionally played professionally at the age of ten in the Lincoln Theater, and performed in various local groups, most notable McDavid's Blue Rhythm Band. Upon graduating from Booker T. Washington High School, Johnson moved to Kansas City, where he took up drumming full-time. He joined Jay McShann's Orchestra in 1938, with his music career being interrupted by his conscription into the military in 1943.

In 1945, Johnson returned from his stint in the military and relocated to Chicago to perform in the Jesse Miller Band. Johnson played on Willie Dixon's debut album, Willie's Blues. He subsequently played alongside Count Basie and was recorded on the album, Basie Rides Again, in 1952. Following a recovery from appendicitis, Johnson was featured in numerous groups and dozens of recordings in the 1960s. In 1972, his former bandmates from Jay McShann's Orchestra reconvened to record Going to Kansas City. Although Johnson continued to tour into the 1980s, he developed Alzheimer's disease in 1989, which he struggled with until his death on February 6, 2000.

== Discography ==
With Manny Albam

- The Drum Suite (RCA Victor, 1956) with Ernie Wilkins
- Jazz Goes to the Movies (Impulse!, 1962)

With Count Basie

- Dance Session (Clef, 1953)
- Basie Jazz (Clef, 1954)
- Dance Session Album#2 (Clef, 1954)
- Basie (Clef, 1954)
- The Count! (Clef, 1955)
- The Count Basie Story (Roulette, 1960)
- Get Together (Pablo, 1979)

With Lawrence Brown

- Inspired Abandon (Impulse!, 1965)

With Ray Bryant

- Dancing the Big Twist (Columbia, 1961)

With Buck Clayton

- Buck & Buddy Blow the Blues (Swingville, 1961) with Buddy Tate
- Jam Session (Chiaroscuro, 1974)

With Rosemary Clooney

- Rosemary Clooney Sings the Music of Irving Berlin (Concord, 1984)

With Al Cohn

- Son of Drum Suite (RCA Victor, 1960)
- Either Way (Fred Miles Presents, 1961) with Zoot Sims

With Willie Dixon and Memphis Slim

- Willie's Blues (Bluesville, 1959)

With Ella Fitzgerald

- Ella at Juan-Les-Pins (Verve, 1964)
- Ella in Rome: The Birthday Concert (Verve, 1958)
- Ella in Berlin: Mack the Knife (Verve, 1960)

With Coleman Hawkins

- Night Hawk (Swingville, 1960)

With Johnny Hodges

- Triple Play (RCA Victor, 1967)

With Lena Horne

- Stormy Weather (RCA Victor, 1957)

With Willis Jackson

- Really Groovin' (Prestige, 1961)
- In My Solitude (Moodsville, 1961)

With Herbie Mann

- Salute to the Flute (Epic, 1957)

With Gerry Mulligan

- The Gerry Mulligan Quartet (Verve, 1962)
- Spring Is Sprung (Philips, 1962)
- Gerry Mulligan '63 (Verve, 1963)

With Joe Newman

- Salute to Satch (RCA Victor, 1956)

With Chico O'Farrill

- Nine Flags (Impulse!, 1966)

With Freda Payne

- After the Lights Go Down Low and Much More!!! (Impulse!, 1964)

With Oscar Pettiford

- The Oscar Pettiford Orchestra in Hi-Fi Volume Two (ABC-Paramount, 1957)

With Al Sears

- Rockin' in Rhythm (Swingville, 1960) as The Swingville All-Stars with Taft Jordan and Hilton Jefferson

With Zoot Sims

- The Modern Art of Jazz by Zoot Sims (Dawn, 1956)
- Tonite's Music Today (Storyvile, 1956) with Bob Brookmeyer
- Zoot Sims Plays Alto, Tenor, and Baritone (ABC-Paramount)

With The Staple Singers

- Hammer and Nails (Rivers, 1962)

With Rex Stewart and Cootie Williams

- The Big Challenge (Jazztone, 1957)

With Ralph Sutton and Ruby Braff

- R & R (Chiaroscuro, 1979)
- Remembered (DVD) (Arbors Records, 2004)

With Ralph Sutton and Jay McShann

- Last of the Whorehouse Piano Players (Chaz Jazz, 1980) - originally released on 2 LPs as The Last of the Whorehouse Piano Players: Two Pianos Vol. I & Vol. II
- Last of the Whorehouse Piano Players (Chiaroscuro, 1989)

With Ralph Sutton and Kenny Davern

- Ralph Sutton and Kenny Davern (Chiaroscuro, 1998)

With Buddy Tate

- Buddy Tate and His Buddies (Chiaroscuro, 1973)

With Frank Wess

- Jazz for Playboys (Savoy, 1957)
- Opus de Blues (Savoy, 1984)

With Lem Winchester

- Another Opus (New Jazz, 1960)

With Kai Winding

- The Swingin' States (Columbia, 1958)
- Solo (Verve, 1963)
