= The Missouri Connection =

Studio album by Jay McShann, John Hicks
- Released: 1993
- Recorded: September 14, 15, 1992
- Studio: Van Gelder, Englewood Cliffs, NJ
- Genre: Jazz
- Length: 63:21
- Label: Reservoir
- Producer: Mark Feldman

John Hicks chronology
After the Morning (1992)	The Missouri Connection (1993)	Blues March: Portrait of Art Blakey (1992)

Jay McShann chronology
Some Blues (1993)	The Missouri Connection (1993)	Hootie's Jumpin' Blues (1997)

The Missouri Connection is an album by pianists Jay McShann and John Hicks, recorded in 1992.

== Recording and music ==
The album was recorded at Rudy Van Gelder Studio, Englewood Cliffs, New Jersey, on September 14 and 15, 1992. Most of the tracks are piano duets between Jay McShann and John Hicks, with the former also singing on two tracks. "Sweet Lorraine" is played solo by McShann, and Hicks plays "Reflections" alone.

== Release ==
The Missouri Connection was released by Reservoir Records.

== Reception ==
Professional ratings
Review scores
Source	Rating
AllMusic	4/5 stars
The Penguin Guide to Jazz Recordings	3/4 stars

The AllMusic reviewer commented that, "While Hicks is a more modern player than McShann, the two pianists blend together quite well and this combination, which may not seem all that logical at first glance, works."

== Track listing ==
1. "The Missouri Connection" (Jay McShann, John Hicks) – 6:07
2. "I'm Getting Sentimental Over You" (George Bassman, Ned Washington) – 7:29
3. "I'm Just a Lucky So-and-So" (Duke Ellington, Mack David) – 7:49
4. "Jumpin' the Blues" (McShann, Charlie Parker) – 4:28
5. "Sweet Lorraine" (Cliff Burwell, Mitchell Parish) – 5:21
6. "Reflections" (Thelonious Monk) – 4:37
7. "What Am I Here For" (Ellington, Frankie Laine) – 7:51
8. "Fiddlin' Around" (McShann) – 5:20
9. "All of Me" (Gerald Marks, Seymour Simons) – 4:03
10. "In a Sentimental Mood" (Ellington, Manny Kurtz, Irving Mills) – 4:16
11. "There Will Never Be Another You" (Harry Warren, Mack Gordon) – 5:48

== Personnel ==
- Jay McShann – piano, vocals
- John Hicks – piano
