= Hicks Time =

Studio album by John Hicks
- Released: 1998
- Genre: Jazz
- Label: Passin' Thru
- Producer: Oliver Lake, Richard Franklin

John Hicks chronology
Ow! (1998)	Hicks Time (1998?)	Beautiful Friendship (2000)

Hicks Time is an album of solo performances by jazz pianist John Hicks.

== Music and recording ==
All but two of the compositions are by Hicks. The other two – "Reminds Me" and "Jest a Little" – were by Oliver Lake, who was also the album's co-producer, along with Richard Franklin. "Redd's Blues" is a tribute to pianist Freddie Redd.

== Release and reception ==
The album was released by Passin' Thru Records, around 1998. Hicks' playing was described by the JazzTimes reviewer as ranging "from the lush 19th century Romantic tradition through the vast-American-plains spaciousness of Aaron Copland, while also ingeniously incorporating the swinging phrasing of classic jazz and the challenging twists and turns of post-bop, as epitomized by longtime influence John Coltrane."

== Track listing ==
1. "Naima's Love Song"
2. "Peanut Butter"
3. "Hicks' Time"
4. "April Eyes"
5. "Redd's Blues"
6. "Reminds Me"
7. "Jest a Little"
8. "Two Heartbeats"
9. "Heart to Heart"
10. "Steadfast"
11. "After the Morning"

== Personnel ==
- John Hicks – piano
