= A Tribute to Fats Waller =

Studio album by Jay McShann
- Released: 1978
- Recorded: June 20 & 21, 1978
- Studio: RCA Studios, Toronto, Canada
- Genre: Jazz
- Length: 47:04
- Label: Sackville; 3019
- Producer: John Norris, Bill Smith

Jay McShann chronology
The Last of the Blue Devils (1978)	A Tribute to Fats Waller (1978)	Kansas City Hustle (1978)

A Tribute to Fats Waller is a solo album by pianist Jay McShann that was recorded in 1978 and first released by the Canadian Sackville label as an LP before being reissued on the compilation CD Solos & Duets.

== Reception ==
Professional ratings
Review scores
Source	Rating
AllMusic	3/5 stars

AllMusic's Scott Yanow noted "Jay McShann does not sound at all like Fats Waller, but he is effective during this set of unaccompanied piano solos (no vocals) in bringing back to life nine of Waller's tunes, in his own way. A more blues-based improviser than Waller, with a sparser left hand (swing rather than stride), McShann is in spirited form".

== Track listing ==
1. "Honeysuckle Rose" (Fats Waller, Andy Razaf) – 4:55
2. "Keepin' Out of Mischief Now" (Waller, Razaf) – 3:58
3. "Then I'll Be Tired of You" (Arthur Schwartz, Yip Harburg) – 4:30
4. "Ain't Misbehavin'" (Waller, Razaf, Harry Brooks) – 5:15
5. "All My Life" (Sam H. Stept, Sidney D. Mitchell) – 5:07
6. "I'm Gonna Sit Right Down and Write Myself a Letter" (Fred E. Ahlert, Joe Young) – 5:27
7. "I Ain't Got Nobody" (Spencer Williams, Roger A. Graham) – 3:58
8. "Squeeze Me" (Waller, Clarence Wiliams) – 4:55
9. "Lulu's Back In Town" (Harry Warren, Al Dubin) – 3:55

== Personnel ==
- Jay McShann – piano
