= Baby, Baby, Baby (Mindy Carson album) =

Studio album by Mindy Carson
- Released: 1958
- Genre: Jazz
- Label: Columbia

Baby, Baby, Baby is a 1958 album by Mindy Carson. The title track, "Baby Baby Baby" with lyrics by Mack David, music by Jerry Livingston was a No.12 hit single for Teresa Brewer who sang the song in the film Those Redheads from Seattle (1953).

== Track listing ==
1. Baby, Baby, Baby
2. I'm Not Just Anybody's Baby
3. I Don't Want To Walk Without You, Baby
4. Baby Face
5. Don't Cry, Cry Baby
6. My Melancholy Baby
7. Everybody Loves My Baby
8. I Can't Give You Anything But Love, Baby
9. I'm Nobody's Baby
10. My Baby Just Cares For Me
11. I Found A New Baby
12. Baby Won't You Please Come Home
