= Blues for Easy Livers =

Studio album by Jimmy Witherspoon
- Released: 1966
- Recorded: 1965–1966; New York City
- Genre: Blues
- Length: 38:32
- Labels: Prestige; PRLP 7475
- Producer: Peter Paul

Jimmy Witherspoon chronology
Spoon in London (1965)	Blues for Easy Livers (1966)	Blues for Spoon and Groove (1966)

Blues for Easy Livers is an album by blues vocalist Jimmy Witherspoon which was recorded in 1965 and released on the Prestige label.

== Reception ==
Professional ratings
Review scores
Source	Rating
Allmusic	3/5 stars
The Penguin Guide to Blues Recordings	3/4 stars

Richie Unterberger, in his review for Allmusic, says "Despite the title, this actually leans considerably further to the jazz side of Witherspoon's muse than the blues one... Witherspoon's one of the masters of closing-time bluesy jazz, and he doesn't let anyone down on that account on this relaxed (but not sleepy) session".

== Track listing ==
All compositions by Jimmy Witherspoon except where noted.

1. "Lotus Blossom" (Sam Coslow, Arthur Johnston, Billy Strayhorn) – 3:03
2. "Gee, Baby, Ain't I Good to You" (Andy Razaf, Don Redman) – 3:11
3. "Travelin' Light" (Jimmy Mundy, Trummy Young) – 4:15
4. "P.S. I Love You" (Gordon Jenkins, Johnny Mercer) – 3:04
5. "I'll Always Be in Love With You" (Bud Green, Herman Ruby, Sam H. Stept) – 2:29
6. "Don't Worry 'bout Me" (Rube Bloom, Ted Koehler) – 3:02
7. "Easy Living" (Ralph Rainger, Leo Robin) – 3:24
8. "Embraceable You" (George Gershwin, Ira Gershwin) – 3:08
9. "Blues in the Night" (Harold Arlen, Johnny Mercer) – 4:04
10. "Trouble in Mind" (Richard M. Jones) – 2:23
11. "How Long Will It Take for Me to Become a Man" (Traditional) – 3:16
12. "I Got It Bad (and That Ain't Good)" (Duke Ellington, Paul Francis Webster) – 3:13

== Personnel ==
- Jimmy Witherspoon – vocals
- Bill Watrous – trombone
- Pepper Adams – baritone saxophone
- Roger Kellaway – piano, arranger
- Richard Davis – bass
- Mel Lewis – drums
