= Now's the Time (New York Unit album) =

Studio album by New York Unit
- Recorded: March 15, 1992; Tokyo, Japan
- Genre: Jazz
- Label: Paddle Wheel

John Hicks chronology
Friends Old and New (1992)	Now's the Time (1992)	Crazy for You (1992)

Now's the Time is an album by New York Unit, consisting of trumpeter Hannibal Marvin Peterson, pianist John Hicks, bassist Richard Davis, and drummer Tatsuya Nakamura. It was recorded in 1992.

== Recording and music ==
The album was recorded in Tokyo on March 15, 1992. The New York Unit had performed in concert in Tokyo earlier that month. It was a quartet recording, with trumpeter Hannibal Marvin Peterson, pianist John Hicks, bassist Richard Davis, and drummer Tatsuya Nakamura. The material was diverse – "drawn from standards, swing, bop, and even New Orleans jazz".

== Release and reception ==
Professional ratings
Review scores
Source	Rating
AllMusic	4.5/5 stars

Now's the Time was released by Paddle Wheel Records. The AllMusic reviewer concluded that "The rhythm section is in great form, but Peterson's contributions leave the most lasting impressions. "

== Track listing ==
1. "Nothing Ever Changes My Love for You"
2. "In a Sentimental Mood"
3. "Now's the Time"
4. "Smoke Gets in Your Eyes"
5. "South of the Border"
6. "Only You"
7. "Turquoise"
8. "Glory Glory Hallelujah"
9. "When the Saints Go Marching In"

== Personnel ==
- Hannibal Marvin Peterson – trumpet
- John Hicks – piano
- Richard Davis – bass
- Tatsuya Nakamura – drums
