= Music media in Italy =

There are an abundance of paper, on-line and broadcast media in Italy that cover all genres of music.

When most Italians were illiterate, well into early 20th century, villagers depended on live musicians, called cantastorie to learn about current events; that was their music media, but the tradition is dying in the 21st century.

== Print media and/or on-line magazines ==
Many Italian magazines about music now maintain a presence on the Internet with on-line versions of their Italian music.

== Broadcast media ==
Nationwide, the state-run broadcasting network, RAI (Radio audizioni italiane), provides three TV channels and three AM or FM radio channels. There are also three private TV networks, run by the Mediaset company, which has been criticized for its mindless and poor programming as Merdaset. All provide live or recorded music many hours per week. At the height of his power, Silvio Berlusconi essentially controlled the media scene in Italy, which included music. Berlusconi has been credited with boosting the careers of musicians such as Cristina D'Avena. He has also been criticized by musicians.

Many large cities in Italy have local TV stations, as well, which may provide live folk or dialect music often of interest only to the immediate area. Additionally, there are many hundreds of private FM radio stations broadcasting in Italy, with much of the programming devoted to music.

== See also ==
- Media of Italy
