= Toronto Jazz Festival =

Annual music festival in Toronto since 1987

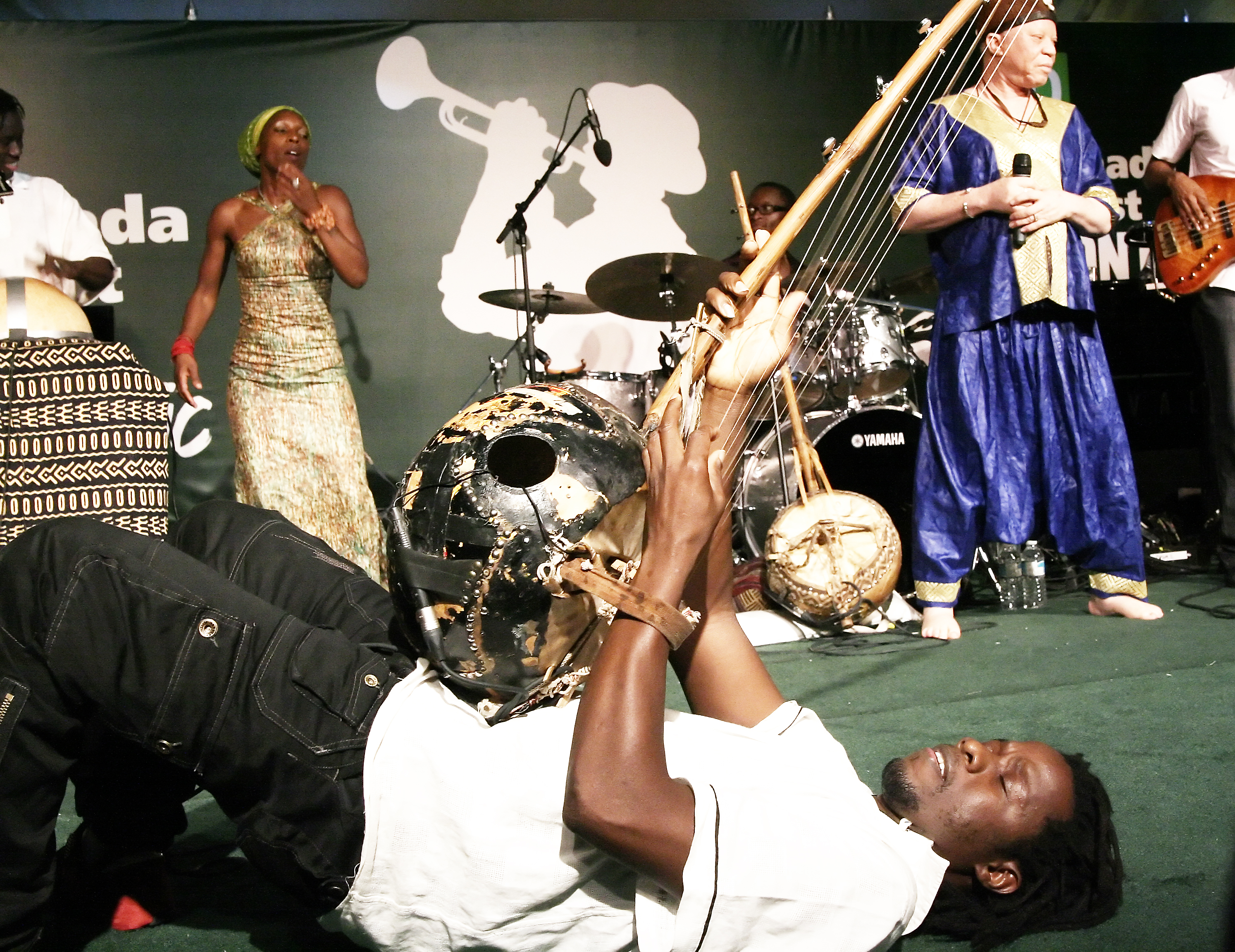
Toronto Jazz Festival 2008

The Toronto Jazz Festival is a jazz event in Toronto which takes place for 10 days in late June through early July. Like the Beaches International Jazz Festival, most of the events are outdoors and located throughout the downtown core. The hub of the festival is Nathan Phillips Square, with more than 40 other locations spread out all across the city. It attracts over 500,000 people and is the city's third largest annual music festival next to NXNE and The Beaches International Jazz Festival. Incorporating a blend of jazz styles - from straight-ahead to bop to fusion to avant-garde- with tastes of other genres (for example, blues, funk, R&B, hip-hop, Latin, etc...) the festival has something for everyone. It was formerly known as the DuMaurier Jazz Festival, until the ban on tobacco advertising by the federal government forced the need for a new sponsor. Today, the festival is sponsored by TD Bank and has since dropped the word "Downtown" from its title.

Originally started in 1987, the festival was co-founded by Executive Producer Patrick Taylor and Former Artistic Director Jim Galloway; currently, the Artistic Director is Josh Grossman. Roy Thomson Hall, the CN Tower and Metro Convention Centre were the three venues for that inaugural season. Miles Davis, Roberta Flack and Tony Bennett were the headliners that year.

The festival has a long history of drawing top jazz artists like Roy Hargrove, Christian McBride, The Huntertones, Medeski, Martin and Wood, Hiromi Uehara, Kurt Elling and Superblue, and many others. But the loss of principal sponsorship money from long-time supporter TD Bank (starting in 2025) has seen the overall quality and variety of performers diminish compared to acts drawn to jazz festivals in Montreal and Ottawa.
