= Ralph Sutton =

American jazz pianist (1922–2001)

- Born: Ralph Earl Sutton; November 4, 1922; Hamburg, Missouri, U.S.
- Died: December 30, 2001 (aged 79) Evergreen, Colorado
- Genres: Jazz; Stride
- Occupation: Musician
- Instrument: Piano
- Label: Arbors

Ralph Earl Sutton (November 4, 1922 – December 30, 2001) was an American jazz pianist born in Hamburg, Missouri. He was a stride pianist in the tradition of James P. Johnson and Fats Waller.

== Biography ==
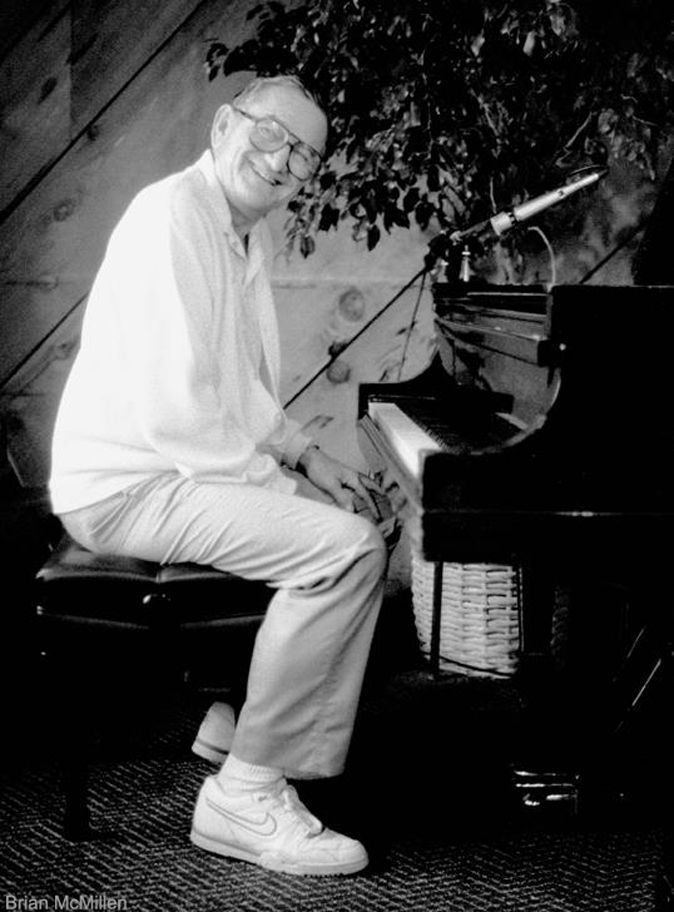
Ralph Sutton at the Bach Dancing & Dynamite Society, Half Moon Bay, California, July 26, 1987

Sutton was born in Hamburg, Missouri, United States, the son of Earl and Edna Sutton. His younger sister Barbara Sutton Curtis was also a jazz pianist.

Sutton had a stint as a session musician with Jack Teagarden's band, before joining the US Army during World War II. After the war, he played at various venues in Missouri, eventually ending up at Eddie Condon's club in Greenwich Village. In 1956, he relocated to San Francisco, California, where he recorded several albums with Bob Scobey's dixieland band. From the 1960s onward, he worked mostly on his own. However, when the World's Greatest Jazz Band was established in 1968, he was the natural choice for piano. He left that band in 1974 due to the extensive travel involved, and joined an old sidekick, Peanuts Hucko, in a quartet in Denver, near his home in Evergreen, Colorado.

Fellow jazz pianist Jess Stacy said this about Ralph Sutton: "He is a superb piano player and a great guy. There's nothing upstage about him. I really admire the way he plays. He's one of the few piano players who uses both hands, and it's sure nice to know that a player like Ralph is still around. I can't say enough good things about him. He's one of the greats, and I hope he gets the recognition he deserves."

Sutton died of a stroke in Evergreen, Colorado, at the age of 79.

== Discography ==
=== As leader ===
- Piano Solos in the Classic Jazz Tradition (Riverside, 1949, 1952)
- Piano Moods (Columbia, 1950)
- Plays Music Of "Fats" Waller (Columbia, 1951)
- I Got Rhythm (Decca, 1954)
- Backroom Piano (Down Home, 1955)
- Wondrous Piano, the Private Family Recordings, (Arbors, 1961)
- Ragtime U.S.A. (Roulette, 1963)
- Off the Cuff (Audiophile, 1976 [1982])
- Ralph Sutton – Live! (Flyright, 1978)
- Ralph Sutton Quartet (Storyville, 1978)
- Ralph Sutton at St. George Church, England (Arbors, 1992)
- Ralph Sutton at Maybeck (Concord, 1993)
- The Joint is Jumpin': the Music of Fats Waller (Sackville 1999 [2003], with Bob Barnard)

=== As co-leader ===
With George Barnes (musician)

- As Good As It Gets (Victoria)

With Ruby Braff

- Remembered (Arbors)
- Ralph & Ruby Duet 1980 (Chaz Jazz Records inc.) CJ101
- Ralph & Ruby Quartet 1980 (Chaz Jazz Records inc.) CJ102

With Dick Cary

- Rendezvous at Sunnie's 1969 (Arbors)

With Kenny Davern

- Ralph Sutton and Kenny Davern Vol. I 1980 (Chaz Jazz Records inc.) CJ105
- Ralph Sutton and Kenny Davern Vol. II 1980 (Chaz Jazz Records inc.) CJ106

With Dick Hyman

- Dick Hyman/Ralph Sutton 1993 (Concord)

With Jay McShann

- Last of the Whorehouse Piano Players (Chaz Jazz, 1980) - originally released on 2 LPs as The Last of the Whorehouse Piano Players: Two Pianos Vol. I & Vol. II
- Last of the Whorehouse Piano Players (Chiaroscuro, 1989)

With Johnny Varro

- *A Pair of Kings (Arbors)
