= Jimmy Witherspoon =

American jump blues singer (1920–1997)

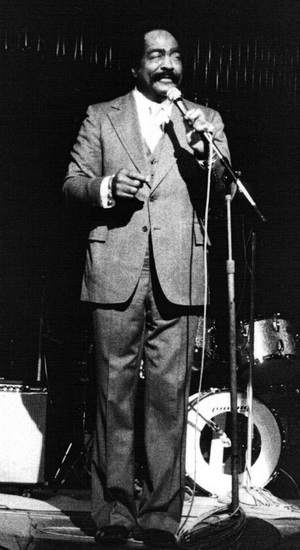
- Witherspoon in June 1976

Background information
- Born: August 8, 1920; Gurdon, Arkansas, U.S.
- Died: September 18, 1997 (aged 77) Los Angeles, California, U.S.
- Genres: Blues, jump blues, jazz
- Occupation: Singer
- Years active: 1940s–1995

James Witherspoon (August 8, 1920 – September 18, 1997) was an American jump blues and jazz singer.

== Early life, family and education ==
Witherspoon was born in Gurdon, Arkansas. His father was a railroad worker who sang in local choirs, and his mother was a piano player. Witherspoon's grandson Ahkello Witherspoon is a cornerback for the Los Angeles Rams.

Witherspoon served in the Merchant Marines until 1944.

== Career ==
Witherspoon first attracted attention singing in Calcutta, India, with Teddy Weatherford's band, which made regular radio broadcasts over the US Armed Forces Radio Service during World War II. Having made his first records with Jay McShann's band in 1945, he first recorded under his own name in 1947, and two years later, still with the McShann band, he had his first hit, "Ain't Nobody's Business", a song that came to be regarded as his signature tune. In 1950 he had hits with two more songs closely identified with him—"No Rollin' Blues" and "Big Fine Girl"—and another hit with "Failing by Degrees" and "New Orleans Woman", recorded with the Gene Gilbeaux Orchestra (which included Herman Washington and Don Hill) for Modern Records. They were recorded at a live performance on May 10, 1949, at a "Just Jazz" concert in Pasadena, California, sponsored by Gene Norman. Another classic Witherspoon composition is "Times Gettin' Tougher Than Tough".

Witherspoon performed at four of the Cavalcade of Jazz concerts held in Los Angeles at Wrigley Field, which were produced by Leon Hefflin Sr. His first performance was at the fourth Cavalcade of Jazz on September 12, 1948, with Dizzy Gillespie as the featured artist, along with Frankie Laine, Little Miss Cornshucks, The Sweethearts of Rhythm, Joe Liggins's Honeydrippers, Joe Turner, The Blenders, and The Sensations. The program description stated that Witherspoon was "one of the most sought-after blues singers in the business. He has a strong, clear voice and diction that you would hear in the classics. Although he has been quite successful singing the blues, Witherspoon can sing ballads with a surprising sweetness." He played at the fifth Cavalcade of Jazz concert on July 10, 1949, along with Lionel Hampton, The Hamptones, Buddy Banks and his Orchestra, Big Jay McNeely, and Smiley Turner. Witherspoon returned for the seventh Cavalcade of Jazz concert on July 8, 1951, and performed alongside Billy Eckstine, Lionel Hampton and his Revue, Percy Mayfield, Joe Liggins's Honeydrippers, and Roy Brown. His last appearance at the Cavalcade of Jazz was at its eighth edition on June 1, 1952. Also featured that day were Anna Mae Winburn and Her Sweethearts, Jerry Wallace, Toni Harper, Roy Brown and His Mighty Men, Louis Jordan and his Orchestra, and Josephine Baker.

Witherspoon's style of blues—as a "blues shouter"—was no longer fashionable in the mid-1950s, but he returned to popularity with his 1959 album Jimmy Witherspoon at the Monterey Jazz Festival, featuring Roy Eldridge, Woody Herman, Ben Webster, Coleman Hawkins, Earl Hines, and Mel Lewis. Witherspoon later recorded with Gerry Mulligan, Leroy Vinnegar, Richard "Groove" Holmes, and T-Bone Walker.

== Tours and successes ==
In 1961 he toured Europe with Buck Clayton and returned to the UK on many occasions, featuring on a mid-1960s live UK recording, Spoon Sings and Swings (1966), with tenor sax player Dick Morrissey's quartet. In 1970, Witherspoon appeared on Brother Jack McDuff's London Blue Note recording To Seek a New Home, together with British jazz musicians, including Dick Morrissey, and Terry Smith. In the 1970s, Witherspoon also recorded the album Guilty! (later released on CD as Black & White Blues) with Eric Burdon and featuring Ike White & the San Quentin Prison Band. He then toured with a band of his own featuring Robben Ford and Russ Ferrante. A recording from this period, Spoonful, featured Witherspoon accompanied by Robben Ford, Joe Sample, Cornell Dupree, Thad Jones, and Bernard Purdie. He continued performing and recording into the 1990s.

Other performers with whom Witherspoon recorded include Jimmy Rowles, Earl "Fatha" Hines, Vernon Alley, Mel Lewis, Teddy Edwards, Gerald Wiggins, John Clayton, Paul Humphrey, Pepper Adams, Kenny Burrell, Harry "Sweets" Edison, Jimmy Smith, Long John Baldry, Junior Mance, Ellington bassist Jimmy Woode, Kenny Clarke, Gerry Mulligan, Jim Mullen, Count Basie, Van Morrison, Dutch Swing College Band, and Gene Gilbeaux.

== Acting ==
In the 1995 film Georgia, Witherspoon portrayed Trucker, a traveling, gun-collecting blues singer who has a relationship with the troubled character Sadie, played by Jennifer Jason Leigh.

He played Nate Williams in The Black Godfather (1974) and Percy in To Sleep with Anger (1990).

== Personal life and death ==
Witherspoon died of throat cancer on September 18, 1997, in Los Angeles, California.

== Discography ==
=== Albums ===
- 1947-48: The Chronological Jimmy Witherspoon 1947-1948 (Classics 'Blues & Rhythm series', [2003])
- 1948-49: The Chronological Jimmy Witherspoon 1948-1949 (Classics 'Blues & Rhythm series', [2004])
- 1950-51: The Chronological Jimmy Witherspoon 1950-1951 (Classics 'Blues & Rhythm series', [2006])
- 1952-53: Miss Miss Mistreater: The Very Best of Jimmy Witherspoon (King/Collectables, [2004]) [Federal sessions]
- 1954-59: Spoon So Easy (The Chess Years) (Chess/MCA, [1990])
- Wilbur De Paris Plays & Jimmy Witherspoon Sings New Orleans Blues (Atlantic, 1957)
- Goin' to Kansas City Blues with Jay McShann (RCA Victor, 1957 [1958])
- Singin' the Blues (World Pacific, 1958 [1959])
- At the Monterey Jazz Festival (HiFi Jazz/Everest, 1959 [1960])
- Feelin' the Spirit (HiFi Jazz/Everest, 1959)
- At the Renaissance with Gerry Mulligan, Ben Webster (HiFi Jazz/Everest, 1959 [1960])
- Jimmy Witherspoon (Crown, 1960)
- Sings the Blues (Crown, 1960)
- With Buck Clayton (Vogue [UK], 1961)
- Spoon (Reprise, 1961)
- Hey, Mrs. Jones (Reprise, 1962)
- Roots with Ben Webster (Reprise, 1962)
- Baby, Baby, Baby (Prestige, 1963)
- Evenin' Blues (Prestige, 1963 [1964])
- Blues Around the Clock (Prestige, 1963 [1964])
- Blue Spoon (Prestige, 1964 [1965])
- Some of My Best Friends Are the Blues (Prestige, 1964 [1965])
- Spoon in London (Prestige, 1965 [1966])
- Blues for Easy Livers (Prestige, 1965 [1966])
- Blues for Spoon and Groove with Richard "Groove" Holmes (Surrey, 1965)
- Jimmy Witherspoon in Person (Vogue [UK], 1965) reissue of With Buck Clayton
- Spoon Sings and Swings with Dick Morrissey (Fontana [UK], 1966)
- A Spoonful of Blues (Ember, 1966) reissue of Jimmy Witherspoon
- A Blue Point of View (Verve, 1966)
- The Blues is Now with Jack McDuff (Verve, 1967)
- A Spoonful of Soul (Verve, 1968)
- Live with Ben Webster (Stateside [UK], 1968)
- The Blues Singer (ABC/Bluesway, 1969)
- Hunh! (ABC/Bluesway 1970)
- Handbags and Gladrags (ABC, 1971)
- Guilty with Eric Burdon (MGM, 1971)
- The Spoon Concerts (Fantasy [2LP], 1972) reissues of At the Monterey Jazz Festival and At the Renaissance
- Previously Unreleased Recordings with Ben Webster (Verve, 1973)
- Love is a Five Letter Word (Capitol, 1975)
- Spoonful (Blue Note, 1975)
- Live Jimmy Witherspoon & Robben Ford (LAX/Avenue Jazz/Rhino, 1977)
- Live at the Watts Jazz Festival, Volume 1 with Willie Bobo, Gene Ammons (LAX/Avenue Jazz/Rhino, 1977)
- Live in Paris with Buck Clayton (Jazz Vogue [UK], 1977)
- Sings the Blues (Black & Blue, 1978)
- Spoon's Life (Isabel, 1980)
- Olympia Concert (Inner City, 1980) reissue of Jimmy Witherspoon in Person
- Big Blues (JSP, 1981)
- Sings the Blues with Panama Francis and the Savoy Sultans (Muse, 1983)
- Spoonful O' Blues (Kent, 1984) compilation
- Patcha, Patcha, All Night Long with Big Joe Turner (Pablo, 1985)
- Midnight Lady Called the Blues (Muse, 1986)
- Never Knew This Kind of Hurt Before: The Bluesway Sessions (Charly, 1988) compilation
- Rockin' L.A. (Fantasy, 1989)
- Live (At Condon's, New York) (Who's Who in Jazz, 1990)
- As Blue As They Can Be with Richard "Groove" Holmes (Who's Who in Jazz, 1991)
- Jay's Blues (The Complete Federal Sessions) (Charly R&B, 1991) compilation
- Blowin' in from Kansas City (Flair/Virgin, 1991) compilation
- Call My Baby (Night Train International, 1991) compilation
- Live at the Notodden Blues Festival with Robben Ford (Blue Rock'it, 1992)
- The Blues, the Whole Blues and Nothing But the Blues (Indigo, 1993)
- Ain't Nobody's Business (The Blues Collection) (Orbis, 1992) compilation
- Live at the Mint with Robben Ford (On The Spot/Private Music, 1994 [1996])
- Cold Blooded Boogie (Night Train International, 1995) compilation
- Spoon's Blues (Stony Plain, 1995)
- Jimmy Witherspoon with the Junior Mance Trio (Stony Plain, 1997) previously unreleased live recording from 1969
- Tougher Than Tough (Blue Moon, 1997) reissue of At the Renaissance
- Jazz Me Blues: The Best of Jimmy Witherspoon (Prestige, 1998) compilation
- Jimmy Witherspoon with the Duke Robillard Band (Stony Plain, 2000)
- Spoon Meets Pao with Eugene Pao (Eastside, 2002) recorded 1990
- Urban Blues Singing Legend (1945-1953) (JSP [4-CD set], 2006) compilation
- Live at the 1972 Monterey Jazz Festival with Robben Ford (Monterey Jazz Festival/Concord, 2008)
- Ain't Nobody's Business (The Singles Collection 1945-1953) (Acrobat [3-CD set], 2024) compilation
- Jump Blues Live 1972 with Robben Ford (Liberation Hall, 2025)

=== Chart singles ===
Year	Single	Chart Positions	
Year	Single	US Pop	US R&B
1949	"Ain't Nobody's Business (Parts 1 & 2)" (Supreme)	—	1
1949	"In the Evening (When the Sun Goes Down)" (Supreme)	—	5
1949	"No Rollin' Blues" (Modern)	—	4
1949	"Big Fine Girl" (Modern)	—	4
1952	"The Wind is Blowin'" (Modern)	—	7
1965	"You're Next" (Prestige)	98	—
1975	"Love is a Five Letter Word" (Capitol)	—	31

=== Filmography/DVDs ===
- 2000: Jazz Casual: Jimmy Witherspoon & Ben Webster, from a 1962 Jazz Casual appearance (Jazz Casual/Idem) reissued in: Jazz Casual: Jimmy Witherspoon/Jimmy Rushing [2003]
- 2003: 20th Century Jazz Masters: Mel Tormé/Jimmy Witherspoon/Carmen McRae/Lambert, Hendricks & Bavan
- 2009: Jimmy Witherspoon: Goin' Down Blues with Marshal Royal and John Collins
