= Jay McShann =

American jazz bandleader, pianist, and singer (1916–2006)

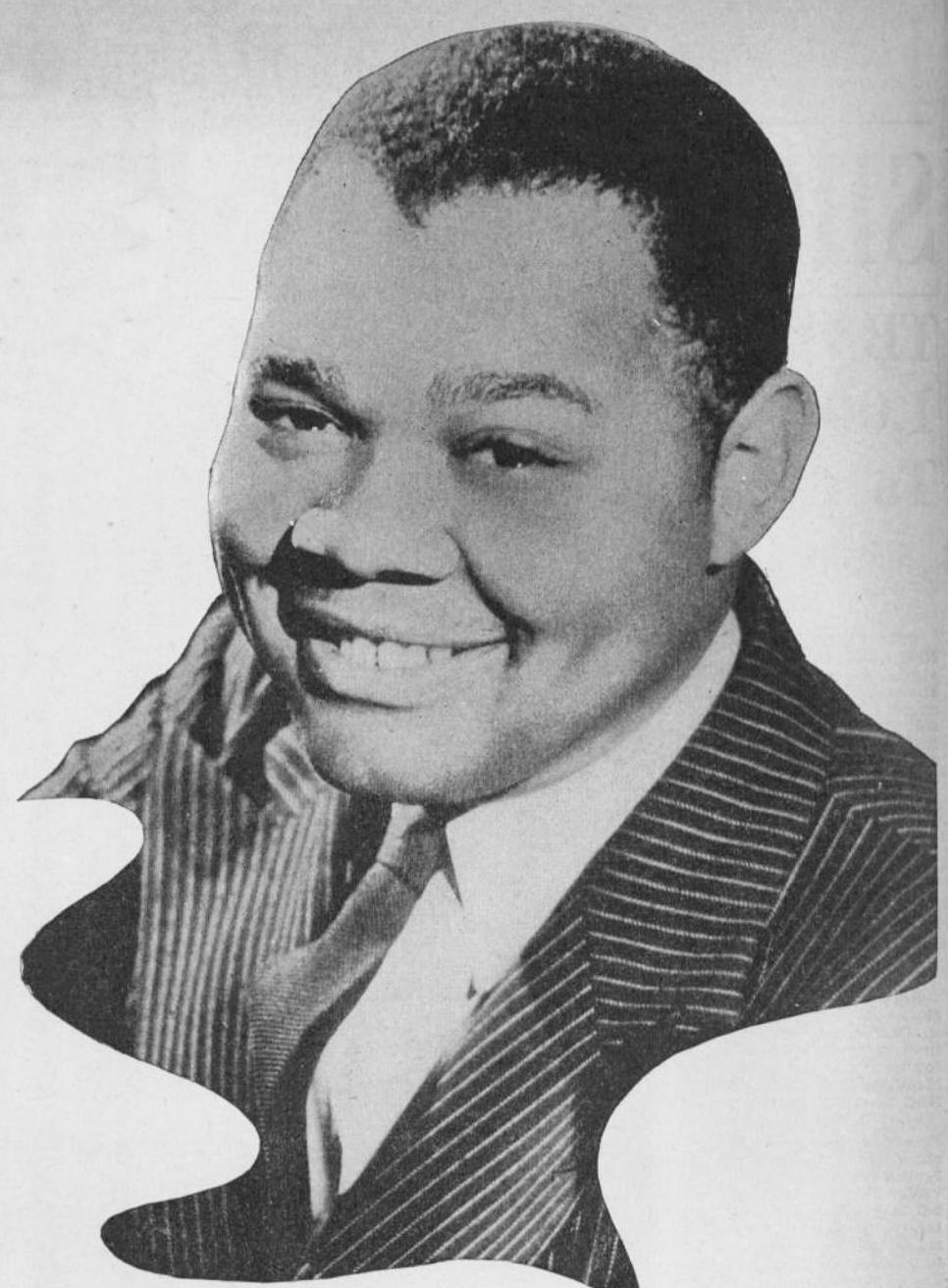
- McShann in a 1944 advertisement

Background information
- Also known as: Hootie
- Born: James Columbus McShann; January 12, 1916; Muskogee, Oklahoma, U.S.
- Died: December 7, 2006 (aged 90) Kansas City, Missouri, U.S.
- Genres: Blues; swing; jazz; jump blues
- Occupations: Musician; bandleader; composer
- Instruments: Vocals; piano
- Years active: 1931–2006
- Labels: Vee-Jay; Sackville; Black & Blue; Chiaroscuro

James Columbus "Jay" McShann (January 12, 1916 – December 7, 2006) was an American jazz pianist, vocalist, composer, and bandleader. He led bands in Kansas City, Missouri, that included Charlie Parker, Bernard Anderson, Walter Brown, and Ben Webster.

== Early life and education ==
McShann was born in Muskogee, Oklahoma, and was nicknamed Hootie. During his youth, he taught himself how to play the piano through observing his sister's piano lessons and trying to practice tunes he heard off the radio. He was also heavily influenced by late-night broadcasts of pianist Earl Hines from Chicago's Grand Terrace Cafe: "When Fatha [Hines] went off the air, I went to bed". He began working as a professional musician in 1931 at the age of 15, performing around Tulsa, Oklahoma, and neighboring Arkansas.

== Career ==
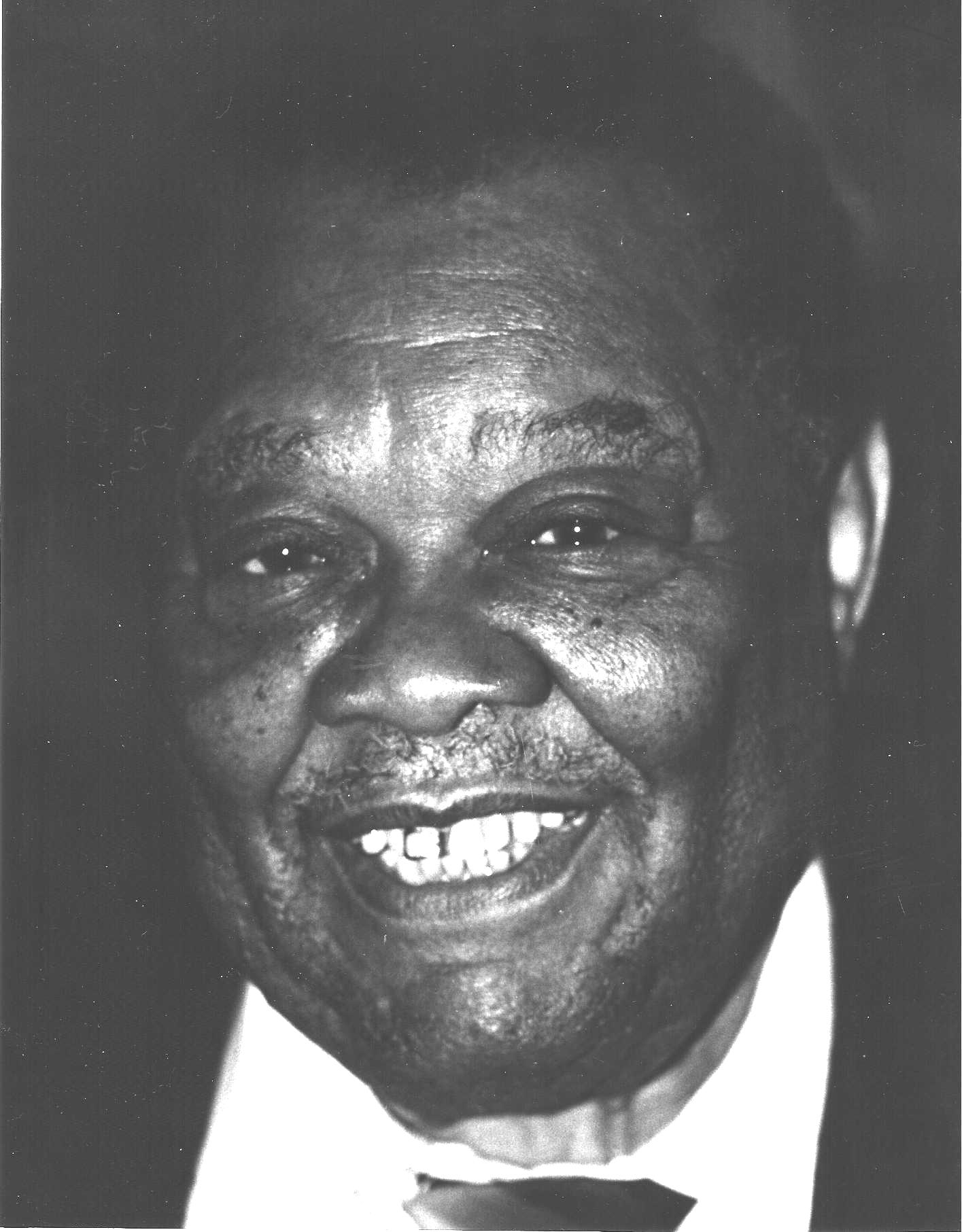
McShann at the Edinburgh Jazz Festival, c. 1995

=== 1936–1944 ===
McShann moved to Kansas City, Missouri, in 1936, and set up his own big band, which variously featured Charlie Parker (1937–42), Al Hibbler, Ben Webster, Paul Quinichette, Bernard Anderson, Gene Ramey, Jimmy Coe, Gus Johnson (1938–43), Harold "Doc" West, Earl Coleman, Walter Brown, and Jimmy Witherspoon, among others. His first recordings were all with Charlie Parker, the first as the Jay McShann Orchestra, on August 9, 1940.

The band played both swing and blues numbers, but played blues on most of its records; its most popular recording was "Confessin' the Blues" with Walter Brown on vocals. The group disbanded when McShann was drafted into the Army in 1944. After his return two years later, he found that small groups were now taking the place of big bands in the jazz scene.

McShann told the Associated Press in 2003, "You'd hear some cat play, and somebody would say, 'This cat, he sounds like he's from Kansas City.' It was Kansas City Style. They knew it on the East Coast. They knew it on the West Coast. They knew it up North, and they knew it down South."

=== 1945–2006 ===
After World War II, McShann began to lead small groups featuring the blues shouter Jimmy Witherspoon. Witherspoon began to record with McShann in 1945, and, fronting McShann's band, he had a hit in 1949 with "Ain't Nobody's Business". As well as writing much material, Witherspoon continued recording with McShann's band, which also featured Ben Webster. McShann had a modern rhythm and blues hit with "Hands Off", featuring a vocal by Priscilla Bowman, in 1955.

In the late 1960s, McShann often performed as a singer as well as a pianist, often with violinist Claude Williams. He continued recording and touring through the 1990s. Well into his 80s, McShann still performed occasionally, particularly in the Kansas City area and Toronto, Ontario, where he made his last recording, Hootie Blues, in February 2001, after a recording career of 61 years. In 1979, he appeared prominently in The Last of the Blue Devils, a documentary film about Kansas City jazz.

One of McShann's favorite stories to tell was how band member and friend Charlie Parker got his nickname "Bird". During their drive to a gig in Nebraska with a car full of musicians, the driver of the car accidentally hit a chicken. According to McShann, Parker requested the driver turn around so he could get the bird, and sat with it in the backseat of the car all the way to Lincoln. Once they arrived, he asked the keeper of the home they were staying in to cook it up for him.

McShann died on December 7, 2006, in Kansas City, Missouri, at the age of 90.

== Awards and honors ==
- Member, Oklahoma Music Hall of Fame, 1998
- Member, Blues Hall of Fame
- Member, Oklahoma Jazz Hall of Fame, 1989
- Pioneer Award, Rhythm and Blues Foundation
- Grammy nomination, Best Large Jazz Ensemble Performance, Paris All-Star Blues (A Tribute to Charlie Parker), 1991
- Grammy nomination, Best Traditional Blues Album, Goin' to Kansas City, 2003
- American Jazz Masters Grant from the National Endowment for the Arts, 1986

== Discography ==
=== As leader ===
- Kansas City Memories (Decca [10″] DL-5503, 1955)
- Goin' to Kansas City Blues with Jimmy Witherspoon (RCA Victor LPM-1639, 1957)
- McShann's Piano (Capitol T-2645, 1966)
- Confessin' the Blues (Black & Blue 33.022, 1970; Classic Jazz CJ-128, 1978)
- Going to Kansas City (Master Jazz MJR-8113, 1972; New World NW-358, 1987)
- Jumpin' the Blues with Milt Buckner (Black & Blue 33.039, 1972)
- The Man from Muskogee with Claude Williams (Sackville 3005, 1973)
- Kansas City Memories (Black & Blue 33.057, 1973)
- The Band That Jumps the Blues! (Black Lion BLP-30144, 1973)
- Early Bird with Charlie Parker (Spotlite [UK] SPJ-120, 1973; Stash STCD-542, 1991)
- Vine Street Boogie (Black Lion BLP-30169, 1974)
- Kansas City Joys with Buddy Tate and Paul Quinichette (Sonet SNTF-716, 1976)
- Crazy Legs & Friday Strut with Buddy Tate (Sackville 3011, 1977)
- Kansas City on My Mind (Black & Blue 33.108, 1977)
- The Last of the Blue Devils (Atlantic SD-8800, 1978)
- A Tribute to Fats Waller (Sackville 3019, 1978)
- Kansas City Hustle (Sackville 3021, 1978)
- The Big Apple Bash (Atlantic SD-8804, 1979)
- Tuxedo Junction with Don Thompson (Sackville 3025, 1980)
- Last of the Whorehouse Piano Players (subtitled: The Original Sessions) with Ralph Sutton (Chaz Jazz CJ-103/CJ-104, 1980; CD reissue: Chiaroscuro CRD-206, 1992)
- Saturday Night Function with the Sackville All-Stars (Sackville 3028, 1981)
- Best of Friends with Al Casey (JSP 1051, 1982)
- After Hours (Storyville SLP-4024, 1982)
- The Early Bird Charlie Parker (1941–1943) (MCA "Jazz Heritage series" 1338, 1982)
- Blowin' in from K.C. with Joe Thomas (Uptown UP-27.12, 1983)
- Just a Lucky So and So (Sackville 3035, 1984)
- Live in France with Eddie "Cleanhead" Vinson (Black & Blue 33.304, 1984)
- Live in France, Vol. 2 with Eddie "Cleanhead" Vinson (Black & Blue 33.309, 1984)
- Roll 'Em (Black and Blue 233022, 1987) – CD reissue of Black & Blue 33.022
- Paris All-Star Blues: A Tribute to Charlie Parker (MusicMasters 5052, Limelight [UK] 820 833, Jazz Heritage 522804, 1991)
- Blue Pianos with Axel Zwingenberger (Vagabond VRLP-8.91017, 1991)
- Stride Piano Summit with Dick Hyman and Ralph Sutton (Milestone 9189, 1991)
- Jimmy Witherspoon & Jay McShann (Black Lion BLCD-760173, 1992) – compilation
- The Missouri Connection with John Hicks (Reservoir RSRCD-124, 1993)
- Some Blues (Chiaroscuro CRD-320, 1993)
- Airmail Special (Sackville 3040, 1994)
- Swingmatism with Don Thompson and Archie Alleyne (Sackville 3046, 1994)
- Piano Playhouse: Complete Swing Time and Supreme Sessions (1947–1950) (Night Train International NTICD-7021, 1996) – compilation
- Swing The Boogie! with Axel Zwingenberger (Vagabond VRCD 8.96021, 1996)
- Hootie's Jumpin' Blues with Duke Robillard (Stony Plain SPCD-1237, 1997)
- Jazz and Blues on Marians' Records with Milt Hinton, Buddy Tate, J. C. Heard, and Carrie Smith (Marians' Records 198292, 1997)
- My Baby with the Black Dress On (Chiaroscuro CRD-345, 1998)
- Havin' Fun with Major Holley (Sackville SKCD2-2047, 1998) – recorded 1986
- Still Jumpin' the Blues with Duke Robillard and Maria Muldaur (Stony Plain SPCD-1254, 1999)
- What a Wonderful World (Groove Note GRV-1005, 1999)
- Hootie! (Chiaroscuro CRD-357, 2000) – recorded 1997
- Hot Biscuits: The Essential Jay McShann 1941–1949 (Indigo [UK] IGOCD-2524, 2002) – compilation
- Jumpin' the Blues: Jay McShann and His Orchestra (1940–1951) (Proper PVCD-131, 2003) – compilation/2-CD set
- Goin' to Kansas City with Duke Robillard (Stony Plain SPCD-1286, 2003)
- Jumpin' the Blues (The Definitive Black & Blue Sessions) with Tiny Grimes (Black & Blue BB-979.2, 2004)
- Solos & Duets (Sackville 5012, 2005) – 3-LPs on 2-CDs/reissues: A Tribute to Fats Waller, Kansas City Hustle, Tuxedo Junction
- Hootie Blues (Stony Plain SPCD-1315, 2006) – recorded 2001
- A Rockin' Good Way (1955–1959) with Priscilla Bowman (Jasmine JASMCD-3121, 2019) – compilation
- Hootie Swings the Blues 1941–1956 (Acrobat ACTRCD-9169, 2025) – compilation / 3-CD set

=== As sideman ===
With Clarence "Gatemouth" Brown

- Cold Strange (Black & Blue, 1977)
- More Stuff (Black & Blue, 1985)
- Pressure Cooker (Alligator, 1985)
- Just Got Lucky (The Blues Collection) (Orbis, 1993) – compilation

With others

- Walter Brown, Confessin' the Blues (Affinity, 1981) – compilation
- Al Casey, Jumpin' with Al (Black & Blue, 1974)
- Slim Gaillard, Anytime, Anyplace, Anywhere! (Hep [UK], 1983)
- Jim Galloway, Thou Swell (Sackville, 1981)
- Jim Galloway, Kansas City Nights (Sackville, 1993)
- Tiny Grimes, Tiny Grimes (Black & Blue, 1970)
- Tiny Grimes, Some Groovy Fours (Black & Blue, 1996) – two tracks on the CD reissue
- Helen Humes, Helen Comes Back (Black & Blue, 1973)
- Helen Humes, On the Sunny Side of the Street (Black Lion, 1975)
- Julia Lee, Tonight's the Night (Charly, 1982) compilation
- Duke Robillard, The Acoustic Blues & Roots of Duke Robillard (Stony Plain, 2015)
- Eddie "Cleanhead" Vinson, Kidney Stew Is Fine (Delmark, 1969)
- T-Bone Walker, Feelin' the Blues (Black & Blue, 1999) – three tracks on the CD reissue
- Jackie Washington, Keeping Out of Mischief (Borealis, 1995)
- Claude Williams, Fiddler's Dream (Black & Blue, 1977)
