= Walter Brown (singer) =

American songwriter and blues shouter

Walter Brown (August 17, 1917 – June 1956) was an American blues shouter who sang with Jay McShann's band in the 1940s and co-wrote their biggest hit, "Confessin' the Blues".

Brown was born in Dallas, Texas. He joined McShann's orchestra, which also included the saxophonist Charlie Parker, in 1941. Brown sang on some of the band's most successful recordings, including "Confessin' the Blues" and "Hootie Blues", before leaving to be replaced by Jimmy Witherspoon. In 1947 he recorded with the Tiny Grimes Sextet, which led to a version of the hit "Open the Door, Richard!". Most radio stations refused to play the song, as the lyrics were considered obscene and it was soon withdrawn.

Brown's subsequent solo singing career was unsuccessful, although he recorded for the King, Signature and Mercury labels, and he briefly reunited with McShann for recording sessions in 1949. His last two recordings were completed in Houston in 1951 and released on the Peacock label.

Brown died in June 1956 in Lawton, Oklahoma, as a result of drug addiction.

== See also ==
- List of blues musicians
- List of people from Kansas City
