= Hipster (1940s subculture) =

American jazz subculture

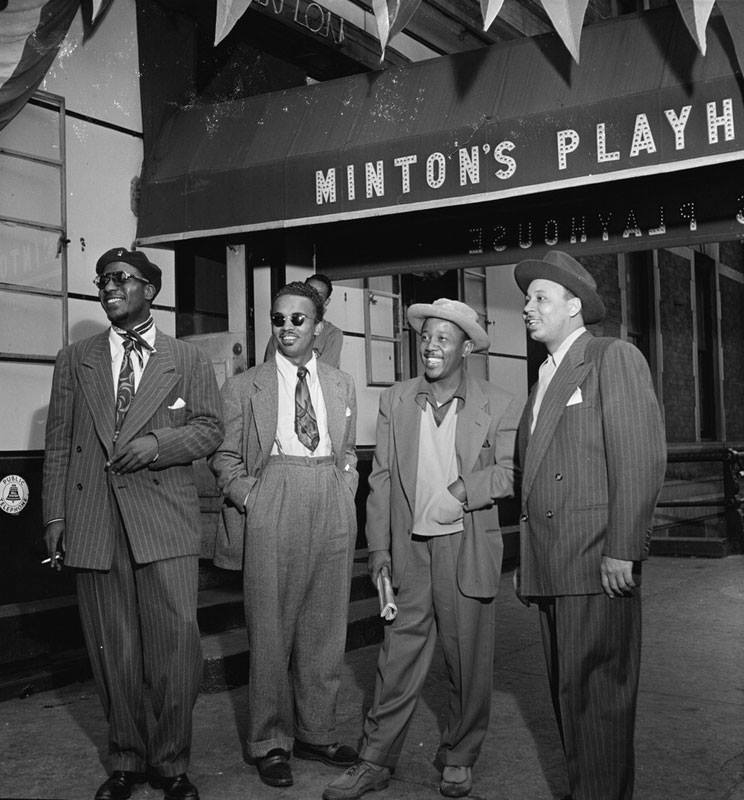
Thelonious Monk, Howard McGhee, Roy Eldridge, and Teddy Hill, in front of Minton's Playhouse in New York City, wearing zoot suits

The terms hipster or hepcat, as used in the 1940s, referred to aficionados of jump blues and jazz, in particular bebop, which became popular in the early 1940s and later into the 1950s, being associated with rock and roll and rhythm and blues fans or artists. The hipster subculture adopted the lifestyle of the jazz musician, including some or all of the following features: Conk hairstyles, loose fitting or oversize suits with loud colors, jive talk slang, use of tobacco, cannabis, and other recreational drugs, relaxed attitude, love for jazz or jump blues music, and styles of swing dancing, especially Lindy hop.

The zoot suit was the popular style amongst hepcats. It incorporated baggy or oversize suits sometimes with loud colors, thick chalk stripes, floppy hats, and long watch chains. Many zoot suiters would often wear a fedora or pork pie hat, color-coordinated with the suit. Occasionally, they would have a long feather on the fedora or pork pie hat as decoration.

When conversing, hepcats would communicate in jive talk. Jive talk (also known as Harlem jive or simply Jive) is an African-American Vernacular English slang or vocabulary that was developed in urban African American communities. It was adopted more widely in African-American society and then later into the mainstream. This style of English dialect peaked in the 1940s.

In 1938, jazz bandleader and singer Cab Calloway published a small glossary, "Hepster's Dictionary," the first dictionary by an African-American. This dictionary was specified for jive talk and other phrases that were popular amongst African-American youth.

== History ==
The words hep and hip are of uncertain origin, with numerous competing theories being proposed. In the early days of jazz, musicians were using the hep variant to describe anybody who was "in the know" about an emerging, mostly African-American subculture, which revolved around jazz. They and their fans were known as hepcats. In 1938, the word hepster was used by bandleader Cab Calloway in the title of his dictionary, Cab Calloway's Cat-ologue: A "Hepster's" Dictionary, which defines hep cat as "a guy who knows all the answers, understands jive". British author and poet Lemn Sissay remarked that "Cab Calloway was taking ownership of language for a people who, just a few generations before, had their own languages taken away." By the late 1930s, with the rise of swing, hep began to be used commonly in mainstream "square" culture, so by the 1940s hip rose in popularity among jazz musicians, to replace hep. In 1944, pianist Harry Gibson modified hepcat to hipster in his short glossary "For Characters Who Don't Dig Jive Talk", published in 1944 with the album Boogie Woogie In Blue, featuring the self-titled hit "Handsome Harry the Hipster". The entry for hipsters defined them as "characters who like hot jazz." In 1947, Gibson sought to clarify the switch in the record "It Ain't Hep" which musically describes the difference between the two terms. Initially, hipsters were usually middle-class European American youths seeking to emulate the lifestyle of the largely African-American jazz musicians they followed. In The Jazz Scene (1959), the British historian and social theorist Eric Hobsbawm (originally writing under the pen name Francis Newton) described hipster language—i.e., "jive-talk or hipster-talk"—as "an argot or cant designed to set the group apart from outsiders". This group crucially included White jazz musicians such as Benny Goodman, Al Cohn, Gerry Mulligan, Stan Getz, Mezz Mezzrow, Barney Kessel, Doc Pomus, Bing Crosby, Bob Hope, Frank Sinatra, Dean Martin, Jerry Lewis, Joey Bishop, Perry Como, Tony Bennett, Chet Baker, and Gene Krupa who ought to be counted as some of the "true" original hipsters as they were instrumental in turning the White American audience onto jazz and its underground culture in the 1930s and 1940s. Clarinetist Artie Shaw described singer Bing Crosby as "the first hip white person born in the United States."

Hipsters were more interested in bebop and "hot" jazz than they were in swing, which by the late 1940s was becoming old-fashioned and watered down by "squares" like Lawrence Welk, Guy Lombardo and Robert Coates. In the 1940s, White youth began to frequent Black communities for their music and dance. These first youths diverged from the mainstream due to their new philosophies of racial diversity and their exploratory sexual nature and drug habits. The drug of choice was marijuana, and many hipster slang terms were dedicated to the substance. The hipster subculture rapidly expanded, and after World War II, a burgeoning literary scene grew up around it. In 1957, the American writer and adventurer Jack Kerouac described hipsters as "rising and roaming America, bumming and hitchhiking everywhere [as] characters of a special spirituality". Toward the beginning of his poem Howl, the Jewish-American Beatnik poet Allen Ginsberg mentioned "angelheaded hipsters burning for the ancient heavenly connection to the starry dynamo in the machinery of night". In his 1957 essay The White Negro, the American novelist and journalist Norman Mailer characterized hipsters as American existentialists, living a life surrounded by death—annihilated by the atomic war or strangled by social conformity—and electing instead to "divorce [themselves] from society, to exist without roots, to set out on that uncharted journey into the rebellious imperatives of the self".

== Racial role reversal ==
The new philosophy of racial role reversal was transcribed by many popular hipster authors of the time. Norman Mailer's 1957 pamphlet, entitled The White Negro, has become the paradigmatic example of hipster ideology. Mailer described the hipsters as individuals "with a middle-class background (who) attempt to put down their whiteness and adopt what they believe is the carefree, spontaneous, cool lifestyle of Negro hipsters: their manner of speaking and language, their use of milder narcotics, their appreciation of jazz and the blues, and their supposed concern with the good orgasm." In a nod to Mailer's discussion of hipsterism, the United States' Cold War deployments of African-American culture and personalities for the purposes of public diplomacy has been discussed as "hipster diplomacy".

== See also ==
- Aftermath of World War II
- Beatnik
- Bohemianism
- Cannabis culture
- Cultural appropriation
- Etymology of hippie
- Generation Gap
- Greatest Generation
- Hipster (contemporary subculture)
- How to Speak Hip
- Wigger
