= Hip (slang) =

Modern word for 'cool'

Hip is a slang for fashionably current and in the know. To be hip is to have "an attitude, a stance" in opposition to the "unfree world", or to what is square or prude. Being hip is also about being informed about the latest ideas, styles, and developments.

Hip, like cool, does not refer to one specific quality. What is considered hip is continuously changing.

== Origin of term ==
The term hip is recorded in African American Vernacular English (AAVE) in the early 1900s. In the 1930s and 1940s, it had become a common slang term, particularly in the African-American-dominated jazz scene.

The origin of hip remains contested; many proposed etymologies exist, but none is proven. Research and speculation by both amateur and professional etymologists suggest that "hip" is derived from an earlier form hep, but that is disputed. Some writers claim that the terms hip, hep and hepcat derive from the west African Wolof language word hepicat, which means "one who has his eyes open". Professional etymologists generally reject this, tracing the origin of this putative etymology to David Dalby, a scholar of African languages who tentatively suggested the idea in the 1960s. Indeed, the linguist Laurence R. Horn coined the "to cry Wolof" to criticize unsupported etymologies.

Alternative theories trace the word's origins to those who used opium recreationally. Because opium smokers commonly took the drug lying on their sides or on the hip, the term became a coded reference to the practice and because opium smoking was a practice of socially influential trend-setting individuals, the cachet it enjoyed led to the circulation of the term hip by way of a kind of synecdoche. This etymology is rejected by Sheidlower. Slang dictionaries of past centuries give a term hip or hyp meaning melancholy or bored, shortened from the word hypochondriac. This usage, more prevalent around 1800, was virtually extinct by 1900.

== Development ==
The word hip in the sense of "aware, in the know" is first attested in a 1902 cartoon by Tad Dorgan and first appeared in print in a 1904 novel by George Vere Hobart, Jim Hickey, A Story of the One-Night Stands, where an African-American character uses the slang phrase "Are you hip?" Early currency of the term (as the past participle hipped, meaning informed) is further documented in the 1914 novel The Auction Block by Rex Beach "His collection of Napoleana is the finest in this country; he is an authority on French history of that period—in fact, he's as nearly hipped on the subject as a man of his powers can be considered hipped on anything".

After the Second World War, the term moved into general parlance. The English humorist P. G. Wodehouse has his aristocratic narrator, Bertie Wooster, use the term "get hep" in his 1946 novel Joy in the Morning. Jack Kerouac described his mid-century contemporaries as "the new American generation known as the 'Hip' (the Knowing)". In 1947, Harry "The Hipster" Gibson wrote the song "It Ain't Hep" about the switch from hep to hip,

Hey you know there's a lot of talk going around about this hip and hep jive. Lots of people are going around saying "hip." Lots of squares are coming out with "hep." Well the hipster is here to inform you what the jive is all about.

The jive is hip, don't say hep
That's a slip of the lip, let me give you a tip
Don't you ever say hep it ain't hip, NO IT AIN'T
It ain't hip to be loud and wrong
Just because you're feeling strong
You try too hard to make a hit
And every time you do you tip your mitt
It ain't hip to blow your top
The only thing you say is mop, mop, mop
Keep cool fool, like a fish in the pool
That's the golden rule at the Hipster school
You find yourself talking too much
Then you know you're off the track
That's the stuff you got to watch
Everybody wants to get into the act
It ain't hip to think you're "in there"
Just because of the zooty suit you wear
You can laugh and shout but you better watch out
Cause you don't know what it's all about, man
Man you ain't hip if you don't get hip to this hip and hep jive
Now get it now, look out
Man get hip with the hipster, YEAH!

Got to do it!

The 1936 drama film August Week End uses the term "hip" in dialogue. Norman Mailer, one of the voices of the Hipster-Movement, formulated the content-related interpretation of the terms "hip" and "square" in an essay in 1957 as opposites in attitudes towards life,

Hip - Square / wild - practical / romantic - classic / instinct - logic / Negro - white / inductive - programmatic / the relation - the name / spontaneous - orderly / perverse - pious / midnight - noon / nihilistic - authoritarian / associative - sequential / a question - an answer / obeying the form of the curve - living in the cell of the square / self - society / crooks - cops / free will - determinism.

== See also ==
- Hip hop music
- Etymology of hippie
- Hipster (1940s subculture)
- Hipster (contemporary subculture)
- Square (slang)
- Woke
