= Three Deuces =

Jazz club in New York City (1930s–1940s)

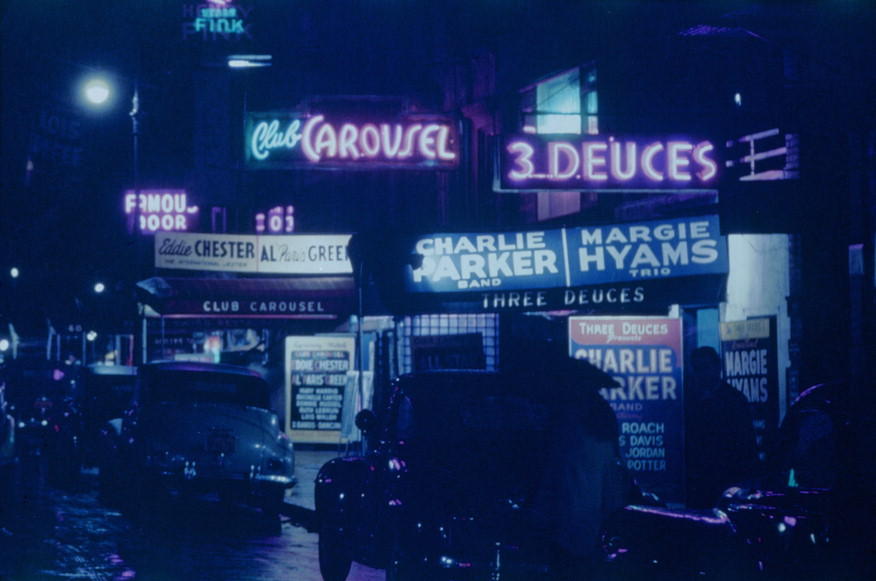
- The Three Deuces's marquee alongside its neighbors on 52nd Street, New York City, c. 1948
- Address: 72 West 52nd Street; New York City; United States
- Type: Jazz club

Construction
- Years active: 1930s–1940s

The Three Deuces was a jazz club located at 72 West 52nd Street in New York City's famed "Swing Street" during the 1930s and 1940s.

== History ==
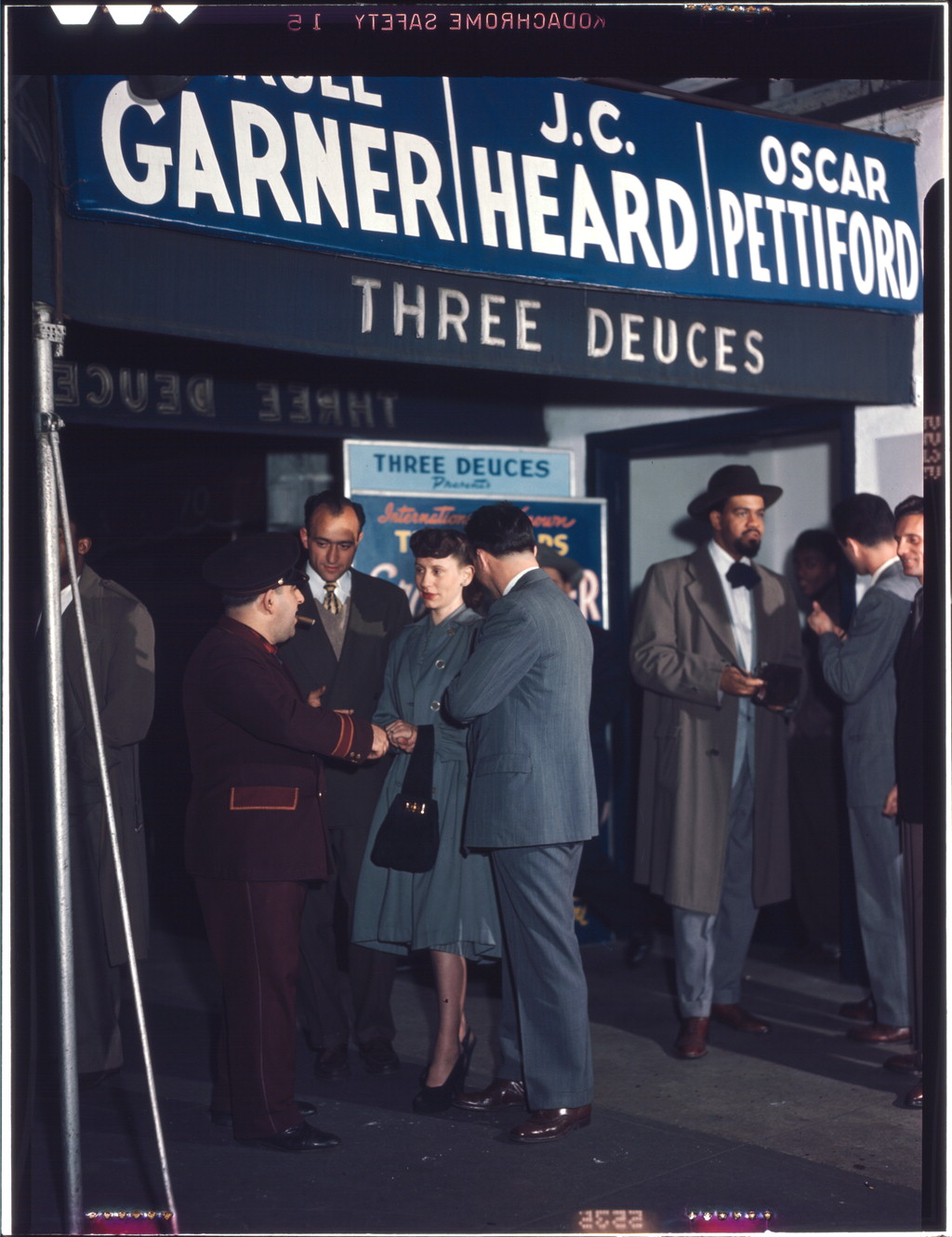
Outside the Three Deuces, c. July 1948. Erroll Garner, J. C. Heard, ad Oscar Pettiford were playing at the club at the time.

In the 1930s and 1940s, the Three Deuces became part of the vibrant jazz scene on 52nd Street. The club was advertised on three-story signs along with the likes of the Onyx Club, Jimmy Ryan's, and the Famous Door, among others.

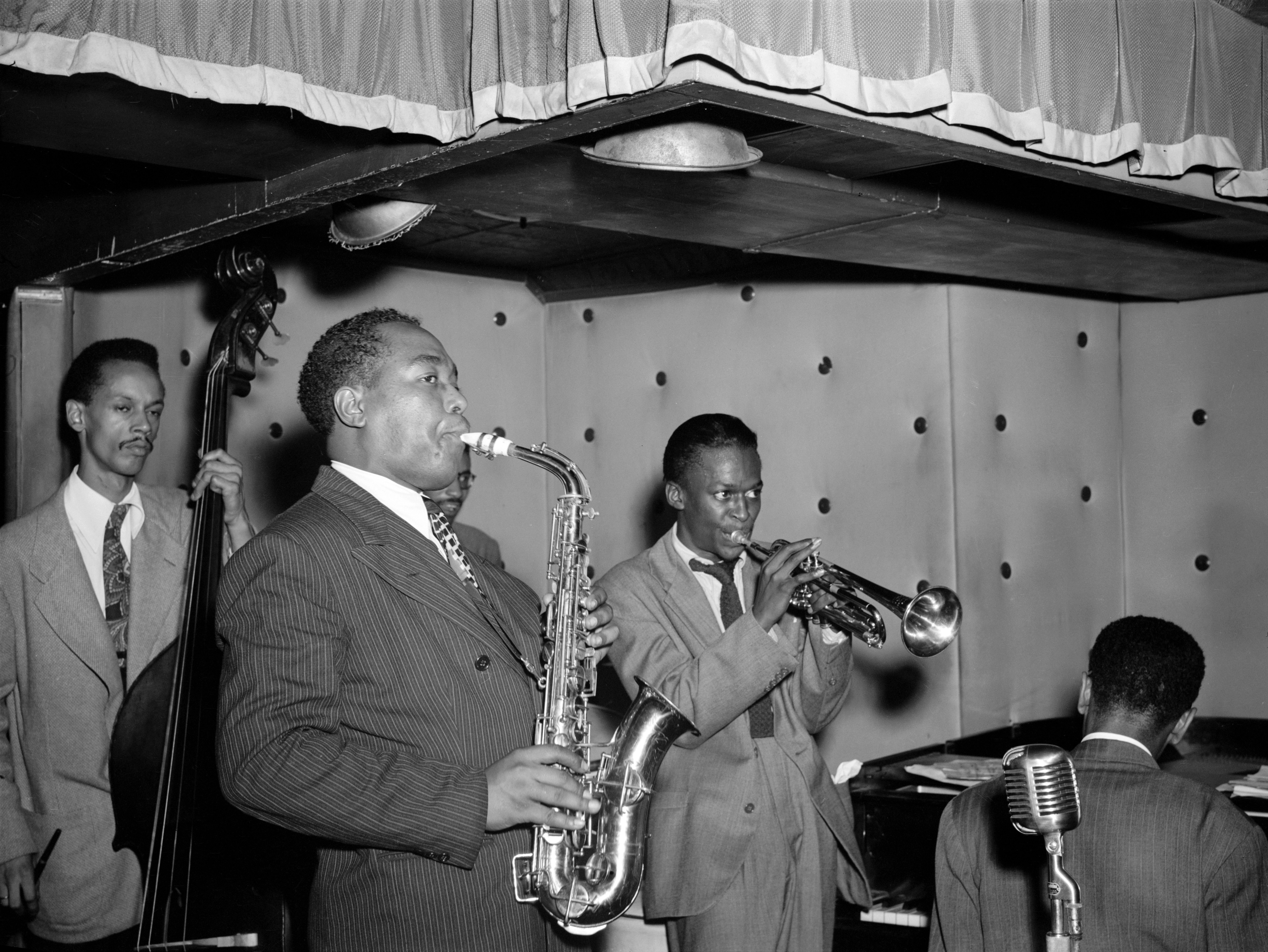
Saxophonist Charlie Parker with (from left) Tommy Potter, Max Roach (occluded), Miles Davis, and Duke Jordan, at the Three Deuces, c. August 1947

The club's basement became a popular venue for jam sessions and performances by emerging bebop artists. The Three Deuces hosted performances by legendary artists such as Charlie Parker, Miles Davis, Max Roach, Charles Mingus, Art Tatum, and Erroll Garner, and has been described as a club where it was "more about sitting and listening to musicians as artists" in comparison to some of the other clubs which also featured dance entertainment.

Roy Eldridge performed at the club between the fall of 1936 and 1938, and recorded an album there, Live At The Three Deuces Club, believed to be from February 1937.

In the early 1940s, the Three Deuces featured a house band that included pianist Hank Kohout, Specs Powell on drums, and bassist Milt Hinton, who backed saxophonists Coleman Hawkins, Ben Webster and Georgie Auld.
