= 52nd Street (Manhattan) =

West-east street in Manhattan, New York

Coordinates: 40°45′27″N 73°58′15″W

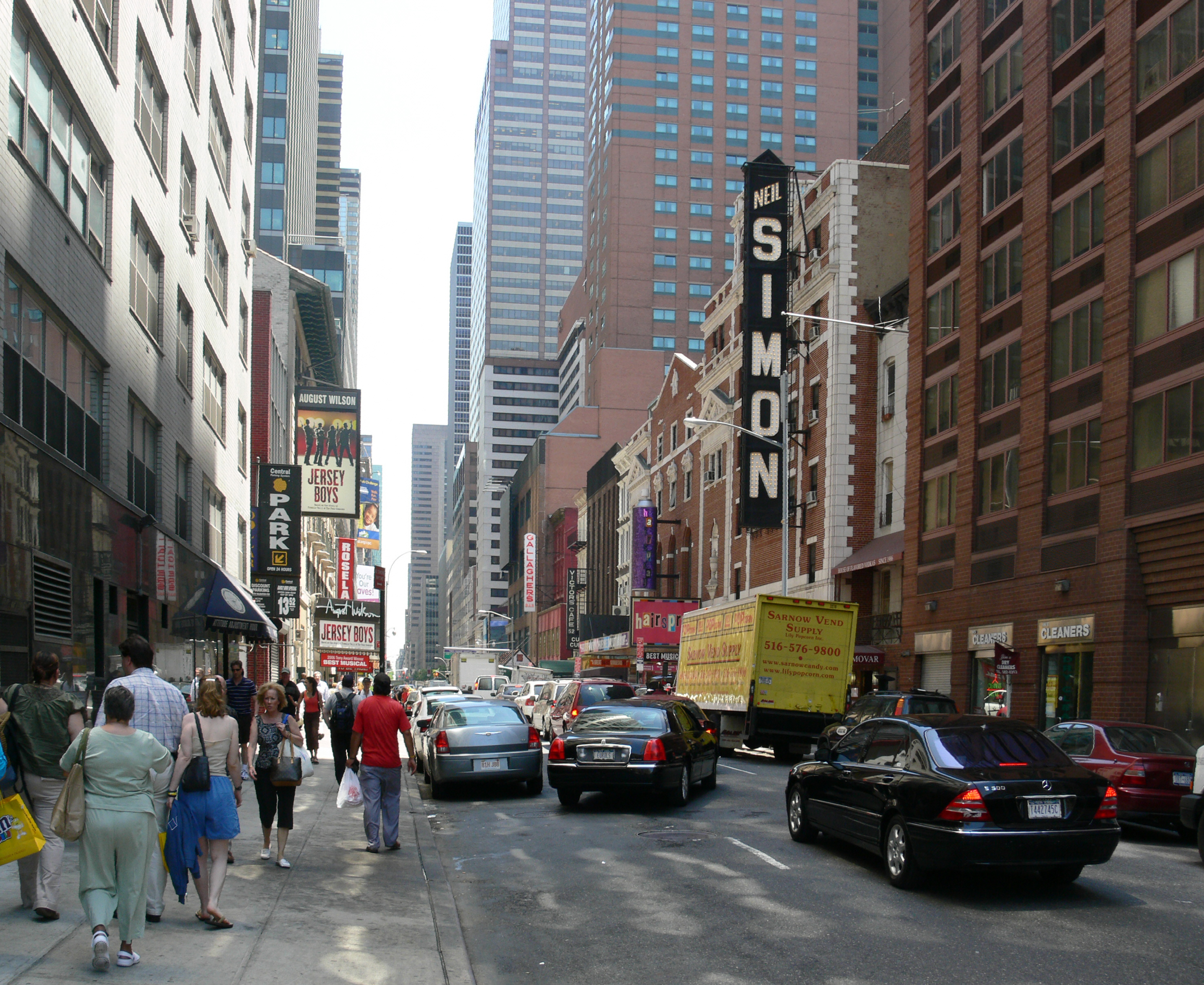
- The theatres of 52nd Street in 2007
- Maintained by: New York City Department of Transportation
- Length: 1.9 mi (3.1 km)
- Location: Manhattan, New York
- West end: NY 9A West Side Highway
- East end: Cul-de-sac east of First Avenue

52nd Street is a 1.9-mile-long (3.1 km) one-way street traveling west to east across Midtown Manhattan, New York City, United States. A short section of it was known as the city's center of jazz performance from the 1930s to the 1950s.

== Jazz center ==
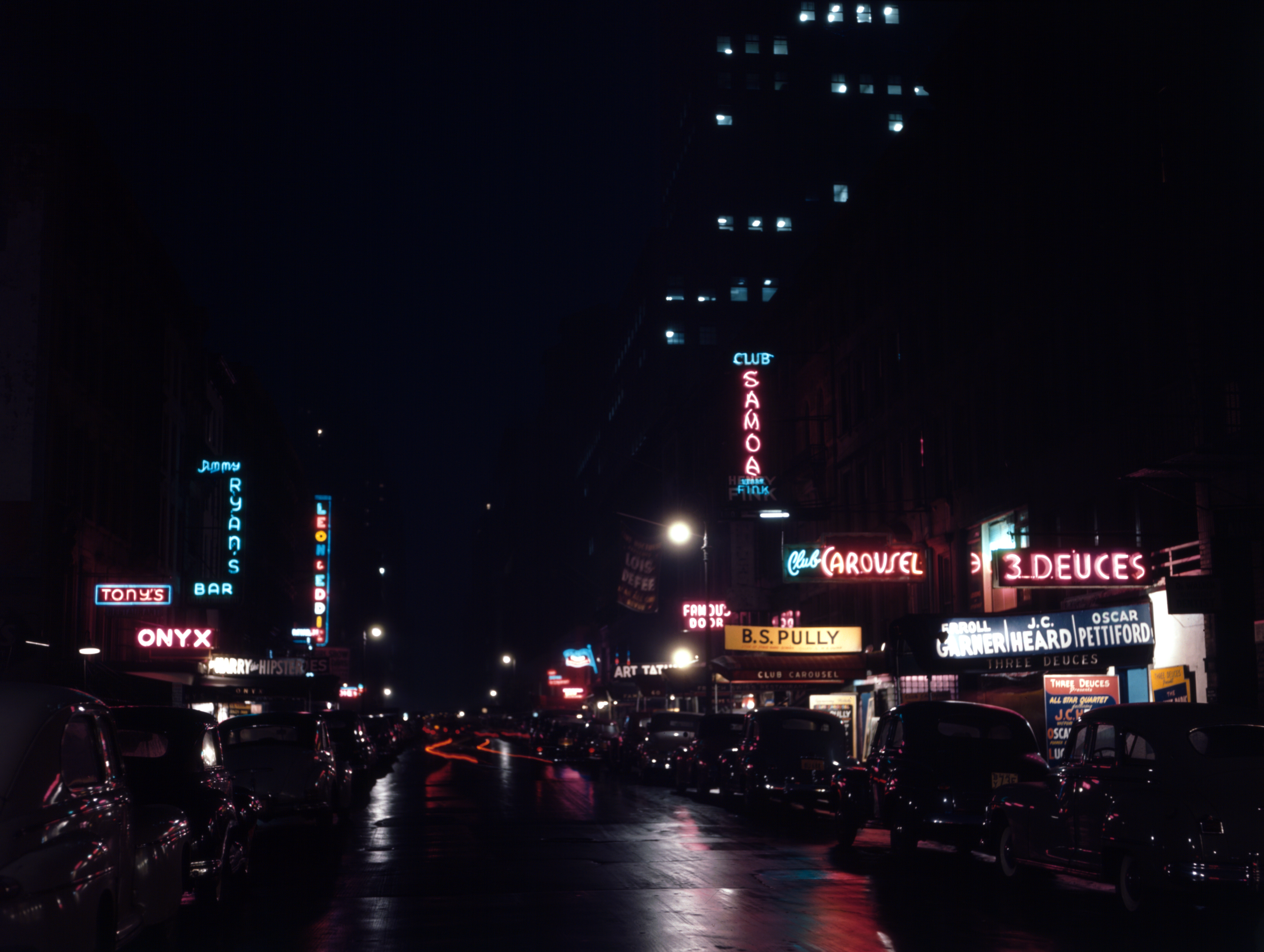
Looking east from 6th Avenue, 52nd Street at night (May 1948); photo by William P. Gottlieb

Following the repeal of Prohibition in 1933, 52nd Street replaced 133rd Street as the "Swing Street" of the city. The blocks of 52nd Street between Fifth and Seventh Avenues became renowned for the abundance of jazz clubs and lively street life. The street was convenient to musicians playing on Broadway and the 'legitimate' nightclubs and was also the site of a CBS studio. Musicians who played for others in the early evening played for themselves on 52nd Street.

From 1930 to the early 1950s, 52nd Street clubs hosted such jazz musicians as Louis Prima, Art Tatum, Fats Waller, Billie Holiday, Trummy Young, Harry Gibson, Nat Jaffe, Dizzy Gillespie, Thelonious Monk, Charlie Parker, Miles Davis, Marian McPartland, Mary Osborne, and many more. Although musicians from all schools performed there, after Minton's Playhouse in uptown Harlem, 52nd Street was the second most important place for the dissemination of bebop. In fact, a tune called "52nd Street Theme" by Thelonious Monk became a bebop anthem and jazz standard.

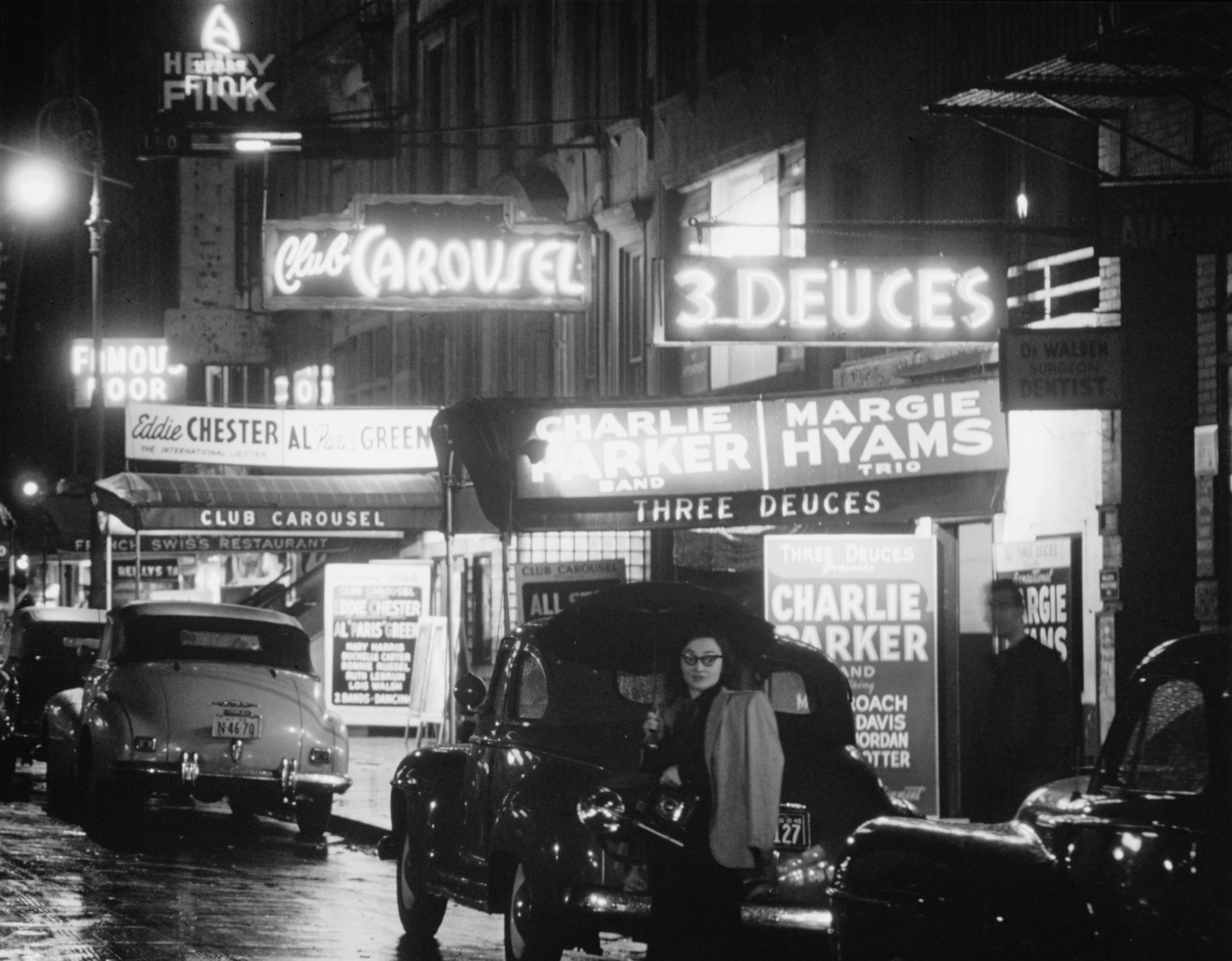
The south side of 52nd Street, between 5th & 6th Avenues – looking east from 6th Avenue (c. 1948); photo by William P. Gottlieb

Virtually every great jazz player and singer of the era performed at clubs:

52nd Street, between 6th & 7th Avenues

- Kelly's Stable, 137 W 52
- The Hickory House, 144 W 52

52nd Street, between 5th & 6th Avenues

- 21 Club, 21 W 52 (1929–2020)
- Leon & Eddie's, 33 W 52
- Famous Door

35 W 52 (Mar 1935–May 1936)
66 W 52 (Dec 1937–Nov 1943)
201 W 52 (Nov 1943–1944)
56 W 52 (1947–1950)
Note: The Cotton Club (unconnected to the defunct club with the same name) opened in 1943 on the site formerly occupied by the Famous Door; the club was initially managed by Russell Carter

- Jimmy Ryan's, 53 W 52 (1934–1962)

154 W 54th (1962–1983)

- Spotlite Club, 56 W 52
- Club Samoa

62 W 52 (1940–1943)
became a strip club in 1943

- The Onyx

35 W 52 (1927–1933) (owned by Joe Helbock)
72 W 52 (1933–1937) (owned by Joe Helbock)
62 W 52 (1937–1939) (owned by Joe Helbock, et al.)
57 W 52 (1942–1949) (unrelated to the original Onyx)
became a strip club in 1949

- Yacht Club, 66 W 52
- Club Downbeat, 66 W 52
- Club Carousel, 66 W 52
- 3 Deuces, 72 W 52

Disc jockey Symphony Sid frequently did live broadcasts from the street which were transmitted across the country.

By the late 1940s, the jazz scene began moving elsewhere around the city and urban renewal began to take hold of the street. By the 1960s, most of the legendary clubs were razed or fell into disrepair. The last jazz club there closed in 1968, though one remains as a restaurant. Today, the street is full of banks, shops, and department stores and shows little trace of its jazz history. The block from 5th to 6th Avenues is formally co-named "Swing Street" and one block west is called "W. C. Handys Place".

The 21 Club was the sole surviving club on 52nd Street that also existed during the 1940s. It closed in 2020. The venue for the original Birdland at 1674 Broadway (between 52nd & 53rd), which came into existence in 1949, is now a strip club. The current Birdland is on 44th Street, between 8th and 9th Avenues.

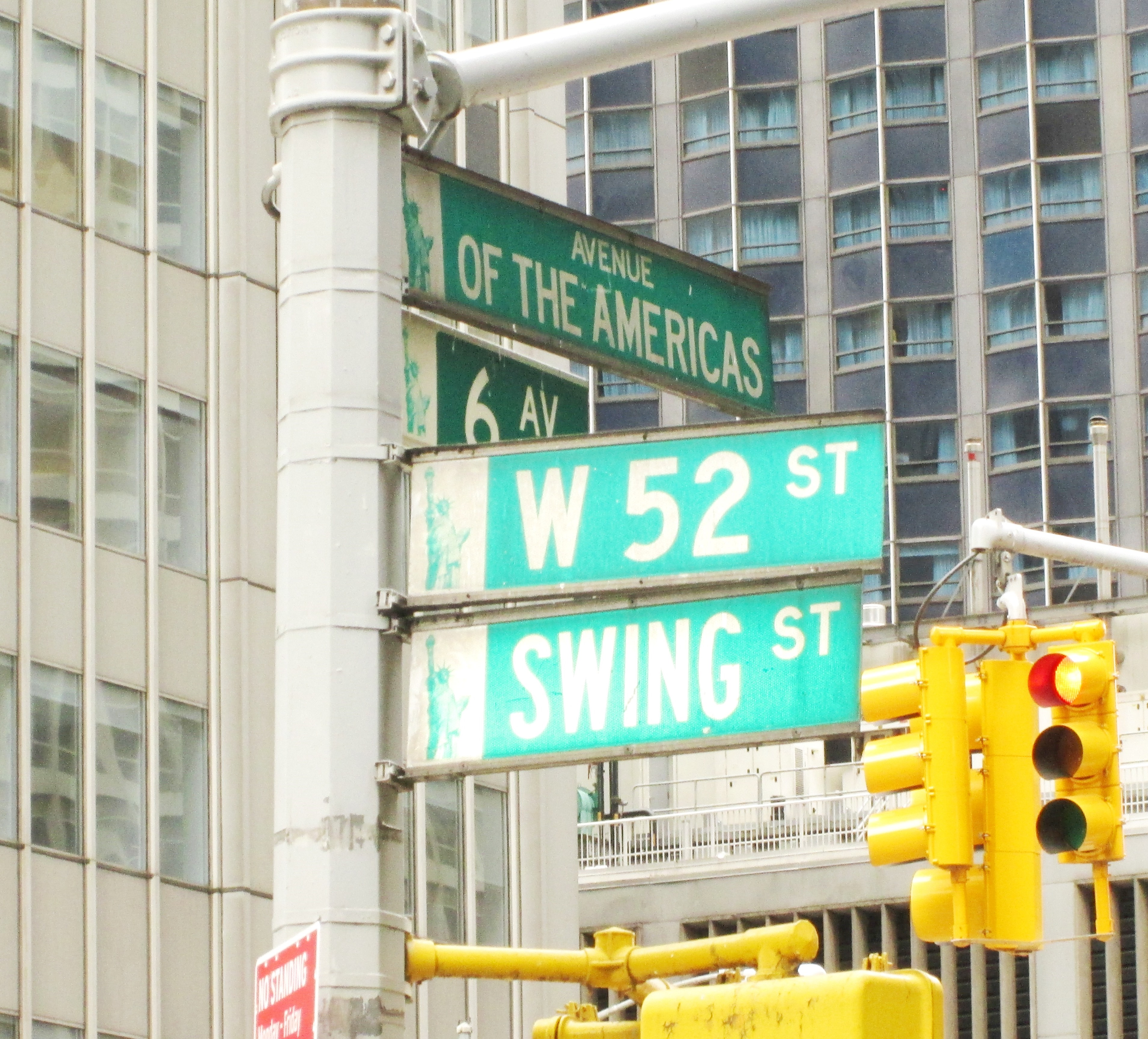
"Swing Street" street sign

== Notable places on 52nd Street ==
This is a list of notable places within one block of 52nd Street.

=== West Side Highway ===
- The route begins at the West Side Highway (New York Route 9A). Opposite the intersection is the New York Passenger Ship Terminal and the Hudson River
- Hustler Club on the south side
- De Witt Clinton Park on the north (the whole west side neighborhood of Clinton derives its name from the park
- Studios of The Daily Show broadcast (south)

=== Eleventh Avenue ===
The section between Eleventh and Tenth Avenues is signed "Joe Hovarth Way" in tribute to Joseph Hovarth (1945–1995) who located the Police Athletic League William J. Duncan Center on the block after moving from its original location. The Duncan Center is named for a patrolman who was shot while chasing a stolen car in the neighborhood on May 17, 1930.

=== Tenth Avenue ===
- Closed Midtown Branch of Saint Vincent's Catholic Medical Center (formerly St. Clares Hospital) (south)

=== Ninth Avenue ===
- The Manhattan School – Public School 35, special ed. (317 West 52nd) (north)
- Radio City Station Post Office (zip code 10019) (south)
- The Link (south), 43-story, 215–unit, glass tower condominium (height = 471 feet), opened in 2007 on site of the S.I.R. (Studio Instrument Rentals, Inc.) building at 310 W 52nd, known as the Palm Gardens Building. S.I.R. occupied the building from 1974 until 2004. Cheetah, the well-known club that had once been at 53rd and Broadway, occupied the Palm Gardens building from 1968 to 1974. Cheetah became a popular Latin-American dance club that helped popularize Salsa to mainstream America.

=== Eighth Avenue ===
- Neil Simon Theatre (south)
- August Wilson Theatre (north)
- Gallagher's Steak House (south)
- Novotel 26-floor, 272 ft (83 m) hotel opened in 1984 (south)
- 1675 Broadway - 35-floor, 485 ft (148 m) office building opened in 1990 (north)

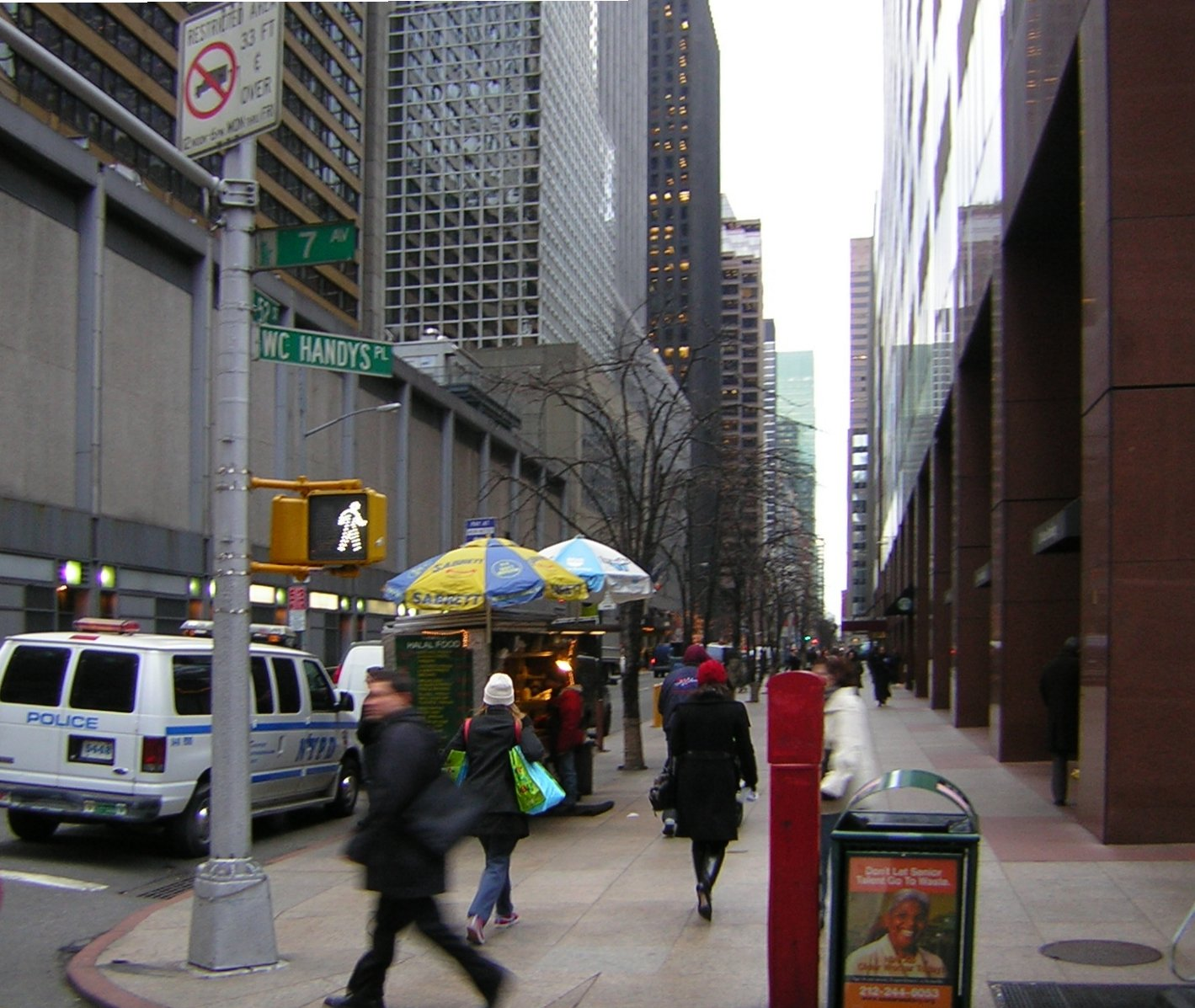
52nd Street between Sixth and Seventh Avenues is "W. C. Handy's Place"

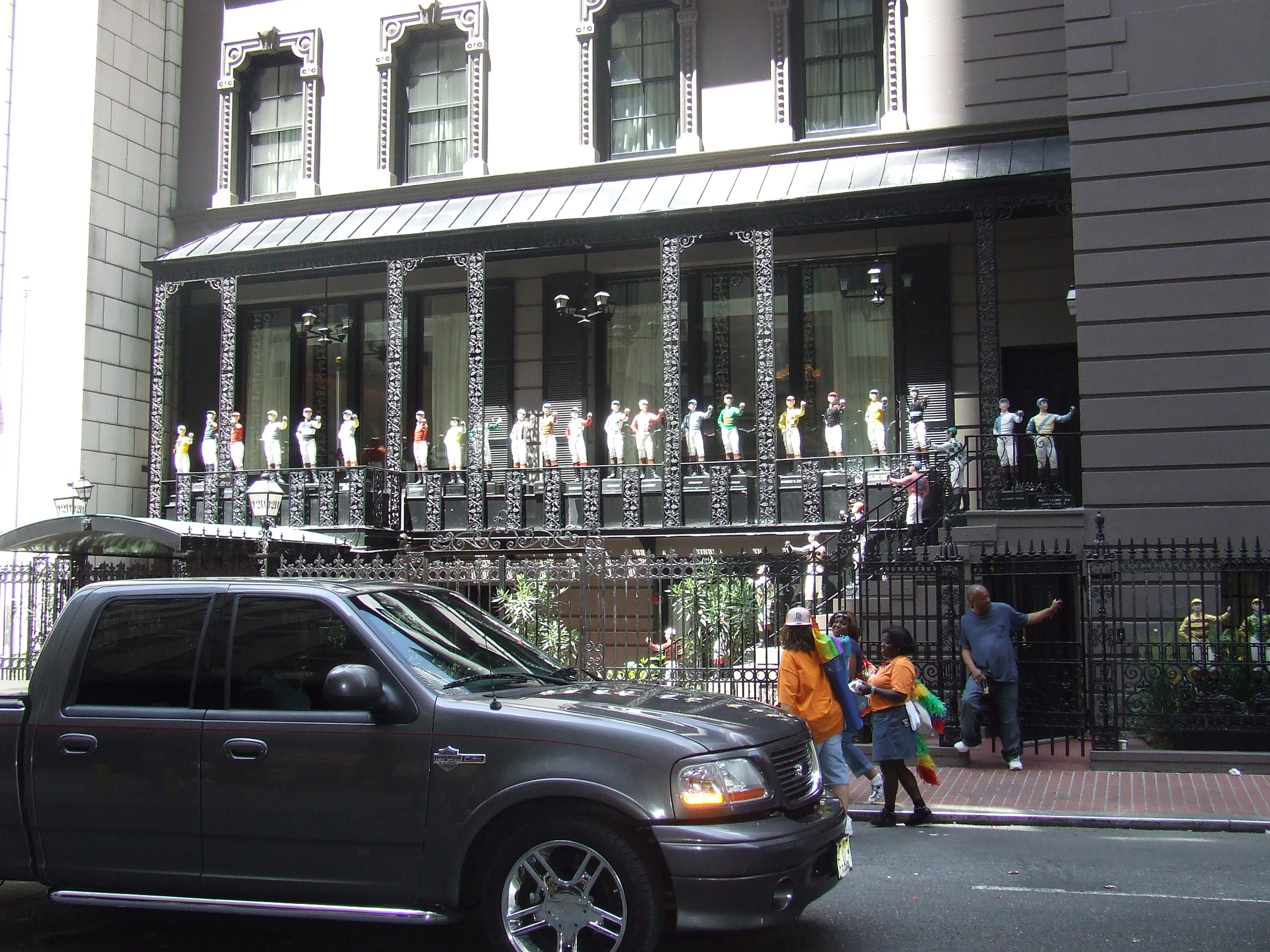
The "21 Club"

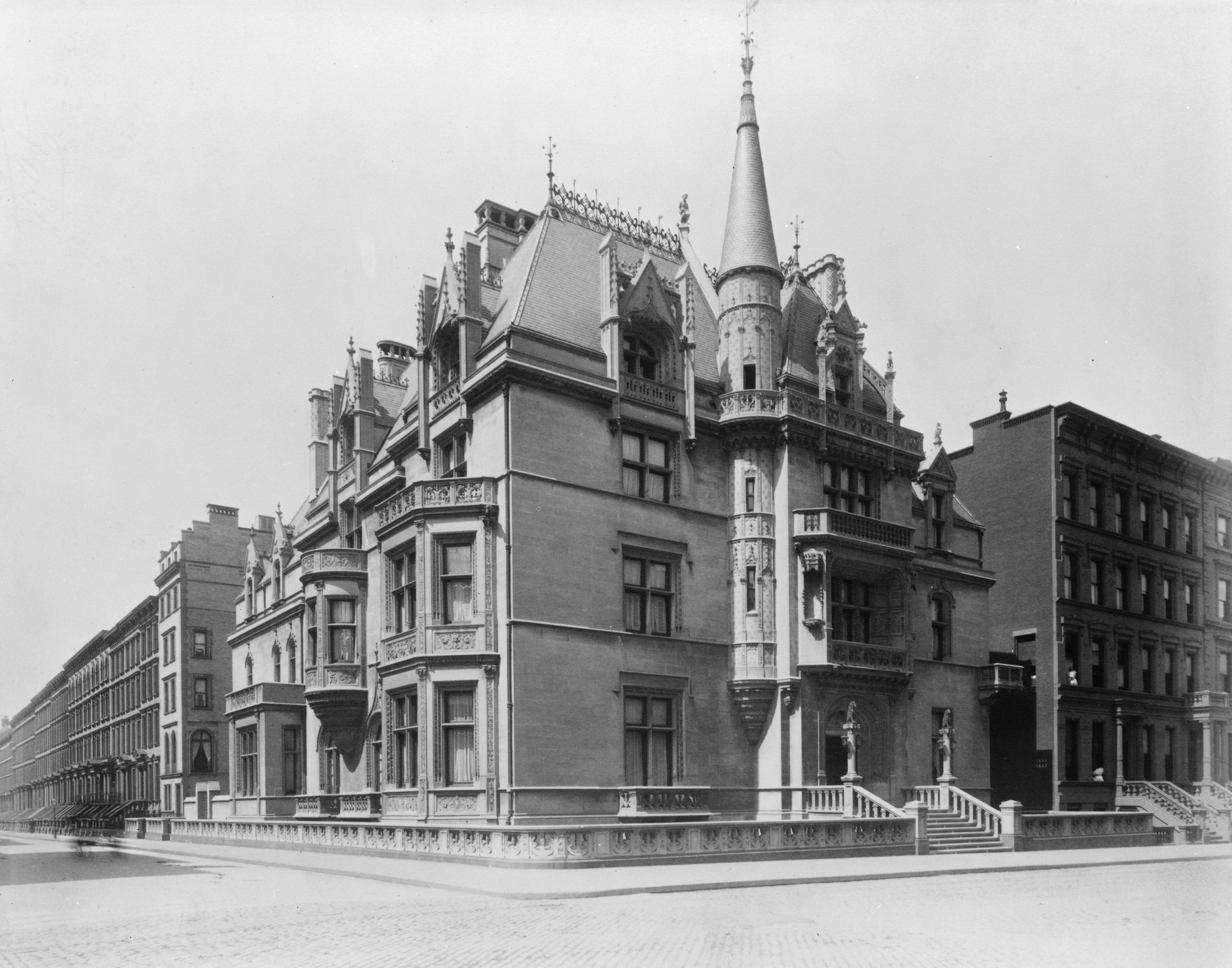
The William Kissam Vanderbilt mansion "Petit Chateau", designed by Richard Morris Hunt, stood on the corner of Fifth Avenue and 52nd Street until 1926

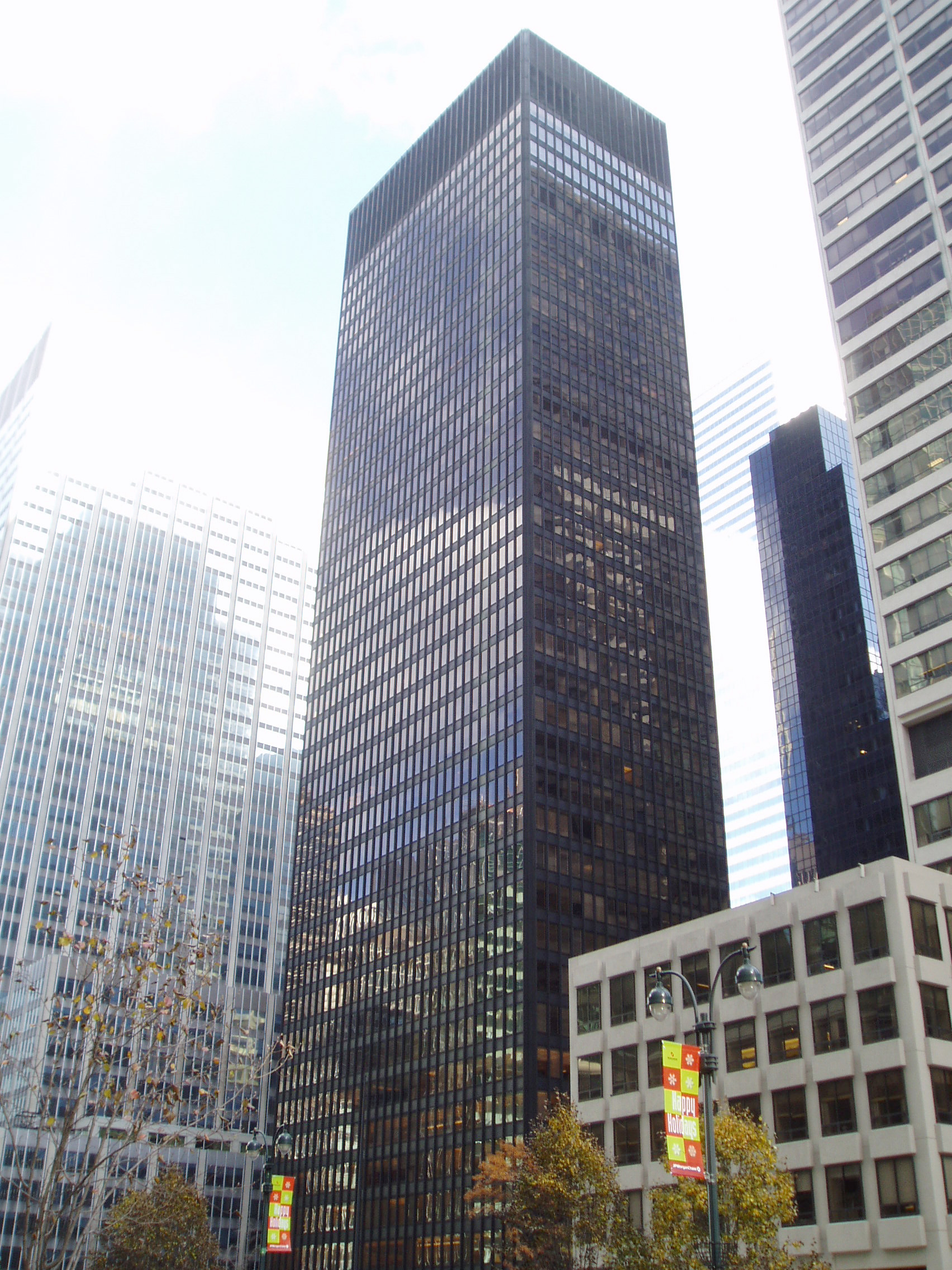
The Seagram Building was completed in 1957 and was designed by Ludwig Mies van der Rohe, in collaboration with Philip Johnson

=== Broadway ===
- Sheraton Manhattan Hotel at Times Square, 22-story, 225 ft (69 m) opened in 1962 (south)

=== Seventh Avenue ===
- Seventh Avenue to Sixth Avenue is signed W.C. Handy's Place
- AXA Center, 54-floor, 752 ft (229 m) office tower opened in 1986 (south)
- Sheraton New York Hotel & Towers, 51-story, 501 ft (153 m) opened in 1962 (north)
- Flatotel New York City, 46-floor, 475 ft (145 m) hotel that opened in 1992 and closed in 2013; now condominiums) (north)
- Credit Lyonnais Building, 45-floor, 609 ft (186 m) office building that opened in 1964 (north)
- 1285 Avenue of the Americas, 42-story, 545 ft (166 m) office building (south)

=== Sixth and a Half Avenue ===
- In the middle of the block between Sixth and Seventh Avenues is a pedestrian corridor named by the city "Sixth and a Half Avenue", which runs from 51st to 57th Streets.

=== Sixth Avenue ===
- Sixth Avenue to Fifth Avenue is signed "Swing Street".
- AXA Financial Center, 43-story, 571 ft (174 m) completed in 1963. It has a large Thomas Hart Benton mural in lobby. (south)
- CBS Building, headquarters of the network and popularly referred to as "Black Rock" (north)
- 31 West 52nd Street 30-floor, 411 ft (125 m) completed in 1986 originally for the E.F. Hutton headquarters. Currently the New York office of the international law firm, Clifford Chance (north) and the New York office of investment bank TD Securities, as well as the New York office for the international law firm Holland & Knight LLP.
- Paley Center for the Media (north)
- 75 Rockefeller Center, 33-story, 424 ft (129 m) building completed in 1947 the last of the original Rockefeller Center buildings that was originally used for the headquarters of the Rockefeller Esso Oil Company (north)
- 21 Club (north)
- 666 Fifth Avenue (north)
- 650 Fifth Avenue, 36-story, 492 ft (150 m) office tower completed in 1978 (south)

=== Fifth Avenue ===
- The Street between Fifth and Madison Avenues is signed "Place de Cartier" because of the Cartier store at 653 Fifth Avenue. (south)
- Olympic Tower (south)
- Austrian Cultural Forum Building for Austria
- House of Thurn, haute couture fashion label was located at 15 East 52nd Street, 1913-1934
- Hanover Bank Building, 30-story, 389 ft (119 m), completed in 1962
- Omni Berkshire Place (north)
- Look Building, 488 Madison Avenue (south)

=== Madison Avenue ===
- Park Avenue Plaza Building, 45-story, 574 ft (175 m) building completed in 1981 above the Racquet and Tennis Club (north)

=== Park Avenue ===
- Seagram Building, 38-floor, 515 ft (157 m) building completed in 1958, formerly home to the Four Seasons Restaurant (north)
- 345 Park Avenue, 44-story, 634 ft (193 m) building completed in 1969 (south)

=== Lexington Avenue ===
- 52nd between Lexington and Third Avenue is signed Israel Bonds Way (the Development Corporation for Israel which issues the bonds is headquartered at the intersection in the Grolier Building).
- Grolier Building, 33-story, 414 ft (126 m) building completed in 1958
- 599 Lexington Avenue, 50-story, 653 ft (199 m) building completed in 1986 (north)
- 150 East 52nd Street, 35-story, 390 ft (120 m) building completed in 1983

=== Third Avenue ===
- 875 3rd Avenue, 29-story, 399 ft (122 m) building completed in 1983 (north)
- MacMillan Building, 31-story, 364 ft (111 m) building completed in 1966
- Hungary Consulate
- Zambia Mission to the United Nations
- Rockefeller Guest House, 242 East 52nd Street (south)

=== Second Avenue ===
- Thailand Consulate and Mission to the United Nations

=== First Avenue ===
The block between First Avenue and FDR has been subject of an attempt to designate it as its own neighborhood.

- 52nd Street is two-way traffic east of First Avenue since it dead-ends on a bluff above the FDR Drive.
- Southgate Apartment
- Rivergate Apartment
- Sutton House
- 450 East 52nd - "The Campanile" is a 14-story brick cooperative apartment building overlooking the East River. It was home to celebrities such as Greta Garbo and John Lennon.
- River House

== In literature and popular culture ==
In W. H. Auden's poem "September 1, 1939", about the Second World War, Auden narrates himself as being on 52nd Street.

A 1948 amateur recording of Charlie Parker at the Onyx Club, Bird on 52nd St., was released by Jazz Workshop in 1957.

Billy Joel has a studio album titled 52nd Street. The songs, including the hit single "Honesty", have a jazz flavoring not found on his other albums.

Toshiki Kadomatsu wrote a song titled "52nd Street 'Akiko'", which is on his album Sea Is a Lady.

The Twilight Zone, episode 32, "A Passage for Trumpet", refers to the jazz clubs of 52nd Street.

Van Morrison's 1972 song "Saint Dominic's Preview" includes the lyrics "And meanwhile we're over on a 52nd Street apartment/Socializing with the wino few".

Daniel Okrent invented Rotisserie League Baseball, a form of fantasy baseball, in 1979. The name comes from the name of the restaurant, La Rôtisserie Française restaurant on New York City's East 52nd Street, where he first suggested the idea to his friends.
