= Etymology of hippie =

Etymology and theories on the origins of the word 'hippie'

According to lexicographer Jesse Sheidlower, the terms hipster and hippie derive from the word hip and the synonym hep, whose origins are disputed. The words hip and hep first surfaced in slang around the beginning of the 20th century and spread quickly, making their first appearance in the Oxford English Dictionary in 1904. At the time, the words were used to mean "aware" and "in the know". In the late 1960s, African language scholar David Dalby popularized the idea that words used in American slang could be traced back to West Africa. He claimed that hipi (a word in the Wolof language meaning "to open one's eyes") was the source for both hip and hep. Sheidlower, however, disputes Dalby's assertion that the term hip comes from Wolof origins.

== Early usages ==
During the jive era of the late 1930s and early 1940s, African-Americans began to use the term hip to mean "sophisticated, fashionable and fully up-to-date". Harry Gibson added the term "the Hipster" to his Harlem stage act in 1944, and in his later autobiography, says he coined it for that purpose. In the 1970s, Gibson remade his act to appeal to contemporary hippies, and is known as the 'original hippie'.

The form hippie is first attested in print, according to the OED as jazz slang in a 1948 issue of Billboard Magazine: "Drawing everything from Betty (Legs) Henderson to a group of assorted hippies, the Clique Club, the new Broadway jazz bistro, made its debut this week." (11 Dec. 1948)

The term is generally agreed in later sources to have been in use from the 1940s. Reminiscing about late 1940s Harlem in his 1964 autobiography, Malcolm X referred to the word hippy as a term that African Americans used to describe a specific type of white man who "acted more Negro than Negroes".

Another early attestation appeared in Flee the Angry Strangers, a 1952 novel by George Mandel about the drug world: “Every junkie and hippie came to sit around her table.” This was followed by the Aug. 18, 1957 New York Times Magazine: “Hippy—Generic for a character who is super-cool, over-blasé, so far out that he appears to be asleep when he’s digging something the most.” Then in February 1958, “Madison Avenue hippies... Upper Bohemia, tired of Van Gogh, Italian movies, charades, and sex, and so ready to try anti-art, anti-sex, anti-frantic non-movement.” (“The American as Hipster,” an essay by Herbert Gold, originally published in Playboy Magazine as “The Beat Mystique.”)

In Greenwich Village, New York City by the end of the 1950s, young counterculture advocates were widely called hips because they were considered "in the know" or "cool", as opposed to being square.

The earliest song to mention the word "Hippy" is the 1957 r-n-b (doo-wop) single "Hippy-Dippy-Daddy" by The Cookies, followed by the 1959 rock 'n roll single "Hippy Hippy Shake" by Chan Romero, which reached #3 in Australia, and was also covered by the Beatles in 1963. One of the earliest print attestations of the term hippy is found in the "Dictionary of Hip Words and Phrases" included in the liner notes for the 1959 comedy album How to Speak Hip, a parody based on the burgeoning Greenwich Village scene. As opposed to the hipster, defined as "A fully paid-up member of Hip society", a hippy is "A junior member of Hip society, who may know the words, but hasn't fully assimilated the proper attitude." It also defines hippie-dip as "Derogatory word for hippy."

A syndicated newspaper column from 1960 said "Bobby Darin, a hippie from New York City, Tonsil No. 1, in the 'New Noise' sweeping America, completely conquered all the New York hippies."

Ground-breaking comic host Steve Allen thought that he was "the first to turn the adjective 'hip' into the noun 'hippie' ... about 1960".

In a 1961 essay, Kenneth Rexroth of San Francisco used both the terms hipster and hippies to refer to young people participating in African American or Beatnik nightlife.

In 1963, the Orlons, an African-American singing group from Philadelphia, Pennsylvania released the soul dance song "South Street", which included the lyrics "Where do all the hippies meet? South Street, South Street ... The hippest street in town". Some transcriptions read "Where do all the hippist (sic) meet?" Nevertheless, since many heard it as "hippies", that use was promoted. Another 1963 song by the Dovells, "You Can't Sit Down" also referenced South Street Philadelphia and hippies: "When you're on South Street and the band is really bootin'. You hear the hippie with the back beat ...". Another use around the same time was on the 1963 Freddy Cannon single on Swan Records, "Do What the Hippies Do". In addition, the Stereos, a doo-wop group who had already released their 1959 single "Memory Lane" under the alias "the Tams" (not the more famous group the Tams), re-released the recording yet again in 1963 under the name of "the Hippies".

== Later use ==
Numerous theories abound as to the origin of this word. One of the most credible involves the beatniks, who abandoned North Beach, San Francisco, to flee commercialism in the early 1960s. Many of them moved to the Haight-Ashbury area of San Francisco, where they were idolized and emulated by the young university students who lived in the neighborhood. The beats (the hip people) started calling these students "hippies", or younger versions of themselves. Actually, the counterculture seldom called itself hippies; it was the media and straight society who popularized the term. More often, we called ourselves freaks or heads. Not until later did we begin calling ourselves hippies, and by then we were "aging hippies". An alternate spelling seldom used in the United States by people in the know was hippy, but it was spelled that way in England.

— John Bassett McCleary,

In a June 11, 1963 syndicated column by Dorothy Killgallen, she wrote "New York hippies have a new kick – baking marijuana in cookies". The term "hippie" appears in a book review in The New York Times of April 21, 1964, entitled "Is The Pentagon Threatened by Civilians on Horseback?" where it said "Mr. Raymond felicitously gives us a hippie link between the present and the past." The term appeared numerous times in the Village Voice on September 10, 1964, in an article entitled "Baby Beatniks Spark Bar Boom on East Side". Another early appearance of the term hippies was on November 27, 1964, in a Time magazine article about a 20-year-old's drug use scandalizing the town of Darien, Connecticut: "The trouble is that in a school of 1,018 pupils so near New York there is bound to be a fast set of hard-shell hippies like Alpert [the 20-year-old] who seem utterly glamorous to more sheltered types." Shortly afterwards, on December 6, 1964, in an article entitled "Jean Shepherd Leads His Flock On A Search For Truth", journalist Bernard Weinraub of The New York Times wrote about the Limelight coffeehouse, quoting Shepherd as using the term hippie while describing the beatnik fashions that had newly arrived in Greenwich Village from Queens, Staten Island, Newark, Jersey City, and Brooklyn. And the Zanesville Times Recorder, on January 1, 1965, ran a story questioning how society could tolerate a new underground New York newspaper started by Ed Sanders called The Marijuana Times — whose first issue (of only two, dated January 30) it directly quoted as saying: "The latest Pot statistics compiled through the services of the Hippie Dope Exchange, will be printed in each issue of the Marijuana Newsletter."

Another early appearance was in the liner notes to the Rolling Stones album, The Rolling Stones, Now!, released in February 1965 and written by the band's then-manager, Andrew Loog Oldham. One sentence of the notes reads, "Their music is Berry-chuck and all the Chicago hippies". and another sentence from the same source reads, "Well, my groobies, what about Richmond, with its grass green and hippy scene from which the Stones untaned."

Rev. Howard R. Moody, of the Judson Memorial Church in Greenwich Village, was quoted in the June 6, 1965, New York Times as saying "Every hippy is somebody's square. And don't you ever forget it."

By around this time, "hippies" were being noted on the U.S. West Coast as well. The first clearly contemporary use of the word "hippie" appeared in print on September 5, 1965. In an article entitled "A New Haven for Beatniks", San Francisco journalist Michael Fallon wrote about the Blue Unicorn coffeehouse, using the term hippie to refer to the new generation of beatniks who had moved from North Beach into the Haight-Ashbury district of San Francisco. (In a 1969 interview, San Francisco writer Ralph Gleason attributed this move to tourism.) Fallon reportedly came up with the name by condensing Norman Mailer's use of the word hipster into hippie.

Use of the term hippie did not become widespread in the mass media until early 1967, after San Francisco Chronicle columnist Herb Caen (the same columnist who had coined the term beatnik in 1958) began referring to hippies in his daily columns.

The New York Times editor and usage writer Theodore M. Bernstein said the paper changed the spelling from hippy to hippie to avoid the ambiguous description of clothing as hippy fashions.

== Pejorative use ==
To the Beat Generation that had been active since the 1940s, the flood of youths in the 1960s adopting beatnik sensibilities appeared as a cheap, mass-produced imitation. By Beat Generation standards, these newcomers were not cool enough to be considered hip, so they used the term hippie with disdain. Ronald Reagan, who was governor of California during the height of the hippie movement, described a hippie as a person who "dresses like Tarzan, has hair like Jane, and smells like Cheeta." Others used the term hippie in a more personal way to disparage long-haired, unwashed, unkempt drug users. In contemporary conservative settings, the term hippie is often used to allude to slacker attitudes, irresponsibility, participation in recreational drug use, activism in causes considered relatively trivial, and leftist political leanings (regardless of whether the individual was actually connected to the hippie subculture). An example is its use by the South Park cartoon character, Eric Cartman.
