= Swedish Schnapps =

Studio album by Charlie Parker
- Released: 1958; 1991 (CD)
- Recorded: January 17 & August 8, 1951
- Genre: Jazz
- Length: 39:11
- Label: Verve Records; MG V-8010

Charlie Parker chronology
Bird at St. Nick's (1958)	Swedish Schnapps (1958)	Bird Is Free (1961)

Professional ratings
Review scores
Source	Rating
Allmusic	3/5 stars
The Rolling Stone Jazz Record Guide	5/5 stars
The Penguin Guide to Jazz Recordings	4/4 stars

Swedish Schnapps (The Genius of Charlie Parker, volume 8) (MG V-8010) is a Charlie Parker studio album, released by Verve Records, compiling recordings made by two different groups, on two different dates in 1951. The tracks had previously been released as 78 rpm singles, and the master takes had previously appeared on the 1955 Clef Records LP The Magnificent Charlie Parker (MG C-646).

== History ==
The two sessions feature either Max Roach or Kenny Clarke on drums. The January 17, 1951, session features Miles Davis on trumpet, who had made many recordings as part of Parker's band in 1946 and 1947. This recording session was the same day as Davis' own first recording session for his new label, Prestige Records, which he would complete later the same day.

== Track listing ==
Side one
No.	Title	Writer(s)	Length
1.	"Si Si"	Charlie Parker	2:38
2.	"Swedish Schnapps"	Charlie Shavers	3:14
3.	"Swedish Schnapps (Alternate Take)"	Charlie Shavers	3:11
4.	"Back Home Blues"	Charlie Parker	2:36
5.	"Back Home Blues (Alternate Take)"	Charlie Parker	2:47
6.	"Lover Man"	Jimmy Davis, Roger "Ram" Ramirez, James Sherman	3:22

Side two
No.	Title	Writer(s)	Length
7.	"Au Privave"	Charlie Parker	2:39
8.	"Au Privave (Alternate Take)"	Charlie Parker	2:43
9.	"She Rote"	Charlie Parker	3:09
10.	"She Rote (Alternate Take)"	Charlie Parker	3:06
11.	"K.C. Blues"	Charlie Parker	3:24
12.	"Star Eyes"	Gene de Paul, Don Raye	3:35
13.	"Blues for Alice"	Charlie Parker	2:47

== Personnel ==
tracks 1–6, 13 August 8, 1951

- Charlie Parker - alto saxophone
- Red Rodney - trumpet
- John Lewis - piano
- Ray Brown - acoustic bass
- Kenny Clarke - drums

tracks 7–12 January 17, 1951

- Charlie Parker - alto saxophone
- Miles Davis - trumpet
- Walter Bishop Jr. - piano
- Teddy Kotick - acoustic bass
- Max Roach - drums & percussion
