= This Time the Dream's on Me =

Single by Glenn Miller and His Orchestra
- B-side: "Says Who? Says You, Says I!"
- Released: October 1941
- Label: Bluebird Records
- Songwriters: Harold Arlen and Johnny Mercer

"This Time the Dream's on Me"

Single by Woody Herman and His Orchestra
- B-side: "Blues in the Night"
- Released: October 1941
- Label: Decca Records
- Songwriters: Harold Arlen and Johnny Mercer

"This Time the Dream's on Me" is a song composed by Harold Arlen, with lyrics by Johnny Mercer. It was written for the 1941 film Blues in the Night when it was sung by Priscilla Lane.

== 1941 recordings ==
Hit versions in 1941 were by Glenn Miller (vocal by Ray Eberle) (reached No. 11 in the charts) and by Woody Herman (No. 8).

== Selected notable recordings ==
- Kenny Burrell – Introducing Kenny Burrell (1956)
- June Christy – Something Cool (1954)
- Ella Fitzgerald – Ella Fitzgerald Sings the Harold Arlen Songbook (1961), Ella Fitzgerald Sings the Johnny Mercer Songbook (1964) Ella Fitzgerald: Best of the Song Books – the Ballads (Verve 1994 release)
- Harry James – Harry James and His New Jazz Band, Vol. 2 (Mr. Music MMCD 7012, 1956 [2002])
- Steve March-Tormé – The Essence of Love (2003).
- Anthony Newley – Love Is a Now and Then Thing (1960).
- Nancy Wilson – Something Wonderful (1960)
- Tony Bennett – Sings a String of Harold Arlen (1961)
- Charlie Parker – Bird on 52nd St. (1948), One Night In Birdland (1950), Live Boston, Philadelphia, Brooklyn 1951 (1951), Bird Is Free (1952)
- Alison Krauss – Midnight in the Garden of Good and Evil (1997) Soundtrack
