= Bird on 52nd St. =

Live album by Charlie Parker
- Released: December 1957 (LP); October 21, 1994 (CD)
- Recorded: July 6, 1948
- Venue: Onyx Club, NYC
- Genre: Jazz
- Length: 40:01
- Label: Jazz Workshop; JWS 501

Charlie Parker chronology
The Cole Porter Songbook (1956)	Bird on 52nd St. (1957)	Bird at St. Nick's (1958)

Bird on 52nd St. is a live album by the saxophonist Charlie Parker. It was recorded in July 1948 at the Onyx Club (though the album's liner notes suggest it might have been recorded at the nearby Three Deuces club) on a non-professional tape recorder by trombonist Jimmy Knepper, a fan of Parker who also made the recording released as Bird at St. Nick's. It was first released in 1957 on Charles Mingus' Jazz Workshop label as JWS 501. Several tracks are incomplete; Knepper was focused on capturing Parker's solos to conserve audiotape.

== Critical reception ==
Professional ratings
Review scores
Source	Rating
AllMusic	1.5/5 stars
The Rolling Stone Album Guide	3.5/5 stars

AllMusic reviewer Scott Yanow wrote that Parker "plays quite brilliantly on this live set", but because of seriously deficient sound quality which "sometimes borders on the unlistenable" the album can be considered as being "for true Charlie Parker completists only."

== Track listing ==
=== Side A ===
1. "52nd Street Theme" (Thelonious Monk) – 2:19
2. "Shaw 'Nuff" (Ray Brown, Gil Fuller, Dizzy Gillespie) – 1:33
3. "Out of Nowhere" (Johnny Green, Edward Heyman) – 3:05
4. "Hot House" (Tadd Dameron) – 2:15
5. "This Time the Dream's on Me" (Harold Arlen, Johnny Mercer) – 2:21
6. "A Night in Tunisia" (Dizzy Gillespie) – 3:29
7. "My Old Flame" (Sam Coslow, Arthur Johnston) – 3:24
8. "52nd Street Theme" – 1:05

=== Side B ===
1. "The Way You Look Tonight" (Jerome Kern, Dorothy Fields) – 4:42
2. "Out of Nowhere" – 2:35
3. "Chasin' the Bird" (Parker) – 1:47
4. "This Time the Dreams's on Me" – 3:29
5. "Dizzy at Atmosphere" (Gillespie) – 2:59
6. "How High the Moon" (Nancy Hamilton, Morgan Lewis) – 3:38
7. "52nd Street Theme" – 1:14

== Personnel ==
- Charlie Parker – alto saxophone
- Miles Davis – trumpet
- Duke Jordan – piano
- Tommy Potter – bass
- Max Roach – drums
