= Bird at St. Nick's =

Live album by Charlie Parker
- Released: 1957
- Recorded: 1950
- Venue: St. Nicholas Arena
- Genre: Jazz
- Length: 41:40
- Label: Jazz Workshop; JWS–500

Charlie Parker chronology
Bird on 52nd St. (1957)	Bird at St. Nick's (1957)	Swedish Schnapps (1958)

Professional ratings
Review scores
Source	Rating
Allmusic	1.5/5 stars
Disc	5/5 stars
The Penguin Guide to Jazz Recordings	3.5/4 stars

Bird at St. Nick's was a live tape recording by Charlie Parker taken from a February 1950 performance at St. Nicholas Arena. The recording was made on non-professional equipment by Jimmy Knepper, a young trombonist who became an integral member of Charles Mingus’ ensemble. As with his recording released as Bird on 52nd St., Knepper focused mainly on recording Parker's solos to conserve audiotape. The album was the first release on Charles Mingus' Jazz Workshop label.

== Track listing ==
1. I Didn't Know What Time It Was 2:35
2. Ornithology 3:27
3. Embraceable You 2:18
4. Visa 2:57
5. I Cover the Waterfront 1:44
6. Scrapple from the Apple 4:34
7. Star Eyes/52nd Street Theme 3:02
8. Confirmation 3:18
9. Out of Nowhere 2:17
10. Hot House 3:45
11. What's New 2:43
12. Now's The Time 4:14
13. Smoke Gets In Your Eyes/52nd Street Theme 4:46

== Personnel ==
- Charlie Parker—alto saxophone
- Red Rodney—trumpet
- Al Haig—piano
- Tommy Potter—bass
- Roy Haynes—drums
