= Bird Is Free =

Live album by Charlie Parker
- Released: 1961
- Recorded: 26 September 1952
- Venue: Rockland Palace, New York City
- Genre: Jazz
- Length: 36:39

Charlie Parker chronology
Swedish Schnapps (1958)	Bird Is Free (1961)	One Night in Birdland (1977)

Bird Is Free is an album by Charlie Parker that documents a concert given at Rockland Palace, New York City, on 26 September 1952. In 1997, Jazz Classics released a more complete documentation of the concert with improved recording quality, Live at Rockland Palace.

== Reception ==
Professional ratings
Review scores
Source	Rating
AllMusic	2/5 stars
DownBeat	4.5/5 stars

The DownBeat reviewer, Leonard Feather, identified limitations of the audio quality, and added: "When Parker begins to play, however, you will forget all about distractions. ... There is brilliant, boiling, poetic Bird in a variety of attitudes here." The AllMusic review concluded: "Throughout, Parker plays with inimitable style and good humor and his quartet, featuring the great drummer Max Roach, swings effortlessly".

== Track listing ==
Side 1

1. Rocker (Gerry Mulligan)
2. Sly Mongoose (Jamaican trad.)
3. Moose the Mooche (Parker)
4. Star Eyes (Gene de Paul, Don Raye)

Side 2

1. This Time the Dream's on Me (Harold Arlen, Johnny Mercer)
2. Cool Blues (Parker)
3. My Little Suede Shoes (Parker)
4. Lester Leaps In (Lester Young)
5. Laura (Raksin, Mercer)

== Personnel ==
- Charlie Parker – alto sax
- Mundell Lowe – guitar
- Walter Bishop, Jr. – piano
- Teddy Kotick – bass
- Max Roach – drums
- unidentified strings on "Rocker" and "Laura"

== See also ==
- English translation of German Wikipedia Bird Is Free article with many details
