= Famous Door =

Jazz club in New York City (1935–1960s)

- Interactive map of Famous Door
- Address: 52nd Street
- Location: New York City
- Coordinates: 40.757076°N 73.969857°W
- Type: Nightclub
- Event: Jazz

Construction
- Opened: March 1, 1935
- Closed: 1960s

The Famous Door was a jazz club on New York's 52nd Street. It opened in 1935 and was one of the major clubs on the street, hosting leading jazz musicians until 1950, through changes of location and periods of closure.

== History ==
The Famous Door opened at 35 West 52nd Street on March 1, 1935. Among its initial backers were the radio bandleader Lennie Hayton, who helped promote it, and musicians Jimmy Dorsey and Glenn Miller. Louis Prima performed on the club's opening night. "The club was intended to provide a reliable venue for swing musicians and a place where they could gather, but other customers were attracted by the door inside (autographed by visiting celebrities) which gave the club its name, the fine music, and drinks that started at fifty cents." An upstairs room was used for informal jazz sessions. In its first year, musicians such as Bunny Berigan, Georg Brunis, Bobby Hackett, Billie Holiday, Max Kaminsky, Wingy Manone, and Red Norvo helped establish its reputation. Vocalist Bessie Smith's only 52nd Street appearance was at the Famous Door – for a single date in February 1936. The club was predominantly for white musicians; black musicians Holiday and pianist Teddy Wilson were fired for mingling with Charlie Barnet, a white bandleader who was in the audience. Financial problems led to the club closing on May 10, 1936.

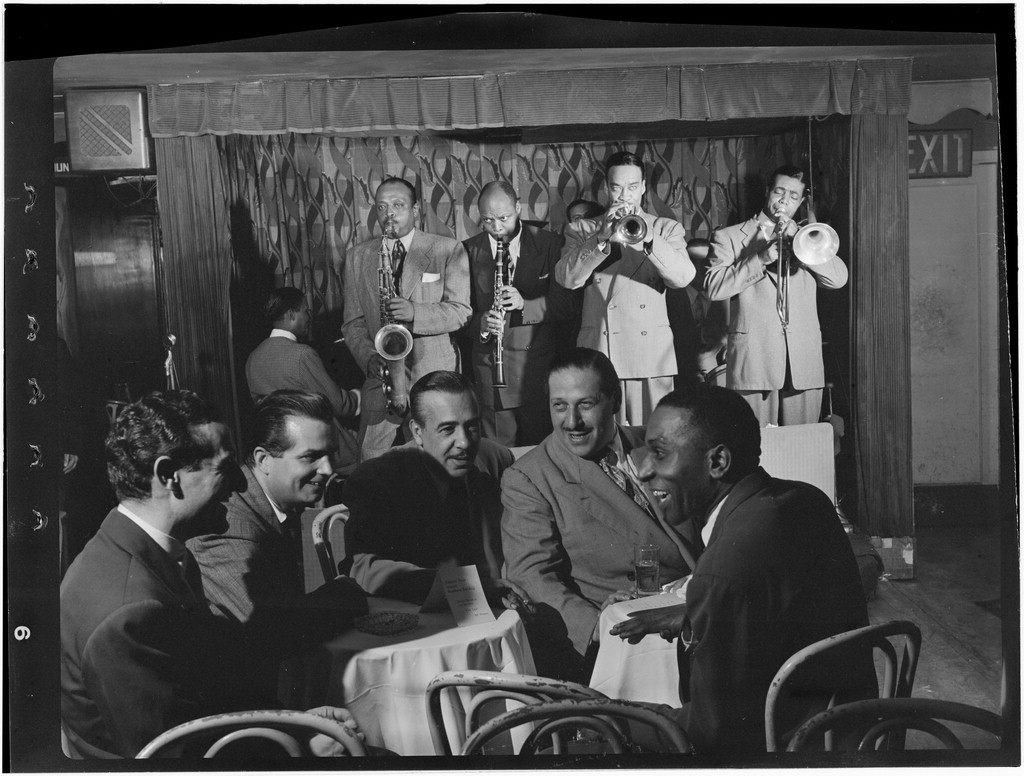
Ben Webster, Eddie Barefield, Buck Clayton, and Benny Morton on stage at the Famous Door, c. October 1947

A new version of the club opened at 66 West 52nd Street in December 1937. Its capacity was no more than sixty. Prima was again the first to be given a residency, with pianist Art Tatum playing between sets. Big bands also played there in the 1930s and 1940s, even though the bandstand was small. There were also frequent radio broadcasts from the venue by CBS in the late 1930s. Broadcasts by Count Basie's big band from the club several nights a week in part of 1938 helped develop his career. This was facilitated by a representative of the MCA booking agency, which paid for the club to make alterations, including the installation of air conditioning. A failure to pay wages to the musicians meant that the club was closed from June to September 1940. The club was part of the scene in which bebop developed: Benny Carter reported that he was asked to dismiss the experimenting trumpeter Dizzy Gillespie from his band when playing there around 1942: "I was asked to get rid of him because he was playing augmented ninths, etc. They thought he was hitting bad notes." In November 1943, the Famous Door moved to 201 West 52nd Street, but this survived for only a short time into 1944.

The club was revived in 1947, this time at 56 West 52nd Street. This again featured leading jazz figures of the time, this time in the swing and bebop styles. It closed in 1950. The final location for a New York club named Famous Door was on 52nd Street during the 1960s. Other United States cities have been the base for clubs using the name, including a venue in New Orleans.
