= Harry Gibson =

American jazz pianist (1915–1991)

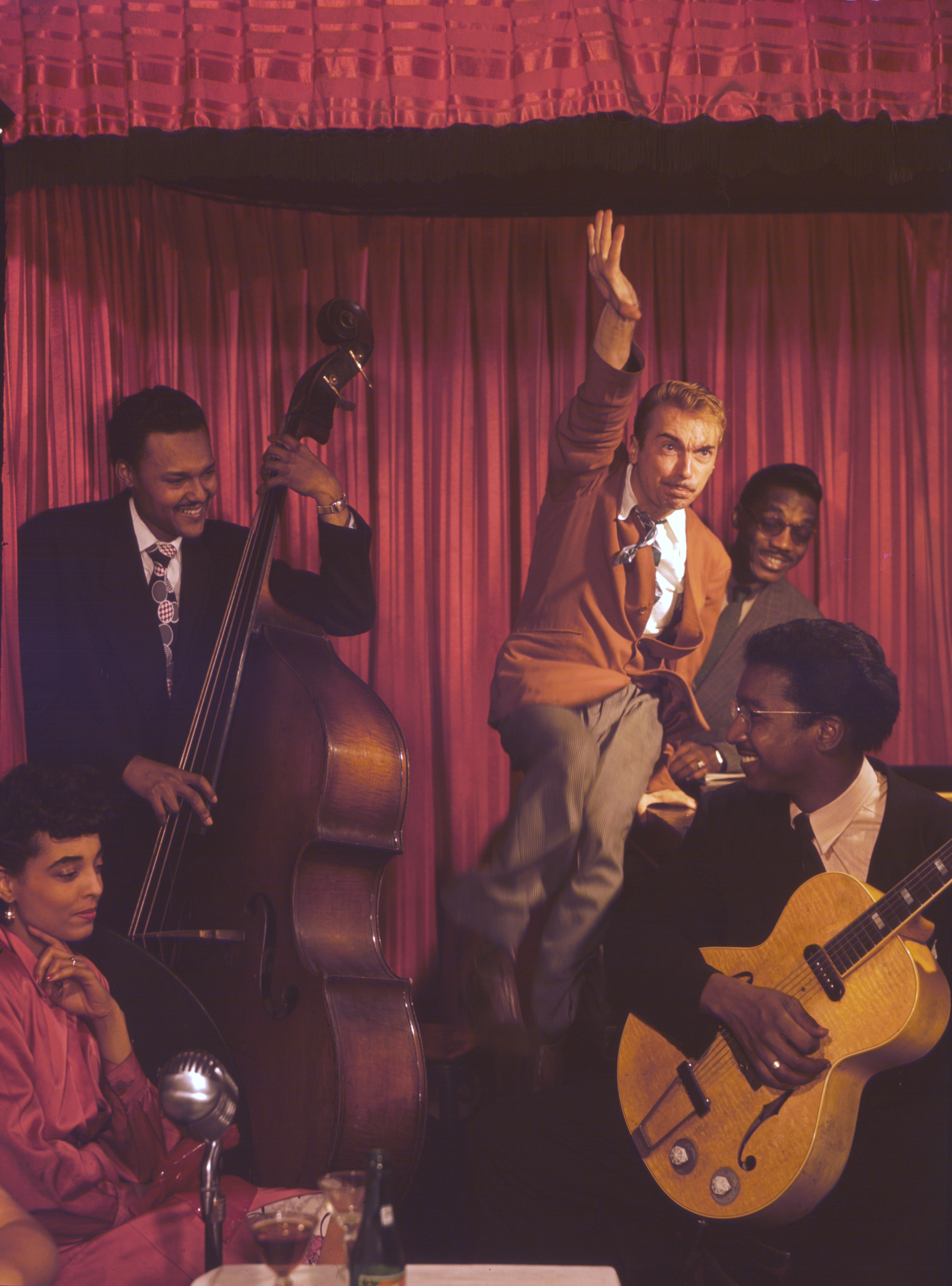
- Gibson (middle) in New York, c. 1948

Background information
- Born: Harry Raab; June 27, 1915; New York City, U.S.
- Died: May 3, 1991 (aged 75) Brawley, California, U.S.
- Genre: Jazz
- Occupations: Musician, singer, songwriter
- Instruments: Piano, vocals
- Years active: 1928–1980s
- Labels: Musicraft, V-Disc

Harry "the Hipster" Gibson (June 27, 1915 – May 3, 1991), born Harry Raab, was an American jazz pianist, singer, and songwriter. He played New York style stride piano and boogie woogie while singing in a wild, unrestrained style. His music career began in the late 1920s, when, under his real name, he played stride piano in Dixieland jazz bands in Harlem. He continued to perform there throughout the 1930s, adding the barrelhouse boogie of the time to his repertoire.

== Early life ==
Gibson was Jewish. He came from a musical family that operated a player piano repair shop. He began playing piano in the 1920s as a child, in the Bronx and Harlem. His first professional piano gig was at age 13 with his uncle's orchestra. He began playing boogie woogie and talking in a jive style. He was invited into black speakeasies in Harlem to play piano while still a teenager.

== Career ==
In the 1930s, after Prohibition ended, Gibson played regularly in Harlem nightclubs. He punctuated his piano stylings with a running line of jive patter, which can be traced directly to recordings of Fats Waller".

Gibson was fond of playing Fats Waller tunes, and when Waller heard Gibson in a club in Harlem in 1939 he hired Gibson to be his relief pianist at club dates. Between 1939 and 1945, Gibson played at Manhattan jazz clubs on 52nd Street ("Swing Street"), most notably the Three Deuces, run by Irving Alexander, and Leon and Eddie's run by Leon Enkin and Eddie Davis. During one audition for a nightclub engagement, where he played piano for a girl singer, he gave his true name of Harry Raab. The club owner insisted on a "showbiz" name, shouting, "I'm calling you two The Gibsons!" Harry adopted Gibson as his professional name.

In the 1940s, Gibson was known for writing unusual songs considered ahead of their time. He was also known for his unique, wild singing style, his energetic and unorthodox piano styles, and his intricate mixture of hardcore, gutbucket boogie rhythms with ragtime, stride and jazz piano styles. He took the boogie woogie beat of his predecessors, but he made it frantic, similar to the rock and roll music of the 1950s. Examples of his wild style are found in "Riot in Boogie" and "Barrelhouse Boogie". Other songs that he recorded were "Handsome Harry, the Hipster", "I Stay Brown All Year 'Round", 4-F Ferdinand the Frantic Freak", "Get Your Juices at the Deuces" and "Stop That Dancin' Up There".

Gibson recorded often, but there are very few visual examples of his work. In 1944, he filmed three songs in New York for the Soundies film jukeboxes, and he went to Hollywood in 1946 to appear as himself in the feature-length film musical Junior Prom. He preceded white rock-and-rollers by a decade: the Soundies he recorded are similar to Jerry Lee Lewis's raucous piano numbers of the 1950s.

Like Mezz Mezzrow, Gibson consciously abandoned his ethnicity to adopt black music and culture. He grew up near Harlem in New York City, and his constant use of black jive talk was not an affectation; it was something he picked up from his fellow musicians. His song "I Stay Brown All Year Round" is based on this. In his autobiography, he claimed he coined the term hipster between 1939 and 1945 when he was performing on Swing Street, and he started using "Harry the Hipster" as his stage name.

== Classical music work ==
Gibson's wild-man theatrics belied the fact that he was also a highly trained classical musician. While working on "Swing Street" at night, he was a fellow at the Juilliard Graduate School during the day.

Gibson was invited to perform at Carnegie Hall, for a jazz concert held on December 2, 1944. Hosted by Eddie Condon, the program featured many celebrities from the jazz world. Gibson performed a serious rendition of Bix Beiderbecke's piano piece "In a Mist". "The acoustics are so big in Carnegie Hall that when I hit that piano, I thought I was playing 40 pianos," said Gibson. "After I did the Carnegie Hall concert, I got a write-up in Downbeat and he said the best thing in the whole program was Harry Gibson, the guy that went up and played Bix Beiderbecke solos. Musicraft [Records] saw the writeup, came down to the Deuces to listen to me. Billie Holiday was late for her show, and Irving Alexander always stuck me on when she was late for her show to keep the people there... And I'm doing my Harry the Hipster act... and I go out with 'Barrelhouse Boogie.'" Musicraft signed Gibson on the spot, and he recruited drummer Big Sid Catlett and bassist John Simmons for a recording session the next morning, resulting in the hit album Boogie Woogie in Blue. "Eight songs, and not a clinker in 'em," said Gibson proudly. "Right straight out, eight takes, eight songs. Perfect."

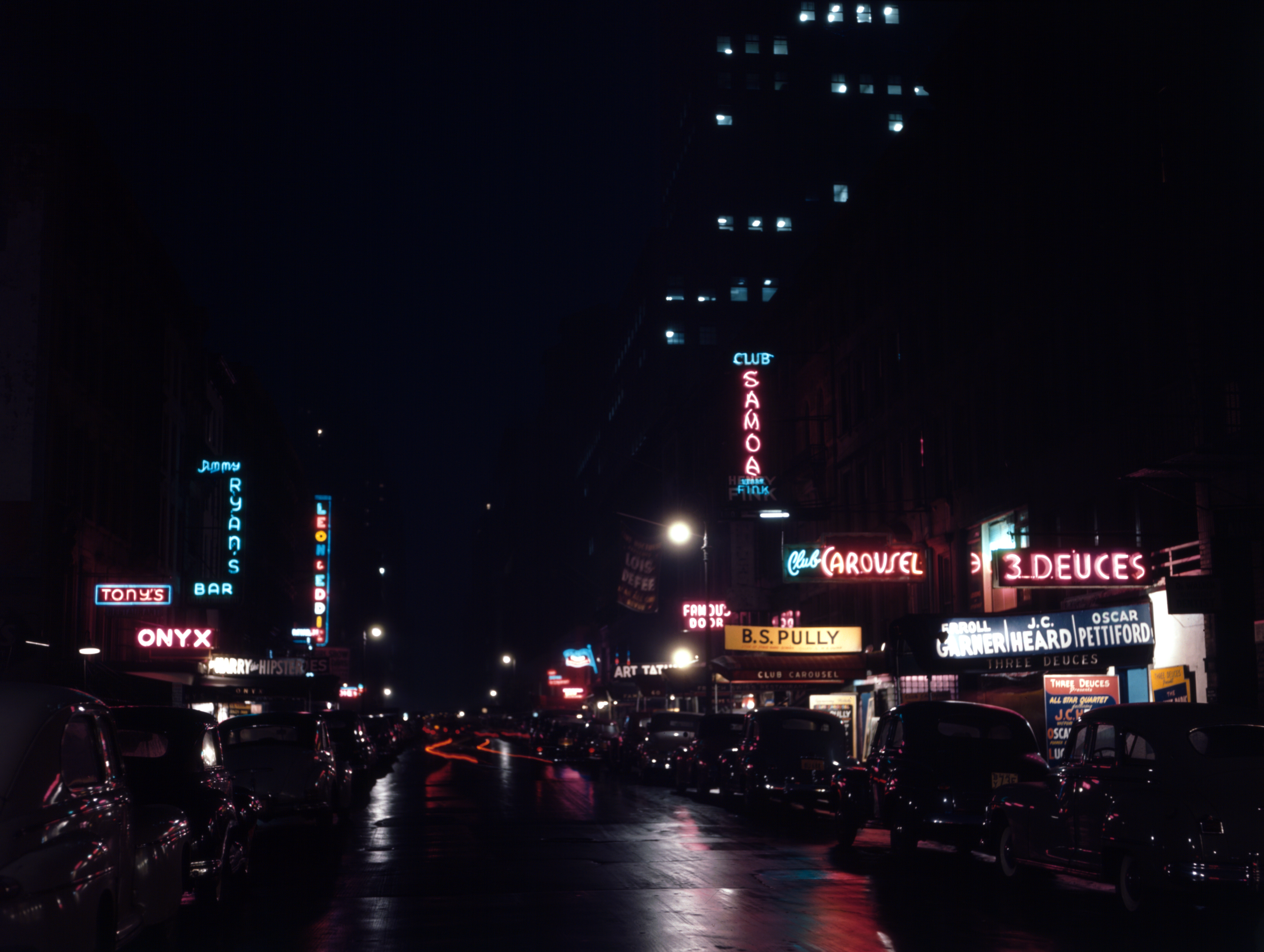
"Harry the Hipster" headlining at the Onyx on 52nd Street, May 1948. The photo also shows two of Gibson's other haunts, The Three Deuces and Leon and Eddie's.

== Notoriety ==
He recorded "Who Put the Benzedrine in Mrs. Murphy's Ovaltine?", released in January 1946. "I was with Musicraft at the time," recalled Gibson in a radio interview with Dr. Demento. "We got in there, man, we knocked the tune off and bam! I get splashes [press coverage] for a month. One month later, benzedrine becomes illegal. You dig, it was legal when I made it. They put the kibosh on the record and they stamped it subversive." Radio stations across America refused to play it, and Gibson was blacklisted in the music industry. Although his mainstream movie appearance in Junior Prom was released that year, it could not overcome the notoriety of the "Benzedrine" record.

Sidelined from a recording career, Gibson pursued live appearances. In 1946 he was hired by impresario J. J. Shubert for Mae West's touring stage show. He spent time in Miami during the 1950s, and appeared at the Ball & Chain nightclub in Miami on the same bill with Billie Holiday during the Christmas season of 1956. With the rising popularity of young rock-and-roll musicians among teenagers in the 1950s, older musicians were not in demand, and Gibson's own drug use led to his decline.

== Career change and comeback ==
In the 1960s, when Gibson saw the success of the Beatles, he switched to rock and roll. By the 1970s, he was playing hard rock, blues, bop, novelty songs, and a few songs that mixed ragtime with rock and roll. His hipster act became a hippie act. His old records were revived on Dr. Demento's national radio show, particularly "Benzedrine", which was included on the 1975 compilation album Dr. Demento's Delights.

His comeback resulted in three new albums: Harry the Hipster Digs Christmas, Everybody's Crazy but Me, (its title taken from the lyrics of "Stop That Dancin' Up There") (Progressive, 1986), and Who Put the Benzedrine in Mrs. Murphy's Ovaltine (Delmark, 1989). The latter two feature jazz, blues, ragtime, and rock and roll songs about reefer, nude bathing, hippie communes, strip clubs, male chauvinists, "rocking the 88s", and Shirley MacLaine.

Gibson may have been the only jazz pianist of the 1930s and 1940s to go on to play in rock bands in the 1970s and 1980s. The only constants were his tendency to play hard-rocking boogie woogie and his tongue-in-cheek references to drug use. In 1991, shortly before his death, his family filmed a biographical featurette on his life and music, Boogie in Blue, published as a VHS video that year.

Gibson died from a self-inflicted gunshot on May 3, 1991, after suffering from congestive heart failure. He was 75.

== Discography ==
- Boogie Woogie in Blue (Musicraft, 1984; reissue of 1944 album)
- Harry the Hipster Digs Christmas (Totem, 1976; amateur recordings)
- Everybody's Crazy but Me (Progressive, 1986; new recordings)
- Who Put the Benzedrine in Mrs. Murphy's Ovaltine? (Delmark, 1996; recorded in 1989)
- Rockin' Rhythm (Sutton; piano album includes three Harry Gibson 78s from the 1940s)

== Audio samples ==
- (1 minute of) "Barrelhouse Boogie"
- (1 minute of) "Hipster's Boogie"
