= Square (slang) =

Slang term

Square is slang for a person who is conventional and old-fashioned, similar to a fuddy-duddy. This sense of the word "square" originated with the American jazz community in the 1940s in reference to people "out of touch" with musical trends. Older senses of the term square, referring positively to someone or something honest and upstanding, date back to the 16th century.

== History ==
The English word square dates to the 13th century and derives from the Old French esquarre.By the 1570s, it was in use in reference to someone or something honest or fair. This positive sense is preserved in phrases such as "fair and square", meaning something done in an honest and straightforward manner, and "square deal", meaning an outcome equitable to all sides. A West Country variant on the phrase, "fairs pears", bears the same meaning and was first traced by Cecil Sharp in 1903 when visiting his friend (and lyrics editor) Charles Marson in Hambridge, South Somerset.

The sense of square as a derogatory reference to someone conventional or old-fashioned dates to the jazz scene of the 1940s; the first known reference is from 1944. There it applied to someone who failed to appreciate the medium of jazz, or more broadly, someone whose tastes were out of date and out of touch. It may derive from the rigid motion of a conductor's hands in a conventional, four-beat rhythm. It is used as both an adjective and a noun. A square contrasted with someone who was hip, or in the know. The cub scout promise included the pledge "to be square" from the 1950s to the 1970s. In contemporary language, U.S. branches of the military refer to "squared away" to describe things that are ordered.

== In popular culture ==
According to American singer Huey Lewis, his 1986 single "Hip to Be Square" unintentionally became an "anthem for square people".

== See also ==
- The Man
- The Establishment
