= Onyx Club =

New York City jazz club (1927–1939; 1942–1949)

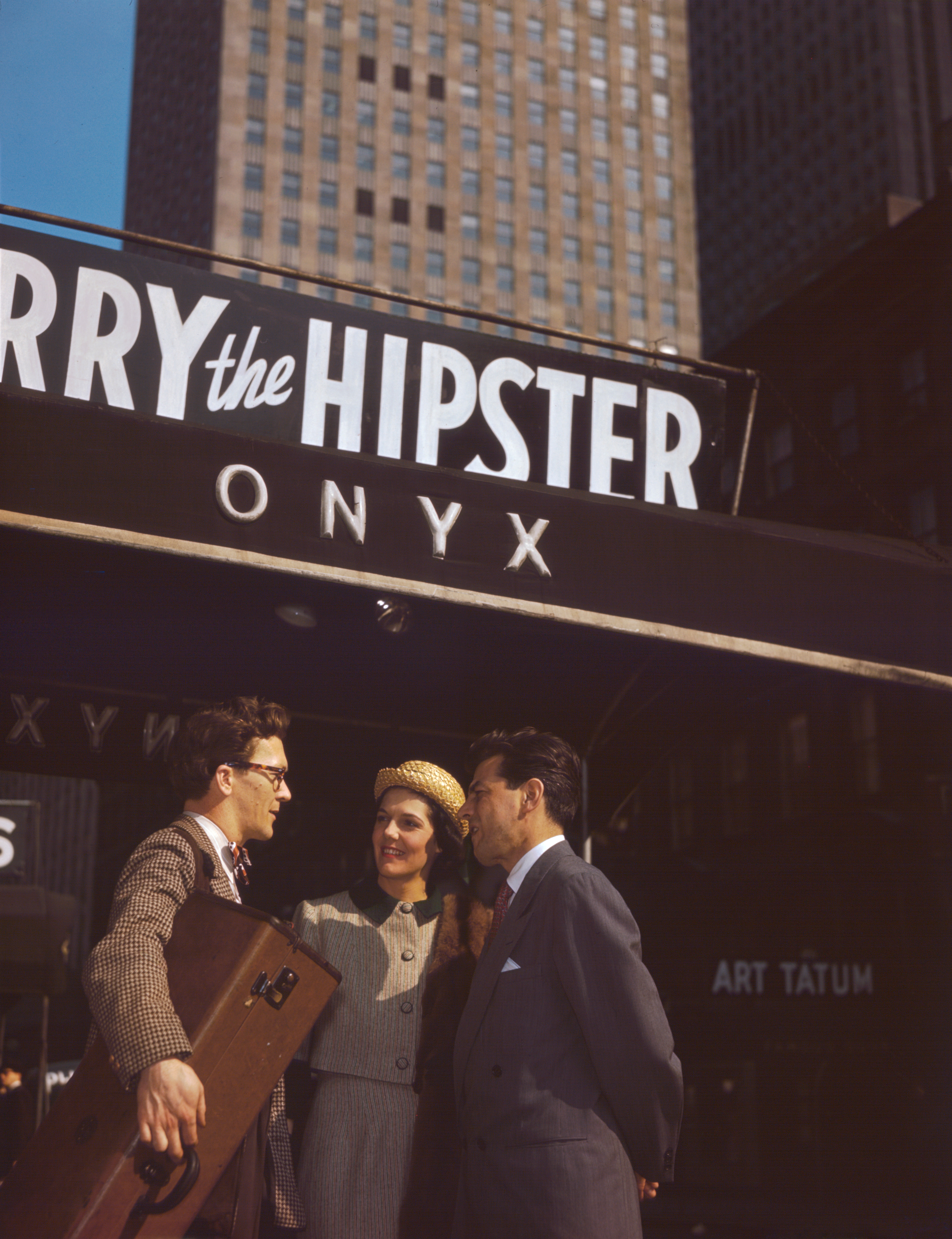
- From left: Toots Thielemans, Adele Girard, and Joe Marsala in front of the Onyx of New York City, c. 1948
- Map showing former locations
- Address: West 52nd Street; New York City; United States
- Owner: Joe Helbock (1927–1939) Irving Alexander, Jack A. Colt, Mac Rosen, Arthur Jarwood, Chauncey Samuel Olman (57 West 52nd Street; 1942–1949)
- Type: Jazz club

Construction
- Opened: 1927
- Reopened: July 13, 1935
- Rebuilt: 1935
- Years active: 1927–1939; 1942–1949

The Onyx Club was a jazz club located on West 52nd Street in New York City.

== History ==
35 West 52nd Street (1927–1934)
The Onyx Club opened in 1927 at 35 West 52nd Street as a speakeasy under bootlegger Joe Helbock (né Joseph Jerome Helbock; 1896–1973).
72 West 52nd Street (1934–1937)
In February of 1934, after the end of prohibition, the Onyx Club became an authorized club in a new location at 72 West 52nd Street. The Onyx featured musicians including the Spirits of Rhythm and Art Tatum, who then was the regular intermission pianist. It burned down in 1935. Helbock rebuilt it, and on July 13, 1935, reopened it with Red McKenzie, Stuff Smith, Jonah Jones, John Kirby, Maxine Sullivan, and others.
62 West 52nd Street (1937–1939)
It moved to 62 West 52nd Street and closed in 1939, due partly to a fallout with a silent partner, guitarist Carl Kress.
57 West 52nd Street (1942–1949)
In 1942, a new Onyx Club, unrelated to the original, opened at 57 West 52nd Street and flourished as a jazz venue featuring Art Tatum, Red Allen, Cozy Cole, Roy Eldridge, Ben Webster, Billie Holiday, Charlie Parker, Dizzy Gillespie, and Sarah Vaughan. The owners included Irving Alexander (1908–1987), Jack A. Colt (1905–1970), Mac Rosen, Arthur Jarwood (1907–1998), and Chauncey Samuel Olman (1908–1965). The group, at varying degrees, was involved in the ownership of Kelly's Stable, Downbeat, Three Deuces, and the Door. Olman, an attorney for musicians and composers, was the brother of band leader Val Olman (1913–2006). The venue, under the same name, became a strip club in 1949.
