= List of works by Milt Hinton =

This is a list of works by American jazz musician Milt Hinton.

== As leader ==
78s include:

- "Everywhere" and "Beefsteak Charlie" (Keynote 639): rec. 1945
- "And Say It Again" (Staff 604): rec. 1947
- "Just Plain Blues" (Staff 605): rec. 1947
- "If You Believed in Me" (Staff 606): rec. 1947
- "Meditation Jeffonese" (Staff 608): rec. 1947

LPs include:

- Milt Hinton: East Coast Jazz 5 (Bethlehem BCP10): rec. 1955
- Basses Loaded (RCA LPM1107): rec. 1955
- The Rhythm Section (Epic LN3271): rec. 1956
- Percussion and Bass (Everest BR5110): rec. 1960 with Jo Jones
- Here Swings the Judge (Famous Door HL104): rec. 1964 and 1975
- Bassically with Blue (Black and Blue 33096): rec. 1976
- The Trio (Chiaroscuro CR188): rec. 1977
- Just the Two of Us (Muse 5279): rec. 1981
- The Judge's Decision (Exposure 6231910): rec. 1984

CDs include:

- Back to Bass-ics (Progressive PCD7084): rec. 1984
- Hayward and Hinton (Town Crier TCD514): rec. 1987
- The Basement Tapes (Chiaroscuro CRD222): rec. 1989 and 1990
- Old Man Time (Chiaroscuro CRD310): rec. 1989 and 1990
- Marian McPartland's Piano Jazz with Guest Milt Hinton (Jazz Alliance 12016): rec. 1991
- The Trio 1994 (Chiaroscuro CRD322): rec. 1994
- Laughing at Life (Columbia CK66454): rec. 1994
- The Judge at His Best: The Legendary Chiaroscuro Sessions, 1973-1995 (Chiaroscuro CRD219): rec. 1973-1995

=== As sideman ===
With Louis Bellson and Gene Krupa

- The Mighty Two (Roulette, 1963)

With Tony Bennett

- The Beat of My Heart (Columbia, 1957)
- Hometown, My Town (Columbia, 1959)
- My Heart Sings (Columbia, 1961)
- Tony Makes It Happen (Columbia, 1967)
- Snowfall: The Tony Bennett Christmas Album (Columbia, 1968)
- I've Gotta Be Me (Columbia, 1969)

With Teresa Brewer

- We Love You Fats (Doctor Jazz, 1978)
- Memories of Louis (Red Baron, 1991)

With Bob Brookmeyer

- Brookmeyer (Vik, 1956)
- Jazz Concerto Grosso (ABC-Paramount, 1957) with Gerry Mulligan and Phil Sunkel

With John Benson Brooks

- Alabama Concerto (Riverside, 1958) – with Cannonball Adderley

With Clarence "Gatemouth" Brown

- Heatwave (Black & Blue, 1977)

With Ruth Brown

- Late Date with Ruth Brown (Atlantic, 1959)

With Kenny Burrell

- Blue Bash! (Verve, 1963) – with Jimmy Smith

With Benny Carter

- Wonderland (Pablo, 1986)

With Buck Clayton

- Jumpin' at the Woodside (Columbia, 1955)
- All the Cats Join In (Columbia, 1956)

With Jimmy Cleveland

- Rhythm Crazy (EmArcy, 1964)

With Al Cohn

- Mr. Music (RCA Victor, 1955)
- The Natural Seven (RCA Victor, 1955)
- That Old Feeling (RCA Victor, 1955)
- From A to...Z (RCA Victor, 1956) with Zoot Sims
- The Sax Section (Epic, 1956)
- Cohn on the Saxophone (Dawn, 1956)

With Sam Cooke

- Swing Low (RCA Victor, 1961)

With Freddy Cole

- Waiter, Ask the Man to Play the Blues (Dot, 1964)

With Bobby Darin

- That's All (Atco, 1959)

With Joey DeFrancesco

- Where Were You? (Columbia, 1990)

With Paul Desmond

- Desmond Blue (RCA Victor, 1961)

With Dion DiMucci

- Runaround Sue (Laurie Records, 1961)

With Jean DuShon

- Feeling Good (Cadet, 1965)

With Ricky Ford

- Manhattan Blues (Candid, 1989)
- Ebony Rhapsody (Candid, 1990)
- American-African Blues (Candid, 1991)

With Aretha Franklin

- Aretha: With The Ray Bryant Combo (Columbia, 1961)

With Curtis Fuller

- Images of Curtis Fuller (Savoy, 1960)
- Cabin in the Sky (Impulse!, 1962)

With Dizzy Gillespie

- The Complete RCA Victor Recordings (Bluebird, 1995)

With Steve Goodman

- Say It in Private (Asylum Records, 1977)

With Freddie Green

- Mr. Rhythm (RCA Victor, 1955)

With Dodo Greene

- My Hour of Need (Blue Note, 1962)

With Al Grey

- Struttin' and Shoutin' (Columbia, 1983)

With Gigi Gryce

- Gigi Gryce (MetroJazz, 1958)

With Lionel Hampton

- You Better Know It!!! (Impulse!, 1965)

With Cass Harrison

- Wrappin' It Up (MGM, 1957)

With Johnny Hartman

- All of Me: The Debonair Mr. Hartman (Bethlehem, 1957)
- I Just Dropped by to Say Hello (Impulse!, 1964)

With Coleman Hawkins

- Timeless Jazz (Jazztone, 1954)
- The Hawk in Hi Fi (RCA Victor, 1956)
- Jazz Reunion (Candid, 1961) with Pee Wee Russell

With Woody Herman

- Songs for Hip Lovers (Verve, 1957)

With Johnny Hodges

- Sandy's Gone (Verve, 1963)
- Con-Soul & Sax (RCA Victor, 1965) with Wild Bill Davis
- Triple Play (RCA Victor, 1967)
- Don't Sleep in the Subway (Verve, 1967)

With John Lee Hooker

- It Serve You Right to Suffer (Impulse! Records, 1966)

With Langston Hughes

- Weary Blues (MGM, 1958)

With Milt Jackson

- The Ballad Artistry of Milt Jackson (Atlantic, 1959)

With Willis Jackson

- Cool "Gator" (Prestige, 1960)
- Blue Gator (Prestige, 1960)
- Cookin' Sherry (Prestige, 1960)
- Together Again! (Prestige, 1965) - with Jack McDuff
- Together Again, Again (Prestige, 1966) - with Jack McDuff

With Joni James

- Songs by Victor Young and Songs by Frank Loesser (MGM, 1956)

With Budd Johnson

- French Cookin' (Argo, 1963)

With J. J. Johnson and Kai Winding

- K + J.J. (Bethlehem, 1955)
- Jay and Kai (Columbia, 1957)

With Elvin Jones

- Time Capsule (Vanguard, 1977)

With Etta Jones

- Etta Jones Sings (Roulette, 1965)
- I'll Be Seeing You (Muse, 1987)

With Hank Jones

- The Talented Touch (Capitol, 1958)
- Porgy and Bess (Capitol, 1958)
- Here's Love (Argo, 1963)
- This Is Ragtime Now! (ABC-Paramount, 1964)

With Quincy Jones

- The Birth of a Band! (Mercury, 1959)
- Quincy Jones Explores the Music of Henry Mancini (Mercury, 1964)
- Golden Boy (Mercury, 1964)
- Quincy Plays for Pussycats (Mercury, 1965)

With Alex Kallao

- An Evening at the Embers (RCA Victor, 1954)

With Eddie Kendricks

- Vintage '78 (Arista, 1978)

With Morgana King

- With a Taste of Honey (Mainstream, 1964)
- Miss Morgana King (Reprise, 1965)
- A Taste of Honey (Mainstream, 1971)

With Barbara Lewis

- It's Magic (Atlantic, 1966)

With Mundell Lowe

- New Music of Alec Wilder (Riverside, 1956)

With Johnny Lytle

- Got That Feeling! (Riverside, 1963)

With Herbie Mann

- Love and the Weather (Bethlehem, 1956)
- Our Mann Flute (Atlantic, 1966)

With Branford Marsalis

- Trio Jeepy (CBS Records, 1989)

With Johnny Mathis

- Johnny Mathis (Columbia, 1956)
- Open Fire, Two Guitars (Columbia, 1959)

With Howard McGhee

- Music from the Connection (Felsted, 1960)

With Jay McShann

- The Last of the Blue Devils (Atlantic, 1978)
- Some Blues (Chiaroscuro, 1993)

With Helen Merrill

- Helen Merrill (EmArcy, 1954)
- Helen Merrill with Strings (EmArcy, 1955)
- Merrill at Midnight (EmArcy, 1957)
- American Country Songs (Atco, 1959)
- You've Got a Date with the Blues (MetroJazz, 1959)

With Bette Midler

- The Divine Miss M (Atlantic Records, 1972)
- Bette Midler (Atlantic Records, 1973)
- Songs for the New Depression (Atlantic Records, 1976)

With Charles Mingus

- Charles Mingus and Friends in Concert (Columbia, 1972)
- The Complete Town Hall Concert (Blue Note, 1994)

With Willie Nelson

- Across the Borderline (Columbia, 1993)

With Joe Newman

- All I Wanna Do Is Swing (RCA Victor, 1955)
- New Sounds in Swing (Jazztone, 1956) with Billy Byers
- I Feel Like a Newman (Storyville, 1956)

With Esther Phillips

- And I Love Him! (Atlantic, 1966)

With John Pizzarelli

- My Blue Heaven (Chesky, 1990)

With Ike Quebec

- Heavy Soul (Blue Note, 1961)
- It Might as Well Be Spring (Blue Note, 1961)
- Easy Living (Blue Note, 1962)

With Della Reese

- Melancholy Baby (Jubilee, 1957)

With Irene Reid

- It's Only the Beginning (MGM, 1963)

With Leon Redbone

- On the Track (Warner Bros., 1975)
- Double Time (Warner Bros., 1977)

With Jess Roden

- The Player Not the Game (Island, 1977)

With Jordan Sandke

- Rhythm Is Our Business (Stash, 1985)

With Neil Sedaka

- Rock with Sedaka (RCA Victor, 1959)

With Zoot Sims

- The Modern Art of Jazz by Zoot Sims (Dawn, 1956)
- Nirvana (Groove Merchant, 1974) with Bucky Pizzarelli and special guest Buddy Rich

With Frank Sinatra

- The World We Knew (Reprise, 1967)

With Rex Stewart and Cootie Williams

- The Big Challenge (Jazztone, 1957)
- Porgy & Bess Revisited (Warner Bros., 1959)

With Sonny Stitt

- Broadway Soul (Colpix, 1965)
- The Matadors Meet the Bull (Roulette, 1965)
- I Keep Comin' Back! (Roulette, 1966)

With Ralph Sutton

- Last of the Whorehouse Piano Players (Chaz Jazz, 1980) with Jay McShann - originally released on 2 LPs as The Last of the Whorehouse Piano Players: Two Pianos Vol. I & Vol. II
- Last of the Whorehouse Piano Players (Chiaroscuro, 1989), with Jay McShann
- Remembered (Arbors Records, 2004) with Ruby Braff

With Sylvia Syms

- Sylvia Is! (Prestige, 1965)

With Buddy Tate

- Buddy Tate and His Buddies (Chiaroscuro, 1973)

With Clark Terry

- The Happy Horns of Clark Terry (Impulse!, 1964)

With Ben Webster

- The Soul of Ben Webster (Verve, 1958)

With Joe Wilder

- The Pretty Sound (Columbia, 1959)

With Joe Williams

- Me and the Blues (RCA Victor, 1964)

With Teddy Wilson

- The Creative Teddy Wilson (Norgran, 1955) - also released as For Quiet Lovers
- The Teddy Wilson Trio & Gerry Mulligan Quartet with Bob Brookmeyer at Newport (Verve, 1957)

With Kai Winding

- Dance to the City Beat (Columbia, 1959)

== Select photographic exhibitions ==
Date	Location	Exhibition Title
Jan. 30 - April 25, 2015	Marshall Fine Arts Center, Haverford College, Haverford, PA	An Exhibition of African American Photographers from the Daguerrian to the Digital Eras
June 2014 – present	Conservatory Lounge, Oberlin College Conservatory, Oberlin, OH	The Way I See It: The Photographs of Milt Hinton
Aug. - Dec. 2014	Allen Memorial Art Museum, Oberlin College, Oberlin, OH	An Insider's Lens: The Jazz Photography of Milt Hinton
April 4 - Sept. 7, 2014	Yale University Art Gallery, New Haven, CT	Jazz Lives: The Photographs of Lee Friedlander and Milt Hinton
Jan. 24 - March 4, 2013	St. Peter's Church, New York, NY	Milt Hinton: Inside Jazz (PrezFest 2013 Legend Wall)
Nov. 11 - Dec. 12, 2011	Baruch College, New York, NY	Milt Hinton's Jazz Photographs: Classics and Works in Color
Nov. 4 - Dec. 8, 2010	Holyoke Center - Harvard University, Cambridge, MA	Witnessing Jazz: Photographs by Milt Hinton
Dec. 4, 2009 - Feb. 28, 2010	Westport Arts Center, Westport, CT	The Judge: Jazz Photographs by Milt Hinton
Nov. 7, 2008 - Jan. 11, 2009	Chattanooga African American Museum, Chattanooga, TN	Playing the Changes: The Jazz Photographs of Milt Hinton
May 29 - June 19, 2008	Jacob Burns Film Center, Pleasantville, NY	Playing the Changes: Milt Hinton's Life in Stories and Photographs
Feb. 8 - March 5, 2008	Sidney Mishkin Gallery, Baruch College of the City University of New York	Playing the Changes: Milt Hinton's Life in Stories and Photographs
April 2007	Jacksonville Jazz Festival, Jacksonville, FL	A Jazz Odyssey: a Retrospective of Photographs by Milt Hinton
Nov. 10, 2006 - Jan. 29, 2007	STAX Museum of American Soul Music, Memphis, TN	Milt Hinton: All That Jazz - A Behind the Scenes View of Jazz in the 20th Century
July 10 - Sept. 6, 2006	National Underground Railroad Freedom Center, Cincinnati, OH	Keeping Time: Milt Hinton's Jazz Photographs
April 2005	Bern Jazz Festival, Bern, Switzerland	
Feb. 2005	Dickinson College, Carlisle, PA	Through the Viewfinder: Milt Hinton's World of Jazz
Jan. 27 - April 10, 2005	Hamilton College, Clinton, NY	The Music Stand: Jazz as a Unifying Social Force
Oct. - Nov. 2004	Salzburg Festival, Salzburg, Austria	
Sept. 2004	Bloomfield College, Bloomfield, NJ	From the Out House to the White House: The Jazz Photographs of Milt Hinton
May 15 - June 11, 2004	WBGO Gallery, Newark, NJ	The Photographs of Milt Hinton
May 2003	Banning Gallery (Tribeca Film Festival), Banning, CA	Keeping Time: The Jazz Photographs of Milt Hinton
Dec. 2001	Hofstra University, Hempstead, NY	Milt Hinton: Photographs of Jazz Artists
May - Sept. 2001	Fullerton Museum Center, Fullerton, CA	Bebop & Hi-Fi: Photographing Jazz
July 2001	The North Seas Jazz Festival, The Hague, The Netherlands	
Nov. 5 - Dec. 11, 2001	Sidney Mishkin Gallery, Baruch College of the City University of New York	Milt Hinton: A Memorial Exhibition of his Jazz Photographs 1938-1986
Sept. - Nov. 1998	Flushing Town Hall, Flushing, NY	Milton Hinton: A Tribute (curated by Marc Miller)
Feb. 6 - March 4, 1997	Sidney Mishkin Gallery, Baruch College of the City University of New York	Jazz Odyssey: A Retrospective of Photographs by Milt Hinton
June - July 1997	The Corcoran Gallery of Art, Washington, D.C.	Keeping Time: Photographs of Musicians by John Cohen and Milt Hinton
April - July 1997	The Smithsonian Institution, Anacostia Center, Washington, D.C.	Life on the Road: The Photographs of Milton J. Hinton
Feb. 1 - April 7, 1997	New York State Museum, Albany, NY	Jazz Shots: The Photographs of Milt Hinton
May - June 1996	Providence St. Mel School, Chicago, IL	
Jan. 13 - March 31, 1996	Addison Gallery of American Art, Andover, MA	Firsthand in the Jazz World: Photographs of American Musicians by Milton Hinton
Sept. 13 - Oct. 20, 1996	Nevada Museum of Art, Reno, NV	The Jazz Photographs of Milt Hinton
July 1996	Musikhauset Aarhus, Copenhagen	Photographs by Milt Hinton
March 1996	Walt Whitman Arts & Cultural Center, Camden, NJ	The Jazz Photographs of Milt Hinton
Feb. 1996	Ben Shahn Gallery, William Paterson College, Wayne, NJ	The Photographs of Milt Hinton
Feb. 1996	Massachusetts Historical Society, Boston, MA	The Milton J. Hinton Photographic Collection
May 13 - July 2, 1995	Mendel Art Gallery, Saskatoon, Saskatchewan, Canada	Milt Hinton - Jazz Photographs
March -April 1995	Michigan State University, Lansing, MI	Photographs by Milt Hinton
Sept. 1994	Monterey Jazz Festival, Monterey, CA	
Jan. - Feb. 1994	University of Virginia, Charlottesville, VA	Jazz Photographs by Milt Hinton
Sept.- Oct. 1993	Beach Institute African American Cultural Center, Savannah, GA	An Insider's Perspective
Feb. - March 1993	The Rose Art Museum, Brandeis University, Waltham, MA	The Photographs of Milt Hinton
Feb. 12 - March 9, 1992	Sidney Mishkin Gallery, Baruch College of the City University of New York, NY	Jazz Odyssey: Photographs by Milt Hinton 1930-1980
July 6 - Oct. 13, 1991	Denver Museum of Art, Denver, CO	Bass Line: The Photographs of Milt Hinton
Sept. 27 - Nov. 8, 1991	Emerson Gallery, Hamilton College, Clinton, NY	Portraits in Jazz: Photographs by Milt Hinton
Jan. - Feb. 1991	Rhode Island School of Design, Providence, RI	Milt Hinton: Photographs
1991-1999	Le FNAC, Paris, France	Milt Hinton, Legende du Jazz (traveling exhibition at store galleries in France, Belgium, and Germany)
March 21 - April 4, 1991	Rochester Institute of Technology, Rochester, NY	
Jan. 8 - July 12, 1991	Detroit Historical Museum, Detroit, MI	The Life and Photographs of Milt Hinton, Jazz Musician
Sept. 11 - Oct. 21, 1990	The Art Gallery, University of New Hampshire, Durham, NH	A View from the Bass Line: Jazz Photographs By Milt Hinton
Jan. - March 1990	Aetna Life and Casualty Company, Hartford, CT	The Life and Photographs of Milt Hinton, Jazz Musician
April 15 - May 28, 1988	Pensacola Museum of Art, Pensacola, FL	Milt Hinton: Five Decades of Jazz Photographs
March 4 - April 4, 1988	Newark City Hall, Newark, NJ	Milt Hinton's Jazz Legends
Jan. 31 - March 25, 1988	CRT's Craftery Gallery, Hartford, CT	All That Jazz
July 1986	Edinburgh Festival, Edinburgh, Scotland	On the Road
July 1986	The 92nd Street YMHA, New York, NY	On the Road (also exhibits in July 1989, July 1998, and July 2001)
June - July 1986	Mellon Bank Center, Philadelphia, PA	A Jazz Master Documents Fifty Years of American Music (also exhibited at the Mellon Bank Center Pittsburgh, PA, June 1987)
Dec. 17, 1985 - Jan. 14, 1986	Gallery, Parsons School of Design, New York, NY	On the Road: 50 Years of Jazz Photographs By Milt Hinton
March - April 1985	Sordoni Art Gallery, Wilkes College, Wilkes-Barre, PA	
Jan. 29 - Feb. 24, 1985	Midwest Museum of American Art, Elkhart, IN	Images of Jazz
June 1981	Cava Gallery, Philadelphia, PA	Milt Hinton's Photographs (Hinton's first one-person show)
