= My Hour of Need =

1963 studio album

Studio album by Dodo Greene accompanied by the Ike Quebec Quintet
- Released: 1963
- Recorded: April 2 & 17, 1962
- Studios: Van Gelder Studio, Englewood Cliffs, NJ
- Genre: Jazz
- Length: 58:31 CD reissue with additional tracks
- Labels: Blue Note; BLP/BST 9001
- Producer: Alfred Lion

Dodo Greene chronology
Ain't What You Do (1959)	My Hour of Need (1963)

Ike Quebec chronology
Easy Living (1962)	My Hour of Need (1962)	Soul Samba (1962)

My Hour of Need is an album by jazz vocalist Dodo Greene featuring performances accompanied by the Ike Quebec Quintet recorded in 1962 and released on the Blue Note label. The 1996 Connoisseur Series limited edition CD reissue features another six previously unissued tracks recorded at later sessions for a proposed follow-up album.

== Reception ==
The Allmusic review by Scott Yanow stated: "This set was a very unusual release for Blue Note. Greene's mixture of R&B and soulful blues in a voice very reminiscent of late-period Dinah Washington is much more pop and blues-oriented than the music on any other Blue Note release from the period. ... In reality, the main reason to acquire the relaxed set is for the warm tenor of Ike Quebec (who is perfect in this setting) and the occasional guitar of Grant Green. A true obscurity".

== Track listing ==
1. "My Hour of Need" (Ira Kosloff) – 4:54
2. "Trouble in Mind" (Richard M. Jones) – 4:45
3. "You Are My Sunshine" (Jimmie Davis, Charles Mitchell) – 3:00
4. "I'll Never Stop Loving You" (Nicholas Brodszky, Sammy Cahn) – 4:01
5. "I Won't Cry Anymore" (Al Frisch, Fred Wise) – 3:45
6. "Lonesome Road" (Nathaniel Shilkret, Gene Austin) – 4:13
7. "Let There Be Love" (Lionel Rand, Ian Grant) – 3:28
8. "There Must Be a Way" (David Saxon, Sammy Gallop) – 3:29
9. "Down by the Riverside" (Duke Jordan) – 4:06
10. "Little Things Mean a Lot" (Carl Stutz, Edith Lindeman) – 4:06

Bonus tracks on 1996 CD reissue:

11. "You Don't Know Me" (Cindy Walker, Eddy Arnold) – 2:44
12. "Not One Tear" (Johnny Bell) – 3:03
13. "I Hear" (Irvin Duke) – 3:37
14. "Time After Time" (Jule Styne, Sammy Cahn) – 3:32
15. "Everybody's Happy But Me" (Jeannie Cheatham, Mattie Fields) – 3:10
16. "Jazz in My Soul" – 2:38
- Recorded at Van Gelder Studio on April 2, 1962 (tracks 2, 7, 9 & 10), April 17, 1962 (tracks 1, 3–6 & 8), September 24, 1962 (tracks 11–14) and November 2, 1962 (tracks 15 & 16)

== Personnel ==
- Dodo Greene – vocals
- Ike Quebec – tenor saxophone
- Grant Green – guitar
- Eddie Chamblee – tenor saxophone (tracks 11–14)
- Edwin Swanston (tracks 11–14), Sir Charles Thompson (tracks 1–10) – organ
- John Acea – piano (tracks 15 & 16)
- Milt Hinton (tracks 2, 7, 9 & 10), Herbie Lewis (tracks 1, 3–6 & 8), Wendell Marshall (tracks 11–16) – bass
- Jual Curtis (tracks 11–16), Al Harewood (tracks 2, 7, 9 & 10), Billy Higgins (tracks 1, 3–6 & 8) – drums
