= The Complete Blue Note 45 Sessions =

Compilation album by Ike Quebec
- Released: October 4, 2005
- Recorded: July 1, 1959 (1–8); Van Gelder Studio, Hackensack; September 25, 1960 (9–13; CD2 1–4); February 5, 1962 (CD2 5–8); February 13, 1962 (CD2 9–13); Van Gelder Studio, Englewood Cliffs
- Genre: Jazz
- Length: 125:58
- Label: Blue Note; Blue Note 11441
- Producer: Alfred Lion

Ike Quebec chronology
The Complete Blue Note 45 Sessions (2005)	Heavy Soul (1961)

Professional ratings
Review scores
Source	Rating
Allmusic	5/5 stars

The Complete Blue Note 45 Sessions is a compilation album by American saxophonist Ike Quebec. The album focuses on Quebec's 45 RPMs recorded between 1959 and 1962 and aimed at the juke box market. The songs were successful, marking the start of a comeback for the saxophonist who had fallen into obscurity since his early career in 1940s.

The compilation was first issued on Mosaic MR3/MD2-121 in 1988, then re-released on a now out-of-print Blue Note CD in 2005. Despite the fact this is a compilation, all the pieces couldn't be found anywhere else at the time of the release, and still remain so, not counting From Hackensack to Englewood Cliffs which, however, includes only a part of this collection.

The July 1 session marks the last day of recording at the original Van Gelder Studio, based in Hackensack. Van Gelder would move the studio to Englewood Cliffs soon after.

== Background ==
In the early 1950s, the jukebox was becoming a fundamental way to foster jazz, and record companies were aware of that. Blue Note had just experienced an amazing success thanks to Horace Silver's hit "The Preacher"/"Doodlin'" (BN 1630). Producer Alfred Lion, astonished by the popularity the 45 had gained, decided to invest more in recordings primarily intended for 45 rpm releases. At some point, he chose to issue Quebec's "Blue Harlem", a piece recorded in 1944. It became an unexpected hit, "the sort of record that any bar in a black neighborhood wanted on its jukebox". After the success of these 45s, Quebec went on to record several full-length albums for Blue Note before he died in 1963.

== Track listing ==
All compositions by Ike Quebec, unless otherwise noted.

CD 1

1. "A Light Reprieve" - 4:39
2. "The Buzzard Lope" - 6:17 (BN 1749)
3. "Blue Monday" (Fisher, Sharp, Singleton) - 5:05 (BN 1748)
4. "Zonky" (Edwin Swanston) - 4:34
5. "Later for the Rock" - 4:37
6. "Sweet and Lovely" (Gus Arnheim, Harry Tobias, Jules LeMare) - 4:19
7. "Dear John" - 6:53 (BN 1748)
8. "Blue Friday" (Swanston) - 5:05 (BN 1749)
9. "Everything Happens to Me" [Short Version] (Adair, Dennis) - 4:32 (BN 1804)
10. "Mardi Gras" - 6:13 (BN 1804)
11. "What a Diff'rence a Day Makes" (Grever) - 4:07 (BN 1802)
12. "For All We Know" (Coots, Lewis) - 4:12 (BN 1805)
13. "Ill Wind" (Arlen, Koehler - 6:13 (BN 1805)

CD 2

1. "If I Could Be with You" (Creamer, Johnson) - 6:03 (BN 1803)
2. "I've Got the World on a String" (Arlen, Koehler) - 5:34 (BN 1802)
3. "Me 'N' Mabe" - 5:12 (BN 1803)
4. "Everything Happens to Me" [Long Version] (Adair, Dennis) - 6:38
5. "All of Me" (Marks, Simons) - 2:58 (BN 1840)
6. "Intermezzo" (Henning, Provost) - 3:45 (BN 1840)
7. "But Not for Me" (Gershwin, Gershwin) - 3:45 (BN 1841)
8. "All the Way" (Cahn, Van Heusen) - 3:55 (BN 1841)
9. "How Long Has This Been Going On" (Gershwin, Gershwin) - 5:59
10. "With a Song in My Heart" (Hart, Rodgers) - 3:56
11. "Imagination" (Burke, Van Heusen) - 5:09
12. "What Is There to Say" (Duke, Harburg) - 4:33
13. "There Is No Greater Love" (Jones, Symes) - 4:45

== Personnel ==
CD 1: tracks 1–8

- Ike Quebec - tenor saxophone
- Edwin Swanston - organ
- Clifton "Skeeter" Best - guitar
- Charles "Sonny" Wellesley - bass
- Les Jenkins - drums

CD 1: tracks 9–13; CD 2: tracks 1–4

- Ike Quebec - tenor saxophone
- Sir Charles Thompson - organ
- Milt Hinton - bass
- J.C. Heard - drums

CD 2: tracks 5–8

- Ike Quebec - tenor saxophone
- Earl Van Dyke - organ
- Willie Jones - guitar
- Wilbert Hogan - drums

CD 2: tracks 9–13

- Ike Quebec - tenor saxophone
- Earl Van Dyke - organ
- Willie Jones - guitar
- Sam Jones - bass
- Wilbert Hogan - drums

== Charts ==
=== Monthly charts ===
2025 monthly chart performance for The Complete Blue Note 45 Sessions
Chart (2025)	Peak position
Croatia International Albums (HDU)	39
German Jazz Albums (Offizielle Top 100)	3
