= Blue and Sentimental =

Song written by Count Basie

Blue and Sentimental is a song written by Count Basie, Jerry Livingston, and Mack David. It was written in 1938 and recorded by the Count Basie Orchestra on June 6th of that year.

== Other recordings ==
- 1947 – Count Basie recorded the song again on October 19, 1947 for RCA Victor Records (catalog No. 2602) with a vocal by Bob Bailey and it charted briefly in 1948.
- 1947 - The King Cole Trio recorded November 24, 1947.
- 1952 – The Mills Brothers (1952).
- 1958 – Michel Legrand recorded June 27, 1958, for his album Legrand Jazz, featuring Ben Webster on tenor saxophone.
- 1962 – the song was featured on saxophonist Ike Quebec's album Blue & Sentimental
- 2001 – Tony Bennett and Kay Starr for the album Playin' with My Friends: Bennett Sings the Blues
- 2023 – Larkin Poe for the compilation album Late Night Basie featuring Will Lee and Shawn Pelton
