= Skeeter Best =

American jazz guitarist

- Born: Clifton Best; November 20, 1914; Kinston, North Carolina, U.S.
- Died: May 27, 1985 New York
- Genres: Jazz
- Occupation: Musician
- Instrument: Guitar

Clifton "Skeeter" Best (November 20, 1914 – May 27, 1985) was an American jazz guitarist.

Best played in Philadelphia from 1935 to 1940, recording with Slim Marshall and Erskine Hawkins. In 1940, he joined Earl Hines's orchestra, playing with him until he joined the U.S. Navy in 1942. After the war, he played with Bill Johnson from 1945 to 1949. He toured East Asia with Oscar Pettiford in 1951 and 1952, and formed his own trio in the 1950s. He did a critically acclaimed session with Ray Charles and Milt Jackson in 1957 called Soul Brothers.

In 1958, he recorded with Mercer Ellington and taught in New York City. He also recorded with Harry Belafonte, Etta Jones, Nellie Lutcher, Milt Hinton, Osie Johnson, Paul Quinichette, Jimmy Rushing, Sonny Stitt, Charles Thompson, and Lucky Thompson.

== Discography ==
=== As sideman ===
- Eugenie Baird, Eugenie Baird Sings, Duke's Boys Play Ellington (Design, 1959)
- Aretha Franklin, Aretha: With The Ray Bryant Combo (Columbia, 1961)
- Bennie Green & Paul Quinichette, Blow Your Horn (Decca, 1956)
- Lionel Hampton, Silver Vibes (Columbia, 1960)
- Erskine Hawkins, 1938/1940 (EPM Musique, 1991)
- Earl Hines & Marva Josie, Jazz Is His Old Lady... and My Old Man (Catalyst, 1977)
- Mahalia Jackson, Gospels, Spirituals & Hymns (Columbia, 1991)
- Milt Jackson, Ballads & Blues (Atlantic, 1956)
- Milt Jackson & Ray Charles, Soul Brothers (Atlantic, 1958)
- Etta Jones, The Jones Girl.... Etta... Sings, Sings, Sings (King, 1958)
- Etta Jones, Don't Go to Strangers (Prestige, 1960)
- Frankie Laine & Buck Clayton, Jazz Spectacular (Columbia, 1956)
- Ellis Larkins, Blue and Sentimental (Decca, 1956)
- Howard McGhee, Maggie (Savoy, 1977)
- The Modern Jazz Sextet, The Modern Jazz Sextet (Norgran, 1956)
- Mel Powell, Out On a Limb (Vanguard, 1955)
- Ike Quebec, The Complete Blue Note 45 Sessions (Mosaic, 1987)
- Freddie Roach, The Freddie Roach Soul Book (Prestige, 1967)
- Jimmy Rushing, Rushing Lullabies (Columbia, 1959)
- Jimmy Rushing, The Jazz Odyssey of James Rushing Esq. (Columbia, 1957)
- Jimmy Rushing, Mr. Five by Five (Columbia, 1980)
- Charles Thompson, Sir Charles Thompson Trio (Vanguard, 1958)
- Charles Thompson, Rockin' Rhythm (Columbia, 1961)
- Lucky Thompson, Lucky Thompson Featuring Oscar Pettiford Vol. 1 (ABC-Paramount, 1956)
- Lucky Thompson, Vol. II (ABC-Paramount, 1957)
- Cootie Williams, Cootie Williams in Hi-Fi (RCA Victor, 1958)
