= Count Every Star =

Single by Ray Anthony and His Orchestra
- B-side: "The Darktown Strutters' Ball"
- Released: 1950
- Genre: Jazz
- Length: 3:01
- Label: Capitol
- Songwriter(s): Bruno Coquatrix, Sammy Gallop

Ray Anthony and His Orchestra singles chronology
"Autumn Nocturne" (1950)	"Count Every Star" (1950)	"Autumn Leaves" (1950)

"Count Every Star" is a song written by Bruno Coquatrix and Sammy Gallop and first released by Ray Anthony and His Orchestra. It reached number 4 on the US pop chart in 1950.

== Other charting versions ==
- Hugo Winterhalter released a version of the song as a single in 1950, when it reached number 10 on the US pop chart.
- Dick Haymes and Artie Shaw released a version of the song as a single in 1950, where it reached number 10 on the US pop chart.
- Linda Scott released a version of the song as a single in 1962, reaching number 10 on the US adult contemporary chart and number 41 on the Billboard pop chart.

== Other versions ==
- The Ravens released a version of the song as the B-side to their 1950 single "It's the Talk of the Town".
- The Lester Young Quartet released a version of the song as a single in 1954.
- Al Cohn released a version of the song on his 1954 album, Mr. Music.
- Bill Snyder released a version of the song as a single in 1954.
- Al Hibbler released a version of the song as part of an EP in 1956.
- Grant Green released a version of the song on his 1962 album, Born to Be Blue.
- Sonny Stitt released a version of the song on his 1958 album, Stitt's Bits.
- Ike Quebec released a version of the song on his 1961 album, Blue & Sentimental.
