= Mona Hinton =

American educator, music contractor, and bookkeeper

Mona Hinton

Edmonia "Mona" Caesar Clayton Hinton (1919–2008) was an educator, music contractor, and bookkeeper, as well as a business partner and advisor for her husband, the bassist and photographer Milt Hinton.

== Early life ==
Born in Centralia, Illinois, in 1919, Mona was the seventh of nine children of Nebuchadnezzar "Neb" Clayton and Rhoda (Bell) Clayton. She was born as her family was on the road moving from Okolona, Mississippi, to the north, relocating for better job opportunities as a part of the Great Migration of the time.

Mona grew up in Sandusky, Ohio, where the value of hard work was instilled in her from a young age. According to Mona, she had her first paying job by the age of 10, babysitting a family's children and handling their washing and ironing for $3 per week. After her father lost his job repairing train boilers during the Great Depression, everyone in the family was expected to contribute financially. Even so, money was extremely tight, and Mona recalls times when an apple or an orange would be divided nine ways for the children or when one pound of hot dogs would be stretched to feed a family of eleven.

Mona remembers her father as a very proud man who, even in the depths of the Great Depression, refused to accept any charity. He would regularly cut up old car tires and use the material to resole the children's shoes. Once after Mona's mother took the children to a relief center for food and used clothing, Neb insisted that they return the goods, telling the family, "We'll have to do without anything we can’t get on our own." These experiences helped instill in Mona the industriousness, determination, and discipline that would characterize the remainder of her life.

== The Chicago years ==
Hinton completed high school in Sandusky at the age of 16, after which she moved to Chicago to attend Poro Beauty School, a cosmetology school run by pioneering African-American entrepreneur Madam Annie Malone. Hinton graduated, returned to Sandusky, passed the licensing exam, and started working at a beauty parlor owned by one of her sisters. She soon realized that her true talents were in bookkeeping, not cosmetology, and she returned to Chicago to work as an assistant to Madam Malone.

When she left Sandusky, Mona's mother advised her, "You've known the church all your life. There are a lot of devils in the world, but the ones you’ll find in church are more likely nicer than what’s on the street." Mona took her mother's advice and quickly joined a church in Chicago where she sang in the church choir directed by Hilda Robinson, the mother of double bassist and photographer Milt Hinton. Milt and Mona first met on the Southside of Chicago at Milt's grandmother's funeral in 1939, and they were inseparable for the next sixty-one years.

== Traveling with the Cab Calloway Orchestra ==
In the early 1940s Mona began traveling with Milt on tours of the Cab Calloway Orchestra, where Milt was a bassist from 1936 through the early 1950s. Mona was the only musician's friend or spouse to travel with the band. She was a trusted confidant who was known for her discretion, and she quickly became a valuable resource for the musicians. When the band was crossing the country doing a series of one-nighters, Mona was instrumental in arranging lodging and food for the musicians. She would often go to the African-American section of town and find several women who were willing to cook for the band. She would pay for the food, organize the cooks, and have the food packed and delivered to the performance venue in time for intermission. Since this was the height of the Jim Crow era, and since many of the towns were too small to have hotels that allowed African Americans, Mona would frequently make arrangements for band members to sleep in local homes. She also helped musicians in the band manage their money, often insisting that they open savings accounts. As she put it, "I was like the den mother. I used to save their money — those who would drink and couldn’t handle it, I’d take their money away from them at night, and then when they got sober the next morning I'd return it to them."

Mona stayed on the road through the birth of her and Milt's only child, Charlotte, who was born on February 28, 1947. When traveling with a toddler became too difficult, the Hintons bought a two-family house in the Queens section of New York City, and ten years later they purchased a larger single-family home in an adjacent Queens neighborhood where they remained for the rest of their lives.

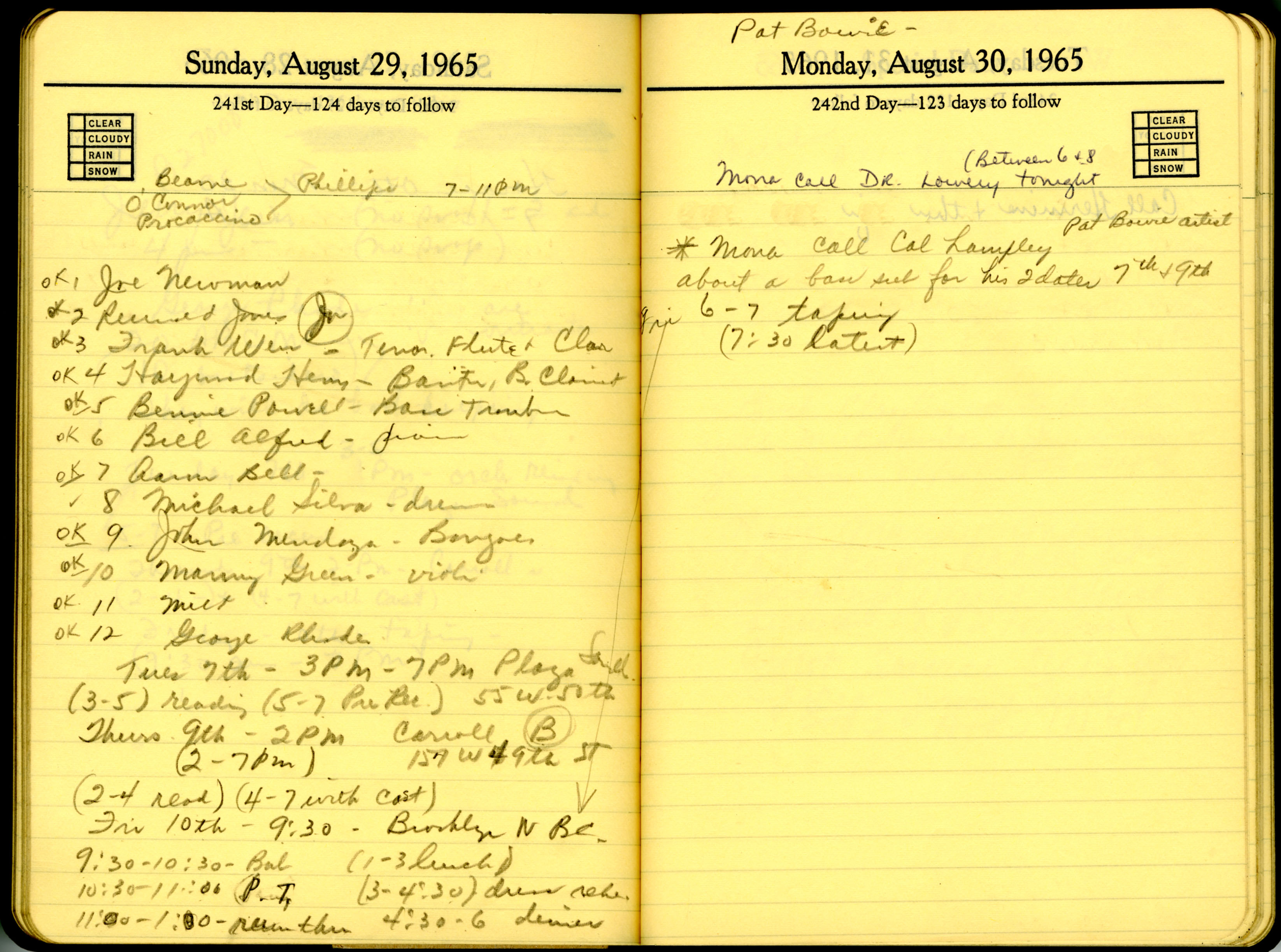
Mona Hinton's personal datebook (1965)

== Life in Queens, NY ==
After relocating to Queens, Mona continued to play a critical role in Milt's life and career. In addition to caring for their daughter, she handled all of the family's finances, and her attention to detail ensured the couple's financial security later in life. When Milt left the Calloway Orchestra in the early 1950s and began freelance work as a musician in New York, Mona kept track of Milt's work, scheduled interviews, coordinated public relations events, and often drove him back and forth to gigs (Milt never drove as an adult, due in part to a major car accident he was involved in as a teenager in Chicago). While waiting for Milt's late-night gigs to end, she would regularly socialize with musicians’ wives, most of whom were white due to the structural racism that was prominent in recording studios through much of the 1960s. She was known as being smart, articulate, and sophisticated and was able to find common ground with people from diverse backgrounds, putting everyone at ease.

In 1958, at her husband's request, Mona took the celebrated home movie footage (the only movie in existence) of the Esquire Magazine photo shoot on a Harlem brownstone stoop that was memorialized in Jean Bach's 1995 film, A Great Day in Harlem.

Although for many years Mona had made it a practice to enroll in occasional college-level courses, it was in the mid 1960s that she completed both a bachelor's and a master's degree from Queens College. She then taught remedial reading at two Queens elementary schools for eight years. As she recalled: "Every time I would feel mentally stagnant, I would just go take a course at Hunter or . . . any school downtown. And I loved anthropology, I took a lot of courses in that; I loved psychology and I took a lot of courses in that; anything that I felt like that I wanted to do. So it was not until later years that one of the teachers at Queens College talked me into matriculating. And I’m glad he did because when I did graduate, I graduated magna cum laude."

While working as a public school teacher, Mona would often invite students to her home on the weekends who were having difficulty with the topics. As she put it, this was "to introduce them to the concepts for the next week so they could cope. Milton would serve some milk and cookies and play music for them. It made such a difference in the lives of a lot of those children." Mona credited her parents with helping her understand the value of education for improving one's life, noting: "My parents always believed in education and I mean they made it a very, very important part of our lives."

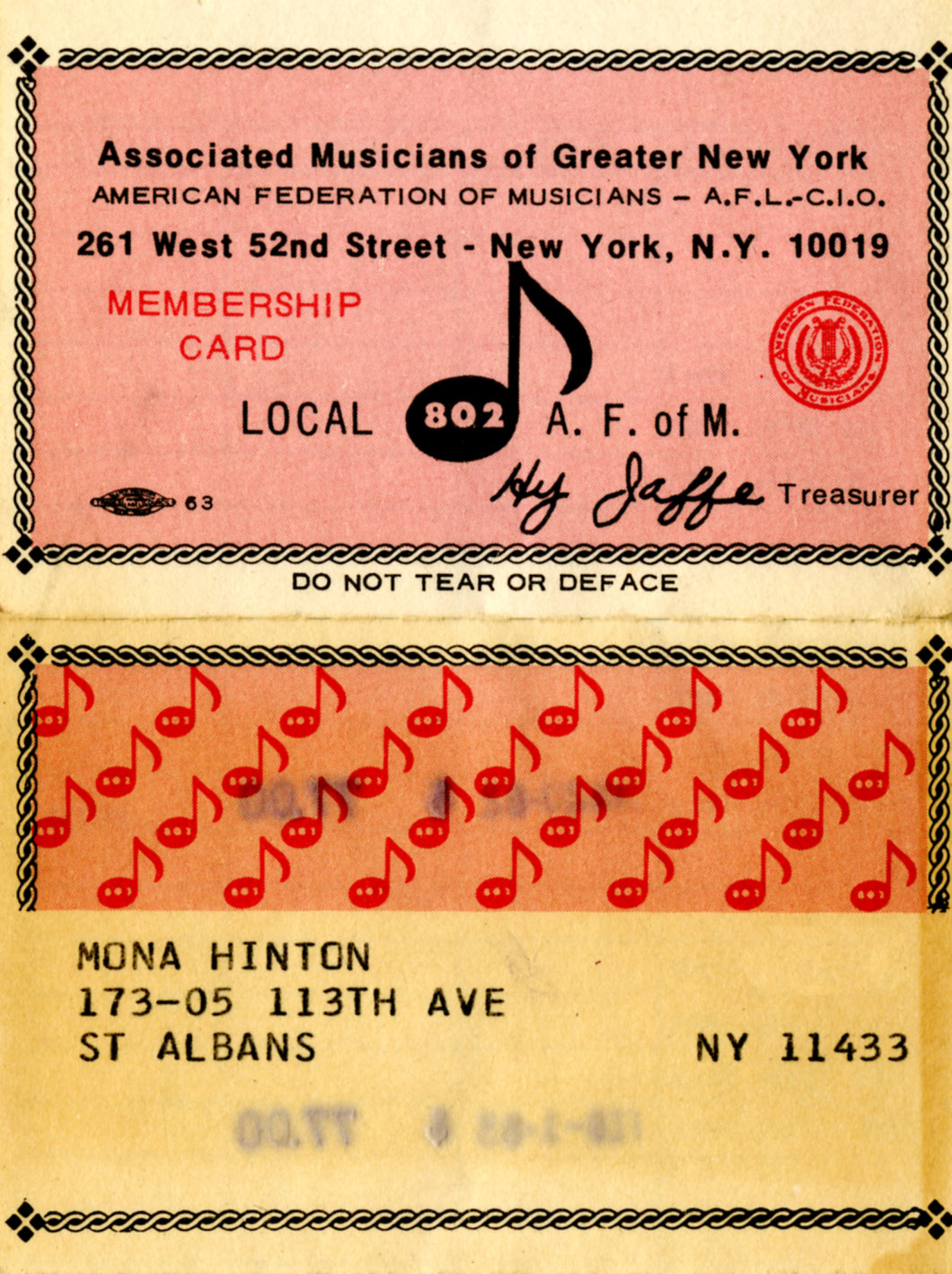
Mona Hinton's AFM Card (1982-83)

She retired from teaching in 1977 to begin traveling with Milt again and was regularly invited to join him at the jazz parties and festivals where he performed during that time. She traveled throughout the U.S. and Europe, and attended multiple events at the White House. At the same time, she was active as a music contractor for Lena Horne, Quincy Jones, Sammy Davis Jr, the Mills Brothers, and others. She also continued in the field of education as a substitute teacher into the 1980s.

== Writing and charity work ==
Over the years, Hinton also pursued several writing and translation projects. In 1970, for example, her translation of the poem “Two Countries” appeared in the anthology 3,000 Years of Black Poetry, edited by Alan Lomax and Raoul Abdul. In 1988, she began work on a book focused on highlighting the contributions that jazz musicians’ wives made to their husbands' careers. This grew in part out of her involvement with the New York chapter of the Rinkey-Dinks, a social and civic club active in the 1950s and 1960s that was made up primarily of the wives of New York musicians. The group included Ruth Bowen, Helen Darden, Barbara Jacquet, and Catherine Basie, among others. They held fund-raisers and conducted service projects that broadly benefited the local African-American community.

Mona was consistently involved in charity work, often with her close friend and neighbor Catherine Basie, wife of William "Count" Basie. In addition to their work with the Rinkey-Dinks, Mona and Catherine were active in the Urban League as well as the local chapter of the NAACP. As a result of the lifelong friendship between Mona and Catherine, Mona was named co-executor of both Catherine and William Basie's estates, and she was co-guardian to Diane, the Basies' daughter.

Along with Milt, she was also active in Queens-based community organizations, notably the St. Albans Congregational Church. Mona served for more than a decade as co-director of the New York Musician's Fund (a forerunner of the Jazz Foundation of America), an emergency fund established by George Wein which lends money to musicians who are in need. In 1993, several friends helped establish the Mona Clayton Hinton Academic and Cultural Excellence (A.C.E) Fund to further the educational opportunities for elementary and middle school children in her local St. Albans neighborhood of Queens, NY. The Fund focused on what Mona referred to as her Four Rs: Reading, Respect, Rights, and Responsibility.

Hinton was always well respected in the jazz community, and she and Milt were viewed by many as role models. In 1995, the Arizona Paradise Valley Jazz Party selected Mona as the first non-performer ever to be the "Guest of Honor" at the festival. She also received local and state-based awards including the African American Heritage Lifetime Achievement Award in 2001 from the state of New York and the Person of the Year Award in 2000 from the Sidney Bechet Society. Mona died on May 3, 2008, after a long illness.
