= From Hackensack to Englewood Cliffs =

Compilation album by Ike Quebec
- Released: January 1, 2000
- Recorded: July 1, 1959 (1–8); Van Gelder Studio, Hackensack; July 20, 1959 (9–10); Van Gelder Studio, Englewood Cliffs
- Genre: Jazz
- Length: 53:13
- Label: Blue Note; Blue Note 66083
- Producer: Alfred Lion

Professional ratings
Review scores
Source	Rating
AllMusic	4/5 stars

From Hackensack to Englewood Cliffs is a compilation album by American saxophonist Ike Quebec, released in 2000 on Blue Note. The album compiles eight jukebox-oriented pieces recorded by Quebec for the label, which, coincidentally, was the last Blue Note session recorded at Rudy Van Gelder's original facility in Hackensack, New Jersey. The final two tracks were recorded at Van Gelder's new studio in nearby Englewood Cliffs.

The first eight tracks are also included in the later The Complete Blue Note 45 Sessions.

== Track listing ==
All compositions by Ike Quebec, except where noted.

1. "A Light Reprieve" – 4:39
2. "The Buzzard Lope" – 6:17
3. "Blue Monday" (Fisher, Sharp, Singleton) – 5:05
4. "Zonky" (Edwin Swanston) – 4:34
5. "Later for the Rock" – 4:37
6. "Sweet and Lovely" (Arnheim, LeMare, Tobias) – 4:19
7. "Dear John" – 6:53
8. "Blue Friday" (Swanston) – 5:05
9. "Cry Me a River" (Hamilton) – 6:40 previously unissued
10. "Uptight" – 5:04 previously unissued

== Personnel ==
- Ike Quebec – tenor saxophone
- Edwin Swanston – organ
- Clifton "Skeeter" Best – guitar
- Charles "Sonny" Wellesley – bass
- Les Jenkins – drums
