= The Modern Jazz Sextet =

1956 studio album by multiple artists

Studio album by Dizzy Gillespie, Sonny Stitt, John Lewis, Percy Heath, Skeeter Best, Charlie Persip
- Released: 1956
- Recorded: January 12, 1956 at Fine Sound Studios, NYC
- Genre: Jazz
- Length: 42:26
- Label: Norgran Records MGN 1076
- Producer: Norman Granz

Dizzy Gillespie chronology
One Night in Washington (1955)	The Modern Jazz Sextet (1956)	World Statesman (1956)

The Modern Jazz Sextet is a jazz album featuring the combined talents of Dizzy Gillespie, Sonny Stitt, John Lewis, Percy Heath, Skeeter Best and Charlie Persip. The album was conceived by producer Norman Granz for his own label, Norgran Records. Although no single album artist is credited as a bandleader for this album, Verve Records - which owns the Norgran catalogue - files it as a Dizzy Gillespie album.

Two of the album's rhythm section, Lewis and Heath, also feature in the 1952-founded Modern Jazz Quartet.

== Reception ==
Professional ratings
Review scores
Source	Rating
AllMusic	4/5 stars

AllMusic gives the album four stars, stating that "it did not take too much insight to realize that putting trumpeter Dizzy Gillespie and altoist Sonny Stitt together with a strong rhythm section would result in some explosive music. ...Bebop at its best."

== Track listing ==
1. "Tour De Force" (Dizzy Gillespie) - 11:39
2. "Dizzy Meets Sonny" (Gillespie) - 7:59
3. "Ballad Medley: Old Folks/What's New?/How Deep is the Ocean?" (Dedette Lee Hill, Willard Robison/Bob Haggart, Johnny Burke/Irving Berlin) - 7:10
4. "Mean to Me" (Roy Turk, Fred E. Ahlert) - 6:30
5. "Blues for Bird" (Sonny Stitt, Gillespie) - 9:08

== Credits ==
- Dizzy Gillespie - trumpet
- Sonny Stitt - alto saxophone
- John Lewis - piano
- Percy Heath - double bass
- Skeeter Best - guitar
- Charlie Persip - drums
- Norman Granz - producer
