= Blue & Sentimental =

Studio album by Ike Quebec
- Released: 1962
- Recorded: December 16 and 23, 1961
- Studio: Van Gelder Studio; Englewood Cliffs, New Jersey
- Genre: Jazz
- Length: 39:31 (LP); 50:27 (CD)
- Label: Blue Note; BLP 4098
- Producer: Alfred Lion

Ike Quebec chronology
It Might as Well Be Spring (1961)	Blue & Sentimental (1962)	Easy Living (1962)

Blue & Sentimental is an album by American jazz saxophonist Ike Quebec recorded for Blue Note on December 16 & 23, 1961 and released the following year.

== Background ==
The album features a quartet made up of Quebec (occasionally doubling on piano), guitarist Grant Green, and rhythm section Paul Chambers and Philly Joe Jones. The album features rare rhythm guitar accompaniment by Green, who was more typically a soloist. The original LP release featured six tracks, and two additional titles ("That Old Black Magic" and "It's All Right With Me") were added to CD reissues starting in 1988. The track "Count Every Star" features a different group of backing musicians.

== Reception ==
Professional ratings
Review scores
Source	Rating
AllMusic	5/5 stars
The Penguin Guide to Jazz Recordings	3/4 stars
All About Jazz	3.5/5 stars

The AllMusic review by Steve Huey calls Blue & Sentimental "a superbly sensuous blend of lusty blues swagger and achingly romantic ballads" and "a quiet, sorely underrated masterpiece".

In 2004, critic Richard Cook wrote that the album "might be Quebec's masterpiece".

== Track listing ==
=== Side 1 ===
1. "Blue and Sentimental" (Count Basie, Mack David, Jerry Livingston) – 7:28
2. "Minor Impulse" (Quebec) – 6:34
3. "Don't Take Your Love from Me" (Henry Nemo) – 7:04

=== Side 2 ===
1. "Blues for Charlie" (Grant Green) – 6:48
2. "Like" (Quebec) – 5:21
3. "Count Every Star" (Bruno Coquatrix, Sammy Gallop) – 6:16

=== 1988 CD track listing ===
1. "Blue and Sentimental" (Count Basie, Mack David, Jerry Livingston) – 7:28
2. "Minor Impulse" (Quebec) – 6:34
3. "Don't Take Your Love from Me" (Henry Nemo) – 7:04
4. "Blues for Charlie" (Grant Green) – 6:48
5. "Like" (Quebec) – 5:21
6. "That Old Black Magic" (Harold Arlen, Johnny Mercer) – 4:52 Bonus track on CD reissue
7. "It's All Right with Me" (Cole Porter) – 6:05 Bonus track on CD reissue
8. "Count Every Star" (Bruno Coquatrix, Sammy Gallop) – 6:16

Recorded on December 16 (tracks 1–7) and December 23 (track 8), 1961.

== Personnel ==
=== Musicians ===
==== December 16, 1961 ====
- Ike Quebec – tenor saxophone, piano
- Grant Green – guitar
- Paul Chambers – bass
- Philly Joe Jones – drums

==== December 23, 1961 ("Count Every Star") ====
- Ike Quebec – tenor saxophone
- Grant Green – guitar
- Sonny Clark – piano
- Sam Jones – bass
- Louis Hayes – drums

=== Technical personnel ===
- Alfred Lion – producer
- Rudy Van Gelder – recording engineer
- Reid Miles – design
- Francis Wolff – photography
- Ira Gitler – liner notes
