= Heavy Soul (Ike Quebec album) =

Studio album by Ike Quebec
- Released: Mid March 1962
- Recorded: November 26, 1961; Van Gelder Studio, Englewood Cliffs
- Genre: Soul jazz
- Length: 48:47
- Label: Blue Note; BST 84093
- Producer: Alfred Lion

Ike Quebec chronology
From Hackensack to Englewood Cliffs (1959)	Heavy Soul (1962)	It Might as Well Be Spring (1961)

Heavy Soul is the debut album by American saxophonist Ike Quebec, recorded in 1961 and released on the Blue Note label.

== Reception ==
Professional ratings
Review scores
Source	Rating
Allmusic	4/5 stars
The Penguin Guide to Jazz Recordings	2.5/4 stars
Tom Hull	B+

The Allmusic review by Scott Yanow awarded the album 4 stars and stated "Thick-toned tenor Ike Quebec is in excellent form... His ballad statements are quite warm, and he swings nicely on a variety of medium-tempo material".

== Track listing ==
All compositions by Ike Quebec except as indicated

1. "Acquitted" - 5:38
2. "Just One More Chance" (Sam Coslow, Arthur Johnston) - 5:50
3. "Que's Dilemma" - 4:29
4. "Brother, Can You Spare a Dime?" (Jay Gorney, Yip Harburg) - 5:28
5. "The Man I Love" (Gershwin, Gershwin) - 6:31
6. "Heavy Soul" - 6:51
7. "I Want a Little Girl" (Murray Mencher, Billy Moll) - 5:22
8. "Nature Boy" (eden ahbez) - 2:44
9. "Blues for Ike" (Roach) - 5:54 Bonus track on CD

== Personnel ==
- Ike Quebec - tenor saxophone
- Freddie Roach - organ (tracks 1–7 & 9)
- Milt Hinton - bass
- Al Harewood - drums (tracks 1–7 & 9)
