= It Might as Well Be Spring (Ike Quebec album) =

Studio album by Ike Quebec
- Released: Mid July 1964
- Recorded: December 9, 1961
- Studio: Van Gelder Studio, Englewood Cliffs, NJ
- Genre: Jazz
- Length: 35:49
- Label: Blue Note; BST 84105
- Producer: Alfred Lion

Ike Quebec chronology
Heavy Soul (1961)	It Might as Well Be Spring (1964)	Blue & Sentimental (1961)

Professional ratings
Review scores
Source	Rating
Allmusic	3.5/5 stars
The Penguin Guide to Jazz Recordings	3.5/4 stars
DownBeat	4/5 stars

It Might as Well Be Spring is an album by American saxophonist Ike Quebec recorded in 1961 and released on the Blue Note label.

== Reception ==
The Allmusic review by Stephen Thomas Erlewine awarded the album 3½ stars and stated "Ike Quebec recorded another winning hard bop album with It Might As Well Be Spring. In many ways, the record is a companion piece to Heavy Soul. Since the two albums were recorded so close together, it's not surprising that there a number of stylistic similarities, but there are subtle differences to savor. The main distinction between the two dates is that It Might As Well Be Spring is a relaxed, romantic date composed of standards. It provides Quebec with ample opportunity to showcase his rich, lyrical ballad style, and he shines throughout the album".

== Track listing ==
All compositions by Ike Quebec except where noted

1. "It Might as Well Be Spring" (Oscar Hammerstein II, Richard Rodgers) - 6:22
2. "A Light Reprieve" - 5:25
3. "Easy - Don't Hurt" - 6:08
4. "Lover Man" (Jimmy Davis, Ram Ramirez, James Sherman) - 5:57
5. "Ol' Man River" (Hammerstein II, Jerome Kern) - 6:37
6. "Willow Weep for Me" (Ann Ronell) - 5:20

== Personnel ==
- Ike Quebec - tenor saxophone
- Freddie Roach - organ
- Milt Hinton - bass
- Al Harewood - drums
