= Bossa Nova Soul Samba =

Soul Samba

Studio album by Ike Quebec
- Released: 1962
- Recorded: October 5, 1962
- Studios: Van Gelder Studio, Englewood Cliffs, NJ
- Genres: Bossa nova, soul jazz, latin jazz
- Length: 37:47
- Labels: Blue Note; BST 84114
- Producer: Alfred Lion

Ike Quebec chronology
Easy Living (1962)	Soul Samba (1962)

Bossa Nova Soul Samba is an album by American saxophonist Ike Quebec recorded in 1962 and released on the Blue Note label. It was Quebec's final recording before his death in January 1963.

== Reception ==
Professional ratings
Review scores
Source	Rating
Allmusic	4/5 stars
The Penguin Guide to Jazz Recordings	3/4 stars

The Allmusic review by Scott Yanow states, "Quebec emphasizes warm, long tones (reminiscent of Coleman Hawkins in a romantic fashion), and his sidemen play light and appealing but nonetheless authoritative bossa rhythms."

== Track listing ==
All compositions by Ike Quebec except where noted

1. "Loie" (Kenny Burrell) – 3:10
2. "Lloro Tu Despedida" (Aldo Cabral, Joraci Camargo, Emanuel Lacordaire) – 3:01
3. "Goin' Home" (Antonín Dvořák, William Arms Fisher) – 5:39
4. "Me 'n You" – 5:58
5. "Liebesträume" (Franz Liszt) – 3:42
6. "Shu Shu" (Antônio Almeida, Carlos Monteiro DeSouza) – 3:31
7. "Blue Samba" – 5:18
8. "Favela" (Joraci Camargo, Heckel Tavares) – 4:00
9. "Linda Flor" (Henrique Vogeler) – 3:28

Bonus tracks on CD reissue:

10. "Loie" [alternate take] (Burrell) – 3:32
11. "Shu Shu" [alternate take] (Almeida, DeSouza) – 3:19
12. "Favela" [alternate take] (Camargo, Tavares) – 3:21

== Personnel ==
- Ike Quebec – tenor saxophone
- Kenny Burrell – guitar
- Wendell Marshall – bass
- Willie Bobo – drums
- Garvin Masseaux – chekere

== Charts ==
=== Weekly charts ===
Weekly chart performance for Bossa Nova Soul Samba
Chart (2026)	Peak position
Greek Albums (IFPI) Rudy Van Gelder edition	54
UK Jazz & Blues Albums (Official Charts)	18

=== Monthly charts ===
Monthly chart performance for Bossa Nova Soul Samba
Chart (2026)	Peak position
German Jazz Albums (Offizielle Top 100)	7
