= Easy Living (Ike Quebec album) =

Album by Ike Quebec

Studio album by Ike Quebec
- Released: 1987
- Recorded: January 20, 1962
- Studio: Van Gelder Studio, Englewood Cliffs, NJ
- Genre: Jazz
- Length: 56:52
- Label: Blue Note; BST 84103
- Producer: Alfred Lion

Ike Quebec chronology
Blue & Sentimental (1961)	Easy Living (1987)	Soul Samba (1962)

Alternative cover
- Congo Lament (LT 1089)

Easy Living is an album by American saxophonist Ike Quebec recorded in 1962, but not released on the Blue Note label until 1987. The album collects all the material recorded in January 1962, five tracks from which were released in 1981 as Congo Lament.

== Reception ==
Professional ratings
Review scores
Source	Rating
Allmusic	4.5/5 stars

The Allmusic review by Steve Huey awarded the album 4½ stars and stated: "The mood isn't as unified as some of his carefully calibrated romantic dates, but Easy Living offers the two strongest sides of Quebec's musical personality in one place, encapsulating a great deal of what he did best". The Easy Living LP did not contain all the sextet tracks (#1–5) from the Congo Lament session, which can also be found in Bennie Green's Mosaic box set.

== Track listing ==
1. "See See Rider" (Ma Rainey) - 9:01
2. "Congo Lament" (Bennie Green) - 6:53
3. "Que's Pills" (Turrentine) - 5:40
4. "B.G.'s Groove Two" (Green) - 6:15 Bonus track on CD reissue
5. "I.Q. Shuffle" (Quebec) - 9:47 Bonus track on CD reissue
6. "I've Got a Crush on You" (Gershwin, Gershwin) - 6:51
7. "Nancy (With the Laughing Face)" (Jimmy Van Heusen, Phil Silvers) - 7:25
8. "Easy Living" (Ralph Rainger, Leo Robin) - 5:00

== Personnel ==
- Ike Quebec - tenor saxophone
- Bennie Green - trombone (tracks 1–5)
- Stanley Turrentine - tenor saxophone (tracks 1–5)
- Sonny Clark - piano
- Milt Hinton - bass
- Art Blakey - drums
