= Percussion and Bass =

Studio album by Jo Jones and Milt Hinton
- Released: 1960
- Recorded: May 11, 1960
- Studio: New York City, NY
- Genre: Jazz
- Length: 32:35
- Label: Everest; LPBR 5110/SDBR 1110

Jo Jones chronology
Vamp 'til Ready (1960)	Percussion and Bass (1960)	Midnight Slows Vol. 4 (1974)

Milt Hinton chronology
The Rhythm Section (1956)	Percussion and Bass (1960)	Here Swings the Judge (1957)

Percussion and Bass is an album recorded by drummer Jo Jones and bassist Milt Hinton in 1960 and released by the Everest label.

== Reception ==
Professional ratings
Review scores
Source	Rating
AllMusic	2/5 stars

AllMusic reviewer Ken Dryden stated "this historical curiosity, originally recorded for Everest, featu[r]es just the two of them exploring the rhythmic possibilities within a dozen numbers. Jones' brushwork is matchless as usual, while Hinton's considerable technique is also apparent. ... While the playing time is brief at just 34 minutes, it's great to hear two masters at work".

== Track listing ==
All compositions by Jo Jones except where noted

1. "Tam" – 2:00
2. "Me and You" (Milt Hinton) – 2:25
3. "Coffee Dan" (Hinton) – 2:54
4. "The Love Nest" (Louis Hirsch, Otto Harbach) – 4:34
5. "H.O.T. (Helen of Troy)" – 2:30
6. "Shoes on the Ruffs" – 3:40
7. "The Walls Fall" (Jones, Hinton) – 2:35
8. "Blue Skies" (Irving Berlin) – 2:35
9. "Late in the Evenin'" (Hinton, Everett Barksdale) – 2:21
10. "Ocho Puertas" – 2:55
11. "Tin Top Alley Blues" (Jones, Hinton) – 3:01
12. "Little Honey" – 2:34

== Personnel ==
- Jo Jones – drums, percussion
- Milt Hinton – bass
