= Dodo Greene =

American jazz singer (1924–2006)

- Born: Dorthea Hawkins; January 18, 1924; Buffalo, New York, United States
- Died: July 21, 2006 (aged 82) Buffalo, New York, United States
- Genres: Jazz, blues, R&B
- Occupation: Musician
- Instrument: vocals
- Labels: Time, Blue Note

Dodo Greene (born Dorthea Hawkins; January 18, 1924 - July 21, 2006) was an American jazz vocalist who performed in clubs and venues in Buffalo, and along the East Coast and Chicago, before releasing two albums in the 1960s, and touring internationally.

== Life and work ==
Dodo Greene was born in Buffalo, New York in 1924 and began singing at an early age before being given the opportunity to fill-in as a vocalist for Cozy Cole's band which led her to pursue a career in music.

In 1959 she moved to New York City to perform with Cab Calloway's revue at the Winter Garden Theatre and recorded her first album for Time Records, Ain't What You Do. She signed to Blue Note in 1962, becoming the first female vocalist released on that label, but after only one album, My Hour of Need, did not release another record.

Greene returned to Buffalo, and in 1997, she was inducted into the Buffalo Music Hall of Fame, and continued performing into the early 2000s.
