= Ike Quebec =

American jazz saxophonist (1918–1963)

- Quebec, c. 1961

Background information
- Born: Ike Abrams Quebec; August 17, 1918; Newark, New Jersey, U.S.
- Died: January 16, 1963 (aged 44) New York City, U.S.
- Genres: Swing; hard bop; soul jazz
- Occupation: Musician
- Instruments: Tenor saxophone; piano
- Years active: 1940–1962
- Label: Blue Note
- Resting place: Woodland Cemetery, Newark, New Jersey

Ike Abrams Quebec (August 17, 1918 – January 16, 1963) was an American jazz tenor saxophonist. He began his career in the big band era of the 1940s, then fell from prominence for a time until launching a comeback in the years before his death.

Critic Alex Henderson wrote, "Though he was never an innovator, Quebec had a big, breathy sound that was distinctive and easily recognizable, and he was quite consistent when it came to down-home blues, sexy ballads, and up-tempo aggression."

== Biography ==
Quebec was born in Newark, New Jersey, United States. An accomplished dancer and pianist, he switched to tenor saxophone as his primary instrument in his early twenties and quickly earned a reputation as a promising player. His performance career started in 1940, with the Barons of Rhythm. Not to be confused with the Count Basie Orchestra band of the same name, the Barons disbanded in 1941 when the U.S. entered World War II, and they were never recorded.

Quebec later recorded or performed with Frankie Newton, Hot Lips Page, Roy Eldridge, Trummy Young, Ella Fitzgerald, Benny Carter, and Coleman Hawkins. Between 1944 and 1951, he worked intermittently with Cab Calloway. He began to record for the Blue Note label in the mid-1940s, becoming the label's biggest jukebox star during this time, picking up national hits with "Blue Harlem" and "If I Had You". During this time, Quebec also served as a talent scout for Blue Note, helping to bring Dexter Gordon, Thelonious Monk, and Bud Powell to wider attention.

Due in part to struggles with heroin addiction, for which he served two short sentences at Rikers Island Prison, Quebec recorded only sporadically during the 1950s. However, he still performed regularly and remained abreast of new developments in jazz, with his later playing incorporating elements of hard bop, bossa nova, and soul jazz.

In 1959, Quebec mounted a comeback with a series of albums on the Blue Note label. Blue Note executive Alfred Lion was always fond of Quebec's music, but was unsure how audiences would respond to the saxophonist after a decade of low visibility. In the mid-to-late 1950s, Blue Note therefore issued a series of Quebec singles for the jukebox market; audiences responded well, leading to a number of warmly-received albums. Quebec occasionally recorded on piano, as on his 1961 album Blue & Sentimental, where he alternated between tenor and piano, playing the latter behind Grant Green's guitar solos.

Quebec's comeback was short-lived. He died in January 1963, at the age of 44, from lung cancer. Quebec's legacy was later commemorated by Blue Note, which gifted a commemorative tombstone to Woodland Cemetery, in Newark, New Jersey, for Quebec's grave, in 1992.

== Family ==
Quebec's cousin Danny Quebec West was an alto saxophonist who, at the age of 17, recorded with Thelonious Monk on his first session for Blue Note in 1947.

== Discography ==
=== As leader ===
- Ike Quebec Tenor Sax (Blue Note, 1945)
- From Hackensack to Englewood Cliffs (Blue Note, 1959 [rel. 2000])
- The Complete Blue Note 45 Sessions (Blue Note, 1959–1962 [rel. 2005]) 2-CD set; originally released on Mosaic Records in 1988; also contains 8 of the 10 tracks on From Hackensack to Englewood Cliffs
- Heavy Soul (Blue Note 84093, 1961 [rel. 1962])
- It Might as Well Be Spring (Blue Note 84105, 1961 [rel. 1964])
- Blue & Sentimental (Blue Note 84098, 1961 [rel. 1963])
- Easy Living (Blue Note 84103 (LP), 1962; 46846 [CD], 1987) the CD issue contains all 5 "sextet" tracks that were first released on Congo Lament
- Bossa Nova Soul Samba (Blue Note 84114, 1962 [rel. 1963])
- With a Song in My Heart (Blue Note LT-1052 [LP], 1962 [rel. 1980]) collects 9 tracks that later appeared on The Complete Blue Note 45 Sessions
- Congo Lament (Blue Note LT-1089 [LP], 1962 [rel. 1981]) sextet recordings with Bennie Green and Stanley Turrentine
- The Art of Ike Quebec (Blue Note 99178 [CD], 1992) compilation
- Ballads (Blue Note 56690 [CD], 1997) compilation of 9 tracks from Easy Living, Born to Be Blue (Grant Green album), Heavy Soul, It Might as Well Be Spring, The Complete Blue Note 45 Sessions, and With a Song in My Heart

=== As sideman ===
with Cab Calloway and His Orchestra

- Live At The New Cafe Zanzibar 1944 (Magnetic Records)

with Sonny Clark

- Leapin' and Lopin' (Blue Note, 1961) – on one track only

with Grant Green

- Born to Be Blue (Blue Note, 1962 [rel. 1985])
- The Latin Bit (Blue Note, 1962) – on two CD bonus tracks

with Dodo Greene

- My Hour of Need (Blue Note, 1962 [rel. 1963])

With Jimmy Smith

- Open House (Blue Note, 1960)
- Plain Talk (Blue Note, 1960)
