= Milt Hinton =

American double bassist and photographer (1910–2000)

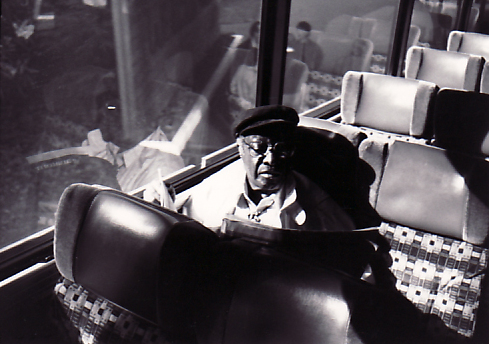
- Milt Hinton aboard the SS Norway (1988)

Background information
- Born: Milton John Hinton; June 23, 1910; Vicksburg, Mississippi, U.S.
- Died: December 19, 2000 (aged 90) Queens, New York
- Genres: Traditional jazz, swing, bop
- Occupations: Musician, photographer, educator
- Instrument: Double bass
- Years active: 1920s–1990s
- Labels: CBS, Bethlehem, Victor, Black & Blue, Chiaroscuro
- Website: www.milthinton.com

Milton John Hinton (June 23, 1910 – December 19, 2000) was an American double bassist and photographer.

Regarded as the Dean of American jazz bass players, his nicknames included "Sporty" from his years in Chicago, "Fump" from his time on the road with Cab Calloway, and "The Judge" from the 1950s and beyond. Hinton's recording career lasted over 60 years, mostly in jazz but also with a variety of other genres as a prolific session musician.

He was also a photographer of note, praised for documenting American jazz during the 20th Century.

== Biography ==
=== Early life in Mississippi (1910–1919) ===
Hinton was born in Vicksburg, Mississippi, United States, the only child of Hilda Gertrude Robinson, whom he referred to as "Titter," and Milton Dixon Hinton. He was three-months-old when his father left the family. He grew up in a home with his mother, his maternal grandmother (a former slave of Joe Davis, the brother of Jefferson Davis), and two of his mother's sisters.

His childhood in Vicksburg was characterized by extreme poverty and extreme racism. Lynching was a common practice at the time. Hinton said that one of the clearest memories of his childhood was when he accidentally came upon a lynching.

=== Growing up in Chicago (1919–1935) ===
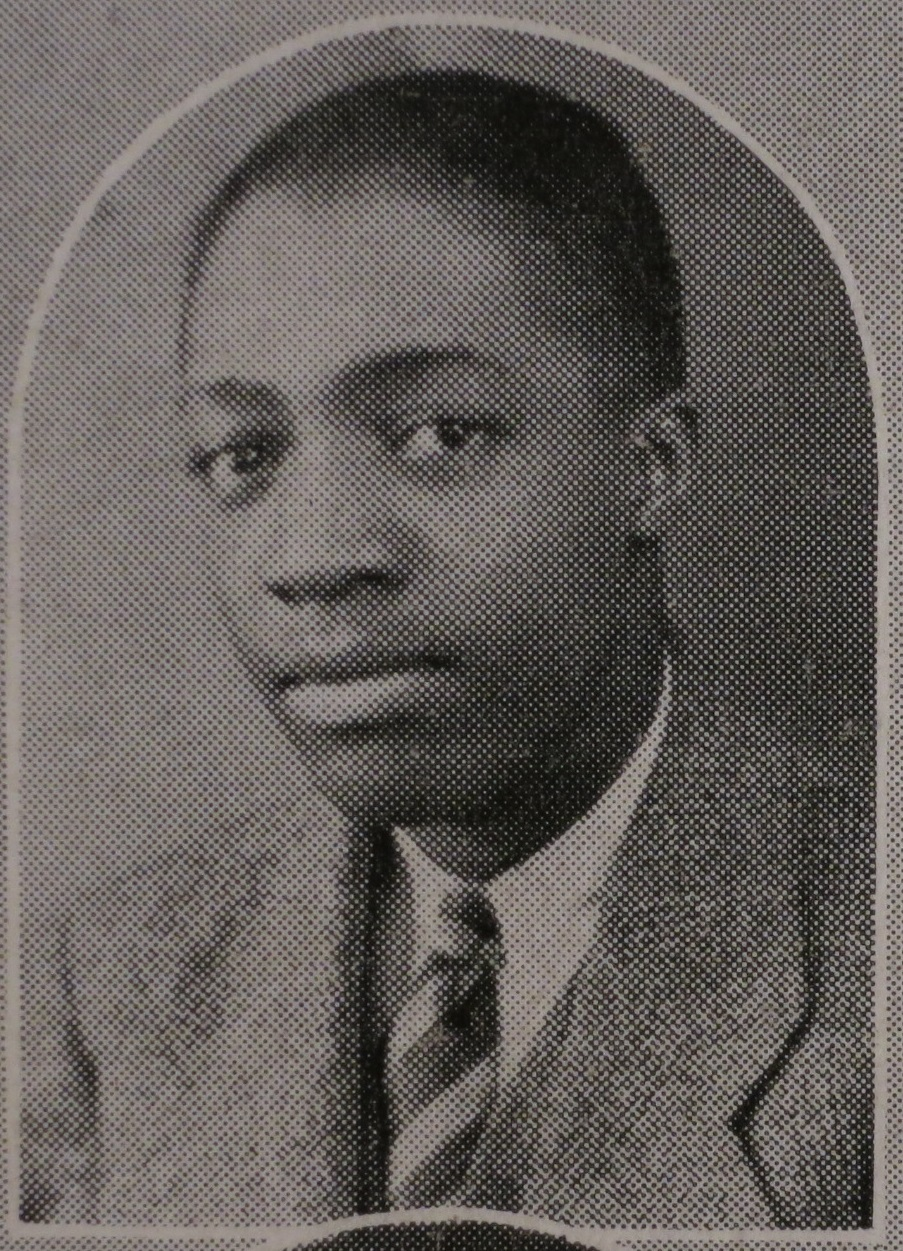
Milt Hinton from his high school yearbook (1930)

Hinton moved with his extended family to Chicago, Illinois, in late 1919, which created opportunities for him. Chicago was where Hinton first encountered economic diversity among African-Americans, about which he later noted, "That's when I realized that being black didn't always mean you had to be poor." It was also where he experienced an abundance of music, either in person or through live performances on the radio. During this time he first heard concerts featuring Louis Armstrong, Duke Ellington, Fletcher Henderson, Earl Hines, Eddie South, and many others.

Music was a fixture at home. His mother and other relatives regularly played piano. He received his first instrument – a violin – in 1923 for his thirteenth birthday, which he studied for four years. In addition to taking violin lessons, Hinton and his mother attended performances at the Vendome Theater every Sunday, featuring the orchestra of Erskine Tate with Louis Armstrong as a feature soloist.

After graduating from Wendell Phillips High School, Hinton attended Crane Junior College for two years, during which time he began receiving regular work as a freelance musician around Chicago. He performed with Freddie Keppard, Zutty Singleton, Jabbo Smith, Erskine Tate, and Art Tatum. Hinton soon taught himself to play the double bass because opportunities for violinists were limited. His first steady job began in the spring of 1930, playing tuba (and later double bass) in the band of pianist Tiny Parham. His recording debut on November 4, 1930, was on tuba with Parham's band on a tune titled "Squeeze Me." After graduating from Crane Junior College in 1932, attended Northwestern University for one semester, then dropped out to pursue music full-time. He received steady work from 1932 through 1935 in a quartet with violinist Eddie South, with extended residencies in California, Chicago, and Detroit. With this group he first recorded on double bass in early 1933.

=== The Cab Calloway era (1936–1950) ===
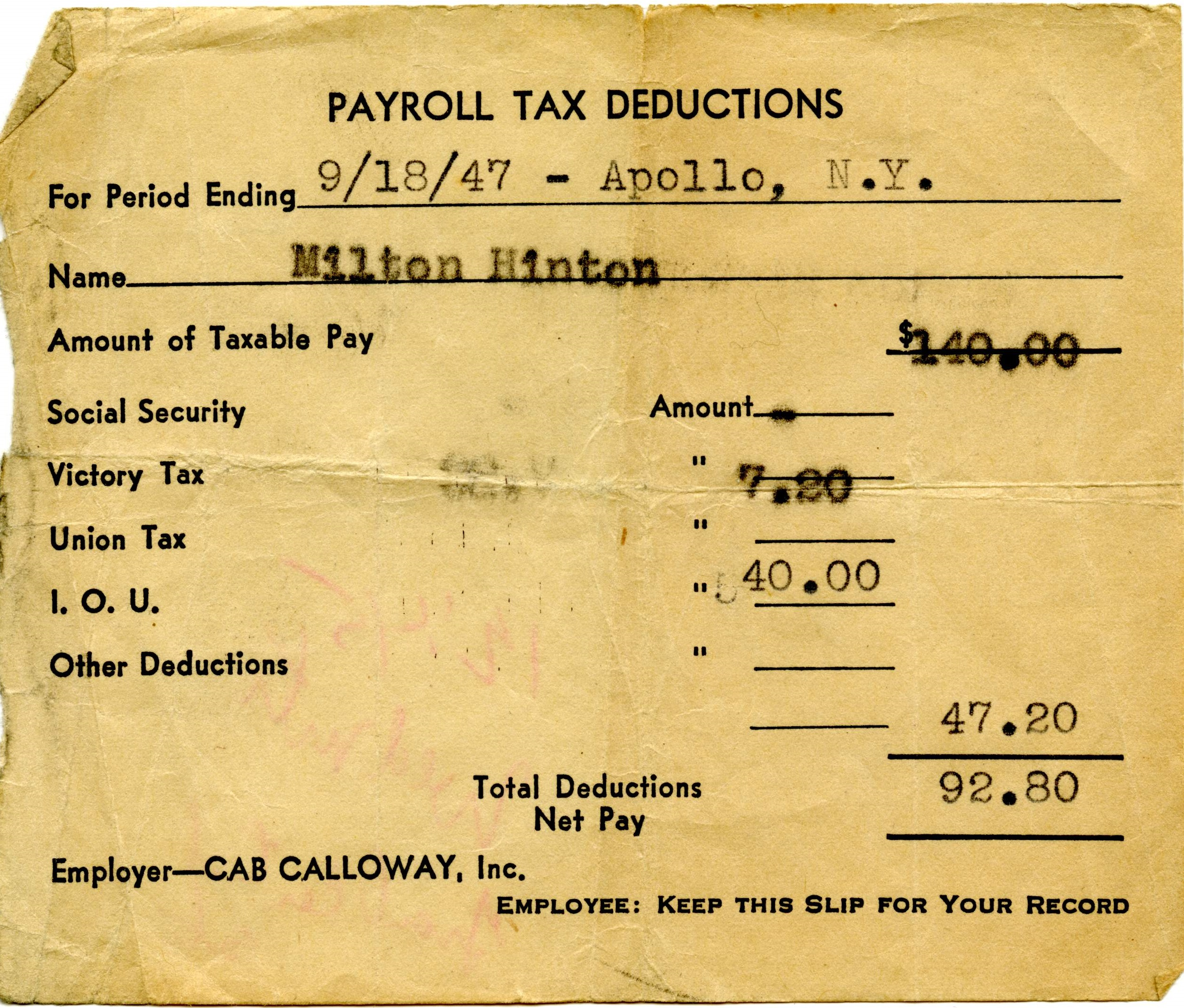
Paystub from Cab Calloway to Milt Hinton (1947)

In 1936, Hinton joined the Cab Calloway Orchestra, initially as a temporary replacement for Al Morgan, while the band was on tour en route to a six-month residency at the newly opened midtown location of the Cotton Club in New York City. He quickly found acceptance among the band members, and he ended up staying with Calloway for over fifteen years. Until the Cotton Club closed in 1940, the Calloway band performed there for up to six months per year, going on tour for the remaining six months of the year. During the Cotton Club residencies, Hinton took part in recording sessions with Benny Goodman, Lionel Hampton, Billie Holiday, Ethel Waters, Teddy Wilson, and many others. It was at this time that he recorded what is possibly the first bass feature, "Pluckin' the Bass" in August 1939.

Hinton appeared regularly on radio while in Calloway's band, either on bass in concerts broadcast from the Cotton Club, or as a cast member for the short-lived music quiz show "Cab Calloway's Quizzicale." These broadcasts brought national attention to the Calloway band and helped enable the successful national tours the band would schedule. They also gave listeners a chance to hear examples of jive talk, which Calloway would formalize through publications such as his Hepster's Dictionary, first published in 1938.

Calloway's band included renowned sidemen such as Danny Barker, Chu Berry, Doc Cheatham, Cozy Cole, Dizzy Gillespie, Illinois Jacquet, Jonah Jones, Ike Quebec, and Ben Webster. Hinton credits Chu Berry with elevating the overall musicianship of the Calloway band, in part by encouraging Cab to hire arrangers such as Benny Carter, to create new arrangements that would challenge the musicians. As Hinton put it, "Musically he was the greatest thing that ever happened to the band." Hinton was also heavily influenced by the musical innovations of Dizzy Gillespie, with whom he had informal sessions in the late 1930s, during breaks between sets at the Cotton Club. Hinton credits Gillespie with introducing him to many of the experimental harmonic practices and chord substitutions, that would later be associated with bebop.

In 1939 when Hinton returned to Chicago for his grandmother's funeral, he met Mona Clayton, who was then singing in his mother's church choir. The two were married a few years later and remained inseparable for the rest of Milt's life. (Mona was his second wife; the first was a brief relationship in the 1930s with Oby Allen, a friend he knew from high school.) He and Mona's only child, Charlotte, was born on February 28, 1947. Mona had begun traveling with the Calloway Orchestra in the early 1940s — the only musician's friend or spouse to do so. She helped musicians in the band manage their money, and she often insisted that they open savings accounts. For band members, she was a trusted confidant who was known for her discretion. When traveling with a toddler became too difficult, the Hintons bought a two-family house in Queens, and ten years later they purchased a larger single-family home in an adjacent neighborhood where they remained for the rest of their lives.

In addition to caring for their daughter, Mona handled the family's finances, and her attention to detail ensured the couple's financial security later in life. She kept track of Hinton's freelance work, scheduled interviews, coordinated public relations events, and often drove him back and forth to gigs (Hinton never drove as an adult, due in part to a car accident he was involved in as a teenager in Chicago). In the mid-1960s, Mona completed both a bachelor's and a master's degree and taught in the public schools for several years. In the 1970s, she began traveling with Hinton again and was regularly invited to join him at jazz parties and festivals where he performed. At the same time, she was active as a music contractor for Lena Horne and others. Mona was always well respected in the jazz community, and she and Hinton were viewed by many as role models; as the jazz historian Dan Morgenstern noted in an article from 2000, "If there is a closer couple, I'd be surprised."

=== After Cab Calloway (1950–1954) ===
By 1950, popular music tastes had changed, and Calloway lacked the funds to support a full big band. Instead, he hired Hinton and a few others to create a smaller ensemble, first a septet and later a quartet, which toured until June 1952, with trips to Cuba and Uruguay. After the Calloway ensemble disbanded, Hinton spent more time as a freelance studio musician in New York City. At first, the work was sporadic, and, as Hinton put it, "This was the one period in my life when I was worried about earning a living." He played as many clubs and restaurants as possible, a practice he would continue for the next several decades. He performed regularly at La Vie en Rose, the Embers, the Metropole, and Basin Street West, where he appeared with Jackie Gleason, Phil Moore, and Joe Bushkin. In the early 1950s, he performed with Count Basie for a brief time in the New York area.

Although his freelance work was increasing, in July 1953 Hinton signed a one-year contract to tour with Louis Armstrong. He described the decision as "very difficult" as it would force him to be away from his family, and it would also slow down the momentum he was gaining as a freelance musician in New York City. Steady pay and the opportunity to perform with Armstrong were persuasive, and Hinton performed dozens of concerts, including a tour of Japan, as a member of the band. When an opportunity to join the house band for a television show hosted by Robert Q. Lewis in New York opened up in February 1954, Hinton gave his notice to Armstrong and returned to Queens.

=== In the studios (1954–1970) ===
For roughly the next two decades he performed regularly on numerous radio and television programs, including those hosted by Jackie Gleason, Robert Q. Lewis, Galen Drake, Patti Page, Polly Bergen, Teddy Wilson, Mitch Miller, Dick Cavett, and others. As he recalled, "I had a great situation because I was never on staff. That meant I'd get paid by the show. And since I never spent more than fifteen hours a week on rehearsals and shows, I always had free time to do record dates."

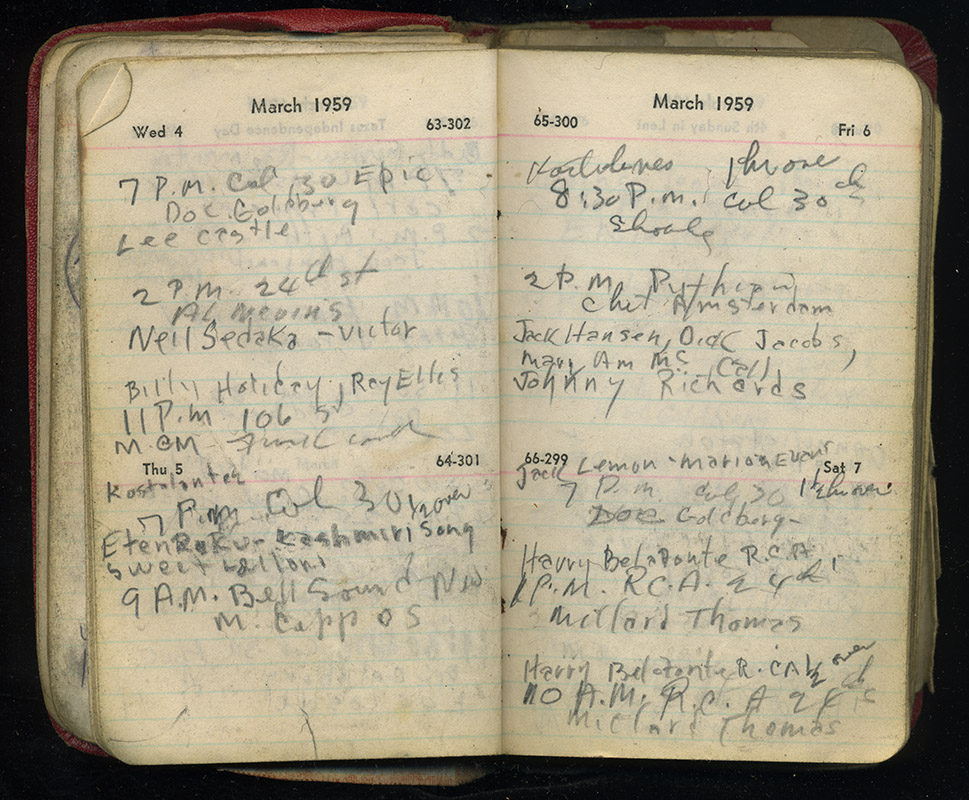
Milt Hinton's datebook (1959)

By far, his most regular work during this era was in the recording studio, where Hinton was among the first African-Americans to be regularly hired for studio contract work. From the mid-1950s through the early 1970s, he contributed to thousands of jazz and popular records, as well as hundreds of jingles and film soundtracks. He would regularly play on three three-hour studio sessions per day, requiring him to own multiple basses that he hired assistants to transport from one studio to the next. During this era, he recorded with everyone from Billie Holiday to Paul McCartney, Frank Sinatra to Leon Redbone, and Sam Cooke to Barbra Streisand. As Hinton summarized his time in the studios, "I might be on a date for Andre Kostelanetz in the morning, do one with Brook Benton or Johnny Mathis in the afternoon, and then finish up the day with Paul Anka or Bobby Rydell. At one time or another, I probably played for just about every popular artist around in those days."

Starting in the mid-1950s, he regularly worked in the studio with Hank Jones (piano), Barry Galbraith (guitar), and Osie Johnson (drums) in a group that informally became known as the New York Rhythm Section. The four played on hundreds of sessions together and even recorded an LP in 1956 that was titled, The Rhythm Section.

=== After the studios (1970–2000) ===
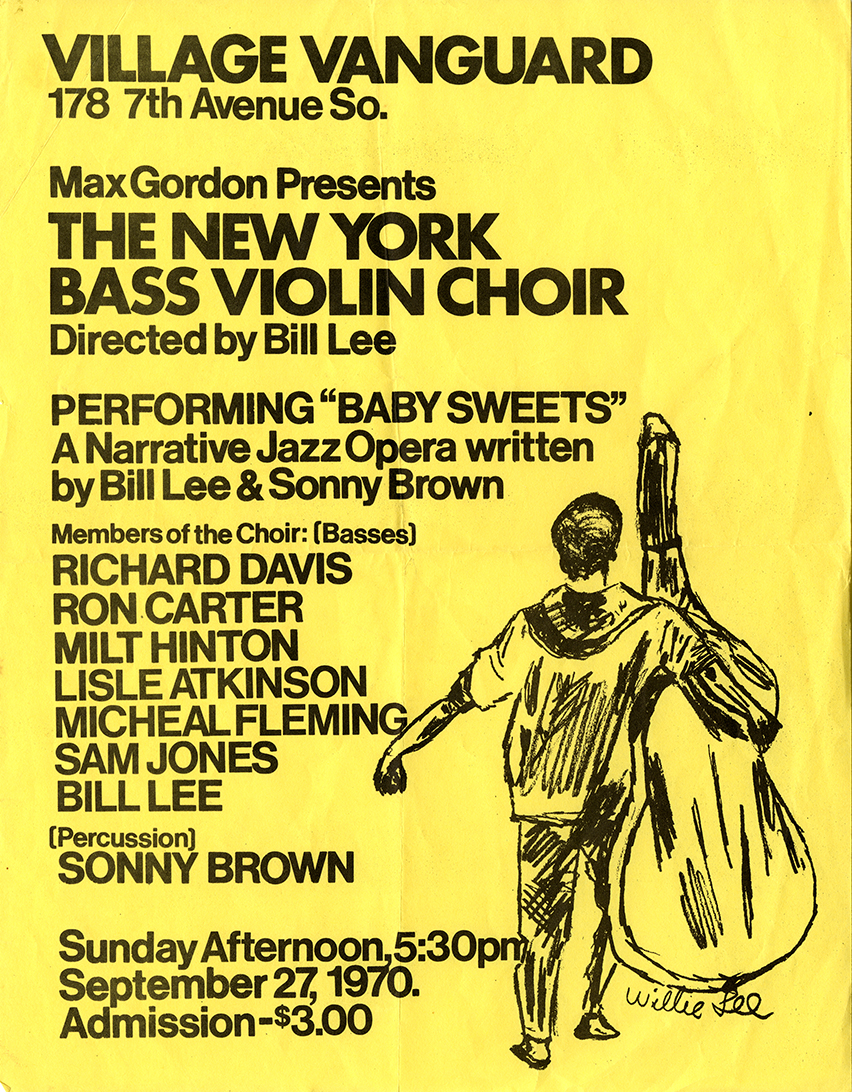
Ad for 1970 performance of the New York Bass Violin Choir

By the late 1960s, studio work began dropping off, so Hinton incorporated more live performances into his schedule. He regularly accepted club gigs, most often at Michael's Pub, Zinno's, and the Rainbow Room where he performed with Benny Goodman, Johnny Hartman, Dick Hyman, Red Norvo, Teddy Wilson, and others. He also went back on the road, first with Diahann Carroll for a tour in Paris in 1966, and later with Paul Anka, Barbra Streisand, Pearl Bailey, and Bing Crosby. From the 1960s through the 1990s he traveled extensively to Europe, Canada, South America, Japan, the Soviet Union, and the Middle East, while also appearing throughout the U.S.

In 1968, he began performing as a part of Professionals Unlimited (later renamed the New York Bass Violin Choir), a collective bass ensemble organized by Bill Lee that included Lisle Atkinson, Ron Carter, Richard Davis, Michael Fleming, Percy Heath, and Sam Jones. The group performed irregularly for a number of years and in 1980 released a self-titled album on the Strata-East label (SES-8003) containing material recorded between 1969 and 1975.

Hinton taught for nearly twenty years, as a visiting professor of jazz studies at Hunter College and Baruch College, first offering a jazz workshop at Hunter in late 1973. During this time he regularly appeared at jazz festivals, parties, and cruises; performing annually at Dick Gibson's jazz parties in Colorado, the Odessa and Midland jazz parties in Texas beginning in 1967, and Don and Sue Miller's jazz parties in Phoenix and Scottsdale.

He played at the first Newport Jazz Festival in 1954 and was a regular at Newport and other jazz festivals produced by George Wein throughout the next four decades. He was a favorite at the Bern Jazz Festival in Switzerland, sponsored by Hans Zurbruegg and Marianne Gauer. In 1977, he recorded with Earl Hines and Lionel Hampton. For much of the 1980s and 1990s, Hinton was featured on jazz cruises organized by Hank O'Neal, then owner of Chiaroscuro Records.

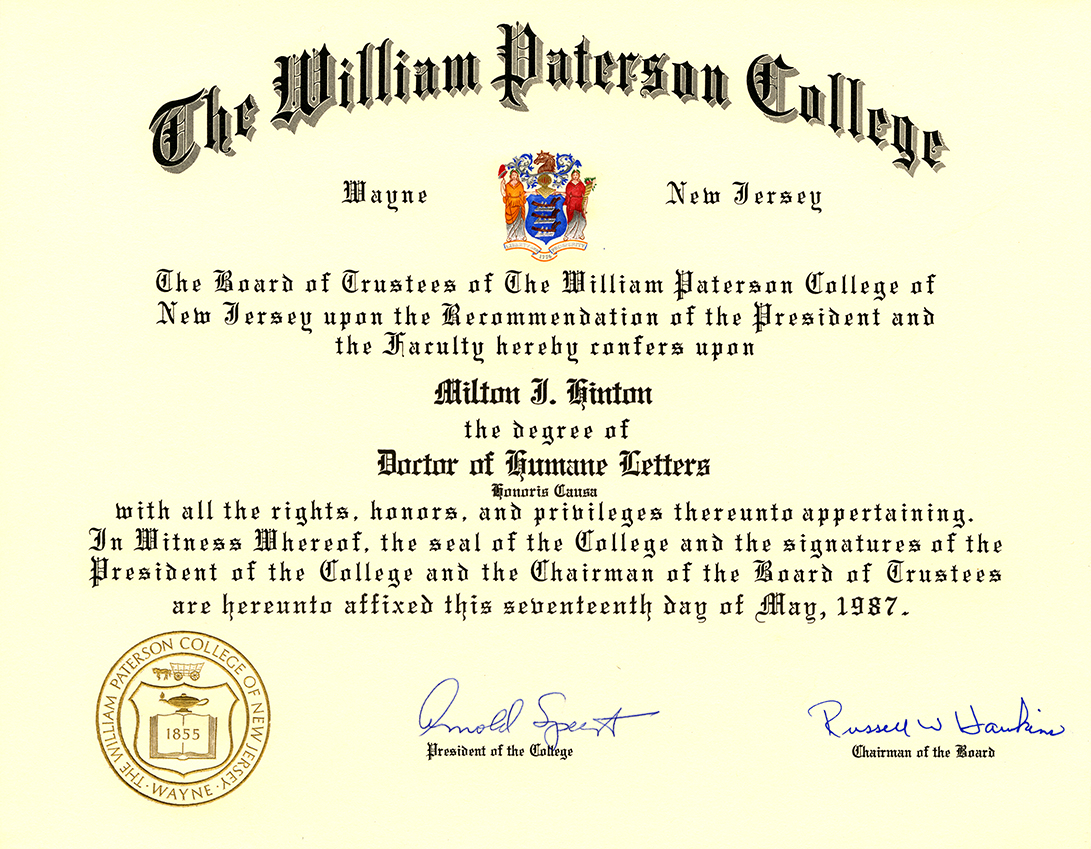
Honorary Doctorate awarded to Milt Hinton by William Patterson College (1987)

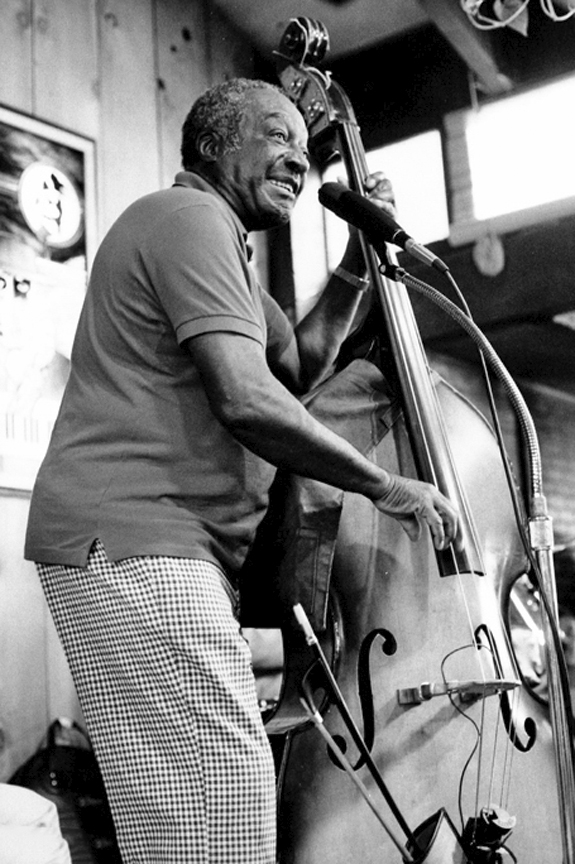
"Judge" Milt Hinton at Bach Dancing & Dynamite Society, Half Moon Bay CA 7/26/87

By the 1990s, he was revered as an elder statesman in jazz, and he was regularly honored with significant awards and accolades. He received honorary doctorates from William Paterson College, Skidmore College, Hamilton College, DePaul University, Trinity College, the Berklee College of Music, Fairfield University, and Baruch College of the City University of New York. He won the Eubie Award from the New York Chapter of the National Academy of Recording Arts and Sciences, the Living Treasure Award from the Smithsonian Institution, and he was the first recipient of the Three Keys Award in Bern, Switzerland. In 1993, he was awarded the highly prestigious National Endowment for the Arts Jazz Master Fellowship. He also contributed to the NEA's Jazz Oral History Program, continuing a longstanding practice of recording interviews with friends in his basement during extended visits. In 1996 he received a New York State Governor's Arts Award, in March 1998 he was awarded the Artist Achievement Award by the Governor of Mississippi, and in 2000 his name was installed on ASCAP's Wall of Fame.

In 1990, Hinton's 80th year, WRTI-FM in Philadelphia produced a series of twenty-eight short programs in which he chronicled his life. These were aired nationwide by more than one hundred fifty public radio stations and received a Gabriel Award that year as Best National Short Feature. In the same year George Wein produced a concert as a part of the JVC Jazz Festival in honor of Hinton's 80th birthday. Similar concerts were produced for his 85th and 90th birthdays. By 1996, he ceased performing on bass, due to a number of physical ailments, and he died at the age of 90 on December 19, 2000.

== Musicianship ==
Hinton was broadly regarded as a consummate sideman, possessing a sensitivity for appropriately applying his formidable technique and his extensive harmonic knowledge to the performance at hand. He was equally adept at bowing, pizzicato, and "slapping," a technique for which he first became famous while playing with the Cab Calloway Orchestra early in his career. He was also an accomplished sight-reader, a skill which he developed on the road with Calloway and honed during his several decades of studio work. As he described his technical diversity, "Working with Cab for sixteen years could have made me stale. You play the same music over and over, and after awhile you can do it in your sleep. Many guys liked it that way because it was easy. But when the band business got bad, they weren't prepared to do anything else. On the other hand, I was able to work on radio and TV and get all kinds of record dates. In a real way, practicing and discipline paid off."

== Hinton Photographic Collection ==
Hinton received his first camera, a 35mm Argus C3, on his 25th birthday in 1935. He later moved on to a Leica, then a Canon 35mm range-finder, and by the 1960s to a Nikon F. Between 1935 and 1999 Hinton took thousands of photographs, approximately 60,000 of which now comprise the Milton J. Hinton Photographic Collection, co-directed by David G. Berger and Holly Maxson. The Collection includes 35mm black and white negatives and color transparencies, reference and exhibition-quality prints, and photographs given to and collected by Hinton throughout his life. The work depicts an extensive range of jazz artists and popular performers in varied settings - on the road, in recording studios, at parties, and at home - over a period of six decades.

Beginning in the early 1960s, Hinton and Berger worked together to organize the photographs and identify the subjects of the photos. In June 1981, Hinton had his first one-person photographic exhibition in Philadelphia, and since then items from the Collection have been featured in dozens of exhibits across the country and in Europe.

Photographs from the Collection have also regularly appeared in periodicals, calendars, postcards, CD liner notes, films, and books. Hinton and Berger co-wrote Bass Line: The Stories and Photographs of Milt Hinton (Temple University Press, 1988), and with the addition of Holly Maxson, the three co-wrote OverTime: The Jazz Photographs of Milt Hinton (Pomegranate Art Books, 1991) and Playing the Changes: Milt Hinton's Life in Stories and Photographs (Vanderbilt University Press, 2008). Notable documentary films that have drawn upon the Collection include The Long Night of Lady Day (Billie Holiday), The Brute and the Beautiful (Ben Webster), and Listen Up (Quincy Jones). A Great Day in Harlem, a 1994 documentary about Esquire's photographic shoot of jazz legends in 1958, features numerous photographs by Milt as well as a home movie shot by Mona. In late 2002 Berger and Maxson utilized the Collection along with a number of original interviews with Hinton's friends and colleagues to produce the documentary film Keeping Time: The Life, Music & Photographs of Milt Hinton. It debuted at the London Film Festival, won the Audience Award at the Tribeca Film Festival in 2003, and has been shown at film festivals both domestically and abroad.

== Legacy ==
In 1980, in honor of Hinton's 70th birthday, his friends and associates worked to create the Milton J. Hinton Scholarship Fund, which was used to help support the musical studies of a variety of bass students over the next four decades. Today the fund is administered by the New Jersey Performing Arts Center, where it is used to provide scholarships to students attending the biennial Milton J. Hinton Summer Institute for Studio Bass. The institute is a continuation of Hinton's longstanding goal to educate and inspire future generations of musicians. As he noted when discussing one of his own bass teachers, "For [Dmitri Shmuklovsky], passing on his skill and knowledge to the next generation was a solemn duty. It was a mission that went beyond his music. And looking back, I know his greatest gift was to teach me this strong sense of responsibility. It's the reason I've always tried to help young people. If someone wants to improve, if they have a sincere desire to learn, I've always tried to be there to give them whatever I can."

== Discography ==
- Everywhere and Beefsteak Charlie (1945)
- And Say It Again (1947)
- Just Plain Blues (1947)
- If You Believed in Me (Staff 1947)
- Meditation Jeffonese (Staff 1947)
- Milt Hinton: East Coast Jazz 5 (1955)
- Basses Loaded (1955)
- The Rhythm Section (1956)
- Percussion and Bass (Everest, 1960) with Jo Jones
- Here Swings the Judge (1964)
- Bassically with Blue (1976)
- The Trio (1977)
- Just the Two of Us (1981)
- The Judge's Decision (1984)
- Back to Bass-ics (1984)
- Hayward and Hinton (1987)
- The Basement Tapes (1989)
- Old Man Time (1989)
- Marian McPartland's Piano Jazz with Guest Milt Hinton (1991)
- The Trio 1994 (1994)
- Laughing at Life (1994)
- The Judge at His Best: The Legendary Chiaroscuro Sessions, 1973-1995 (1995)
