= Joe Evans (saxophonist) =

- Born: Joseph James Evans; October 7, 1916; Bonifay, Florida, U.S.
- Died: January 17, 2014 (aged 97) Richmond, Virginia, U.S.
- Genres: Jazz
- Occupation: Musician
- Instrument: Alto saxophone
- Labels: Carnival Records

Joe Evans (October 7, 1916 – January 17, 2014) was an American jazz alto saxophonist.

== Early life and education ==
Evans was born in Bonifay and grew up in Pensacola, Florida. Evans dropped out of high school and moved to New York City to pursue his music career. He later earned a GED and associate degree from Essex County College in 1973. Through a Ford Family Foundation scholarship, he earned a Master of Education degree from Rutgers University in 1975.

== Career ==
Evans was active between 1939 and 1965, playing in the big bands of Jay McShann, Jimmy Forrest and Gene Ramey; Don Redman and Louis Armstrong. In 1944 he recorded with Mary Lou Williams, as a member of a band including Coleman Hawkins, Bill Coleman and Denzil Best. At the beginning of 1945, he recorded for J. Mayo Williams's independent label, Chicago, leading a combo comprising Jesse Drakes, Duke Jordan, Gene Ramey, J. C. Heard and Etta Jones.

Later that same year and in 1946, he recorded with Andy Kirk's orchestra as part of a lineup that included Fats Navarro, Reuben Phillips, Jimmy Forrest, Eddie "Lockjaw" Davis, Hank Jones, Floyd Smith, Al Hall and Ben Thigpen. Other musicians he performed and recorded with include Cab Calloway, Billie Holiday, Bill "Bojangles" Robinson and Lionel Hampton.

In 1961, Evans founded Carnival Records. After earning his master's degree, Evans retired from music and worked as a dairy inspector for the state of New Jersey.

In 2008, University of Illinois Press published his autobiography, Follow Your Heart, co-authored by Christopher Brooks, a professor of anthropology at Virginia Commonwealth University.

== Personal life ==
Evans died in Richmond, Virginia of renal disease in January 2014 at the age of 97.
