= Dick Wilson (musician) =

American jazz saxophonist (1911–1941)

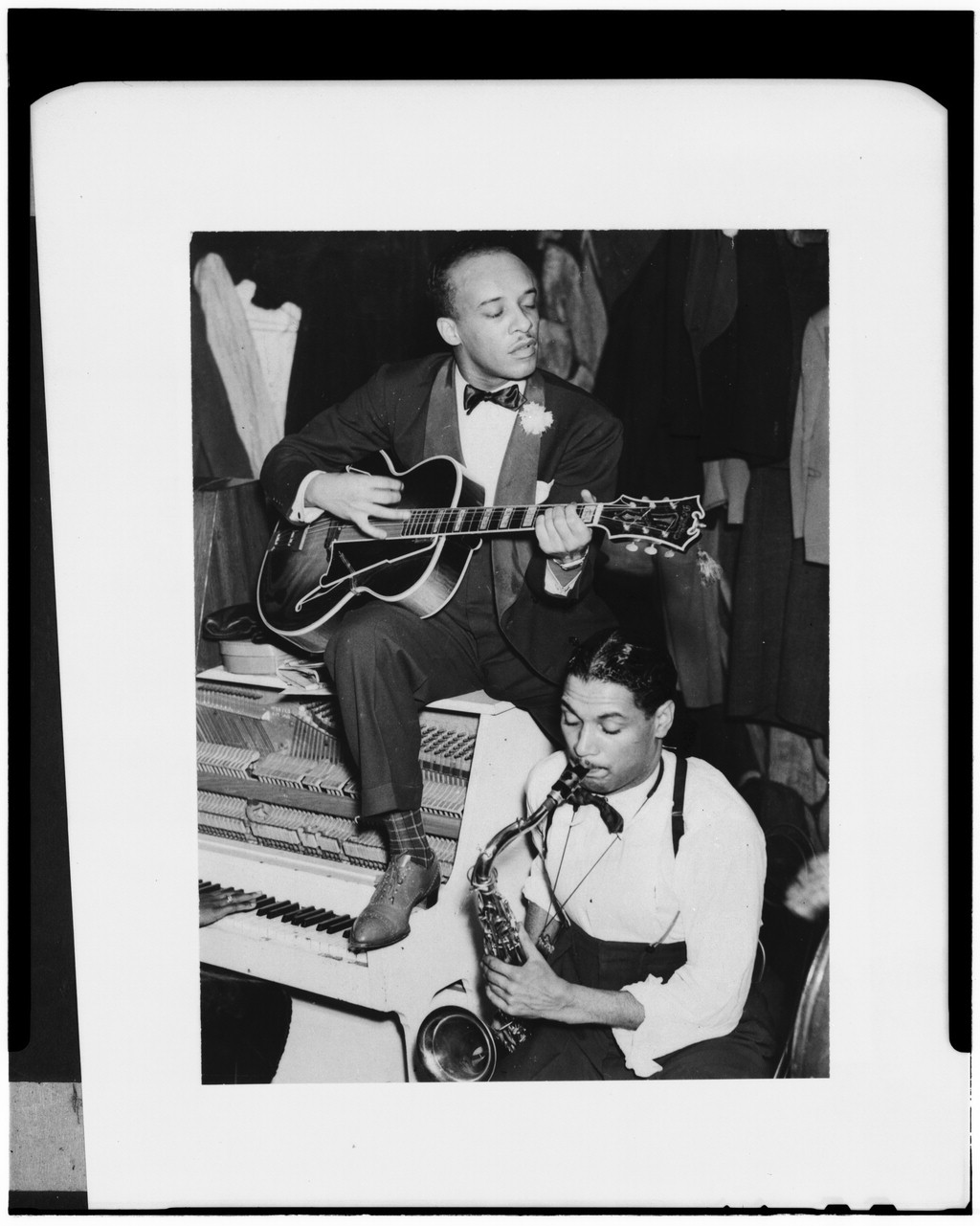
- Wilson (bottom) with Floyd Smith at the Howard Theatre, Washington, D.C., c. 1941

Background information
- Born: November 11, 1911; Mount Vernon, Illinois, U.S.
- Died: November 24, 1941 (aged 30) New York City, U.S.
- Genres: Jazz
- Occupation: Musician
- Instrument: Tenor saxophone

Dick Wilson (November 11, 1911 – November 24, 1941) was an American jazz tenor saxophonist, best known for his work with the Andy Kirk big band.

== Biography ==
Wilson was born in Mount Vernon, Illinois, raised in Seattle, and went to high school in Los Angeles. He started on piano and learned saxophone in Seattle from saxophonist Joe Darensbourg. He became a member of Darensbourg's band in 1930. In 1936, he joined Andy Kirk's Clouds of Joy. Wilson was a member of Kirk's band until 1941 when he died of tuberculosis in New York City.

Along with Mary Lou Williams and Pha Terrell, Wilson was one of the most striking musical personalities in the band. He cultivated a style that has been compared to Lester Young's because of similar characteristics in their solos.
