= John Overton Williams =

American jazz musician (1905–1996)

- Also known as: "Bearcat"
- Born: John Overton Williams; April 13, 1905; Memphis, Tennessee, U.S.
- Died: November 24, 1996 (aged 91) Columbus, Ohio, U.S.
- Genre: Jazz
- Occupations: Musician, record producer
- Instrument: Saxophone

John Overton "Bearcat" Williams (April 13, 1905 – November 24, 1996) was an American jazz reedist.

Williams was born in Memphis, Tennessee, but moved to Kansas City in his youth and learned to play saxophone there as a teenager, playing in a local dance band and touring with the vaudeville revue, Hits 'n Bits, in the first half of the 1920s. While with this show he met pianist Mary Elfrieda Scruggs, who became both a personal and professional companion; the pair married in 1926 and Mary Lou played piano in Williams' Synco Jazzers band on their 1927 tour and recording session. He then played with Terrence Holder's band, which Andy Kirk took over soon after; Williams played with Kirk for nearly a decade alongside his wife.

In 1939 he left Kirk's group, and divorced Williams the following year. He went into the restaurant industry in the 1940s, but still played on the side with Cootie Williams and for several years with Earl Hines on baritone sax. His last performances were in the late 1940s, after which he worked in hospitality and in a factory. He died in Columbus, Ohio, aged 91.
