= Mary Lou Williams (album) =

Mary Lou Williams Presents / Black Christ of the Andes

Studio album by Mary Lou Williams
- Released: 1964
- Studio: Cue Studios, NYC; Nola Studios, NYC
- Genre: Jazz * Sacred Jazz
- Length: 52:27
- Language: English
- Label: Folkways, Mary
- Producer: Tommy Nola

Mary Lou Williams chronology
Messin' 'Round in Montmartre (1959)	Mary Lou Williams Presents / Black Christ of the Andes (1964)	Music for Peace (1970)

Mary Lou Williams, alternatively titled Black Christ of the Andes, is a jazz album by pianist Mary Lou Williams, which was released in 1964 by Folkways Records. Released after Williams's conversion to Catholicism, the album incorporates a variety of styles from spirituals, blues and avant-garde jazz. The title track is a choral Mass hymn in honor of the Afro-Peruvian saint St. Martin de Porres.

== Background ==
Following the amendments to the Constitution of Sacred Liturgy by the Second Vatican Council in 1962, Williams was encouraged by her peers in the church to create a work of "sacred jazz." Williams, who had hardly written or performed since her appearance at the Newport Jazz Festival in 1957. In the mid-50s, Williams had converted to Catholicism following a spiritual journey. At the time of Vatican II, Williams was a member of St. Francis Xavier Church of Greenwich Village, where she was known by members of the parish community for her talents.

In 1962, she wrote "St. Martin de Porres" in preparation of the feast day for Martin de Porres's sainthood. This would become the basis for the compilation work to follow. The record primarily features original works by Williams with covers of previous works to expand her developing idiom of sacred jazz.

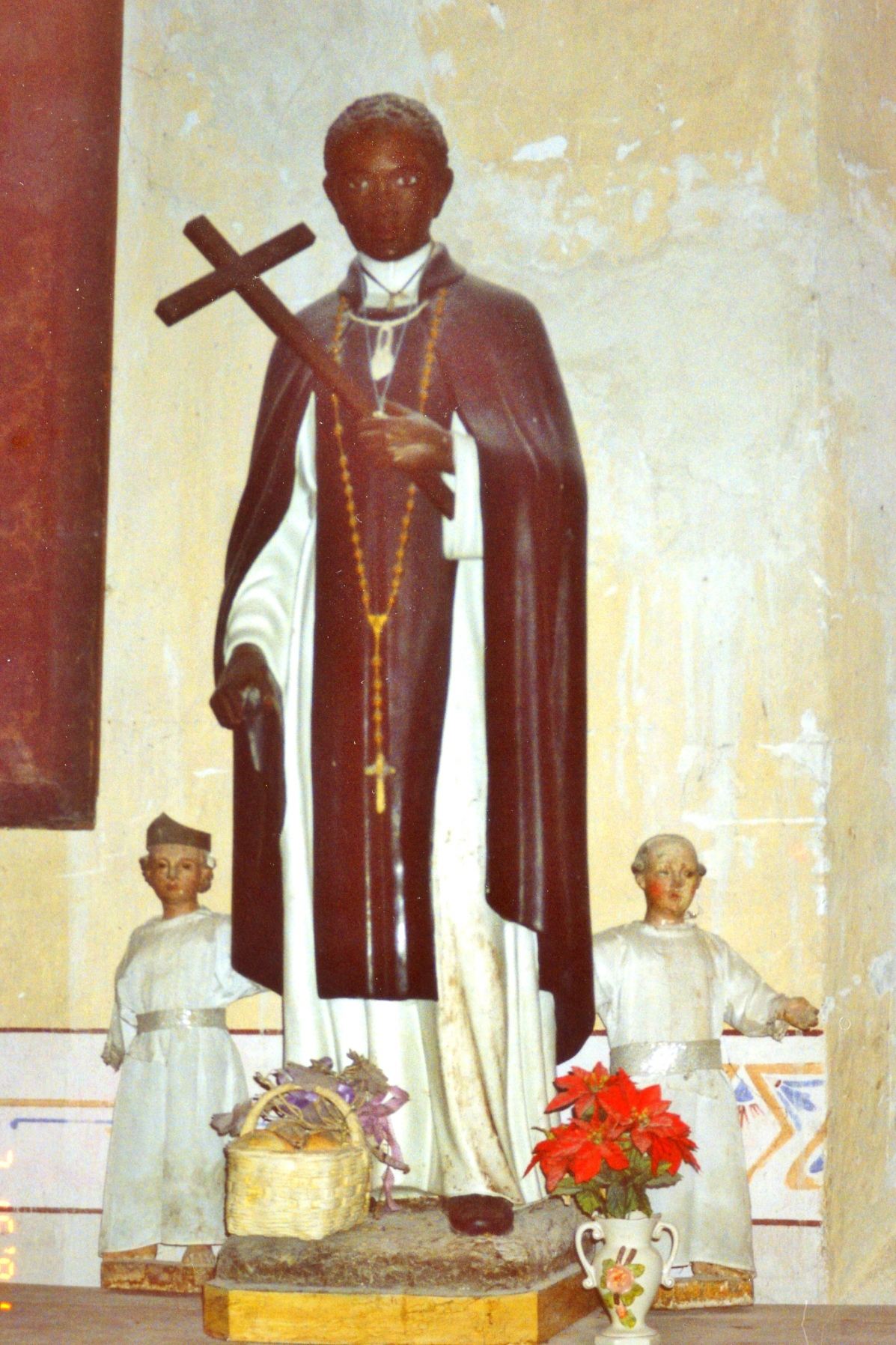
Martin de Porres

== Reception and legacy ==
Retrospective professional reviews
Review scores
Source	Rating
AllMusic	4/5 stars

The album was listed at #140 in Pitchfork's Top 200 Greatest Albums of the 1960s, with critic Seth Colter Walls describing it as 'visionary'. AllMusic singled out Williams' piano solos as a highlight of the album.

== Track listing ==
No.	Title	Writer(s)	Length
1.	"St. Martin de Porres"	Mary Lou Williams	6:36
2.	"It Ain't Necessarily So"	George Gershwin/Ira Gershwin	4:45
3.	"The Devil"	Ada Moore/Mary Lou Williams	4:04
4.	"Miss D.D."	Mary Lou Williams	2:32
5.	"Anima Christi"	Mary Lou Williams	2:50
6.	"A Grand Night for Swinging"	Billy Taylor	2:52
7.	"My Blue Heaven"	Walter Donaldson/George A. Whiting	3:10
8.	"Dirge Blues"	Mary Lou Williams	3:26
9.	"A Fungus Amungus"	Mary Lou Williams	3:01
10.	"Koolbonga"	Mary Lou Williams	3:25
11.	"Forty-Five Degree Angle"	Denzil Best	2:55
12.	"Nicole"	Mary Lou Williams	3:41
13.	"Chunka Lunka"		3:11
14.	"Praise the Lord"	Mary Lou Williams	5:54
Total length:			52:22
