= Zodiac Suite =

1945 jazz composition by Mary Lou Williams

- by Mary Lou Williams
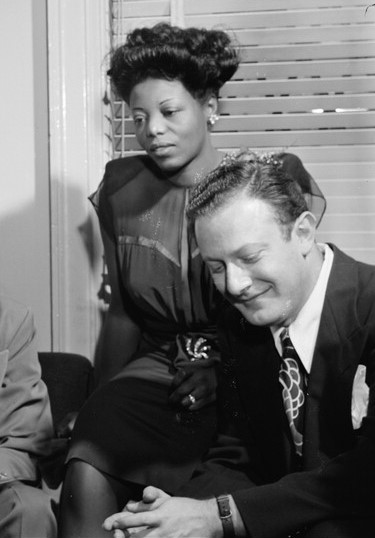
- Mary Lou Williams with Milt Orent who assisted with some of the arrangements for Zodiac Suite
- Year: 1945
- Genre: Third stream
- Composed: 1942–1945
- Recorded: 1945
- Movements: 12
- Scoring: Chamber jazz group or symphony orchestra

Zodiac Suite is a series of 12 pieces of jazz music written by the American jazz pianist and composer Mary Lou Williams and first performed in 1945. The suite makes use of elements of classical music alongside jazz, and Williams was influenced by modernism when writing and arranging it. Each song in the suite is inspired by an astrological sign and musicians or performers who were born under it. Williams began writing music for Zodiac Suite in 1942 and finished the composition in 1945.

Williams first recorded the suite as part of a trio for Asch records and followed this with two notable performances with larger groups. The first performance was with a chamber jazz group and the second was with a symphony orchestra at Carnegie Hall in New York City. These performances took such a toll on Williams that she took a break from performing shortly afterwards.

While the Asch recording was well received by critics, the contemporary reception to the two concerts was mixed. Zodiac Suite is notable as an early instance of the fusion of classical and jazz music. Williams's recording and initial performances of the suite have been recognised as breakthroughs in the history of jazz.

== Music ==
"Aries"
Sample of the boogie-woogie style used at the start of the song.

"Aries"
Sample of the classical style used near the end of the song.

Zodiac Suite is a series of 12 distinct but conceptually linked short pieces of music each representing a sign of the zodiac composed by American musician Mary Lou Williams. The suite was originally written for small group performance: six songs for a trio, five songs for a solo piano and one song for a duet of piano and bass. The music has features of classical music alongside the musical language of blues and jazz. A demonstration of this is given in "Aries", where the music moves from the sounds of boogie-woogie to dissonance within the first minute and a half of the piece. Suspended chords, whole-tone scales and contrasting use of major and minor are used throughout the suite. Scholar Richard Thompson noted the wide variance of styles in the suite, which included "20th century European piano preludes, blues boogie-woogie, vamps, ABA sectional forms, which often contrast jazz and classical writing, free piano cadenzas, standard song progressions and forms." Jazz scholar Mark Tucker proposed that the suite is "part of a larger stream of American composition" which encompasses the work of Paul Whiteman, Ferde Grofé, Peter DeRose, Alec Wilder, Bix Beiderbecke and Willard Robison. American academic Farah Griffin compared the suite to trumpeter Miles Davis's 1959 album Kind of Blue, and wrote that Zodiac Suite "leaps ahead a decade, previewing the sounds that would dominate the late fifties" Williams later created an orchestral score for the suite based on the influence of American composer Duke Ellington's longer works and European composers like Béla Bartók, Igor Stravinsky and Paul Hindemith. The orchestrated rendering of the suite integrated the individual pieces into a more unified work.

== Composition and first performances ==
=== Composition and Asch recording ===
Williams began writing Zodiac Suite in 1942 after borrowing a book on astrology. She was interested in the idea of writing music inspired by the star signs of her musician friends. The first three compositions were for "Scorpio", "Gemini" and "Taurus". Ellington's extended jazz piece Black, Brown and Beige had given Williams the idea to create an orchestral work that reached outside of jazz music norms. The suite was also influenced by classical composers such as Bartók. Williams explained that the Zodiac Suite was "the beginning of a real fulfilment of one of my ambitions".

Williams had hoped to finish the suite for a live performance on the radio station WNEW in 1945 with Al Lucas on bass and Jack Parker on drums. By the time of the performance, she still only had compositions for three star signs. The remaining nine signs were improvised live on air. The performance received a positive reception and Williams subsequently recorded Zodiac Suite with the same trio for Asch records.

Most pieces in the suite were dedicated to or influenced by other performers and their star sign. "Aries" was for Ben Webster and Billie Holiday; "Taurus" for Duke Ellington; "Gemini" for Shorty Baker; "Cancer" for Lem Davis; "Leo" for Vic Dickenson; "Libra" for Art Tatum, Dizzy Gillespie, Bud Powell, Thelonious Monk, Charlie Parker and John Coltrane; "Scorpio" for Ethel Waters, Katherine Dunham and Al Lucas; "Sagittarius" for Eddie Heywood; "Capricorn" for Pearl Primus and Frankie Newton; "Aquarius" for Josh White and Eartha Kitt; and "Pisces" for Al Hall and Barney Josephson.

While Williams appeared pleased with the recording for Asch, she had ideas for new ways to perform the suite. She began working on arranging the pieces for larger bands in a concert-hall environment. At the time, Williams had a personal relationship with Milton Orent, an arranger for television network NBC. With Orent, Williams listened to and discussed the work of modernist composers like Arnold Schoenberg and Stravinsky. She credited Orent with influencing her musical growth. Orent worked with Williams on the arrangements but the extent of his input is unclear. The revised score gave more opportunities for improvisation.

=== Town Hall and Carnegie Hall performances ===
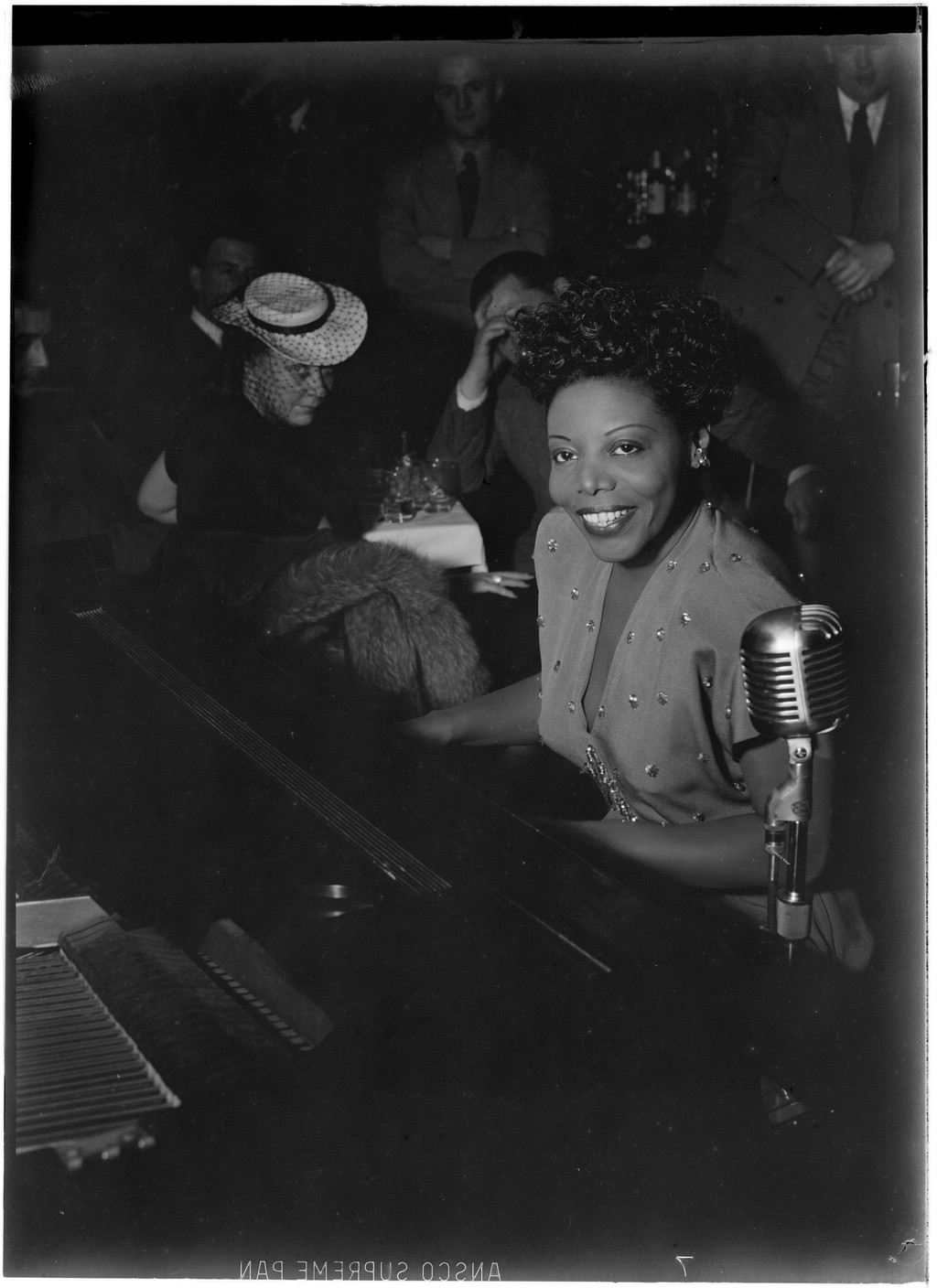
Williams performing at Café Society, where she worked before the Town Hall concert

At the end of 1945, Williams performed Zodiac Suite at Town Hall with Edmond Hall's chamber-jazz group. Williams had to borrow money to stage the concert. The work required to prepare for the concert was so extensive that Williams took leave from her job at Café Society to work on it full-time. The performance on 31 December was to a half-empty venue. The musicians were under-rehearsed and struggled with the music's improvisational nature. Williams' piano playing lacked its usual vibrancy, and Orent, who was conducting, lost a page of music which confused the musicians. Critical reaction to the concert was split. Williams herself was severely upset with the performance, and was ill for the following week.

The concert was recorded but the tapes were missing when Williams went to retrieve them. They are suspected to have been stolen by the Danish jazz enthusiast Timme Rosenkrantz for use on pirate records in Europe. Journalist Chris Albertson noted that Rosenkrantz released music from Zodiac Suite on the Selmer record label using different song titles. Williams was never paid for this release. The concert was eventually released in full in the 1990s.

In June 1946, Williams performed Zodiac Suite with a 70-member symphony orchestra at New York's Carnegie Hall after being approached by the concert promoter Norman Granz. Because of the expense of a concert on this scale, Williams again had to pay for some of the organisational expenses. The German jazz critic Dan Morgenstern considers the Carnegie Hall concert to be the first time a symphony orchestra performed jazz compositions. Williams was happy with the performance. However, the string section performed poorly, and, according to William's biographer Linda Dahl, the suite "collapsed under the weight of a full orchestra".

The concert was taped, and Williams took precautions to avoid losing the recording as before. She arranged for Rosenkrantz, whom Williams at the time did not suspect of the Town Hall theft, to guard the tapes. The tapes went missing with Rosenkrantz again suspected of purloining them. Working on the Zodiac Suite took a physical and emotional toll on Williams, and she subsequently took a break from performing.

== Subsequent performances ==
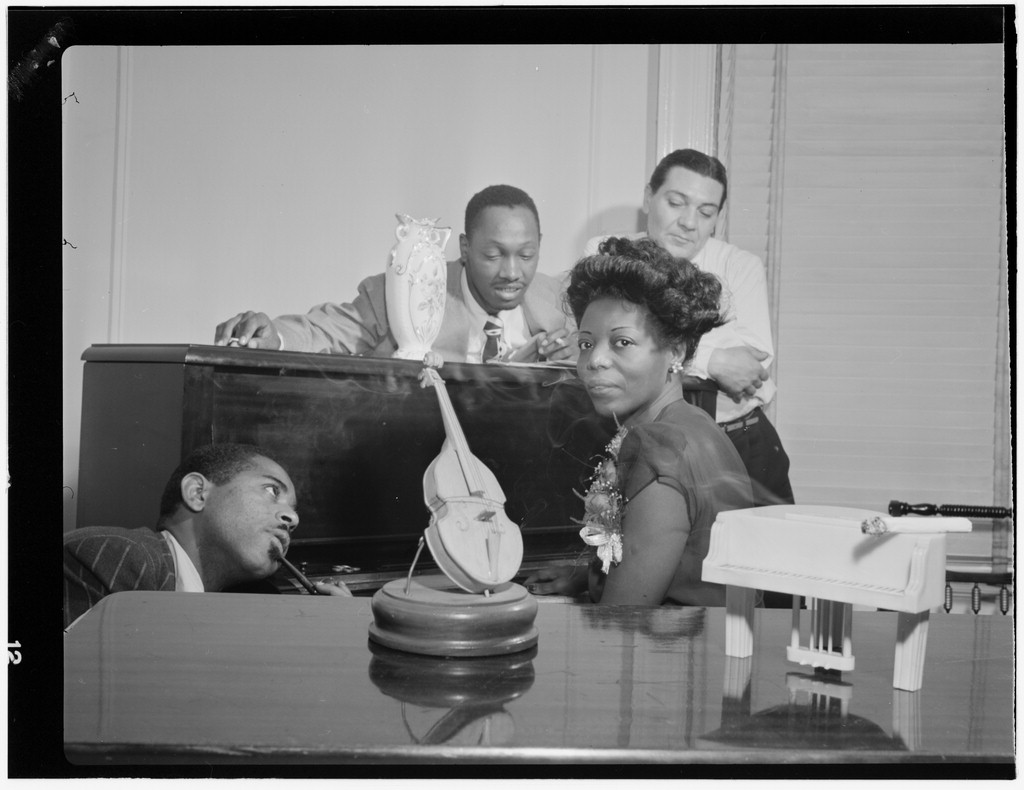
Mary Lou Williams and Dizzy Gillespie (bottom left), with whom she would later perform music from Zodiac Suite

=== Performances by Williams ===
Williams performed parts of Zodiac Suite with a trio in 1947 for an National Association for the Advancement of Colored People benefit concert at Syracuse University. She had initially been invited by a Syracuse student to perform a symphonic version of the suite, but her fee for this was too high for the university's budget.

In 1957, she performed with the trumpeter Dizzy Gillespie at the Newport Jazz Festival a medley of three songs from the suite ("Virgo", "Libre" and "Aries") that was included on an album of the concert. This was one of Williams's first public performances in many years. With the jazz arranger Melba Liston, Williams planned an arrangement of the suite for the pianist Thelonious Monk but the project never materialised. In 1969, Williams performed music from the suite on Vatican Radio.

=== Performances by others ===
Pearl Primus, Katherine Dunham and Talley Beatty all choreographed dances to sections of the suite in the 1940s. The American musician Geri Allen, who played Williams in the film Kansas City, recorded Zodiac Suite Revisited with the Mary Lou Williams Collective in 2006. In 2021, Zodiac Suite was performed by the New York Philharmonic, conducted by Tito Muñoz, and by the Kansas City Jazz Orchestra. The same year, the pianist Chris Pattishall released an interpretation of the suite called Zodiac.

== Critical reception ==
Zodiac Suite was considered novel in jazz music when it was first performed, both thematically and musically, due to its references to and use of classical music. The work's symphonic nature makes it a precursor to the third stream genre which combines jazz and classical music. Writer Richard Lawn described the combination of jazz and classical as "unique and groundbreaking". The black community viewed the suite as an accomplishment when it was first performed, and one journalist said the Carnegie Hall concert "completely eroded the whites-only barrier to the Carnegie Hall stage." Both Lawn and the Encyclopedia of African American Music view the suite as a breakthrough for women composers. Ben Ratliff called Zodiac Suite "beautifully coherent" and noted the strong feminine expression in the "unmacho" music.

Jazz reviewers had an overall positive response to Williams's Asch recording. The album was chosen by The Record Review as their record of the month and was one of Metronome's albums of the year. In his review of the reissue of the album, Tucker wrote that the recording highlights Williams's ability "not just as composer but as improviser". In 2020, the album was inducted into the Grammy Hall of Fame. At the time, the Town Hall arrangement received encouraging reviews from jazz critics, but classical music critics were mostly less sympathetic. Paul Bowles described the performance as "neither fish nor foul" in its attempt to marry American jazz and French impressionism. A review in The New York Times called the suite "rather ambitious" and "scarcely a jazz piece at all". Barry Ulanov deemed the concert a "brave try, a partial success" as well as the "music of the future". The Town Hall performance is placed by The Penguin Jazz Guide as a "key moment in the recognition of jazz as an important twentieth-century music". Williams said that Zodiac Suite earned her "the name of musician's musician instead of the Boogie Woogie Queen".

== Structure ==
Zodiac Suite is composed of

- Aries - 1:51
- Taurus - 2:35
- Gemini - 2:12
- Cancer - 2:34
- Leo - 1:45
- Virgo - 2:29
- Libra - 2:11
- Scorpio - 3:04
- Sagittarius - 1:52
- Capricorn - 2:41
- Aquarius - 3:40
- Pisces - 2:34

Time lengths given above reference the original 1945 Asch recording.

== Recordings ==
Dave Douglas

- "Aries" on Soul on Soul (RCA, 2000)

Virginia Mayhew Quartet

- "Cancer" on Mary Lou Williams – The Next 100 Years (Renma, 2011)

Chris Pattishall:

- Zodiac (self-published, 2021)

Mary Lou Williams:

- Zodiac Suite (Asch Records, 1945) – original issue; (Smithsonian/Folkways, 1995) – re-issue
- The Complete Town Hall Concert of December 31, 1945 (Jazz Classics Records, 1996)
- "Virgo", "Libra" and "Aries" on Dizzy Gillespie at Newport (Verve, 1957)

The Mary Lou Williams Collective (a group consisting of Geri Allen, Andrew Cyrille, Billy Hart, Buster Williams):

- Zodiac Suite: Revisited (Mary Records, 2006)

Jeong Lim Yang

- Zodiac Suite: Reassured (Fresh Sound New Talent, 2022)

Aaron Diehl and the Knights

- Zodiac Suite (Mack Avenue, 2023)

Umlaut Chamber Orchestra

- Zodiac Suite (Umlaut, 2023)

== Sources ==
- Cook, Richard; Morton, Brian (2006). The Penguin Guide to Jazz Recordings. London: Penguin. ISBN 0-14-102327-9. OCLC 70229849.
- Cramer, Alfred William (2009). Musicians & Composers of the 20th Century. Pasadena, Calif.: Salem Press. ISBN 978-1-58765-528-9. OCLC 433070774.
- Dahl, Linda (1999). Morning Glory: A Biography of Mary Lou Williams. New York: Pantheon Books. ISBN 978-0-375-40899-1.
- Griffin, Farah Jasmine (2013). Harlem Nocturne: Women Artists & Progressive Politics During World War II. New York: Basic Civitas. ISBN 978-0-465-01875-8.
- Harbison, Patrick Lewis; Moore, Gregory Kehl (1997). "Jazzwomen Compose". In Pendle, Karin (ed.). American Women Composers. Psychology Press. ISBN 978-90-5702-145-9.
- Hairston, Monica (2008). "Gender, Jazz and the Popular Front". In Rustin, Nichole T.; Tucker, Sherrie (eds.). Big Ears: Listening for Gender in Jazz Studies. Durham: Duke University Press. ISBN 978-0-8223-4336-3.
- Kernodle, Tammy L. (2020). Soul on Soul: The Life and Music of Mary Lou Williams. Urbana: University of Illinois Press. ISBN 978-0-252-04360-4.
- Lawn, Richard (2013). Experiencing Jazz (2nd ed.). New York: Routledge. ISBN 9-780-415-69960-0.
- Price, Emmett George; Kernodle, Tammy L.; Maxile, Horace J. Jr. (2011). Encyclopedia of African American music. Santa Barbara, Calif.: ABC-CLIO. ISBN 978-0-313-34200-4. OCLC 699474764.
- Ratliff, Ben (2002). Jazz: A critic's guide to the 100 most important recordings. New York: Times Books. ISBN 0-8050-7068-0. OCLC 49679630.
- Witkowski, Deanna (2021). Mary Lou Williams: Music for the Soul. Collegeville, MN: Liturgical Press. ISBN 978-0-8146-6401-8.
