= Carnival Records =

American record label

- Founded: 1961
- Country of origin: United States

Carnival Records was the name given to at least two record labels.

== Carnival Records (1961–1962) ==
In 1961, Herb Alpert and Jerry Moss started a short-lived label that was the precursor to A&M Records. They released two singles. "Tell It to the Birds"/"Fallout Shelter" by Dore Alpert was distributed by Dot Records outside California.

== Carnival Records (1962–1983) ==
Jazz saxophonist Joe Evans set up Carnival Records label in the early 1960s and based it in New York and relocated in Newark, New Jersey, in 1963. Releasing 63 singles and two albums, the label focus was rhythm and blues and soul music. Joe Evans ran the label with a small staff that included his wife. The final record was released in 1983.

Carnival's biggest success was The Manhattans, a band signed in August 1964.

Carnival Records is exclusively represented by Westwood Music Group.

== See also ==
- List of record labels
