= Zoning (Mary Lou Williams album) =

Studio album by Mary Lou Williams
- Released: October 1974
- Recorded: Jan–Mar 1974
- Venue: New York
- Studio: A & R Studios
- Genre: Jazz
- Length: 54:35
- Label: Mary Records / Smithsonian Folkways
- Producers: Mary Lou Williams, Peter F. O'Brien

Mary Lou Williams chronology
From the Heart (1971)	Zoning (1974)	Free Spirits (1975)

CD version (1995)

Professional ratings
Review scores
Source	Rating
Allmusic	4/5 stars
The Penguin Guide to Jazz	4/4 stars
The Rolling Stone Jazz & Blues Album Guide	3.5/5 stars
The Virgin Encyclopedia of Jazz	4/5 stars

Zoning is a studio album by American jazz pianist Mary Lou Williams, released in 1974 by Mary Records. It was arranged by Williams and features her in duo and trio settings, mostly with bassist Bob Cranshaw and drummer Mickey Roker. In 1995, Smithsonian Folkways reissued the album on compact disc with a different track listing, new cover art, and two previously unreleased recordings.

== Reception ==
Upon its release in 1974, Zoning was consistently well received. Jazz critic Gary Giddins chose it as one of the ten best albums of the year in his Village Voice column. In an earlier review, he said that Williams "has been opening doors onto the future for almost 40 years; 'Zoning,' a subtle study of her piano playing and writing, is no different; it took me a while to get into, but now I find her melodies floating through my mind like breezes through a summer door."

Phyl Garland at Ebony magazine called Zoning a "dynamite album" and said, "As the true mistress of her art, she spans all musical generations and as a leader of the pack in any era, she always has played the 'new music.' How anyone could sound this fresh after 50 years at the keyboard is almost beyond comprehension." Garland referred to Williams as "the first lady of jazz" and praised her "adventuresome spirit" in "Zoning Fungus II," where "she employs atonal harmonies before settling down to a steady funky base. This is music for a woman of all seasons, from the pensive Ellingtonian drift of Ghost of Love, through the sophisticated instrumental shouts of Praise the Lord and the contemporary soulful insistence of Play It Momma."

Billboard said, "With her masterful touch and ability to compose genius, this is a very welcome album to any listener's collection." They highlighted "Medi I" and "Medi II" among Best Cuts and praised her "incredible sidemen."

Reviewing the 1995 CD reissue, Scott Yanow at Allmusic called Zoning "one of her finest recordings of her later years." He said Williams "sounds 40 years younger, shows the influence of McCoy Tyner, and hints at free jazz in spots. An often surprising set of modern jazz."

== Track listing ==
=== Side 1 ===
1. "Intermission" (Mary Lou Williams, Milton Suggs) - 1:26
2. "Holy Ghost" (Larry Gales) - 5:20
3. "Zoning Fungus II" (Williams) - 6:48
4. "Ghost of Love" (Williams) - 4:52
5. "Medi II" (Williams) - 2:03
6. "Gloria" (Williams, Robert Ledogar) - 6:23

=== Side 2 ===
1. "Rosa Mae" (Williams, Gales) - 4:27
2. "Olinga" (Dizzy Gillespie) - 3:59
3. "Praise the Lord" (Williams) - 6:35
4. "Play It Momma" (Williams) - 3:52
5. "Medi I" (Williams) - 4:50

=== CD Version (1995) ===
1. "Syl-O-Gism" (Gales) - 3:27 (previously unreleased)
2. "Olinga" (Gillespie) - 4:04
3. "Medi II" (Williams) - 2:07
4. "Gloria" (Williams, Ledogar) - 4:38 (previously unreleased)
5. "Intermission" (Williams, Suggs) - 2:22
6. "Zoning Fungus II" (Williams) - 6:51
7. "Holy Ghost" (Gales) - 5:24
8. "Medi I" (Williams) - 4:55
9. "Rosa Mae" (Williams, Gales) - 4:37
10. "Ghost of Love" (Williams) - 4:37
11. "Praise the Lord" (Williams) - 6:37
12. "Gloria" (Williams, Ledogar) - 6:35
13. "Play It Momma" (Williams) - 4:22

== Personnel ==
- Mary Lou Williams - piano, arranger, producer
- Zita Carno - piano (A1, A3)
- Bob Cranshaw - bass (A1-A5, B1-B2, B5, CD1, CD4)
- Milton Suggs - bass (A6, B3-B4)
- Mickey Roker - drums (A1, A3, A5, B1-B2, CD1, CD4)
- Tony Waters - congas (A6, B3-B4)

=== Technical ===
- Fr. Peter F. O'Brien - producer, liner notes
- Richard Blakin - mixing
- Roger Prigent - cover photography

1995 reissue compiled and produced by Matt Walters.
