= Dizzy Gillespie at Newport =

Live album by Dizzy Gillespie
- Released: 1957
- Recorded: July 6, 1957, Newport, Rhode Island
- Genre: Jazz
- Length: 51:59
- Label: Verve
- Producer: Norman Granz

Dizzy Gillespie chronology
Sittin' In (1957)	Dizzy Gillespie at Newport (1957)	Duets (1957)

Dizzy Gillespie at Newport is a 1957 live album by Dizzy Gillespie, featuring his big band, recorded at the 1957 Newport Jazz Festival.

== Reception ==
The AllMusic review states: "This brilliant CD captures one of the high points of Dizzy Gillespie's remarkable career and is highly recommended."

Professional ratings
Review scores
Source	Rating
AllMusic	5/5 stars
Disc	4/5 stars
The Encyclopedia of Popular Music	4/5 stars

== Track listing ==
1. "Dizzy's Blues" (A. K. Salim) – 11:51
2. "School Days" (Will D. Cobb, Gus Edwards) – 5:47
3. "Doodlin'" (Horace Silver) – 7:56
4. "Manteca" (Gil Fuller, Gillespie, Chano Pozo) – 7:11
5. "I Remember Clifford" (Benny Golson) – 4:48
6. "Cool Breeze" (Tadd Dameron, Billy Eckstine, Gillespie) – 10:33
7. "Zodiac Suite: Virgo/Libra/Aries" (Mary Lou Williams) – 10:28 Bonus track on CD reissue
8. "Carioca" (Edward Eliscu, Gus Kahn, Vincent Youmans) – 3:41 Bonus track on CD reissue
9. "A Night in Tunisia" (Gillespie, Frank Paparelli) – 10:00 Bonus track on CD reissue – Lee Morgan feature

== Personnel ==
- Dizzy Gillespie – trumpet, vocals, arranger (track 4)
- Talib Dawud, Lee Morgan, Ermit V. Perry, Carl Warwick – trumpet
- Chuck Connors, Al Grey, Melba Liston – trombone
- Ernie Henry, Jimmy Powell – alto saxophone
- Benny Golson – tenor saxophone, arranger (track 5)
- Billy Mitchell – tenor saxophone
- Pee Wee Moore – baritone saxophone
- Wynton Kelly (tracks 1–6 & 9), Mary Lou Williams (tracks 7 & 8) – piano
- Paul E. West – double bass
- Charlie Persip – drums
- A. K. Salim (track 1), Tadd Dameron (track 6), Quincy Jones (track 2), Ernie Wilkins (track 3) – arranger
