= EverGreene Architectural Arts =

American specialty contractor

Practice information
- Founders: Jeff Greene
- Founded: 1978
- Location: Headquartered in Brooklyn, NY, with regional offices in Chicago, Washington D.C., and Los Angeles

Significant works and honors
- Projects: Over 1,000 featured projects
- Awards: 293 awards

Website
- https://evergreene.com

EverGreene Architectural Arts (EverGreene) is the largest specialty contractor in the U.S., providing design, restoration, conservation, and adaptive reuse services to commercial, government, institutional, sacred, and theater clients. Established in 1978 by Jeff Greene, EverGreene has grown from a small mural painting studio to a company of artists, conservators, craftsmen, and designers that work throughout the United States and abroad.

== History ==
In 1976, with the advent of the Historic Preservation tax Incentives, interest in historic preservation grew in the United States. EverGreene, originally started as a firm that almost exclusively focused on decorative painting and murals, expanded in size and service offerings to assist clients and owners of historic structures including: courthouses, state capitols, churches, synagogues, theaters and commercial buildings. To execute large scale projects, EverGreene will often partner with architecture firms during the design and planning phases and with general contractors as a provider of specialty expertise and services.

== Projects ==
=== Civic and institutional ===
- Essex County Courthouse, mural restoration (2003). Newark, NJ.
- Colorado State Capitol, restoration, gilding. Denver, CO
- Library of Congress, restoration, decorative paint, ornamental plaster. Washington, DC
- Utah State Capitol, decorative paint, plaster restoration. Salt Lake City, UT
- Thurgood Marshall United States Courthouse, restoration, decorative paint, ornamental plaster. New York, NY
- Clara Barton Missing Soldier's Office, conservation, restoration, wallpaper re-creation. Washington, DC
- Harlem Hospital Murals, mural removal, restoration and reinstallation. New York, NY
- Illinois State Capitol, mural restoration, ornamental plaster, decorative paint, gilding (2013). Springfield, IL.
- University of Tennessee, restoration of the Greenwood Mural. Knoxville, TN

=== Commercial ===
- 30 Rockefeller Plaza, mural conservation, restoration. New York, NY
- Chrysler Building, mural conservation, restoration. New York, NY
- Plaza Hotel, ornamental plaster, decorative paint, gilding, wood refinishing. New York, NY
- The Sherry Netherland, mural conservation and restoration. New York, NY
- Verizon Building, mural restoration, plaster restoration. New York, NY

=== Sacred ===
- Christ the Light Cathedral, Venetian plaster, decorative finishes. Oakland, CA
- Eldridge Street Synagogue, conservation, restoration, decorative paint. New York, NY
- Grace Church, conservation, stenciling, finishes restoration. Brooklyn, NY
- Blessed Sacrament Cathedral, artistic design, ornamental plaster design, mural design. Greensburg, PA
- Cathedral of the Immaculate Conception, mural restoration, new mural design, ornamental plaster. Wichita, KS
- St. Joseph's Co-Cathedral, mural conservation and new design, ornamental plaster, scagliola, decorative paint. Brooklyn, NY

=== Theaters ===
- Paramount Theatre, historic finishes restoration, decorative paint, mural stenciling. Boston, MA
- Kings Theatre, conservation, ornamental plaster, decorative paint, stone/wood/metal refinishing. Brooklyn, NY
- Fox Theater, conservation, gilding, decorative paint, ornamental plaster. Oakland, CA
- Richard Rodgers Theatre, decorative paint, ornamental plaster, digital wallpaper. New York, NY

== Awards ==
=== Commercial ===
- Empire State Building, mural conservation and restoration. New York, NY

=== Sacred ===
- Basilica of the National Shrine of the Assumption of the Blessed Virgin Mary, decorative paint, ornamental plaster, gilding, exterior stucco restoration. Baltimore, MD
- Church of St. Francis Xavier, ornamental plaster, mural restoration, decorative paint. New York, NY

=== Theaters ===
- Lerner Theatre, historic finish replication, decorative paint. Elkhart, IN
- Bob Hope Theatre, conservation and restoration. Stockton, CA
