= Free Spirits (Mary Lou Williams album) =

Studio album by Mary Lou Williams Trio
- Released: 1976
- Recorded: July 8, 1975
- Studio: C.I. Recording, NY
- Genre: Jazz
- Length: 68:19
- Label: SteepleChase; SCS-1043
- Producer: Nils Winther

Mary Lou Williams chronology
| Zoning (1974) | Free Spirits (1976) | Live at the Cookery (1975) |

Free Spirits is an album by pianist and composer Mary Lou Williams recorded in 1975 and released on the SteepleChase label in 1976.

== Reception ==
Professional ratings
Review scores
| Source | Rating |
|---|---|
| Allmusic | 3/5 stars |
| Penguin Guide to Jazz | 4/4 stars |

Allmusic said it "Includes great trio cuts". The Penguin Guide to Jazz selected this album as part of its suggested Core Collection.

== Track listing ==
1. "Dat Dere" (Bobby Timmons) – 4:48
2. "Baby Man, #2" (John Stubblefield) – 7:56 Bonus track on CD reissue
3. "Baby Man" (Stubblefield) – 8:31
4. "All Blues" (Miles Davis) – 6:59
5. "Temptation" (Nacio Herb Brown, Arthur Freed) – 5:08
6. "Pale Blue" (Buster Williams) – 4:27
7. "Free Spirits #2" (Stubblefield) – 5:04 Bonus track on CD reissue
8. "Free Spirits" (Stubblefield) – 5:25
9. "Blues for Timme" (Mary Lou Williams) – 5:37
10. "Ode to Saint Cecile" (Mary Lou Williams) – 5:55 Bonus track on CD reissue
11. "Surrey with the Fringe on Top" (Richard Rodgers, Oscar Hammerstein II) – 2:58 Bonus track on CD reissue
12. "Gloria" (Mary Lou Williams) – 5:31

== Personnel ==
- Mary Lou Williams – piano
- Buster Williams – bass
- Mickey Roker – drums
