= Ben Thigpen =

American jazz musician

- Born: Benjamin F. Thigpen; November 16, 1908; Laurel, Mississippi
- Died: October 5, 1971 (aged 62) St. Louis, Missouri
- Genres: Jazz
- Occupation: Musician
- Instrument: Drums

Ben Thigpen (November 16, 1908 – October 5, 1971) was an American jazz drummer. He is the father of drummer Ed Thigpen.

He was born Benjamin F. Thigpen in Laurel, Mississippi. Ben Thigpen played piano as a child, having been trained by his sister Eva. He played in South Bend, Indiana with Bobby Boswell in the 1920s, and then moved to Chicago to study under Jimmy Bertrand. While there he played with many noted Chicago bandleaders and performers, including Doc Cheatham. He played with Charlie Elgar's Creole Band during 1927-1929 but did not record with them. Following this he spent time in Cleveland with J. Frank Terry, and then became the drummer for Andy Kirk's Clouds of Joy, where he stayed from 1930 to 1947. Much of his work is available on collections highlighting the piano work of Mary Lou Williams, who also played in this ensemble.

After his time with Kirk, Thigpen's career is poorly documented. He led his own quintet in St. Louis and recorded with Singleton Palmer in the 1960s.
