= St. Francis Xavier Church (Manhattan) =

Catholic parish in New York City

Coordinates: 40°44′18″N 73°59′43″W

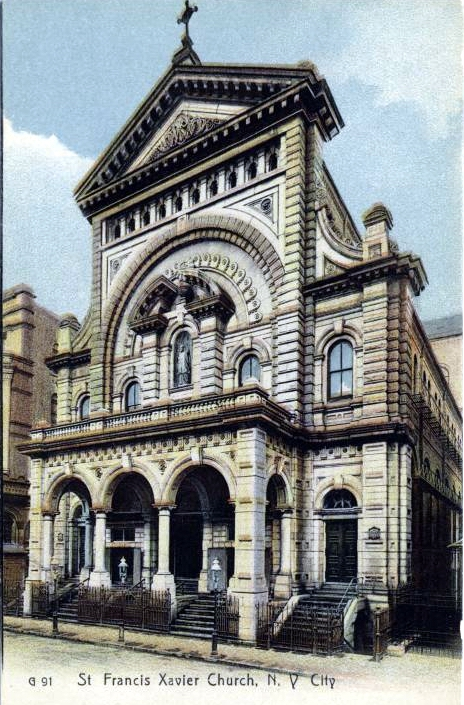
- Interactive map of the St. Francis Xavier Church area

General information
- Location: New York City, United States of America
- Client: Archdiocese of New York

Website
- St. Francis Xavier Church, Manhattan (Flatiron)

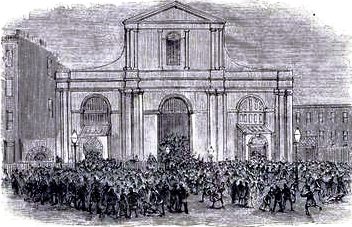
The original church of St. Francis Xavier Church as it was on the evening of March 8, 1877 when it was the scene of a great panic

St. Francis Xavier Church is a Catholic parish at 30–36 West 16th Street, between Fifth Avenue and Avenue of the Americas (Sixth Avenue), in the Flatiron District of Manhattan, New York City. It is administered by the Society of Jesus.

== History ==
The original church parish was founded in 1851 by Jesuits from the village of Fordham. Its original sanctuary, designed by William Rodrigue, was the scene of a panic on March 8, 1877, when someone shouted "Fire!" in the church during Mass; seven people died. This church was torn down in 1878.

=== Second church ===
The cornerstone of the new church parish was laid in May 1878 on land immediately to the west of the old parish building. Built over the next four years, the current parish building has been in use since 1882. Designed by Irish-born architect Patrick Charles Keely in a "Roman Basilica" style, the church has a Neo-baroque exterior with a façade of bluish-gray granite quarried from Monson, Massachusetts, by the W.N. Flynt Granite Co. The main entrance is sheltered by a arcaded portico. The stained-glass windows in a pre-Raphaelite style are by the Morgan brothers, frequent collaborators of Keely. The church was dedicated by Archbishop Michael Corrigan on December 3, 1882.

The jazz artist Mary Lou Williams first performed Black Christ of the Andes, based around a hymn in honor of the Peruvian saint Martin de Porres, and two other short works, Anima Christi and Praise the Lord, in November 1962 at St. Francis Xavier..

A campaign for the extensive restoration and preservation of St. Francis Xavier Church began in 2001 and was completed in 2010 under the direction of EverGreene Architectural Arts and Thomas A. Fenniman, architect.

== See also ==
- Xavier High School (New York City)
