= Reuben Phillips (musician) =

- Born: Providence, Kentucky, United States
- Died: February 13, 1974 San Juan, Puerto Rico
- Genres: Jazz; Big band
- Occupations: Saxophonist, arranger, bandleader
- Instrument: Alto saxophone

Reuben Phillips (died February 13, 1974, in San Juan, Puerto Rico) was an American jazz saxophonist, arranger and bandleader, born in Providence, Kentucky.

After five years as an alto saxophonist with Andy Kirk and his Clouds of Joy, he played with Willis Jackson (1950) then Josephine Baker and Louis Jordan (1951). From 1952, Phillips has been a freelance arranger, musician and band leader in the New York area. He made arrangements for Dinah Washington, Lavern Baker, Ruth Brown, Billy Ward, Earl Bostic, Arnett Cobb among others.

He also played and recorded with Gene Redd, Sammy Lowe, George Rhodes, Dud Bascomb, and later recorded with Willis Jackson (1970) and Erskine Hawkins (1971).

He recorded two albums with his own big band, the house band at the Apollo Theatre on 125th Street in Harlem in the 1960s and 70s.

He died in San Juan of an apparent heart attack at the age of 53.

== Discography ==
As a leader

- 1960: Manhattan...3:00 a.m. (Poplar 1003)
- 1961: Big band at the Apollo (Ascot 16004)

As a sideman

- Andy Kirk, Live at the Apollo, 1944–47
- Louis Jordan And his orchestra, 1951
- George Rhodes, Plays Porgy and Bess, 1958
- Willis Jackson, Recording session, 1970
- Erskine Hawkins, Live at Club Soul Sound, 1971
