= Andy Kirk (musician) =

American jazz bandleader and saxophonist (1898–1992)

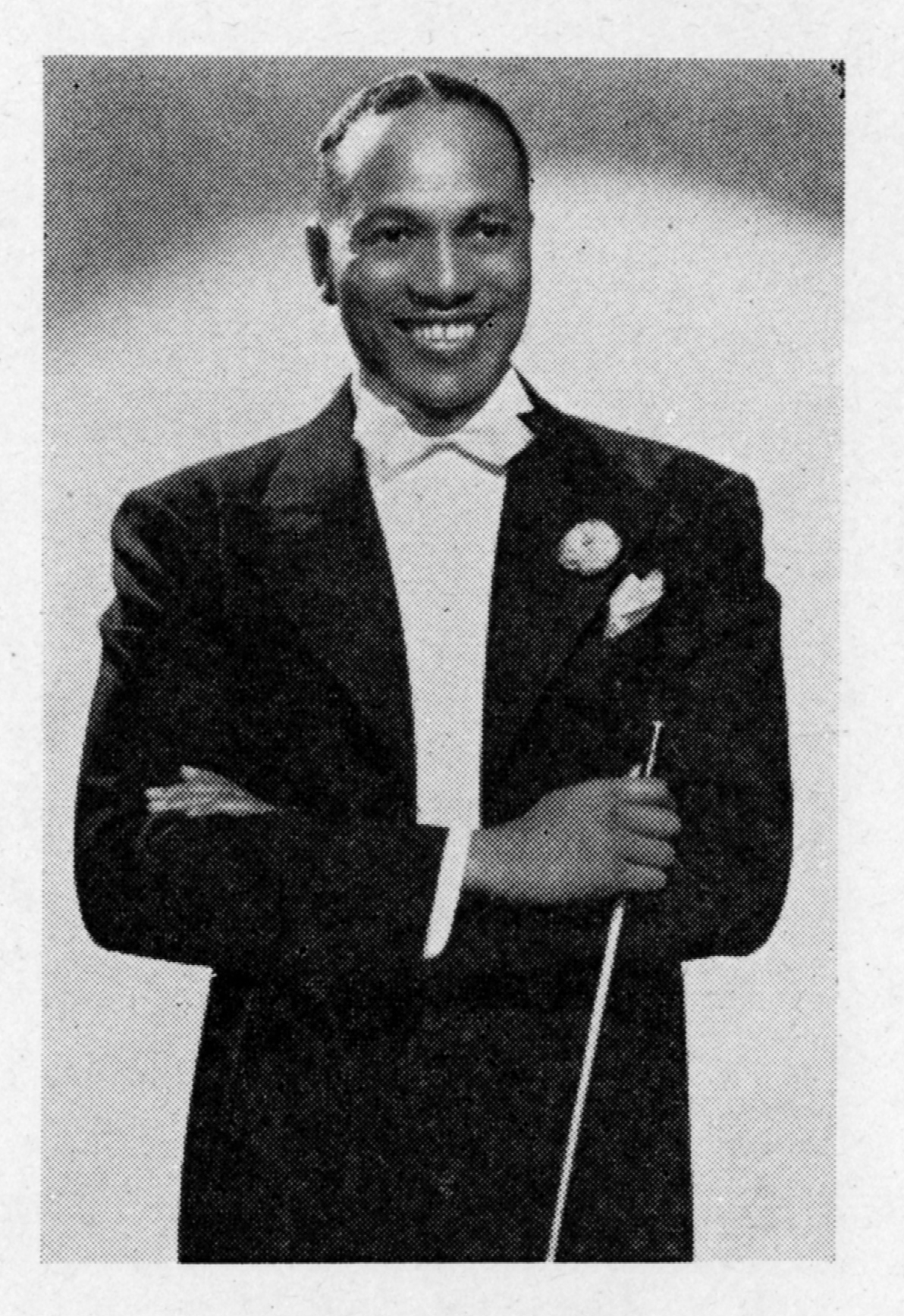

Background information
- Born: Andrew Dewey Kirk; May 28, 1898; Newport, Kentucky, U.S.
- Died: December 11, 1992 (aged 94) New York City, New York, U.S.
- Genre: Jazz
- Occupations: Band leader and saxophonist
- Labels: Brunswick, Decca

Andrew Dewey Kirk (May 28, 1898 – December 11, 1992) was an American jazz bandleader and saxophonist who led the Twelve Clouds of Joy, a band popular during the swing era.

== Life and career ==
He was born in Newport, Kentucky, United States. Kirk grew up in Denver, Colorado, where he was tutored by Wilberforce Whiteman, Paul Whiteman's father. Kirk started his musical career playing with George Morrison's band, but then went on to join Terrence Holder's Dark Clouds of Joy. In 1929, he was elected leader after Holder departed.

Renaming the band Clouds of Joy, Kirk also relocated the band from Dallas, Texas, to Kansas City, Missouri. Although named the Clouds of Joy, the band has also been known as the Twelve Clouds of Joy due to the number of musicians in the band. They set up in the Pla-Mor Ballroom on the junction of 32nd Street and Main Street in Kansas City and made their first recording for Brunswick Records that same year. Mary Lou Williams came in as pianist at the last moment, but she impressed Brunswick's Dave Kapp, so she became a member of the band.

After their first recordings in 1929–1930, they grew popular as they epitomized the Kansas City jazz sound. In mid-1936, he was signed to Decca and made scores of popular records until 1946. He presumably disbanded and reformed his band during that six-year recording layoff, as his 1929–1930 Brunswick appeared to have sold well enough to stay in the catalog through the period and 1933-34 pressings (with the mid-1930s label variations) have been seen.

In 1938, Kirk and band held the top spot of the Your Hit Parade chart for 12 weeks with "I Won't Tell a Soul (I Love You)", written by Hughie Charles and Ross Parker, featuring Pha Terrell on vocals. In 1942, Kirk and His Clouds of Joy recorded "Take It and Git", which on October 24, 1942, became the first single to hit number one on the Harlem Hit Parade, the predecessor to the Billboard R&B chart. In 1943, with June Richmond on vocals, he had a number 4 hit with "Hey Lawdy Mama".

== Clouds of Joy ==
The band at various times included Buddy Tate (tenor saxophone), Claude Williams (violin), Pha Terrell (vocals), Mary Lou's then husband, John Williams, Bill Coleman, Ken Kersey, Dick Wilson, Don Byas, "Shorty" Baker, Howard McGhee, Jimmy Forrest, Ben Smith, Fats Navarro, Charlie Parker (briefly), Reuben Phillips, Ben Thigpen, Henry Wells, Milt Robinson, Floyd Smith, Hank Jones, Johnny Lynch, Joe Williams, Big Jim Lawson, Gino Murray and Joe Evans.

Their pianist, and the band's arranger, was Mary Lou Williams, who went on to become a prominent figure in jazz.

In 1948, Kirk disbanded the Clouds of Joy and continued to work as a musician, but eventually switched to hotel management and real estate. He also served as an official in the Musicians' Union.

== Death ==
He died of Alzheimer's disease in New York at the age of 94.

== Discography ==
He recorded with Brunswick from 1930 to 1931, with Decca from 1936 to 1945, Coral in 1950. The Chronological Classics contains almost everything Kirk recorded, are exlcuded alternate takes, live recordings, broadcasts.

- 1929–31 - The Chronological 1929–1931 (Classics 655, 1992)
- 1936–37 - The Chronological 1936–1937 (Classics 573, 1991)
- 1937–38 - The Chronological 1937–1938 (Classics 581, 1991)
- 1938–00 - The Chronological 1938 (Classics 598, 1991)
- 1939–40 - The Chronological 1939–1940 (Classics 640, 1992)
- 1940–42 - The Chronological 1940–1942 (Classics 681, 1993)
- 1943–49 - The Chronological 1943–1949 (Classics 1075, 2000)
- 193? - Twelve Clouds Of Joy (Ace Of Hearts 160 [LP], 1967)
- 1929–30 - Cloudy (Hep 1002 [LP], 1984)
- 1930 - Clouds Of Joy (Ace Of Hearts 105 [LP], 1966)
- 1930–31 - All Out For Hicksville (recorded ) (Hep 1007 [LP], 1985)
- 1936 - Andy Kirk & His 12 Clouds Of Joy: March 1936 (Mainstream 399 [LP], 1973)
- 1936-38 - The Lady Who Swings The Band [Andy Kirk & His Clouds Of Joy 2/Jazz Heritage Series 70] (MCA France 510121 [LP], 1975; reissue: MCA 1343 [LP], 1982)
- 1936-40 - Kansas City Bounce 1936–1940 (Black & Blue 59.240, 1991)
- 1936–41 - Walkin' & Swingin' (Affinity 1011 [LP], 1983)
- 1936–41 - Andy Kirk & Mary Lou Williams: Mary's Idea (GRP 622, 1993)
- 1936–41 - Andy Kirk And His Clouds Of Joy: Souvenir Album, Vol. 1 (Coral 56019 [10" LP], 1951)
- 1936–1942 - Instrumentally Speaking [Andy Kirk & His Clouds Of Joy 1/Jazz Heritage Series 16] (Decca 79232 [LP], 1968; MCA France 510033 [LP] 197?; reissue: MCA 1308 [LP], 1980)
- 1938–1942 - Clouds At Sundown [Andy Kirk & His Clouds Of Joy 3/Jazz Heritage Series 74] (MCA France 510133 [LP], 1975)
- 1944 - The Uncollected Andy Kirk And The Clouds Of Joy: 1944 (Hindsight 227 [LP], 1986)
- 1956 - A Mellow Bit Of Rhythm (RCA Victor 1302, 1956) reissued as Clouds From The Southwest RCA France 42418 [LP], 1979) re-recording of 12 of his hits

=== Anthologies ===
- 1929–1940 - Andy Kirk: The 12 Clouds Of Joy With Mary Lou Williams (ASV Living Era 5108, 1993)
- 1936–54 - The Best Of Andy Kirk MCA 4105 [2-LP set], 1976)
- 1929–1946 - An Introduction To Andy Kirk: His Best Recordings (Best Of Jazz 4053, 1996)
- 1936–49 - Jukebox Hits 1936–1949 (Acrobat 4077, 2005)

== See also ==
- Kansas City Jazz
- Mary Lou Williams
