= Pha Terrell =

American jazz singer (1910–1945)

- Born: May 25, 1910; Kansas City, Missouri, U.S.
- Died: October 14, 1945 (aged 35) Los Angeles, U.S.
- Genres: Jazz
- Occupation: Musician (vocalist)

Pha Elmer Terrell (May 25, 1910 in Kansas City, Missouri – October 14, 1945 in Los Angeles) was an American jazz singer.

Terrell was working in nightclubs locally in Kansas City in the early 1930s as a singer, dancer, and emcee when he was discovered by Andy Kirk, who hired him to be the vocalist for his group the Twelve Clouds of Joy. Terrell sang with Kirk for eight years, from 1933 to 1941, and recorded with him extensively for Decca Records, singing hits such as 1936's "Until the Real Thing Comes Along" and 1938's "I Won't Tell a Soul (I Love You)".

After 1941 Terrell moved to Indianapolis to play with Clarence Love's territory band, then moved to Los Angeles, where he worked as a soloist. Terrell died of kidney failure in 1945.
