= Mary Lou Williams =

American jazz pianist and composer (1910–1981)

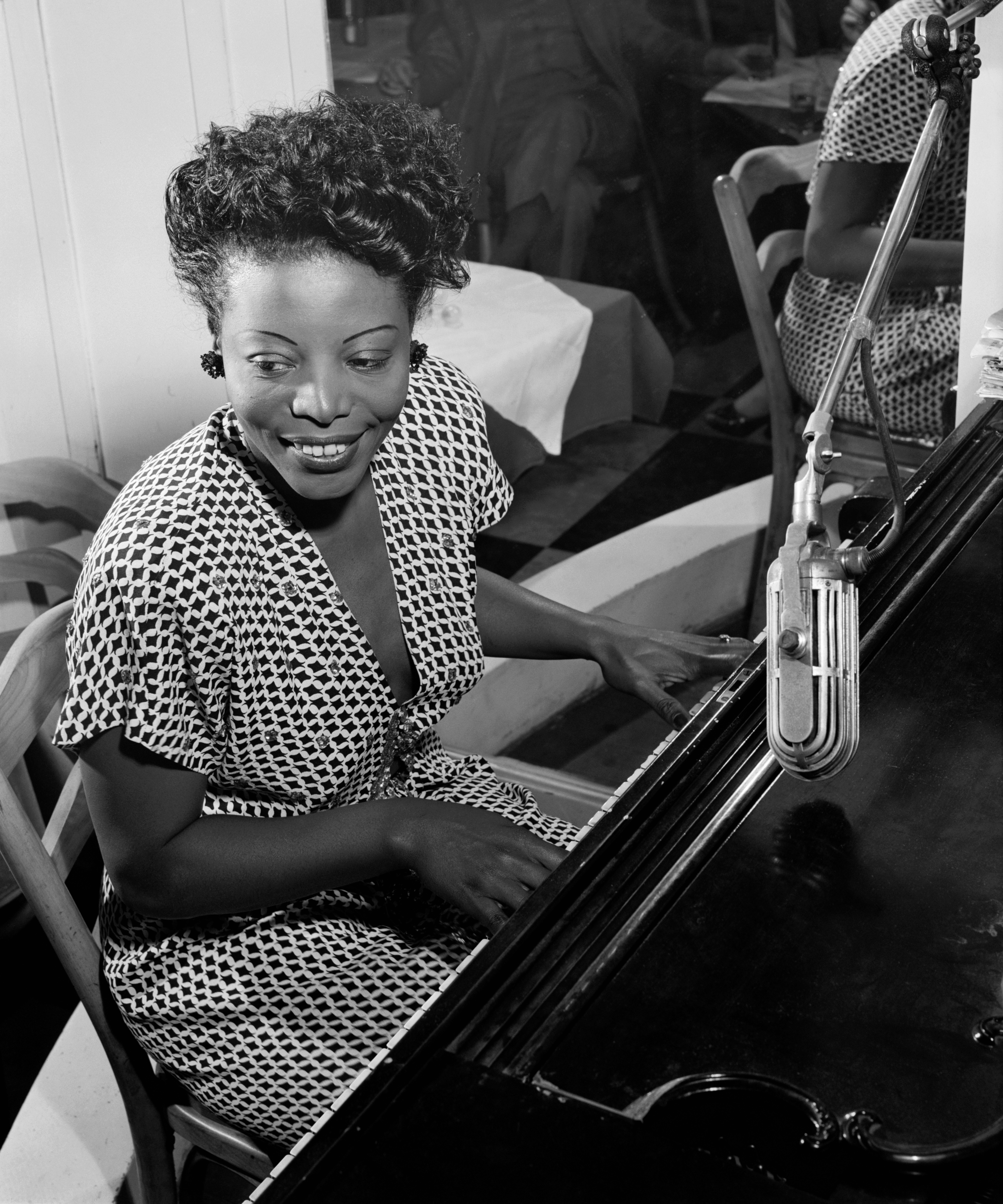
- Williams c. 1946; by William P. Gottlieb

Background information
- Born: Mary Elfrieda Scruggs; May 8, 1910; Atlanta, Georgia, U.S.
- Died: May 28, 1981 (aged 71) Durham, North Carolina, U.S.
- Genres: Jazz; swing; bebop; gospel; third stream
- Occupations: Musician; composer; arranger; bandleader
- Instrument: Piano
- Years active: 1920–1981
- Labels: Brunswick; Decca; Columbia; Savoy; Asch; Folkways; Victor; King; Atlantic; Circle; Vogue; Prestige; Chiaroscuro; SteepleChase; Pablo
- Spouse: John Overton Williams (m. 1927; div. 1940) Shorty Baker (m. 1942; sep. 1944)
- Burial place: Calvary Catholic Cemetery

Mary Lou Williams (born Mary Elfrieda Scruggs; May 8, 1910 – May 28, 1981) was an American jazz pianist, arranger, and composer. She wrote hundreds of compositions and arrangements and recorded more than one hundred records (in 78 rpm, 45 rpm, and LP versions). Williams wrote and arranged for Duke Ellington and Benny Goodman, and she was a friend, mentor, and teacher to Thelonious Monk, Charlie Parker, Miles Davis, Tadd Dameron, Bud Powell, and Dizzy Gillespie.

She has been noted for her 1954 conversion to Catholicism, which led to a musical hiatus and a later transformation in the nature of her music. She continued to perform and work as a philanthropist, educator, and youth mentor until her death from bladder cancer in 1981.

== Early years ==
The second of eleven children, Williams was born in Atlanta, Georgia, and grew up in the East Liberty neighborhood of Pittsburgh, Pennsylvania. A child prodigy, at the age of two she was able to pick out simple tunes, and by the age of three, she was taught piano by her mother. Williams played piano out of necessity at a very young age; her white neighbors were throwing bricks into her house until Williams began playing the piano in their homes. At the age of six, she supported her ten half-brothers and sisters by playing at parties. She began performing publicly at the age of seven when she became known admiringly in Pittsburgh as "The Little Piano Girl". She became a professional musician at the age of 15, citing Lovie Austin as her greatest influence. She married jazz saxophonist John Overton Williams in November 1926.

== Career ==
In 1922, at the age of 12, Williams went on the Orpheum Circuit of theaters. During the following year, she played with Duke Ellington and his early small band, the Washingtonians. One morning at three o'clock, she was playing with McKinney's Cotton Pickers at Harlem's Rhythm Club. Louis Armstrong entered the room and paused to listen to her.

In 1927, Williams married the saxophonist John Overton Williams. She met him at a performance in Cleveland where he was leading his group, the Syncopators, and moved with him to Memphis, Tennessee. He assembled a band in Memphis, which included Williams on piano. In 1929, the 19-year-old Williams assumed leadership of the Memphis band when her husband accepted an invitation to join Andy Kirk's band in Oklahoma City. Williams joined her husband in Oklahoma City but did not play with the band. The group, Andy Kirk's Twelve Clouds of Joy, moved to Tulsa, Oklahoma, where Williams, when she wasn't working as a musician, was employed transporting bodies for an undertaker. When the Clouds of Joy accepted a longstanding engagement in Kansas City, Missouri, Williams joined her husband and began sitting in with the band, as well as serving as its arranger and composer. She provided Kirk with such songs as "Froggy Bottom", "Walkin' and Swingin'", "Little Joe from Chicago", "Roll 'Em", and "Mary's Idea".

Williams was the arranger and pianist for recordings in Kansas City (1929) Chicago (1930), and New York City (1930). During a trip to Chicago, she recorded "Drag 'Em" and "Night Life" as piano solos. She used the name "Mary Lou" at the suggestion of Jack Kapp at Brunswick Records. The records sold quickly, raising Williams to national prominence. Soon after the recording session, she became Kirk's permanent second pianist, playing solo gigs and working as a freelance arranger for Earl Hines, Benny Goodman, and Tommy Dorsey. In 1937, she produced In the Groove (Brunswick), a collaboration with Dick Wilson, and Goodman asked her to write a blues song for his band. The result was "Roll 'Em", a boogie-woogie piece based on the blues, which followed her successful "Camel Hop", named for Goodman's radio show sponsor, Camel cigarettes. Goodman tried to put Williams under contract to write for him exclusively, but she refused, preferring to freelance instead.

In 1942, Williams, who had divorced her husband, left the Twelve Clouds of Joy and returned again to Pittsburgh. She was joined there by bandmate Harold "Shorty" Baker, with whom she formed a six-piece ensemble which included Art Blakey on drums. After an engagement in Cleveland, Baker left to join Duke Ellington's orchestra. Williams joined the band in New York City, then traveled to Baltimore, where she and Baker were married. She traveled with Ellington and arranged several tunes for him, including "Trumpet No End" (1946), her version of Irving Berlin's "Blue Skies". She also sold Ellington on performing "Walkin' and Swingin'". Within a year, she had left Baker and the group and returned to New York.

Williams in her apartment with Jack Teagarden, Tadd Dameron, Hank Jones, and Dizzy Gillespie, 1947; by William P. Gottlieb

Williams accepted a job at the Café Society Downtown, started a weekly radio show called Mary Lou Williams's Piano Workshop on WNEW, and began mentoring and collaborating with younger bebop musicians such as Dizzy Gillespie and Thelonious Monk. In 1945, she composed the bebop hit "In the Land of Oo-Bla-Dee" for Gillespie. "During this period Monk and the kids would come to my apartment every morning around four or pick me up at the Café after I'd finished my last show, and we'd play and swap ideas until noon or later", Williams recalled in Melody Maker.

In 1945, Williams composed the classically-influenced Zodiac Suite, in which each of the twelve parts corresponded to a sign of the zodiac, and were accordingly dedicated to several of her musical colleagues, including Billie Holiday and Art Tatum. She recorded the suite with Jack Parker and Al Lucas and performed it December 31, 1945, at the Town Hall in New York City with an orchestra and the tenor saxophonist Ben Webster.

In 1952, Williams accepted an offer to perform in England and ended up staying in Europe for two years. By this time, her musical career had left Williams mentally and physically drained.

=== Conversion to Catholicism and hiatus ===
A three-year hiatus from performing began when she suddenly backed away from the piano during a performance in Paris in 1954. She returned to the United States, converting to Catholicism in 1954 alongside Dizzy Gillespie's wife, Lorraine. In addition to spending several hours at Mass, her energies were then devoted mainly to the Bel Canto Foundation, an effort she initiated using her savings as well as help from friends to turn her apartment in Hamilton Heights into a halfway house for the poor as well as musicians who were grappling with addiction; she also made money over a longer period of time for the halfway house by way of a thrift store in Harlem.

Her hiatus may have been triggered by the death of her long-time friend and student Charlie Parker in 1955 who also struggled with addiction for the majority of his life. Father John Crowley and Father Anthony aided in persuading Williams to return to playing music. They told her that she could continue to serve God and the Catholic Church by utilizing her exceptional gift of creating music. Moreover, Dizzy Gillespie convinced her to return to playing, which she did at the 1957 Newport Jazz Festival with his band.

In 1958, she appeared as one of only three women in the famous photograph of jazz greats, A Great Day in Harlem.

Father Peter O'Brien, a Catholic priest, became her close friend and manager in the 1960s. Gillespie also introduced her to Pittsburgh's Bishop John Wright. O'Brien helped her establish new venues for jazz performance at a time when no more than two clubs in Manhattan offered jazz full-time. In addition to club work, she played at colleges, formed her own record label and publishing companies, founded the Pittsburgh Jazz Festival (with the bishop's help), and made television appearances.

Bishop Wright let her teach at Seton High School on the city's North Side. It was there that she wrote her first Mass, called The Pittsburgh Mass. Williams eventually became the first jazz composer commissioned by the church to compose liturgical music in the jazz idiom.

=== Return to music ===
Following her hiatus, Williams's wrote and performed Black Christ of the Andes, based on a hymn in honor of the Peruvian saint Martin de Porres, and two other short works, Anima Christi and Praise the Lord. It was first performed in November 1962 at St. Francis Xavier Church in Manhattan. She recorded it in October of the next year.

Throughout the 1960s, Williams's composing concentrated on sacred music, hymns, and masses. One of the masses, Music for Peace, was choreographed by Alvin Ailey and performed by the Alvin Ailey Dance Theater as Mary Lou's Mass in 1971. About the work, Ailey commented, "If there can be a Bernstein Mass, a Mozart Mass, a Bach Mass, why can't there be Mary Lou's Mass?" Williams performed the revision of Mary Lou's Mass, her most acclaimed work, on The Dick Cavett Show in 1971. She also made a guest appearance on Sesame Street in 1975.

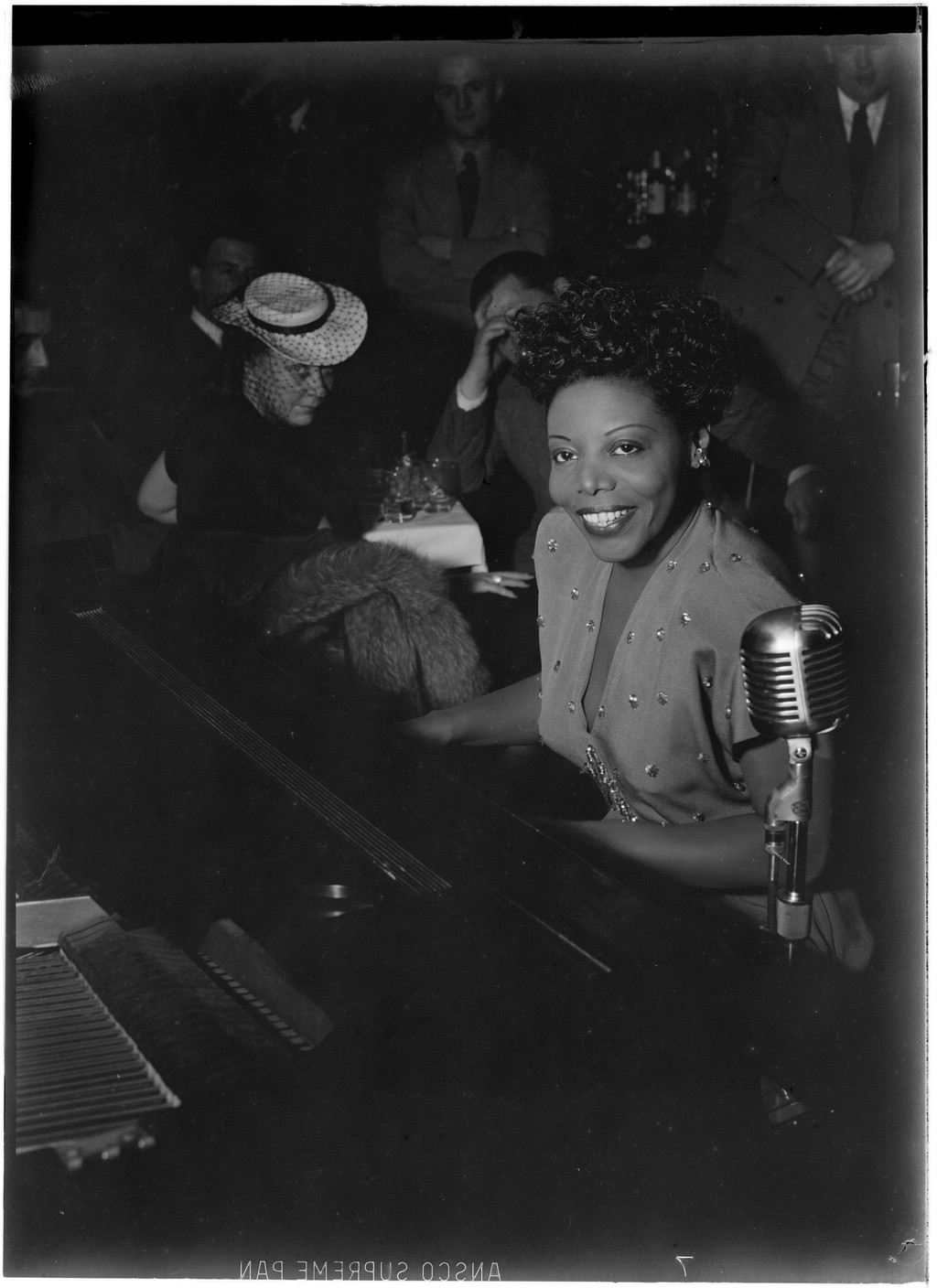
Williams performing at Café Society Downtown, New York City, 1947; by William P. Gottlieb

Williams put much effort into working with youth choirs to perform her works, including Mary Lou's Mass at St. Patrick's Cathedral in New York City in April 1975 before a gathering of over three thousand. It marked the first time a jazz musician had played at the church. She opened a charitable organization and opened thrift stores in Harlem, directing the proceeds, along with ten percent of her own earnings, to musicians in need. As a 1964 Time article explained, "Mary Lou thinks of herself as a 'soul' player – a way of saying that she never strays far from melody and the blues, but deals sparingly in gospel harmony and rhythm. 'I am praying through my fingers when I play,' she says. 'I get that good 'soul sound', and I try to touch people's spirits.'" She performed at the Monterey Jazz Festival in 1965 with a jazz festival group.

Throughout the 1970s, Williams's career flourished. She released numerous albums, including as solo pianist and commentator on the recorded The History of Jazz. She returned to the Monterey Jazz Festival in 1971. She could also be seen playing nightly in Greenwich Village at the Cookery, a new club run by her former boss from the Café Society, Barney Josephson. That engagement too, was recorded.

Williams had a two-piano performance with the avant-garde pianist Cecil Taylor at Carnegie Hall on April 17, 1977. Despite onstage tensions between Williams and Taylor, their performance was released on a live album titled Embraced.

Williams instructed school children on jazz. She then accepted an appointment at Duke University as artist-in-residence (from 1977 to 1981), teaching the History of Jazz with Father O'Brien and directing the Duke Jazz Ensemble. With a light teaching schedule, she also made many concert and festival appearances, conducted clinics with youth, and, in 1978, performed at the White House for President Jimmy Carter and his guests. She participated in Benny Goodman's 40th-anniversary Carnegie Hall concert in 1978.

== Later years ==
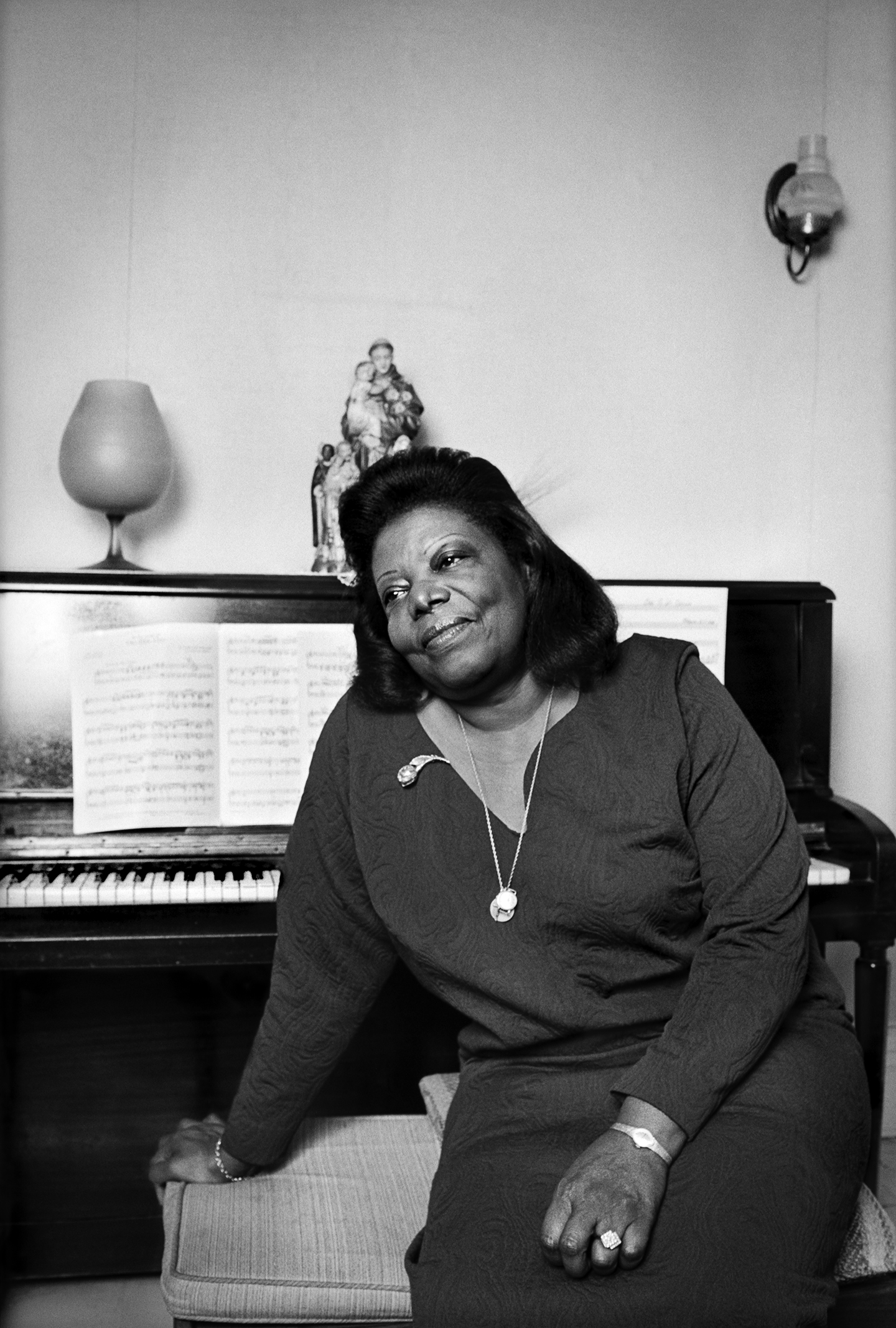
Williams photographed in 1978 by Lynn Gilbert

Williams's final recording, Solo Recital (Montreux Jazz Festival, 1978), three years before her death, had a medley encompassing spirituals, ragtime, blues, and swing. Other highlights include Williams's reworkings of "Tea for Two", "Honeysuckle Rose", and her two compositions "Little Joe from Chicago", and "What's Your Story Morning Glory". Other tracks include "Medley: The Lord Is Heavy", "Old Fashion Blues", "Over the Rainbow", "Offertory Meditation", "Concerto Alone at Montreux", and "The Man I Love".

In 1980, she founded the Mary Lou Williams Foundation.

In 1981, Williams died of bladder cancer in Durham, North Carolina, at the age of 71. Dizzy Gillespie, Benny Goodman, and Andy Kirk attended her funeral at the Church of St. Ignatius Loyola. She was buried in the Calvary Catholic Cemetery in Pittsburgh. Looking back at the end of her life, Williams said, "I did it, didn't I? Through muck and mud." As one of the first women to be successful in jazz, she was known as "the first lady of the jazz keyboard".

Her final work for wind symphony, History..., reconstructed and recomposed by the Duke University faculty member Anthony Kelley, premiered in 2024.

== Awards and honors ==
- 1971: Grammy Award nomination in "Best Jazz Performance – Group" for the album Giants with Dizzy Gillespie and Bobby Hackett
- 1972 and 1977: Guggenheim Fellowships
- 1973: Honorary degree from Fordham University, New York City
- 1980: Honorary degree from Rockhurst College, Kansas City, Missouri
- 1981: Duke University Trinity Award for service to the university, an award voted on by Duke University students

== Legacy ==
- In 1983, Duke University established the Mary Lou Williams Center for Black Culture
- Since 1996, The Kennedy Center in Washington, D.C., has held an annual Mary Lou Williams Women in Jazz Festival.
- Since 2000, Williams's archives are preserved at Rutgers University's Institute of Jazz Studies in Newark, New Jersey.
- A Pennsylvania State Historic Marker is placed at 328 Lincoln Avenue, Lincoln Elementary School, Pittsburgh, noting her accomplishments and the location of the school she attended.
- In 2000, the trumpeter Dave Douglas released the album Soul on Soul as a tribute to her, featuring original arrangements of her music and new pieces inspired by her work.
- The 2000 album Impressions of Mary Lou by the pianist John Hicks features eight of her compositions.
- The Dutch Jazz Orchestra researched and played rediscovered works of Williams on their 2005 album Lady Who Swings the Band.
- In 2006, Geri Allen's Mary Lou Williams Collective released their album Zodiac Suite: Revisited.
- A young adult historical novel based on Mary Lou Williams and her early life entitled Jazz Girl, by Sarah Bruce Kelly, was published in 2010.
- A children's book based on Mary Lou Williams entitled The Little Piano Girl, by Ann Ingalls and Maryann MacDonald with illustrations by Giselle Potter, was published in 2010.
- A poetry book by Yona Harvey entitled Hemming the Water was published in 2013, inspired by Williams and features the poem "Communion with Mary Lou Williams".
- In 2013, the American Musicological Society published Selected Works for Big Band, a compilation of 11 of Williams's big band scores.
- In 2015, an award-winning documentary film entitled, Mary Lou Williams: The Lady Who Swings the Band, produced and directed by Carol Bash, premiered on American Public Television and was screened at various domestic and international film festivals.
- In 2018, the What'sHerName women's history podcast aired the episode "The Musician Mary Lou Williams", with Carol Bash, a guest expert and producer/director of Mary Lou Williams: The Lady Who Swings the Band.
- In 2021, the Umlaut Big Band released Mary's Ideas (Umlaut Records), a double-CD featuring rare and newly discovered works by Williams based on research from her manuscripts. It includes arrangements and compositions meant for Duke Ellington and Benny Goodman, excerpts from the Zodiac Suite in its 1945 orchestral arrangement, and excerpts from History of Jazz for Wind Symphony, Williams's ultimate and unfinished composition.
- Mary Lou Williams Lane, a street near 10th and Paseo in Kansas City, Missouri

== Discography ==
=== As leader ===
| Year recorded | Title | Label |
|---|---|---|
| 1945 | The Zodiac Suite | Asch |
| 1945 | Town Hall '45: The Zodiac Suite | Vintage Jazz Classics, 1993 |
| 1951 | Mary Lou Williams | Atlantic |
| 1953 | The First Lady of the Piano | Vogue |
| 1953 | A Keyboard History | Jazztone |
| 1954 | Mary Lou | EmArcy |
| 1959 | Messin' 'Round in Montmartre | Storyville |
| 1964 | Mary Lou Williams / Black Christ of the Andes | Mary/Folkways |
| 1970 | Music for Peace | Mary |
| 1975 | Mary Lou's Mass | Mary |
| 1970 | From the Heart | Chiaroscuro |
| 1974 | Zoning | Mary/Folkways |
| 1975 | Free Spirits | SteepleChase |
| 1976 | Live at the Cookery | Chiaroscuro, 1994 |
| 1977 | Embraced with Cecil Taylor | Pablo Live |
| 1977 | My Mama Pinned a Rose on Me | Pablo, 1978 |
| 1977 | Live at the Keystone Korner | HighNote, 2002 |
| 1977 | A Grand Night For Swinging | HighNote, 2008 |
| 1978 | Solo Recital | Pablo |
| 1978 | Marian McPartland's Piano Jazz with Guest Mary Lou Williams | Jazz Alliance, 2004 |
| 1978 | Nice Jazz 1978 | Black & Blue, 2016 |
| 1979 | At Rick's Café Americain | Storyville, 1999 |

=== As featured artist ===
With Dizzy Gillespie

- Dizzy Gillespie at Newport (Verve, 1957)
- Giants (Perception, 1971) – with Bobby Hackett

With Buddy Tate

- Buddy Tate and His Buddies (Chiaroscuro, 1973)

== See also ==
- List of people from Harlem
