= 1929–1933 =

Compilation album by Henry "Red" Allen and His Orchestra
- Released: 1990
- Recorded: July 16, 1929 – November 9, 1933
- Genre: Jazz
- Length: 70:40
- Label: Chronological Classics

Henry "Red" Allen and His Orchestra chronology
Original 1933–1941 Recordings (1989)	1929–1933 (1990)	1935–1936 (1991)

1929–1933 is a 1990 compilation album featuring material recorded by Henry "Red" Allen and his orchestra between 1929 and 1933. The first of five CDs released by Chronological Classics, the album is considered part of the "core collection" by the Penguin Guide to Jazz. Allen and Coleman Hawkins shared leadership of the band.

== Critical reception ==
Professional ratings
Review scores
Source	Rating
AllMusic	4.5/5 stars
The Penguin Guide to Jazz Recordings	4/4 stars

The album has been critically well received. Scott Yanow, writing for AllMusic, described it as "one of the best" of the series, with "many memorable sections." The authors of The Penguin Guide to Jazz list the album as part of their "core collection".

== Track listing ==
All songs composed by Red Allen, except as otherwise noted.

1. "It Should Be You" – 3:10
2. "Biff'ly Blues" – 3:26
3. "Feeling Drowsy" – 3:36
4. "Swing Out" (Allen, J. C. Higginbotham) – 3:17
5. "Make a Country Bird Fly Wild" (Allen, Paul Barbarin) – 3:26
6. "Funny Feathers" (Victoria Spivey) – 2:58
7. "How Do They Do It That Way?" (Spivey) – 3:19
8. "Pleasin' Paul" (Allen, Barbarin) – 2:54
9. "Sugar Hill Function" (Charlie Holmes) – 3:03
10. "You Might Get Better, but You'll Never Get Well" (Louis Metcalf, Luis Russell) – 3:07
11. "Everybody Shout" (Barbarin, Russell) – 2:27
12. "Dancing Dave" (Allen, Barbarin) – 3:11
13. "Roamin' Smith" – 3:39
14. "Singing Pretty Songs" (Allen, Barbarin, Russell) – 3:19
15. "Patrol Wagon Blues" (Porter Grainger) – 3:22
16. "I Fell in Love with You" – 3:30
17. "Someday, Sweetheart" (Benjamin Franklin Spikes, John Spikes) – 2:57
18. "I Wish I Could Shimmy Like My Sister Kate" (Armand Piron) – 2:44
19. "The River's Takin' Care of Me" (Stanley Adams, Jesse Greer) – 2:40
20. "Ain'tcha Got Music?" (James P. Johnson, Andy Razaf) – 2:48
21. "Stringin' Along on a Shoe String" (Harold Adamson, Burton Lane) – 2:47
22. "Shadows on the Swanee" (Johnny Burke, Harold Spina, Joe Young) – 2:44
23. "Hush My Mouth (If I Ain't Goin' South)" (Michael Cleary, Al Hoffman, Maurice Sigler) – 3:01

== Personnel ==
- Bernard Addison – banjo, guitar
- Henry "Red" Allen – trumpet, vocals
- Henry Allen & His New York Orchestra
- Jimmy Archey – trombone
- Paul Barbarin – drums, vibraphone
- William Thornton Blue – clarinet, alto saxophone
- Oliver Childs – bass, bass vocal
- Pops Foster – bass, string bass
- Four Wanderers – vocals
- Coleman Hawkins – tenor saxophone
- Horace Henderson – piano
- J. C. Higginbotham – trombone
- Ernest "Bass" Hill – brass bass
- Teddy Hill – baritone vocals, clarinet, tenor saxophone, baritone saxophone
- Charlie Holmes – clarinet, alto saxophone, soprano saxophone
- Herman Hughes – tenor saxophone, tenor vocals
- Edward Inge – clarinet, alto saxophone
- Hilton Jefferson – alto saxophone
- Maceo Johnson – baritone vocal, baritone saxophone, vocals
- Manzie Johnson – drums
- Otis Johnson – trumpet
- Walter Johnson – drums
- Will Johnson – banjo, guitar, vocals
- John Kirby – brass bass, baritone saxophone, string bass
- Don Kirkpatrick – piano
- Benny Morton – trombone
- Albert Nicholas – clarinet, alto saxophone
- Russell Procope – clarinet, alto saxophone
- Luis Russell – piano, celeste
- Anatol Schenker – liner notes
- Victoria Spivey – vocals
- Greely Walton – tenor saxophone
- Dicky Wells – trombone
- Bob Ysaguirre – brass bass, baritone saxophone, string bass, tuba
