= Stafford Simon =

American jazz musician

Stafford Simon (1908–1960) was an American jazz saxophonist. His nickname was "Pazuza".

== Life and career ==
Simon was born in New York City. He played with Willie Bryant and Leon Gross in the late 1930s, and shortly before World War II played with Benny Carter, Louis Jordan, Fred Rich, and Ollie Shepard. From 1941 to 1943 he played with Lucky Millinder's band, then played with his own ensemble as well as with George James. After the war, he worked with Clyde Bernhardt, the Brooklyn Buddies, and Rex Stewart. Through the 1950s, he worked with his own ensemble, playing in New York City, and in 1960, he died onstage while his ensemble was performing at the Savannah Club.

In 1960 he died leading his band on-stage at the Savannah Club, a venue in Greenwich Village, New York City.
