= Shelton Hemphill =

American jazz trumpeter (1906–1960)

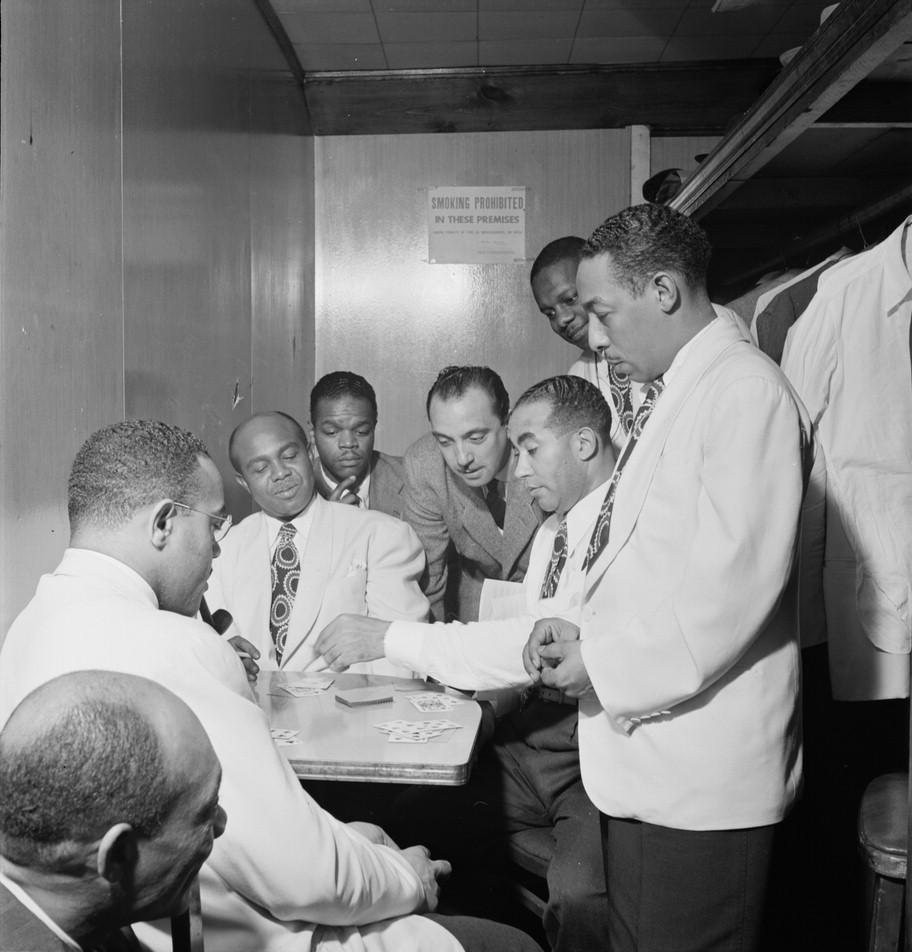
- Al Sears, Shelton Hemphill, Junior Raglin, Django Reinhardt, Lawrence Brown, Harry Carney, Johnny Hodges at the Aquarium Jazz Club on 52nd Street in Manhattan, ca. November 1946

Background information
- Born: Shelton Hemphill; March 16, 1906; Birmingham, Alabama, US
- Died: January 6, 1960 (aged 53) New York City, New York, US
- Genres: Orchestral jazz, swing, big band
- Occupations: Jazz trumpeter
- Instruments: Trumpet
- Years active: 1924–late 1950s

Shelton "Scad" Hemphill (March 16, 1906 – January 6, 1960) was an American jazz trumpeter whose career lasted from the mid-1920s through the late 1950s.

Born in Birmingham, Alabama, Hemphill was still in his teens when he played in the band of Fred Longshaw, which accompanied Bessie Smith on recordings in 1924–25. Also in 1924, at age 18, he enrolled at Wilberforce University in Ohio, and was a member of Horace Henderson's student band alongside Ted and Castor McCord. He moved to New York City late in the 1920s, where he played with Benny Carter and Chick Webb before joining the Mills Blue Rhythm Band, playing with this group from 1931 to 1937. He was in Louis Armstrong's band from 1937 to 1944 and Duke Ellington's from 1944 to 1949. In the 1950s, he played occasionally in New York City but left music due to mounting health problems later in the decade.

Hemphill died in New York City at age 53. His demise, along with that of blues singer Gladys Bentley, who died twelve days later, was noted in the syndicated column of music critic Ralph J. Gleason.

He is the father of Barry Shelton Hemphill, who spent a career as a vocal artist in the US Army Chorus, retiring at the rank of E-9. Barry Hemphill was also the artistic director of The Metropolitan Chorus in Arlington Virginia for 38 years (1977–2015), and has been the Conductor of the renowned Kennedy Center Messiah Sing along every December 23 in Washington, DC, for over 20 years.
