= Freddie Jenkins =

American jazz trumpeter (1906–1978)

- Born: October 10, 1906; New York City, United States
- Died: July 12, 1978 (aged 71) Texas, United States
- Genres: Jazz
- Occupation: Musician
- Instrument: Trumpet

Freddie Jenkins (October 10, 1906 – July 12, 1978) was an American jazz trumpeter.

== Life and works ==
Freddie Jenkins was born in New York City, United States, on October 10, 1906. He played in the Jenkins Orphanage Band when young, and attended Wilberforce University. At Wilberforce, he played with Edgar Hayes and Horace Henderson (1924–1928) as a member of the Collegians band. Following graduation, Jenkins took a position in Duke Ellington's Orchestra in 1928. As a member, Jenkins soloed in the 1930 film Check and Double Check, during a performance of the song "Old Man Blues". He remained with the Ellington Orchestra until 1935, when lung problems forced him to quit.

He recovered and formed his own group in 1935, recording one session as a leader; sidemen included Ward Pinkett, Albert Nicholas and Bernard Addison. After this, Jenkins played with Luis Russell in 1936. In 1937–38, he played with Ellington again, and for a short time thereafter played with Hayes Alvis. After 1938, his lung ailment returned and he retired from performance. In later years, he worked in songwriting, disc jockeying, and in the music press, and became a deputy sheriff in Fort Worth. Writing about a concert played by Ellington and Sarah Vaughan, jazz historian Stanley Dance said:

There was a good crowd in the huge auditorium that night ... The promoter, we were told, had a problem because of ticket counterfeiting. Deputy Sheriff Freddy Jenkins came in dressed Texas style with a big hat on his head and gun on hip. He looked a picture of health as he made an onstage speech and presentation to his former employer.

Jenkins died in Texas on July 12, 1978.
