= Manzie Johnson =

American jazz drummer (1906–1971)

- Born: August 19, 1906; Putnam, CT
- Origin: United States
- Died: April 9, 1971 (aged 64); New York
- Genres: Jazz
- Occupation: Drummer
- Instrument(s): Piano, violin, drums

Isham "Manzie" Johnson (August 19, 1906 – April 9, 1971) was an American jazz drummer.

Johnson was raised in New York City, and played in Harlem in the 1920s with Fats Waller, James P. Johnson, and other stride pianists, before going on to work with Willie Gant (1926), June Clark, Elmer Snowden (ca. 1927), and Joe Steele.

He recorded with Jelly Roll Morton (1928), James P. Johnson, and Horace Henderson (1930) before joining Don Redman's orchestra, where he played from 1931 to 1937, appearing in the film Don Redman and his Orchestra (1934).

Johnson then spent time as a freelance musician, recording with Red Allen, Benny Morton, Willie Bryant, Lil Armstrong, Mezz Mezzrow, Redman and James P. Johnson again, Ovie Alston, and Fletcher Henderson. He served in the military during World War II, then played part-time with Sidney Bechet (ca. 1951), Garvin Bushell, and Happy Caldwell. Johnson never led his own recording session.
