= Harlem Blues and Jazz Band =

American jazz ensemble active since the 1970s

The Harlem Blues and Jazz Band is a jazz ensemble active since the 1970s.

The band was initiated by Al Vollmer in 1973, noting that a significant pool of jazz musicians who had played in the 1920s and 1930s lived in New York City and had retired as musicians. Its first bandleader was Clyde Bernhardt, who was replaced in 1980 by Bobby Williams. The band is touring in the US and in Europe since 1976 and has edited several LPs and CDs. The band hosted its 40th Anniversary Celebration on April 19, 2013, in New York.

== Members ==
- Doc Cheatham – trumpet
- Willie Singleton – trumpet
- Francis Williams – trumpet
- Art Baron – trombone
- Eddie Durham – trombone
- Roy Williams – trombone
- Barbara Dreiwitz – tuba
- Johnny Williams – tuba
- Happy Caldwell – clarinet
- Ray Blue – saxophone
- Bubba Brooks – saxophone
- Eddie Chamblee – saxophone
- Charles Frazier – saxophone
- Charlie Holmes – saxophone
- George James – saxophone
- George Kelly – saxophone
- Fred Staton – saxophone
- Reuben Jay Cole – piano
- Dill Jones – piano
- Reynold Mullins – piano
- Ram Ramirez – piano
- Gene Rodgers – piano
- Peck Morrison – bass
- Al Casey – guitar
- Fred Wurtzel – guitar
- Jackie Williams – drums
- Tommy Benford – drums
- Johnny Blowers – drums
- Ronnie Cole – drums
- Belton Evans – drums
- Shelton Gary – drums
- Viola Wells – vocals
- Princess White – vocals
