= Francis Williams (musician) =

American jazz trumpeter

- Born: September 20, 1910; McConnell's Mill, Pennsylvania, U. S.
- Died: October 2, 1983 (aged 73) Houston, Pennsylvania, U. S.
- Genres: Jazz; Latin jazz
- Occupation: Trumpeter
- Instrument: Trumpet
- Years active: 1930s–1983
- Formerly of: Chicago Nightingales; Harlem Blues and Jazz Band

Francis Williams (September 20, 1910, McConnell's Mill, Pennsylvania - October 2, 1983, Houston, Pennsylvania) was an American jazz trumpeter.

== Career ==
Williams's first gigs were with Frank Terry's Chicago Nightingales in the 1930s. In 1940 he moved to New York City, and in the first half of the decade played in the bands of Fats Waller, Claude Hopkins, Edgar Hayes, Ella Fitzgerald, Sabby Lewis, and Machito. From 1945 to 1949, and again in 1951, he played and recorded extensively as a member of Duke Ellington's orchestra.

Williams worked primarily with Latin jazz ensembles and New York theater bands in the 1950s and 1960s, and played with Clyde Bernhardt and the Harlem Blues and Jazz Band in addition to working with his own quartet. Near the end of his life he worked with Panama Francis.

== Personal life ==
Williams was a single father and had one son, actor Greg Morris.

== Death ==
Williams died on October 2, 1983, in Pennsylvania at the age of 73.
