= Clyde Bernhardt =

American jazz trombonist (1905–1986)

- Born: July 11, 1905; Gold Hill, North Carolina
- Died: May 20, 1986 (aged 80); Newark, New Jersey

Clyde Edric Barron Bernhardt (July 11, 1905 – May 20, 1986) was an American jazz trombonist.

Bernhardt was born in Gold Hill, North Carolina, and raised there and in Harrisburg, Pennsylvania. He started playing trombone at age 17, and in the 1920s played with a variety of lesser-known ensembles, such as Bill Eady's Ellwood Syncopators, Tillie Vennie, Odie Cromwell's Wolverine Syncopators, Charlie Grear's Original Midnite Ramblers, the Richard Cheatham Orchestra, the Whitman Sisters, Honey Brown's Orchestra, Henry P. McClane's Society Orchestra and Ray Parker. He worked with King Oliver in 1931, and through the middle of the decade did stints with Alex Hill, The Alabamians, Billy Fowler, Ira Coffey's Walkathonians, and Vernon Andrade.

In 1937, he joined Edgar Hayes's orchestra, remaining there through 1942, then worked with Jay McShann, Cecil Scott, Luis Russell, Leonard Feather, Pete Johnson, Wynonie Harris, Claude Hopkins, and Paul and Dud Bascomb. He led his own ensemble, called the Blue Blazers, before returning to play with Russell from 1948 to 1951. He recorded as a leader between 1946 and 1953, and on some of the recordings he sings under the pseudonym Ed Barron.

From 1952 to 1970, he played part-time with Joe Garland's Society Orchestra, mainly working outside of music during this time. Following this he led the Harlem Blues and Jazz Band between 1972 and 1979; his sidemen included Doc Cheatham, Charlie Holmes, Happy Caldwell, Tommy Benford, and Miss Rhapsody. Bernhardt's heath began to fail in 1979, and he gave up leadership of the Harlem Blues and Jazz Band, but played in Barry Martyn's Legends of Jazz until his death in Newark, New Jersey in 1986.

Shortly before his death he published an autobiography co-written with Sheldon Harris entitled I Remember.
