= Dave Nelson (trumpeter) =

American jazz musician

- Birth name: Davidson Nelson
- Born: 1905; Donaldsonville, Louisiana, U.S.
- Died: April 7, 1946 (aged 40–41); New York City, New York, U.S.
- Genres: Jazz
- Instruments: Trumpet, piano

Davidson C. "Dave" Nelson (1905 – April 7, 1946) was an American jazz trumpeter, pianist, and composer.

== Career ==
Nelson received classical training on piano and violin, but became best known in jazz as a trumpeter; he also was an arranger, having studied under Richard M. Jones. He played in Chicago with the Marie Lucas Orchestra, then worked with Ma Rainey, Jelly Roll Morton, Edgar Hayes, Jimmie Noone, Leroy Pickett, and Luis Russell. A nephew and mentee of King Oliver, he officially became a member of Oliver's band in 1929, playing trumpet on his recordings for Victor from 1929 to 1931, as well as composing and arranging the pieces. He also led his own ensembles from the late 1920s; Jimmy McLin was one of his sidemen in the 1930s.

Late in his career, he worked mostly as an arranger, and was on the staff of Lewis Publishing. He wrote and arranged pieces for Sidney Bechet, Mike Daniels, Bob Brookmeyer, Chris Barber, Lovie Austin, Kustbandet, Max Collie, Leon Redbone, Robert Schulz, Tuba Skinny, Tommy Ladnier, and others.
