= Fernando Arbello =

Puerto Rican jazz musician (1906–1970)

Fernando Arbello (May 30, 1906 – July 26, 1970) was a Puerto Rican jazz trombonist and composer who spent most of his career in America. Born in Ponce, Puerto Rico, to Eladio Arbelo and Raimunda Cruz, he was the second of seven children and first started on trombone at the age of 12. He later attended the Puerto Rico Conservatory of Music in Ponce. He played locally in high-school bands and symphony orchestras before moving to New York City in the mid-1920s, where he played with Earle Howard, Wilbur De Paris, June Clark, and Bingie Madison. Early in the 1930s, he played intermittently with Claude Hopkins for several years, then worked with Chick Webb, Fletcher Henderson, Lucky Millinder, Billy Hicks, and Fats Waller, before returning to play under Hopkins again near the end of the 1930s.

In 1940, Arbello worked for a few months with Zutty Singleton, then led his own unsuccessful band briefly in 1940–1941. Later that year, he played again in Henderson's ensemble, then with Marty Marsala (1941) and Jimmie Lunceford (1942–1946). He led his own band again late in the 1940s, maintaining it for several years, though he never recorded with this outfit. In 1953 he played with Rex Stewart and played in a reunion band with Henderson once more; in 1960 he was a sideman for Machito. He had a wife, with whom he had six children. He returned to Puerto Rico later in life, but regularly visited New York. In 1970, while visiting family in the Bronx, he fell ill and was hospitalized, where he subsequently died of a heart attack. Arbello is buried in Ferncliff Cemetery.
