= Don Kirkpatrick =

American jazz musician

Don Kirkpatrick (June 17, 1905 – May 13, 1956) was an American jazz pianist and arranger.

He was born in Charlotte, North Carolina, United States. Kirkpatrick worked intermittently with Chick Webb between 1927-1937 and with Don Redman from 1933-1937; it is for these associations that he is best known. Aside from this, he worked with Harry White, Elmer Snowden, Zutty Singleton, and Mezz Mezzrow, and worked as a freelance arranger after his time with Webb and Redman. Kirkpatrick also arranged for the bands of Benny Goodman, Count Basie, and Cootie Williams.

After the swing era, Kirkpatrick played with Bunk Johnson (1947), Sidney Bechet (1951), Wilbur De Paris (1952–55), and Doc Cheatham (1955). He never led his own recording session. In 1956 he died at age 50, of complications from pneumonia.
