= Hank Duncan =

American jazz pianist (1894–1968)

Hank Duncan (né Henry James Duncan; 26 October 1894 – 7 June 1968) was an American dixieland jazz pianist born in Bowling Green, Kentucky, probably better known for his work with Fess Williams, King Oliver, Tommy Ladnier, Sidney Bechet, Charles "Fat Man" Turner, and many others. He also toured extensively with Fats Waller. Duncan was sometimes referred to as "The Little Man From Memory Lane." He died in Long Island, New York.

== Selected discography ==
1. Black & White 31 (78 rpm)
  Hank Duncan Trio
  Recorded June 7, 1944, New York
  Bingie Madison (clarinet, tenor sax), Hank Duncan (piano), Goldie Lucas (drums)
  Side A: "I Gave You My Word"
  Matrix BW16
  Side B: "Maple Leaf Rag"
  Scott Joplin (music)
  Matrix BW13
  OCLC 124037858, 27955055
2. Black & White 32 (78 rpm)
  Hank Duncan Trio
  Recorded June 7, 1944, New York
  Bingie Madison (clarinet, tenor sax), Hank Duncan (piano), Goldie Lucas (drums)
  Side A: "Changes Always On My Mind"
  Hank Duncan (music)
  Matrix BW15
  Side B: "Upbeat"
  Bingie Madison (music)
  Matrix BW14
  OCLC 698385363
