= Earle Howard (musician) =

American jazz musician

- Born: June 3, 1904 Petersburg, VA
- Died: December 31, 1978 (aged 74) Modena, Italy
- Genres: Jazz
- Occupations: Musician and bandleader
- Instruments: Guitar; piano

Earle "Nappy" Howard (June 3, 1904 – December 31, 1978) was an American jazz pianist, bandleader, guitarist, and vocalist.

== Career ==
Howard was raised in New York City and went to the same high school as Fats Waller. He belonged to a youth band that included Benny Carter, Charlie Irvis, and Benny Morton.

He led bands in the 1920s, including one with Geechie Fields and Johnny Russell (c. 1926–1927), and later performed at Strand Danceland, New York, with a band that included saxophonists Fernando Arbello and Pete Brown (autumn 1928 – spring 1929), before accompanying Bill Benford (spring 1929 – spring 1930).

In 1930, he led a big band in Boston, and spent the next decade as a musical director and performing in clubs in New York, with residencies at the Saratoga Club, the Savoy Ballroom and in the Blackbirds revue, played with Leon Abbey, and toured in South America. He moved to Europe in the 1950s.

== Discography ==
- Americans in Europe Vol. 2 (Impulse!, 1963)
