= Tar Paper Stomp =

Single by Wingy Mannone's Orchestra
- Released: 1935
- Genre: New Orleans jazz
- Length: 3:07
- Label: Champion Records
- Songwriter(s): Wingy Manone

1937 78 re-release on Decca Records, 7425A.

"Tar Paper Stomp" is a 1930 jazz recording by American bandleader and jazz trumpeter Wingy Manone. The instrumental featured a riff that was used in the subsequent releases "Hot and Anxious", "There's Rhythm in Harlem", "In the Mood", "Hot String Beans", and in 1939 in "Jumpy Nerves".

== Background ==
Wingy Manone recorded "Tar Paper Stomp", also known as "Wingy's Stomp" or "Wingy's Blues", on August 28, 1930, in Richmond, Indiana. It was released on September 19, 1930, as a 78 rpm single on Champion Records (16153) credited to Barbeque Joe and his Hot Dogs. The A side was "Tin Roof Blues". It was re-released in 1935 credited to Wingy Mannone's Orchestra (40005). Decca Records acquired Champion Records in 1935. The recording was re-released in 1937 as a Decca 78 rpm single credited to Wingy Mannone & His Orchestra.

Horace Henderson used the same riff from "Tar Paper Stomp" in "Hot and Anxious", recorded by his brother's band, Fletcher Henderson and his Orchestra, on March 19, 1931, which was released on Columbia Records as by the Baltimore Bell Boys. Don Redman recorded "Hot and Anxious" in 1932 on Brunswick Records.

"Tar Paper Stomp" featured a riff that was used for "In the Mood" by Joe Garland, most prominently recorded by Glenn Miller in 1939. The main theme of "In the Mood", featuring repeated arpeggios rhythmically displaced, previously appeared in "Tar Paper Stomp".

Under copyright laws, a tune that had not been written down and registered with the copyright office was not protected. Wingy Manone had pointed out the similarity between "Tar Paper Stomp" and "In the Mood" to Joe Garland and to the publishing company of the song, Shapiro, Bernstein, and Company of New York. Manone also discussed the issue in Down Beat magazine. "Tar Paper Stomp" was copyrighted on November 6, 1941, as a pianoforte version by Peer International.

A song entitled "Hot String Beans" released by Joe Marsala on Vocalion in 1938 also featured the riff from "Tar Paper Stomp".

Wingy Manone recorded a new song entitled "Jumpy Nerves" on April 26, 1939, featuring Chu Berry on tenor saxophone that incorporated the riff from "Tar Paper Stomp" which was released as a 78 single that year on RCA Bluebird.

"Tar Paper Stomp" appeared on the compilation album Wingy Manone: Wingy Manone's Dixieland Jazz on Riverside, the 1998 Various Artists compilation CD New Orleans: The Cradle of Jazz on Charly Records, and on the 2008 German box set Classic Jazz on Membran International.

== Cover versions ==
The instrumental has been covered by Tom Baker's Chicago Seven and Friends on the 2004 collection Dixieland Jazz on Riff Raff, Lu Watters' Yerba Buena Jazz Band in 1994 on the album Live at Hambone Kelly's, Volume 2, Papa Bue's Viking Jazzband on Live in Dresden in 1972 on Miga, the Christiania Jazzband in 1973 on Sonet Records, and by Mora's Modern Rhythmists on the 2000 album Call of the Freak on Mr. Ace Records.

== Sources ==
- Clarke, Donald (2013). Chapter 9. The Swing Era Begins. The Rise and Fall of Popular Music. donaldclarkemusicbox.com.
- Sullivan, Steve (2013). Encyclopedia of Great Popular Song Recordings, Volume 2. Lanham, MD: Scarecrow Press, pp. 50–51.
- Jasen, David A. (2003). Tin Pan Alley: An Encyclopedia of the Golden Age of American Song. New York, NY: Routledge.
