= In the Mood =

Song popularized by Glenn Miller

Single by Glenn Miller and His Orchestra
- B-side: "I Want to Be Happy"
- Published: November 27, 1939 Shapiro, Bernstein & Co., Inc., New York
- Released: September 15, 1939
- Recorded: August 1, 1939
- Studio: RCA Victor, New York City
- Genre: Big band, swing
- Length: 3:40
- Label: Bluebird (US), His Master's Voice (UK)
- Songwriters: Wingy Manone (c), Andy Razaf (w), Joe Garland (a)

"In the Mood"

Single by Ernie Fields
- B-side: "Christopher Columbus"
- Released: June 1959
- Genre: Jazz, instrumental
- Length: 2:29
- Label: Rendezvous
- Songwriters: Wingy Manone (c), Andy Razaf (w), Joe Garland (a)

Ernie Fields singles chronology
"In the Mood" (1959)	"Begin the Beguine" (1960)

"In the Mood" is a popular big band-era jazz standard recorded by American bandleader Glenn Miller. "In the Mood" is based on the composition "Tar Paper Stomp" by Wingy Manone. The first recording under the name "In the Mood" was released by Edgar Hayes and his Orchestra in 1938.

In 1983, the Glenn Miller recording from 1939 was inducted into the Grammy Hall of Fame. In 2004, the recording was inducted into the Library of Congress National Recording Registry, which consists of recordings that are "culturally, historically, or aesthetically significant."

In 1999, National Public Radio included the 1939 Glenn Miller recording in its list of "The 100 most important American musical works of the 20th century".

Miller's "In the Mood", with "I Want to Be Happy" on the B-side, became the best-selling swing instrumental.

== Arrangement ==
"In the Mood" starts with a saxophone section theme based on repeated arpeggios that are rhythmically displaced; trumpets and trombones add accent riffs. The arrangement has two solo sections - a "tenor fight" or chase solo—in one recording between Tex Beneke and Al Klink—and a 16-bar trumpet solo by Clyde Hurley. At the end of the song, a coda climbs triumphantly, then sounds a sustained unison tonic pitch with a rim shot.

== History ==
"In the Mood" was an arrangement by Joe Garland based on an existing melody. Lyrics were added by Andy Razaf. The main theme with repeated arpeggios rhythmically displaced appeared under the title "Tar Paper Stomp" and was credited to trumpeter Wingy Manone. Manone recorded "Tar Paper Stomp" on August 28, 1930, in Richmond, Indiana, and released it as a 78 single for Champion Records under the name Barbecue Joe and his Hot Dogs. It was re-released in 1935 by Wingy Manone's Orchestra.

Horace Henderson used the same riff in "Hot and Anxious", which was recorded by his brother Fletcher Henderson on March 19, 1931, for Columbia under the name the Baltimore Bell Hops. Don Redman recorded "Hot and Anxious" for Brunswick in 1932.

Under copyright laws, a tune that had not been written down and registered with the copyright office could be appropriated by any musician with a good ear. Manone raised the similarity between "Tar Paper Stomp" and "In the Mood" to Joe Garland and to the publisher Shapiro, Bernstein, and Company of New York. Manone also discussed the issue in DownBeat magazine.

"Tar Paper Stomp" was copyrighted on November 6, 1941, as a pianoforte version by Peer International.

The first recording of Joe Garland's version of "In the Mood" was made by Edgar Hayes and his Orchestra in 1938 with Garland participating. It was released as a B-side to their recording of "Stardust" for Decca. This recording had a baritone saxophone duet rather than a tenor saxophone battle. The riff had appeared in a 1935 recording by the Mills Blue Rhythm Band entitled "There's Rhythm in Harlem", which had been composed and arranged by Garland. Before offering it to Miller, Garland sold it in 1938 to Artie Shaw, who chose not to record it because the original arrangement was too long, but he did perform it in concert.

Artie Shaw's version was over six minutes long and met a lackluster audience response. Jerry Gray arranged Shaw's version. The band later performed a shorter version. The Hayes recording was over three minutes in length to fit on one side of a 78 record.

The song was sold in 1939 to Glenn Miller, who experimented with the arrangement. The author of the final arrangement is unknown. One possibility is Eddie Durham, because he wrote other arrangements on the same day that "In the Mood" was recorded. Other possibilities include pianist Chummy MacGregor, who was Miller's chief arranger, John Chalmers, and Miller himself. According to an account by MacGregor, "all they used of the original arrangement were the two front saxophone strains and another part that occurred later on in the arrangement." Both MacGregor and Miller were involved in creating the final arrangement: "MacGregor mentioned that additional solos were added to the original arrangement and he wrote the finishing coda. Miller probably edited some of the arrangement along with MacGregor." In its final form, it is an example of hemiola rhythm.

Two copyrights were filed by Joseph Copeland Garland on June 8 and November 26, 1938, before the song was published by Lewis Music Pub. Co., Inc. on October 31, 1939, with Joe Garland the lone songwriter. Then on November 27, a copyright was filed with both Garland and Razaf by Shapiro, Bernstein & Co., Inc. of New York. A final copyright was filed by Shapiro, Bernstein on December 11, 1939, worded as follows: "In the mood; fox-trot, Andy Razaf & Joe Garland, arr. Joe Garland as suggested by Glenn Miller; orch. pts., with w."

Two editions of the sheet music are in circulation. The 1939 publication credited to Garland and Razaf is in A♭ and has lyrics beginning: "Mister What-cha-call-em, what-cha doin' tonight?" These lyrics were used in the 1952 recording by the Andrews Sisters, which is perhaps the best-known vocal version of the number. The 1960 reprint credited only to Garland (with piano arrangement by Robert C. Haring) is in G and has lyrics beginning: "Who's the livin' dolly with the beautiful eyes?"

On August 1, 1939, Miller's version was recorded at the RCA Victor Studios at 155 East 24th Street in New York City. The personnel on Miller's recording included Al Mastren and Paul Tanner on trombone; Clyde Hurley, Legh Knowles, and Dale McMickle on trumpet; Wilbur Schwartz on clarinet; Hal McIntyre on alto saxophone; Tex Beneke, Al Klink, and Harold Tennyson on tenor saxophone; Chummy MacGregor on piano; Richard Fisher on guitar; Rowland Bundock on double bass; and Moe Purtill on drums.

== Other versions ==
The 1939 sheet music cover, "Introduced by Glenn Miller", Shapiro, Bernstein, and Co., New York

In December 1939, The King Sisters, as The Four King Sisters, recorded the first vocal version with the Alvino Rey Orchestra, which was released by RCA Victor Bluebird (B-10545).

Miller and band perform a version of the song in the 1941 film Sun Valley Serenade.

It subsequently became the signature tune of the Joe Loss Orchestra in Great Britain.

In February 1944, the Glenn Miller RCA Victor Bluebird 1939 studio recording of "In the Mood" was released as a V-Disc, one of a series of recordings sent free by the U.S. War Department to overseas military personnel during World War II. A second version, recorded by Glenn Miller's Overseas Band in 1945, was released in May 1948. A new recording by Glenn Miller with the American Band of the Allied Expeditionary Forces was broadcast to Germany in 1944 on the radio program The Wehrmacht Hour.

This piece of music was not new in Europe. The first Swiss record of "In the Mood" was released in April 1940 by Teddy Stauffer und seine Original Teddies in Zurich. Another interpretation was made by Ernst van 't Hoff in February 1941 in Berlin.

In 1951, a Ferranti Mark 1 computer at the University of Manchester played "In the Mood", one of the first songs to be played by a computer, and the oldest known recording of digitally generated music.

In December 1959, the rendition of "In the Mood" that Ernie Fields and his Orchestra recorded peaked at number four by means of the Billboard popular hit parade and number seven by both the Rhythm and Blues and the Cash Box hit parades.

Bette Midler covered the song on her album The Divine Miss M in 1973, with additional lyrics by herself and Barry Manilow. It was released as a single in 1974 and reached number 51 on the Billboard Hot 100 chart.

Jonathan King, under the name Sound 9418, released his version in 1976 which reached No. 46 on the UK Singles Chart.

In the winter of 1977, a novelty version by the Henhouse Five Plus Too (a Ray Stevens project) employing the sounds of clucking chickens entered the U.S. Pop Top 40 (Billboard No. 40, Cash Box number 37).

John Lee Hooker said that "In the Mood" was the inspiration for his song "I'm in the Mood", which became a number-one hit on the R&B Singles chart in 1951.

In 2025, Pentatonix covered the song as a mashup with "Run Rudolph Run" entitled "Moody Rudy" for their Christmas album Christmas in the City.

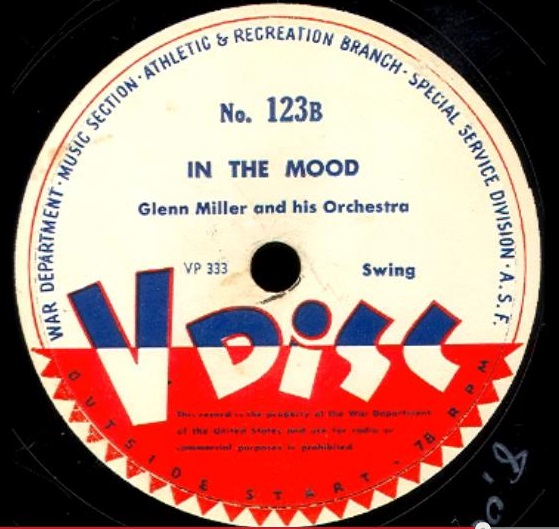
V-Disc release

== See also ==
- List of 1930s jazz standards
