= Bernard Addison =

American jazz guitarist (1905–1990)

- Born: Bernard Sylvester Addison; April 15, 1905; Annapolis, Maryland, U.S.
- Died: December 18, 1990 (aged 85) Rockville Centre, New York, U.S.
- Genres: Jazz, swing
- Occupation: Musician
- Instrument: Guitar
- Years active: 1920–1970s

Bernard Sylvester Addison (April 15, 1905 – December 18, 1990) was an American jazz guitarist.

== Career ==
Addison was born in Annapolis, Maryland. At an early age, he learned mandolin and violin.

== Career ==
After moving to Washington, D.C. in 1920, Addison played banjo, first with Claude Hopkins. He then moved to New York City and worked with Sonny Thompson and recorded for the first time in 1924. During the 1920s, he dropped banjo for acoustic guitar. In the 1920s and 1930s, he played with Louis Armstrong, Adelaide Hall, Fletcher Henderson, Bubber Miley, Art Tatum, and Fats Waller, and recorded with Red Allen, Coleman Hawkins, Horace Henderson, Freddie Jenkins, Sara Martin, Jelly Roll Morton, and Mamie Smith.

In 1936, John Mills of the Mills Brothers died, and Addison replaced him on guitar. For two years he toured and recorded with the Mills Brothers, increasing his popularity. After departing the Mills Brothers, he had little trouble finding work. He recorded with Benny Carter and Mezz Mezzrow. He played with Stuff Smith and recorded with Billie Holiday. In 1940, he recorded with Armstrong and Sidney Bechet. He began to lead bands until he was drafted during World War II. In the late 1950s, he reunited with Henderson and played guitar for the Ink Spots. He performed at the Newport Jazz Festival with Eubie Blake in 1960 and recorded a solo album. The rest of his career he spent teaching.

Addison's only album as a leader, Pete's Last Date, was reissued under the name of saxophonist Pete Brown.
