= Wardell Jones =

American jazz trumpeter (born 1905, died)

- Born: c. 1905
- Genre: Jazz
- Occupations: Musician; arranger
- Instruments: Trumpet; trombone
- Years active: 1930s–1940
- Formerly of: Bill Brown; Benny Carter; Bingie Madison; Mills Blue Rhythm Band; Fats Waller; Hot Lips Page

Wardell "Preacher" Jones (born c. 1905) was an American jazz trumpeter.

Early in his career, Jones played in New York City in the ballroom bands of Bill Brown and Benny Carter before joining Bingie Madison's ensemble. Jones joined the Mills Blue Rhythm Band, playing with the group from 1930 to 1936 and recording with them several times. In addition to the trumpet, he occasionally played trombone with the group and did arranging work. Later in the 1930s, he played with Fats Waller and Hot Lips Page, but appears to have left music after 1940.
