= Bob Ysaguirre =

Bob Ysaguirre, also known as Clarence Fitzroy Ysaguirre, (February 22, 1897 – March 27, 1982) was a Belizean-born American double bass and tuba player who had an active performance career from 1917 into the late 1960s.

== Life and career ==
Robert "Bob" Ysaguirre was born in what is today known as Belize City, Belize on February 22, 1897. He began studying the tuba at the age of 18 with Henry Buller. His career started in his native country where he played tuba in a military band from 1917-1919. In the early 1920s he immigrated to the United States where he initially settled in New Orleans. There he joined trumpeter Amos White's band in 1922; making his debut with the group at the pavilion located at the Spanish Fort. He relocated to New York City to join Armand J. Piron's jazz orchestra in 1923. He remained in that group until 1925 when he left to join Elmer Snowden’s band.

After working with Snowden in 1925-1926, Ysaguirre played in Alex Jackson's Plantation Orchestra from 1926 through 1929. He reunited with Snowden in 1927 to record with his band in a record directed by trombonist Te Roy Williams. He was a member of Fletcher Henderson's band in 1929-1930, and then played with Horace Henderson's band in 1930-1931. He then spent a nine year long period performing and recording with Don Redman and his band from 1931-1940.

After this Ysaguirre ceased performing full time, but continued to periodically perform in freelance gigs in the New York City region into the late 1960s. He made a living as a painter and decorator. He died in New York City on March 27, 1982 at the age of 85.

== Partial discography ==
- Piron's New Orleans Orchestra 1923-1925 (1925, Retrieval)
- Don Redman 1931-1933 (Original Jazz Classics; re-released in 1991)
- Henry 'Red' Allen 1933-1935 (1935, Original Jazz Classics)
