= Ted McCord (musician) =

American jazz musician

Theodore McCord (May 17, 1907 – after 1947) was an American jazz reedist, principally active in the 1920s and 1930s. He was also known by the stage name Jobetus.

Born in Alabama's largest city, Birmingham, McCord was the twin brother of Castor McCord, also a reedist; while both brothers played tenor saxophone and clarinet, Ted played alto saxophone in addition. He was a student at Wilberforce University in the 1920s, where he played in a student group led by Horace Henderson. He also played in Edgar Hayes' group, the Blue Grass Buddies, as well as McKinney's Cotton Pickers and the Mills Blue Rhythm Band, including for their sessions with Louis Armstrong. Other credits include recordings with King Carter and the singer Ollie Shepard.

Castor McCord left music In 1940, when he was 33 years old, and opened a hairdresser shop in Manhattan, running it until his death on February 14, 1963, three months before his 56th birthday. The year of Ted McCord's death has remained unspecified.
