= George Washington (trombonist) =

- Born: October 18, 1907; Brunswick, Georgia, U.S.
- Genres: Jazz
- Occupation: Trombonist
- Years active: 1920s–1960s

George Washington (October 18, 1907 - ?) was an American jazz trombonist.

== Early life and education ==
Washington was born in Brunswick, Georgia, and raised in Jacksonville, Florida. He began playing trombone at age ten, and attended Edward Waters College in the early-1920s.

== Career ==
Washington relocated to Philadelphia in 1925 and played with J.W. Pepper before moving to New York City shortly thereafter.

In New York, Washington studied under Walter Damrosch at the New York Conservatory, playing with various ensembles in the late 1920s. In 1931, he began playing with Don Redman, and gigged with Benny Carter in 1932 and Spike Hughes in 1933. In the mid-1930s, he played and arranged for the Mills Blue Rhythm Band and worked with Red Allen and Fletcher Henderson. From 1937 to 1943, he played in Louis Armstrong's orchestra.

After his tenure with Armstrong he moved to the West Coast, and played with Horace Henderson, Carter again, and Count Basie. From 1947 he led his own ensemble, playing in California and the Las Vegas Strip. He and drummer Johnny Otis collaborated often, and in 1960 Washington worked with Joe Darensbourg. He did freelance work as a player and arranger later in his life.

Gunther Schuller wrote of him:

George Washington is another one of the many gifted lesser-known musicians jazz has produced. While not a path-breaking major figure, Washington was a consistently inventive soloist whose fine work can be heard not only with the Blue Rhythm Band but with Armstrong's late 1930s' band and Count Basie. The range of his talent can be assessed on, for example, Kokey Joe (hot and growly, rangey) or Harlem After Midnight.
