= Really the Blues =

1946 memoir by Mezz Mezzrow

- Cover of the 1998 Citadel Press edition
- Author: Mezz Mezzrow and Bernard Wolfe
- Language: English
- Subject: Jazz, autobiography
- Genre: Memoir
- Publisher: Random House
- Publication date: 1946
- Publication place: United States
- Media type: Print
- Pages: 406

Really the Blues is a 1946 memoir by jazz musician Mezz Mezzrow, written with novelist Bernard Wolfe. It recounts Mezzrow's life from a Chicago boyhood and reform-school upbringing through his career as a clarinetist and saxophonist, his time in New Orleans and New York, and his involvement in bootlegging, drug dealing, and record production, while playing alongside musicians such as Louis Armstrong, Bix Beiderbecke, and Fats Waller.

The memoir is noted for its narration in the jive slang of the era and for its account of Mezzrow's claimed racial "conversion", including his assertion that he was accepted as Black, moved into a segregated cellblock at Rikers Island on that basis, and married a Black woman; scholars have since described this stance as that of a "voluntary negro."

== Summary ==
Mezzrow narrates his life from his birth as Milton Mesirow in 1899 to Russian-Jewish immigrant parents in Chicago who hoped he would one day take over the family drugstore business, opening with his adolescence at the Pontiac Reformatory in Michigan, where he first took up the clarinet in the institution's band; the opening chapter closes with his assertion that he "went in there green" but "came out chocolate brown." He describes his lifelong ambition, stated in the book's opening pages, as being "a Negro musician, hipping the world about the blues the way only Negroes can." The narrative follows him through Prohibition-era Chicago, where he worked as a bootlegger, and later to New Orleans and Harlem, where he sold marijuana and became known among his customers for his command of jive slang.

Mezzrow presents his life story as a passage from whiteness to a self-declared black identity, telling a prison deputy at Rikers Island, where he was sentenced for drug possession, "I'm colored, even if I don't look it," and noting that his draft card listed his race as "Negro." The narrative's climax comes when Mezzrow, imprisoned at Rikers, plays jazz as part of a mixed-race prison ensemble and is left wondering whether he has, "at last," become "a real jazz musician." Throughout, he recounts marrying a Black woman, a union Ebony magazine described at the time as having made him "a Negro officially and for the records."

== Background ==
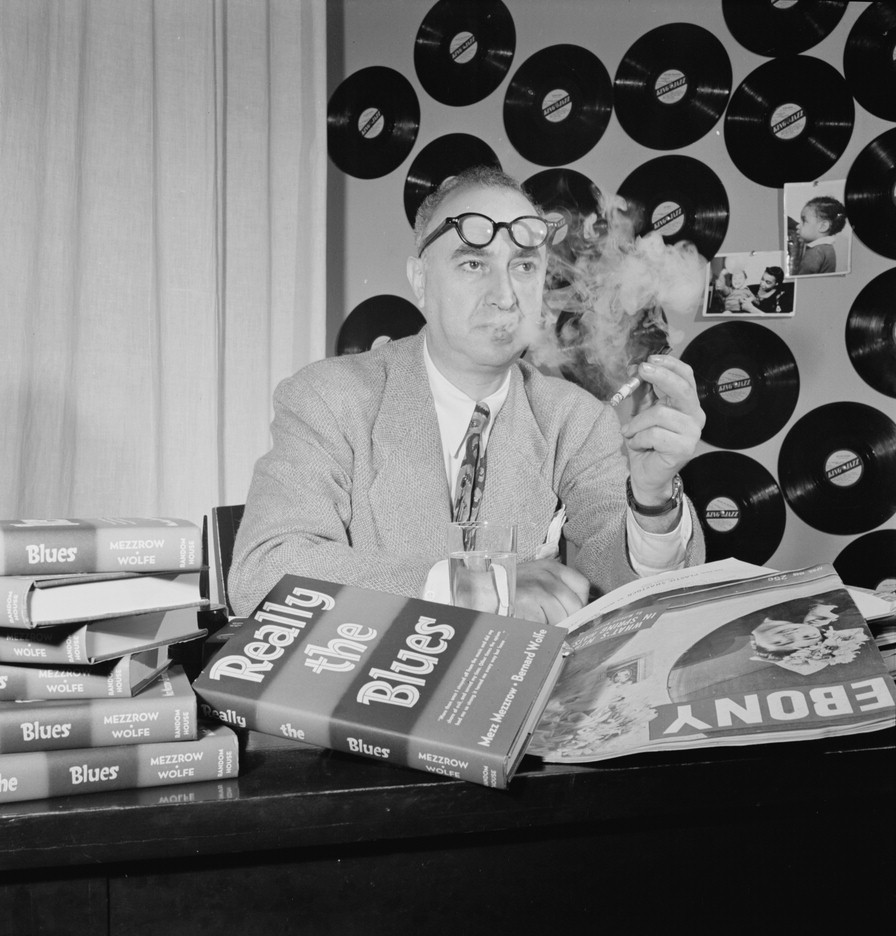
Mezzrow with copies of Really the Blues in his office, New York City, c. November 1946

Mezzrow met Wolfe, a Yale-educated writer, in a Greenwich Village bar in his mid-40s; Wolfe was friends with Henry Miller and had read French novelists such as André Gide and Louis-Ferdinand Céline. Over the course of a couple of years, the two turned Mezzrow's life story into the book, which was published by Random House in 1946 with four appendices, including a translation of an extended jive-dialogue passage and a glossary of the slang.

== Reception ==
On publication, the memoir drew substantial coverage in the Black press; Ebony profiled the book under the headline "Case History of an Ex-White Man" — a title reportedly suggested by Richard Wright — describing Mezzrow as "one of the few whites" to have "passed through the Jim Crow portals of Negro life to live on equal terms with its harried inhabitants," while noting that, "physically speaking," he "couldn't pass for Negro by any stretch of the imagination." The magazine predicted the book would be "an amazing raw and racy saga" that would "send the book soaring into the best seller class." By one estimate, it had sold between 20,000 and 30,000 copies by 1952, and it reappeared on Down Beat magazine's bestseller list in 1958 alongside Billie Holiday's Lady Sings the Blues. Reviewing the book in Commentary in 1947, Kurt List was more critical, writing that "for all the changes he has made in his life, Mezzrow still has the white man's concept of the Negro." Bucklin Moon, reviewing the book alongside Rudi Blesh's Shining Trumpets under the title "The Real Thing" in The New Republic (November 4, 1946), took the more celebratory view, calling it "an intense, sincere and honest book. It makes all the novels with jazz backgrounds seem as phony as an Eddie Condon concert." A Newsweek review went further, comparing Mezzrow to Bessie Smith and asserting that whereas Smith merely "sang the blues," Mezzrow "lived them, brutally." Richard B. Gehman, writing in Saturday Review, called it the first jazz history told by "an insider."

Mezzrow's narration presents his claimed racial "conversion", including the assertion that his skin had darkened, without irony, but its jive-translation and glossary appendices signal an awareness of its own performance, a device Ben Ratliff, introducing the 2016 edition, suggested might amount to "a giant wink." Co-author Bernard Wolfe extended this critique after publication in the essay "Ecstatic in Blackface: The Negro as a Song-and-Dance Man", arguing that the "authentic" black performer prized by white audiences could himself be "dramatizing the white man's image of the 'spontaneous' Negro 'as he really is.'"

The book was reissued by NYRB Classics in 2016 with an introduction by jazz critic Ben Ratliff. Reviewing the reissue for The Wall Street Journal, Martin Riker called the book "an American counter-culture classic" and "a stylized oral history that anticipates the Beat novel," describing Mezzrow's narrating voice as "funny, impulsive, full of itself and often spectacularly scatological." Brooke Horvath, writing in Review of Contemporary Fiction, argued the memoir traced "the roots of rock, [...] of beat and hence [of] the beginnings of the sixties counterculture."

Writing in The Arts Fuse, Matt Hanson called the memoir a "popular and raffish" account whose "rambunctious enthusiasm for jazz and the world it shaped and defined keeps the pages turning," while noting it as one of Woody Allen's favorite books. In Cleaver Magazine, Beth Johnston described the book as carried by "the jazzy, riffing quality of the [...] prose" and by Mezzrow's observations on the racial dynamics of the early-20th-century jazz world, though she found its structure demanded patience from readers before it built into "an unexpected sense of hope, of the power of persistence, of the redemption of art."

== Legacy ==
According to Gayle Wald, the book "was fundamental to the development of the bohemian sensibilities" of Jack Kerouac and Allen Ginsberg, and Norman Mailer "used Mezzrow as the prototype" for his 1957 essay "The White Negro: Superficial Reflections on the Hipster". Ginsberg, who read the book at the Columbia University bookstore in the mid-1940s, later described it as "the first signal into white culture of the underground black, hip culture" that predated his own generation. Clarinetist Bob Wilber wrote that for aspiring white jazz musicians of a later generation, Really the Blues was a "bible" from which they drew inspiration. Jeffrey Melnick has similarly grouped Mezzrow's memoir with Artie Shaw's autobiography as "sourcebooks on Jewish white Negroism", a tradition of Jewish self-fashioning through Black culture.

The book has since been examined by scholars for its racial and Jewish-American dimensions, including Wald's essay, later a chapter of her book Crossing the Line: Racial Passing in Twentieth-Century U.S. Literature and Culture (2000), and Daniel Stein's 2019 article in Anglia.
