= Viola Gertrude Wells =

American singer

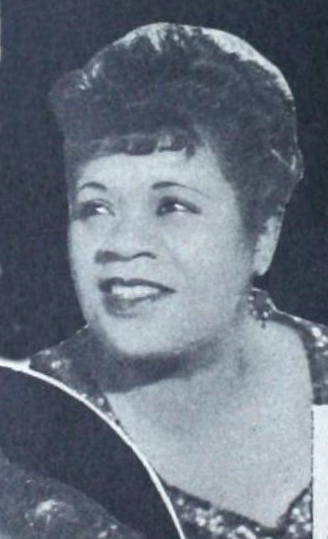
Viola Wells in a 1945 advertisement

Viola Gertrude Wells Evans (December 14, 1902, Newark, New Jersey – December 22, 1984, Belleville, New Jersey), better known by her stage names Viola Wells or Miss Rhapsody, was an American jazz, blues, and religious singer.

The book Swing City: Newark Nightlife, 1925-50 by Barbara J. Kukla is dedicated to Viola Wells.

== Early life ==
Wells was the first child of Robert Olivia Simmons and Earle Henry Wells, who had moved to Newark from Surry County, Virginia. She had three siblings: Isabelle, Estelle, and Earle. When her mother died from giving birth to her sister Estelle, she briefly went to live with her maternal grandparents Rev. Morgan and Annie Simmons in Virginia. Rev. Morgan was a Baptist minister who only liked to listen to secular music. In contrast, his son "Uncle Charlie" was popular locally for his song and dance routines.

She returned to Newark, New Jersey, in 1910 after her father remarried. She began singing and dancing in her grandparents' barn. She would later begin singing in her church's Salika Johnson choir under the direction of her music and piano teacher, Ruth Reid. This choir traveled to cities outside of New Jersey to perform. WOR Radio in Newark invited her to sing on air to raise money for the first Black YMCA. She also sang on the glee club in her high school and in talent shows.

She also sang at contests at Newark’s own Orpheum Theater where she would multiple contests. Her quick notability led to her being given the stage name "Miss Rhapsody." This nickname was given to her by a Pennsylvania columnist because she always sang the songs “Rhapsody in rhythm” and “Rhapsody in song." She would also perform frequently at the Minis Theater in Newark, Sunset Crystal Palace in Kansas City and Apollo Theater in Harlem, New York.

Her first marriage was to Howard Nicholas when she was nineteen.

== Career ==
In the early stages of her career, she worked in numerous clubs in Atlantic City in the 1920s. This led her to performing in not only clubs in Atlantic City, but also being to perform all around the tri-state area.

Her career began with singing in traveling shows. She once filled in for Mamie Smith. She was in a TOBA circuit in 1921. Wells frequently sang at local Newark jazz clubs and eventually moved to Harlem to sing at nightclubs there. She eventually began touring throughout the US with different bands in the 1920s. In the 1930s, her first big break was touring with the Banjo Bernie Band from Baltimore and then with Ida Cox. At the end of the 1930s, she moved to Kansas City, where she ran a nightclub and headed a band.

She moved back to Newark in the 1940s, where she met and married guitarist Harold Underhill. She began to sing at various New York City clubs (such as Harlem's Apollo Theater), occasionally under the name "Viola Underhill". She replaced Helen Humes as a singer in the Count Basie Orchestra. By the 1940s, she was often billed as "The Ebony Stick Of Dynamite". She also sang at United Service Organizations shows at military bases.

She was a singer on the album Encore For The Chicago Blues released in 1968 by Spivey Records. She produced a blues album on 22 April 1972 called Miss Rhapsody.

Later on, Wells would become popular in Europe as well. Notably, she did seven European tours throughout her career, earning her notoriety in countries such as Netherlands and Belgium. A documentary about her life and career made in France would be released in 1975.

Wells would inspire author Barbara J. Kukla to write and publish Swing City: Newark Nightlife, 1925-50 in 1991. The book would detail and depict how the jazz music scene was in said time period. Kukla would dedicate the book to Wells.

== Retirement and death ==
She retired from music in 1946 due to diabetes, and in an effort to spend more time with her family after her father was murdered. She was brought out of retirement twice in her life; first, by blues historian Sheldon Harris who helped revive her career in the 1960s. The second time, she toured with the Harlem Blues and Jazz Band in the 1970s. A fan in London stepped on her foot, which in her condition eventually led to its amputation. She received many honors in her later years, including the key to Newark. She died in December 1984, and is buried in Heavenly Rest Cemetery in East Hanover, New Jersey.
