= Crawford Wethington =

American jazz musician

Arthur Crawford Wethington (January 26, 1904 – September 11, 1994) was an American jazz saxophonist. He was born in Chicago and died in White Plains, New York.

A graduate of the Chicago College of Music, Wethington worked under pianist Lottie Hightower in the mid-1920s before taking a position in Carroll Dickerson's band in 1928; in 1929 this ensemble played with Louis Armstrong in New York City. Between 1930 and 1936 he played with the Mills Blue Rhythm Band, recording several times with the group. He recorded with Edgar Hayes in 1937 and also worked with Cab Calloway, Red Allen, and Adelaide Hall. After 1937 he quit performing full-time but was active as a music teacher, and in the 1960s he took work in New York City as a supervisor for a transit line power plant.
