= Carl Warwick (musician) =

American jazz musician

William Carl "Bama" Warwick (October 27, 1917, Birmingham, Alabama – 2003, Philadelphia) was an American jazz trumpeter.

Warwick lived in Brookside, Alabama, as a child, then moved in with Charlie Shavers after moving northward in the early 1930s. Together, they moved to Philadelphia in 1936 and became members of Frank Fairfax's band, playing alongside Dizzy Gillespie. They subsequently played with Tiny Bradshaw and the Mills Blue Rhythm Band. After Shavers left to join John Kirby's ensemble, Warwick worked with Teddy Hill, Edgar Hayes, Don Redman, and Bunny Berigan.

During World War II, Warwick conducted a military band. He played with Woody Herman in 1944-45, then worked with Buddy Rich. In the 1950s he led his own group and also worked with Lucky Millinder and Brew Moore; he returned to Gillespie's employ in 1956, playing intermittently with him until 1961. He took a position directing music with the New York City Department of Corrections in 1966. In 1972, he appeared at the Newport Jazz Festival with Benny Carter.
