= Johnny Russell (saxophonist) =

American jazz tenor saxophonist (1909–1991)

John W. Russell (June 4, 1909, Charlotte, North Carolina - July 26, 1991, New York City) was an American jazz tenor saxophonist.

Russell was raised in New York, and began on violin at age nine, later picking up saxophone and clarinet. He played in both capacities with Jimmy Campbell in 1926, then worked at the Strand Danceland under Earle Howard. While he continued to play violin in live settings, no recordings of him as a violinist are known. After working in the early 1930s with Harry White, Russell replaced Chu Berry in Benny Carter's ensemble in 1933-34, then joined up with Willie Bryant in 1935-36. He toured with Bobby Martin's orchestra in Europe in 1938, and played with this group on the soundtrack to the 1938 Erich von Stroheim film, L'alibi; it is for his solos in this recording that he is best known. Following this Russell remained in Europe to play with Willie Lewis from 1939 to 1941. Upon his return to the U.S. he played with Garvin Bushell briefly before being drafted. He played in military bands, including Russell Wooding's, during World War II, then played after the war with Cecil Scott (1945) and Eddie Cornelius. Russell stopped playing full-time later in the 1940s, but occasionally did club dates later in his life.
