= Greely Walton =

American jazz musician

Greely Walton (October 4, 1904 in Mobile, Alabama – October 9, 1993) was an American jazz tenor saxophonist.

Walton played violin in his youth before settling on saxophone, and studied music at the University of Pittsburgh in the 1920s. He worked first with Elmer Snowden in 1926, then with Benny Carter (1929) and for an extended period with Luis Russell (1930–37). During this time Russell's ensemble was occasionally led by Red Allen, and served as Louis Armstrong's backing ensemble for a period. After leaving Russell, Walton worked with Vernon Andrade (1938), Horace Henderson (1941), Cootie Williams as a baritone saxophonist (1942–43), and Cab Calloway (1943–45). From 1945-47 he acted as musical director for The Ink Spots, and played with Noble Sissle and Sy Oliver towards the end of the decade. He did work in radio and television in the 1950s before retiring from music in that decade.
