= Geechie Fields =

American jazz musician

- Birth name: Julius J. Fields
- Born: September 9, 1904
- Origin: Charleston, South Carolina, U.S.
- Died: August 15, 1997 (aged 92)
- Genres: Jazz
- Instruments: Trombone

Julius J. "Geechie" Fields (September 9, 1904 – August 15, 1997) was an American jazz trombonist.

== Early life ==
Fields grew up in Charleston, South Carolina, and learned to play trombone at the Jenkins Orphanage.

== Career ==
In the early 1920s he became a touring member of the Jenkins Orphanage bands, then relocated to New York City, where he was a house musician at John O'Connor's club. Primarily a trombonist, he was also credited as playing the alto saxophone and clarinet. He played with Earle Howard in 1926 and 1927, recorded with Jelly Roll Morton in 1928 and 1930, and with Charlie Skeete and Bill Benford in 1929. He also worked with Clarence Williams and James P. Johnson.

== Personal life ==
In the 1930s, Fields married singer Myra Johnson. He later left music to become a boxing coach.
