= Castor McCord =

American jazz musician

Castor "Cass" McCord (May 17, 1907 — February 14, 1963) was an American jazz saxophonist, born in Alabama's largest city, Birmingham, who, with his twin brother, clarinetist and alto saxophonist Ted McCord, started out, at age 17, as a member of Edgar Hayes' Blue Grass Buddies in 1924. Along with Hayes, he attended Ohio's Wilberforce University, where he played in the student band run by Horace Henderson. Later in the 1920s he moved from Ohio to Atlantic City and then to New York City, where he played with the Mills Blue Rhythm Band and Louis Armstrong early in the 1930s. His other collaborators included Eubie Blake and Charlie Matson.

In the middle of the 1930s, McCord played in France for a year and toured India with Leon Abbey in 1936. McCord led his own trio in Amsterdam in 1937, then worked with Walter Rains in Rotterdam the next year. He moved back to New York near the end of the decade, returning to briefly play under Abbey as well as in the bands of Benny Carter, Eddie Mallory, and Claude Hopkins.

In 1940, when he was 33 years old, McCord left music to open a hairdresser shop in Manhattan, running it until his death three months before his 56th birthday.
