= Charlie Holmes =

American jazz saxophonist (1910–1985)

- Born: Charles William Holmes; January 27, 1910; Boston, Massachusetts, U.S.
- Died: September 19, 1985 (aged 75) Stoughton, Massachusetts, U.S.
- Genres: Jazz; swing; classical
- Occupation: Musician
- Instruments: Alto saxophone; clarinet; oboe
- Years active: 1926–1951, 1970s
- Formerly of: Boston Civic Symphony; Luis Russell; Mills Blue Rhythm Band; Cootie Williams; Louis Armstrong; Harlem Blues and Jazz Band; Kustbandet

Charlie Holmes (January 27, 1910, near Boston, Massachusetts – September 19, 1985, in Stoughton, Massachusetts) was an American jazz alto saxophonist of the swing era. He also played clarinet and oboe for the Boston Civic Symphony in 1926.

== Career ==
Holmes began playing the alto saxophone at age 16 and emulated the style of his childhood friend, Johnny Hodges. He began playing professionally a week later. After moving to New York City, he worked for a variety of groups, including Luis Russell in 1928. Between 1929 and 1930, he recorded with Red Allen, and is best known for composing "Sugar Hill Function". He would work with Russell again a few times, and in 1932, he joined the Mills Blue Rhythm Band. He was in John Kirby's Sextet, Cootie Williams's Orchestra, and Louis Armstrong's band for much of the next two decades.

He left music in 1951 and did not return for twenty years. He returned to work in Clyde Bernhardt's Harlem Blues and Jazz Band and later played for the Swedish big band Kustbandet. They made a recording together in 1975 (Kenneth Records KS 2039). Holmes was not fit to go to Stockholm, so he played his solos on tape in a New York City studio, and the material was transferred to the Swedish master tape. He never acted as a leader in any recording or group.
