= George James (musician) =

American jazz musician

George James (December 7, 1906, in Boggs, Oklahoma – January 30, 1995, in Columbus, Ohio) was an American jazz saxophonist, clarinetist, and flautist.

== Life and career ==
James's career began late in the 1920s, in the bands of Charlie Creath and Johnny Neal. He moved to Chicago in 1928, where he played with Jimmie Noone, Sammy Stewart, Ida Marples, Jabbo Smith, and Bert Hall. In 1931 through March 1932 he toured with Louis Armstrong, and he remained in New York City at the end of the tour, where he joined the Savoy Bearcats and, later, Charlie Turner's Arcadians. Fats Waller assumed leadership of the Arcadians in the middle of the decade, and James played under him until 1937.

James finished the decade of the 1930s playing in the Blackbirds Revue. Early in the 1940s he worked with James P. Johnson, Benny Carter, Teddy Wilson, and Lucky Millinder, and led his own band in 1943-44. Later in the decade James played with Claude Hopkins and Noble Sissle. He was active both as a leader and a sideman into the 1970s, playing with Clyde Bernhardt and the Harlem Blues and Jazz Band in that decade.
