= Ernest Hill (musician) =

American jazz musician

Ernest "Bass" Hill (March 14, 1900, Pittsburgh, Pennsylvania – September 16, 1964, New York City) was an American jazz double-bassist.

Hill played from 1924 with Claude Hopkins, and remained with him on a tour of Europe with Josephine Baker the following year. Hill and Hopkins collaborated numerous times over the next few years and again in the 1940s. In 1928 he played with Leroy Smith & His Orchestra and Bill Brown & His Brownies, and worked in the Eugene Kennedy Orchestra the next year. In the 1930s he played with Willie Bryant, Bobby Martin's Cotton Club Serenaders, Benny Carter, Chick Webb, and Rex Stewart.

Hill was in Europe in the late 1930s when he fled to Switzerland at the outbreak of World War II. There he played with Mac Strittmacher before returning to the United States in 1940. In that year, he recorded with Eddie South and Hot Lips Page. Following this he played with Maurice Hubbard, Hopkins again, Zutty Singleton, Louis Armstrong (1943), Cliff Jackson, Herbie Cowens, and Minto Kato. In 1949 he returned to Europe, where he played in Switzerland and Italy with Bill Coleman and then in Germany with Big Boy Goudie until 1952.

Upon his return to the US he worked in New York City with Happy Caldwell, Henry Morrison, and Wesley Fagan. He worked in the musicians' union in the last decade of his life.
