= Jimmy McLin =

American jazz musician

James Archibald McLin (June 26, 1908, Brooksville, Florida – December 15, 1983, St. Petersburg, Florida) was an American jazz banjoist and guitarist.

McLin started on piano before picking up banjo and, later, guitar. He played locally in Florida before relocating to New York City in 1928, playing both guitar and banjo in the early 1930s for James P. Johnson, Ward Pinkett, and Roy Eldridge. Later in the decade he recorded with Willie "The Lion" Smith, Buster Bailey, Midge Williams, and Billie Holiday. In the early 1940s he worked with Sidney Bechet, Dave Nelson, and Claude Hopkins, then played trombone and mellophone in a military band while serving in the United States Navy during World War II. After his discharge he worked again with Hopkins and played guitar for The Ink Spots.
