= Mills Blue Rhythm Band =

American big band (1930s)

- The Mills Blue Rhythm Band. From left: George Washington, J. C. Higginbotham, Henry "Red" Allen, Wardell Jones, and Shelton Hemphill.

Background information
- Also known as: Blue Rhythm Band, Blue Ribbon Band, Blue Rhythm Boys, The Blue Racketeers, Earl Jackson's Musical Champions, Earl Jackson and his Orchestra, Duke Wilson and his Ten Blackberries, King Carter's Royal Orchestra, Mills Music Masters, Harlem Hot Shots, Coconut Grove Orchestra
- Origin: New York City, U.S.
- Genres: Jazz; swing
- Years active: 1930–1938
- Labels: Brunswick; Columbia; RCA Victor; Oriole; Perfect; Regal; Romeo; Banner; Melotone; Variety

The Mills Blue Rhythm Band was an American big band active during the 1930s.

== History ==
The band was formed in New York City in 1930 by drummer Willie Lynch as the Blue Rhythm Band, and then briefly operated as the Coconut Grove Orchestra. Irving Mills became its manager in 1931 and it subsequently assumed the name Mills Blue Rhythm Band. Compere Jimmy Ferguson (Baron Lee) replaced Lynch. Another brief leader, reeds player Bingie Madison, left at the time of the final name change. Over its lifetime, the group was known as the "Blue Rhythm Band", "Blue Ribbon Band", "Blue Rhythm Boys", "The Blue Racketeers", "Earl Jackson's Musical Champions", "Earl Jackson and his Orchestra", "Duke Wilson and his Ten Blackberries", "King Carter's Royal Orchestra", "Mills Music Masters", "Harlem Hot Shots". It accompanied Louis Armstrong on some record sides.

The Mills Blue Rhythm Band were based at The Cotton Club in Harlem. They worked steadily through the 1930s deputizing for the orchestra of Duke Ellington and Cab Calloway, often taking their undesirable engagements. Mills managed Ellington and Calloway as well. Edgar Hayes, Eddie Mallory and Dave Nelson all had temporary stints as band leader, until Lucky Millinder permanently took over the role in 1934.

The band recorded 150 sides for labels including Brunswick, Columbia, Victor, the ARC stable of labels (including Oriole, Perfect, Regal, Romeo, Banner, Melotone, Domino), Variety, and Vocalion. Although a few of their records became hits (including "Truckin'" and "Ride, Red, Ride") and the MBRB had a lineup of talented soloists, the group never attained the prominence of their peers. This has been attributed to the lack of a single identifiable leader, and Irving Mills' preference to have the band perform an understudy role.

By 1937, the group was billed as Lucky Millinder and his Orchestra and disbanded in 1938. Millinder joined Bill Doggett's band before reforming it into his own orchestra in 1940.

Irving Mills revived the Mills Blue Rhythm Band name for two recording sessions in 1947, under the guidance of Van Alexander. The only original band member performing at either of the 1947 sessions was trumpeter Charlie Shavers.

== Members ==
- Red Allen – trumpet
- Hayes Alvis – double bass
- Ed Anderson – trumpet
- Harold Arnold – tenor saxophone
- Buster Bailey – clarinet
- Billy Banks
- Danny Barker – guitar
- Alfred Cobbs – trombone
- Carroll Dickerson – violin
- Harry "Sweets" Edison – trumpet
- Joe Garland – tenor saxophone, arrangements
- Edgar Hayes – piano
- Shelton Hemphill – trumpet
- J. C. Higginbotham – trombone
- Alex Hill – piano
- Charlie Holmes – alto saxophone
- Benny James – guitar
- Elmer James – bass
- Wardell Jones – trumpet
- Billy Kyle – piano
- Baron Lee (Jimmy Ferguson)
- Lawrence Lucie – guitar
- Willie Lynch – drums
- Bingie Madison – clarinet, tenor saxophone
- Eddie Mallory – trumpet
- Castor McCord – saxophone
- Ted McCord – saxophone
- Gene Mikell – clarinet, alto saxophone
- Lucky Millinder – bandleader
- Frankie Newton – trumpet
- Lester Nichols – drums
- Wilbur de Paris – trombone
- Charlie Shavers – trumpet
- Tab Smith – alto saxophone
- O'Neil Spencer – drums
- Bob Stephens
- Carl Warwick – trumpet
- George Washington – trombone
- Crawford Wethington – clarinet – alto saxophone – baritone saxophone
- Harry White – trombone
- Ben Williams – tenor saxophone
- Eddie Williams – tenor saxophone
- John Williams – double bass
