= Harry White (trombonist) =

American jazz trombonist (1898–1962)

Harry Alexander "Father" White (June 1, 1898 – August 14, 1962) was an American jazz trombonist.

As a teenager, White played drums, then switched to trombone after moving to Washington, D.C. around 1919. In the 1920s he played with Duke Ellington, Elmer Snowden, and Claude Hopkins, then started a family band called the White Brothers Orchestra in 1925. This ensemble played the mid-Atlantic states for several years.

Late in the 1920s, White played with Luis Russell, then joined the Mills Blue Rhythm Band in 1931. The following year he joined the orchestra of Cab Calloway, working as an arranger and composer in addition to duties on trombone. One of Calloway's trumpeters, Edwin Swayze, overheard White use the term "jitterbug", and wrote a tune called "The Jitterbug" because of it; Calloway's 1934 recording of it brought the term into widespread currency. He returned to play under Russell in 1935 while Russell's band backed Louis Armstrong. He quit playing for part of the 1930s, then later played with Manzie Johnson, Hot Lips Page, Edgar Hayes, and Bud Freeman.
