= O'Neil Spencer =

American singer

William "O'Neil" Spencer (November 25, 1909 – July 24, 1944) was a jazz drummer and singer. He is most known for his work in the John Kirby Sextet.

   According to a Jazz Profiles Blogspot on 8 August 2008 and an interview with legendary jazz drummer Philly Jo Jones (see: Cerra, Steven 5 August 2008. "Jazz Profiles: "The Wonder" of Philly Joe Jones - Part 1". Jazzprofiles.blogspot.com.), "O'Neil" is credited with the invention of the hi-hat in 1942. Prior to 1942, drummers used a "low-hat". A similar configuration with closing cymbals and foot pedal, but only extending about 12 inches off the ground. The higher position of the cymbals allows a drummer to hit the cymbals in an open or closed position for additional sounds during play. The hi-hat has become standard drumset equipment.

He began with work for Al Sears and from 1931 to 1936 he worked with the Mills Blue Rhythm Band. He joined Kirby's group in 1937, but had to leave for a time in 1941 due to tuberculosis. He rejoined in 1942 staying until 1943, but died soon after from the disease.
