= Willie Gant =

American jazz bandleader and pianist (1899–1974)

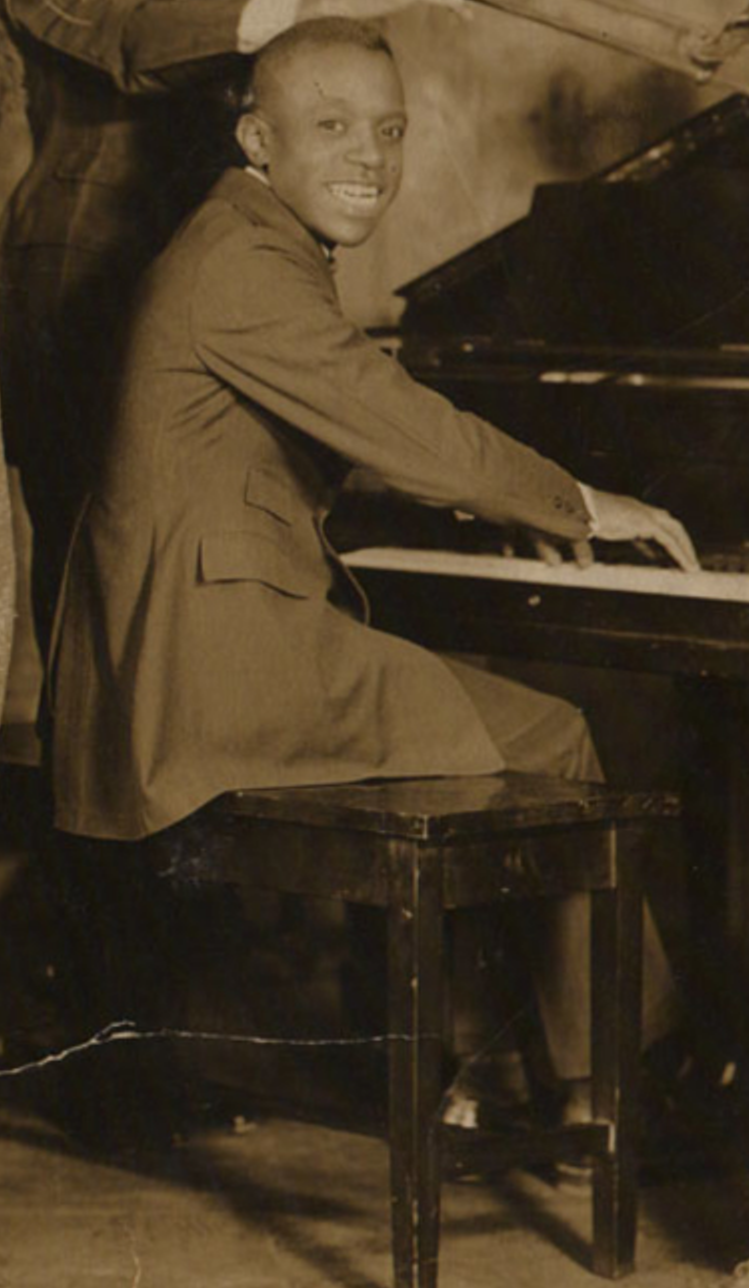
- Jazz pianist Willie Gant in 1921

Background information
- Born: William D. Gant; May 10, 1899
- Origin: New York City
- Died: March 1974 (aged 74) New York City
- Genres: Dixieland, jazz, swing, stride, ragtime
- Occupation: Musician
- Instrument: Piano

Willie "The Tiger" Gant (May 10, 1899 – March 1974) was an American jazz bandleader and pianist.

== History ==
Gant began on piano at age 12, and at 13 he began studying under James P. Johnson. He played in local New York clubs and cafes from age 17. Gant recorded some sides in the 1920s, and after the dissolution of his band the Ramblers, devoted himself almost exclusively to solo piano work. He played in New York at places such as the Hotel Fairfax and Carutti's from the 1930s into the 1960s. In 1968, Dick Wellstood identified Willie Gant as one of the regular pianists who performed at the Tom Tilghman's Hollywood Bar and Grill in Harlem, alongside Marlowe Morris, Billy Taylor, Art Tatum, and Stephen "The Beetle" Henderson.

== Musical groups ==
Although he appears in a photograph with Lillyn Brown & Her Jazzbo Syncopators in 1921, he was not a band member and filled in for an absent piano player for the photo. He formed his own band, the Ramblers, that same year. Over the course of the next six years, Gant's band rivaled Fats Waller in popularity; it also served as early experience for many noted sideman, including Freddie Green, Ward Pinkett, Happy Caldwell, and Manzie Johnson.

== Discography ==
Per the Jazz and Ragtime Records Index

With Eliza Christmas Lee

- "I Ain't Givin' Nothin' Away" (1921)
- "Arkansas Blues" (1921)

With Josie Miles

- "If You Want to Keep Your Daddy Home" (1922)
- "You're Fooling with the Wrong Gal Now" (1922)
- "When I Dream of Old Tennessee Blues" (1922)
- "I Don't Want You (If You Don't Want Me)" (1922)
- "Low Down 'Bama Blues" (1923)

With Lavinia Turner

- "How Many Times?" (1921)
- "Can't Get Lovin' Blues" (1921)
- "A-Wearin' Away the Blues" (1921)
- "Sweet Man of Mine" (1921)
