= Lawrence Lucie =

American jazz guitarist

- Born: December 18, 1907; Emporia, Virginia, U.S.
- Died: August 14, 2009 (aged 101); New York City
- Genres: Jazz
- Occupation: Musician
- Instrument: Guitar

Lawrence Lucie (December 18, 1907 – August 14, 2009) was an American jazz guitarist.

== Early life ==
Lucie was born in Emporia, Virginia. When he was eight years old, he was learning mandolin, violin, and banjo. He moved to New York City in 1927 and attended the Brooklyn Conservatory of Music to study banjo. He studied guitar at Paramount Music Studios, and guitar became his primary instrument.

== Professional career ==
Lucie's professional career began as a temporary substitute for Fred Guy in the Duke Ellington Orchestra in 1931. He spent the next two years playing guitar for Benny Carter, followed by Fletcher Henderson, the Mills Blue Rhythm Band, Lucky Millinder, Coleman Hawkins in 1940, and Louis Armstrong until 1944, recording with all of them except Ellington. He can also be found on record with Red Allen, Putney Dandridge, Billie Holiday, Spike Hughes, Jelly Roll Morton, Big Joe Turner, and Teddy Wilson.

Lucie served in the U.S. Army, then became a member of small groups in contrast to his big band years, and worked often as a studio musician. He spent his career as a rhythm guitarist, seldom taking solos until the 1970s, when he founded Toy Records to issue music performed by him and his wife, Nora Lee King. In the 1980s and 1990s he played in concerts with Panama Francis.

For thirty years, he taught at Borough of Manhattan Community College until 2004. He played solo guitar in clubs until he was 99-years-old. In 2009, his death at the age of 101 ended a career that lasted over seventy-five years. He was the last living musician to have recorded with Jelly Roll Morton.

== Discography ==
=== As leader ===
- Cool and Warm Guitar (Toy, 1975)
- Sophisticated Lady/After Sundown (Toy, 1977)
- This Is It... The Innovator (Toy, 1978)
- Mixed Emotions (Toy, 1979)
- It Was Good...It is Good (Toy, 1982)

=== As sideman ===
- Dollar Brand, African Marketplace (Elektra, 1980)
- Ella Fitzgerald, Newport Jazz Festival Live at Carnegie Hall July 5, 1973 (Columbia, 1973)
- Coleman Hawkins, The Hawk in Flight (RCA Victor, 1955)
- Fletcher Henderson, Swing's the Thing (Decca, 1961)
- Spike Hughes, Spike Hughes and His All American Orchestra (London, 1956)
- Marion Williams, Gospel Now (Cotillion, 1971)
