= Hayes Alvis =

American jazz bassist and tuba player (1907–1972)

- Born: Hayes Julian Alvis; May 1, 1907; Chicago, Illinois, U.S.
- Died: December 29, 1972 (aged 65) New York City, U.S.
- Genre: Jazz
- Occupation: Musician
- Instruments: Double bass; tuba; baritone saxophone
- Years active: 1920s
- Formerly of: Earl Hines; Mills Blue Rhythm Band; Duke Ellington; Sy Oliver

Hayes Julian Alvis (May 1, 1907 – December 29, 1972) was an American jazz bassist and tuba player.

== Career ==
Alvis began on the drums but switched to tuba and double bass after playing with Jelly Roll Morton in 1927–28. He played tuba with Earl Hines from 1928 to 1930, for whom he created arrangements as well.

He moved to New York City in 1931 and played with Jimmie Noone in the Mills Blue Rhythm Band in 1931–34 and 1936. An early double-bass solo of his can be heard on the group's "Rhythm Spasm" (1932). Alvis also occasionally played the baritone saxophone in this ensemble as well as serving as the group's tour manager. From 1935 to 1938, he played with Duke Ellington, working with fellow bassist/tubist Billy Taylor.

After his period with Ellington, Alvis played with Benny Carter, Joe Sullivan, and Louis Armstrong (in whose ensemble he replaced Pops Foster). From 1942 to 1945, he played in an U.S. Army band led by Sy Oliver. After the war, he played with Dave Martin until 1947 and then took a longstanding run as a house musician at the Café Society nightclub in New York City.

In the 1950s, he played in various swing and Dixieland revival groups, including Wilbur de Paris's. In the early 1970s, he played with Jay McShann and Tiny Grimes in a trio.

== Death ==
Hayes Alvis died at his New York City home on December 29, 1972, aged 65.
