= Hollywood Bar and Grill =

Hollywood Bar & Grill
- Interactive map of the Hollywood Bar & Grill area

General information
- Type: Bar and restaurant
- Location: 2268 Seventh Avenue (until 1942); 2263 Seventh Avenue (from 1942), Harlem, Manhattan, New York City, United States
- Coordinates: 40.814°N 73.9442°W
- Opened: Early 20th century
- Owner: Thomas Tilghman Sr. and Sophronia Tilghman

Hollywood Bar & Grill was a bar and restaurant in the Harlem neighborhood of Manhattan in New York City, United States. It operated at 2268 Seventh Avenue before relocating across the street to 2263 Seventh Avenue in 1942.

== History ==
The Hollywood Bar & Grill opened in the early 20th century at 2268 Seventh Avenue. In 1942 it moved to 2263 Seventh Avenue to accommodate a larger clientele. The new premises were described as an "attractive, restful place" offering reasonably priced dining.

The business was owned by Thomas Tilghman Sr. and his wife, Sophronia Tilghman. After Thomas became ill, Sophronia assumed primary responsibility for operating the business with assistance from their son, Tom Jr. Sophronia, a native of Richmond, Virginia, married Thomas in Atlantic City in 1915.

== Culture ==
During the 1930s and early 1940s, the Hollywood Bar & Grill was frequented by musicians and entertainers. Pianists including Marlowe Morris, Billy Taylor, Willie Gant, and Art Tatum performed there, particularly on Monday evenings, which featured piano performances. The bar was located diagonally across from Smalls Paradise.

Jazz writer Orrin Keepnews identified the Hollywood Bar as one of Harlem's after-hours gathering places for musicians, where performers met following nightclub engagements for jam sessions and piano cutting contests. He also wrote that the bar became a regular destination for Art Tatum beginning in 1936. According to proprietor Tom Tilghman, Tatum preferred the establishment because he could navigate it easily despite his impaired vision, and Tilghman recalled that Fats Waller introduced Tatum to the bar.

Thomas Tilghman Sr. was noted for giving Christmas gifts to customers.

== See also ==
- Harlem Renaissance
- Music of New York City
- African Americans in New York City
