= Ram Ramirez =

Puerto Rican born jazz pianist and composer

Roger "Ram" Ramirez (September 15, 1913 – 11 January 1994) was a Puerto Rican jazz pianist and composer. He was a co-composer of the song "Lover Man (Oh, Where Can You Be?)"

== Early life ==
Ramirez was born in San Juan, Puerto Rico on September 15, 1913. He grew up in New York and started playing the piano at a young age.

== Later life and career ==
Ramirez's first professional performances were in the early 1930s. In 1933 he played with Monette Moore, then with Rex Stewart and Sid Catlett in New York. He joined Willie Bryant in 1935, and toured Europe with Bobby Martin in 1937. During the first half of the 1940s Ramirez played with Ella Fitzgerald, Frankie Newton, Charlie Barnet, John Kirby, and Catlett, in addition to leading his own band.

Ramirez wrote "Lover Man (Oh, Where Can You Be?)" in 1942, which became a jazz standard following Billie Holiday's recording of it two years later. He was a freelance into the mid-1950s, when he added electronic organ to his instruments. In 1953 he was in one of Duke Ellington's small groups, as a substitute.

Ramirez again toured Europe in 1968, this time with T-Bone Walker. In 1979 and 1980 he was part of the Harlem Blues and Jazz Band, including for appearances in Germany. He also freelanced after this, and retired for health reasons in 1987. Ramirez was married to Marcy and had a daughter. He died of kidney failure in Queens, New York City on January 11, 1994.

== Discography (selection) ==
- Ram Ramirez: Live in Harlem (Black & Blue)
- Ram Ramirez: "Fine and Mellow" (RCA) (as "Roger Ram")
- Ram Ramirez: "I'll Remember April" (RCA) (as "Roger Ram")
- Putney Dandridge: 1935–1936 (Classics)
- The Duke's Men – Small Groups, Vol. 1 (Columbia, 1934–38)
- Ella Fitzgerald: 1939–1940 (Classics)
- Helen Humes: 1945–1946 (Classics)
- John Kirby: 1945–1946 (Classics)
- Ike Quebec: 1944–1946 (Classics), The Blue Note Swingtets (Blue Note, 1944)
- Rex Stewart: 1934–1946 (Classics)
- Annie Ross & King Pleasure: Sings (OJC, 1952, 1953)
