= Sheldon Harris (music historian) =

American historian (1924–2005)

Sheldon Harris (né Sheldon Hand Harris; 13 August 1924 Cuyahoga County, Ohio — 8 September 2005 Brooklyn) was an American amateur jazz and blues historian and collector. His book, Blues Who's Who, a result of his 20 years of research, details the biographies of 571 singers. It is a recognized reference in the field of blues music. In 1981 it won the Memphis Blues Foundation's W.C. Handy Award and in 1983 won the "Blues Hall of Fame Award" in the classics of blues literature category.

== Sheldon Harris Collection ==
Harris donated his collection to the University of Mississippi. It includes over 1,800 78-rpm discs, 589 pieces of sheet music, photographs, and his research materials. The collection is digitized and available online.

== Books ==
- 1986: Clyde E. B. Bernhardt, Sheldon Harris, I Remember: Eighty Years of Black Entertainment, Big Bands, and the Blues, 1986, University of Pennsylvania Press, ISBN 9780812212235
- 1979: Sheldon Harris, Blues Who's Who: A Biographical Dictionary of Blues Singers, Arlington House, ISBN 0870004255
