= Ollie Shepard (blues pianist) =

American blues pianist, vocalist and songwriter (1909–1960)

Ollie Shepard (né Oliver Shepard; born July 1909, Oberlin, Louisiana, United States – 1960) was an American blues pianist, vocalist, and songwriter.

== Career ==
From about 1954 to about 1963, Shepard performed at Jerry's Restaurant & Cocktail Lounge in Oneonta, New York, at 15 Dietz Street, in the Walnut Street Historic District. The restaurant was owned by Joseph G. ("Jerry") Monser (1926–1975), who opened it on August 5, 1954. The building was demolished in July 1970 to make way for a parking lot. Mark Bresee, et al., purchased the property from Robert W. Melmer, his father, John J. Melmer, and his brother, John E. Melmer.

Poet and academician Richard George Frost (born 1929) who, for a stint, had played drums with Shepard in a lounge in Oneonta described him as follows:

Ollie, who had once been a house pianist for Decca Records, was a tyrant. The arrogant cuss seemed determined to derange me. He played in a fast, galloping blues-based format that often threw me. When he believed I had lagged or faltered, he would make unpleasant faces and groan loudly at his honky drummer.

== Selected discography ==
Original releases

- Ollie Shepard and His Kentucky Boys, Decca Records

Ollie Shepard (vocalist), Chu Berry (tenor sax), Sammy Price (piano), (unknown) (drums)

1. Decca 7400
  Side X – C91348: "Honey Bee" (1937)
  Side X – C91350: "Sweetheart Land" (1937)
2. Decca 7408
  Side X – C91349: "No One To Call You Dear" (1937)
  Side X – C91347: "She Walks Like A Kangaroo" (1937)
3. Decca 7463
  Side X – 63514-A: "What's Your Guess?" (1938)
  Side X – 63510-A: "Good Woman" (1938)
4. Decca 7665
  Side X – 65975-A: "Baby It's My Time Now" (1939)
  Side X – 65973-A: "King of All Evil"
5. Decca 7480
  Side X – 63513-A: "Biscuit Rolling Time" (1938)
  Side X – 63515-B: "Hope You Haven't Forgotten Me" (1938)
6. Decca 7508
  Side X – 63796-A: "Frankenstein Blues" (1938)
  Side X – 63795-A: "Little Pigmeat" (1938)
7. Decca 7435
  Side X – 63512-A: "Drunk Again" (1938)
  Side X – 63507-A: "One Woman Blues" (1938)
8. Decca 7651
  Side X – 65971-A: "Don't You Know?" (1939)
  Side X – 65974-A: "Lil Liza Jane" (1939)
9. Decca 7629
  Side A – 65422-A: "Sweetest Thing Born"
  Recorded in New York City April 18, 1939
  Side B – 65972-A: "Jelly Roll"
  Recorded in New York City June 17, 1939
  OCLC 182786905
10. Decca 7602
  Side A – 65425-A: "Sugar Woman Blues" (1939)
  Side B – 65423-A: "Shepard Blues" ("Pig Latin Blues") (1939)
11. Decca 7541
  Side A – 63511-A: "Pee Wee, Pee Wee" (1938)
  Side B – 63516-A: "At Your Mercy" (1938)
12. Decca 7493
  Side A – 63793-A: "Solid Jack" (1938)
  OCLC 925968632
  Side B – 63794-A: "This Place Is Leaping" (1938)
13. Decca 7585
  Side A – 65420-A: "New Low Down Dirty Shame"
  Recorded in New York City April 18, 1939
  OCLC 182782649, 79235868
  Side B – 65421-A: "The Numbers Blues"
  OCLC 79690224
14. Decca 7613
  Side A – 65427-A: "My Dripping Blood Blues"
  Recorded in New York City April 18, 1939
  OCLC 80099579
  Side B – 65424-A: "Outdoor Blues"
  (add Lonnie Johnson, guitar)
  Recorded in New York City April 18, 1939
15. Decca 7639
  Side A – 65428-A: "Blues 'bout My Gal"
  Recorded in New York City April 18, 1939
  OCLC 182787821, 82887536
  Side B – 65970-A: "Oh Maria"
  Recorded in New York City July 17, 1939
16. Decca 7448
  Side A – 63509-A: "S-B-A Blues"
  Recorded in New York City March 31, 1938
  OCLC 182721146
  Side B – 63508-A: "Brown Skin Woman"
  Recorded in New York City March 31, 1938
  OCLC 79232355
17. Decca 7716
  Side A – 65426-A: "Hell Is So Low Down" (1939)
  Side B – 67083-A: "Octavia Blues" (1940)
18. Decca 7805
  Side A: "You Got Me Wandering" (1940)
  Side B – 67084-A: "I'm Stepping Out Tonight" (1940)
19. Decca 7761
  Side X – 67082-A: "Jitterbugs Broke Down" (1940)
  Side X – 65970-A: "Oh Maria" (1940)
- Ollie Shepard

Ollie Shepard (vocalist, piano), accompanied by Ted McCord (clarinet, tenor sax), George Francis (guitar), Johnny Wells (drums), unknown female (vocal 1)

Recorded in New York City, May 2, 1941

20. Okeh 06277
  Side A – 30392-1: "Cool Kind Papa"
  Side B – 30394-1: "Throw This Dog A Bone"
21. Okeh 06409
  Side A – 30397-1: "Army Camp Blues"
  Side B – 30391-1: "Hard Times Is On Me"
22. Okeh 06533
  Side A – 30396-1: "Pay Day Blues"
  Side B – 30393-1: "True Love Blues"
- Ollie Shepard with Hot Lips Page & His Orchestra

Ollie Shepard (vocalist, piano), accompanied by Hot Lips Page (trumpet), Alfred Cobbs (trombone), Vincent Bey (alto and baritone sax), Buddy Tate (tenor sax), Carl "Flat Top" Wilson (bass), Clay Burt (drums)

Recorded in New York City, November 1, 1950

23. Okeh 6840
  Side A – CO44587: "Baby Blues"
  Side B – CO44588: "Don't Come Knockin' Upon My Door"

Curatorial discography (re-issues and compilations)

- Ollie Shepard, Complete Recorded Works, Document Records (1996)

Vol. 1; 28 October 1937 to 18 April 1939; OCLC 697957392
Vol. 2; 18 April 1939 to 2 May 1941; OCLC 248203127

== Selected compositions ==
- "It's A Low Down Dirty Shame" (1938)

State Street Music Pub. Co.
OCLC 497864690

- "Sweetheart Land" (1938)

State Street Music Pub. Co.

- "I'm Going Back To Kokomo" (1943)

Ollie Shephard (sic) (w&m)
Charling Music Corp.

- "Exactly What I Need" (1943)

Ollie Shephard (sic) (w&m)
Charling Music Corp.

- "Good Old Tennessee" (1944)

Ollie Shepard (w&m)

- "Take Everything There Is" ("But Leave Me You") (1944)

Ollie Shepard (w&m)

- "It's A Low Down Dirty Shame" (1946)
- "Do You Wonder Why?" (1953)

Ollie Shepard (w&m)

- "Tee Nay" (1956)

Ollie Shepard (w&m)
Charles K. Harris Music Pub. Co., Inc.

- "Restless As The River" (1956)

Ollie Shepard & Sammy Gallop (w&m)
Charles K. Harris Music Pub. Co., Inc.

- "Stepping Out" (1956)

Ollie Shepard (w&m)
Peer International Corp.

- "That's What True Love Can Do" (1956)

Ollie Shepard (w&m)
Peer International Corp.

- "I'll Never Make You Blue" (1957)

OCLC 498264490

- "Hot Dawg" (1957)

Ollie Shepard (w&m)
Desired Music, Inc.

- "Now I Know" (1959)

Ollie Shepard (w&m)
Cincinnati: Jay & Cee Music Corp.
OCLC 498825119

- "If You Want Me To" (1960)

Ollie Shepard (w&m)

- "Sweetheart" (1960)
- "You Care" (1960)

OCLC 498746459

- "Jitterbugs Broke It Down" (1967)

Ollie Shepard (w&m)

- "My Babe Is Gone" (1957)
- "Sweetie Pie" (1957)
- "Regardless" (1957)
- "You Better Believe It" (1957)
