= Wilbur de Paris =

American jazz trombonist and bandleader (1900–1973)

Wilbur De Paris
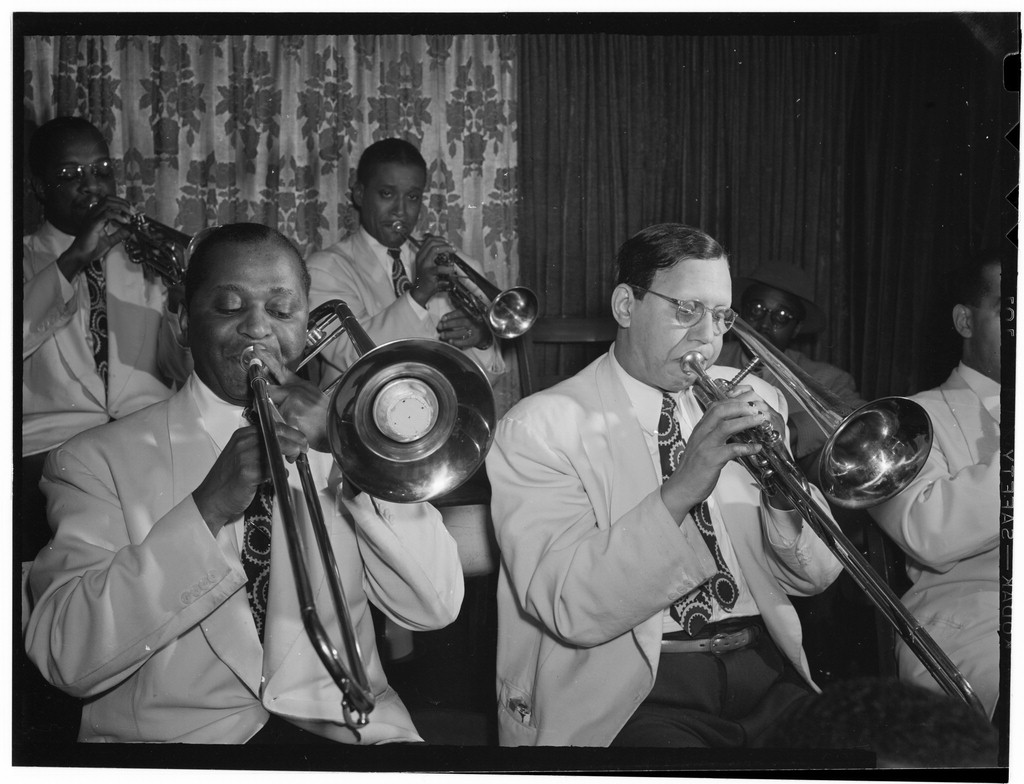
- Wilbur De Paris (left) and Claude Jones at the Aquarium in New York in 1946

Background information
- Born: January 11, 1900; Crawfordsville, Indiana, U.S.
- Died: January 3, 1973 (aged 72) New York, New York, U.S.
- Genres: Dixieland, swing
- Occupations: Trombonist, band leader
- Instrument: Trombone
- Years active: 1912–1972

Wilbur de Paris (January 11, 1900 – January 3, 1973) was a trombone player and band leader known for mixing Dixieland jazz with swing.

== Career ==
Wilbur de Paris was born January 11, 1900, in Crawfordsville, Indiana. His father, Sidney de Paris Sr., was a musician and taught him and his brother Sidney how to play music. He played alto saxophone in his father's circus band.

In 1919, de Paris began his career in Philadelphia in a small band. He visited New Orleans in 1922 and worked with Louis Armstrong and Armand J. Piron. Throughout the 1920s, he worked in Philadelphia and New York, including as band leader. During this time he permanently switched from saxophone to trombone. Among the musicians de Paris worked with were Stuff Smith, Dave Nelson, Noble Sissle (with whom he toured Europe), and Edgar Hayes.

De Paris toured with Teddy Hill's orchestra from 1936 to 1937 and recorded with the Mills Blue Rhythm Band. Again he joined Louis Armstrong, playing with him from the end of 1937 until the end of the decade.

While De Paris remained an obscure figure during this era, his brother Sidney achieved fame as a trumpet soloist. In 1944, the brothers recorded together for the first time as The DeParis Brothers for Commodore Records, producing four songs. He briefly toured with Ella Fitzgerald and Roy Eldridge before leading his own small band.

In late 1945, de Paris broke up his group to join Duke Ellington with whom he stayed until 1947.

Sponsored by the U.S. State Department, de Paris toured Africa in 1957 as part of the President's International Program for Cultural Relations.

His music is present in the films of Woody Allen, including "In a Persian Market" in The Curse of the Jade Scorpion.

== Death ==
De Paris died in Beekman Downtown Hospital, New York on 3 January 1973. He was survived by two sons and two daughters.
