= Bernard Wolfe =

American writer (1915–1985)

Bernard Wolfe (New Haven, Connecticut, August 28, 1915 – Calabasas, California, October 27, 1985) was an American writer.

== Biography ==
Wolfe entered Yale University at 16 and graduated in 1935 with a degree in psychology. He then enrolled for a few months’ additional study at Yale's Graduate Division of General Studies. In 1936 he taught at Bryn Mawr’s summer College of Women Trade Unionists. He moved to New York and between 1936 and 1938 contributed to Trotskyist journals, such as The Militant and The New International.

In New York City the American Committee for the Defense of Leon Trotsky was looking for an English-speaking secretary to assist Trotsky in Mexico. Wolfe’s friend Arthur Mizener, a professor at Yale, provided funds, and in 1937 Wolfe travelled to Mexico, where he worked for eight months as Trotsky’s bodyguard and secretary, acting as the liaison between Trotsky and the John Dewey Commission investigation into the Moscow Trials.

Between 1937 and 1939 Wolfe occasionally worked in the Merchant Marines. In 1939 he moved to Greenwich Village, where he eventually drifted away from the Trotskyist movement and met Anaïs Nin and Henry Miller. Through them he found employment writing pornographic novels (11 in 11 months) for the private collection of Roy Melisander Johnson, an Oklahoma oil millionaire. He credited his pornographic output with teaching him to write to specified lengths while facing deadlines: "I acquired the work discipline of a professional writer, capable of a solid daily output." In 1941 he was the assistant night editor for Paramount Newsreel for a few weeks. In 1943 and 1944 he wrote war-related science articles for Popular Science Monthly and Mechanix Illustrated. He eventually became the editor of the latter magazine.

In 1946 he collaborated with the jazz musician Mezz Mezzrow in writing Mezzrow's autobiography, Really the Blues. The book was a popular success, introducing the mass audience to aspects of black culture. It received a flattering notice in Billy Rose's syndicated column in October of that year and in 1947 Wolfe was hired as ghost writer for Billy Rose’s syndicated column. Wolfe worked on a further study of "negro" culture in America, which was never published, but excerpts were published in American magazines in 1949 and 1950, translated for Jean-Paul Sartre’s Les Temps modernes and quoted by Frantz Fanon.

In 1950 he had psychoanalysis with Dr. Edmund Bergler. Wolfe would return in his fiction to Bergler’s idea of "psychic masochism". Bergler's ideas of frigidity and the importance of the vaginal orgasm recur in Wolfe's presentation of female sexuality.

In 1951 he published a short story, "Self-Portrait", in Galaxy. Its themes of cybernetics, artificial limbs and prostheses, computerised warfare, masochism and voluntary amputeeism would all be expanded upon in his first published novel, Limbo (1952). Because the novel was set in the then-distant future of 1990, the original British edition is entitled Limbo '90. The publisher claimed that Wolfe had written "the first book of science-fiction to project the present-day concept of 'cybernetics' to its logical conclusion". David Pringle selected Limbo for inclusion in his book Science Fiction: The 100 Best Novels. J. G. Ballard praised Wolfe's "lucid intelligence" and claimed Limbo helped encourage him to start writing fiction. Boucher and McComas, however, received the novel poorly, calling it "pretentious hodgepodge" and describing its theme as "a symbolically interesting idea . . . never developed with consistent or convincing details." P. Schuyler Miller gave Limbo a mixed review, describing it as a "colossus of a novel" while faulting its "endless talk." During the 90's, Katherine Hayles revisited Wolfe's novel for the study of the concept of posthuman, dedicating chapter five of her book to analyse and comment the influence of cybernetics in Wolfe's thought. Hayles however highlights some misogynist positions that can be perceived in Limbo's reading. More recently, analysis of Limbo has proven slightly more sympathetic to the novel, citing its relevance to the debate around computer control and the influence of machines on daily life; however, criticisms around the novel's contentious politics and misogyny remain.

His novel The Late Risers, Their Masquerade (1954), the title of which plays on Herman Melville’s The Confidence-man: His Masquerade, is about the hustlers, actors and drug dealers who people late-night New York City. In 1955 and 1956 he wrote a number of television plays, some of which drew upon his experiences with Trotsky and as a ghost writer. His 1956 teleplay Five Who Shook the Mighty, a dramatization of the trial of five Romanians who had captured the Romanian Communist legation in Switzerland, was the subject of protests by the Romanian embassy but was given a special award by the Crusade for Freedom. He wrote a monthly column in 1957 for Nugget, a men's magazine. His third novel, In Deep (1957), is a thriller featuring espionage, socialist hipsters and decades-old Communist vendettas played out in Cuba.

The Great Prince Died (later republished as Trotsky Dead) (1959) was a roman a clef about the events surrounding the assassination of Trotsky (called Victor Rostov in the novel). The book was well received by critics and reviewers, though many expressed doubts about the mixture of fact and fiction in the book. Trotskyites were highly critical of the book, particularly of Wolfe's theme that Trotsky's guilt about the Kronstadt rebellion was transformed into a masochistic death wish. A partial dramatization of The Great Prince Died on Turnley Walker's 1959 book program First Meeting was instrumental in bringing Wolfe to live in California. The Magic of Their Singing (1961) is another novel about New York City's counterculture, as university graduate Hoyt Fairliss explores the world of the beats and nonconformists.

In 1960 he began publishing stories in Playboy magazine, which paid him a retainer for a first option on his short work. In 1961 it was announced that Wolfe was writing an (unproduced) screenplay for Tony Curtis about Hugh Hefner and Playboy magazine. In 1963 it was announced that Wolfe was writing the (unproduced) screenplay adaptation of Henry Miller's Tropic of Cancer. Come On Out, Daddy was published in 1963, an expansion of bitter stories recently published in Playboy and Cavalier (as Andrew Foxe) about Gordon Rengs, a novelist and screenwriter, and his tawdry adventures in Hollywood. A short story collection, Move Up, Dress Up, Drink Up, Burn Up was published in 1968. In the late 1960s he taught at UCLA. Harlan Ellison solicited two stories ("The Girl with Rapid Eye Movements", about Gordon Rengs and the generation gap) to appear in his 1972 science fiction anthology, Again, Dangerous Visions. Wolfe wrote an autobiography, Memoirs of a Not Altogether Shy Pornographer (1972), the title of which alludes to Kenneth Patchen’s Memoirs of a Shy Pornographer. His novel Logan’s Gone (1974), a return to the character of Gordon Rengs, features contemporary politics with campus protests and Vietnam veterans.

In 1974 Wolfe signed a seven-book contract with a recently formed Los Angeles publisher, Wollstonecraft Inc. Unfortunately the publisher suffered financial troubles, and Wolfe published no books after this. It remains uncertain whether several books may or may not have been printed, particularly because of variant titles used in a 1974 Publishers Weekly article. The Great Prince Died was republished with emendations as Trotsky Dead. A novel entitled Full Disclosure and advertised to appear in 1975 as an “international suspense novel highlighting moral conflicts among the men who hold the keys to government secrets” may be the Watergate–inspired novel Lies, whose publication corresponds with Wollstonecraft's 1975 schedule, about an undercover government agent whose marriage falters as does his faith in the work he does. Julie: The Life and Times of John Garfield (or Body and Soul: The Life and Death of John Garfield), a biography of the actor by Wolfe and Edward Medard was advertised in several trade journals throughout 1975 and 1977 but its publication is uncertain. A novel, Blood Money, and a collection of essays and reviews, Men Not Quite Without Women, were never published.

In 1975 he collaborated with Michael Blankfort on a play, Karl and Arthur, about Karl Marx and Arthur Rimbaud.

Throughout the 1970s articles and profiles noted a lengthy novel that Wolfe was writing about the Delano grape strike. In 1969 Wolfe had conducted a series of UCLA lectures on the proletarian novel, and the Delano grape strike had been employed as background in several of the stories in Move Up, Dress Up, Drink Up, Burn Up.

Wolfe married the actress Dolores Michaels in Los Angeles on June 30, 1960. The marriage was her second and his first. The remained married until his death on October 27, 1985, and his death certificate lists Michaels as spouse at death. They had twin daughters, Jordan M. and Miranda I., born in Los Angeles on July 23, 1970.

Wolfe died of a heart attack at the Motion Picture and Television Hospital.

== Selected works ==
=== Non-fiction ===
- How to Get a Job in the Aircraft Industry (1943)
- Plastics: What Everyone Should Know (1945) (ghost written by Raymond Rosenthal)
- Really the Blues, with Mezz Mezzrow (1946)
- Hypnotism Comes of Age (1949) (ghost written by Raymond Rosenthal)

=== Fiction ===
==== Novels ====
- Limbo (1952) (originally published in the UK as Limbo '90)
- The Late Risers, Their Masquerade (1954) (reprinted as Everything Happens at Night)
- In Deep (1957)
- The Great Prince Died (reprinted in revised form as Trotsky Dead) (1959)
- The Magic of Their Singing (1961)
- Come On Out, Daddy (1963)
- Logan's Gone (1974)
- Lies (1975)

=== Short fiction ===
- "Self Portrait", Galaxy Science Fiction 1951
- "The Never Ending Penny", Playboy Magazine, 1960
- "Come Out, Daddy", Playboy Magazine 1961
- "Marcianna and the Natural Carpaine in Papaya", Playboy Magazine 1961
- "Anthony from Afar", Playboy Magazine 1962
- "The Going Price For Adoration". Playboy Magazine 1963
- "The Dot and Dash Bird", Playboy Magazine 1964
- "Sue Me Rich", Playboy Magazine 1964
- “How Simon Got His Bureau”, Playboy Magazine 1966
- "The Roach Powder in the Maple Walnut", Playboy Magazine 1966
- "The Hot Sauces of Magda", Playboy Magazine 1968
- "One I Forgot", Playboy Magazine 1968
- "The Bisquit Position", Again Dangerous Visions anthology 1972
- "The Girl With Rapid Eye Movements", Again Dangerous Visions anthology 1972

==== Note ====
Likely only a partial list.

==== Collections ====
- Move Up, Dress Up, Drink Up, Burn Up, 1968

=== Translations ===
- The Plot (Všeobecné spiknutí) by Egon Hostovský, translated from Czech with by Alice Backer, Doubleday, Garden City, N.Y. 1961

=== Teleplays ===
- "The Assassin" (Philco-Goodyear Television Playhouse, 20 February 1955) (inspired by the murder of Trotsky)
- "The Ghost Writer" (Philco-Goodyear Television Playhouse 29 May 1955) (a political speech writer despises his work)
- "The Outsiders" (Philco-Goodyear Television Playhouse, 18 September 1955)
- "Hooked" (Justice, 15 January 1956)
- "Five Who Shook the Mighty" (Armstrong Circle Theatre, 20 March 1956)
- "Pattern of Lies" (Justice, 25 March 1956)

=== Selected non-fiction ===
- "Floating Fashions" (with Raymond Rosenthal, Cosmopolitan, March 1947).
- "Uncle Remus and the Malevolent Rabbit" (Commentary, July 1949)
- "Ecstatic in Blackface: The Negro as a Song-and-Dance Man" (Modern Review, January 1950)
- "War Bonds: More Delusions of Security" (as Christopher Bliss, The American Mercury, April 1951)
- "Are Taxes Making Liars of Us All?" (as Christopher Bliss, The American Mercury, March 1952)
- "Angry at What?" (The Nation, 1 November 1958)
- "The Man Who Murdered Trotsky" (Coronet, July 1959)
- "The 'Darks' Against the 'Lights'" (Esquire, April 1960)
- "Manners and Morals on the Sunset Strip" (Esquire, August 1961)
- "Swimming in Red Ink" (Playboy, July 1964)
- Interview with Henry Miller (Playboy, September 1964)
- "A Pair of Jokers and an Ace" (Sunday Herald Tribune, 25 July 1965).
- "The Man Called I-l-l-y-a" (The New York Times, October 24, 1965)
- "The Step After Muscle" (Cosmopolitan, February 1966).
- "30 Years After Stalin's Great Purge" (The New York Times, September 18, 1966)
- "The Trouble with Harry" (World Journal Tribune, 26 March 1967).
- "The 10 Percenters Of Hollywood" (The New York Times, June 18, 1967)
- "Our Generation Gap: Dialogue with the Mutant Young" (Los Angeles Times, 6 August 1967)
- "The Real-Life Death of Jim Morrison" (Esquire, June 1972)
- "Dearth in the Evening" (Works in Progress #7, 1972)
- "Swiftie the Magician: Rendering the Fad of the Camelot Myth" (Los Angeles Times, 22 September 1974)
- Review of ‘The Electronic Battlefield’ by Paul Dickson (Books West Magazine, Volume 1 #2, 1976)
