= Bingie Madison =

American jazz clarinetist and tenor saxophonist (1901–1978)

- Born: October 12, 1901
- Origin: Des Moines, Iowa, United States
- Died: 1978 (aged 76–77)
- Genres: Jazz
- Occupation: Instrumentalist
- Instruments: Clarinet, tenor saxophone, piano

Bingie Madison (October 12, 1901 – July 1978) was an American jazz clarinetist and tenor saxophonist.

Madison began his career as a pianist, based in Des Moines, Iowa, and then touring Canada and California in 1921. He played with Bobby Brown (1922–25) and Bernie Davis in the 1920s as a pianist, then switched to reeds permanently, playing with Cliff Jackson, Lew Henry, Elmer Snowden, Sam Wooding, Lucky Millinder, and Billy Fowler in the late 1920s and early 1930s. He briefly led a group at the Broadway Danceland in 1930, but left when it was renamed the Mills Blue Rhythm Band the following year, In 1932, he joined Luis Russell's orchestra, remaining there until 1940 (including during its period as Louis Armstrong's backing band). In the 1940s, he played with Edgar Hayes, Ovie Alston, Alberto Socarras, and Hank Duncan. Madison led his own groups into the 1960s but never recorded a session as a leader, although there are a handful of sides fronted by Clarence Williams (recorded in October 1930) that used Madison's Orchestra.
