= Vernon Andrade =

Panamanian-American jazz bassist and bandleader (1902–1966)

Vernon Andrade (April 24, 1902, Panama – February 8, 1966, New York City) was an American jazz bandleader active primarily in New York City in the 1920s and 1930s.

Andrade played violin as a teenager and moved to New York in the early 1920s, holding a position in Deacon Johnson's orchestra. He picked up double-bass in 1923 and became a bandleader around the same time. He married Charlotte Cooper and moved to a brownstone in the Bedford Stuyvesant section of Brooklyn. Oddly enough he and Carmen McRae were neighbors and in-laws. He held a regular gig at the Renaissance Casino and also worked the Alhambra Ballroom in Harlem, which featured high-level dancing. Frankie Manning was among Andrade's admirers. He remained at the Renaissance until 1938; members of his band included Pete Briggs, Ernest Hill, and Zutty Singleton. Helen Humes recorded with Andrade's band on Okeh Records, but other than this, Andrade recorded little in his career, and was largely forgotten as a result. Nevertheless, his style of arrangements was an influence on bandleaders like Fletcher Henderson and Chick Webb. Andrade spent the later years of his life teaching piano and violin.
