= Kustbandet =

Swedish jazz orchestra (founded 1962)

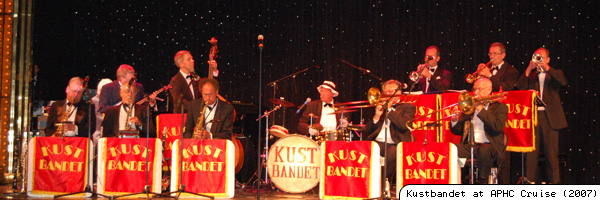

Kustbandet is a Swedish jazz orchestra founded as a school band in Stockholm in 1962 by Christer Ekhé (né Jansson) and Kenneth Arnström. Originally named the Southside Kneewarmers, it played traditional New Orleans jazz and later big band.

Up to the mid-1970s Arnström was the musical leader of Kustbandet and no written music was used. In the late 70's Bent Persson joined the orchestra introducing his own charts and transcriptions from vintage recordings.

Kustbandet perform regularly at concerts, dances and festivals and have toured extensively in Europe, Asia, Australia and The USA. Highlights have been three Nobel Prize Galas, Prairie Home Companion radio shows and New Orleans Jazz and Heritage Festivals.

Kustbandet was formed in the wake of the "jazz war" between traditionalists and modernists in the early 1960s. With time these labels have become redundant, as jazz styles have become more homogeneous. This is also reflected within the orchestra nowadays moving freely between the early jazz styles. Kustbandet's concerts are labeled: "From Ragtime to Swing" presenting blues, ragtime, boogie woogie, Dixieland, swing, gospel, New Orleans brass band-style. The band has recorded more than 20 albums (LP, EP and CD), mainly for the labels Kenneth Records, Stomp Off, Circle Records and Sittel.

In 1987 trombonist Jens "Jesse" Lindgren took over the leadership of the band.
