= Tommy Benford =

American drummer

- Born: Thomas Benford; April 19, 1905; Charleston, West Virginia
- Died: March 24, 1994 (aged 88) Mount Vernon, New York
- Genres: Jazz
- Instrument: Drum kit
- Formerly of: Jelly Roll Morton

Thomas Benford (April 19, 1905 – March 24, 1994) was an American jazz drummer.

== Biography ==
Tommy Benford was born in Charleston, West Virginia. He and his older brother, tuba player Bill Benford, were both orphans who studied music at the Jenkins Orphanage in Charleston, South Carolina. He started playing in an orphanage band and continued with the drums for the next 60 years. He went on tour with the school band, traveling with them to England in 1914.

In 1920, he was working with the Green River Minstrel Show. Benford recorded with Jelly Roll Morton in 1928 and 1930. He also played with Duke Ellington, Fats Waller and Eddie South. From 1932 till 1941 Benford lived in Europe, where in 1937 he participated in one of the most memorable recording sessions ever in Paris, with Coleman Hawkins, Benny Carter, Django Reinhardt and Stéphane Grappelli.

Benford died on March 24, 1994, at Mount Vernon Hospital in Mount Vernon, New York.
