= Tommy Ladnier =

American jazz trumpeter (1900–1939)

- Ladnier, seated at left

Background information
- Born: Thomas James Ladnier; May 28, 1900; Mandeville, Louisiana, U.S.
- Died: June 4, 1939 (aged 39) Harlem, Manhattan, New York
- Genre: Jazz
- Instrument: Trumpet
- Years active: 1921–1939
- Formerly of: Mezz Mezzrow

Thomas James Ladnier (May 28, 1900 – June 4, 1939) was an American jazz trumpeter. Hugues Panassié – an influential French critic, jazz historian, and renowned exponent of New Orleans jazz – rated Ladnier, sometime on or before 1956, second only to Louis Armstrong.

== Early years ==
Ladnier was born in Mandeville, Louisiana – located on the north shore of Lake Pontchartrain, with New Orleans on the opposite shore. Beginning 1914, Ladnier performed in Mandeville's Independence Band at the Dew Drop Dance Hall, led by clarinetist Isidore Frick (né Isidore Fritz; 1890–1940). Trumpeter Bunk Johnson sometimes played with this band and gave young Ladnier lessons. Other members of the band included Louis Fritz (trombone); Joe Fritz (bass); Klebert Cagnolatti (drums) – older brother of trumpeter Cag Cagnolatti (1911–1983); Claybear (sax); Leon Laurent (violin); Buddy Petit (1890–1931) (cornet); Lucien Fritz (drums), Edmond Hall (1901–1967) (clarinet).

In 1917, Ladnier moved with his mother to Chicago and worked in the stock yards.

== Early career ==
Ladnier – on February 1, 1920, in Chicago – married Daisy Mathews (née Hazel B. Mathews; 1902–1979). Around 1921, he became a professional musician. Ladnier played for some time in St. Louis with Charlie Creath. Beginning in 1923, he played in Chicago and made many recordings for Paramount Records with pianist Lovie Austin, accompanying blues singers Ma Rainey, Ida Cox, and Alberta Hunter. For some time, Ladnier played with his inspiration, King Oliver. He emulated Oliver's freak style on the solo in "Play that Thing" with Ollie Power's Harmony Syncopators in September 1923. On March 13, 1923, in Chicago, Ladnier's mother, Willie Ladnier (née Willie Williams; abt. 1879–1923) died from a gun shot at a party quarrel.

== Career ==
Ladnier joined pianist Sam Wooding in 1925 for an extensive tour (Germany, Sweden, Denmark, Spain, and Russia).

This orchestra recorded in Berlin. He returned to New York and became the hot soloist for the Fletcher Henderson orchestra from 1926–1927. He returned to the Sam Wooding Orchestra for another tour (Germany, Austria, Turkey, Switzerland, Italy, and France), then left in January 1929 to work freelance in Paris. A short tour with dancer Harry Fleming brought him to Spain, where he met dancer Louis Douglas and joined him shortly in November 1929 in Paris, acting as orchestra leader. He again free-lanced in Paris until summer 1930 when he joined the Noble Sissle dance band, performing in Paris and London.

He returned to U.S. at the end of 1930 and stayed with Sissle until January 1932. The Sissle orchestra made some recordings in London and New York. Back in America in 1932, Ladnier and Sidney Bechet formed the New Orleans Feetwarmers. During the Depression, they tried to run a tailor shop in Harlem, but neither was interested in business. Ladnier left New York and played in the east, sometimes giving trumpet lessons. For a year, he lived in Stamford, Connecticut.

In 1938, Hugues Panassié, a French critic and record producer who met Ladnier in Paris in 1930, visited New York. He found Ladnier and recorded the Panassié Sessions with Sidney Bechet and Mezz Mezzrow. Ladnier and Bechet participated in the first From Spirituals to Swing concert arranged by John Hammond in December 1938.

Ladnier's last studio recording was on February 1, 1939, in New York as a sideman with singer Rosetta Crawford (de) accompanied by James P. Johnson's Hep Cats (Decca 7584). With Johnson (1894–1955) on piano, his sidemen were Teddy Bunn (1909–1978) (guitar); Elmer James (1910–1954) (double bass); and Zutty Singleton (1898–1975) (drums).

== Death ==
At age 39, Ladnier, died unexpectedly of a heart attack June 4, 1939, while staying at Mezz Mezzrow's apartment at 1 West 126th Street – a six-story, 48-unit residential building in the Harlem neighborhood of Manhattan. It fell upon Mezzrow to take care of Ladnier's belongings and bury him. The memorial service was on Friday, June 9, 1939. Ladnier was buried at Frederick Douglass Memorial Park, Staten Island, an African American cemetery. The first burials there were in 1935. Ladnier's grave is No. 58, range 13, Section H. Despite efforts by Mezzrow and friends, the grave remained unmarked for nearly 69 years. Then, grave marker – 30-centimetre (12 in) square, 13-millimetre (0.51 in) thick – was placed on Ladnier's grave. It was carved from Nero Granite with no grain structure and is attached to a concrete base. The marker was engraved by Bob Sprauge and was placed on site by Bob Lang.
