= Bill Benford =

American jazz musician

- Born: c. 1902; Charleston, West Virginia
- Occupation: jazz musician
- Relatives: Tommy Benford (brother)

Bill Benford (c. 1902 – before 1994) was an American jazz double-bassist and tubist. He was born in Charleston, West Virginia.

Benford was the brother of drummer Tommy Benford. He, like his brother, was a member of the Jenkins Orphanage band in South Carolina as a child, touring with the band in 1915 in the United States and Europe. While Tommy worked out of Europe for much of this time, Bill worked in America, playing with Bubber Miley, Marie Lucas, Elmer Snowden, the Gulf Coast Seven, the Plantation Orchestra, Thomas Morris & His Seven Hot Babies, Ethel Waters, Willie "The Lion" Smith, and Jelly Roll Morton. His last recordings date from circa 1930.
