= Happy Caldwell =

- Born: Albert W. Caldwell; July 25, 1903; Chicago, Illinois, United States
- Died: December 29, 1978 (aged 75) New York City, United States
- Genres: Jazz
- Occupation: Instrumentalist
- Instruments: Clarinet, tenor saxophone
- Years active: 1918-1978

Albert W. "Happy" Caldwell (sometimes incorrectly spelled Cauldwell) (July 25, 1903 in Chicago – December 29, 1978 in New York City) was an American jazz clarinetist and tenor saxophonist.

Caldwell began on clarinet at age 16, playing in the Eighth Illinois Regimental Band and soon after in an Army band. He studied to be a pharmacist but eventually gave up his medicinal studies for jazz.

He worked with Bernie Young early in the 1920s in Chicago, where he recorded for the first time in 1923. Around this time he also began doubling on tenor saxophone. In the middle of the 1920s he played with Mamie Smith's Jazz Hounds, Bobby Brown's Syncopaters, Elmer Snowden, Billy Fowler, Thomas Morris, Willie Gant, and Cliff Jackson. In 1929, he recorded with Louis Armstrong.

In the 1930s, Caldwell played with Vernon Andrade, Tiny Bradshaw, and Louis Metcalfe, and led his own band, the Happy Pals, in the middle of the decade. He played at Minton's in New York City for a short time, then moved to Philadelphia, where he played with Eugene Slappy and Charlie Gaines. He returned to New York and put together a new ensemble in the 1940s, continuing to work in small settings for several decades. In the 1970s, he played with Jimmy Rushing, including on international tours.
