= Willie Bryant =

American jazz bandleader, vocalist and disc jockey (1908–1964)

William Stevens Bryant (August 30, 1908 – February 9, 1964) was an American jazz bandleader, vocalist, and disc jockey, known as the "Mayor of Harlem".

== Biography ==
Born in Chicago, Illinois, United States, while growing up he took trumpet lessons to little success. He was a child tap dancer; his first job in entertainment was dancing in the Whitman Sisters Show in 1926. He worked in various vaudeville productions for the next several years, and in 1934 he appeared in the show Chocolate Revue with Bessie Smith. His Broadway credits included Mamba's Daughters (1939), Mamba's Daughter's (revival 1940), and Blue Holiday.

In 1934, he put together his first big band, which at times included Teddy Wilson, Cozy Cole, Johnny Russell, Benny Carter, Ben Webster, Eddie Durham, Ram Ramirez, and Taft Jordan. They recorded six times between 1935 and 1938; Bryant sings on 18 of the 26 sides recorded.

Once his ensemble disbanded, Bryant worked in acting and disc jockeying. He recorded R&B in 1945 and led another big band between 1946 and 1948. He was the master of ceremonies on Night Life on CBS radio in the summer of 1946. During September and October 1949, he hosted Uptown Jubilee, a short-lived all-black variety show on CBS-TV . The show aired on Tuesday nights. He was master of ceremonies on Show Time at the Apollo, a musical TV series broadcast on Channel 11 in New York City beginning on September 21, 1963.

Bryant recorded for Apollo Records in the 1940s. In 1996 Delmark Records released Willie Bryant: Blues Around the Clock, a compact-disc reissue of 10 songs that Bryant recorded for Apollo between 1945 and 1949.

In the 1950s he was the emcee at the Apollo Theater in Harlem. He was fired from his disc jockey job at radio station WHOM in 1954. Bryant said that the cause was his refusal to pressure owners of stores and bars in Harlem to buy more Knickerbocker Beer. The station's vice-president said that they felt a change was needed.

Bryant opened his own club, the Orchid Room, in the Red Mill in the Bronx on September 28, 1956. His partners were Herman and Charlie Kaye, experienced night club operators in New York. The ABC radio network broadcast from the club live on Saturday nights.

He died of a heart attack in Los Angeles, California on February 9, 1964.
