= Mezz Mezzrow =

American jazz clarinetist and saxophonist (1899–1972)

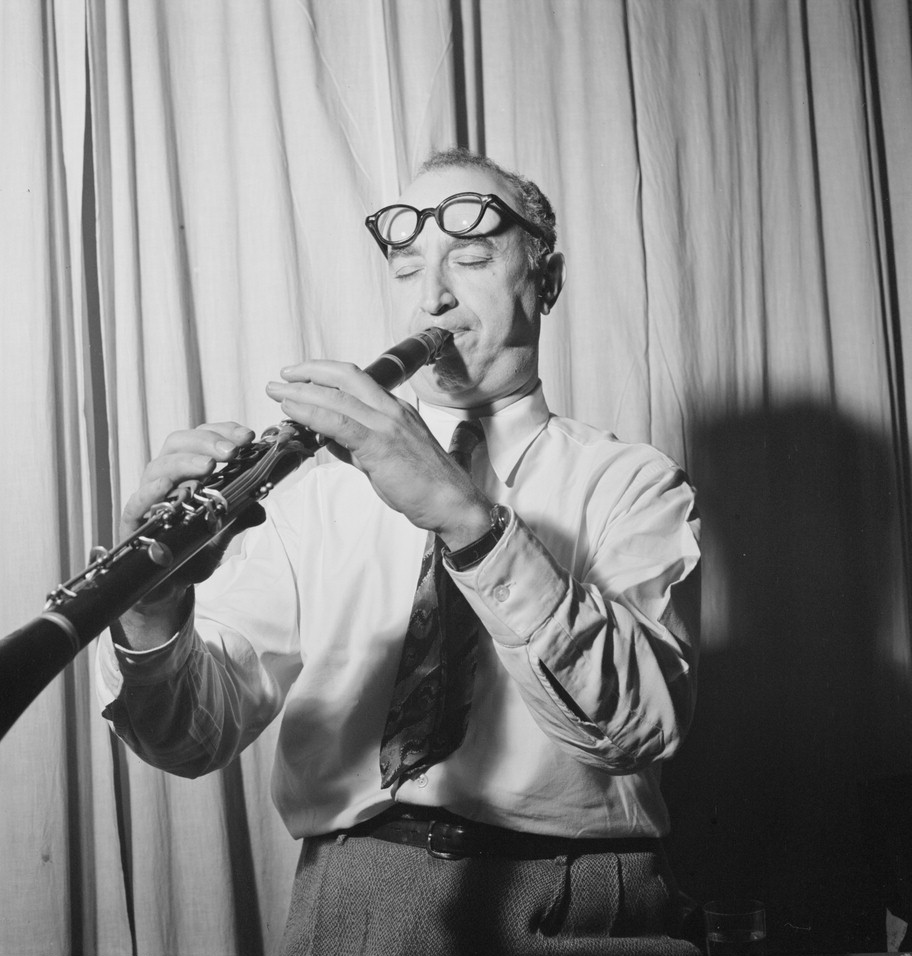
- Mezzrow, c. November 1946

Background information
- Also known as: Muggles King
- Born: Milton Mesirow; November 9, 1899; Chicago, Illinois, United States
- Died: August 5, 1972 (aged 72) Paris, France
- Genres: Dixieland; Mainstream jazz
- Occupations: Jazz clarinetist, saxophonist
- Instruments: Clarinet alto saxophone tenor saxophone

Milton Mesirow (November 9, 1899 – August 5, 1972), better known as Mezz Mezzrow, was an American jazz clarinetist and saxophonist from Chicago, Illinois. He is remembered for organizing and financing recording sessions with Tommy Ladnier and Sidney Bechet. He recorded with Bechet as well and briefly acted as manager for Louis Armstrong. Mezzrow is equally known as a colorful character, as portrayed in his autobiography, Really the Blues (which takes its title from a Bechet composition), co-written with Bernard Wolfe and published in 1946.

== Music career ==
According to one biographer: "As a juvenile delinquent, [Mezzrow] was in and out of reformatory schools and prisons where he was exposed to jazz and blues music. He began to play the clarinet and decided to adopt the African American culture as his own. He became a ubiquitous figure on the Chicago jazz scene of the 1920s and ran in the circles of musicians that included King Oliver, Louis Armstrong, Sidney Bechet, Jimmy Noone, Al Jolson, Baby Dodds, Bix Beiderbecke, Louis Bellson and many others. [He] was an advocate for the pure New Orleans jazz style."

Along with other white musicians of his era, such as Eddie Condon and Frank Teschemacher, Mezzrow visited the Sunset Café in Chicago to learn from, and listen to, Louis Armstrong and his Hot Five. He admired Armstrong so much that after the release of "Heebie Jeebies", he, along with Teschemacher, drove 53 miles to Indiana in order to play the song for Bix Beiderbecke.

Mezzrow's first recordings were released in 1933, under the band name Mezz Mezzrow And His Orchestra. The group was composed primarily of black musicians such as Benny Carter, Teddy Wilson, Pops Foster, and Willie "The Lion" Smith, but also included the Jewish trumpet player Max Kaminsky. During the 1930s and 1940s, Mezzrow organized and took part in many recording sessions with Sidney Bechet. These recordings, by the Mezzrow-Bechet Quintet and Mezzrow-Bechet Septet, featured black musicians such as Frankie Newton, Sammy Price, Tommy Ladnier, Sidney Catlett, and Cousin Joe, plus Art Hodes, who was born in Ukraine. Mezzrow's 1938 sessions for the French jazz critic Hugues Panassié involved Bechet and Ladnier, and helped spark the "New Orleans revival". He also played on six recordings by Fats Waller in 1934.

In the mid-1940s, Mezzrow started his own record label, King Jazz Records, featuring himself with groups, usually including Sidney Bechet and often including the trumpeter Oran "Hot Lips" Page.

He appeared at the 1948 Nice Jazz Festival, following which he made his home in France and organized many bands that included French musicians including Claude Luter and visiting Americans, such as Buck Clayton, Peanuts Holland, Jimmy Archey, Kansas Fields and Lionel Hampton. With ex-Count Basie trumpeter Buck Clayton, he made a recording of Louis Armstrong's "West End Blues" in Paris in 1953.

His total recorded output amounts to almost 150 sides, all of which were also collected and re-released on various albums.

Mezzrow's own playing was held in low regard by most critics, and his reputation rested more on his activities as an organizer and promoter than on his abilities as an instrumentalist. Nat Hentoff wrote in 1953 that he was "so consistently out of tune that he may have invented a new scale system", Whitney Balliett later called him an "abysmal" clarinetist, and Gunther Schuller, in The Swing Era (1989), dismissed his "corny arrangements and inept alto playing". Sidney Bechet's biographer John Chilton judged him "a limited musician with a sour tone and a stunted rhythmic, melodic and harmonic imagination", at his best on the slow blues duets where he could lean on Bechet but often "ludicrous" at faster tempos. Bechet, whose King Jazz sessions Mezzrow financed, never engaged him on a recording of his own, holding privately that "race does not matter — it is hitting the notes right that counts". He nonetheless retained defenders: Panassié championed him throughout his life, the bandleader Claude Luter thought him "a good amateur" in a non-pejorative sense, and the record producer Al Rose, though granting that "he wasn't a very good clarinetist", praised "his generosity and his total devotion to the music we call jazz".

== Personal life ==
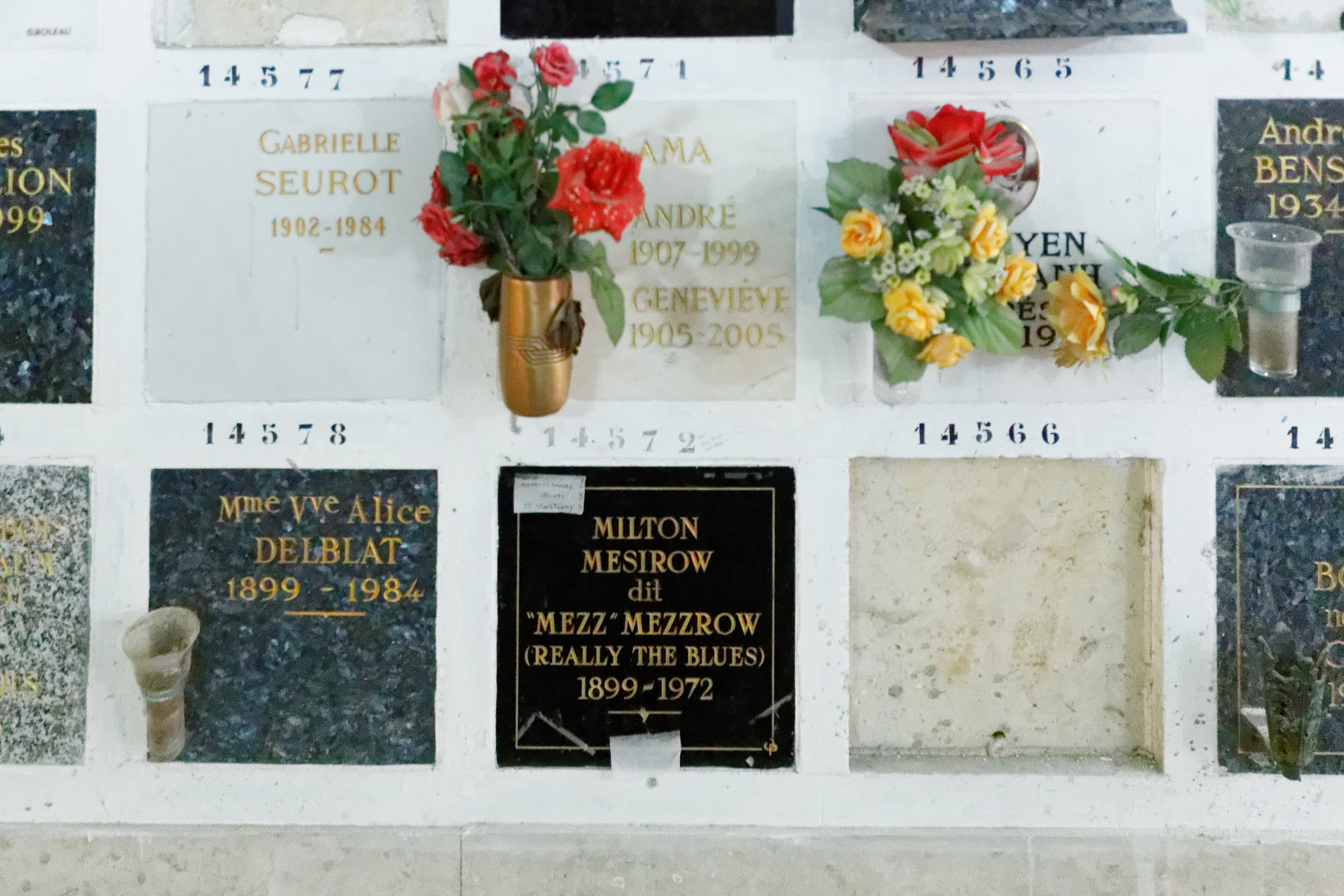
Père Lachaise Cemetery.

Milton Mesirow was ethnically and religiously Jewish, and was raised in Chicago. His wife, Johnnie Mae, was a black Baptist. They had one son, Milton Mesirow, Jr. According to the younger Mesirow, the surname "Mezzrow" was a "pen name" of his father's. In an interview with The New York Times in 2015, "Mezz Jr.", as he was known, told a reporter: "My father put me in a shul, and my mother's side tried to make me a Baptist. So when I'm asked what my religion is, I just say 'jazz.'"

Mezzrow praised and admired African-American culture and style. In his autobiography, Really the Blues, he wrote that from the moment he heard jazz he "was going to be a Negro musician, hipping [telling] the world about the blues the way only Negroes can." Eddie Condon said of him (in We Called It Music, London; Peter Davis 1948): "When he fell through the Mason–Dixon line he just kept going".

The family lived in Harlem, New York City, where Mezzrow declared himself a "voluntary Negro" and was listed as Negro on his draft card in World War II. He believed that "he had definitely 'crossed the line' that divided white and black identities".

Mezzrow became known as much for his cannabis advocacy as his music. In his time, he was so well known in the jazz community for selling marijuana that Mezz became slang for marijuana, a reference used in the Stuff Smith song, "If You're a Viper". He was also known as the Muggles King, the word muggles being slang for marijuana at that time; the title of the 1928 Louis Armstrong recording "Muggles" refers to this. Armstrong was one of his biggest customers. A letter from 1932, written by Armstrong, demonstrates this relationship; while in England, Armstrong detailed in this letter about where and how Mezzrow should send marijuana.

In 1940, he was arrested in possession of sixty joints while trying to enter a jazz club at the 1939 New York World's Fair, with intent to distribute. When he was sent to jail, he insisted to the guards that he was black and was transferred to the segregated prison's black section. In Really the Blues, he wrote:

Just as we were having our pictures taken for the rogues' gallery, along came Mr. Slattery the deputy and I nailed him and began to talk fast. 'Mr. Slattery,' I said, 'I'm colored, even if I don't look it, and I don't think I'd get along in the white blocks, and besides, there might be some friends of mine in Block Six and they'd keep me out of trouble'. Mr. Slattery jumped back, astounded, and studied my features real hard. He seemed a little relieved when he saw my nappy head. 'I guess we can arrange that,' he said. 'Well, well, so you're Mezzrow. I read about you in the papers long ago and I've been wondering when you'd get here. We need a good leader for our band and I think you're just the man for the job'. He slipped me a card with 'Block Six' written on it. I felt like I'd got a reprieve.

Mezzrow was lifelong friends with Panassié and spent the last 20 years of his life in France. He was preceded in death by his wife, Johnnie Mae Mezzrow, and was buried in the Père Lachaise Cemetery in Paris. The couple were survived by their son Mezz Jr.

In 2015, a Greenwich Village jazz club called Mezzrow was named in his honor.

== Selected discography ==
- 1947: Really the Blues, Jazz Archives (France)
- 1951: Mezz Mezzrow & His Band Featuring Collins & Singleton, Blue Note
- 1954: Mezz Mezzrow
- 1954: Mezz Mezzrow with Frankie Newton, Victor Records
- 1954: Mezz Mezzrow's Swing Session, X Records
- 1954: Mezzin' Around, RCA
- 1955: Mezz Mezzrow, Disques Swing
- 1955: Paris 1955, Vol. 1, Disques Swing
- 1955: Mezz Mezzrow in Paris, 1955, Jazz Time Records
- 1956: Mezz Mezzrow a La Schola Cantorum, Ducretet-Thomson Records
- 1995: Makin' Friends, EPM
- 2007: Tells the King Jazz Story, Crisler
- 2012: Mezzrow and Bechet Remastered, Gralin Music

== Bibliography ==
- Brothers, Thomas (2014). Louis Armstrong: Master of Modernism. New York, NY: W.W. Norton & Company. ISBN 978-0-393-06582-4.
