= Horace Henderson =

American jazz pianist, organist, arranger, and bandleader (1904–1988)

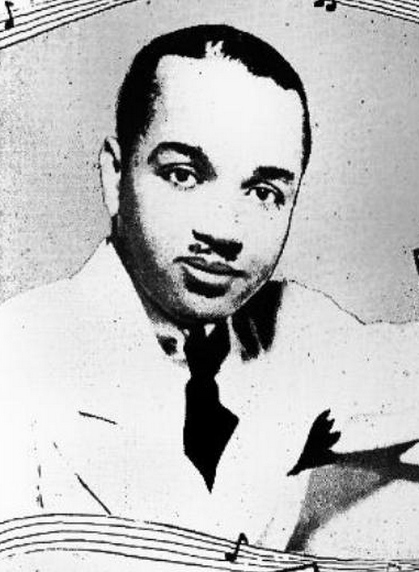

Background information
- Birth name: Horace Henderson
- Also known as: Little Smack
- Born: November 22, 1904 Cuthbert, Georgia, United States
- Died: August 29, 1988 (aged 83) Denver, Colorado, United States
- Genres: Jazz
- Occupation(s): Musician, bandleader, arranger
- Instrument: Piano

Horace W. Henderson (November 22, 1904 – August 29, 1988), the younger brother of Fletcher Henderson, was an American jazz pianist, organist, arranger, and bandleader.

Henderson was born in Cuthbert, Georgia, United States. While later attending Wilberforce University he formed a band called the Collegians, which included Benny Carter and Rex Stewart. This band was later known as the Horace Henderson Orchestra and then as the Dixie Stompers. Henderson left it to work with Sammy Stewart, then in 1928 organized a new band called the Collegians. Don Redman took over this band in 1931; Henderson continued to work as the band's pianist and arranger before leaving to work for his brother.

Fletcher Henderson's book contained about as many of Horace's arrangements as of Fletcher's. Although Horace worked continually, led bands, arranged, recorded, and composed into the 1980s, and although he is considered by many the more talented and skillful of the Henderson brothers, Fletcher remained more popular and accomplished more in the field.

Horace Henderson arranged for many other jazz musicians of the era. Among his other clients for arrangements were Charlie Barnet, the Casa Loma Orchestra, Tommy Dorsey, Benny Goodman, Earl Hines, and Jimmie Lunceford. His best-known arrangements were of his own "Hot and Anxious" (part of which became the main theme of "In The Mood") and "Christopher Columbus", of which he was one of the writers (but never received credit). He also wrote another popular instrumental of the big band era titled "Big John's Special". These were three important compositions of the period.

At different times in his career, Horace was pianist and musical director for both Lena Horne and Billie Holiday. He died in Denver Colorado in 1988
