= Edgar Hayes =

American jazz pianist and bandleader (1902–1979)

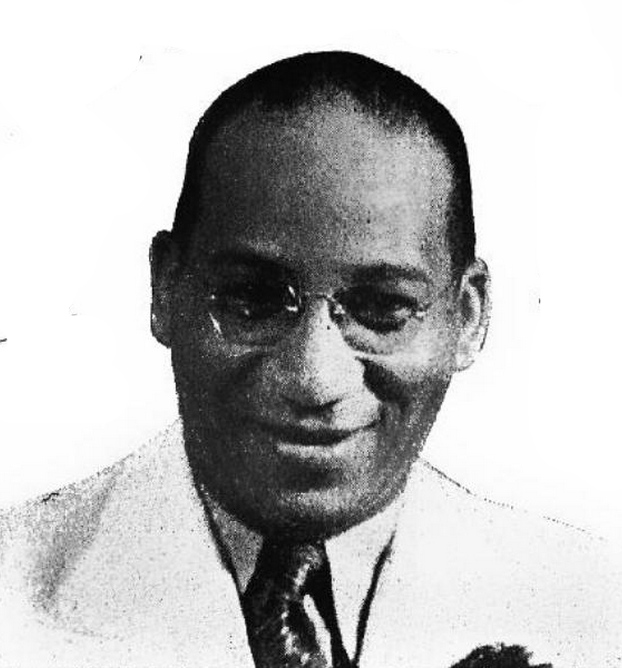
Edgar Hayes

Edgar Junius Hayes (May 23, 1902 – June 28, 1979) was an American jazz pianist and bandleader.

Born in Lexington, Kentucky, United States, Hayes attended Wilberforce University, where he graduated with a degree in music in the early 1920s. In 1922, he toured with Fess Williams, and formed his own group, the Blue Grass Buddies, in Ohio in 1924. In 1925, he played with Lois Deppe, and later in the decade led the groups Eight Black Pirates and the Symphonic Harmonists.

From 1931 to 1936, Hayes played in and arranged for the Mills Blue Rhythm Band. From 1937 to 1941, Hayes again led his own orchestra; Kenny Clarke was among his sidemen. His most popular recording was a version of the song "Stardust" and the original recording of "In the Mood" which was later covered by Glenn Miller, both songs were recorded in 1938. He moved to California in 1942, and led a quartet there for most of the decade. Following this he played solo, continuing to perform live into the 1970s. Hayes recorded under his own name in 1937–38, 1946, 1947, 1948, and 1960.

He died in San Bernardino, California, in 1979.
