= Booker Pittman =

American jazz musician

Booker Pittman Pitman (3 March 1909, Fairmount Heights, Maryland, USA – 19 October 1969, São Paulo, Brazil) was a jazz clarinetist who played with Louis Armstrong and Count Basie in the US and Europe in the 1920s and 1930s. He also played alto and soprano saxophones.

== Musical career ==
In 1930, Pittman was with Jap Allen's Cotton Club Orchestra, which included Joe Keyes, Ben Webster, Jim "Big Daddy" Walker, Clyde Hart, Slim Moore, Raymond Howell, Eddie "Orange" White, Al Denny, O.C. Wynne and Durwood "Dee" Stewart. He later joined Bennie Moten's band.

He left the US for the first time in 1933, when he went with Lucky Millinder's orchestra to Monte Carlo, and then to Paris, where he stayed for four years. During that period, he met a Brazilian musician named Romeo Silva, who took him on a tour of Brazil along with other musicians.

After a year in Brazil, he moved to Buenos Aires in Argentina, where he formed his own band, staying there until 1946, before returning to Brazil, where he was known by the nickname "Buca", and continuing his musical career there, playing at the Urca Casino.

== Personal life ==
Pittman was the son of Portia Washington Pittman and William S. Pittman and a grandson of Booker T. Washington.

He lived in Copacabana and befriended Jorge Guinle and Pixinguinha.

He died of laryngeal cancer at his home in the São Paulo quarter of Vila Nova Conceição at the age of 60. At the behest of his wife Ofélia, he was transferred to Rio de Janeiro and buried at the Cemitério São João Batista, in the Botafogo quarter.

His stepdaughter, Eliana Pittman, is a Brazilian jazz singer and actress.

== Sources ==
- Booker Pittman at Dicionário Cravo Albin da Música Popular Brasileira.
- Booker Pittman at Allmusic
- Official Website of Eliana Pittman
- Kripto Para
