= Orchestral jazz =

Music genre

Orchestral Jazz
- Stylistic origins: New Orleans jazz; sweet jazz; classical music
- Cultural origins: 1920s, United States
- Typical instruments: Trumpet; Trombone; Saxophone; Clarinet; Piano; Banjo; Drums; Percussion; Violin; Cello; Viola; Bassoon; Timpani; French horn; Tuba; Oboe; Flute; Voice; Electric Guitar; Double Bass; Electric Bass
- Derivative forms: Swing

Orchestral jazz or symphonic jazz is a form of jazz that developed in New York City in the 1920s. Early innovators of the genre, such as Fletcher Henderson and Duke Ellington, include some of the most highly regarded musicians, composers, and arrangers in all of jazz history. The fusion of jazz's rhythmic and instrumental characteristics with the scale and structure of an orchestra, made orchestral jazz distinct from the musical genres that preceded its emergence. Its development contributed both to the popularization of jazz, as well as the critical legitimization of jazz as an art form.

== History ==
Orchestral jazz developed from early New Orleans jazz. The African-American musicians who pioneered the genre prior to 1920, and who migrated from New Orleans to Chicago and New York in the early 1920s, brought jazz north; in time, the African-American neighborhood of Harlem became the genre's cultural center.

In New York, the entertainment and arts industries thrived and jazz found a fitting home, becoming an important part of the cultural landscape. But before the widespread popularity of big bands, which developed in tandem with the growing dance craze, jazz was generally regarded by the white mainstream as a rather crude variety of music. It was not widely listened to for its artistic value, as music critic Richard Hadlock writes:

"In the twenties, most of those who listened at all regarded jazz as merely an energetic background for dancers; the few who sought more profound values in the music tended to accept Paul Whiteman's concert productions... as the only jazz worth taking seriously.

A movement emerged during the 1920s, however, indebted in part to Paul Whiteman's musical influence. This movement led to the more stylized, and more formal variety of jazz that would become orchestral jazz, imagined first by Whiteman as symphonic jazz.

This stylization of jazz had elements of classical European composing, coupled with the rhythmic and instrumental sound of New Orleans jazz. Orchestral jazz was musically distinct from its southern predecessor for a variety of reasons: not only were the bands bigger, creating a certain richness of sound, but also the music was structurally more sophisticated. While New Orleans jazz was characterized by collective improvisation and the spontaneous reinterpretation of standard tunes, jazz orchestras played head arrangements that were composed and arranged prior to the performance in which they were executed. The busy, raucous style of early jazz did not hold the same kind of popular appeal that the comparative restraint of orchestral jazz did. In particular, the implementation of measured rhythm accounted for much of its popular appeal. The two-beat groove reminiscent of New Orleans jazz was replaced during the transition into the swing era by the bass innovations of Jimmy Blanton and Walter Page, both of whom are credited for developing the walking bass line. This would make four beats to the bar a jazz standard; furthermore, this rhythm was conducive to the kind of dancing audiences desired.

The rise of big band instrumentation had as much to do with artistic trends as it did with commercial viability. Significant technological developments transformed the music industry during the 1920s, allowing for an increase in the mass consumption of music. Phonographs and records became standard household items; indicative of the widespread popularization of recorded music is the fact that nearly 100 million records were sold in 1927 alone. Prearranged music had a particular commercial appeal, since audiences were familiar with the songs they saw performed live from the recordings they purchased. Furthermore, exposure to musical innovation—and jazz, in all its varieties, was certainly innovative—had never before reached the same breadth of American audience. Given the commercial availability of music—which, in addition to records, was aided by the proliferation of broadcast radio—a platform was thus created that accounted for the popularization of jazz. But the mass consumption of jazz simultaneously allowed the audience an inverted influence on its development, and consumer demands dictated that orchestral jazz adopted a structure similar to traditionally accessible popular music.

=== Paul Whiteman, Fletcher Henderson, and Don Redman ===
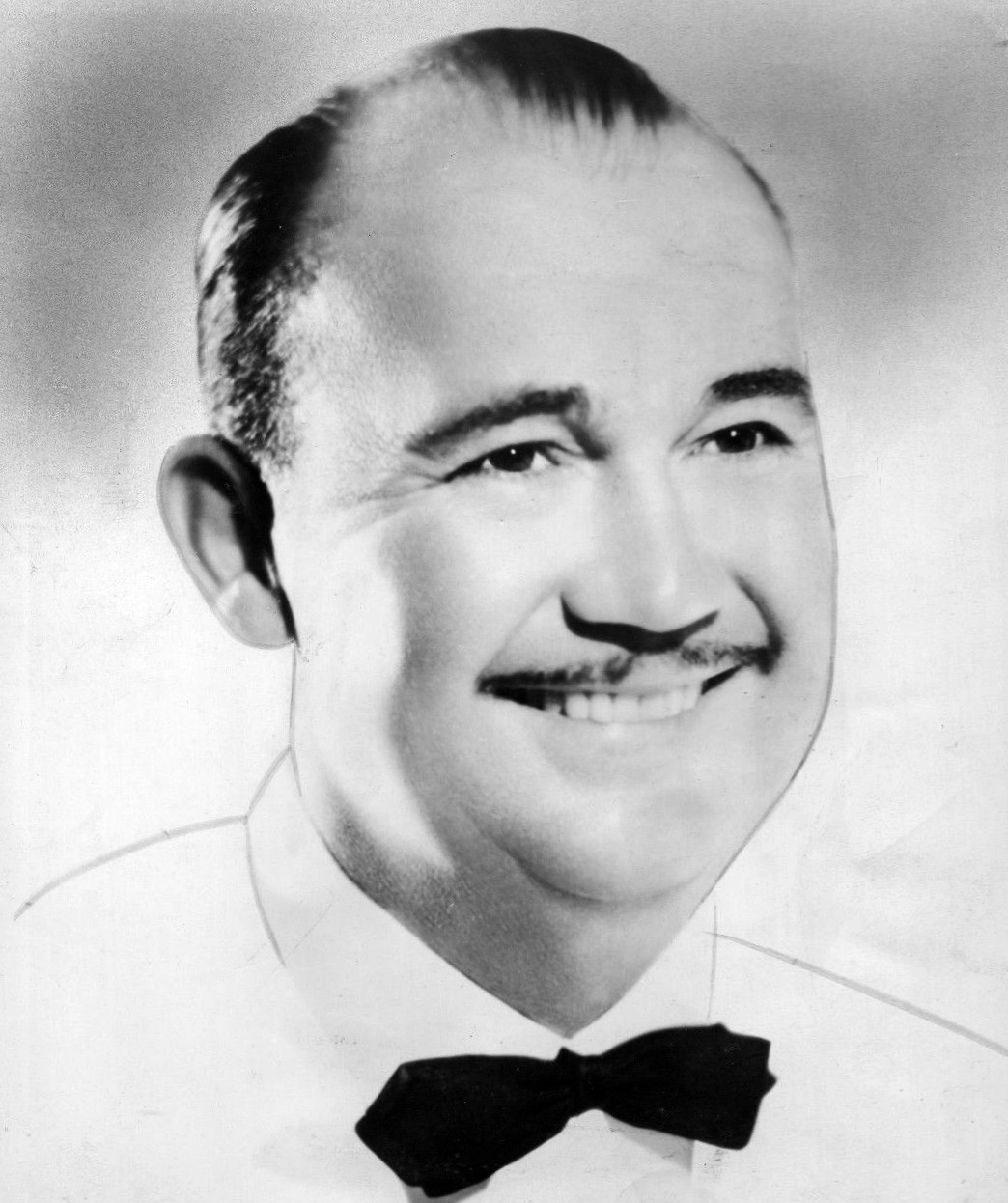
Whiteman in 1939

The "King of Jazz" in the early 1920s was Paul Whiteman, a classically trained musician from Denver. Prior to his time as a ballroom bandleader at the Palais Royal, in New York Whiteman played violin in both the Denver Symphony Orchestra and San Francisco Symphony Orchestra. His classical training substantially influenced the way in which he approached "Modern Music"; most famously, Whiteman's performance at Aeolian Hall in 1924 showcased the transformation he helped pioneer. Concluding this noteworthy show with George Gershwin's famous composition (and perhaps the best example of symphonic jazz) Rhapsody in Blue, Whiteman's performance is often cited as the event that signifies the arrival of jazz from a folk music to an art form. The showmanship and innovation Whiteman exhibited earned him the moniker "King of Jazz," though with this title there is a good deal of controversy associated. As a white man, Whiteman's capitalization on a musical genre that is incontrovertibly African-American in origins has led many critics to question the authenticity of his artistic pursuits, and even deem them exploitative. Despite this, many of Whiteman's contemporaries, black and white, praised him and, indicative of his influence, wanted to emulate his successes.

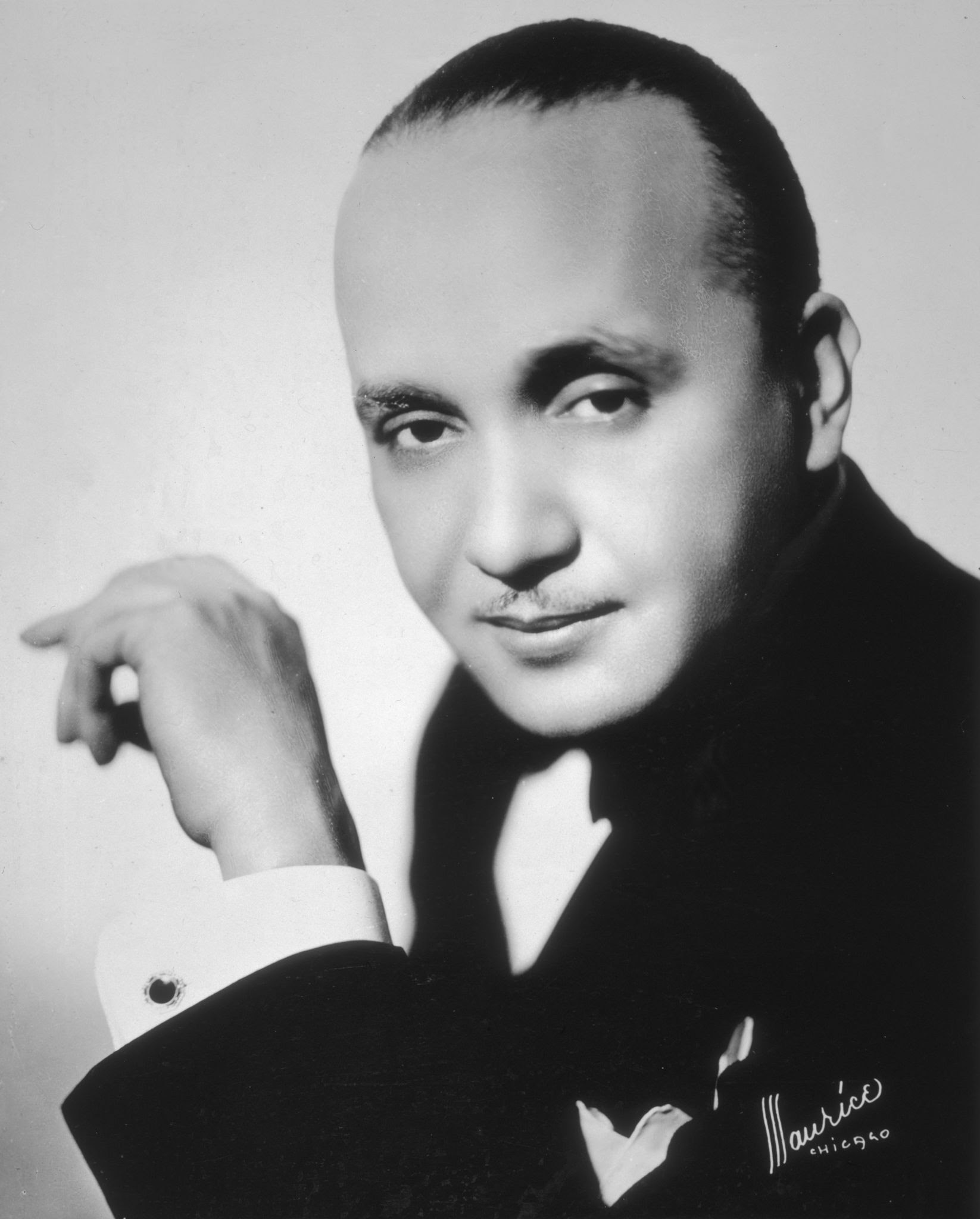
Henderson in 1943

Two of Whiteman's contemporaries that made, arguably, the most significant contributions to the development of orchestral jazz, were the collaborative duo of Fletcher Henderson and Don Redman. Though Henderson, a piano player, never gained the celebrity of many other bandleaders of the time, his collaborations with Redman nonetheless had enormous influence on the development of orchestral jazz, and particularly its transition from Whiteman's symphonic arrangements to the eventual supremacy of big band.

Redman's arrangements of new Orleans and Chicago jazz pieces re-imagined the musical potential of jazz, marking the shift from collective improvisation and polyphonic jazz tunes, to the much more widely consumable homophonic compositions characteristic of orchestral jazz. Other structural techniques, such as call-and-response, were apparent in Whiteman's arrangements that pre-date Redman's; however, Redman's use of call-and-response as his jazz compositions' underlying structure is thought of as one of his most important accomplishments. His use of arpeggiated chords, sectional point and counterpoint, changes in key signature and rhythm, and his layering of complex harmonies demonstrate Redman's nuanced grasp of musical composition.

Redman in 1933 in the short film I Heard

Redman also had a unique sense of band structure, the legacy of which still persists. Redman would divide the band into four interactive sections: woodwinds (saxophones and clarinets), trumpets, trombones, and rhythm sections. This would become the foundational structure for big bands which typically consist of four trumpets, four trombones, five saxophones, and rhythm section (piano, bass, guitar, and drums).

Variations in instrumentation also allowed for flexibility in performance. One important trend that coincided with the increase in availability of music was the dance craze of the 1920s and 1930s; the most successful bands of the era were those that accommodated their audience's desire to dance. Henderson's band, for example, began playing at the Roseland Ballroom in the early 1920s; his repertoire included not only "hot jazz" pieces, but also waltzes in deference to the desires of the Roseland's patrons. Henderson's consideration of his audience points to the importance of entertainment in the performance of the variety of jazz that was overtaking New York City (incidentally, however, Henderson was not considered to possess the same caliber of showmanship as other performers, such as Duke Ellington, and some attribute his lack of showmanship as the primary reason for the commercial struggles he suffered). Variety in a band's repertoire meant the incorporation of both pop and jazz standards into most performances, which also allowed for the organic fusion of the two genres by those who performed both.

But whereas Whiteman continued to write and perform an extensive amount of popular music—and did so almost exclusively after he suffered from the economic pressures of the Stock Market Crash of 1929—other big bands, like Henderson's, transitioned into the swing era.

Through this transition, Henderson and Redman had an approach to musical innovation quite distinct from Whiteman's--an approach firmly rooted in the jazz tradition. Specifically, the duo utilized the spontaneity and virtuosity of improvisation so integral to jazz as a unique musical genre. While Whiteman's own publicist declared the day of the jazz soloist to be over, Redman's arrangements maintained a balance between arranged passages and improvisation, and showcased the best musical talents of the era. Henderson's band featured an array of virtuosic talent, including, at various times, some of the best jazz soloists of all time. These included Louis Armstrong, Coleman Hawkins, Roy Eldridge, Benny Carter, Lester Young, and Chu Berry, to name just a few of the impressive bandmates Henderson recruited. After Henderson and Redman ended their formidable collaboration in 1927, Henderson eventually began, in 1931, to compose. He familiarized himself with the elements of composition by transcribing old jazz records and scoring them to a full orchestra.

=== Duke Ellington ===
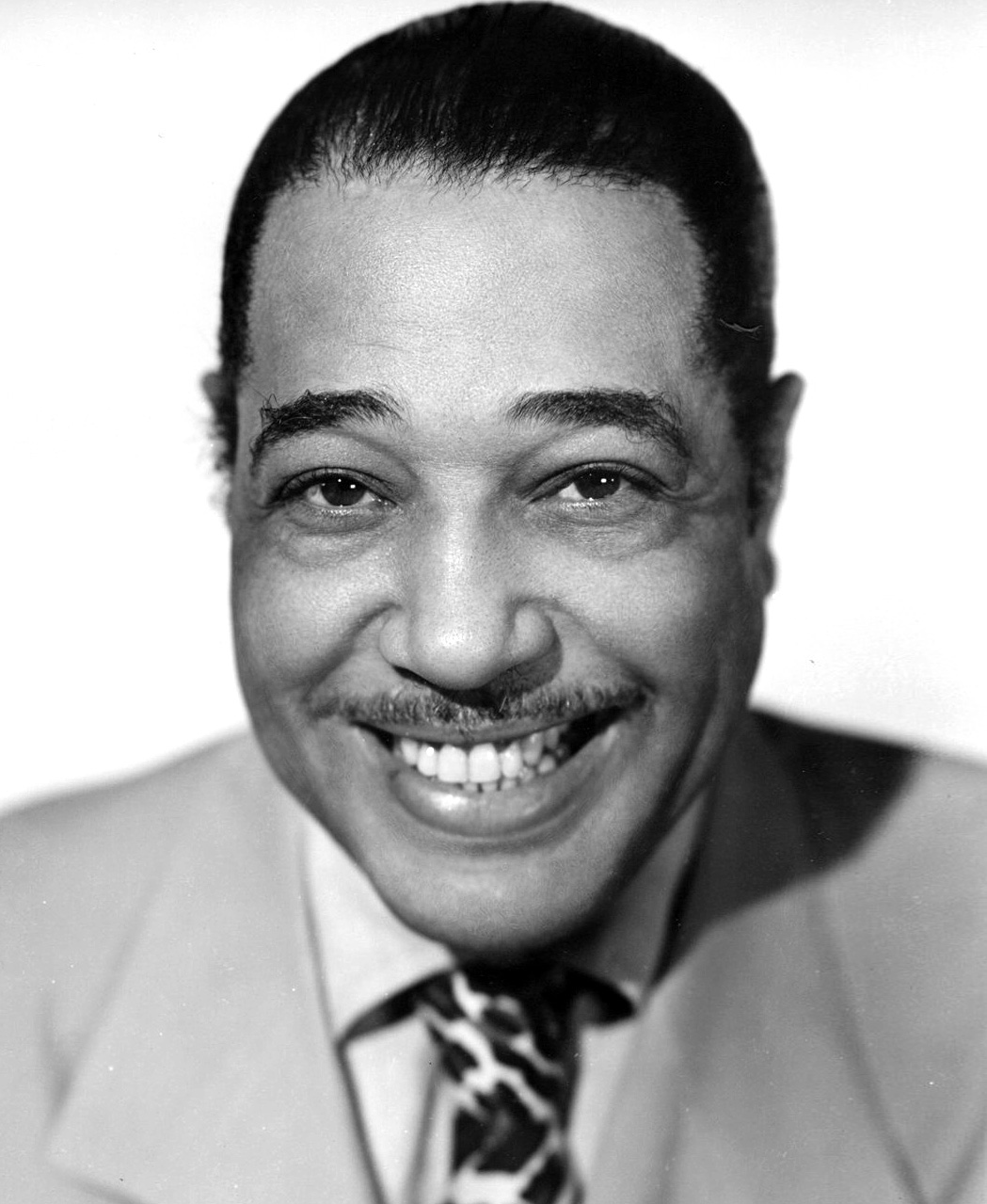
Ellington in the 1940s

As jazz and popular music evolved in tandem, the genres moved from separate spheres and became more closely linked with popularization of swing music. Big bands ushered in the swing era that began in the early 1930s, signifying the culmination of commercial jazz that was heavily orchestrated. This variety of jazz was much more commercially digestible than ever before, since it was intended to make its listeners dance.

However, this popularization of jazz was not a phenomenon to its dilution or disadvantage. Indeed, the big band of the 1920s and 1930s provided the necessary outlets for the realization of the legacies of both Whiteman and Henderson. This was probably best epitomized in the career of the most prolific composer of jazz, Duke Ellington. Widely known for his prodigious musical sense, Ellington's composing career began at the age of 14. He would go on to compose a tremendous variety of music, be captured on thousands of recordings, and perform for nearly five decades.

The subtleties of Ellington's composition make for a musical art that was at once thoughtful and complicated, as well as listenable and enjoyable. Ellington's contributions to jazz are innumerable, and yet, as indicated by the fame he gained in the mid-1920s, the genre is most indebted to him for elevating orchestral jazz to its pinnacle. No other artist was quite as able as Ellington to utilize jazz elements, though Henderson and Redman had attempted, quite so seamlessly with a large orchestra. Many of Ellington's compositions were written for specific members of his band, highlighting their individual talents and relying on their input to cultivate his sound. His orchestra would feature players such as Johnny Hodges, Ben Webster, Jimmy Blanton, Juan Tizol, Cootie Williams, Harry Carney, and would also see witness to a nearly thirty-year collaboration with composer-arranger-pianist Billy Strayhorn. Ellington's career, ultimately, is commonly cited as the culmination of jazz's golden era, so called the Jazz Age and the swing era.

=== Count Basie Orchestra ===
The Count Basie Orchestra emerged out of Kansas City, Missouri following the death of Bennie Moten and the dissemination of his band. Count Basie would arrive in Kansas City in 1927, initially performing with Walter Page and Moten. Basie's orchestra would feature many prominent members including Lester Young, Joe Keyes, Oran 'Hot Lips' Page, Buster Smith, Earle Warren, and later Illinois Jacquet, Paul Gonsalves and Lucky Thompson.

The orchestra was also well known for their rhythm section with including Basie on piano, Jo Jones on drums, Walter Page on bass, and Freddie Green on guitar. The rhythm section would go on to define the sound for modern big bands, with Jones being one of the first drummers to shift the role of timekeeping from the bass drum to the hi-hat cymbal, Page a leading innovator of the walking bassline, and Green developing the ''Freddie Green" style of guitar playing in which chords are played four to the bar, often while being muted slightly.

Basie's Orchestra was also well known for working with arrangers such as Neal Hefti, Quincy Jones and Sammy Nestico.

== Musical style and instrumentation ==
The most marked shifts from New Orleans and Chicago styles of jazz to orchestral jazz included the shift from polyphony to homophony, the general expansion of instrumentation, and a greater emphasis on pre-arranged compositions rather than collective improvisation. Prior to 1930, big bands were composed of trumpets, trombones, saxophones or clarinets, and a rhythm section made up of tuba, banjo, piano, and drums. Early big bands typically played 32-bar popular songs or 12-bar blues, which were organized around the traditional jazz two-beat groove; as the big band genre evolved, however, the four-beat swung rhythm became its most substantial change. This was in part a function of the change in the instrumentation of the rhythm section, and the incorporation of the string bass, as well as the substitution of guitar for the banjo. Finally, the musical arrangements that organized an ensemble's playing were based on a "riff approach" which made use of head arrangements. Head arrangements employ the call-and-response typical of African-American music; each orchestral section harmonizes a certain riff, responding to the phrases of the other sections. Orchestral jazz pieces, therefore, progressed logically through this tension, built and released by the harmonic communication of layered playing.
