= Paul Banks (jazz pianist) =

American jazz musician

Paul Banks was an American jazz pianist, bandleader, composer and lyricist.

In September 1923, Bennie Moten's Kansas City Orchestra recorded four of Banks's compositions for OKeh Records.

Based in Kansas City in the mid-1920s, Banks's bands were contemporaneous with those of the more successful Bennie Moten, and several of the musicians in Banks's bands would move on to join Moten. Considered to have a "sweeter sound", Banks's band was more popular with the white downtown audiences. According to the Kansas City Call, at a November 1926 "battle of the bands" at the Newman Theater, Banks's and Moten's bands "played to equal honors".

== Biography ==
Banks started out as a drummer for the Western Imperial Brass Band and then played with the pianist Andy Miller's orchestra at Eammon Hall, Kansas City. He then switched to piano and toured the Midwest before returning to Kansas City, where the Paul Banks Trio (with Clifton Banks on alto sax and Winston M. W. Holmes on clarinet) accompanied singers Lena and Sylvester Kimbrough.

In 1925 he set up a six-piece band, the Paul Banks Orchestra. Early band members included Ed Lewis, Jap Allen, Clifton Allen, Robert Simpson on trombone, and Ira Jones on banjo. Jack Washington joined shortly after before going on to join Bennie Moten's rival band in mid-1927.

In 1926, Paul Banks's Syncopating Orchestra had Clifton Banks on alto sax, Miles Pruitt or Ira Kinley on banjo, Robert Moody or Ben Simpson on trombone, James Everett on drums, Ed Lewis on trumpet, and Jap Allen on tuba.

A later line-up, Paul Banks's Ten Rhythm Aces, competed at a "battle of the bands" against Bill Little and His Little Bills, George E. Lee and His Brunswick Recorders, among others, during National Music Week, organised by the American Federation of Musicians. Other bands competing included Andy Kirk's Twelve Clouds of Joy and Bennie Moten and His Fourteen Victor Artists.

In 1930, Baby Lovett and Paul Webster joined the line-up.

== Compositions (as recorded by other artists) ==
- "Ill Natured Blues" - recorded Sept. 1923 by Bennie Moten's Kansas City Orchestra; Ada Brown (vocals) - OKeh 8456
- "Chattanooga Blues" - recorded Sept. 1923 by Bennie Moten's Kansas City Orchestra; Mary H. Bradford (vocals) - OKeh 8457
- "Selma Bama Blues" - recorded Sept. 1923 by Bennie Moten's Kansas City Orchestra; Mary H. Bradford (vocals) - OKeh 8461
- "Waco, Texas Blues" - recorded Sept. 1923 by Mary H. Bradford (vocals); Bennie Moten (piano); Lamar Wright (cornet) - OKeh 8463
- "Chattanooga Blues" - recorded Oct. 1926 by Lester McFarland (guitar and vocals) - Brunswick E4210-E4211

== Discography ==
- Nov. 1929: "Garbage Can Blues" - Paul Banks (piano); Sylvester Kimbrough (vocals) - Brunswick KC606
- Nov. 1929: "Bird Liver Blues" - Paul Banks (piano); Sylvester Kimbrough (vocals) - Brunswick KC607
