= Edgar Battle =

American jazz musician (1907–1977)

- Also known as: Puddinghead Battle
- Born: October 3, 1907; Atlanta, Georgia, U.S.
- Died: February 6, 1977 (aged 69) New York City, New York, U.S.
- Genre: Jazz
- Instruments: Trumpet, trombone, saxophone, piano

Edgar "Puddinghead" Battle (October 3, 1907 – February 6, 1977) was an American jazz multi-instrumentalist, composer, and arranger. He performed on trumpet, trombone, saxophone, and keyboard.

== Early life and education ==
Battle was born into a musical family in Atlanta. He started playing trumpet and formed his own band, the Dixie Serenaders when he was a student at Morris Brown University in 1921. The group changed their name to Dixie Ramblers a few years later.

== Career ==
Battle played with Eddie Heywood Sr., and toured with the 101 Ranch Boys traveling show. In the 1920s, he worked with Gene Coy, Andy Kirk, Blanche Calloway, Ira Coffey, and Willie Bryant. He moved to New York City in the early 1930s and did short stints with Benny Carter and Sam Wooding before joining George White's ensemble on Broadway. Over time, he began doing more work as a studio musician and arranger, writing charts for Cab Calloway, Paul Whiteman, Fats Waller, Earl Hines, Rudy Vallee, and Count Basie.

During World War II, Battle held a position as an electrician in a shipyard, concomitantly running a big band with Shirley Clay. In the 1950s, he founded Cosmopolitan Records, and continued to play in big bands part-time through the 1960s. Among his numerous jazz compositions are the pieces "Topsy" (co-composed with Eddie Durham) and "Doggin' Around" (with Herschel Evans).

== Personal life ==
Edgar Battle died in New York in February 1977, at the age of 69.

== See also ==
- List of jazz arrangers
