= Jap Allen =

American jazz musician

Jasper "Jap" Allen was an American jazz musician and bandleader. He played tuba, sousaphone and bass violin.

== Biography ==
In 1925, Jap Allen was a member of the Paul Banks Orchestra. Other band members included Ed Lewis, and Clifton Allen.

In 1926, Jap Allen, on tuba, was still a member of Paul Banks's band, now named Paul Banks's Syncopating Orchestra, with Clifton Banks on alto sax, Miles Pruitt or Ira Kinley on banjo, Robert Moody or Ben Simpson on trombone, James Everett on drums, and Ed Lewis on trumpet.

== As bandleader ==
In the late 1920s, Allen was leading his own band in Kansas City, which included Joe Keys (Keyes) on trumpet, Clyde Hart on piano, and Ben Webster on tenor sax.

Shortly thereafter, Jap Allen's Cotton Pickers, still with Webster, Hart, and Keys, now had Jim "Daddy" Walker on guitar, and Slim Moore on trombone.

In 1930, Jap Allen's Cotton Club Orchestra featured Joe Keyes, Ben Webster, Jim "Big Daddy" Walker, Clyde Hart, Slim Moore, Raymond Howell on drums, Eddie "Orange" White, Al Denny, O.C. Wynne, Booker Pittman, Durwood "Dee" Stewart.

A later line-up, Jasper Allen's Southern Troubadours, were pitted against Andy Kirk's Twelve Clouds of Joy competing at a "battle of the bands" during National Music Week, organised by the American Federation of Musicians.

Another battle of the bands took place between Allen's band and McKinney's Cotton Pickers, then with Don Redman as musical director.
