= Tommy Stevenson =

- Born: February 21, 1914
- Died: 1944 (aged 29–30)
- Genres: Jazz
- Occupation: Instrumentalist
- Instrument: Trumpet
- Years active: 1933–1944

Tommy Stevenson (February 21, 1914 – October 1944) was a jazz trumpet player in the big band era. He was the first high note trumpeter to be featured on recordings.

Nicknamed "Steve," Tommy joined Jimmie Lunceford's band in 1933, and recordings from that time feature him hitting notes that no trumpeter had been recorded hitting before. His solos, like those on the Lunceford recordings "White Heat" and "Rhythm Is Our Business," were later recreated note-for-note by trumpeters such as Paul Webster and Ollie Mitchell. Tommy created much of the vaudeville-style choreography that made the Lunceford band so popular during this period, and this, combined with the increasing audience attention he was receiving for his high-note solos, caused him to demand from Lunceford top billing. This was denied, so in March 1935 he left Lunceford's band. Although he never regained the popularity he had with the Lunceford organization, he did go on to play and/or record with big bands led by Blanche Calloway (1935–1936), Don Redman (1936–1940), Coleman Hawkins, Lucky Millinder, Slim Gaillard and Cootie Williams, mostly playing lead trumpet. While playing with Cootie's band in New York City in 1944 he contracted lobar pneumonia and died suddenly at the age 30.

== Sources ==
- Determeyer, Eddy. Rhythm Is Our Business: Jimmie Lunceford and the Harlem Express. University of Michigan Press, 2006. ISBN 0-472-11553-7
- "Scream Trumpet" – audio clips
- Yanow, Scott. Trumpet Kings: The Players Who Shaped the Sound of Jazz Trumpet. Backbeat Books, 2001. ISBN 0-87930-640-8
