= Joe Keyes (musician) =

American jazz musician

Joe Keyes (c. 1907 – November 1950) was an American jazz trumpeter during the 1930s and 1940s with the band of Bennie Moten, Count Basie, and Hot Lips Page.

== Life and career ==
He was born in Houston, Texas, and was playing in local bands such as Johnson's Joymakers by 1928. He then played in bands led by Gene Coy, Jap Allen, and Blanche Calloway, before joining Bennie Moten's band in 1932. Following Moten's death in 1935, and together with several other members of the band, he joined the Count Basie Orchestra, but left in 1937. He then worked in the band led by "Hot Lips" Page, and recorded with guitarist Eddie Durham and saxophonist Buster Smith. Around 1941, he played briefly with both Fletcher Henderson and Fats Waller, and in 1943 with Claude Hopkins.

However, by 1943 Keyes had become unreliable as a result of alcoholism, and performed rarely. After Keyes had pawned his trumpet, Cab Calloway offered him the opportunity to join his band if he could clean up his act, but Keyes was unable to do so. His body was found floating in the Harlem River in New York City on November 6, 1950. He had apparently drowned, but unsubstantiated rumours circulated that he had been murdered.

== Discography ==
With Count Basie

- The Original American Decca Recordings (GRP, 1992)
