= Paul Webster (jazz) =

American jazz musician

Paul Francis Webster (August 24, 1909 - May 6, 1966) was a jazz trumpeter in the big band era. He was a high-note specialist for Jimmie Lunceford's band, and later played in several other big bands.

== Early life ==
Webster was born in Kansas City, Missouri, on August 24, 1909. He attended Fisk University.

== Later life and career ==
Webster became a professional musician around 1927. He played in bands led by George E. Lee (1927), Bennie Moten (1927–28), Paul Banks (1930), and Jap Allen (around 1930). He joined Jimmie Lunceford's band in 1931, then moved to Tommy Douglas (around the same year), and vocalist Eli Rice (1933–34).

Webster returned to Lunceford in 1935, and became known as a high-note specialist. He appeared on film in Jimmie Lunceford and His Dance Orchestra, which was made in 1936. After leaving Lunceford in 1944, he joined Cab Calloway's band, and played with them on and off into the 1950s. He was part of other bands in the same period, including those led by Charlie Barnet (1946–47, and 1952–53), Sy Oliver (1947), Eddie Wilcox, and Count Basie (1950). He played part-time from 1953 into the 1960s. Webster died in New York on May 6, 1966.

== Discography ==
With Jimmie Lunceford

- Lunceford Special (Columbia 1967)
- Harlem Shout Vol. 2 (1935–1936) (Decca, 1967)
- Rhythm Is Our Business Vol. 1 (1934–1935) (Decca, 1968)
- For Dancers Only Vol. 3 (1936–1937) (MCA 1972)
- 1940 (Circle 1981)

With others

- Charlie Barnet, Sky Liner (MCA 1976)
- Cab Calloway, Hi De Ho Man (Columbia 1974)
- Ella Fitzgerald, The First Lady of Song (Decca, 1958)
- Rex Stewart, Henderson Homecoming (United Artists, 1959)
