= Myra Taylor (singer) =

American singer-songwriter

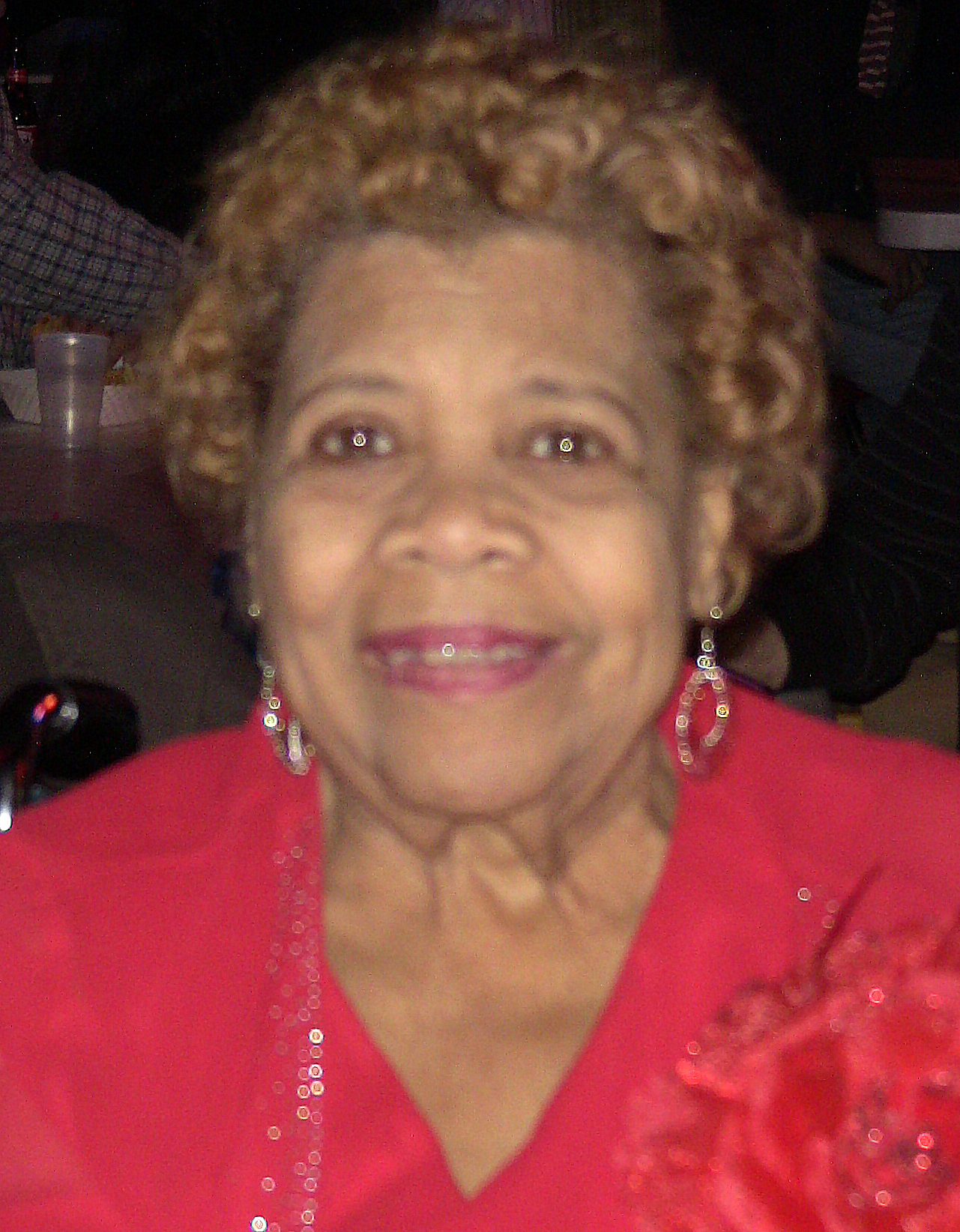
- Myra Taylor at her 94th birthday party, Knuckleheads Saloon

Background information
- Born: Myra Jardine Render; February 24, 1917; Bonner Springs, Kansas, U.S.
- Died: December 9, 2011 (aged 94) Kansas City, Missouri, U.S.
- Genres: Vocal jazz
- Occupation: Singer
- Years active: 1940–2011

Myra Taylor (February 24, 1917 – December 9, 2011) was an American jazz singer and songwriter. She began performing as a teenager and continued into her nineties.

== Early life ==
Myra Jardine Render, later Taylor, was born in Bonner Springs, Kansas, but her family moved to Kansas City, Missouri's historic 18th and Vine area when she was a child. Working as a housekeeper at age 14, she began dancing at the Sunset and Reno clubs on 12th street. Being underage, she entered some clubs by sneaking in through a rear window and eventually attracted attention singing.

== Acting career ==
Taylor appeared as the character Pearl in three episodes of the US television program The Jeffersons - The Arrival (Part 1) and The Arrival (Part 2) in 1980 and Men of the Cloth in 1982

She was the lead in the 1979 women's professional basketball comedy Scoring, as well as supporting roles in Suspect, Crossing Delancey, Lasse Hallström's Once Around, and Ron Howard's The Paper.

== Music career ==
In the 1930s, she toured the Midwest with Clarence Love's band. She moved to Chicago in 1937 and worked with Warren "Baby" Dodds, Lonnie Johnson, Roy Eldridge and Lil Hardin Armstrong. She returned to Kansas City in 1940 and Harlan Leonard hired Taylor as the featured singer for his new band Harlan Leonard and His Rockets. The band had a lengthy engagement at Harlem's Golden Gate Ballroom. The band recorded I Don't Want to Set the World on Fire on RCA's Bluebird Records label. Taylor wrote the song Dig It, and Leonard claimed co-writing credit, later omitting her name and denying her royalties.

Taylor and Leonard parted company, and she join Eubie Blake's band for a USO tour. She then returned to Kansas City to sing with the Jimmy Keith Orchestra, and in 1946 they had a hit with Spider and the Fly on Mercury Records. The Billboard review said of her performance "Miss Taylor sings with a subtle sob and a real 'blues' vibrato that adds up to a stellar performance". but was denied royalties by publisher Blasco Music, who claimed that despite the record being a "smash" there were no profits.

Frustrated at the American music business, she spent most of the 1950s in Ciudad Juárez, Mexico. She began touring in Europe, and in 1965 moved to Frankfurt, Germany, and started to work at the music club named Down by the Riverside. She performed in USO shows during World War II, the Korean War and the Vietnam War, performing in 32 different countries. In 1977, she moved back to the United States and settled in Los Angeles, California, to work in film and television, and in 1994 relocated back to her native Kansas City.

In 2000, she recorded My Night to Dream for Analogue Production Originals records and released it on the very inauspicious date of September 11, 2001. It was re-released on SACD in 2010.

Taylor continued singing, performing with the group Wild Women of Kansas City but the only recording with the group was at the Pilgrim Chapel on September 26, 2010. A CD is available from the venue, featuring tracks including Sentimental Journey, What a Wonderful World, and Minnie the Moocher.

She celebrated her 94th birthday with a concert at Knuckleheads Saloon with Samantha Fish and Mike Zito.

Taylor's final performance was July 24, 2011 with the Wild Women of Kansas City at Jardine's nightclub in Kansas City. Her health declined in the last half of 2011 following a fall and she was no longer able to live at her own home. She spent the final three months of her life at Kansas City's Swope Ridge Geriatric Center.

== Death ==
She died December 9, 2011, at the Swope Ridge Geriatric Center in Kansas City, Missouri, aged 94.

== Discography ==
=== Albums ===
- Kansas City Jump: Swingin Small Combos (Blue Moon Imports, 2007)
- My Night to Dream (Analogue Production Originals, 2001)

=== Singles ===
- Move Out/Quit Barking In My Rhubarb (Mercury)
- Clinging Vine/It's a Sin to Tell a Lie (Mercury)
- I'm in My Sins This Morning/Booted (Mercury)

=== Compilations ===
- Thorens 125th Anniversary LP – Spider and the Fly (2008)
- Radio Radio: Theme Time Radio Hour Volume Two- Still Blue Water (2009)
