= Clyde Hart (pianist) =

American jazz pianist and arranger (1911–1945)

- Born: January 2, 1911; Galena, Kansas, U.S.
- Died: March 19, 1945 (aged 34) New York City, U.S.
- Genre: Bebop jazz
- Occupations: Musician and arranger
- Instrument: Piano

Clyde Hart (January 2, 1911 – March 19, 1945) was an American jazz pianist and arranger. He was an important figure in the transition from swing to bebop.

== Life and career ==
Hart was born in Galena, Kansas, on January 2, 1911. He started his career as a professional jazz pianist in 1929 when he joined Gene Coy's ensemble. He was also part of Jap Allen's band from 1929 to 1931. Hart played piano in Blanche Calloway's big band from 1931 to 1935 and was based in New York City from 1936.

In the late 1930s, Hart played with Lionel Hampton and Chu Berry. In the first half of the 1940s he played with John Kirby, Roy Eldridge and Hot Lips Page, among others. In the last few months of his life, Hart performed with some of the most important figures of the bebop era, such as Charlie Parker, Dizzy Gillespie and Don Byas, and led recording three sessions. He died of tuberculosis in New York City in March 1945, at the age of 34.

== Discography ==
- Roy Eldridge, Arcadia Ballroom 1939 Arcadia Shuffle (Jazz Archives, 1973)
- Charlie Parker, The Immortal Charlie Parker (Savoy, 1955)
- Joe Guy & Hot Lips Page, Trumpet Battle at Minton's (Xanadu, 1975)
- Ben Webster, Ben and the Boys (Jazz Archives, 1976)
- Ben Webster, The Horn (Circle, 1982)
