= Kansas City jazz =

Style of jazz music

- Stylistic origins: Blues, Dixieland, ragtime, big band, swing, stride
- Cultural origins: 1920s and 1930s
- Typical instruments: Banjo; piano; saxophone; clarinet; trumpet; double bass; drums
- Derivative forms: Bebop

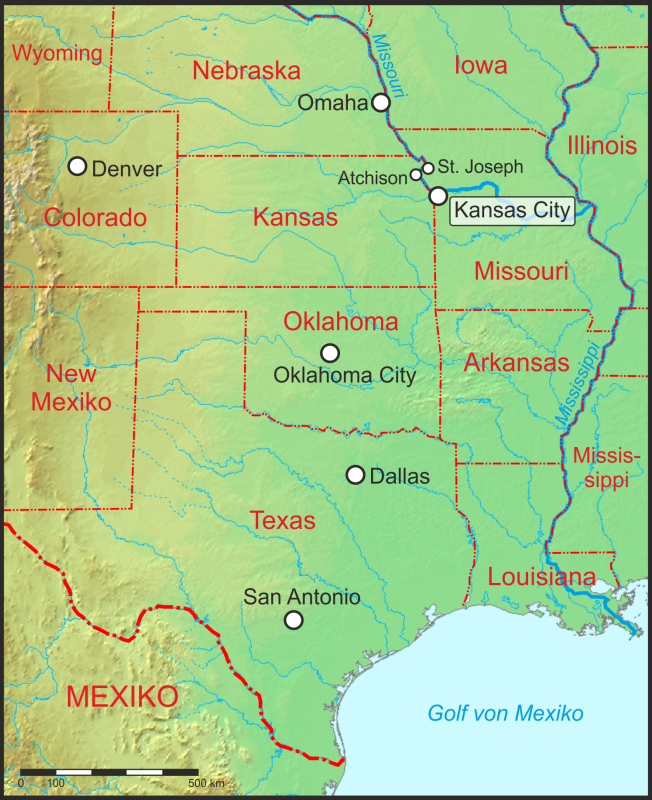
Kansas City jazz is popular in these cities.

Kansas City jazz is a style of jazz that developed in Kansas City, Missouri during the 1920s and 1930s, which marked the transition from the structured big band style to the much more improvisational style of bebop. The hard-swinging, bluesy transition style is bracketed by Count Basie, who in 1929 signed with Bennie Moten's Kansas City Orchestra, and Kansas City native Charlie Parker, who promoted the bebop style in America.

Kansas City is known as one of the most popular "cradles of jazz". Other cities include New Orleans, Chicago, St. Louis, Philadelphia, and New York City. Kansas City was known for the organized musicians of the Local 627 A.F.M., which controlled a number of venues in the city. Almost every jazz history depicts Kansas City jazz as a fertile ground for the development of big bands, virtuosic performances, and legendary performers. In the 1920s was a Great Migration from the south and the search for musical work in Kansas City, Missouri, where the Black population rose from 23,500 to 42,000 between 1912 and 1940. Russell, Diggs, and Pearson have well documented how the vice district expanded within black neighborhoods of Kansas City, resulting in economic success for jazz musicians. Many musicians from the Southwest moved to Kansas City for its plentiful jobs. "Nightclubs in Kansas City served up prostitution, gambling, and narcotics along with liquor".

The community hosted a vibrant jazz and blues music scene, attracting musicians from across the country. The community prominently shaped the development of jazz and blues and hosted some of the era's most pivotal musicians. Edward Murrow wrote in the Omaha World-Herald: "If you want to see sin, forget about Paris and go to Kansas City". A variety of clubs and cabarets, dance halls, and jazz venues arose in Kansas City, including the Paseo Room, Pla-Mor Ballroom, Reno Club, Amos 'n' Andy, Boulevard Lounge, Cherry Blossom, Chocolate Bar, Lone Star, Elk's Rest, Old Kentucky Bar-B-Que, Sunset, Subway, Spinning Wheel, Hawaiian Gardens, Street's Blue Room, Hell's Kitchen, The Hi Hat, and the Hey-Hay. Kansas City became known for "small, intimate" clubs that hosted frequent, "long-lasting jam sessions". Becker said that Kansas City "drew its vitality from the political corruption which made nightlife possible". Kansas City's concentration of outstanding jazz talent had made it a potential competitor to New York and Chicago by the middle of the 1930s.

== Background ==
The first band from Kansas City, Missouri, to acquire a national reputation was the Coon-Sanders Original Nighthawk Orchestra, a white group which broadcast nationally in the 1920s. However, the Kansas City jazz school is identified with the black bands of the 1920s and 1930s, including those led by Bennie Moten, Andy Kirk, Harlan Leonard, George E. Lee, Count Basie, and Jay McShann.

Bennie Moten was born in Kansas City on December 13, 1893, the beginning of the story of the 1923 recording session. During his first gigs, Moten played house rent parties and brothels operating from private homes, according to long-time Kansas City native Fred Hicks. Between 1916 and 1918, Moten began performing with the drummer Dude Langford. According to Langford, "[When] I first met Bennie, he was playing around town, little old joints here, some of 'em just little fronts, a bar and a gambling room in the back."

As a member of Moten's Kansas City band in 1929, Count Basie honed his skills in traveling shows. However, the blues eventually became an even more influential source for Basie, saying: "I had never paid much attention to the blues or played them myself. My first encounter with real blues was during a burlesque show I performed in after moving from New York City to Kansas City". The success of Count Basie nationally and internationally led bookers, managers, and record producers to come to Kansas City in search of similar talent.

According to Gray Giddins, Basie "is the only major jazz figure to realize his individuality by paring down his technique" because he discovered his style through a search for identity. "From his first session with Bennie Moten to those with his own band in the late 1930s, Basie could be heard in various settings responding to musical challenges as a committed ensemble player, making choices that might serve others as well". Jo Jones, a member in Basie's band stated: "It has to do with what I will try to explain to you about head arrangements in the Basie band and how we didn't have to rehearse back in Kansas City. It was just there, and we played it. Now it was a very strange thing in this city. Nobody ever got in nobody's way. No finger and say: 'You take it now. You take the next chorus'."

Born in Kansas City, Kansas, Charlie Parker learned about music by spending time in the alleyways behind nightclubs that lined Twelfth Street. He was an influential jazz saxophonist and composer whose playing style impacted jazz. Like Louis Armstrong, who mastered his native New Orleans idiom before breaking free, Parker was refined in the Kansas City jam sessions and never challenged his foundation. By pushing the boundaries of the traditional jazz style, he created an entirely new sound that became the foundation of modern jazz. Due to Parker's dubious musical reputation, Oliver Todd reluctantly allowed him to join his Hottentots band: "I tried to take him under my wing. He was very green. If you had told me then that he would be famous I wouldn't have believed it. He had a lot to learn. He was very determined. [...] He worked hard."

Parker was able to improvise, which allowed him to explore new melodies and harmonies creating a style that was inspired by traditional jazz but unique in its own right. Much has been made of the influence of the Kansas City tradition on modern jazz though Charlie Parker helped bridge the two styles of jazz that's not the only similarity of the two styles. The lineage of the Kansas City saxophone provides a direct connection to young Charlie Parker as a pioneering figure. For instance, in his award-winning book on Charlie Parker titled Kansas City Lightning, Stanley Crouch described Kansas City this way: "People came to guzzle the blues away, to chase the night long, to take the risk of leaving in a barrel as they laid bet after bet, and, as ever, there were those who came to involve themselves in the mercantile eroticism of the high to low courtesans."

Kansas City, like the rest of the country, experienced a change in listening habits as a result of vaudeville blues recordings in the early 1920s, and the Moten Orchestra capitalized on the trend (289 rice). "The Bennie Moten Orchestra would eventually emerge in the 1920s as Kansas City's top instrumental jazz ensemble". During 1924, the Moten Orchestra became the primary entertainers at Kansas City's elite black ballroom, the Paseo Dance Hall, at 15th Street and Paseo. Over the next two decades, the Moten band grew in success and prominence.

In the 1930s, Kansas City was very much the crossroads of the United States, resulting in a mix of cultures. Transcontinental trips by plane or train often necessitated a stop in the city. The era marked the zenith of power of political boss Tom Pendergast. Kansas City was a wide open town with prohibition era liquor laws and hours totally ignored, and was called the new Storyville. Most of the jazz musicians associated with the style were born in other places but got caught up in the friendly musical competitions among performers that could keep a single song being performed in variations for an entire night. Often members of the big bands would perform at regular venues earlier in the evening and go to the jazz clubs later to jam for the rest of the night.

During the 1930s, a hybrid style between Kansas City jazz and big band was the most popular form of jazz music in the United States, often being played in popular venues and ballrooms. In 1936, Kansas City's influence overtly transferred to the national scene, when record producer John Hammond discovered Count Basie on his car radio. Pendergast was convicted of income tax fraud in 1940, and the city cracked down on the clubs effectively ending the era.

Jay McShann told the Associated Press in 2003: "You'd hear some cat play, and somebody would say 'This cat, he sounds like he is from Kansas City.' It was Kansas City Style. They knew it on the East Coast. They knew it on the West Coast. They knew it up North and they knew it down South." Claude "Fiddler" Williams described the scene: "Kansas City was different from all other places because we'd be jamming all night. And [if] you come up here [...] playing the wrong thing, we'd straighten you out."

Tenor saxophonist Lester Young was a hero among writers and musicians. "Known as 'president' of the saxophone, he gained recognition for his musical genius while playing leading swing bands of the 1930s, including the 13 Original Blue Devils and the King Oliver and Count Basie bands". He gained recognition for his signature whistling sound and his impact on jazz has been recognized by jazz historians. Redefining the role of the tenor sax was only the first of Young's achievements. In this way, he profoundly changed jazz melodic improvisation, offering a counterpoint to Armstrong's hot, syncopated style. His unique sound initially faced criticism, but in 1936, when Basie's band was established, Lester Young became a jazz star. His music with Basie, Holiday, and various small groups such as the Kansas City Seven is among the greatest and most consistent bodies of recorded work in jazz history (174 icons of music).

On "Oh, Lady Be Good", Lester Young has a solo often imitated by later jazz generations. It is regarded as one of the most forward-thinking improvisations of the decade due to its fluidity, rhythmic phrasing, and creativity. The Count Basie band and Young were most commonly associated with Kansas City. The connection between Young's ideas, his music, and his jive can be clearly understood through the role of music and language in Afro-American culture. In the Southwest, a tradition of storytelling is as strong in music as it is in speech, according to bassist Gene Ramey of Kansas City. When he explained how Young dethroned Coleman Hawkins in a legendary tenor-saxophone battle at the Cherry Blossom, he noted that the Kansas City musician played more creatively.

== Style ==
Kansas City jazz is distinguished by the following musical elements:

- A preference for a 4 feel (walking) over the 2-beat feel found in other jazz styles of the time. This gave Kansas City jazz a more relaxed, fluid sound than previous jazz styles.
- Extended soloing. Fueled by the non-stop nightlife under political boss Tom Pendergast, Kansas City jam sessions continued until later than sunrise, fostering a highly competitive atmosphere and a unique jazz culture in which the goal was to "say something" with one's instrument, rather than simply show off one's technique. It was not uncommon for one "song" to be performed for several hours, with the best musicians often soloing for dozens of choruses at a time.
- So-called "head arrangements". The Kanzas City (KC) big bands often played by memory, composing and arranging the music collectively, rather than sight-reading as other big bands of the time did. This further contributed to the loose, spontaneous Kansas City sound.
- A heavy blues influence, with KC songs often based around a 12-bar blues structure, rather than the 32-bar AABA standard (although Moten Swing is in this AABA format).
- One of the most recognizable characteristics of Kansas City jazz is frequent, elaborate riffing by the different sections. Riffs were often created or improvised collectively, and took many forms: one section riffing alone as the main focus of the music; one section riffing behind a soloist, adding excitement to the song; or two or more sections riffing in counterpoint, creating a rousing, complex sound. The Count Basie signature tunes "One O'Clock Jump" and "Jumpin' at the Woodside", for example, are mainly collections of riffs, memorized in a head arrangement, and punctuated with solos. Glenn Miller's famous swing anthem "In the Mood" closely follows this Kansas City pattern of riffing sections, perhaps exemplifying how, by the late 1930s, the style had gone on to influence the larger musical world.

== Notable people ==
- Count Basie
- Earl Caruthers
- Buck Clayton
- Maxwell Davis
- Herschel Evans
- Coleman Hawkins
- Pete Johnson
- Jo Jones
- Andy Kirk
- King Kolax
- Julia Lee
- George E. Lee
- Harlan Leonard
- Jimmie Lunceford
- Jay McShann
- Bennie Moten
- Hot Lips Page
- Walter Page
- Charlie Parker
- Sammy Price
- Jimmy Rushing
- Big Joe Turner
- Ben Webster
- Claude Williams
- Mary Lou Williams
- Lester Young

== Selected discography ==
Early jazz and swing era music:

- Various artists, The Real Kansas City of the 20's, 30's & 40's, Columbia/Legacy (1996)
- Various artists, Jazz - Kansas City Style, Topaz Jazz/Pearl (1996)
- Various artists, The Cradle of Jazz, The International Music Co. (2000) 2CD
- Various artists, Kansas City Jazz 1924-1942, Frémeaux & Associés [France] (2005) 2CD

== Legacy ==
Jazzoo is an annual charity fundraiser for the Kansas City Zoo, dedicated to Kansas City jazz. In 2011, Jazzoo was one of the nation's largest charity fundraisers, raising over $800,000.
