= Ada Brown (singer) =

American blues singer (1890–1950)

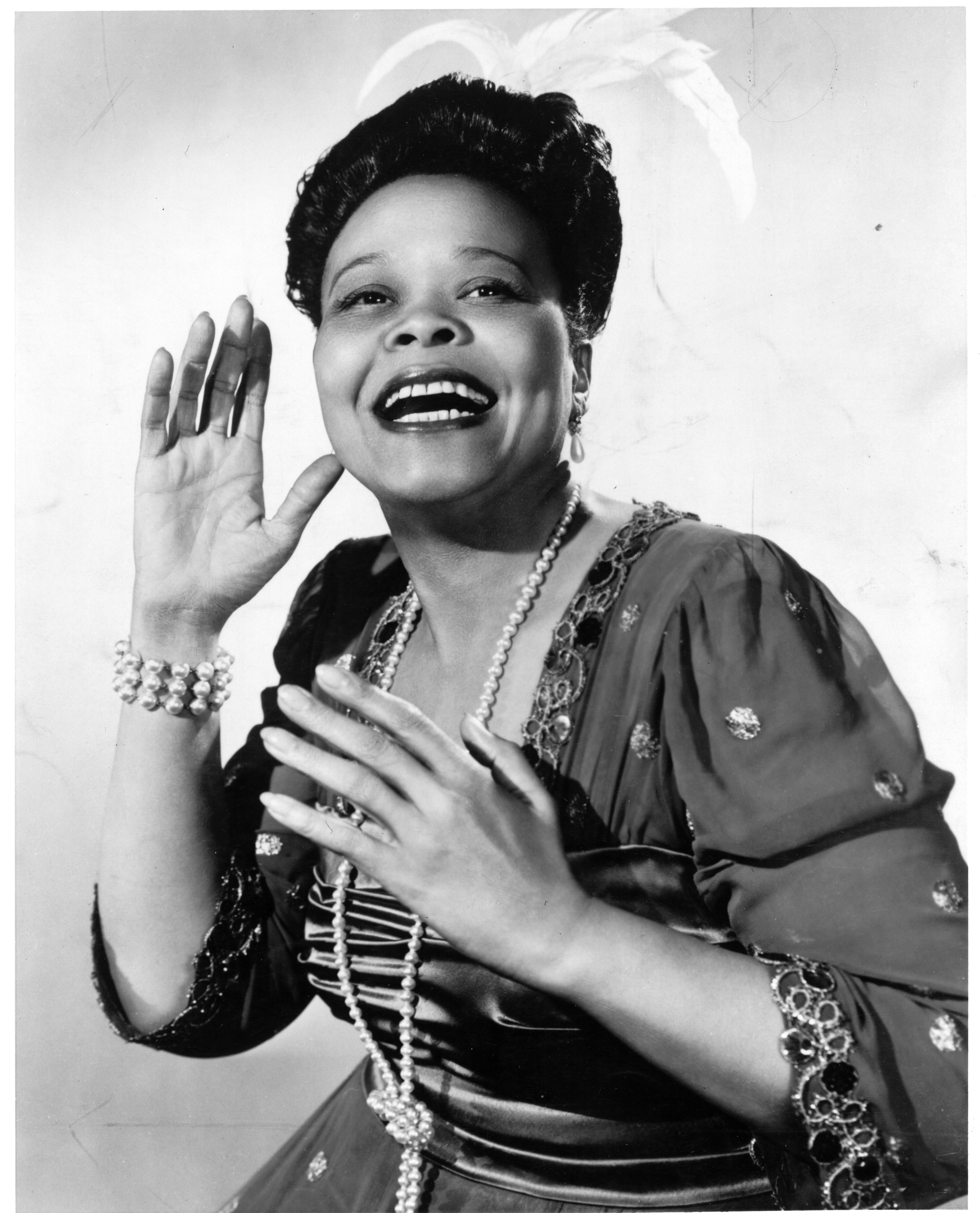

Background information
- Born: Ada Scott Brown; May 1, 1890; Kansas City, Kansas, United States
- Died: March 30, 1950 (aged 59) Kansas City, Kansas, United States
- Genre: Blues
- Occupation: Singer
- Years active: 1919–1950

Ada Scott Brown (May 1, 1890 – March 30, 1950) was an American blues and jazz singer and actress. She is best known for her recordings of "Ill Natural Blues," "Break o' Day Blues," and "Evil Mama Blues."

== Biography ==
Brown was born and raised in Kansas City, Kansas. She was born into a musically inclined family, and grew up singing in church as a child. In 1910, she was able to successfully launch her career at Bob Motts' Pekin Theatre in Chicago. Her cousin James Scott was a ragtime composer and pianist. Her early career was spent primarily on stage in musical theater and vaudeville. She worked in clubs in Paris and Berlin before beginning to focus on recording. She recorded with Bennie Moten and Mary H. Bradford in 1923; the track "Evil Mama Blues" is possibly the earliest recording of Kansas City jazz. Aside from her time with Moten, she did several tours alongside bandleaders such as George E. Lee. Her tours took place in theaters through the United States and Canada. During this time, Brown also appeared in black revues and musical comedies up and down Broadway.

Brown was a founding member of the Negro Actors Guild of America in 1936. with the goal of eliminating the stereotyping of African Americans in theatrical and cinematic performances. She worked with Fredi Washington, Leigh Whipper, and others to provide financial and social resources for African American entertainers. She worked at the London Palladium and on Broadway in the late 1930s. She sang "That Ain't Right" with Fats Waller in the musical film Stormy Weather (1943).

Brown was regularly reviewed in the black press from 1920 to 1929 as her career continued to grow in vaudeville theaters. Unlike country bluesmen who accompanied themselves on acoustic guitar and harmonica, she worked with jazz pianists to give her songs a beat. Her style of blues was known as “blues wedded to jazz.” She also appeared in Harlem to Hollywood, accompanied by pianist Harry Swannagan. Brown was featured on two tracks of the compilation album Ladies Sing the Blues ("Break o' Day Blues" and "Evil Mama Blues"). One of her last appearances was in Memphis Bound, shortly before her retirement.

Brown died in Kansas City of kidney disease in March 1950.

== Discography ==
Title	Other Artists	Record Label	Year
"Chattanooga Blues"	Bennie Moten Orchestra	Okeh Recording Company	1923
"Evil Mama Blues"	Bennie Moten Orchestra	Okeh Recording Company	1923
"Ill-Natured Blues"	Bennie Moten Orchestra	Okeh Recording Company	1923
"Break O’Day Blues"	Bennie Moten Orchestra	Okeh Recording Company	1924
"Waco Texas Blues"	Bennie Moten Orchestra	Okeh Recording Company	1924
"Tia Juana Blues"	Luis Russell & Orchestra	Classics Records	1926
"Panama Limited Blues"	Luis Russell & Orchestra	Classics Records	1926
"Down Home Dance"	Porter Grainger	Okeh Recording Company	1929
"Crazy ‘Bout My Lollypop"	Porter Grainger	Okeh Recording Company	1929
"That Ain’t Right"	Fats Weller	V-Disc	1943
