= South (composition) =

"South" is a jazz composition by Thamon Hayes and Bennie Moten. It was introduced by Bennie Moten's Kansas City Orchestra in 1924 and recorded again in 1928, when it became a national hit. It was Moten's most popular composition.

Originally an instrumental piece, Ray Charles (a pseudonym for Charles Carpenter) later wrote lyrics for the tune.
