= Mary Bradford =

Mary Bradford may refer to:

- Mary C. C. Bradford (1856–1938), first woman to be elected to a seat in the 1908 Democratic National Convention
- Mary D. Bradford (1856–1943), first woman in Wisconsin, USA to serve as Superintendent of a major city school system
- Mary H. Bradford, American blues singer, songwriter, composer, and lyricist
- Mary Lythgoe Bradford (1930–2022), American editor and poet significant to Mormon literature
