= Earl Carruthers =

American jazz musician

- Birth name: Earl Malcolm Caruthers
- Also known as: Jock
- Born: May 27, 1910; Monroe County, Mississippi, U.S.
- Died: April 5, 1971 (aged 60); Kansas City, Kansas, U.S.
- Genres: Jazz, Kansas City jazz
- Instruments: Saxophone

Earl Malcolm "Jock" Caruthers Sr. (May 27, 1910 – April 5, 1971) was an American jazz saxophonist associated with the Kansas City jazz scene.

== Early life and education ==
Born in Monroe County, Mississippi, Caruthers studied at Fisk University in the 1920s.

== Career ==
Carruthers began playing in Bennie Moten's ensemble in 1928. He worked in St. Louis, Missouri early in the next decade with Dewey Jackson and Fate Marable, then joined the band of Jimmie Lunceford in 1932. He recorded with Lunceford often and remained a member of his orchestra until Lunceford's death in 1947.

Caruthers played with Joe Thomas and Ed Wilcox. He later worked as a milkman at Meyers Sanitary Milk through the 1960s.

== Personal life ==
Earl Caruthers died in Kansas City. He had three children.
