= Jonah Jones =

American jazz musician (1909–2000)

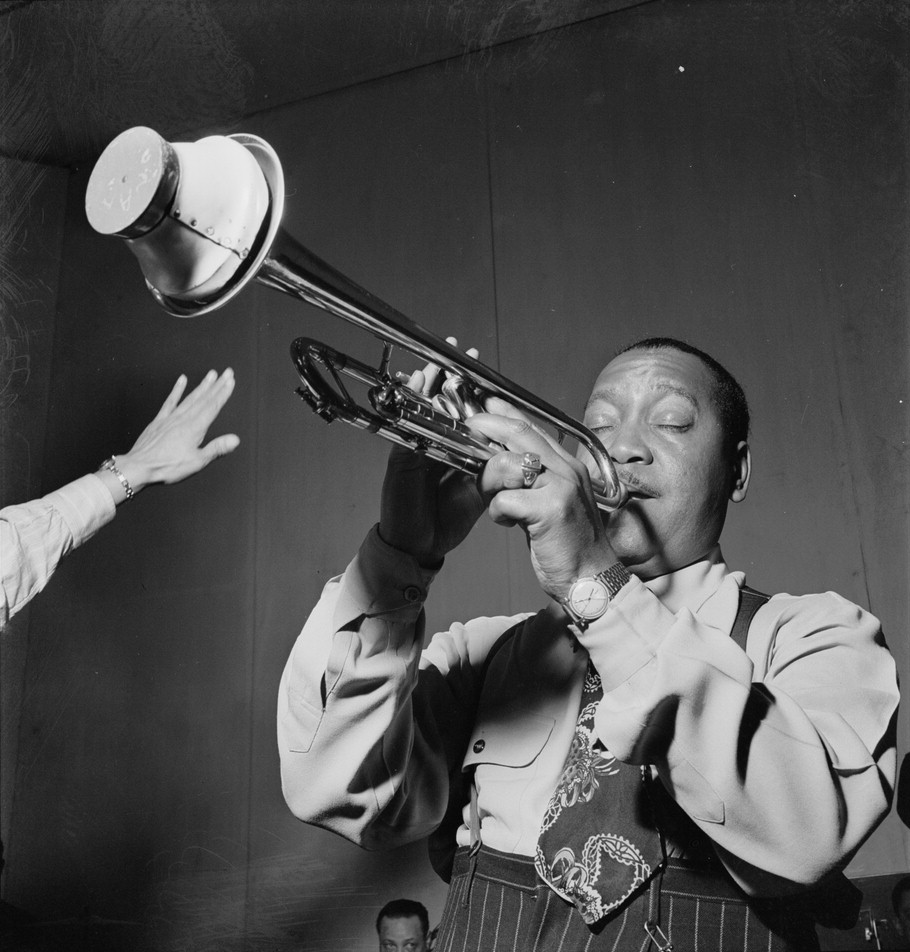
- Jones, ca. March 1947

Background information
- Also known as: King Louis II
- Born: Robert Elliott Jones; December 31, 1909; Louisville, Kentucky, U.S.
- Died: April 30, 2000 (aged 90) New York City, U.S.
- Genres: Jazz, swing, boogie-woogie, jump blues
- Occupation: Musician
- Instruments: Trumpet, alto saxophone
- Years active: 1920s–2000
- Labels: Capitol, Decca, Motown

Jonah Jones (born Robert Elliott Jones; December 31, 1909 – April 30, 2000) was a jazz trumpeter who created concise versions of jazz and swing and jazz standards that appealed to a mass audience. In the jazz community, he is known for his work with Stuff Smith. He was sometimes referred to as "King Louis II", a reference to Louis Armstrong. Jones started playing alto saxophone at the age of 12 in the Booker T. Washington Community Center band in Louisville, Kentucky, before quickly transitioning to trumpet, where he excelled.

== Early life ==
Jones was born in Louisville, Kentucky, United States. An early music instructor stuttered when stating Jones' surname, and so Jones became known as 'Jonah'. He attended Central High School.

== Career ==
Jones began his career playing on a river boat named Island Queen, which traveled between Kentucky and Ohio. He began in the 1920s playing on Mississippi riverboats and then, in 1928, he joined with Horace Henderson. Later he worked with Jimmie Lunceford and had an early collaboration with Stuff Smith in 1932. From 1932 to 1936, he had a successful collaboration with Smith, but in the 1940s he worked in big bands like Benny Carter's and Fletcher Henderson's. He would spend most of a decade with Cab Calloway's band which later became a combo.

Starting in the 1950s, he had his own quartet and began concentrating on a formula which gained him wider appeal for a decade. The quartet consisted of George "River Rider" Rhodes on piano, John "Broken Down" Browne on bass and Harold "Hard Nuts" Austin on drums. The most-mentioned accomplishment of this style is their version of "On The Street Where You Live", a strong-swinging treatment of the Broadway tune with a boogie-woogie jump blues feeling. This effort succeeded and he began to be known to a wider audience. This led to his quartet performing on An Evening With Fred Astaire in 1958, and an award at the Grammy Awards of 1960, receiving the Grammy Award for Best Jazz Instrumental Album. In 1972, he made a return to more "core" jazz work with Earl Hines on the Chiaroscuro album Back On The Street. Jones enjoyed especial popularity in France, being featured in a jazz festival in the Salle Pleyel.

A 1996 videotaped interview completed by Dan Del Fiorentino was donated to the NAMM Oral History Program Collection in 2010 to preserve his music for future generations.

Jones performed in the orchestra pit under the direction of Alexander Smallens and briefly in an onstage musical sequence of Porgy and Bess, starring Cab Calloway.

He was inducted into the Big Band and Jazz Hall of Fame in 1999 and died the following year in New York City, at the age of 90.

== Family ==
Jonah Jones married the trumpeter, clarinetist and hornist Elizabeth Bowles (1910–1993), sister of Russell Bowles. They had four children.

== Discography ==
=== As leader ===
- Jonah Jones at the Embers (RCA, 1956)
- Muted Jazz (Capitol, 1957)
- Jazz Kaleidoscope (Bethlehem, 1957)
- Jumpin' with Jonah (Capitol, 1958)
- Swingin' at the Cinema (Capitol, 1958)
- Swingin' on Broadway (Capitol, 1958)
- Jonah Jumps Again (Capitol, 1959)
- I Dig Chicks (Capitol, 1959)
- Swingin' Around the World (Capitol, 1959)
- Hit Me Again! (Capitol, 1960)
- The Greatest Dixieland Ever (Guest Star, 1960)
- A Touch of Blue (Capitol, 1960), production by Dave Cavanaugh
- The Unsinkable Jonah Jones Swings the Unsinkable Molly Brown (Capitol, 1961)
- Jumpin' with a Shuffle (Capitol, 1961)
- Great Instrumental Hits Styled by Jonah Jones (Capitol, 1961)
- Broadway Swings Again (Capitol, 1961)
- Jonah Jones Quartet/Glen Gray Casa Loma Orchestra (Capitol, 1962)
- Jazz Bonus (Capitol, 1962)
- Trumpet On Tour (Baronet, 1962)
- And Now in Person Jonah Jones (Capitol, 1963)
- That Righteous Feelin' (Capitol, 1963)
- Jonah Jones Swings Etta Jones Sings (Crown, 1964)
- Blowin' Up a Storm (Capitol, 1964)
- Hello Broadway (Decca, 1965)
- Double Exposure (Ember, 1965)
- On the Sunny Side of the Street (Decca, 1965)
- Sweet with a Beat (Decca, 1966)
- Tijuana Taxi (Decca, 1966)
- Good Time Medleys (Decca, 1967)
- Squeeze Me and Other Favorites (Brunswick, 1968)
- Along Came Jonah (Motown, 1968)
- A Little Dis, a Little Dat (Motown, 1969)
- Back On the Street with Earl Hines, Buddy Tate, Cozy Cole (Chiaroscuro, 1972)
- Confessin' (Black and Blue, 1978)

=== As sideman ===
- Sidney Bechet, The Fabulous Sidney Bechet (Blue Note, 1984)
- Sam Price, Barrelhouse and Blues (Jazztone, 1955)
- Dakota Staton, The Late Late Show (Capitol, 1957)
