= Pearl Theatre =

Pearl Theatre may refer to:

- Pearl Concert Theatre of Palms Casino Resort, Las Vegas
- Pearl Theatre (Philadelphia)
- Pearl Theatre (New York City)
