= Meritt Records (1925) =

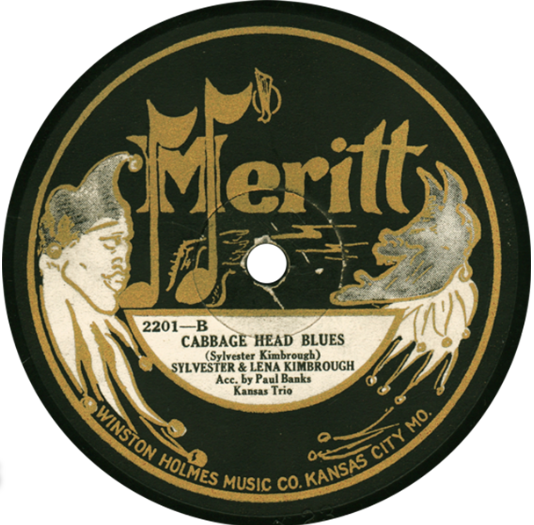
- Founded: 1925
- Founder: Winston Holmes
- Defunct: 1929
- Genre: Jazz and Blues
- Country of origin: US
- Location: Kansas City, Missouri

Meritt Records was an American jazz and blues record company and label that existed from 1925 to 1929. It was founded in Kansas City by Winston Holmes, the owner of a music store. Records were made in his studio and sold only in his store.

Holmes produced about 20 double-sided acoustically recorded phonograph records in the mid and late 1920s. Most of the sides are of locally based jazz and blues performers, plus some gospel music and sermons.

== Partial discography ==
=== 1926 ===
- 2201: "City of the Dead" / "Cabbage Head Blues"

Lena Kimbrough / Sylvester (her brother) & Lena Kimbrough

- 2203: "I've Even Heard of Thee" / "The Downfall of Nebuchadnezzer"

Rev. J.C. Burnett

- 2204: "The Well of Salvation"

Rev. H.C. Gatewood

=== 1927 ===
- 2206: "Down Home Syncopated Blues" / "Meritt Stomp"

George E. Lee And His Novelty Singing Orchestra (George E. Lee, ts, v, dir: Sam Utterbach, t / Thurston Maupins, tb / Clarence Taylor, ss, as / Jesse Stone, p, a / George Rousseau, bj / Clint Weaver, bb / Abe Price, d / Julia Lee, v.)

== See also ==
- List of record labels
