= Lottie Kimbrough =

American singer (born 1893)

- Also known as: Lottie Beaman; "The Kansas City Butterball"; Lottie Kimborough; Lena Kimbrough; Clara Cary; Jennie Brooks; Lottie Brown; Lottie Emerson; Mae Moran; Martha Jackson
- Born: 1893 or 1900; Jonesboro, Arkansas, U.S. or West Bottoms, Kansas City, Missouri, U.S.
- Died: Unknown
- Genres: Country blues
- Occupations: Singer; songwriter
- Instrument: Vocals
- Years active: 1920s
- Labels: Paramount; Meritt; Gennett; Champion; Supertone; Superior

Lottie Kimbrough (born 1893 or 1900; date of death unknown) was an American country blues singer, who was also billed as Lottie Beaman (her married name), Lottie Kimborough, and Lena Kimbrough (among several other names).

She was a large woman and was nicknamed "The Kansas City Butterball". Her recording career lasted from 1924 to 1929.

The music journalist Burgin Mathews wrote that "Kimbrough's vocal power, and the unique arrangements of several of her best pieces, rank her as one of the sizable talents of the 1920s blues tradition."

== Biography ==
Kimbrough was born in either Jonesboro, Arkansas, or West Bottoms, Kansas City, Missouri, and had close links with the Kansas City community. By 1915 she was using the name Lottie Mitchell, and by 1920 she had married William Beaman.

Her music career began in the early 1920s, when she performed in nightclubs and speakeasies in Kansas City. Her career was managed by Winston Holmes, a local musician and music promoter. In 1924 she undertook her first recording session, for Paramount Records, where she was recorded alongside Ma Rainey.

Her earliest recordings were made with the accompaniment of the twins Millus and Myles Pruitt (or Pruett) (banjo and guitar, respectively). She was later backed by Jimmy Blythe (piano). In 1925 she shared recording studio space with Papa Charlie Jackson. The same year she cut some tracks for Meritt Records, owned by Holmes.

Kimbrough recorded and performed using a number of pseudonyms. She used her married name, Lottie Beaman, on almost half of her tracks, but for her 1926 recording sessions Holmes suggested that she be renamed Lena Kimbrough. He also used a photograph of her more photogenic sister, Estella, for publicity. Kimbrough also appeared billed as Clara Cary and as Mae Moran. She further recorded in Richmond, Indiana, and pseudonyms were used for issues by Gennett Records, Champion Records (which billed her as Lottie Emerson), Supertone Records (as Lottie Brown) and Superior Records (as Martha Jackson). Her Gennett sessions produced the tracks "Rolling Log Blues" and "Goin' Away Blues", which the music journalist Tony Russell described as having "haunting beauty".

Kimbrough's brother Sylvester appeared with her in vaudeville, and in 1926 he supplied recording accompaniment for Paul Banks's Kansas City Trio. However, Kimbrough's musical collaboration with Holmes produced her better-known recordings. Holmes supplied yodels and vocalised bird calls and train whistles on "Lost Lover Blues" and "Wayward Girl Blues" (1928). Myles Pruitt participated in this recording and was a regular partner throughout Kimbrough's recording and concert career. He was featured again when Kimbrough recorded her final session, in November 1929.

"Rolling Log Blues", one of the songs she wrote, has been recorded by Jo Ann Kelly, Woody Mann, Son House, the Blues Band, Rory Block, Eric Bibb, Maria Muldaur, and Buffy Sainte-Marie.

Little is known of her life beyond her recording career.

== Selected compilation albums ==
- Lottie Kimbrough & Winston Holmes (1928–1929), Wolf, 1984
- Lottie Beaman (Kimbrough) 1924/1926 and Luela Miller 1928, Wolf, 1988
- Kansas City Blues 1924–1929, Document, 1993

== See also ==
- List of country blues musicians
