= Sweet jazz =

Music genre

- Other names: Sweet band; sweet orchestra; sweet music; straight jazz; symphonic jazz
- Stylistic origins: Dixieland jazz; blues; dance band; orchestral music
- Cultural origins: Mid-1910s, United States
- Derivative forms: Big band; orchestral jazz; vocal jazz

Other topics
- Trad jazz; lounge; smooth jazz

Sweet jazz is an early derivative form of jazz which adapts the blues-based harmony, syncopated rhythms, and complex arrangements of Dixieland jazz to a popular dance band format with a slower, straighter rhythmic framework which allowed it to find popularity with white American and European audiences in the early 1920s. Though considered the height of sophistication in the genre by some critics at the time, the sweet jazz style has long been criticized as inauthentic and generic compared to "hot" jazz, and by some later critics has even been excluded from the category of jazz altogether due to the reduced role of improvisation and the general lack of swing time.

Sweet jazz was typically performed by an early big band ensemble known as a sweet band or sweet orchestra, which typically incorporated a string section alongside brass, woodwinds, piano, percussion, and more distinctive instruments like the banjo or marimba. The sweet jazz genre emerged as early as 1914, and was highly popular on record and radio through the mid-1920s and even into the 1930s as an alternate popular form of jazz in the swing era.

== Name ==
The "sweet" moniker was originally coined to contrast the melodic sound of the sweet bands with the highly energetic and cacophonous improvisation of New Orleans' "hot" jazz. For many contemporary white critics, the name was an indication of its melodic accessibility and refined structure, but the term was also used by some musicians and critics as a mocking, somewhat derogatory term for a style they saw as more generic and less spirited. The most popular sweet bandleader, the so-called "King of Jazz" Paul Whiteman, preferred to describe his ensemble's music as "symphonic jazz".

== Style ==
Sweet jazz is notably distinguished from "hot" Dixieland jazz by its slower tempos and more "square" rhythms with less swing, tending towards a highly melodic and sentimental sound that lends the genre its name. Sweet band repertoires included lightly syncopated dances like the foxtrot and instrumental renditions of Tin Pan Alley songs, though some bands eventually incorporated singers for vocal chorus sections, in an early form of vocal jazz.

Saxophone sections in sweet bands frequently employed a wide, sustained vibrato applied from the very onset of a note and held throughout its duration. Carmen Lombardo, saxophonist and musical director of Guy Lombardo and His Royal Canadians, had trained originally as a flautist, and is credited with transferring a flute-derived vibrato technique to the saxophone, producing the wide, singing tone that became the signature sound of the orchestra's sax section. A similarly pronounced, "quavering" saxophone vibrato was the trademark sound of Jan Garber's orchestra, one of the most commercially successful sweet bands of the 1930s, while Freddy Martin's orchestra was known for what jazz historian George T. Simon described as its "soft, moaning" saxophone sound, with Simon grouping Lombardo, Garber, and Wayne King together as the era's leading "extrasweet" bandleaders on the basis of this shared saxophone-section style.

Sweet bandleaders tended to be white and had training in classical music, with Paul Whiteman himself having been a symphony orchestra violinist before encountering jazz in 1915. Whiteman and his peers aspired to elevate jazz to a more respected form of concert music, seeking to make it less "primitive" and more structured. This attitude culminated in the 1924 premiere of George Gershwin's Rhapsody in Blue by Whiteman's band at Aeolian Hall which fully transcended the popular sweet jazz idiom as a classical rhapsody with some jazz elements.

Despite their reputation and the development of a distinctive sweet jazz style, most sweet-oriented jazz dance bands tended to have diverse repertoires that could also include "hot" jazz soloists, like Bix Beiderbecke in Whiteman's orchestra. Although sweet jazz was a predominantly white style, it was also performed by black groups like Fletcher Henderson's.

== Popularity and influence ==
Sweet bands were highly commercially successful in the 1920s, performing in concert settings for urban society and touring as dance bands across the United States. Many of the earliest jazz recordings were of sweet bands, which sold well with white audiences in America and Europe and consequently became highly influential on how jazz was seen by mainstream culture in the early Jazz Age. The sweet jazz sound became closely associated with the accompaniment of hotel bands and theater bands.

Sweet jazz was also influential on European dance bands, who blended its approach with local folk dances.

== Prominent sweet bandleaders ==
- Art Hickman
- Paul Whiteman
- Guy Lombardo
- Les Brown
- Ben Selvin
- Ted Lewis
- Vincent Lopez
- Fletcher Henderson
- Louis Armstrong (with his Orchestra)
- Glenn Miller
- Blue Barron
- Eddie Duchin
- Shep Fields
