= Eliana Pittman =

Brazilian actress and singer

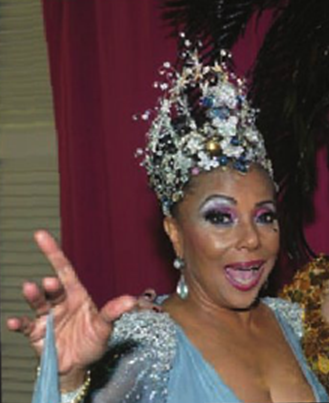
- Eliana Pittman at Carnaval in 2013
- Born: Eliana Leite Da Silva; August 14, 1945 (age 81); Rio de Janeiro, Brazil
- Occupations: Singer; actress
- Years active: 1960–2026
- Musical career
- Genres: Jazz
- Instrument: Vocals

Eliana Pittman (born Eliana Leite da Silva; August 14, 1945) is a Brazilian singer and actress. Considered one of the more soulful Brazilian vocalists of the early 1970s, Pittman is the stepdaughter of jazz saxophonist Booker Pittman. He was her first music teacher, mentor, and recording partner, playing a significant role in shaping her artistic path.

With a distinctive swinging voice and intensity in her style, Pittman was a brilliant scat singer who turned insipid novelty tunes and light pop into definitive, jazz based treatment. Her first great hit was Tristeza, recorded in 1966, which gained her instant recognition in South America, though she never had a huge hit like Astrud Gilberto's Garota de Ipanema. During the 60s and 70s, she toured throughout Brazil, Italy, France, Japan, US, Spain and Venezuela. In 2001, Pittman opened a new tour starting from Rio de Janeiro. Since then, she has been alternating moments of reclusion and some activity as a TV actress.

== Selected discography ==
- Eliana & Booker Pittman – News From Brazil (Odeon/Paradise Masters, Brazil, 1963)
- É Preciso Cantar (Copacabana, Brazil, 1966)
- Positivamente, Eliana (Rozenblit, Brazil, 1968)
- Eliana Ao Vivo (Copacabana, Brazil, 1968)
- Estrela É Lua Nova (RGE/Fermata, Brazil, 1969)
- Eliana Pittman (Odeon/EMI, Brazil, 1971)
- Eliana Pittman (Odeon/EMI, Brazil, 1972)
- Tô Chegando, Já Cheguei (RCA, Brazil, 1974)
- Pra Sempre (RCA, Brazil, 1976)
- Quem Vai Querer (RCA, Brazil, 1977)
- Minha Melhor Melodia (RCA, Brazil, 1978)
- Abandono (RCA, Brazil, 1979)
- Soul Of Brazil – Funk, Soul, & Bossa Grooves 1965 to 1977 (EMI/Odeon, France, late 1970s)

== Selected filmography ==
- 1966 Run for Your Life as singer
- 1971 The Sandpit Generals as Dalvah
- 1986 Jubiabá
- 2005 América as Rainha do Forró
- 2010 Tempos Modernos as Miranda Paranhos
- 2012 Preamar as Da Guia
- 2013 Sangue Bom as Chica
- 2019 Girls from Ipanema as Elza
- 2022 Sob Pressão as Muriel

== Sources ==
- Dusty Groove
- Eliana Pittman at IMDb
- Loronix blog spot
