= The Legendary Buster Smith =

Studio album by Buster Smith
- Released: August 15, 1959 (Record); October 19, 1999 (CD)
- Recorded: June 7, 1959; Fort Worth, Texas
- Genre: Jazz
- Label: Atlantic (1959); Koch (1999)
- Producer: Donald Elfman & Naomi Yoshii (1999)

Professional ratings
Review scores
Source	Rating
Allmusic	4.5/5 stars

The Legendary Buster Smith is the debut and only solo album released by American saxophonist Buster Smith, recorded and released in 1959. The album features five original compositions by Smith, alongside versions of "September Song" by Kurt Weill and "Organ Grinder’s Swing" by Will Hudson.

== Background ==
In 1959, after several years of suggestion by Atlantic Records, alto saxophonist Buster Smith put together a band to perform a session of Jazz pieces. The album was recorded in a single studio session on June 7, 1959 and was released the next month on August 15. The lineup featured mostly Dallas based musicians, including Smith's own brother Boston Smith.

The album was digitally remastered, remixed and produced in 1999 and released for the first time on compact disc on October 19 of that year.

== Track listing ==
1. "Buster's Tune" – 3:35
2. "E Flat Boogie" – 6:53
3. "September Song" (Maxwell Anderson, Kurt Weill) – 3:52
4. "King Alcohol" – 4:34
5. "Kansas City Riffs" – 5:17
6. "Late Late" – 7:42
7. "Organ Grinder's Swing" (Will Hudson) – 6:35

All compositions by Buster Smith except as indicated.

== Personnel ==
=== Performing musicians ===
- Henry "Buster" Smith - Alto saxophone and guitar
- Eddie Cadell - Tenor saxophone
- Leroy "Hog" Cooper - Baritone saxophone
- Charles Gillum - Trumpet
- Clinton Smith - Trombone
- Herman Flowers or Boston Smith - Piano
- Josea Smith - Bass
- Robert Cobbs - Drums

=== Production ===
- Robert Sullivan - Engineer
- Gunther Schuller - Liner notes
- Donald Elfman - 1999 Reissue producer
- Naomi Yoshii - 1999 Reissue producer
