= Jack Washington =

American jazz saxophonist

Ronald "Jack" Washington (July 17, 1910 – November 28, 1964) was an American jazz saxophonist who was a member of the Count Basie orchestra in the 1930s and 1940s.

== Life and career ==
Born in Kansas City, Kansas, he started playing soprano saxophone in his teens before switching to baritone.

He began his professional career with the pianist Paul Banks and then toured the Midwest with Jesse Stone's Blues Serenaders.

He joined Bennie Moten's Orchestra in summer 1927.

After Moten's death in 1935, he joined Count Basie's band and remained with Basie until 1950 except for a short period in the U.S. Army. He performed with the Basie band at the From Spirituals to Swing concerts in New York City in 1938 and 1939.

He later moved to Oklahoma City, where he worked at the city airport. He continued to perform on an occasional basis and took part in a reunion of the Basie orchestra in 1958. He died in Oklahoma City in 1964 at the age of 54.

== Discography ==
With Count Basie

- The Original American Decca Recordings (GRP, 1992)

With Paul Quinichette

- Basie Reunion (Prestige, 1958)
