= Jonah Jumps Again =

Studio album by Jonah Jones
- Released: 1959
- Genre: Jazz
- Label: Capitol T1115

Jonah Jones chronology
Swingin' at the Cinema (1958)	Jonah Jumps Again (1959)	The Jonah Jones Quartet at The Embers (1959)

Professional ratings
Review scores
Source	Rating
AllMusic	3/5 stars

Jonah Jumps Again is a 1959 album by Jonah Jones and his quartet.

Jonah Jumps Again was chosen as one of Billboard magazine's 'Spotlight Winners of the Week' upon its release in February 1959, commenting that "Jonah Jones should continue his string of hit albums with this swinging, hit, set. ...it features the wonderful trumpet work of Jones and an occasional bright vocal, plus fine backing by the other members of the quartet."

== Track listing ==
1. "Jalousie" (Vera Bloom, Jacob Gade) – 2:46
2. "I'll Always Be in Love With You" (Bud Green, Herman Ruby, Sam H. Stept) – 2:41
3. "Pennies from Heaven" (Johnny Burke, Arthur Johnston) – 2:08
4. "Ballin' the Jack" (Jim Burris, Chris Smith) – 2:59
5. "I'm in the Market for You" (James F. Hanley, Joseph McCarthy) – 2:17
6. "Any Time" (Herbert "Happy" Lawson) – 2:15
7. "From the Inside" – 2:15
8. "They Can't Take That Away from Me" (George Gershwin, Ira Gershwin) – 2:50
9. "Slowly But Surely" – 2:11
10. "Poor Butterfly" (Raymond Hubbell, John Golden) – 2:58
11. "No Fool Like an Old Fool" – 2:29
12. "Similau" (Arden Clar, Harry Coleman) – 2:28

== Personnel ==
The Jonah Jones Quartet

- Jonah Jones – trumpet, vocals
- Teddy Brannon – piano (all tracks but #4)
- Hank Jones – piano (track #4)
- John Brown – bass
- George 'Pops' Foster – drums (all tracks but No. 4 & #9)
- Harold Austin – drums (tracks No. 4 & #9)
