= Eddie Durham's All-Star Girl Orchestra =

African-American all-female band

- Genres: Jazz
- Years active: 1943–1945

Eddie Durham's All-Star Girl Orchestra was an African-American all-female band started by arranger Eddie Durham in January 1942. By November, the All-Stars were a part of Moe Gale's New York agency. The group was also known as "Eddie Durham's All-Girl Band" and performed throughout the country and internationally. The All-Stars typically had between eighteen and twenty-two members and pulled musicians from other popular bands of the time, including The Harlem Playgirls and The International Sweethearts of Rhythm.

== History ==
=== Popularity ===
Starting July 9, 1943, the All-Star Girl Orchestra traveled throughout the United States and Canada performing, with concerts at cities, such as Columbus, South Carolina and Atlanta, Georgia and USO dates. The All-Stars were very popular during World War II and performed at United Service Organization (USO) Camp Shows. They dedicated at least one night per week on the war effort and their activities included raising war bonds, uplifting morale, and performing at military camps and USO centers. During their time together, they performed at seventy-two army camps throughout Canada. Unlike other bands that struggled to find funding during restrictive war times, the All-Stars had luxury buses adapt with hot and cold water, air conditioning, and sleeping accommodations. The band also received government supplied gas coupons. They had enough money because of Mary McLeod Bethune. She was the founder of the National Council of Negro Women and Bethune-Cook College. Mary McLeod Bethune received permission from Eleanor Roosevelt to allow the bus to travel anywhere. The All-Stars played at popular venues including the Paramount Theater, Apollo Theater, and Howard Theater, and were even invited to perform on Broadway in New York City. The All-Stars were repeat guests at the Apollo Theater. They performed in 1942 in February, September, and June, October 1943, and April 1944. At times, they performed with other popular acts including Ella Fitzgerald, Moms Mabley, and comedian duo Butterbeans and Susie.

=== Folding ===
In 1945, after VJ day, the All-Stars were supposed to perform at Sweets' Ballroom in Oakland, California. After performing for one week, they disbanded because the male musicians were returning to the United States. Durham ensured each member returned home. Durham trained singer Jean Parks to take over the All-Stars. The band was then titled Jean Parks's All Star-Girl Band. However, the band officially ended less than a year later after Parks fell ill. Many of the former All-Star members went on to join other bands, including Lorraine Brown Guilford's Darlings of Rhythm.

== Line Up ==
The line-up of the All-Stars changed throughout its history.

- Dolly Jones Armenra - Trumpet
- Edna Williams - Trumpet
- Jean Starr - Trumpet
- Nova Lee McGee - Trumpet
- Thelma Lewis - Trumpet
- Flo Jones - Trumpet
- Lela Julius- Trombone
- Jessie Turner - Trombone
- Sammy Lee Jett - Trombone
- Ellarize Thompson - Alto Saxophone, Flute, Clarinet, and Violin
- Alma Cortez - Baritone Saxophone
- Lorraine Brown Guilford - Saxophone
- Josephine Boyd- Saxophone
- Margaret Backstreet "Padjo" - Saxophone
- Edith Farthing - Upright Bass
- Violet "Vi" M. Wilson - Bass

== See also ==
- Darlings of Rhythm
- Mary McLeod Bethune
- The International Sweethearts of Rhythm
