= Darlings of Rhythm =

The Darlings of Rhythm was an African American, all-female swing band from the 1940s.

The Darlings were often compared with the International Sweethearts of Rhythm, another African American all-girl swing band. The Darlings were darker skinned than the Sweethearts. Toby Butler, a white member of the International Sweethearts of Rhythm, was rumored to have left the band and joined the Darlings in the mid-1940s, when racial segregation made playing in mixed bands illegal. This rumor was confirmed in 1946 when she was arrested while performing in Georgia.

== Band members ==
Members of the Darlings changed over time, and included the following:

- Clarence Love (leader)
- Jean Ray Lee (trumpeter)
- Thelma Lewis (trumpeter)
- Helen Taborn (vocalist)
- Frann Gaddison (saxophonist)
- Jessie Turner (trombonist)
- Josephine Boyd (alto saxophonist)
- Margaret "Padjo" Backstrom (tenor saxophonist)
- Henrietta Fontaine (drummer)
- Lula Roberts (saxophonist)
- Vi Wilson (bass)
- Hettie Smith (drummer)
- Gurthalee Clark (reeds)
- Ann Cooper (trumpeter)

== History ==
The Darlings were formed in 1943 in Harlem by African American tenor and baritone saxophonist Lorraine Brown.

Several of the band members joined the Darlings after leaving other bands. Cooper, Gaddison and Vi Wilson joined the Darlings after leaving the International Sweethearts of Rhythm. Wilson joined the group to be with her cousin, reeds player Gurthalee Clark. Trombonist Jessie Turner and tenor saxophonist Margaret Backstrom left Eddie Durham's All Star Girl Orchestra for the Darlings.

In 1945, drummer Hettie Smith replaced Henrietta Fontaine.

The bassist, drummer, and saxophonist for the Darlings later went to the Syncoettes band. Some members from the Darlings also went to Tiny Davis's Hell Divers.

== See also ==
- Harlem Playgirls
- Ina Ray Hutton
- Melodears
- Prairie View Co-eds
- Eddie Durham's All-Star Girls Orchestra
