= Golden Gate Ballroom =

Ballroom in Harlem

- Address: New York City; United States

The Golden Gate Ballroom, originally named the "State Palace Ballroom", was a luxurious ballroom located at the intersection of Lenox Avenue and 142nd Street (Note: Korall says it was on 135th Street. Kernodle says 140th street. Perhaps it spanned all of these?) in Harlem in New York City. It was allegedly the largest public auditorium in Harlem, with 25,000 square feet and a capacity of about 5,000 people on the dance floor in addition to several thousand spectators.

== History ==
The serial entrepreneur Jay Faggen led the project to open the Golden Gate Ballroom, which took place in October 1939. The site had formerly been the Douglas Theater. By mid-1940, it was taken over by the same owner and manager as the Savoy Ballroom. It was one of many Harlem jazz clubs located on Lenox Avenue and competed intensely with the Savoy Ballroom.

The Golden Gate closed around 1950.

Notable performers at the Golden Gate included Les Hite, Harlan Leonard, Claude Hopkins, Milt Herth, Jimmie Lunceford, Count Basie, Hot Lips Page, Josh White, Art Tatum, Billie Holiday, Hazel Scott, and Coleman Hawkins. The opening night stars were the Cotton Club Parade, Stepin Fetchit, and Louis Armstrong. The Teddy Wilson orchestra was the house band.

The ballroom was the first site used by pastor Alvin A. Childs' ministry in Harlem.

The Golden Gate Ballroom also hosted community events such as political rallies and the "Miss Fine Brown Frame" beauty pageant and served as a roller skating rink.
