= Jean Starr =

American actress and jazz musician

Jean Starr was an American actress, dancer, and trumpeter who became a Chicago society figure after marrying Chicago numbers racket tycoon and Jones brothers, McKissack "Mack" McHenry Jones, and becoming Jean Starr Jones.

Starr was from Columbus, Ohio.

She appeared in the theatrical productions Raisin' Cain (1923) and Lucky Sambo (1925).

She married McKissack "Mack" McHenry Jones, part of the prosperous Chicago African American Jones family that was involved in the "policy" numbers game racket before Al Capone and white mafia figures completed a violent takeover. After her husband's death in a car accident, she developed their vacation home into the Double J Ranch (referred to as the Pink Mansion) in Constantine Township, Michigan. The resort was popular with African Americans and also had high profile visitors. The area is now part of Three Rivers State Wildlife Management Area. She remained close with the Jones family and was the subject of society page notices in African American magazines.

She is recorded on the album Jazz Women: A Feminist Retrospective on the song "Moonlight On Turham Bay" with L'Ana Hyams and other female performers. She was also recorded as part of the International Sweethearts of Rhythm, a group she joined in 1940, including on the song "Tuxedo Junction". She also performed with the Jimmie Lunceford Band and played with the Benny Carter Orchestra. In her later years, she was part of Eddie Durham's All-Star Girl Orchestra.

She led the Bronzeville socialite group the Royalites.

She was expected to marry Clarence H. Cobbs of the First Church of Deliverance.

Josephine Baker was her sister-in-law.

== Discography ==
- "Seven Riffs with the Right Woman", All Women Groups Women in Jazz : All Women Groups Volume 1
- "Radio Papa", 1929 Okeh Records
- "Don't Get it Twisted"
- "Find Out What They Like (And How They Like It)" (1929), duet with Johnny Lee, Okeh Records
- "Tuxedo Junction" with the International Sweethearts of Rhythm
