= Pearl Theatre (Philadelphia) =

Former theatre and music venue in Philadelphia, PA, US

The Pearl Theatre was a theatre in Philadelphia, located at 2047 Ridge Avenue, near the present-day location of the Philadelphia Housing Authority headquarters. Opened in 1927 with 1400 seats, it was a notable jazz and dance venue and had a glamorous reputation among the rich and famous.

In 1931, the Nicholas Brothers played here. Duke Ellington, John Coltrane, and many other prominent jazz ensembles of the period performed here. Bennie Moten and the Kansas City Stompers's featuring Count Basie on piano performed at the club in November 1931, and in December 1932 the audience raved all week about their "Moten Swing"; the doors of the theatre were let open to the public who came crammed into the theatre to hear the new sound, demanding seven encores on one night.

Pearl Bailey was discovered at the theatre, where she entered and won the theatre's amateur song and dance contest and was to be paid $35 a week to perform there for two weeks, however, the theatre closed during her engagement and she was never paid.

The Pearl Theatre closed in 1963 and was demolished after 1970.

== Modern cinema ==
Another Pearl Theatre at 1600 N. Broad Street in Philadelphia functioned as a modern cinema complex. It closed in August 2016, but reopened several years later as the AMC Broadstreet 7.
