= Buster Smith =

American jazz alto saxophonist (1904–1991)

- Also known as: Buster, Professor
- Born: Henry Franklin Smith; August 24, 1904; Alsdorf, Ellis County, Texas, U.S.
- Died: August 10, 1991 (aged 86) Dallas, Texas, U.S.
- Genres: Jazz; big band; swing
- Instruments: Alto saxophone; organ; guitar; clarinet; bass guitar
- Years active: 1923–1980
- Labels: Atlantic

Henry Franklin "Buster" Smith (August 24, 1904 – August 10, 1991), also known as Professor Smith, was an American jazz alto saxophonist and mentor to Charlie Parker. Smith was instrumental in instituting the Texas Sax Sound with Count Basie and Lester Young in the 1930s.

Smith played saxophone for a number of prominent band leaders including Duke Ellington and Earl Hines as well as vocalist Ella Fitzgerald. He recorded his only album as leader in 1959 and despite intending to record a follow-up, he was injured in an accident and nothing else was released.

== Biography ==
=== Early life ===
Smith was born and raised in Alsdorf, Texas, a small township near Telico in the outskirts of Dallas, where he attended school as a child. Smith earned the name "Buster" from his parents as a baby, as he was born as an overweight child. Buster was the third of five boys and had no sisters, though both of his older brothers died in childhood of measles.

Smith's early musical influences were his mother, and his father, who played guitar. At the age of four years, Buster was playing the organ with his brother, pianist Boston Smith; Buster played the keys and Boston stepped on the pedals. Soon thereafter, his grandfather gave away the family organ because he believed it would only direct Buster to a life of sin.

=== Early career ===
In 1919, Smith picked cotton for a week to earn himself the money to buy a $3.50 clarinet. Smith learned to play several instruments by the time he was eighteen years old. In 1922, Smith and his family moved to Dallas. He joined the Voodie White Trio, playing Alto saxophone and clarinet. In 1923, he began his professional music career playing alto saxophone with the medicine shows, though he had to play very loudly to draw in more customers. This experience led to Smith defining his own musical style, known for being loud. The time with the medicine shows also led to Oran "Hot Lips" Page inviting Smith to join his group, the Oklahoma City Blue Devils, in 1925. Over the next few years, Smith wrote much of the group's music, learning from banjo player Johnny Clark, writing lyrics with co-workers from the bank that he worked in.

=== Peak success ===
When Smith joined the Blue Devils, the line-up consisted of Walter Page, Oran Page, Lester Young, Count Basie, Jimmy Rushing, and Emir "Bucket" Coleman. They toured the Kansas City area and the Midwest, playing jazz for a year, bringing all of its members into prominence. Basie and Page both left the group; however Smith decided to stay on, though this was very short lived and soon after he left also. After leaving the group, he and Basie formed the Buster Smith-Count Basie Band of Rhythm, where the two innovated a louder style of Jazz. Buster's contribution to the unique sound was by using a tenor saxophone reed in his alto saxophone to achieve a louder, "fatter" sound. Lester Young also joined the band and, to complement Smith's louder sound, he also opted for a harder reed, using a baritone saxophone reed on his tenor saxophone. This sound was later labelled the Texas Sax Sound. Smith gained a great amount of influence in the Texan music community and industry. Smith mentored legendary saxophonist Charlie Parker during the 1930s, developing a "father-son relationship" through mentoring Parker.

In 1941, Smith decided to return to Dallas and to cease touring, though he remained active in the local music scene. In the following years, he wrote for jazz and blues bands, played often, and taught many young Texan musicians, including Aaron "T-Bone" Walker and Red Garland among others. He also performed session work with artists such as Pete Johnson's Boogie-Woogie Boys, Eddie Durham, Leo "Snub" Mosley, Bon and His Buddies, and the Don Redman Orchestra.

=== Solo career ===
In 1959, Buster led his first solo recording session in Fort Worth, as prompted by Atlantic Records. From these sessions, released by Atlantic with the title The Legendary Buster Smith, Smith's notable songs included "Kansas City Riffs," "Buster's Tune," "E Flat Boogie," and Kurt Weill's "September Song." For the sessions, Buster enlisted his brother Boston Smith to play piano, along with musicians spanning his career to date.

=== Later life ===
In the 1960s, Smith was involved in an auto accident, in which he was injured and no longer able to play the saxophone. In order to continue playing music, he started to play the bass guitar throughout Dallas and continued to participate in the Dallas musical community. Buster led a dance music band until 1980, and played in the Legendary Revelations in the mid-1980s. Smith died in Dallas on August 10, 1991, of a heart attack.

== Discography ==
- The Legendary Buster Smith, Atlantic Records, 1959 (Reissued by Koch Records, 1999)
