= 101 Ranch Boys =

The 101 Ranch Boys was an American country western band. Formed in Kansas City, Kansas in the 1930s the group was based in York, Pennsylvania where they broadcast their own local radio program on WSBA (AM). They later had their own radio program for ABC radio which was broadcast both nationally and internationally through affiliates. They recorded albums for Columbia Records and also gave concerts internationally; both as a band and accompanying famous country singers. Some of the artists they performed with were Gene Autry, Rex Allen, Ken Maynard, Jimmy Wakely, and Ken Curtis. They also played a show for President Harry S. Truman at Constitution Hall in Washington DC. The group's original members were George Long, Smoky Roberts, Andy Reynolds, and Cliff Brown.
