= Ed Lewis (musician) =

American jazz trumpeter (1909–1985)

Ed Lewis (January 22, 1909 – September 18, 1985) was an American jazz trumpeter.

== Career ==
Born in Eagle City, Oklahoma, Lewis played early in his career in Kansas City, Missouri, with Jerry Westbrook as a baritone hornist, then switched to trumpet in 1925. He played with Paul Banks and Laura Rucker before joining the Bennie Moten Orchestra, where he played from 1926 to 1932 and was the primary trumpet soloist until Hot Lips Page became a member. In the 1930s he worked with Thamon Hayes (1932–34), Harlan Leonard (1934–37), and Jay McShann (1937). In 1937 Lewis joined the Count Basie Orchestra, where he remained until 1948; he recorded frequently with Basie but almost never soloed.

In the 1950s Lewis led his band in New York City for local performances and worked for a while as a taxi driver. He returned to play with the Countsmen in Europe in 1984 shortly before his death. Lewis never led a recording session.

== Discography ==
- Count Basie, The Original American Decca Recordings (GRP, 1992)
- Ruth Brown, Ruth Brown (Atlantic, 1957)
- Ruth Brown, Miss Rhythm (Atlantic, 1959)
- Jimmy Rushing, The Jazz Odyssey of Jimmy Rushing (Philips, 1957)

== General references ==
- Scott Yanow, Ed Lewis at Allmusic
