= Moten Swing =

Single by Bennie Moten and his Kansas City Orchestra
- Released: 1932
- Recorded: December 13, 1932, Camden, New Jersey
- Label: Victor
- Songwriters: Copyrighted to Buster and Bennie Moten, authorship disputed by Count Basie who claims authorship with Eddie Durham

"Moten Swing" (originally "Moten's Swing") is a 1932 jazz standard by Bennie Moten and his Kansas City Orchestra. It was an important jazz standard in the move towards a freer form of orchestral jazz and the development of Swing music. Moten and his Orchestra, which included Count Basie on piano, achieved much success with it, although the song is most associated with Basie's Count Basie Orchestra, who recorded it in 1940.

== Original ==
The song, already an anthem of Kansas City, had its origins in an earlier composition, when Buster Moten and trombonist Thamon Hayes composed "Moten Stomp" in 1927, and it was in the charts for two weeks the following year. Count Basie has stated that he and guitarist Eddie Durham deserved the most credit for it and that it was essentially his, although he didn't join the band until 1929. The 1932 "Moten Swing", written by Bennie and Buster Moten, recorded at Camden, New Jersey, on December 13, 1932, gained much acclaim in the jazz community and is seen as an important jazz standard in the move towards a freer form of orchestral jazz. The audience at the Pearl Theatre in Philadelphia raved about the song, and the doors were let open to the public who came crammed into the theatre to hear the new sound, demanding seven encores.

The original recording is a four even beats to the bar, written in AABA form, thirty-two measures long. Basie and jazz historian Mark C. Gridley claimed that "Moten Swing" is based on the chord progression to the song "You’re Driving Me Crazy" in the key of E♭ major. According to Dave Sager of Jazz.com, "The bridge of the first chorus, cleverly truncated, features spine-tingling, shouting brass played into metal derbies and sounding like they are in the room with the listener." The song begins with Count Basie soloing over the form in his famous "minimalistic" style of playing very little notes but giving them a lot of meaning. The band has a gigantic interjectory hit in the second chorus leading into the swinging Basie "laid back" feel with the melody. He adds that a "sudden key change - the tune modulates from the key of E♭ major to the key of A♭ major, in which the shout is played, via an E-flat augmented chord - introduces Hot Lips Page who solos in a coolish un-Armstrong manner." This leads into the shout which is somewhat standard for a swinging Count Basie chart filled with loud brass hits, shakes, and calls.

== 1938 development ==
"Moten Swing" became more popular in 1938 when it was recorded by the Benny Goodman orchestra during a Kansas City radio session and was recorded by Fletcher Henderson the same year as "Moten Stomp". In 1940, Count Basie and his Orchestra, with Eddie Durham on guitar, further increased its popularity when he played "Moten Swing" in A-flat major at the Southland Ballroom in Boston, with "fine solos by the Count and nice muted trumpet by Harry Edison" according to Chris Tyle. Basie "introduces the first chorus with a confident, eight-bar stride piano solo, segueing into a forceful contrasting riff exchange between the brass and reed sections". "Moten Swing" has since become most associated with Count Basie.

== Other recordings ==
It has been recorded by the likes of pianist Oscar Peterson, vibraphonist Cal Tjader, trumpeters/bandleaders Harry James and Shorty Rogers, saxophonist Ernie Watts, the Barrett Deems Big Band, guitarist Kenny Burrell, violinist Claude Williams, and many others.
