= Mary H. Bradford =

American blues singer

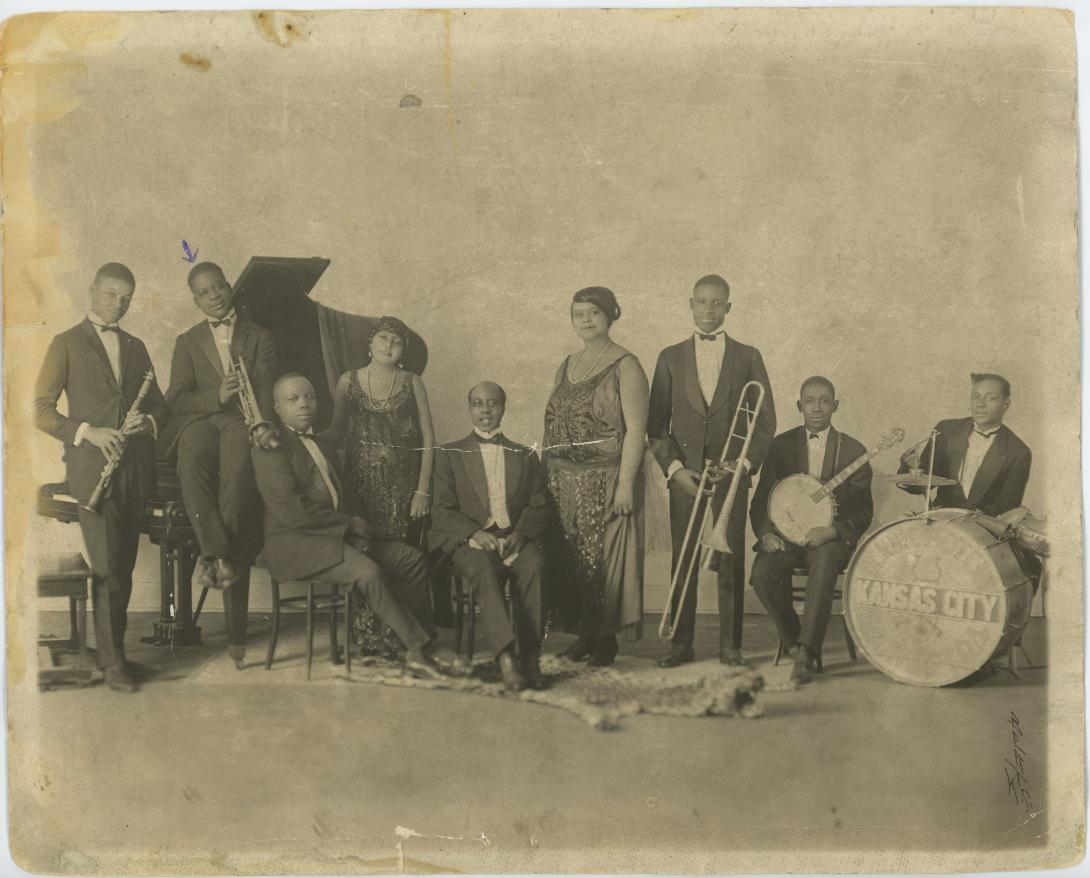
- Mary Bradford (fourth from left) and Bennie Moten's Orchestra

Background information
- Also known as: Auntie Mary Bradford, Mary Bradford
- Genre: Blues
- Occupation: Singer
- Years active: 1923–1928

Mary H. Bradford (or Auntie Mary Bradford) was an American blues singer, songwriter, composer, and lyricist. She performed and recorded with Bennie Moten, Ada Brown, and Bennie Moten's Kansas City Orchestra. She emerged alongside the early rise of blues music, with The Call noting in November 1923 that she was one of Kansas City's prominent race artists, credited with creating "first big blues". Bradford was a contra-alto vocalist with a very brief career in music. Her album feature debut was with Bennie Moten's Kansas City Orchestra in 1923. Her second and final album was recorded under the name Auntie Mary Bradford in 1928 and was a solo album.

== Career ==
=== Singer ===
- "Waco Texas Blues" – Mary Bradford acc. Bennie Moten's Kansas City Orchestra – September 1923
- "Chattanooga Blues" – Mary Bradford acc. Bennie Moten's Kansas City Orchestra – September 1923
- "Selma Bamma Blues" – Mary Bradford acc. Bennie Moten's Kansas City Orchestra – September 1923

=== Lyricist/composer ===
- "Sobbin' Hearted Blues" – Sara Martin and Clarence Williams – September 1924
- "Sobbin' Hearted Blues" – Bessie Smith – January 1925
