= Dicionário Cravo Albin da Música Popular Brasileira =

Website about Brazilian musicians

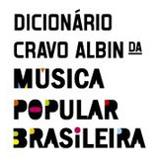
- Website type: Dictionary
- Available in: Portuguese
- Owner: Instituto Cultural Cravo Albin
- Creator: Tribeira e Estopim
- Website: dicionariompb.com.br
- Commercial: No
- Launched: 2006; 20 years ago
- Current status: Active

The Dicionário Cravo Albin da Música Popular Brasileira (Cravo Albin Dictionary of Brazilian Pop Music) is a non-commercial website maintained by the Instituto Cultural Cravo Albin (Cravo Albin Cultural Institute). Its objective is to gather information about artists, musicians and musical groups of música popular brasileira (MPB).

A 2006 physical version of the dictionary by Editora Paracatu, named the Dicionário Houaiss Ilustrado – Música Popular Brasileira, contained information about 5,322 authors, interpreters, groups, associations, blocs and styles of Brazilian music, and the discography of 1,953 musicians and musical groups.
