= Eddie Durham =

American jazz guitarist, trombonist and composer (1906–1987)

- Born: Edward Durham; August 19, 1906; San Marcos, Texas, U.S.
- Died: March 6, 1987 (aged 80) New York City, U.S.
- Genre: Jazz
- Occupations: Musician, composer, arranger
- Instruments: Guitar, trombone
- Years active: 1920s–1980s
- Label: RCA

Edward Durham (August 19, 1906 – March 6, 1987) was an American jazz guitarist, trombonist, composer, and arranger. He was one of the pioneers of the electric guitar in jazz. The orchestras of Bennie Moten, Jimmie Lunceford, Count Basie, and Glenn Miller took great benefit from his composing and arranging skill.

With Edgar Battle he composed "Topsy", which was recorded by Count Basie and became a hit for Benny Goodman.

In 1938, Durham wrote "I Don't Want to Set the World on Fire" with Bennie Benjamin, Sol Marcus, and Eddie Seiler. During the 1940s, Durham created Eddie Durham's All-Star Girl Orchestra, an African-American all female swing band that toured the United States and Canada.

== Early Life ==
Durham was born in San Marcos, Texas, on August 19, 1906, to Joseph Durham Sr. and Luella Rabb (née Mohawk) Durham. He drew inspiration to become a musician from his father who played the fiddle at square dances and his older brother Joe who performed as a cellist for Nat King Cole. At the age of 10, Durham began his professional career and performed with his three brothers Joe, Earl, and Roosevelt in the Durham Brothers Band. On occasion, they were joined by their sister Myrtle on piano and family friend Edgar Battle on trumpet. The brothers were later joined by their cousins Clyde Durham, Allen Durham who had performed as a trombonist in Andy Kirk’s “Clouds of Joy”, and most notably renowned tenor saxophonist Herschel Evans when they toured in Dallas.

After leaving the group at the age of 18, Durham decided to leave the band to pursue touring opportunities. Durham worked with Doug Morton’s Dramatic Show and then with the Miller Brother’s 101 Ranch Show from Oklahoma, a traveling Wild West circus consisting of hundreds of performers. Durham worked in the African American band – a lineup of 15 male instrumentalists – to perform a nine-piece minstrel show. After hours, both white and black performers played together, working on pieces composed by Durham.

The troupe allowed him to travel across the nation. While touring in Chicago, Durham learned Louis Armstrong was performing but could not afford the admission fee. He distinctly remembered standing on a box outside the club window being awe-struck by the music which poured from Armstrong’s cornet, heavily influencing his career.

Durham also worked with African American territory bands throughout the mid- and Southwestern United States including Gene Coy's “Black Aces”, Chauncey Downs’s “Rinkey Dinks”, George E Lee and Jesse Stone, and Andy Kirk’s “Clouds of Joy.”

== Career ==
Durham’s most groundbreaking work and recognition came while working with Walter Page’s Blue Devils. While performing in Kansas City, band leader Benny Moten recognized Durham’s potential along with that of some of the other performers – including Walter Page himself – and hired them along with his current band members to create a stronger, more musically-inclined lineup of performers. Durham’s compositions became a centerpiece for Moten’s band, elevating the band’s status in the jazz industry and increasing its popularity. Between 1929 and 1933, Durham worked with William Basie – with which Durham has been credited for giving him his famous nickname “Count” – to adapt Moten’s compositions to swing, switching tuba for string bass and banjo for guitar to better fit the style. Count Basie would take over the band after Moten’s death due to an unsuccessful tonsilectomy.

Shortly before Moten’s death in 1935, Durham left to seek a career as an arranger in New York, working briefly for performers such as Cab Calloway and Willy Bryant and collaborating with Count Basie on compositions, bringing his Kansas City swing influences to the East Coast. He joined Jimmy Lunceford’s band – sometimes referred to as the Harlem Express due to Lunceford’s strict, demanding nature, constant work hours, and low pay – increasing the band’s composition outputs, using his expertise on trombone to implement innovative slide work into the pieces he arranged.

Durham recalls working with trombonists Russell Bowles and Elmer Crumbly:

“I taught a lot of tricks to the other trombones in the [Lunceford] band, Russell [Bowles] and Elmer [Crumbley]. …Russell and I would jump out of our chairs and get in a sword fight with our trombones… We were a regular clown outfit, but then the band could go back and blow you away.”(From The Ghosts of Harlem-Sessions with Jazz Legends by Hank O’Neal, 2009, p. 14)

Durham commented and how he worked with the acoustics of electric guitars during his time with Lunceford:

“For amplification, I used an acoustic but rigged up my own homemade guitar… Finally, I got an old amplifier with a mic… I made a resonator with a tin pan back in the early 1930s. I’d carve out the inside of an acoustic guitar and put the resonator inside there, the size of a breakfast plate, with something around the guitar to hold it. When I hit the strings, the pie pan would ring and shoot out the sound. Before long, I ran up on a National, with a resonator in it… I removed the bridge and put an acoustic type bridge on it because the other bridge held the strings up too high. When I was with Lunceford there was one microphone for the singer, but when I played my solo, Lunceford would bring that microphone up to my guitar’s F-Hole. He was crazy about the resonator.”

From 1929, Durham started experimenting to enhance the sound of his guitar using resonators and megaphones. In 1935, he was the first to record an electrically amplified guitar with Jimmie Lunceford in "Hittin' the Bottle" that was recorded in New York for Decca.

When Count Basie formed his band, Basie offered Durham a one year contract for double his current salary. From the summer of 1937 to the summer of 1938, Durham helped to create notable jazz swing compositions “Swinging at the Blues”, “Jumping at the Woodside” and “Topsy”. In 1938, with members from a select group of Basie’s band – Freddie Green, Walter Page, Joe Jones, Lester Young, and Buck Clayton – Durham recorded under independent label Commodore as the Kansas City Six, making a major breakthrough on the electric guitar in jazz.

Texan counterpart Charlie Christian was heavily influenced by Durham’s electric guitar work, and during his one month residency with Count Basie’s Band met with Durham multiple times one on one to learn his techniques.

After leaving Basie in 1938, Durham was one of the most sought out arrangers in the industry. He worked with such notable musicians as Teddy Wilson and Billie Holiday and provided several arrangements for Artie Shaw and Glenn Miller – particularly providing the idea for the Glenn Miller’s Band’s famous derby-hat routine during performances and arranging one of big band jazz’s most famous hits: Glenn Miller’s “In the Mood.” He also co-wrote with Sol Marcus, Benny Benjamin, and Eddie Seiler what became considered to be an American jazz standard which made the Ink Spots hit Top 10 on the charts: “I Don’t Want to Set the World On Fire.”

During World War II, Durham led the International Sweethearts of Rhythm and then formed his own all female band “Eddie Durham’s All-Star Girl Orchestra” which performed across the United States and Canada. The group worked to raise war bonds and performed at United Service Organization (USO) centers and military camps.

Eddie Durham would continue to perform and arrange pieces until his death on March 6, 1987 at the age of 80 in New York City, New York.

== Awards and Honors ==
Eddie Durham was inducted into the National Academy of Recording Arts and Sciences (N.A.R.A.S.) Hall of Fame in 1983 for his contributions with Glen Miller, particularly for working on “In the Mood”, regarded as the greatest jazz hit of all time. He also was a Harlem Week Honoree with Ella Fitzgerald in 1986. His highest regarded distinction, however, was his posthumous induction into the American Jazz Hall of Fame, cementing his place in jazz history.

Each year, since 2002, San Marcos, Texas (Durham’s place of birth) has held the annual Eddie Durham Festival, and that same year, the Calaboose African American History Museum added a permanent Eddie Durham exhibit. On August 13, 2013, the Eddie Durham Park & Pavilion opened in San Marcos years later, and the following year he was honored by the state of Texas with the Civil Rights Trailblazers Medallion for his contributions for breaking color barriers in entertainment and innovations in jazz.

== Discography ==
=== As leader ===
- Eddie Durham (RCA, 1974)
- Blue Bone (JSP, 1981)

=== As sideman ===
- Bennie Moten, Band Box Shuffle (Hep, 1929–32)
- Jimmie Lunceford, The Complete Jimmie Lunceford Vol. 3, 4, 5 (Decca, 1935–39)
- Count Basie, The Complete Decca Recordings (3CD) (Decca, 1937–41)
- Lester Young, Lester Young with the Kansas City Five (Commodore, 1938)
- Glenn Miller, The Complete Glenn Miller (RCA Bluebird, 1938–42)

== Selected compositions and arrangements ==
- Bennie Moten:
  - "Moten Swing" (1932) (composer, arranger)
- Jimmie Lunceford:
  - "Rhapsody Junior" (1935) with Edwin Wilcox
  - "Oh! Boy" (1935)
  - "Avalon" (1935)
  - "Hittin' the Bottle" (1935)
  - "Harlem Shout" (1936)
  - "Running a Temperature" (1936)
  - "Honey Keep Your Mind On Me" (1936)
  - "Count Me Out" (1936)
  - "Pigeon Walk" (1937)
  - "Wham (Re-Bop-Boom-Bam)" (1939)
  - "Lunceford Special" (1939)
  - "Blues in the Groove" (1939)
  - "It's Time To Jump and Shout" (1939)
- Count Basie:
  - "Time Out" (Decca, 1937)
  - "Topsy" (Decca, 1937)
  - "Swinging the Blues" (Decca, 1938)
  - "Jumpin' at the Woodside" (Decca, 1938)
- Glenn Miller
  - "In The Mood" (RCA Bluebird, 1939) note: not composed by Durham, but the arrangement is his.
  - "Slip Horn Jive" (RCA Bluebird, 1939)
  - "Wham (Re-Bop-Boom-Bam)" (RCA Bluebird, 1939)

== See also ==
- International Sweethearts of Rhythm
- Eddie Durham's All-Star Girl Orchestra
- List of jazz arrangers
- www.DurhamJazz.com
