= Harlan Leonard =

American jazz player and bandleader (1905–1983)

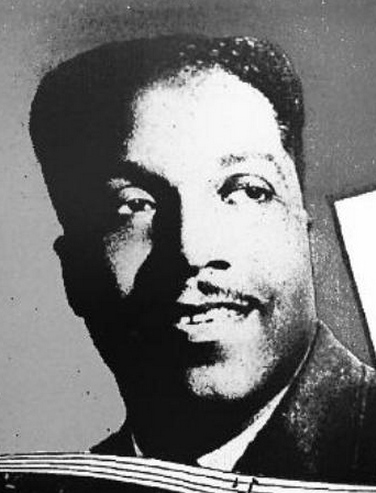
- Harlan Leonard

Background information
- Birth name: Harlan Quentin Leonard
- Born: July 2, 1905; Kansas City, Missouri, U.S.
- Died: November 10, 1983 (aged 78); Los Angeles, California, U.S.
- Genres: Jazz
- Occupation(s): Musician, bandleader
- Instrument: Clarinet

Harlan Leonard (July 2, 1905 – November 10, 1983) was an American jazz bandleader and clarinetist from Kansas City, Missouri, United States.

Leonard was born in Kansas City in 1905. A professional musician from the age of 17, he joined Bennie Moten's orchestra in 1923, where he led the reed section until 1931. In 1931, he and Thamon Hayes formed the Kansas City Skyrockets, which included trumpeters Ed Lewis and James Ross, trombonist Vic Dickenson, and pianist Jesse Stone. After disputes with the Chicago local of the American Federation of Musicians the band broke up.

In 1939, Leonard formed Harlan Leonard and his Rockets, which featured a young Myra Taylor. This band quickly became a leading band in Kansas City and toured nationally. Charlie Parker played in this band for five weeks, but he was fired by Leonard for lack of discipline. The band featured arrangements by its piano player Tadd Dameron that bore suggestions of the transition between swing and bebop. The band broke up during the Second World War, and Leonard left professional music. He worked in banking and for the Internal Revenue Service and died in Los Angeles in 1983.

== Discography ==
- 1940 - The Chronological (Classics, 1992) (contains all the 1940 RCA sides, no alternate takes)
- 1940 - H L and His Rockets (RCA Victor, 1965) Lp 16 tracks
- 1940 - Rockin' With The Rockets (RCA Black And Blue, ?) LP16 tracks
