= Electric Bass =

Electric bass can mean:

- Electric upright bass, the electric version of a double bass
- Electric bass guitar
- Bass synthesizer
- Big Mouth Billy Bass, a battery-powered singing fish
