= Eugene Coy =

American jazz drummer, pianist, and bandleader (1898–1962)

- Born: Eugene Butler Coy; July 3, 1898; Cleburne, Texas, U.S.
- Died: August 8, 1962 (aged 64) Fresno, California, U.S.
- Genre: Jazz
- Occupations: Musician; bandleader
- Instruments: Drums; piano
- Years active: 1927–1950s
- Formerly of: Happy Black Aces; Gene Coy and His Harlem Swing; Gene Coy and His Killer Dillers

Eugene Butler "Gene" Coy (July 3, 1898, in Cleburne, Texas – August 8, 1962) was an American jazz drummer and pianist who led a territory band from the 1920s to 1950s.

== Career ==
Coy began his career in 1927, leading the Happy Black Aces, a territory dance band in Amarillo, with his wife, Ann Coy, as the pianist. From roughly 1929 to 1933, the band included trumpeter Carl "Tatti" Smith (1931–4), saxophonists Ben Webster and Dick Wilson, and bassist Junior Raglin, who was with them from 1938 until 1941, when he left to replace Jimmy Blanton in Duke Ellington's orchestra. The band traveled extensively throughout the southwest (though were confined to lesser venues as a black group) and as far as Mexico and Canada. In the early 1940s, the band relocated to San Francisco and toured the West Coast, now billed as "Gene Coy and his Harlem Swing".

Other members of Coy's band, at various times, have included, Oscar Cobb; Allen, Eddie, and Clyde Durham; Andre Duryea; "Bat" Johnson; Tyree Johnson; Charlie Lewis; Ted Manning; Alton Moore; Henry Powell; Otto Sampson; Lester Taylor; Red Thompson; Eddie Walker; and Isaiah Young; as well as trombonist Dan Minor (1931) and saxophonist Maxwell Davis (1939–41).

Although they remained popular into the 1950s, Coy and his band did not record until around 1948–49.

Coy died of a heart attack in front of his house on August 8, 1962, in Fresno, California. He was buried at the nearby Belmont Memorial Park.
