= Alton Moore =

American jazz trombonist (1908–1978)

Alton "Slim" Moore (October 7, 1908 – 1978) was an American jazz trombonist.

He was born in Selma, Alabama, United States. Moore began on the baritone horn before settling on trombone by age 17. A must instrumentalist who selected a trombone and trumpet doubling on a 1929-1950 Louis Armstrong recording, a trombone and tuba doubling on 1942-1953 Capitol Records jazz album and a piano and trombone doubling on a 1945-1949 Dizzy Gillespie recording. He played with local bandleaders and territory bands in his youth, such as those of Georgia Barlowe, Eddie Lemon, Gonzelle White, and Gene Coy. He moved to New York City early in the 1930s, playing with Jack Butler, Charlie Skeete, and Bobby Neal. He switched ensembles frequently in New York, and in 1938 did a short tour of Cuba with Leon Gross's orchestra. Toward the end of the decade Moore moved up to play in more high-profile bands such as those of Fats Waller, Coleman Hawkins, Hot Lips Page, and Charlie Johnson. He played with Ella Fitzgerald and Benny Carter in the early 1940s, and with Dizzy Gillespie and Louis Armstrong, later in the decade.

By the 1950s Moore had reduced to part-time playing, after an extended stay in the band of Stafford "Pazuza" Simon. He played with Fletcher Henderson in 1957, and in the 1960s played in the Prince Hall Symphonic Band in New York as well as other big band revival outfits.

In addition to trombone, Moore also occasionally recorded on euphonium, and did some scat singing on his records with Fats Waller.

He died in New York City in 1978.
