= Russell Bowles =

American jazz musician

Russell Bowles (April 17, 1907 – July 5, 1991) was an American jazz trombonist. He was born in Glasgow, Kentucky and died in Lancaster, Pennsylvania.

Bowles played with Ferman Tapp's Melody Lads in 1926–28, then with Horace Henderson (1928–29) before joining the orchestra of a theater in Buffalo, New York from 1929 to 1931. Following this Bowles joined the orchestra of Jimmie Lunceford, playing on nearly all of Lunceford's recordings from 1931 to Lunceford's death in 1947. After his tenure with Lunceford Bowles worked with Eddie Wilcox and Cab Calloway into the early 1950s, then left music permanently, later working as a clerk in a department store in New York City.
