= Blanche Calloway =

American jazz singer, composer and bandleader (1902–1978)

Background information
- Born: Blanche Dorothea Jones Calloway; February 9, 1902; Rochester, New York, U.S.
- Died: December 16, 1978 (aged 76) Baltimore, Maryland
- Genre: Jazz
- Occupations: Singer, bandleader

Blanche Dorothea Jones Calloway (February 9, 1902 – December 16, 1978) was an American jazz singer, composer, and bandleader. She was the older sister of Cab Calloway and was a successful singer before her brother. With a music career that spanned over 50 years, Calloway was the first woman to lead an all-male orchestra and performed alongside musicians such as Cozy Cole, Chick Webb, and her brother. Her performing style was described as flamboyant and a major influence on her brother's performance style.

== Early life ==
Calloway was born in Rochester, New York. When she was a teenager, the family, including her four siblings – Bernice, Henry, Cabell III (later Cab Calloway), and Elmer who was born in 1912 before the move to Baltimore – moved to Baltimore, Maryland around 1912 or 1913. The family had originally lived in Baltimore prior to Rochester but had left due to tough times with the crash of the real estate market where Cabell II worked. Her father, Cabell, was a lawyer and her mother, Martha Eulalia Reed, was a music teacher. In Baltimore, the family lived with the grandparents, Cabell I and Elizabeth Calloway, at 1017 Druid Hill Avenue. The neighborhood was populated only by African-Americans at the time. The family was described as being middle-class, even upper-class for the particular section of the city they lived in. The date of Cabell II's death is debatable, some sources argue that he passed after the family had moved to Baltimore on October 15, 1913. Another source claims that he died in 1910, and her mother married insurance salesman John Nelson Fortune a few years later. The couple would have two more children: John in 1916 and Mary Camilla in 1918. The family later moved to 2216 Druid Hill Avenue.

Calloway's mother was a major influence on her and her siblings' passion for music. Aside from her and Cab, their brother Elmer would also go on to briefly pursue a musical career. Calloway's mother made her take piano and voice lessons as a child, but never promoted the idea of a musical career for the young Calloway. Martha hoped that her daughter would pursue a "respectable" career, such as a teacher or nurse. Calloway dreamed of a musical career and was influenced as a youth by Florence Mills and Ida Cox. Her music teacher would encourage her to audition for a local talent scout and to her mother's annoyance, Calloway dropped out of Morgan College in the early 1920s to seek out a career in music.

== Family ==
Blanche Calloway's first common-law husband was Henry Waddy; he played multiple roles throughout their relationship, not only as a romantic partner but also functioning as Calloway's manager and agent. They lived and worked together throughout the 1920s and Waddy became close with Cab Calloway as well, who often referred to him as 'Watty.'

== Early professional career ==
Even in her youth, Blanche Calloway was a singer, starting in choir concerts given by the local Grace Presbyterian Church in Baltimore. By 1921, Calloway left home to tour with cabaret troupes, specifically the Smarter Set Co., originally established in 1909 and led by brothers Salem Tutt Whitney and J. Homer Tutt. Calloway appeared in one of the brothers' skits Up and Down as one of the featured 'Bronze Beauties' on December 5, 1921. From there, her roles expanded from chorus girl to bit parts, and eventually to featured singer.

Calloway made her professional debut in Baltimore in 1921 with Eubie Blake and Noble Sissle's musical Shuffle Along. Her big break came in 1923 on the national tour for Plantation Days, which featured her idol, Florence Mills. The show ended in 1927 in Chicago, and Calloway decided to stay there, as it was the jazz capital of the world during the time. The club, the Sunset, became her main stage and where Cab Calloway likewise worked after his move to Chicago. Surprising for the time, Blanche Calloway earned higher wages than Cab, making around two to three hundred dollars whereas Cab regularly made $35 a week. She became popular in the Chicago scene and would continue to tour nationally, performing at New York's Ciro Club in the mid-1920s. Shortly after her time at the Ciro Club, she moved to Chicago, Illinois. In 1925, she recorded two blues songs, which would be promoted as race records, accompanied by Louis Armstrong and Richard M. Jones; the first inception of her Joy Boys orchestra. During this decade, she would also perform with Reuben Reeves and record on Vocalion Records.

At one point, she performed with her brother's band before going on to work with Andy Kirk's orchestra, the Clouds of Joy, at the Pearl Theater in Philadelphia in 1931 and recorded three songs, including a song she wrote which has been called her "trademark" song: "I Need Lovin". While working with Kirk, Calloway failed to take over his orchestra, to serve as bandleader. Despite her attempts to take over his band, she learned extensively about music management.

Blanche Calloway sings with plenty of spirit and sass, showing that she was in the same league with her better-known brother.
Scott Yanow, 2001

In 1931 annual emancipation celebration dances were held. These celebrations about the ending of slavery held a similar reverence as Memorial Day and activities ranged from formal gatherings to more leisure activities, the latter becoming more popular over time with picnics and dances lasting for days. Blanche Calloway attended in Wheeling, West Virginia, appearing in "The September Show" as the main attraction.

She would go on to form another big band, Blanche Calloway and Her Joy Boys, which included Ben Webster on tenor saxophone and Cozy Cole on drums. This made her the first woman to lead an all-male jazz orchestra. This big band recorded four times in 1931 and once in 1934 and 1935, releasing recordings on RCA Victor. The band would eventually change their name to Blanche Calloway and Her Orchestra and in 1933 the Pittsburgh Courier called Calloway and her orchestra one of the top ten outstanding African American orchestras. During 1934 and 1935 she would record eight songs with this group, including songs such as "Just a Crazy Song", "Make Me Know It", "You Ain't Livin' Right", and a remake of "I Need Lovin'". Calloway and Her Joy Boys performed heavily in New York City, including at the Lafayette Theatre, the Harlem Opera House, and the Apollo Theatre. A version of the Joy Boys would tour, featuring Cozy Cole still on drums, Bennie Moten, Andy Kirk, Chick Webb, and Zack Wythe. She wrote a number of songs for the group, including "Rhythm of the River" and "Growling Dan".

== Career struggles ==
She struggled in the racially segregated and male-dominated music industry of the period. As an African American performer she had to frequently play to segregated audiences. While on tour in 1936, she used the women's bathroom at a gas station in Yazoo, Mississippi. In response, the police were called, an orchestra member was pistol whipped, and both he and Calloway were jailed for disorderly conduct and fined $7.50. While the two were in jail, another member stole the group's money and abandoned the band in Mississippi. The musicians went their own separate ways and Calloway sold her yellow Cadillac for cash to leave the state.

As a musician, Calloway had a reputation for being "exceptional", but was given few opportunities outside of being a singer or dancer due to gender roles of the time. Her flamboyant and sometimes provocative lyrics challenged the stereotype of what a female performer was supposed to be. By the mid-1930s Calloway struggled to find bookings as her brother's career grew in popularity.

== Influence on Cab Calloway ==
Calloway was a major influence on her brother's career and performance style. Her own performance style was lively, dramatic, and animated. She would teach her brother about performing, and the two would sometimes perform together as a brother and sister act. Calloway helped her brother get his first role on stage, in Plantation Days, when another cast member fell ill. She may have served as the influence for Cab's signature "Hi De Ho" chant in his song "Minnie the Moocher". He says he came up with the phrase when he forgot the words during a performance, but his sister had performed and recorded a song earlier in 1931 called "Just a Crazy Song". In the song, Calloway opened it with her wailing "Hi Hi Hi, Ho De Ho De Ho", with the backing band performing call and response. Another song of Calloway's, "Growlin' Dan", tells the story of Minnie the Moocher and the King of Sweden, and also uses the phrase "Ho De Ho De Ho." The two performers most likely collaborated and often borrowed from one another.

== Later career and life ==
After years of struggling for major success, in 1938 she declared bankruptcy and broke up her orchestra. In 1940 she formed a short-lived all-women orchestra, feeding on the popularity of all-female bands during World War II. The band struggled to get bookings and soon disbanded after forming. Calloway continued to sing on occasion and moved to a suburb of Philadelphia with her husband in the mid-1940s. She became a socialite and served as a Democratic committeewoman. She eventually separated from her husband after discovering he was a bigamist.

In the early 1950s Calloway moved to Washington, D.C., where she managed the nightclub Crystal Caverns. She hired Ruth Brown to perform at the club and would become Brown's manager. Brown credited Calloway with discovering her and helping her get a contract with Atlantic Records. In the late 1950s Calloway moved to Florida and became a disc jockey for WMBM in Miami Beach. Eventually, she became program director of the station, and served in that role for 20 years before moving back to Baltimore. While still in Florida, she became the first African American precinct voting clerk and the first African American woman to vote in Florida in 1958. She became an active member of the NAACP and the Congress of Racial Equality, also serving on the board of the National Urban League. In 1964, she and about forty other African American women protested with the NATO Women's Peace Force at The Hague.

Calloway converted to Christian Science and credited the religion with helping her fight her 12-year battle with cancer. Around 1968, she formed Afram House, a mail-order cosmetics company for African Americans. She moved back to Baltimore and married her high school sweetheart. She died from breast cancer on December 16, 1978, at the age of 76.
