= Thamon Hayes =

American jazz trombonist and composer (1899–1978)

Thamon Hayes (October 11, 1899 – August 1, 1978) was a Dixieland jazz trombonist and composer of the early Kansas City jazz scene, who along with Bennie Moten composed several of the hits of the Bennie Moten's Kansas City Orchestra such as "South" and the original 1927 version of "Moten Swing". He left the band in 1931 to form the Kansas City Rockets, which in 1936 became "Leonard's Rockets". Hayes´ new band were billed by the Kansas City Call as "the new wonder band of accomplished musicians", and their first performance was met with unprecedented attention in Kansas City driving the crowds wild.
