= George E. Lee =

George Ewing Lee (April 28, 1896–October 2, 1958) was an American jazz bandleader.

Born in Boonville, Missouri, Lee was the older brother of pianist/singer Julia Lee. He played in a band while serving in the Army in 1917; following this, he sang in a vocal quartet, and in 1920, he formed an ensemble of his own. With his sister as one of the group's members, he was a regular player at Lyric Hall in Kansas City through much of the 1920s. In 1927, they recorded as an octet, with Jesse Stone on piano, for Meritt Records; among the tunes was "Down Home Syncopated Blues," the earliest recording of Julia Lee's voice. They recorded six tunes for Brunswick in 1929.

In 1933, Lee's group was absorbed into the Bennie Moten Orchestra. In 1935, he struck out on his own again; he moved to Jackson, Michigan, in 1940, retired from music in 1941, and began managing a nightclub in Detroit in 1942. Later in the 1940s, he moved to San Diego, where he died on October 2, 1958.

== See also ==
- Kansas City Jazz
