= Bennie Moten =

American jazz pianist and band leader (1893–1935)

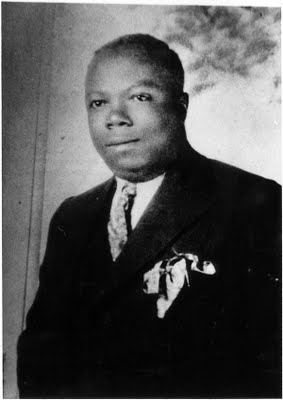

Background information
- Born: Benjamin Moten; November 13, 1893; Kansas City, Missouri, U.S.
- Died: April 2, 1935 (aged 41) Kansas City, Missouri, U.S.
- Genres: Jazz, Kansas City jazz
- Occupations: Musician, bandleader
- Instrument: Piano
- Labels: Victor, OKeh, Bluebird, His Master's Voice, RCA

Benjamin Moten (November 13, 1893 – April 2, 1935) was an American jazz pianist and band leader born and raised in Kansas City, Missouri, United States.

He led his Kansas City Orchestra, the most important of the regional, blues-based orchestras active in the Midwest in the 1920s, and helped to develop the riffing style that would come to define many of the 1930s big bands. The jazz standard "Moten Swing" bears his name.

== Career ==
Moten started making music from an early age and developed as a pianist, pulling together other musicians in a band. His first recordings were made (for OKeh Records) on September 23, 1923, and were rather typical interpretations of the New Orleans style of King Oliver and others. They also showed the influence of the ragtime that was still popular in the area, as well as the stomping beat for which his band was famous. These OKeh sides (recorded 1923–1925) are some of the more valuable acoustic jazz 78s of the era; they are treasured records in many serious jazz collections.

They signed with Victor Records in 1926, and were influenced by the more sophisticated style of Fletcher Henderson. More often than not, their pieces featured a hard stomp beat that was extremely popular in Kansas City.

By 1927, Moten's orchestra contained many names associated with Kansas City music, and included Harlan Leonard (alto sax), Jack Washington (alto and baritone sax), Ed Lewis and Lamar Wright (trumpets) and Willie McWashington (drums). His orchestra featured the standard Kansas City style at the time: smooth sax chorus over tinkling piano and a bass drum beat.

Moten's popular 1928 recording of "South" on Victor V-38021 (itself a remake of the first version on OKeh from late 1924) stayed in Victor's catalog over the years. (It was reissued as 24893 in 1935, as Victor phased out any remaining V-38000 series that were still in the catalog.) In the late 1940s, it became a big jukebox hit (by then, reissued as 44-0004). It remained in print (as a vinyl 45) until RCA stopping making vinyl records.

By 1928, Moten's piano was showing some boogie woogie influences, but the real revolution came in 1929, after he recruited Count Basie, Walter Page, and Oran 'Hot Lips' Page. Walter Page's walking bass lines gave the music an entirely new feel compared to the 2/4 tuba of his predecessor Vernon Page, colored by Basie's understated, syncopated piano fills. Another boon to the band was adding Jimmy Rushing as their primary vocalist.

Moten's continued to be one of Victor's most popular orchestras through 1930. Their song "Kansas City Shuffle" was recorded during this time. (The band recorded prolifically, and many of their records were issued in Victor's regular series, not specifically marketed to the Black community as some other bands were.)

Their final session showed the early stages of what became known as the "Basie sound," four years before Basie recorded under his own name. (They made 10 recordings at Victor's Camden, New Jersey, studios on December 13, 1932, during a time when the band was suffering significant financial hardship.) By this time Ben Webster and Rushing had joined Moten's band, but Moten himself did not play on these sessions. These sides were mostly arranged by Eddie Durham, and they include a number of tunes that later became swing classics:

- "Toby"
- "Moten Swing"
- "The Blue Room"
- "Imagination" (vocals: Sterling Russell Trio)
- "New Orleans" (vocal: Jimmy Rushing)
- "The Only Girl I Ever Loved" (vocals: Sterling Russell Trio)
- "Milenberg Joys"
- "Lafayette"
- "Prince of Wails" (often mistitled as "Prince of Wales")
- "Two Times" (recorded with six musicians and with vocalist Josephine Garrison)

Moten died at Kansas City's Wheatley-Provident Hospital on April 2, 1935, following a failed tonsillectomy.

Nathan W. Pearson Jr. summarized Bennie Moten's influence on Kansas City's jazz legacy: "Among Kansas City musicians . . . the city, the style, and the era of its flowering are virtually synonymous with the Bennie Moten Orchestra."

== Band personnel ==
The complete personnel of Bennie Moten's Kansas City Orchestra, as of 1926-1927 when the band was at the peak of its early popularity, was:

- Ed Lewis, trumpet
- Lamar (or Lammar) Wright, trumpet
- Thamon Hayes, trombone
- Harlan Leonard, alto sax
- Jack Washington, alto and baritone saxes
- Woodie Walder, tenor sax
- Bennie Moten, piano
- Leroy Berry, banjo
- Vernon Page, tuba
- Willie McWashington, drums

=== Vocalists ===
- Mary H. Bradford – 1923
- Ada Brown – 1923

== See also ==
- Kansas City Jazz
