= List of nicknames of jazz musicians =

Nicknames are common among jazz musicians. Nicknames and sobriquets can also sometimes become stage names, and there are several cases of performers being known almost exclusively by their nicknames as opposed to their given names. Some of the most notable nicknames and stage names are listed here.

Although the term Jazz royalty exists for "Kings" and similar royal or aristocratic nicknames, there is a wide range of other terms, many of them obscure. Where the origin of the nickname is known, this is explained at each artist's corresponding article.

== List of jazz nicknames ==
=== A ===
- Abbey: Abbey Lincoln
- Abbie: Albert Brunies
- Ace: Ace Harris
- Angry Man of Jazz (The): Charles Mingus
- Ananias Garibaldi: A.G. Godley

=== B ===
- Babs: Babs Gonzales
- Baby: Warren Dodds
- Baby Sweets: Walter Perkins
- Bags: Milt Jackson
- Barney: Barney Bigard
- Barney: Barney Wilen
- Baron: Charles Mingus
- Bass: Ernest Hill
- Bean: Coleman Hawkins a.k.a. "Hawk"
- Bear (The): Eddie Costa
- Beaver: Beaver Harris
- Betty Bebop: Betty Carter
- Benny: Benny Bailey
- Big Babe: Andrew Webb
- Big Bill: Big Bill Bissonnette
- Big Chief: Big Chief Russell Moore
- Big Daddy: Eric Dixon
- Big-Eye: Louis Nelson Delisle
- Big Jim: Jim Robinson
- Big Joe: Big Joe Turner
- Big John: John Patton
- Big Mama: Big Mama Thornton
- Big Nick: Big Nick Nicholas
- Big Sid: Sid Catlett
- Billie: Billie Holiday a.k.a. "Lady Day"
- Bing: Bing Crosby
- Bird: Charlie Parker a.k.a. "Yardbird"
- Bix: Leon Bismarck Beiderbecke, though it appears his given names were Leon Bix.
- Blood: James "Blood" Ulmer
- Blue: Richard Allen "Blue" Mitchell
- Blue Lou: Lou Marini
- Blow It: J. T. Brown aka Nature Boy Brown
- Bobo: Bobo Stenson
- Bogey: Wilton Gaynair
- Bones: Tom Malone
- Boogaloo Joe: Ivan "Boogaloo Joe" Jones
- Boogaloo: James "Boogaloo" Bolden
- Book: Booker Ervin
- Boots: Clifford Douglas
- Boots: Boots Mussulli
- Bootsie: Bootsie Barnes
- Booty: Booty Wood
- Bops Junior: Oliver Jackson
- Bounce: George Mraz
- Brick: Brick Fleagle
- Brother: Brother Jack McDuff
- Brother Ray: Ray Charles, aka "The High Priest"
- Brownie: Clifford Brown
- Brute (The), Frog: Ben Webster
- Bruz: Bruz Freeman
- Bu: Art Blakey took the name "Abdullah Ibn Buhaina" after a reported trip to Africa. Friends shortened it to "Bu"
- Bubba: Bubba Brooks
- Bubber: James "Bubber" Miley
- Buck: Leroy Berry
- Buck: Wilbur Clayton
- Buck: Buck Hill
- Bucky: Bucky Pizzarelli
- Bud: Bud Brisbois
- Bud: Bud Freeman
- Bud: Bud Powell
- Bud: Bud Shank
- Budd: Budd Johnson (not to be confused with Buddy Johnson)
- Buddie: Buddie Petit
- Buddy: Bernard Anderson a.k.a. "Step-Buddy"
- Buddy: Buddy Banks (bassist)
- Buddy: Buddy Banks (saxophonist)
- Buddy: Buddy Bolden a.k.a. "King"
- Buddy: Buddy Catlett
- Buddy: Buddy Childers
- Buddy: Buddy Clark
- Buddy: Buddy Collette
- Buddy: Buddy DeFranco
- Buddy: Buddy Featherstonhaugh
- Buddy: Buddy Johnson (not to be confused with Budd Johnson)
- Buddy: Buddy Montgomery
- Buddy: Buddy Morrow
- Buddy: Buddy Rich
- Buddy: Buddy Tate
- Buddy: Buddy Williams
- Bumps: Robert Blackwell
- Bunk: Bunk Johnson
- Bunky: Bunky Green
- Bunny: Rowland Berigan
- Buster: Buster Bailey
- Buster: Buster Bennett a.k.a. "Leap Frog" Bennett
- Buster: Buster Cooper
- Buster: Buster Harding
- Buster: Buster Smith a.k.a. "Professor"
- Buster: Buster Williams
- Buster: Buster Wilson
- Butter: Quentin Jackson
- Butch: Butch Ballard
- Butch: Butch Miles
- Butch: Butch Morris
- Buzzy: Buzzy Drootin

=== C ===
- Cab: Cab Kaye
- Cag: Cag Cagnolatti
- Cake: Al "Cake" Wichard
- Candy: Otis Finch
- Candy: Floyd "Candy" Johnson
- Cannonball: Julian Adderley
- Captain: Captain John Handy
- Cat: William Alonzo Anderson
- Cat (The): Jimmy Smith
- Chairman of the Board: Frank Sinatra a.k.a. "Ol' Blue Eyes", "The Voice"
- Chick: Chick Corea
- Chick: Chick Webb
- Chico: Alfred "Chico" Alvarez
- Chico: Chico Freeman
- Chico: Chico O'Farrill
- Chink: Chink Martin
- Chippie: Bertha Hill
- Chu: Leon "Chu" Berry
- Chubby: Chubby Jackson
- Chummy: Chummy MacGregor
- Cie: Cie Frazier
- Cleanhead: Eddie Vinson
- Clyde: Clyde Lombardi
- Conte: Conte Candoli
- Coop: Bob Cooper
- Cootie: Charles Williams
- Corky: Corky Corcoran
- Corky: Corky Cornelius
- Cornbread: Hal Singer
- Count: Count Basie
- Count (The): Conte Candoli
- Count (The): Steve Marcus
- Cow Cow: Charles Edward Davenport
- Cozy: Cozy Cole
- Crane: Dave Burns
- Crazy: Chris Columbus
- Cutty: Cutty Cutshall

=== D ===
- Dee: Dee Barton
- Dee Dee: Dee Dee Bridgewater
- Deedles: Diane Schuur
- Dewey: Dewey Redman
- Dicky: Dicky Wells
- Dink: Dink Johnson
- Dink: Harold Taylor
- Dippermouth: Louis Armstrong a.k.a. "Satchmo", "Pops", "Satchel Mouth", "Dipper Mouth"
- Divine One (The): Sarah Vaughan a.k.a. "Sassy"
- Diz: Diz Disley
- Dizzy, or Diz: John Birks Gillespie
- Dizzy: Dizzy Reece
- Django: Jean Baptiste Reinhardt
- Doc: Doc Cheatham
- Doc: Doc Cook
- Doc: Doc Evans
- Doc: Doc Goldberg
- Doc: Doc Souchon
- Doc: Doc West
- Doctor Miller: Glenn Miller
- Dodo: Michael Marmarosa
- Dollar: Dollar Brand
- Dolo: Dolo Coker
- Duck: Donald Bailey
- Dud: Dud Bascomb
- Duke: Duke Ellington
- Duke: Duke Groner
- Duke: Duke Jordan
- Duke (The): Bennie Green
- Duke: Duke Pearson

=== E ===
- Eddie Lang: Salvatore Massaro
- Eubie: Eubie Blake
- Ella: Ella Fitzgerald

=== F ===
- Fat Boy: Fats Navarro
- Fat Girl: Fats Navarro
- Fatha: Earl Hines
- Fathead: David Newman
- Fats: Jimmy Ponder
- Fats: Fats Sadi
- Fats Waller: Thomas Waller
- Fatty: Fatty George
- Fess: Fess Williams
- Fess: Henry Roeland Byrd a.k.a "Professor Longhair"
- Fiddler: Claude "Fiddler" Williams
- First Lady (The): Ella Fitzgerald a.k.a. "the First Lady of Song"
- Flip: Flip Phillips,
- Foots: Walter "Foots" Thomas
- Fox (The): Maynard Ferguson
- Frog: Waldren Joseph
- Frog: Ben Webster
- Fud: Fud Livingston

=== G ===
- Gatemouth: Clarence Brown
- Gato: Gato Barbieri
- Gator: Willis Jackson
- Geechie: Geechie Fields
- Geechy: James Robinson (musician)
- Gigi: Gigi Gryce
- Ginger: Ginger Smock
- God: Art Tatum
- Goz: Conrad Gozzo
- Great Dane (The): Niels-Henning Ørsted Pedersen
- Great Dane with the Never-Ending Name (The): Niels-Henning Ørsted Pedersen
- Groaner (The): Bing Crosby
- Groove: Richard Holmes
- Guvnor (The): Ken Colyer

=== H ===
- Habao: Joe Texidor
- Half-Pint: Frankie Jaxon
- Ham: Leonard Davis
- Hammond: Johnny "Hammond" Smith
- Hamp or Mad Lionel: Lionel Hampton
- Hank: Hank Crawford
- Hannibal: Hannibal Lokumbe
- Happy: Happy Caldwell
- Happy: David "Happy" Williams
- Hawk: Coleman Hawkins a.k.a. "Bean"
- Hazy: Hazy Osterwald
- Hi De Ho: Cab Calloway
- High Priest, The: Ray Charles, a.k.a. "Brother Ray"
- High Priest of Bop Thelonious Monk
- High Priestess of Soul Nina Simone
- Hipster (The): Harry Gibson
- Hod: Hod O'Brien
- Hog: Leroy Cooper
- Honeybear: Gene Sedric
- Hootie: Jay McShann
- Horacee: Horace Arnold
- Hoss: Walter Page
- Hot Lips: Henry Busse
- Hot Lips or Lips: Oran Page
- Howdy: Howard "Howdy" Quicksell

=== I ===
- Iggy: Iggy Shevak
- Illinois: Illinois Jacquet
- Ivory: Herman Chittison
- Ivory: Harold Ivory Williams

=== J ===
- Jabali: Billy Hart
- Jabbo: Jabbo Smith
- Jaco: Jaco Pastorius
- Jack: Jack Jenney
- Jack: Jack Teagarden
- Jackie: Jackie McLean
- Jaki: Jaki Byard
- Jap: Jap Allen
- Jaws: Eddie "Lockjaw" Davis
- Jay: Jay Clayton
- Jay: Jay McShann a.k.a. "Hootie"
- Jef: Jef Gilson
- Jeep: Johnny Hodges a.k.a. "Rab" (short for "Rabbit")
- Jeepy: Branford Marsalis a.k.a. "Steepee"/"Steepy"
- Jelly Roll: Ferdinand Joseph LaMothe
- Jeru: Gerry Mulligan
- Jiggs: Jiggs Whigham
- Jiunie: Jiunie Booth
- Jiver: Jiver Hutchinson
- Joe Blade: Nick LaRocca
- Johnny Mac: John McLaughlin
- Josh: Josh Billings
- Judge: Milt Hinton
- Jug or Jughead: Gene Ammons
- Junior: Junior Cook
- Junior: Junior Mance
- Junior: Junior Raglin
- J. R.: J. R. Monterose

=== K ===
- Kaiser: Kaiser Marshall
- Kansas: Kansas Fields
- Kat: Herbert Cowans
- Keg: Keg Johnson
- Kermit: Kermit Driscoll
- Keter: Keter Betts
- Kid: Kid Howard
- Kid: Kid Ory
- Kid: Kid Rena
- Kid Sheik: Kid Sheik
- Kidd: Kidd Jordan
- King: Buddy Bolden
- King: Nat King Cole a.k.a. "Shorty Nadine"
- King: King Curtis
- King: King Fleming
- King: Freddie Keppard
- King: Joe Oliver a.k.a. "Papa Joe"
- King: King Pleasure
- King: King Watzke
- King Kolax: King Kolax
- King of the Clarinet: Artie Shaw
- King of Cool: Dean Martin
- King of Jazz: Paul Whiteman
- King of the Jazz Guitar: Django Reinhardt
- King of the Jukebox: Louis Jordan
- King of Swing: Benny Goodman a.k.a. "the Patriarch of the Clarinet", "the Professor", "Swing's Senior Statesman"
- Klook-Mop or Klook: Kenny Clarke
- Knife (The): Pepper Adams

=== L ===
- Lady Day: Billie Holiday
- Leap Frog: Buster Bennett
- Lion (The): Willie Smith
- Lips or Hot Lips: Oran Page
- Little: Benny Harris
- Little Bear: Chester Zardis
- Little Bird: Albert Ayler
- Little Bird: Jimmy Heath
- Little Brother: Little Brother Montgomery
- Little Giant: Johnny Griffin
- Little Jazz: Roy Eldridge
- Little Johnny C: Johnny Coles
- Little Man: Walter Buchanan
- Little Mitch: George Mitchell
- Lockjaw: Eddie "Lockjaw" Davis
- Long Tall Dexter: Dexter Gordon
- Lord: Chauncey "Lord" Westbrook
- Lovie: Lovie Austin
- Luckey: Luckey Roberts
- Lucky: Lucky Millinder
- Lucky: Eli Thompson

=== M ===
- Ma: Ma Rainey
- Mad Lionel: Lionel Hampton a.k.a. "Hamp"
- Maffy: Muvaffak "Maffy" Falay
- Maggie: Howard McGhee
- Maharaja: Oscar Peterson
- Major: Glenn Miller
- Man (The): Sam Taylor
- Manzie: Manzie Johnson
- Mash: Art Blakey
- Mex: Paul Gonsalves
- Mezz: Mezz Mezzrow
- Mick: Mick Mulligan
- Mickey: Mickey McMahan
- Midge: Midge Williams
- Miff: Miff Mole
- Mighty Flea (The): Gene Conners
- Miles: Miles Davis
- Min: Min Leibrook
- Minor: Minor Hall
- Mohawk: Ted Sturgis
- Money: Money Johnson
- Monk: Monk Hazel
- Monk: Monk McFay
- Monk: William Montgomery
- Montudie: Ed Garland
- Monty: Monty Waters
- Moonface, Wurmpth: Claude Thornhill
- Mouse: Irving Randolph
- Mousie or Mousey: Elmer Alexander
- Mr. Bongo: Jack Costanzo
- Mr. Clock: Freddie Green
- Mr. Five by Five: Jimmy Rushing
- Mr. Lead: Derek Watkins
- Mr. T: Stanley Turrentine aka "The Sugar Man"
- Muffin, The Lamb: Donald Lambert
- Muggsy: Muggsy Spanier
- Mule: Major Holley
- Munn: Munn Ware
- Mutt: Tom Carey a.k.a. "Papa Mutt"

=== N ===
- Nappy: Earle Howard
- Nappy: Hilton Lamare
- Nature Boy: J. T. Brown aka "Blow It" Brown
- Newark Flash: Wayne Shorter
- Newk: Sonny Rollins
- NHØP: Niels-Henning Ørsted Pedersen
- Nick: Nick LaRocca

=== O ===
- O Bruxo (The Sorcerer): Hermeto Pascoal
- Ol' Blue Eyes: Frank Sinatra a.k.a. "The Voice"
- Ool-Ya-Koo: Willie Cook
- Osie: Osie Johnson

=== P ===
- Panama: Panama Francis
- Pancho: Kenny Hagood
- Papa: Papa Celestin
- Papa: Louis "Papa" Tio
- Papa Jack: Papa Jack Laine
- Papa Jo: Jonathan David Samuel Jones
- Papa Joe: Joe "King" Oliver
- Papa Mutt: Thomas Carey a.k.a. Mutt Carey
- Pat: Pat Patrick
- Patriarch of the Clarinet (the): Benny Goodman a.k.a. "the Professor", "Swing's Senior Statesman", "the King of Swing"
- Peanuts: Peanuts Holland
- Peanuts: Peanuts Hucko
- Peck: Peck Kelley
- Pee Wee: H. B. Barnum
- Pee Wee: Alfred "Pee Wee" Ellis
- Pee Wee: Pee Wee Erwin
- Pee Wee: Pee Wee Hunt
- Pee Wee: Pee Wee Russell
- Pee Wee: Leon "Pee Wee" Whittaker
- Pepper: Pepper Adams a.k.a. "the Knife"
- Pete: Pete Candoli
- Pete: Pete Johnson
- Pha: Pha Terrell
- Pharoah: Farrell Sanders
- Phantom: Joe Henderson
- Philly Joe: Joseph Jones
- Pinetop: Pinetop Perkins (Joseph William Perkins)
- Pinetop: Clarence Smith a.k.a. "Pine Top"
- Polo: Polo Barnes
- Pony: Norwood Poindexter
- Pops: Sidney Bechet
- Pops: Louis Armstrong a.k.a. "Satchel Mouth", "Satchmo", "Dipper Mouth"
- Pops: George Murphy "Pops" Foster
- Pops: Robert Popwell
- Porky: Al Porcino
- Pretty: Bernard Purdie
- Pres (preferred spelling) or Prez (short for "President"): Lester Young
- Prince of Darkness: Miles Davis
- Professor Longhair: Henry Roeland Byrd
- Professor, the: Cab Calloway
- Professor (the): Benny Goodman a.k.a. "the Patriarch of the Clarinet", "Swing's Senior Statesman", "the King of Swing"
- Pud: Pud Brown
- Punch: Punch Miller

=== Q ===
- Queen: Peggy Lee
- Queen of the Jukeboxes: Dinah Washington

=== R ===
- Rabbit: Johnny Hodges a.k.a. "Rab", "Jeep"
- Rap: Leon Roppolo
- Ray: Ray Bryant
- Reb: Reb Spikes
- Red: Red Allen
- Red: Red Balaban
- Red: Tom Brown
- Red: Red Callender
- Red: Red Garland
- Red: Red Holloway
- Red: Red Ingle
- Red: Red McKenzie
- Red: Keith Moore "Red" Mitchell
- Red: Robert Muse
- Red: Red Nichols
- Red: Red Norvo
- Red: Red Prysock
- Red: Red Richards
- Red: Red Saunders
- Red: Alvin Tyler
- Red Rodney: Red Rodney
- Rosy: Rosy McHargue
- Rusty: Rusty Bryant
- Rusty: Lyle Dedrick
- Rusty: Rusty Jones

=== S ===
- Sabby: Sabby Lewis
- Santy: Santy Runyon
- Sassy: Sarah Vaughan a.k.a. "The Divine One"
- Satchmo: Louis Armstrong a.k.a. "Dipper Mouth", "Pops", "Satchel Mouth"
- Sax: Sax Mallard
- Scoops: Scoops Carey
- Scotty: Howard "Scotty" Scott
- Scotty: Kermit Scott
- Scrappy: Scrappy Lambert
- Senator (the): Eugene Wright
- Shadow: Rossiere Wilson
- Shake: Shake Keane
- Sharkey: Joseph Bonano
- Shifty: Shifty Henry
- Shorty: Harold Baker
- Shorty: Shorty Rogers
- Shorty: Shorty Sherock
- Sippie: Sippie Wallace
- Sir: Sir Charles Thompson
- Sir James: Jimmy Nottingham
- Skeeter: Clifton Best
- Skeets: Skeets Herfurt
- Skeets: Skeets Tolbert
- Skip: Skip Martin
- Skippy: Skippy Williams
- Skitch: Skitch Henderson
- Slam: Slam Stewart
- Slats: Slats Long
- Sleepy Hall: Chick Bullock
- Slide: Slide Hampton
- Slim: Bulee Gaillard
- Slim: Alton Moore
- Slow Drag: Alcide Pavageau
- Smack: Fletcher Henderson
- Smith: Smith Ballew
- Smitty: Marvin Smith
- Snake: Harvey Mandel
- Snakehips: Ken Snakehips Johnson
- Snap Crackle: Roy Haynes
- Snub: Snub Mosley
- Sonny: Sonny Berman
- Sonny: Sonny Blount
- Sonny: Sonny Brown
- Sonny: Sonny Clark
- Sonny: Sonny Clay
- Sonny: Sonny Cohn
- Sonny: Sonny Criss
- Sonny: Sonny Dallas
- Sonny: Sonny Dunham
- Sonny: Sonny Greer
- Sonny: Sonny Henry
- Sonny: Sonny Igoe
- Sonny: Sonny Lester
- Sonny: Sonny Parker
- Sonny: Sonny Payne
- Sonny: Sonny Rollins a.k.a. "Newk"
- Sonny: Sonny Russo
- Sonny: Sonny Sharrock
- Sonny: Sonny Simmons
- Sonny: Edward Stitt
- Sonny: Sonny White
- Sound (the): Stan Getz
- Spanky: Spanky Davis
- Spanky: Spanky DeBrest
- Specs: Gordon Powell
- Specs: Specs Wright
- Spider: Cyril Haynes
- Spike: Spike Heatley
- Spike: Spike Hughes
- Spike: Spike Robinson
- Spike: Spike Wells
- Spoon: Jimmy Witherspoon
- Spud: Spud Murphy
- Stan: Stan Hasselgård
- Steepee (Steepy): Branford Marsalis a.k.a. "Jeepy"
- Stix: Stix Hooper
- Stork (the): Paul Desmond
- Stuff: Stuff Combe
- Stuff: Stuff Smith
- Stump: Stump Evans
- Stumpy: Stumpy Brady
- Sunny: Sunny Murray
- Swee' Pea: Billy Strayhorn
- Sweets: Harry Edison
- Swing's Senior Statesman: Benny Goodman a.k.a. "the Patriarch of the Clarinet", "the Professor", "the King of Swing"
- Sy: Sy Oliver

=== T ===
- Tab: Tab Smith
- Tain: Jeff "Tain" Watts
- Teddy: Teddy Brannon
- Teddy: Teddy Kleindin
- Teddy: Teddy Stauffer
- Teo: Teo Macero
- Terry: Terry Gibbs
- Tex: Tex Beneke
- Tex: Herschel Evans
- The Ghost: Earl Washington
- The Sugar Man: Stanley Turrentine aka "Mr. T"
- Tiger: Tiger Haynes
- Tina: Tina Brooks
- Tiny: Tiny Davis
- Tiny: Tiny Grimes
- Tiny: Tiny Hill
- Tiny: Tiny Kahn
- Tiny: Tiny Parham
- Tiny: Tiny Taylor
- Tiny: Tiny Winters
- Tito: Tito Burns
- Toby: Scoville Browne
- Toby: Otto Hardwick
- Tom: Tom Archia
- Tootie: Albert "Tootie" Heath
- Toots: Toots Mondello
- Toots: Toots Thielemans
- Tram: Frank Trumbauer
- Trane: John Coltrane
- Tricky Sam: Joe Nanton
- Truck: Truck Parham
- Trummy: Trummy Young
- Trump: Trump Davidson
- Tubby: Tubby Hall
- Tubby: Tubby Hayes a.k.a. "Tubbs"
- Tuff: Tuff Green
- Turk: Turk Murphy
- Turk: Turk Van Lake
- Tuts: Tuts Washington
- Tutti: Tutti Camarata

=== V ===
- Velvet Fog (The): Mel Tormé
- Vice Prez: Paul Quinichette
- Voice (The): Frank Sinatra a.k.a. "Ol' Blue Eyes"
- Vonski: Von Freeman

=== W ===
- Wah Wah: Wah Wah Watson
- Wes: Wes Montgomery
- Whitey: Gordon "Whitey" Mitchell
- Wig (The): Gerald Wiggins
- Wild: Wild Bill Davis
- Wild: Bill Davison
- Wingy: Joseph Manone
- Wooden: Wooden Joe Nicholas

=== Y ===
- Yank: Yank Lawson
- Yardbird: Charlie Parker a.k.a. "Bird"
- Yellow: Alcide Nunez

=== Z ===
- Ziggy: Ziggy Elman
- Zinky: Zinky Cohn
- Zoot: Jack Sims
- Zutty: Zutty Singleton

== See also ==
- Jazz royalty
- List of best-selling music artists
- List of honorific titles in popular music
- List of stage names
- List of nicknames of blues musicians
- Lists of nicknames – nickname list articles on Wikipedia
