= Herschel Evans =

American jazz saxophonist (1909–1939)

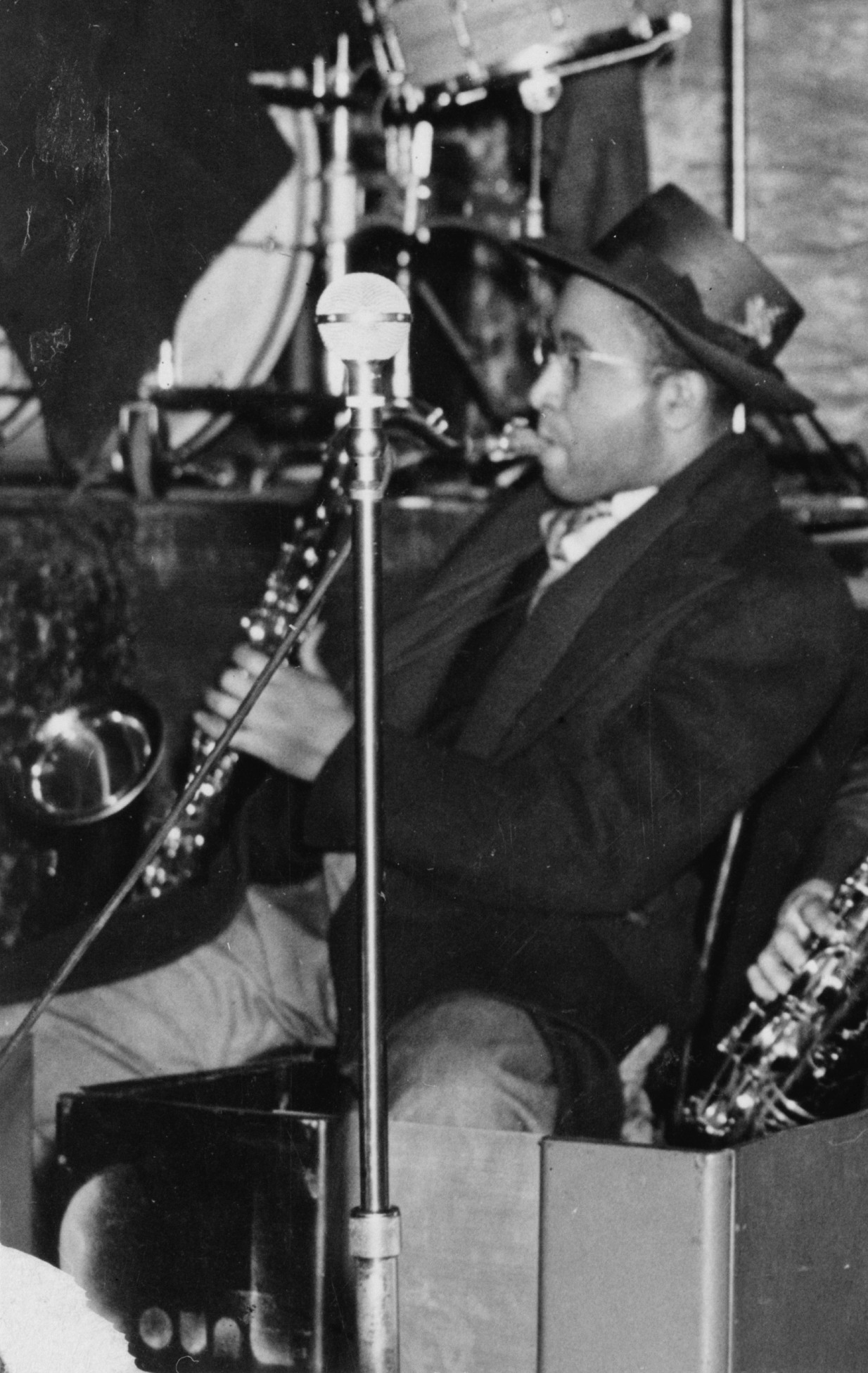
- Herschel Evans, c. 1939

Background information
- Born: March 9, 1909; Denton, Texas, U.S.
- Died: February 9, 1939 (aged 29) New York City, U.S.
- Genre: Jazz
- Occupation: Musician
- Instrument: Tenor saxophone
- Years active: 1920s–1939
- Formerly of: Count Basie Orchestra

Herschel "Tex" Evans (March 9, 1909 – February 9, 1939) was an American jazz tenor saxophonist who was a member of the Count Basie Orchestra. He also worked with Lionel Hampton and Buck Clayton. He is the cousin of Joe McQueen, also a jazz saxophonist.

== Life and career ==
Evans was born in Denton, Texas, (Note: A 1973 source, Biographical Dictionary of American Music, states that Evans was born in Denton, Texas. But a 1940 source, by Earl J. Morris as published in the Pittsburgh Courier, states that he was born in Temple, Texas (see inline citations, below).) but spent some of his childhood in Kansas City, Kansas, where his cousin Eddie Durham was a trombonist and guitarist. Durham persuaded him to switch from alto to tenor saxophone, the instrument that ultimately established Evans's reputation. After perfecting his craft in the jam sessions held in the jazz district between Twelfth and Eighteenth streets in Kansas City, Evans returned to Texas in the 1920s and joined the Troy Floyd orchestra in San Antonio in 1929. He stayed with this territory band until it dispersed in 1932. Evans performed for a time with Lionel Hampton and Buck Clayton in Los Angeles, and in the mid-1930s returned to Kansas City to become a featured soloist in Count Basie's big band.

For the next three years, Evans's prominence as a tenor saxophonist was at its peak, and he participated in musical duels with fellow band member Lester Young. Count Basie's "One O'Clock Jump" featured the contrasting styles of the two musicians and brought to each the praise of both critics and the general public. Evans's greatest single success was his featured solo on Basie's hit "Blue and Sentimental". A recently discovered recording of "Blue and Sentimental" by Basie's orchestra performing at the Famous Door jazz club features Evans on tenor saxophone and vocals by Helen Humes.

Evans also made records with jazz musicians such as Harry James, Teddy Wilson, and Lionel Hampton. Evans has been credited with influencing fellow tenorist Buddy Tate – who, in 1939, came from the Nat Towles band in Omaha to replace Evans in the Basie band following Evans's death. He is also credited for influencing Illinois Jacquet and Arnett Cobb. Although not a prolific composer, Evans wrote "Texas Shuffle" and "Doggin' Around", among other pieces.

== Death ==
Evans was a member of the Count Basie Orchestra from September 1936 until his death.

Evans became ill while playing with Basie at the Howard Theatre in Washington, D.C., sometime during the week from January 13 to January 19, 1939. He did not feel well enough to make the Basie band's session with Decca on February 3; Chu Berry substituted. He collapsed while performing a one-nighter on February 6 with the Basie band at the Crystal Ballroom in Hartford, Connecticut; he was rushed to Wadsworth Hospital in New York City at 629 West 185th Street.

Evans died February 9, 1939, at the age of 29 of heart disease in New York City while the Basie band was playing a one-nighter in Toledo, Ohio. His body was transferred to Los Angeles and interred on February 14, St. Valentine's Day, at Angelus-Rosedale Cemetery.

Basie's recording session in New York with Decca on January 5, 1939, was Evans's final recording:

- Count Basie and His Orchestra, Decca 2249

Buck Clayton, Ed Lewis, Shad Collins, Harry Edison (trumpets); Dicky Wells, Dan Minor, Benny Morton (trombones); Earle Warren (alto sax); Herschel Evans, Lester Young (tenor saxes); Jack Washington (alto and bari sax); Count Basie (piano); Freddie Green (guitar); Walter Page (bass); Jo Jones (drums); Helen Humes (vocals)
Both numbers were arranged by Jimmy Mundy and Helen Humes sang on both
Recorded in New York, January 5, 1939
64851-A "My Heart Belongs to Daddy"; OCLC 159936240, 44142977
65852-A "Sing for Your Supper"; OCLC 81828421

== Orchestra memberships ==
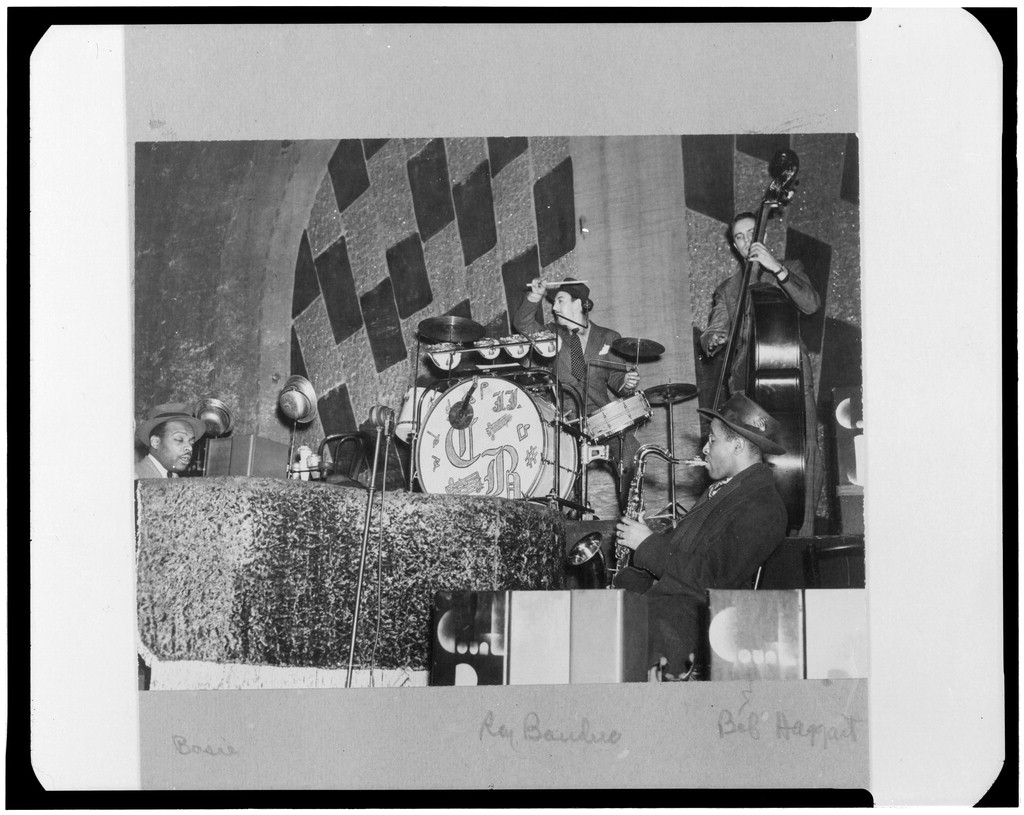
A jam session including members of the Count Basie Orchestra in the late 1930s. From left: Basie, Ray Bauduc, Evans, and Bob Haggart.

Evans was a member of the following orchestras:

- Smith Brothers Orchestra
- Trent's Number Two – Evans performed with TNT in 1927
- St. Louis Merrymakers – Evans performed when them around 1928
- Edgar Battle
- Terrence Holder
- George Corley
- Troy Floyd (1901–1953) and His Shadowland Orchestra, San Antonio – Evans performed with Floyd from 1929 to 1932
- Lee Palmer
- Mamie Smith (1883–1946)
- Durham Brothers Orchestra
  - Joseph Durham Jr. (brother), director, double bass, and tuba
  - Earl Durham (brother)
  - Roosevelt Durham (brother)
  - Eddie Durham (1906–1987) (brother)
  - Myrtle Durham (sister), piano
  - Allen Durham (cousin), trombone
  - Clyde Durham (cousin)
- Ed Bailey Orchestra
- Charles Echoles (né Charles Richard Echols; 1901–1957)
- Bennie Moten – Evans performed with Moten from 1933 to 1935
- Lionel Hampton – Evans performed for stints with Hampton in 1936
- Buck Clayton – Evans performed for stints with Clayton in 1936
- Count Basie – Evans performed with Basie from 1937 until his death

== Selected discography and sessionography ==
Compilation

- Count Basie, The Original American Decca Recordings (GRP, 1937-39 [1992]); OCLC 221427063, 872062838

Original sessions

- Troy Floyd and His Shadowland Orchestra

Recorded in San Antonio, Texas, June 21, 1929
402696-B: "Dreamland Blues," part 1 (pt 1); OCLC 8175844
402697-B: "Dreamland Blues," part 2 (pt 2); OCLC 8193236

- Richard M. Jones: Jones' Chicago Cosmopolitans

Recorded in Chicago, September 13, 1935
90323-A: "Joe Louis Chant"
90324-A: "Baby O'Mine"

- Count Basie And His Orchestra

Buck Clayton, Joe Keyes, Carl Smith (trumpets); George Hunt, Dan Minor (trombones); Caughey Roberts (alto saxes); Herschel Evans, Lester Young (tenor saxes); Jack Washington (baritone sax); Count Basie (piano); Claude Williams (guitar); Walter Page (bass); Jo Jones (drums); Jimmy Rushing (vocals)
Recorded in New York, January 21, 1937
61542-A: "Honeysuckle Rose", Decca 1141; OCLC 28939085
61543-A: "Pennies From Heaven", Decca 1121, (Swi)M-39027, Br (E)02379, 80163,
61544-A: "Swingin' at the Daisy Chain," Decca 1121
61545-A: "Roseland Shuffle," Decca 1141; OCLC 28939085

- Count Basie

Claude Williams (guitar, violin 1); Leslie Williams (master of ceremonies)
Radio broadcast, live "The Chatterbox", William Penn Hotel, Pittsburgh, Pennsylvania, February 8, 1937
"Lady Be Good
"St. Louis Blues"
"Moten Swing" (theme and closing)
"Shoe Shine Swing" ("Roseland Shuffle")
"Moten Swing" (theme and close)

== Selected compositions ==
- "Doggin' Around"

Words and music by Edgar Battle and Herschel Evans
Copyright September 19, 1938
Class E (musical composition, unpublished) 177494
Lewis Music Publishing Co., New York (Note: Vol. 33, Part 2, September 1938, Nos. 10–12 (1938), pg. 1256)

- "Texas Shuffle"

Words and music by Edgar Battle and Herschel Evans
1st copy October 17, 1938
Class E (musical composition, unpublished) 179121
Lewis Music Publishing Co., New York (Note: Vol. 33, Part 2, October 1938, Nos. 10–12 (1938), pg. 1534)

Edgar Battle sued Lewis Publishing Company in 1952 for failing to adequately promote songs that he published with them.
