= Carl "Tatti" Smith =

American jazz trumpeter (born 1908; died)

Carl "Tatti" Smith (born c. 1908, date of death unknown) was an American jazz trumpeter, best known for his performances with Count Basie and others in the 1930s and 1940s.

== Early life ==
He was born in Marshall, Texas, around 1908. He had a wife named June Carter (1952–2003) and he had four children (Carl Jr., Larry Dean, and Carlene and Lori Lynn). Family members reported that the relationship did not last due to both parties wanting something different.

He played in bands such as those of George Corley and Terrence Holder in and around Kansas City in the early 1930s. He also toured in California with Gene Coy's band, and played in Texas with Alphonso Trent. By 1936 he had returned to Kansas City, where he played in Count Basie's band with Lester Young, Walter Page, Jo Jones, and Jimmy Rushing. He was also co-leader with Jo Jones of a sextet, Jones–Smith, Inc., a faux name given by John Hammond as Basie was under contract to Decca, which gave Lester Young an historical solo. In 1937 he joined Skeets Tolbert's Gentlemen of Swing. In the late 1930s and early 1940s he played with a number of popular bands including those of Benny Carter, Leon Abbey, Oran "Hot Lips" Page, and Chris Columbus.

After the end of World War II, Smith traveled to South America. He performed in Argentina and Brazil during the 1950s. However, no record of him seems to exist after that time.

== Discography ==
=== Singles ===
- Loose Talk (1954)

As session man

- 1937-39 - The Original American Decca Recordings (3xCD) (Decca/GRP, 1992) w Count Basie Orchestra
- 1931-40 - The Chronological and His Gentlemen of Rhythm (Classics,?) w Skeets Tolbert
- 1940-42 - The Chronological and His Gentlemen of Rhythm (Classics, ?) w Skeets Tolbert
