= A. G. Godley =

American jazz drummer

- Born: A. G. Godley (Note: His date of birth is taken from his application for social security, on which he writes “I was never given another name except initials. I have no other name. The initials are my full first name.”); October 17, 1903; Ft. Smith, AR
- Died: February 1973 (aged 69) Seattle, WA
- Genres: Jazz
- Occupation: Musician
- Instrument: Drums

A. G. Godley (17 October 1903 – February 1973) was an American jazz drummer. His contemporaries considered Godley one of the finest big-band drummers in the Southwest.

In 1924, Godley joined the Alphonse Trent Orchestra, the leading band in Dallas at that time, with Terrence Holder on trumpet, and Snub Mosley on trombone. Budd Johnson, referring to Trent's band, later said: "They were gods back in the twenties, just like Basie was later, only many years ahead of him. ... They made $150 a week a man. Imagine! They worked nothing but the biggest and finest hotels in the South". He stayed with Trent's band until 1933, although he left briefly in 1929 to play with Walter Page in 1929 and again, in 1931, to play with Fate Marable. It was while he was with Trent’s band that he was given the nickname Ananias Garibaldi.

He went on to join Snub Mosley’s band (1939–41), and later made a number of recordings in small groups led by Hot Lips Page, Joe Turner, and Pete Johnson.
