= Dan Minor =

American jazz musician (1909–1982)

- Born: Slamfoot Minor; August 10, 1909; Dallas, Texas, U.S.
- Died: April 11, 1982 (aged 72) New York City, New York, U.S.
- Genre: Jazz
- Instrument: Trombone

Dan "Slamfoot" Minor (August 10, 1909 – April 11, 1982) was an American jazz trombonist who featured in the bands of Count Basie, Cab Calloway and many others from the 1920s to the 1940s.

== Early life ==
He was born in Dallas, Texas, and played for a local church orchestra in his teens before joining local band the Blue Moon Chasers and then, in 1927, his first major professional engagement as a member of Walter Page's Blue Devils.

== Career ==
In 1929 Minor joined another band, the Blues Syncopaters led by Ben Smith, and also worked around the same time in bands led by Earl Dykes, Gene Coy, Lloyd Hunter and Alphonse Trent. In 1931, he joined the Bennie Moten band.

He remained with the band after Moten's death in 1935, when its leadership was taken over by Count Basie, and stayed with the Basie orchestra until 1941. During that period he performed at the From Spirituals to Swing concerts in New York City in 1938 and 1939. However, Minor tended to be overshadowed by other trombonists such as Benny Morton and Vic Dickenson, and rarely took solos. He joined the Buddy Johnson band in 1942, and also played around that time with Cab Calloway. He worked with Mercer Ellington in 1945, and also recorded and played with Lucky Millinder and Willie Bryant.

After the 1940s, through to the 1960s, he continued to perform occasionally on a freelance basis.

== Personal life ==
Minor died in New York City in 1982 at the age of 72.

== Discography ==
With Count Basie

- The Original American Decca Recordings (GRP, 1992)
