= Abe Bolar =

American jazz musician

Abe Bolar (March 26, 1908 - February 29, 2000) was an American double bass player.

== Biography ==
Abraham Bolar, Jr. was born on March 26, 1908 in Oklahoma City, Oklahoma. He started playing string bass at the age of 14 in Guthrie, Oklahoma. A couple years later he moved to Oklahoma City. He played with a variety of bands in that city and in the nearby region. By 1932 he had replaced Walter Page as bassist for the Oklahoma City Blue Devils. He was a member of this band until leaving in 1936 to move to New York City (NYC).

In NYC, Bolar, played with Hot Lips Page (1938–1940), Lucky Millinder (1940–1941), and in Count Basie’s orchestra during the early 1940s. In 1939 and 1940 he made recordings with Pete Johnson; including Barrelhouse Breakdown/Kansas City Farewell for Blue Note Records. In 1950 he married the pianist Juanita Burns (Juanita Bolar); performing with her as the jazz duo Nita and Abe. The couple lived continued to live in NYC for more than 20 years during which time Bolar had a lengthy position as a member of pianist Benton Heath's jazz combo which was in residence at the New Gardens club.. Bolar had begun playing in this combo prior to their marriage in 1942 and was still with the group until at least 1963. Its other members included trupeter Ed Allen, drummer Floyd Casey, and from 1957 on, reed player Rudy Powell. With his wife he gave performances on television programs like The Dick Clark Show among others.

In 1995 Bolar moved with his wife to Portland, Oregon. She died in 1996. He died in Portland four years later on February 29, 2000.
