= Lem Johnson =

American musician (1909–1989)

Lemuel Charles "Lem" Johnson (August 6, 1909 – April 1, 1989) was an American jazz saxophonist who played both tenor and soprano saxophones.

Johnson was born in Oklahoma City. He played clarinet in local ensembles in the 1920s and picked up saxophone in 1928, playing with Walter Page's Blue Devils. Early in the 1930s he played in the band of Grant Moore (1931–35) in the Milwaukee, Wisconsin area, and then worked with Eli Rice and Earl Hines. In 1937 he moved to New York, where he played with Fess Williams, Luis Russell and Louis Jordan, and joined Skeets Tolbert's band in 1939. In Tolbert's group Johnson sang in addition to playing sax. He recorded with Buster Harding, Eddie Durham, Edgar Hayes, Sidney Bechet, Claude Hopkins, St. Louis Jimmy Oden, Sam "The Man" Taylor and Sammy Price, and also cut some sessions as a leader, which have subsequently been released on compact disc. He also recorded with Johnny Long and his Orchestra on Coral Records (9-61478). After the 1940s he went into semi-retirement and occasionally played into the 1960s. Johnson died in New York City.
