= Walter Page (disambiguation) =

Walter Page (1900–1957) was an American jazz multi-instrumentalist and bandleader.

Walter Page may also refer to:

- Walter Hines Page (1855–1918), American diplomat, United States ambassador to the United Kingdom
- Walter Page (umpire) (died 1958), New Zealand cricket umpire
