= The Original American Decca Recordings =

Compilation album by Count Basie
- Released: March 17, 1992
- Recorded: January 21, 1937 – February 4, 1939
- Genres: Jazz, swing, big band
- Length: 186:02
- Labels: GRP; 3-6112

The Original American Decca Recordings (also released as The Complete Decca Recordings) is a 1992 compilation 3-CD set of sessions led by jazz bandleader Count Basie recorded for the Decca label between 1937 and 1939.

== Reception ==
Professional ratings
Review scores
Source	Rating
AllMusic	5/5 stars
Penguin Guide to Jazz	👑

For AllMusic Scott Yanow wrote "This magnificent three-disc set has the first 63 recordings by Count Basie's Orchestra, all of his Deccas. The consistency is remarkable (with not more than two or three turkeys) and the music is the epitome of swing... This is the first Count Basie collection to acquire and should be in every jazz collection".

The Penguin Guide to Jazz identified this set as part of their suggested "Core Collection" of essential jazz albums and awarded the compilation a "Crown" signifying a recording that the authors "feel a special admiration or affection for".

== Track listing ==
All compositions by Count Basie except where noted.

Disc one: 1937

1. "Honeysuckle Rose" (Andy Razaf, Fats Waller) – 2:58
2. "Pennies from Heaven" (Arthur Johnston, Johnny Burke) – 3:00
3. "Swinging at the Daisy Chain" – 2:48
4. "Roseland Shuffle" – 2:32
5. "Exactly Like You" (Dorothy Fields, Jimmy McHugh) – 2:41
6. "Boo Hoo" (Carmen Lombardo, Edward Heyman, John Jacob Loeb) – 2:25
7. "The Glory of Love" (Billy Hill) – 2:29
8. "Boogie Woogie (I May Be Wrong)" (Count Basie, Jimmy Rushing) – 2:49
9. "Smarty (You Know It All)" (Burton Lane, Ralph Freed) – 2:40
10. "One O'Clock Jump" – 3:00
11. "Listen My Children and You Shall Hear" (Lane, Freed) – 3:05
12. "John's Idea" – 2:53
13. "Good Morning Blues" [1st Take] (Count Basie, Eddie Durham, Jimmy Rushing) – 3:12
14. "Good Morning Blues" [2nd Take] (Basie, Durham, Rushing) – 3:03
15. "Our Love Was Meant to Be" (Alex Hill, Fats Waller, Joe Davis) – 2:45
16. "Time Out" (Durham) – 3:01
17. "Topsy" (Durham) – 3:12
18. "I Keep Remembering" (Charles Newman, Isham Jones) – 2:45
19. "Out the Window" (Basie, Durham) – 3:08
20. "Don't You Miss Your Baby" (Basie, Durham, Rushing) – 3:08
21. "Let Me Dream" (Henry Jerome) – 3:09

Note

- Recorded in New York City on January 21 (tracks 1–4), March 26 (tracks 5–8), July 7 (tracks 9–12), August 9 (tracks 13–17) and October 13 (tracks 18–21), 1937

Disc two: 1938

1. "Georgianna" (Austen Croom-Johnson, Frank Carle, Red McKenzie) – 2:33
2. "Blues in the Dark" – 3:04
3. "Sent for You" (Durham, Rushing) – 2:57
4. "Every Tub" (Basie, Durham) – 3:14
5. "Now Will You Be Good?" (Arthur Terker, Harry Jentes, Harry Pease) – 2:46
6. "Swingin' the Blues" (Basie, Durham) – 2:45
7. "Mama Don't Want No Peas 'n' Rice 'n' Coconut Oil" (L. Charles, L. Wolfe Gilbert) – 2:51
8. "Blue and Sentimental" (Basie, Jerry Livingston, Mack David) – 3:10
9. "Doggin' Around" (Edgar Battle, Herschel Evans) – 3:02
10. "Stop Beatin' Round the Mulberry Bush" [1st Take] (Bickley Reichner, Clay Boland) – 3:01
11. "Stop Beatin' Round the Mulberry Bush" [2nd Take] (Reichner, Boland) – 3:04
12. "London Bridge Is Falling Down" (Abel Baer, Ira Schuster, Tot Seymour) 2:55
13. "Texas Shuffle" (Evans) – 3:07
14. "Jumpin' at the Woodside" – 3:08
15. "How Long Blues" (Leroy Carr) – 2:55
16. "The Dirty Dozen" (Rufus Perryman) – 3:01
17. "Hey Lawdy Mama" (Cleve Reed) – 2:44
18. "The Fives" (Hersal Thomas, George W. Thomas) – 2:45
19. "Boogie Woogie" (Clarence Smith) – 3:01
20. "Dark Rapture" (Benny Goodman, Edgar Sampson, Manny Kurtz) – 2:38
21. "Shorty George" – 2:44
22. "The Blues I Like to Hear" (Buster Smith, Rushing) – 3:07
23. "Do You Wanna Jump, Children?" (Jimmy Van Heusen, Victor Selsman, Willie Bryant) – 2:39
24. "Panassie Stomp" – 2:47

Note

- Recorded in New York City on January 3 (tracks 1 & 2), February 16 (tracks 3–6), June 6 (tracks 7–9), August 12 (tracks 10–14) and November 9 (tracks 15–19) and November 16 (tracks 20–24), 1938

Disc three: 1939

1. "My Heart Belongs to Daddy" (Cole Porter) – 2:54
2. "Sing for Your Supper" (Lorenz Hart, Richard Rodgers) – 2:42
3. "Oh! Red" (Kansas Joe McCoy) – 2:53
4. "Fare Thee Honey, Fare Thee Well" [1st Take] (J. Mayo Williams, John Akers) – 3:04
5. "Fare Thee Honey, Fare Thee Well" [2nd Take] (Williams, Akers) – 3:02
6. "Dupree Blues" (George White, Woody Herman) – 3:04
7. "When the Sun Goes Down" [1st Take] (Carr) – 2:45
8. "When the Sun Goes Down" [2nd Take] (Carr) – 2:54
9. "Red Wagon" (Richard M. Jones) – 2:52
10. "You Can Depend On Me" (Charlie Carpenter, Earl Hines, Louis Dunlap) – 3:07
11. "Cherokee, Part 1" (Ray Noble) – 3:10
12. "Cherokee, Part 2" (Noble) – 3:03
13. "Blame It on My Last Affair" [1st Take] (Henry Nemo, Irving Mills) – 2:43
14. "Blame It on My Last Affair" [2nd Take] (Nemo, Mills) – 2:42
15. "Jive at Five" (Harry Edison) – 2:49
16. "Thursday" (Dorothy Sachs, Irvin Graham, Louis Haber) – 3:04
17. "Evil Blues" (Basie, Edison, Rushing) – 3:13
18. "Oh, Lady Be Good!" (George Gershwin, Ira Gershwin) – 3:10

Note

- Recorded in New York City on January 5 (tracks 1–3), January 26 (tracks 4–9), February 2 (track 10), February 3 (tracks 11–14) and February 4 (tracks 15–18), 1939

== Personnel ==
- Count Basie – piano
- Bobby Moore (tracks: 1–5 to 1–21), Buck Clayton (tracks: 1–1 to 2–14, 2–20 to 3–2, 3–11), Carl "Tatti" Smith (tracks: 1–1 to 1–4), Ed Lewis (tracks: 1–5 to 1–7), Harry Edison (tracks: 2–3 to 2–14, 2–20 to 3–2, 3–11 to 3–18), Joe Keyes (tracks: 1–1 to 1–4), Karl George (tracks: 2–1, 2–2), Shad Collins (tracks: 3–1, 3–2, 3–10 to 3–18) – trumpet
- Benny Morton (tracks: 1–18 to 2–14, 2–20 to 3–2, 3–11 to 3–14, 3–16 to 3–18), Dan Minor (tracks: 1–1 to 2–14, 2–20 to 3–2, 3–11 to 3–14, 3–16 to 3–18), Dicky Wells (tracks: 2–10 to 2–14, 2–20 to 3–2, 3–11 to 3–18), George Hunt (tracks: 1–1 to 1–17) – trombone
- Eddie Durham – trombone, guitar (tracks: 1–13 to 2–9)
- Herschel Evans (tracks: 1–1 to 2–14, 2–20 to 3–2), Lester Young (tracks: 1–1 to 2–14, 2–20 to 3–2, 3–10 to 3–18) – clarinet, tenor saxophone
- Earle Warren (tracks: 1–9 to 2–14, 2–20 to 3–2, 3–11 to 3–14, 3–16 to 3–18) – alto saxophone, vocals
- Caughey Roberts – alto saxophone (tracks: 1–4 to 1–8),
- Jack Washington (tracks: 1–1 to 2–14, 2–20 to 3–2, 3–11 to 3–18) – alto saxophone, baritone saxophone
- Chu Berry (tracks: 3–11 to 3–14, 3–16 to 3–18) – tenor saxophone
- Claude Williams (tracks: 1–1 to 1–4), Freddie Green (tracks: 1–5 to 3–18) – guitar
- Walter Page – bass
- Jo Jones – drums
- Helen Humes (tracks: 2–20, 3–1, 3–2, 3–13, 3–14, 3–16), Jimmy Rushing (tracks: 1–1, 1–5, 1–6, 1–8, 1–11, 1–13, 1–14, 1–18, 1–20, 2–1 to 2–3, 2–5, 2–7, 2–10 to 2–12, 2–22, 2–23, 3–10, 3–17) – vocals
