= Brubeck and Rushing =

Studio album by Dave Brubeck and Jimmy Rushing
- Released: 1960
- Recorded: January 29 – August 4, 1960
- Genre: Vocal jazz
- Length: 36:14
- Label: Columbia CL1553
- Producer: Teo Macero

Dave Brubeck chronology
Brubeck à la mode (1960)	Brubeck and Rushing (1960)	Southern Scene (1960)

Jimmy Rushing chronology
Rushing Lullabies (1960)	Brubeck and Rushing (1960)	Jimmy Rushing and the Smith Girls (1960)

Brubeck and Rushing is a 1960 album by The Dave Brubeck Quartet and the singer Jimmy Rushing.

== Reception ==
Professional ratings
Review scores
Source	Rating
Allmusic	3/5 stars
The Penguin Guide to Jazz Recordings	3.5/4 stars
DownBeat	4/5 stars

The initial Billboard magazine review from 31 December 1960 commented that "This is surely a most intriguing jazz package. ...It's a swinging affair, with spontaneity and zest, and Brubeck is to be commended for being able to provide such a proper showcase for the vocalist"

The album was reviewed by Scott Yanow at Allmusic who wrote that "On ten standards Brubeck, altoist Paul Desmond and the Quartet fit in perfectly behind the great swing/blues singer Jimmy Rushing who sounds rejuvenated by the fresh setting. This disc, a surprising success, is well worth searching for."

John S. Wilson assigned the album 4 stars in DownBeat. He wrote, "the use of the Brubeck quartet has put all of these pieces, which come out of the Rushing repertory rather than Brubeck’s, in a fresh light . . . The entire meeting is very relaxed and refreshing".

== Track listing ==
1. "There'll Be Some Changes Made" (William Blackstone, W. Benton Overstreet) – 2:10
2. "My Melancholy Baby" (Ernie Burnett, George A. Norton) – 4:01
3. "Blues in the Dark" (Count Basie, Jimmy Rushing) – 4:42
4. "I Never Knew (I Could Love Anyone Like I'm Loving You)" (Raymond B. Egan, Roy Marsh, Tom Pitts) – 2:32
5. "Ain't Misbehavin'" (Harry Brooks, Andy Razaf, Fats Waller) – 3:25
6. "Evenin'" (Mitchell Parish, Harry White) – 4:14
7. "All by Myself" (Irving Berlin) – 2:34
8. "River, Stay 'Way from My Door" (Mort Dixon, Harry Woods) – 4:26
9. "You Can Depend on Me" (Charles Carpenter, Louis Dunlap, Earl Hines) – 3:33
10. "Am I Blue?" (Harry Akst, Grant Clarke) – 2:54
11. "Shine On, Harvest Moon" (Nora Bayes, Jack Norworth) – 2:10

== Personnel ==
- Jimmy Rushing – vocals
- Dave Brubeck – piano
- Paul Desmond – alto saxophone
- Gene Wright – double bass
- Joe Morello – drums
- Teo Macero – producer
