= Theodore Carpenter =

American jazz musician and bandleader (1898–1975)

- Also known as: "Wingie" or "Wingy" Carpenter
- Born: April 15, 1898; St. Louis, Missouri, U.S.
- Died: July 21, 1975 (aged 77); New York City, U.S.
- Genres: Jazz
- Occupation(s): Trumpet player, singer, bandleader
- Instrument: Trumpet
- Years active: c. 1920s–1960s
- Formerly of: Zack Whyte, Jesse Stone, Skeets Tolbert, and others

Theodore "Wingie" Carpenter (April 15, 1898 – July 21, 1975) was an American jazz trumpet player, singer, and band leader active from the 1920s through the 1960s.

== Bio ==
Carpenter lost his left arm as the result of an accident during his early teens, with the amputation performed by a noted surgeon who was an uncle of jazz musician Doc Cheatham. Sometime later, Carpenter took up the trumpet and by 1920 he was working in traveling carnival shows, and in 1921 he toured with Herbert's Minstrel Band. He was one of several one-armed trumpeters who worked in the music business, including similarly nicknamed Wingy Manone.

By 1926, he had settled in Cincinnati, Ohio, where he worked with Wes Helvey, Clarence Paige, Zack Whyte, and Speed Webb. In 1927, he played in Buffalo, New York, with Eugene Primus. Off and on from late 1926 through 1928, he was featured on the Whitman Sisters' Show with pianist Troy Snapp's band.

During the early 1930s, Carpenter was featured with Smiling Boy Steward's Celery City Serenaders and another Florida band led by Bill Lacey. In the mid-1930s, he began regular touring with bandleaders including Jack Ellis, Dick Bunch, and Jesse Stone. In the late 1930s, he settled in New York City, where he worked with Skeets Tolbert and Fitz Weston.

From 1939 on, Carpenter worked as the leader of his own band, working for periods at well-known clubs such as The Black Cat, The New Capitol, Tony Pastor's The Yeah Man, and other venues. He continued to lead his band through the 1960s, playing occasional dance dates. Several of his works are still accessible as MP3 downloads, including Look Out Papa Don't You Bend Down, Preachin' Trumpet Blues, Put Me Back in the Alley, Rhythm of The Dishes and Pans, and Team Up.

== Personal ==
Carpenter was born April 15, 1898, in St. Louis, Missouri, a son of Jefferson and Pollie (née Middleton) Carpenter; he died July 21, 1975, in New York City.
