= Roy Milton =

Native American singer, drummer and bandleader (1907–1983)

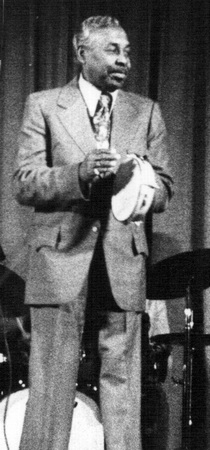
- Milton in 1977

Background information
- Born: Roy Bunny Milton; July 31, 1907; Wynnewood, Oklahoma, U.S.
- Died: September 18, 1983 (aged 76) Los Angeles, California
- Genres: Jump blues; R&B
- Occupation: Musician
- Instrument: Drums
- Years active: 1920s–1970s
- Labels: Specialty, Warwick, Kent, King, Black and Blue

Roy Bunny Milton (July 31, 1907 – September 18, 1983) was an American R&B and jump blues singer, drummer and bandleader.

== Career ==
Milton's grandmother was Chickasaw. He was born in Wynnewood, Oklahoma, and grew up on an Indian reservation before moving to Tulsa, Oklahoma. His mother, as "Janie Melton", is listed as a Chickasaw Freedmen on the Dawes Rolls, while his father as "Jeff Melton" is listed as a "now Non-citizen". He joined the Ernie Fields band in the late 1920s as singer and, later, drummer.

After moving to Los Angeles, in 1933, he formed his own band, the Solid Senders, with Camille Howard on piano. He performed in local clubs and began recording in the 1940s, his first release being "Milton's Boogie" on his own record label. His big break came in 1945, when his "R.M. Blues", on the new Juke Box label, became a hit, reaching number 2 on the Billboard R&B chart and number 20 on the pop chart. The disc sold in excess of one million copies. Its success helped establish Art Rupe's company, which he shortly afterwards renamed Specialty Records.

In 1950, Milton and his Orchestra performed at the sixth famed Cavalcade of Jazz concert held at Wrigley Field in Los Angeles which was produced by Leon Hefflin, Sr. on June 25. Also featured on the same day were Lionel Hampton & His Orchestra, Pee Wee Crayton's Orchestra, Dinah Washington, Tiny Davis & Her Hell Divers, and other artists. 16,000 were reported to be in attendance and the concert ended early because of a fracas in the crowd while Hampton's band played "Flying Home".

Milton and his band became a major touring attraction, and he continued to record successfully for Specialty Records through the late 1940s and early 1950s. He recorded a total of 19 Top Ten R&B hits, the biggest being "Hop, Skip and Jump" (number 3 R&B, 1948), "Information Blues" (number 2 R&B, 1950), and "Best Wishes" (number 2 R&B, 1951). He left Specialty in 1955. However, releases on other labels were unsuccessful, and with the emergence of rock and roll his style of music became unfashionable by the middle of the decade.

He continued to perform, appearing as a member of the Johnny Otis band at the Monterey Jazz Festival in 1970, and he resumed his recording career in the 1970s with albums for Kent Records (Roots of Rock, Vol. 1: The Great Roy Milton, Kent KST-554), and for the French label Black & Blue Records (Instant Groove, Black & Blue 33.114).

Milton died in Los Angeles on September 18, 1983, aged 76.

== The Solid Senders (band members) ==
- drums - Roy Milton
- piano - Camille Howard
- bass - Edward David Robinson, Clarence Jones (1947), Dallas Bartley (1947–50), Billy Hadnott (1951–52)
- guitar - Johnny George "Junior" Rogers (1947–53), James Davis (1954)
- alto saxophone - Earl Simms, Caughey Roberts, Clifton Noel (1947–48), John Kelson (AKA Jackie Kelso) (1948–52)
- tenor saxophone - Lorenzo "Buddy" Floyd, Bill Gaither (1947), Benny Waters (1948–50), Eddie Taylor (1950–52)
- trumpet - Hosea Sapp, Jimmy Nottingham, Aaron Arthur Walker (1948–50), Charles Gillum (1950–52)

== Discography ==
- Rock 'n' Roll Versus Rhythm and Blues (Dooto, 1959) split album with Chuck Higgins
- Roots of Rock, Vol. 1: The Great Roy Milton (Kent, 1971) produced by Johnny Otis
- R.M. Blues (Specialty, 1974)
- Roy Milton & His Solid Senders (Sonet, 1976)
- Great Rhythm & Blues Oldies, Volume 9: Roy Milton (Blues Spectrum, 1977) produced by Johnny Otis
- Instant Groove (Black & Blue, 1977; reissue: Classic Jazz, 1984)
- The Grandfather of R&B (Jukebox Lil, 1981)
- Big Fat Mama (Jukebox Lil, 1985)

== CD releases ==
- Roy Milton & His Solid Senders (Specialty 7008; Ace CHD 308)
- Groovy Blues: Roy Milton & His Solid Senders, Vol. 2 (Specialty 7024; Ace CHD 435)
- Blowin' With Roy: Roy Milton & His Solid Senders, Vol. 3 (Specialty 7060; Ace CHD 575) [these three volumes included material that Milton and his band recorded for the Specialty label between 1947 and 1953, plus the four earlier recordings he made for Juke Box Records in 1945]
- Dootone Rock 'n' Rhythm and Blues (Ace CHD 839) [a various artists label sampler/overview that included all of Milton's Dootone material]
- The Chronological Roy Milton 1945-1946 (Classics "Blues & Rhythm Series" 5041) [included Milton's four Hamp-Tone recordings, his four Juke Box recordings, and the numerous recordings he made for his own Roy Milton and Miltone labels before he signed with Specialty Records in 1947]
- Roy Milton's Miltone Records Story (Acrobat ADDCD 3016) [1946-1948 recordings from Milton's own independent labels: Roy Milton, Miltone, Ace, and Foto, featuring various vocalists/artists with backing by Milton and his bandmates (under the guise of 'The Blenders'); also included outside source material licensed from DeLuxe Records and distributed by Miltone]
