= Camille Howard =

American pianist and singer (1914–1993)

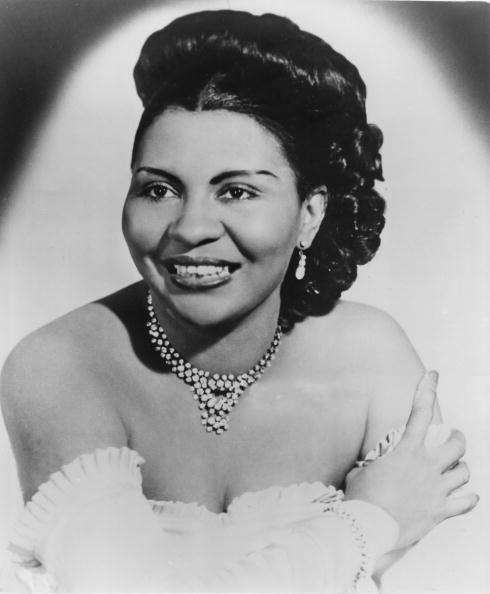
- Howard in 1948

Background information
- Also known as: Camille Agnes Browning; Camille Browning Howard
- Born: Deasy Browning; March 29, 1914; Galveston, Texas, United States
- Died: March 10, 1993 (aged 78) Los Angeles, California, United States
- Genres: R&B
- Occupations: Pianist, singer, songwriter
- Years active: Mid 1930s–late 1950s
- Formerly of: Roy Milton

Camille Howard (March 29, 1914 – March 10, 1993) was an American rhythm and blues pianist and singer, who first came to prominence in Roy Milton's Solid Senders in the 1940s. Her most successful recordings included "R. M. Blues" (as Milton's pianist, 1945), "Thrill Me" (as singer with Milton, 1947), and her own "X-Temporaneous Boogie" (1948).

== Life and career ==
She was born in Galveston, Texas, the daughter of Cecilia (née Hines) and Samuel Browning. Her birth was registered as Deasy Browning, but she grew up using the name Camille Agnes Browning. She learned piano and, during her teens, was a member of a local group, the Cotton Tavern Trio. By 1935 she was performing as a club musician in Galveston, as Camille Browning.

In the early 1940s, as Camille Howard, she moved from Texas to California. By 1943, she became a member of the Roy Milton Trio, who recorded for Lionel Hampton's Hamp-Tone label in 1945. Milton's group then expanded to become a six- or seven-piece band, the Solid Senders, and they were signed by Art Rupe's Juke Box label, which later became Specialty Records. Howard's piano featured on singer and drummer Milton's first hit, "R. M. Blues", recorded in December 1945, on which "she plays seemingly unending, florid melodies with her right hand." The record reached number 2 on the Billboard R&B chart, and number 20 on the pop chart, in early 1946.

The record was the first of many R&B hits for Milton on the Juke Box and Specialty labels. Following its success, Howard also made her first recordings under her own name for the small Pan-American label in 1946. She stayed with Milton's Solid Senders and was the featured piano player on all their hits through the late 1940s and early 1950s. She was the vocalist on their number 5 R&B hit in 1947, "Thrill Me".

After the success of "Thrill Me", Rupe began promoting her as a solo artist, and she had her first hit under her own name in 1948 with "X-Temporaneous Boogie", which reached number 7 on the R&B chart, and sold close to a quarter of a million copies. The track, a "roaring instrumental" in her characteristic "two-fisted thundering boogie style", was recorded with Milton and bassist Dallas Bartley, and was improvised at the end of her first recording session as leader, late on December 31, 1947; the following day, a ban on recordings imposed by the American Federation of Musicians came into effect.

She continued to play in Milton's band, and Milton was also a member of her Trio for recordings; they may have been married. Her own trio included Winston Williams (bass) and Walter Murden (drums), but she also performed occasionally with Milton, and toured with Jimmy Witherspoon, Little Willie Littlefield, Joe Liggins and others.

As well as continuing to record with Milton, Howard had 14 singles released under her own name by Specialty between 1948 and 1952, including both "storming boogies and sultry ballads". Her R&B chart hits included "You Don't Love Me" (1948), "Fiesta in Old Mexico" (1949), and "Money Blues (If You Ain't Got No Money, I Ain't Got No Use For You)" (1951). She also recorded with Witherspoon, Lillie Greenwood, and others.

In early 1953, Howard signed with Federal Records, and released several more singles, but with diminishing success in the face of the growth of rock and roll. She signed with Vee-Jay Records in 1956, and that year toured with Roy Brown, Little Willie John, The 5 Royales, and Joe Tex, but she had no more hits.

She retired from the music business shortly afterwards. She maintained strong religious convictions, and in later years was unwilling to talk about her career in secular music.

She died in Los Angeles in 1993, aged 78.

== Discography ==
- Camille Howard, Vol. 1: Rock Me Daddy (Specialty SPCD-7046, 1993)
- Camille Howard, Vol. 2: X-Temporaneous Boogie (Specialty SPCD-7062, 1996)
