= Oklahoma City Blue Devils =

American territory jazz band

- Origin: Oklahoma City, Oklahoma, USA
- Genres: Big band
- Years active: 1920s-1930s
- Past members: William "Count" Basie; Abe Bolar; Eddie Durham; Jo Jones; Oran "Hot Lips" Page; Walter Page; Jimmy Rushing; Henry "Buster" Smith; LeRoy V."Snake" White; Claude Williams; Lester Young

The Oklahoma City Blue Devils was the premier American Southwest territory jazz band in the 1920s. Originally called Billy King's Road Show, it disbanded in Oklahoma City in 1925 where Walter Page renamed it. The name Blue Devils came from the name of a gang of fence cutters operating during the early days of the American West.

They only released a single recording, in 1930, on Vocalion, with Squabblin' on the A side, and Blue Devil Blues on the B side.

Several prominent jazz musicians were members, including Lester Young, William "Count" Basie, Buster Smith and Hot Lips Page. The Blue Devils disbanded in 1933, after which Basie recruited most of the group's members to join his group, which had begun in 1931, but then changed the name to the Count Basie Orchestra.

The 1979 film The Last of the Blue Devils documents a musical reunion with Basie, Big Joe Turner and other figures from the history of southwestern and Kansas City jazz.

== Bibliography ==
- Daniels, Douglas Henry. One O'clock Jump: The Unforgettable History of the Oklahoma City Blue Devils. Boston: Beacon Press, 2006. ISBN 0-8070-7136-6
- Dinerstein, Joel. Swinging the Machine: Modernity, Technology, and African American Culture Between the World Wars . University of Massachusetts Press, 2003. ISBN 1-55849-383-2
- Hentoff, Nat. Listen to the Stories: Nat Hentoff on Jazz and Country Music. Da Capo, 2000. ISBN 0-306-80982-6
- Pearson, Nathan W. Goin' to Kansas City. Urbana: University of Illinois Press, 1987. ISBN 0-252-01336-0
- Russell, Ross. Bird Lives: The High Life and Hard Times of Charlie (Yardbird) Parker. Da Capo Press, 1996. ISBN 0-306-80679-7
- Russell, Ross. Jazz style in Kansas City and the Southwest. Berkeley: University of California Press, 1971. ISBN 0-520-01853-2
- Wishart, David J. (ed.) Encyclopedia of the Great Plains. University of Nebraska Press, 2004. ISBN 0-8032-4787-7
- Wolfgang, Otto. "The Early Days: How the Wild West Was Fenced In ", reprinted in The Cattleman (Texas and Southwestern Cattle Raisers Association), Aug. 1966, Vol. LIII, No. III.
