= Livin' the Blues (Jimmy Rushing album) =

Studio album by Jimmy Rushing
- Released: 1968
- Recorded: 1968
- Studio: Capitol Studios, New York, NY
- Genre: Blues, Jazz
- Length: 31:18
- Label: BluesWay; BL/BLS 6017
- Producer: Bob Thiele

Jimmy Rushing chronology
Every Day I Have the Blues (1967)	Livin' the Blues (1968)	Sent for You Yesterday (1969)

Livin' the Blues is an album by blues/jazz vocalist Jimmy Rushing released by the BluesWay label in 1968.

== Reception ==
Professional ratings
Review scores
Source	Rating
AllMusic	3/5 stars

AllMusic reviewer Dave Nathan stated: "Despite that this was one of the last recordings Rushing made before his death, he was still in the top of his form andcould shout the blues with the best of them".

== Track listing ==
1. "Sent for You Yesterday (Here You Come Today)" (Count Basie, Eddie Durham, Jimmy Rushing) – 4:10
2. "Bad Loser" (Connie Rushing, Rose Marie McCoy) – 4:18
3. "Sonny Boy Blues" (George David Weiss, George Douglas) – 4:43
4. "We Remember Prez" (Dickie Wells) – 4:55
5. "Cryin' Blues" (Weiss, Douglas) – 4:36
6. "Take Me Back Baby" (Basie, Tab Smith, Jimmy Rushing) – 6:10
7. "Tell Me I'm Not Too Late" (Connie Rushing, Rose Marie McCoy) – 7:37

== Personnel ==
- Jimmy Rushing – vocals
- Dickie Wells – trombone
- Buddy Tate – tenor saxophone
- Dave Frishberg – piano
- Hugh McCracken, Wally Richardson – guitar
- Bobby Bushnell – Fender bass
- Joe Marshall – drums
