= King Watzke =

American musician

Alex "King" Watzke (1872-1919) was a violinist and bandleader in New Orleans, Louisiana. His band enjoyed fair popularity ca. 1900-1911 or later. The band played ragtime, popular music, and possibly an early or ancestral version of what later became known as jazz. By 1904 Watzke's band's repertory included an early version of what later became known as "Tiger Rag" or a similar melody; he and his band called it "Number 2" as Watzke's practice was to refer to his compositions by number. As this appears to be the earliest dated reference to "Tiger Rag", many believe Watzke's claim to have been its composer.

Alexander Constantin Watzke, Junior ("King") was the youngest child of Alexander Constantin Watzke (Senior), a member of the Louisiana State Legislature, and a leader of New Orleans' German community, who died in 1914. He had several siblings. "King" Watzke was one of the first white bandleaders to take up ragtime and jazz, what had hitherto been primarily African-American musical genres, and thus was responsible for more widely popularizing these musical styles.

Watzke decided to bill himself as "King" after the example of Buddy Bolden. It was reported that he gave coins to children in New Orleans' French Quarter to announce his coming, "Here comes King Watzke". Refer to the article: Jazz Royalty

It is believed by some that Watzke and his band, "Alexander's Ragtime Band", were the real-life inspiration for Irving Berlin's 1911 song, "Alexander's Ragtime Band", and the 1938 movie of the same name, Alexander's Ragtime Band. Even though, for the motion picture, the name and city were changed, the basics of the story appear to ring true, according to family members, and New Orleans jazz history aficionados. The band has also been described as "King Watzke's Band" or "Dixieland Band" in the written accounts cited as references.

King Watzke and his band are referred to in a scholarly book by Daniel Hardie, about the history of New Orleans jazz. The following were reported to have been members of the band: Violin or Bass Viol - King Watzke (leader); Trumpet - Jimmy Kendall; Clarinet - Freddie Burns; String Bass - Buzz Harvey, Emile Bigard; Guitar - Jimmy Ruth, Pat Shields. Sometimes Larry Shields (clarinetist) and Ray Lopez (from about 1903–08) played with this band.

Because sound recordings were new in that era, no recordings of Watzke or his band are known to have survived. However, one unlabeled not commercially released "demo" or sample 78 rpm record was known to have been in the hands of surviving family; though it is believed forever lost due to a Gulf Coast hurricane. Also, no photos appear to have survived, even in his family, despite diligent searches.

His father, Alexander Constantin Watzke, Senior, was a successful businessman, in the hide and fur trade, who immigrated to New Orleans from Germany circa 1851; he had served one term in the Louisiana State Legislature and was a leader in the German community of New Orleans; he and his family resided in a large mansion, since demolished, on South Rampart Street. Many family members continue to live in Louisiana and elsewhere in USA, although Alex Jr. is not known to have married, nor left any direct descendants.

Although there had been some uncertainty or controversy about when he died, it has now been established that King Watzke died in 1919, in the Spanish flu pandemic. An obituary was published in The New York Times, and his inscription on the family tombstone in New Orleans suggests a date of death on January 14, 1919. There had been some confusion, however, as an obituary published in the New Orleans Times-Picayune referred to the death of another Alexander Watzke almost a decade later, on June 2, 1928, but that person has now been established to have been the nephew of "King" the jazz musician. Alex (King) Watzke is buried in the family grave in the St. Joseph Cemetery in New Orleans.

Jazz aficionados in New Orleans and elsewhere, and the Watzke family worldwide are commemorating the 100th anniversary of the death of King Watzke, the nearly forgotten jazz great of the early days of the genre, in January 2019.

== See also ==
- Jazz royalty
