= Skeets Tolbert =

American jazz musician (1909–2000)

Campbell Aurelius "Skeets" Tolbert (February 14, 1909, in Calhoun Falls, South Carolina – November 30, 2000, in Houston, Texas) was an American jazz clarinetist, alto saxophonist, vocalist, composer and bandleader. He acquired the nickname "Skeets", which was short for "Mosquito." Tolbert grew up in Lincolnton, North Carolina, and studied at Johnson C. Smith University. Though Tolbert never had a standard to his credit, he composed and arranged a great number of tunes that would become hits for others, notably Nat King Cole. He has 42 tracks over two albums to his credit as well and more that he has credit for in part. Red Richards who played piano and sang with Tolbert's Gentlemen of Swing said of Tolbert that he "could play" and was an original, that he didn't copy Louis Jordan. Of the band he said they were a strong, good sounding band. Of the music he said they were a "nice style band" that could play for dancing.

== Early career ==
He played in Dave Taylor's "Taylor's Dixieland Orchestra (Serenaders)" from 1929, with his first known recording in 1931, as a vocalist and on alto sax. In 1934 he moved to New York City, where he played with Charlie Alexander before joining the house band at the New York night club, the Savoy Ballroom. In 1936 he played with Fats Waller, primarily alto sax, this time was clearly highly influential on Tolberts own style of writing and arranging. He played in a band with athlete Jesse Owens in 1937. He next joined Snub Mosley's band and kept it going after Mosley left the group.

== Bandleader ==
Freddie Green, Kenny Clarke, Red Richards, Otis Hicks, Carl "Tatti" Smith, Lem Johnson, Buddy Johnson, Theodore Carpenter, Leonard Hawkins Harry Prather, Clarence Easter, all played with Tolbert in the band, which recorded in 1939 under the name Tolbert's Gentlemen of Swing. Babe Hines appeared on the Vol. 1 collection, Yack Taylor on the second; both were featured female vocalists. Tolbert made a point to have women sing solo blues ballads on at least a few songs on each album. He rarely used a single male lead and favored a call and response style leader/chorus. He used elements of vaudeville in many of his tunes, primarily minor blues, but some with darker lyrics. None of his songs ever charted or became standards but were intended for dancing in nightclubs and living rooms. Bold in his writing style, Tolbert was influenced by Fats Waller. In his tune, "Baby You're a Fine Piece of Meat," he used the line, "you got... the right size feet", a reference to Waller's "Your Feets Too Big." He also emulated Waller's style of writing odd tunes such as "The Stuff's Out," "Papa's in Bed with His Britches On," and others with silly lyrics. He recorded with this ensemble for three years for Decca Records, which at the time published Louis Jordan. His style evoked many eras of blues, vaudeville, and jazz fusion.

Tolbert played at the Famous Door in New York for $75/week. he also played aside the bar at the Queens Terrace in Astoria Queens, New York, the same club Jackie Gleason got started playing in when he broke into the music business. In a 1995 interview with Eddie Detmeyer, Red Richards noted that the band at the Queen's Terrace would frequently get called to play in the "big room" for bigger acts including Jackie Gleason because Tolbert knew the music. He could play the music of anyone from Louis Jordan to the emerging Nat King Cole, whose career he helped launch. Cole used Tolbert's number, "Hit that Jive Jack," and had huge success with it. Tolbert arranged and composed a number of tunes for Cole, Count Basie, Louis Jordan, all reaching more success than Tolbert ever did. Most of his gigs were "tough jobs" according to Richards because he was so good but always remained in the background, never gaining fame or enough money to live, which is why he left to pursue teaching.

Tolbert got into the film business with a series of shorts known as soundies. In 1944 the ensemble recorded four sound films of the tunes "No No Baby", "'Tis You Babe", "Blitzkrieg Bombardier", and "Corn Pone." All of those became soundies, with Lupe Cartiero singing the tune she wrote, "Corn Pone".

Tolbert used four dancers, likely from Fritz Pollard's Sun Tan Studios in Harlem. They may have been former members of The Zanzibeauts – dancers who performed at the Club Zanzibar who appear without credit in many soundies. The women also sang choruses to tunes on stage while Tolbert and band were in the orchestra pit.

== Later life ==
Tolbert completed studies at Columbia University in 1946 and broke up the group to take a job in Charlotte, North Carolina as a high school music teacher. He became a faculty member at Texas Southern University in Houston in 1948. Later in his life he worked for the American Federation of Musicians, Local 65-699 and owned Pied Piper Music store. Tolbert lived to be 91 years old.

== Discography ==
- 1931-40 - The Chronological and His Gentlemen of Rhythm (Classics,1997)
- 1940-42 - The Chronological and His Gentlemen of Rhythm (Classics,1998)
