= Alex Hill (musician) =

American jazz pianist (1906–1937)

William Alexander Hill
- Born: April 19, 1906; North Little Rock, Arkansas, United States
- Origin: Chicago, Illinois, United States
- Died: 1 February 1937 (aged 30) North Little Rock, Arkansas, United States
- Genres: Jazz
- Occupation: Pianist
- Instrument: Piano
- Years active: 1922–1937
- Label: Timeless Records

William Alexander "Alex" Hill (April 19, 1906 – February 1, 1937) was an American jazz pianist.

Hill was a child prodigy on piano, which he learned from his mother. While studying at Shorter College he met Alphonse Trent, and began arranging material for him. He graduated in 1922 and played in various territory bands, including Terrence Holder's. From 1924 to 1926 he led his own ensemble; later in 1926 he played with Speed Webb, and in 1927 he spent time with Mutt Carey's Jeffersonians and Paul Howard's Quality Serenaders.

Late in 1927 he relocated to Chicago, and held a job as an arranger for the Melrose Brothers Music Company, while simultaneously arranging for the Carroll Dickerson Orchestra. He played with Jimmy Wade in 1928, Jimmie Noone in 1929, and Sammy Stewart in 1930. In 1929, Hill plus the guitar players Dan Roberts and Alex Robinson, recorded for Paramount Records billed as the Hokum Boys. Later that year, Ikey Robinson recorded for OKeh Records, both with Jimmy Blythe and later with Hill. In addition, in the second half of 1929 this ensemble was joined by Leroy Carr and Scrapper Blackwell, issuing a small number of recordings billed as the Famous Hokum Boys.

While on tour with Stewart he moved to New York City. There he arranged for Paul Whiteman, Benny Carter, Claude Hopkins, Andy Kirk, Ina Ray Hutton, the Mills Blue Rhythm Orchestra, and Duke Ellington. He also did charts for Fats Waller, Eddie Condon, and Willie Bryant. Additionally, he became staff arranger for the Mills Music Company. He and Fats Waller did a show together in New York called Hello 1931, and accompanied Adelaide Hall. He recorded his own composition, "Passing Time With Me", with Art Gillham on Columbia Records on October 7, 1930.

Hill again put together his own group in 1935, but after playing at the Savoy Ballroom, he disbanded the ensemble due to his tuberculosis. He moved back to Little Rock, Arkansas, and died in 1937 at the age of 30.

Most of his recordings can be found on Alex Hill 1928-34, released on CD by Timeless Records in 1998. It includes recordings he made with Albert Wynn, Jimmy Wade, Jimmie Noone, Junie Cobb, Eddie Condon, and the Hokum Trio; in addition to 11 tunes he did as bandleader.
