= Every Day I Have the Blues (Jimmy Rushing album) =

1967 blues/jazz studio album

Studio album by Jimmy Rushing with Oliver Nelson and his orchestra featuring Dicky Wells
- Released: 1967
- Recorded: February 9 & 10, 1967
- Studio: Capitol Studios, New York, NY
- Genre: Blues, Jazz
- Length: 32:03
- Label: BluesWay; BL/BLS 6005
- Producer: Bob Thiele

Jimmy Rushing chronology
| Five Feet of Soul (1963) | Every Day I Have the Blues (1967) | Livin' the Blues (1968) |

Every Day I Have the Blues is an album by blues/jazz vocalist Jimmy Rushing with an orchestra arranged and conducted by Oliver Nelson released by the BluesWay label in 1967.

== Reception ==
Professional ratings
Review scores
| Source | Rating |
|---|---|
| AllMusic | 3/5 stars |

AllMusic reviewer Scott Yanow stated: "It may have been relatively late in Jimmy Rushing's career ... but he was still in prime singing voice. Joined by such friends as trombonist Dickie Wells, trumpeter Clark Terry, and tenor saxophonist Buddy Tate, Rushing shows that he was still relevant ... both Rushing and the musicians play off each other well, resulting in a swinging set".

== Track listing ==
1. "Berkeley Campus Blues" (Bob Thiele, George David Weiss) – 3:06
2. "Keep the Faith, Baby" (Shirley Scott, George Ismay, Rick Ward) – 2:48
3. "You Can't Run Around" (Count Basie, Jimmy Rushing) – 4:04
4. "Blues in the Dark" (Basie, Rushing) – 3:45
5. "Baby, Don't Tell on Me" (Basie, Rushing, Lester Young) – 2:44
6. "Every Day I Have the Blues" (Peter Chatman) – 2:52
7. "I Left My Baby" (Basie, Rushing, Andy Gibson) – 4:28
8. "Undecided Blues" (Rushing) – 5:18
9. "Evil Blues" (Basie, Rushing, Harry Edison) – 2:58

== Personnel ==
- Jimmy Rushing – vocals
- Clark Terry – trumpet
- Dickie Wells – trombone
- Bob Ashton – tenor saxophone
- Hank Jones – piano, organ (tracks (1–8)
- Shirley Scott – organ (track 9)
- Kenny Burrell – guitar (track 9)
- George Duvivier – bass
- Grady Tate – drums
- Other unidentified musicians
- Oliver Nelson – arranger, conductor
