= Mouse Randolph =

American jazz musician

Irving "Mouse" Randolph (January 22, 1909 – December 12, 1997) was an American swing jazz trumpeter.

Born in St. Louis, Missouri, United States, Randolph started off playing on riverboats with Fate Marable's ensemble. Following this he played in numerous territory bands, including those of Walt Farrington, Willie Austin, Art Sims, Norman Mason, Floyd Campbell, Alphonse Trent, and J. Frank Terry. From 1931 to 1933 he was in Kansas City, playing in Andy Kirk's Twelve Clouds of Joy, and then played briefly with Fletcher Henderson and Benny Carter in 1934. From 1935 to 1939, he played in Cab Calloway's orchestra. From 1939 to 1942, he was in the Ella Fitzgerald Orchestra under the direction of Chick Webb. In 1943, he played with Don Redman, and from 1944 to 1947 he did a stint with Edmond Hall.

Randolph continued to play into the 1970s, including with the Chick Morrison Orchestra. He never recorded as a bandleader, though he recorded copiously with Henderson, Carter, and Calloway. He died in New York City, at age 88.
