= Caughey Roberts =

American jazz musician (1912–1990)

Caughey Roberts (August 25, 1912 – December 15, 1990) was an American jazz alto sax player, best known for his time in the Count Basie Orchestra in the 1930s.

He was born in Boley, Oklahoma, later moving to Los Angeles. He played both baritone and alto sax, and clarinet. During the early-1930s, he was a music band teacher at Jefferson High School in Los Angeles. He later joined Buck Clayton’s 14-piece jazz ensemble (known as the Harlem Gentlemen). They traveled by cruise liner to Shanghai, China where they performed an extended engagement at the elegant Canidrome Ballroom. He would eventually leave Shanghai before the 1937 Second Sino-Japanese War. After returning from Shanghai, he replaced Buster Smith in the Count Basie Orchestra, leaving in 1942 when he was replaced by Earle Warren. He also played in Roy Milton's band. Caughey was drafted into the U.S. Army on August 13, 1942. He trained at Fort Huachuca for a week and a half. He requested to go with the band assigned at Fort Huachuca, but ended up with another band at Papago Park (Prisoner-of-War Camp) sixteen miles out of Phoenix, Arizona. He was there close to four years playing in the dance band and a small combo. He was honorably discharge from the U.S. Army with the rank of Sergeant, in February 1946. In later years he played in the traditional jazz band at Disneyland's New Orleans Square with Teddy Buckner and others.

He died in Los Angeles in 1990 at the age of 78.

== Discography ==
With Count Basie

- The Original American Decca Recordings (GRP, 1992)
