= George Hunt (trombonist) =

American jazz trombonist

- Born: c. 1906; Chicago, Illinois, U.S.
- Died: c. 1946 (aged 39–40) Chicago, Illinois, U.S.
- Genres: Jazz
- Instruments: Trombone

George Hunt (c. 1906 – c. 1946) was an American jazz trombonist with the Count Basie Orchestra in the late-1930s.

== Career ==
Born in Chicago, Hunt's career began in Bennie Moten's band in 1932. After Moten's death in 1935 he joined the Count Basie Orchestra, traveling to perform in New York City with them in 1936. He left the Basie band the following year, and joined Fletcher Henderson before leaving in 1938. He returned to Chicago, and later that year performed in the Earl Hines band. He also played with Artie Starck and Erskine Tate.

== Personal life ==
Hunt committed suicide in Chicago in about 1946.

== Discography ==
With Count Basie

- The Original American Decca Recordings (GRP, 1992)
