= Slats Long =

American jazz musician

- Birth name: Don Long
- Born: December 6, 1906; Wichita, KS
- Died: March 12, 1964 (aged 57); Wichita, KS
- Genres: Jazz
- Occupation: Musician
- Instruments: Clarinet

Don "Slats" Long (December 6, 1906 – March 12, 1964) was an American jazz clarinetist.

Long was born and raised in Wichita, Kansas, and he played in the late 1920s and early 1930s with Cass Hagan (1928), Ed Farley, and Mike Riley (1935). He then moved to New York City, where he played with Red Norvo (spring 1936), Chauncey Morehouse (spring 1938), Vincent Lopez (early 1937), and Bud Freeman (at Kelly’s Stable, New York, 1939). He worked in the early 1940s with Bobby Hackett (late 1940) Ted Lews, and Raymond Scott,

Long appears on recordings with several of these leaders and many others, including Red McKenzie (1935, 1937), Bunny Berigan (1936–7), Tommy Dorsey (1937) and Frank Froeba (1935).

He retired from music in 1943, moving back to Wichita and working for an aircraft manufacturer until his death in 1964.
