= Jazz royalty =

Term expressing adulation for Jazz musicians

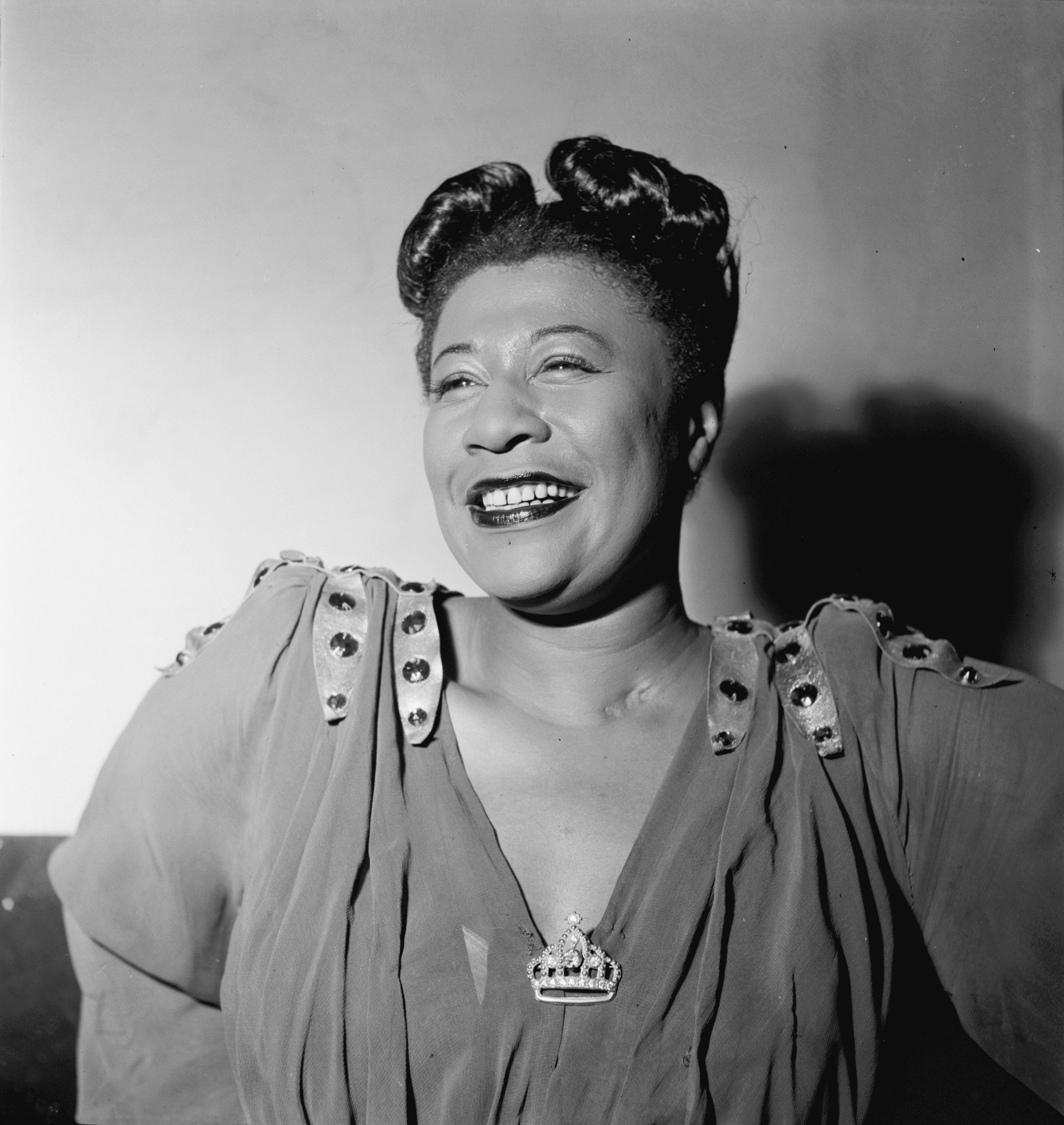
Jazz singer Ella Fitzgerald was nicknamed the "Queen of Jazz".

Jazz royalty includes the many jazz musicians informally granted honorific aristocratic or royal titles as nicknames to honor their musical talents. This practice goes back to New Orleans at the start of the 20th century, before the genre was commonly known as "jazz".

== History ==
In New York City in the 1920s, Paul Whiteman was billed as the "King of Jazz". His popular band with many hit records arguably played more jazz-influenced popular music than jazz per se, but to the dismay of many later jazz fans, Whiteman's self-conferred moniker stuck, and a film The King of Jazz starring Whiteman and his band appeared in 1930. The "King of Jazz" title was a publicity stunt in 1923 by an instrument manufacturer that Whiteman endorsed.

== Titles ==
=== King ===
- King Bolden: Buddy Bolden
- The King of Swing: Benny Goodman
- King Oliver (Joseph Nathan Oliver)
- Nat King Cole (Nathaniel Adams Coles)
- King Pleasure (Clarence Beeks)

=== Queen ===
- The Queen of Swing: Mildred Bailey
- The Queen of Jazz: Ella Fitzgerald
- The Empress of the Blues: Bessie Smith
- Malaysia's Queen of Jazz: Sheila Majid
- The Queen of Filipino Jazz: Katy de la Cruz

=== Other titles ===
- The Prince of Darkness: Miles Davis
- The Maharaja of the Keyboard: Oscar Peterson
- The Duke: Edward Kennedy "Duke" Ellington
- The Prince of Cool: Chet Baker
- The Jazz Baroness: Baroness Kathleen Annie Pannonica de Koenigswarter
- The Count: William James "Count" Basie
- Lady Day: Billie Holiday
- The Senator: Eugene Wright
- The Ambassador: Louis Armstrong
- Prez (The President): Lester Young

== See also ==
- The related tradition of Calypsonian nicknames
- List of honorific titles in popular music
- List of nicknames of jazz musicians
- Jazz Ambassadors
