= Hot Lips Page =

American jazz musician (1908–1954)

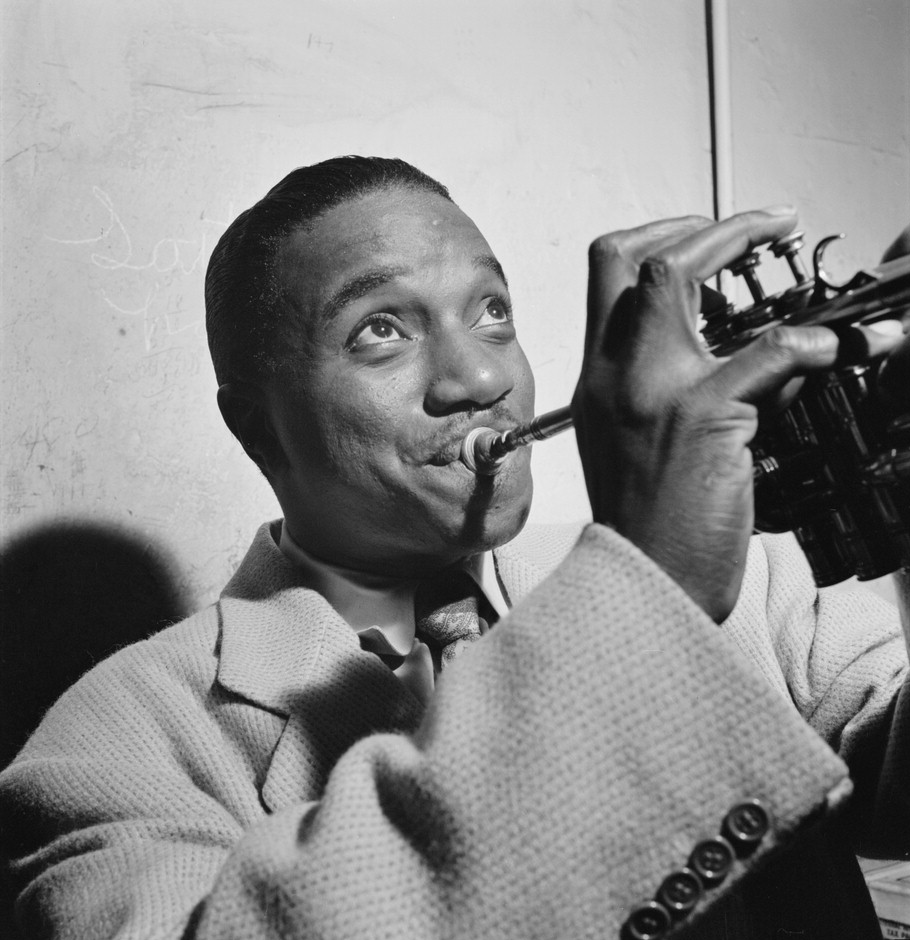
- Hot Lips Page, c. June 1946; Photo: William P. Gottlieb

Background information
- Also known as: Hot Lips Page, Lips Page
- Born: Oran Thaddeus Page; January 27, 1908; Dallas, Texas, U.S.
- Died: November 5, 1954 (aged 46) New York City, U.S.
- Genre: Jazz
- Occupations: Musician, bandleader
- Instruments: Trumpet, vocals

Oran Thaddeus "Hot Lips" Page (January 27, 1908 – November 5, 1954) was an American jazz trumpeter, singer, and bandleader. He was known as a scorching soloist and powerful vocalist.

Page was a member of Walter Page's Blue Devils, Artie Shaw's Orchestra and Count Basie's Orchestra, and he worked with Ma Rainey, Bessie Smith and Ida Cox. He was one of the five musicians booked for the opening night at Birdland with Charlie Parker in 1949.

== Life and career ==
Oran Thaddeus Page was born in Dallas, Texas, United States, to a schoolteacher and musician mother. He moved with his mother to Corsicana where he began attending Corsicana High School and later Texas College while also working at the oilfields. His earliest gigs were in circuses and minstrel shows while also backing such blues singers as Ma Rainey, Bessie Smith, and Ida Cox. Page's main trumpet influence was Louis Armstrong, though throughout his career he cited other local trumpeters, including Harry Smith (Kansas City) and Benno Kennedy (San Antonio) as being early influences.

In the mid-1920s, while still a teenager, Page is believed to have appeared with Troy Floyd and His Orchestra in San Antonio, Texas, and with Eddie and Sugar Lou, a dance band headquartered in Tyler, Texas, though no documentation has been unearthed to support his presence in either band. He also claimed to have appeared around 1925 with a band in Shreveport, Louisiana, known as Goog and His Jazz Babies and with a band in New Orleans known as French's Jazz Orchestra, though no documentation has been discovered.

In 1926, he caught the eye of the bassist Walter Page (no relation) who had recently assumed leadership of the Oklahoma City Blue Devils. It is believed that Oran Page joined the Blue Devils circa 1927, though no known documentation exists to support his presence with the band until the fall of 1928. He played and toured with the Blue Devils until early 1931, when he joined the Bennie Moten Orchestra, the leading dance band of Kansas City.

Though not a regular member of the band, Page appeared as a vocalist, emcee and hot trumpet soloist with Count Basie's Reno Club orchestra, after the Moten band finally disbanded upon that leader's sudden death in April 1935. Page embarked upon a solo career during this period, playing with small pick up bands from Kansas City, where he had moved in early 1931.

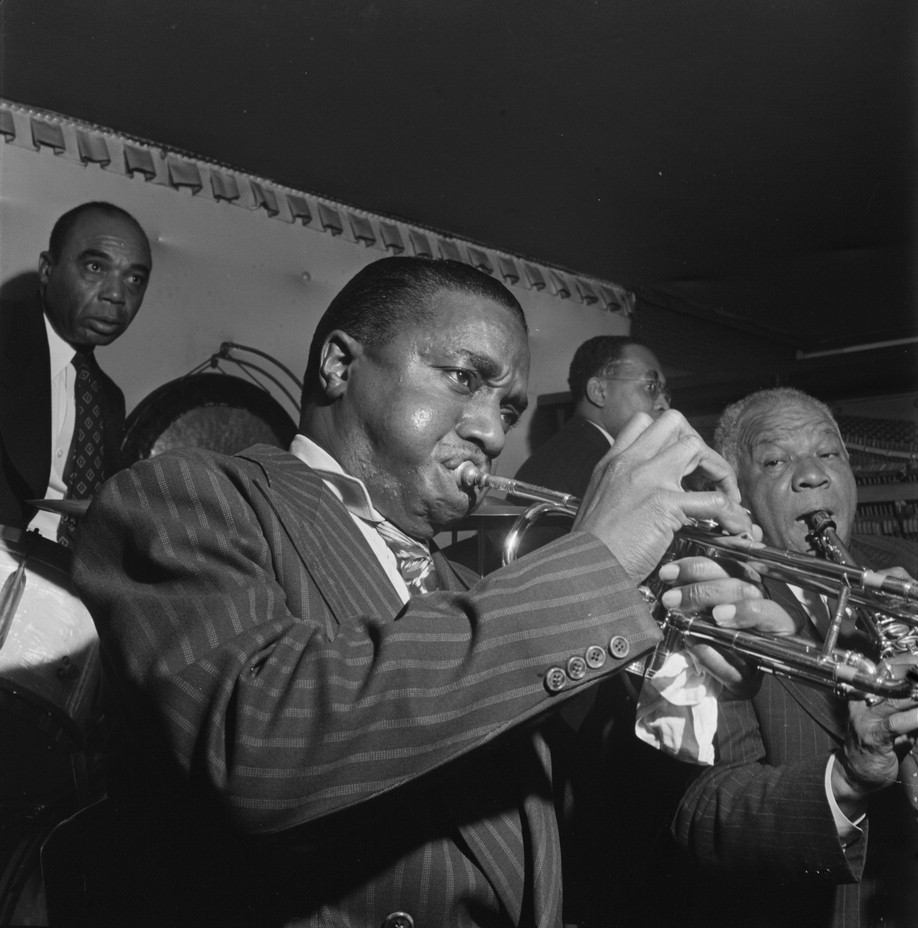
Hot Lips Page, Sidney Bechet, Freddie Moore, and Lloyd Phillips at Jimmy Ryan's(club, New York City in June 1947

The Reno Club, in downtown Kansas City, had a floor show, which included Page and vocalist Jimmy Rushing. Basie's band was just starting to build their reputation, but in the summer of 1936—on the eve of Basie's national success—and at the beckoning of Louis Armstrong's manager, Joe Glaser, Page decided to pursue a solo career. He moved to New York City in December 1936.

Page's career as a bandleader had an auspicious start, with sold-out appearances and an extended run at Harlem's Smalls Paradise in the summer of 1937, but by 1939 he was struggling to maintain a regular working band. Nonetheless, he led several bands and combos of his own, particularly on New York's 52nd Street, where he appeared from 1938 or 1939, and in many venues in Harlem. Page toured extensively throughout the southern United States, and throughout the northeast and Canada at the head of as many as 13 different big bands during the 1930s and 1940s. He appeared briefly with Bud Freeman's Orchestra in 1940, and a live recording of him with Freeman's 1940 big band recently surfaced on the Internet Archive, and Lips was a featured vocalist and hot soloist with Artie Shaw's Symphonic Swing Orchestra in 1941 and 1942, with whom he recorded more than 40 sides.

From 1929, he made over 200 recordings, most as a leader, for Bluebird, Vocalion, Decca and Harmony Records, among others. His band backed the singer Wynonie Harris on the session that produced the hit "Good Rocking Tonight", though Page was never credited as the leader. He was the leader of the house band at the Apollo Theater during the early 1940s. Page was known as "Mr. After Hours" to his many friends for his ability to take on challengers in late-night jam sessions, and he was recorded at Harlem's Minton's Playhouse in 1941 playing in a proto-bebop style. He recorded for the Mezzrow-Bechet Septet (on two consecutive dates in 1945, as Pappa Snow White, with Mezz Mezzrow, Sidney Bechet, Jimmy Blythe, Jr., Danny Barker, Pops Foster, and Sid Catlett, and on the second session with Cousin Joe on vocals.)

Page recorded duets with Pearl Bailey on "The Hucklebuck" and "Baby, It's Cold Outside" in 1949. He traveled to Europe in 1949 and appeared at Salle Pleyel in the first international jazz festival there, and returned to Europe at least twice for extended tours in the early 1950s.

He was one of the most flexible of trumpeters, demonstrating a broad tone and a wide range on the instrument. He is considered by many to be one of the founders of what came to be known as rhythm and blues.

Page died in New York in November 1954, aged 46.

== Discography ==
- 1938-40 – The Chronological Classics (1991)
- 1940-44 – The Chronological Classics (1995)
- 1944-46 – The Chronological Classics (1997)
- 1946-50 – The Chronological Classics (2001)
- 1950-53 – The Chronological Classics (2004)

== See also ==
- Kansas City Jazz
