= Claude Williams (musician) =

American jazz musician

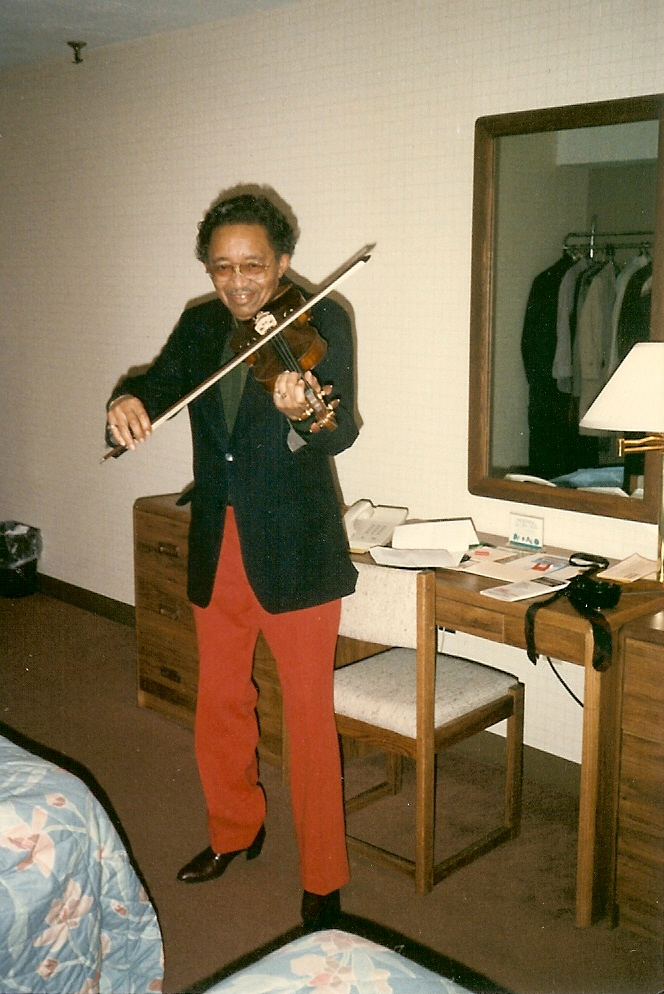

Background information
- Born: Claude Gabriel Williams; February 22, 1908; Muskogee, Oklahoma
- Died: April 25, 2004 (aged 96) Kansas City, Missouri
- Genres: Jazz
- Occupation: Musician
- Instruments: Violin, guitar, Mandolin, Bass
- Years active: 1927–2000
- Labels: SteepleChase, Arhoolie, Progressive, Black & Blue

Claude "Fiddler" Williams (February 22, 1908 – April 25, 2004) was an American jazz violinist and guitarist who recorded and performed into his 90s. He was the first guitarist to record with Count Basie and the first musician to be inducted into the Oklahoma Jazz Hall of Fame.

== Early life ==
Claude Gabriel Williams was born in Muskogee, Oklahoma on February 22, 1908, the son of Lee J. Williams, a blacksmith, and Laura Williams, home maker. He was the youngest of six children.

Talented from a young age, Williams could play multiple instruments in his brother-in-law's string band: banjo, cello, guitar, mandolin. Their early band played outside, in hotels, and at barbershops around their hometown of Muskogee, Oklahoma and on a circuit up through Oklahoma City. At the time he'd make six to seven dollars for a night of playing. He commented that at this time people would work the whole week for about five or six dollars. At a concert in Muskogee he heard Joe Venuti play, and this inspired Williams to start playing jazz violin.

== Career ==
He went to Kansas City, Missouri in 1927 and became part of the Twelve Clouds of Joy, led by trumpeter Terrence Holder and then Andy Kirk, with Mary Lou Williams on piano. He recorded with them for Brunswick Records the following year. After leaving Kirk, he played in Chicago in a band with Nat King Cole and his brother Eddie Cole and then became the first guitarist to record with Count Basie.

He spent most of his life in Kansas City. In the 1950s, he played with Eddie Vinson, Hank Jones, and another musician from Muskogee, pianist Jay McShann. For the next twenty years he led his own groups but did not record. Nearly thirty years since his last recording, he reunited with McShann in the 1970s to record McShann's album Man From Muskogee. Williams performed at Bill's Le Gourmet in Wichita, Kansas from 1972-1977.

He was inducted into the Oklahoma Jazz Hall of Fame in 1989. That year he performed in a tour called "Masters of the Folk Violin" and in the "Broadway Show Black and Blue." In the former, the finale featured a duet with Williams Krauss and Alison Krauss. At the time Alison was a 16-year-old country fiddler and singer.

In the 1990s, Williams performed at Carnegie Hall, Lincoln Center, and at the inauguration of President Bill Clinton. He was profiled on the TV program CBS News Sunday Morning and became the first person to be inducted into the Oklahoma Jazz Hall of Fame. He was a recipient of a 1998 National Heritage Fellowship awarded by the National Endowment for the Arts, which is the highest honor in the folk and traditional arts in the United States. His last album, Swingin' the Blues, was recorded in 2000. He was 96 when he died in 2004.

He was the last surviving jazz musician to have recorded before 1930. His memorabilia was donated to the University of Missouri–Kansas City.

== Discography ==
- Call for the Fiddler (SteepleChase, 1976)
- Kansas City Giants (Big Bear Records, 1980)
- Fiddler's Dream (Classic Jazz), 1981
- Live at J's, Pt. 1 (Arhoolie, 1989)
- Live at J's, Pt. 2 (Arhoolie, 1989)
- Swingtime in New York (Progressive, 1994)
- Jazz Violin & Guitar Duets (Global Village, 1995)
- King of Kansas City (Progressive, 1996)
- Swingin' the Blues (Bullseye Blues, 2000)
- My Silent Love (Black & Blue, 2002)

With Count Basie

- The Original American Decca Recordings (GRP, 1937–39 [1992])

With Jay McShann

- The Man from Muskogee (Sackville, 1980)

With Fessors Session Boys

- Feelin' Good (Storyville, 1981)
