= Terrence Holder =

American jazz musician (1897–1983)

Terrence Holder (January 17, 1897, Muskogee, Oklahoma, United States – September 1983, Muskogee, Oklahoma) was an American jazz trumpeter and territory band leader. He was also known as "Torrance Holder".

== Career ==
Beginning in the early 1920s, Holder worked with Alphonse Trent in Muskogee, Oklahoma and was a soloist at a Dallas performance in 1925. A year later he started the territory band the Dark Clouds of Joy, which included Don Byas, Andy Kirk, and Claude Williams. When Kirk led the band in 1929, the name was changed to Twelve Clouds of Joy or the Clouds of Joy. During the 1930s Holder worked in Kansas City with Budd Johnson and Buddy Tate.
