= Alphonse Trent =

American jazz pianist and territory band leader (1902–1959)

Alphonso Trent
- Also known as: Alphonso Trent
- Born: Alphonse Trent; October 24, 1902; Fort Smith, Arkansas, US
- Died: October 14, 1959 (aged 56) Fort Smith, Arkansas, U.S.
- Genres: Jazz
- Occupations: Musician, band leader
- Instrument: Piano

Alphonse "Alphonso" Trent (October 24, 1902 – October 14, 1959) was an American jazz pianist and territory band leader.

== Life and career ==
Trent was born in Fort Smith, Arkansas on October 24, 1902. He played piano from childhood and worked in local bands in Arkansas through his youth.

He led his first band in the mid-1920s, possibly as early as 1923. In 1924 he played with Eugene Cook's Synco Six, and then took over leadership of the band, which played until 1934, playing mostly in the American South and Midwest, as well as on steamboats. Despite success in New York around 1930, Trent chose not to work further on the East Coast.

He left music in the mid-1930s but returned with another band in 1938. His sidemen included Terrence Holder, Alex Hill, Stuff Smith, Snub Mosley, Charlie Christian, Sweets Edison, Mouse Randolph, and Peanuts Holland.

As leader, he recorded only eight sides: four in 1928, two in 1930, and two in 1933. He died in Fort Smith on October 14, 1959.

His small recorded legacy has made him a somewhat obscure figure today, but the sophistication of his arrangements and the precision with which they were executed inspired awe in contemporaries - one such, Budd Johnson (quoted by Gunther Schuller via The Jazz Review) stated:

"Let me tell you about Trent... They were gods back in the twenties, just like Basie was, only many years ahead of him... They worked nothing but the biggest and finest hotels in the South... They were years ahead of their time".

== Discographical note ==
1927-33 VV AA Richmond Rarities (Recorded In Richmond, Indiana 1927-33) (Jazz Oracle BDW80008, ?). Contains the complete Johson recorded legacy plus Alex Jackson, Zack White and Red Perkins' complete recordings.
