= Jimmy Rushing =

American blues and jazz singer (1901–1972)

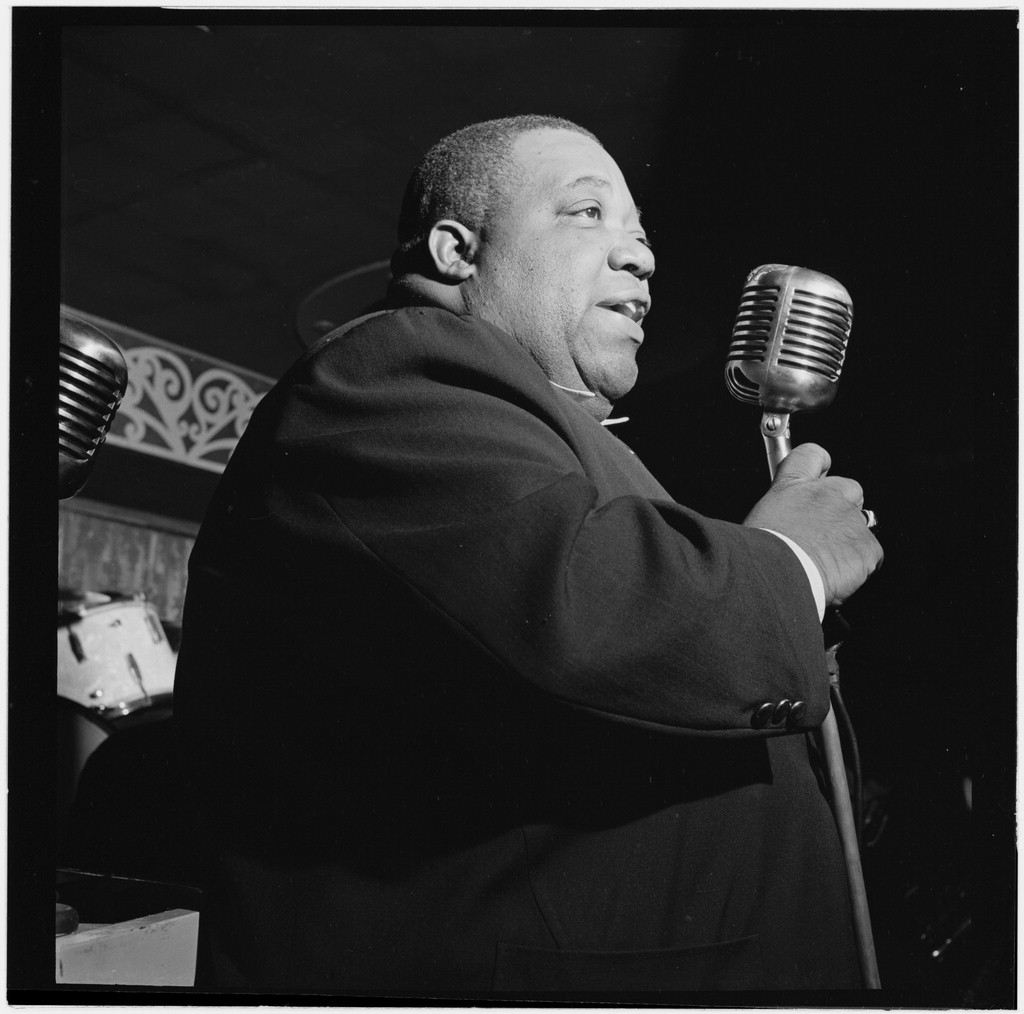
- Rushing at the New York Aquarium, 1946; by William P. Gottlieb

Background information
- Born: James Andrew Rushing; August 26, 1901; Oklahoma City, Oklahoma, U.S.
- Died: June 8, 1972 (aged 70) New York City, U.S.
- Genres: Jump blues; jazz
- Occupations: Musician; singer
- Instruments: Vocals; piano
- Years active: 1924–1972
- Formerly of: Jelly Roll Morton; Billy King; Walter Page's Blue Devils; Bennie Moten; Count Basie Orchestra; Humphrey Lyttelton; Dave Brubeck; Buck Clayton

James Andrew Rushing (August 26, 1901 – June 8, 1972) was an American singer and pianist from Oklahoma City, Oklahoma, U.S., best known as the featured vocalist of the Count Basie Orchestra from 1935 to 1948.

Rushing was known as "Mr. Five by Five" and was the subject of an eponymous 1942 popular song that was a hit for Harry James and others; the lyrics describe Rushing's rotund build: "he's five feet tall and he's five feet wide". He joined Walter Page's Blue Devils in 1927 and then joined Bennie Moten's band in 1929. He stayed with the successor Count Basie band when Moten died in 1935.

Rushing stated that his first time singing in front of an audience was in 1924. He was playing piano at a club when the featured singer, Carlyn Williams, invited him to do a vocal. "I got out there and broke it up. I was a singer from then on", he said.

Rushing was a powerful singer who had a range from baritone to tenor. He has sometimes been classified as a blues shouter. He could project his voice so that it soared over the horn and reed sections in a big-band setting. Basie claimed that Rushing "never had an equal" as a blues vocalist, though Rushing "really thought of himself as a ballad singer." George Frazier, the author of Harvard Blues, called Rushing's voice "a magnificent gargle". Dave Brubeck defined Rushing's status among blues singers as "the daddy of them all." Late in his life, Rushing said of his singing style, "I don't know what kind of blues singer you'd call me. I just sing 'em." Among his best-known recordings are "Going to Chicago", with Basie, and "Harvard Blues", with a saxophone solo by Don Byas.

== Early life and education ==
Rushing was born into a family with musical talent and accomplishments. His father, Andrew Rushing, was a trumpeter, and his mother, Cora, and her brother were singers. He studied music theory with Zelia N. Breaux at Frederick A. Douglass High School in Oklahoma City and was unusual among his musical contemporaries for having attended college at Wilberforce University.

Rushing's father encouraged him to play violin: "He had bought me a violin, and he had forbidden me to touch the piano." But when his father "left the house, he'd lock the piano and give my mother the key. We'd watch him go away, and then she'd give me the key."

Rushing was inspired to pursue music and sing blues by his uncle Wesley Manning and George "Fathead" Thomas of McKinney's Cotton Pickers.

== Career ==
Rushing toured the Midwest and California as an itinerant blues singer in the early 1920s before moving to Los Angeles, where he played piano and sang with Jelly Roll Morton. He also sang with Billy King before moving on to Walter Page's Blue Devils in 1927. He and other members of the Blue Devils defected to the Bennie Moten band in 1929.

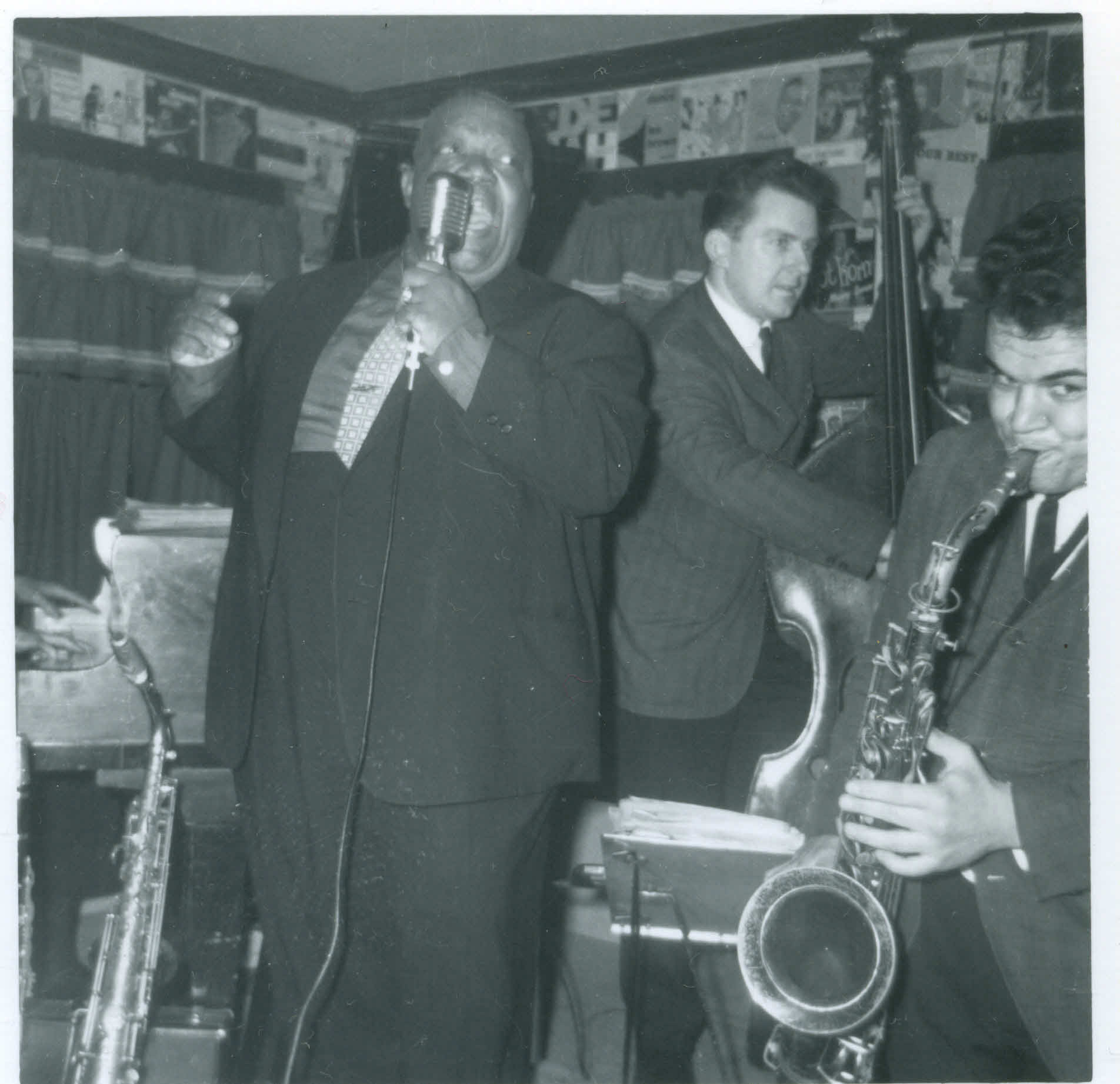
Rushing with the Woody Herman band at Lennie's on the Turnpike, 1964. From left: Rushing, Chuck Andrus, and Sal Nistico.

Moten died in 1935, and Rushing joined Count Basie for what would be a 13-year job. Due to his tutelage under his mentor Moten, Rushing was a proponent of the Kansas City, Missouri, jump blues tradition exemplified by his performances of "Sent for You Yesterday" and "Boogie Woogie" for the Count Basie Orchestra. After leaving Basie, his recording career continued as a singer with other bands.

When the Basie band broke up in 1950, he retired briefly but then formed his own group. He made a guest appearance with Duke Ellington for the 1959 album Jazz Party. In 1960, he recorded an album with the Dave Brubeck Quartet.

He appeared in the 1957 television special Sound of Jazz, singing one of his signature songs, "I Left My Baby", backed by many of his former Basie band members. In 1958, he was among the musicians included in an Esquire magazine photo by Art Kane that was memorialized in the documentary film A Great Day in Harlem. He toured the UK with Humphrey Lyttelton and his band. A BBC broadcast with Rushing accompanied by Lyttelton's big band was released in 2009. In 1960, he appeared in a videotaped blues jam at the Newport Jazz Festival with the Muddy Waters Blues Band, singing "Mean Mistreater". In 1969, Rushing appeared in The Learning Tree, the first major studio feature film directed by an African-American, Gordon Parks.

== Death ==
Rushing died of leukemia on June 8, 1972, at Flower Fifth Avenue Hospital in New York City, and was buried at the Maple Grove Cemetery in Kew Gardens, Queens, New York.

Until weeks before his death, he was singing on weekends at the Half Note Club in Manhattan.

== Personal life ==
Rushing was married twice. He had two sons, Robert and William, with his second wife, Cornelia (usually known as Connie), to whom he was married from the 1940s until his death. Connie Rushing is credited with two compositions on his 1968 solo album Livin' the Blues.

He lived in Jamaica, Queens.

== Critical assessment ==
Rushing was held in high critical esteem during his career and after his death. Whitney Balliett, jazz critic for The New Yorker, wrote of Rushing that "His supple, rich voice and his elegant accent have the curious effect of making the typical roughhouse blues lyric seem like a song by Noël Coward". The critic Nat Hentoff, who ranked Rushing as one of the "greatest blues singers", credited him as a seminal influence in the development of post–World War II popular black music. Hentoff wrote that rhythm and blues "has its roots in the blues shouting of Jimmy Rushing ... and in the equally stentorian delivery of Joe Turner". Scott Yanow described Rushing as the "perfect big band singer" who "was famous for his ability to sing blues, but in reality he could sing almost anything." In an essay about his fellow Oklahoman, the writer Ralph Ellison wrote that it was "when Jimmy's voice began to soar with the spirit of the blues that the dancers – and the musicians – achieve that feeling of communion which was true meaning of the public jazz dance." Ellison said Rushing began as a singer of ballads, "bringing to them a sincerity and a feeling for dramatizing the lyrics in the musical phrase which charged the banal lines with the mysterious potentiality of meaning which haunts the blues." In contrast with Rushing's reputation, he "seldom comes across as a blues 'shouter,' but maintains the lyricism which has always been his way with the blues," wrote Ellison. According to Gary Giddins, Rushing "brought operatic fervor to the blues", and of his time with Count Basie notes that "just about every record they made together is a classic."

He was a four-time winner of Best Male Singer in the Critics' Poll of Melody Maker and a four-time winner of Best Male Singer in the International Critics' Poll in DownBeat. His 1971 album The You and Me That Used to Be was named Jazz Album of the Year by DownBeat, and he received the 1971 Grammy nomination Best Jazz Performance by a Soloist.

Rushing was one of eight jazz and blues legends honored in a set of United States Postal Service stamps issued in 1994.

He was a 2024 inductee to the Blues Foundation's Blues Hall of Fame.

== Discography ==
- 1954: Goin' to Chicago (Vanguard, 1955)
- 1955: Sings the Blues (Vanguard, 1955)
- 1955: Listen to the Blues with Jimmy Rushing (Jazztone, 1956)
- 1956: Cat Meets Chick (Philips, 1956) with Ada Moore and Buck Clayton
- 1956: The Jazz Odyssey of James Rushing Esq. (Columbia, 1957) with Buck Clayton
- 1957: If This Ain't the Blues (Vanguard, 1958)
- 1958: Little Jimmy Rushing and the Big Brass (Columbia, 1958)
- 1959: Rushing Lullabies (Columbia, 1959)
- 1960: Bessie – Clara – Mamie & Trixie (The Songs They Made Famous) (Columbia, 1961)
- 1963: Five Feet of Soul (Colpix, 1963)
- 1962–66: Mr. Five By Flve "Live" (Montage)
- 1964: Big Boy Blues (Grand Prix Series, 1964) with Al Hibbler
- 1965–70: The Scene: Live in New York (HighNote, 2009) with Al Cohn and Zoot Sims
- 1967: Gee Baby Ain't I Been Good to You (Master Jazz, 1971)
- 1967: Who Was It Sang That Song? (Master Jazz, 1967)
- 1967: Every Day I Have the Blues (BluesWay, 1967) – arrangements by Oliver Nelson
- 1968: Livin' the Blues (BluesWay, 1968)
- 1971: The You and Me That Used to Be (RCA, 1971)

=== As guest ===
Early 78 RPM recordings

- 1930–1932: with Bennie Moten
- 1936, 1939: with Benny Goodman

With the Count Basie Orchestra

- 1937–39: The Original American Decca Recordings (3-CD box set) (Decca/GRP, 1992)
- 1936–41: The Complete Count Basie, Volumes 1–10 (CBS)
- 1937–44: At Savoy Ballroom 1937–1944 (Jazz Line, 1972)
- 1944: 1944 (Hindsight, 1986)
- 1957: Count Basie at Newport (Verve, 1957)
- 1959: The Newport Years, Volume VI (Verve, 1973)

With others

- 1960: Dave Brubeck, Brubeck and Rushing (Columbia, 1960)
- 1959: Buck Clayton, Copenhagen Concert (SteepleChase, 1979)
- 1959: Duke Ellington, Jazz Party (Columbia, 1959)
- 1959: Benny Goodman, Benny in Brussels (Columbia, 1958)
- 1961: Jimmy Witherspoon, Jimmy & Jimmy (Vogue, 1987)
- 1967: Earl Hines, Blues and Things (Master Jazz, 1968) – Rushing was in 4 titles with the Earl Hines quartet in 1967
- 1959: Various artists, The Sound of Jazz (Columbia, 1959)
