= Walter Page =

American jazz musician and bandleader (1900–1957)

- Born: Walter Sylvester Page; February 9, 1900; Gallatin, Missouri, U.S.
- Died: December 20, 1957 (aged 57) New York, New York, U.S.
- Genres: Jazz, swing, Kansas City jazz
- Occupations: Musician, bandleader
- Instruments: Double bass, tuba, baritone saxophone
- Formerly of: Oklahoma City Blue Devils

Walter Sylvester Page (February 9, 1900 – December 20, 1957) was an American jazz multi-instrumentalist and bandleader, best known for his groundbreaking work as a double bass player with Walter Page's Blue Devils and the Count Basie Orchestra.

== Early life ==
Page was born in Gallatin, Missouri, on February 9, 1900, to parents Edward and Blanche Page. Page showed a love for music even as a child, perhaps due in part to the influence of his aunt Lillie, a music teacher. Page's mother, with whom he moved to Kansas City in 1910, exposed him to folksongs and spirituals, a critical foundation for developing his love of music. He gained his first musical experience as a bass drum and bass horn player in the brass bands of his neighborhood. Under the direction of Major N. Clark Smith, a retired military bandleader who provided Page his first formal training in music, Page took up the string bass in his time at Lincoln High School. In an interview in The Jazz Review, Page remembers Major Smith:

Major N. Clark Smith was my teacher in high school. He taught almost everybody in Kansas City. He was a chubby little cat, bald, one of the old military men. He wore glasses on his nose and came from Cuba around 1912 or 1914. He knew all the instruments and couldn’t play anything himself, but he could teach. ... One day he was looking for a bass player and no one was around, so he looked at me, and said, "Pagey, get the bass." I said, "But," and he repeated, "Get the bass." That's when I got started.

In addition to the influence of Smith, Walter Page also drew inspiration from bassist Wellman Braud, whom Page had the opportunity to see when he came to town with a band under the direction of John Wycliffe. "I was sitting right in the front row of the high school auditorium", recalled Page, "and all I could hear was the oomp, oomp, oomp of that bass, and I said, that's for me." What attracted Page to Braud was Braud's intensity. "When Braud got ahold of that bass, he hit those tones like hammers and made them jump right out of the box."

== Career ==
After Page had completed high school, he went on to study to become a music teacher at the University of Kansas at Lawrence. At college, Page completed a three-year course in music in one year, in addition to taking a three-year course on gas engines. Between the years 1918 and 1923, he moonlighted as a tuba, bass saxophone, and string bass player with the Bennie Moten Orchestra. "Fridays and Sundays I played with Bennie Moten and Saturdays with Dave Lewis who was paying me $7.00 a night. Bennie was paying for my food and transportation, so when I'd be finished a weekend [sic] I'd made me $20.00 and had a ball."

In 1923, Page left the Moten band and began an engagement with Billy King's Road Show, touring the Theater Owners' Booking Association (TOBA) circuit across the United States. The band included Page's future Basie bandmates Jimmy Rushing and Count Basie himself.

The band soon fell apart, however, which led to the formation of Walter Page and the Blue Devils in 1925. The Blue Devils were a territory band based out of the Oklahoma City-Wichita, Kansas area. Throughout various times in its six-year lifespan (1925-1931) the band featured such noteworthy figures as Basie, Rushing, Buster Smith, Lester Young, and Hot Lips Page. In his autobiography, Basie recalls the first time he ever saw the Blue Devils Play:

The leader was the heavyset, pleasant-looking fellow playing the bass and doubling on the baritone. His name was Walter Page, and at that time the band was known as Walter Page and his Blue Devils. But you could also hear the musicians addressing him by his nickname, which was Big 'Un. You could also tell right away that they didn't just respect him because he was the boss; they really liked him and felt close to him because he was also one of them."

Page wanted badly to have his band square off against Moten's band, which he states in an interview never happened. Gunther Schuller gives a different account though, writing that "an encounter finally did take place in 1928, and on that occasion Page is reputed to have 'wiped out' the Moten band." What is indisputable, however, is that Moten did seem to shy away from competition with the Blue Devils, opting to buy off individual members with higher salaries and absorb them into his own group rather than do battle directly. Basie and Eddie Durham defected in 1929, followed shortly by Rushing and eventually by Page himself. Despite this seemingly underhanded tactic, Page still felt that "[Moten] had one of the biggest hearts I knew of." Page attempted to keep his Blue Devils intact, but after the departure of such key members of his band, the difficulties mounted. Unable to find suitable replacements, facing booking problems, and dealing with a musicians' union conflict, Page eventually ceded control of the band to James Simpson. He then proceeded to join Moten's band himself in 1931, staying on until 1934. Count Basie describes the immediate effect Walter Page had upon joining the Moten Band: "Big 'Un in there on bass made things a lot different in the rhythm section, and naturally that changed the whole band and made it even more like the Blue Devils."

In an interview published shortly before his death, Page recalls an encounter with Duke Ellington in 1934:

I remember Duke coming through on his way West that year. They were playing the Main Street Theatre and some of the boys in Duke's band wanted to go hear Basie. [Wellman] Braud was in the band and he acted biggety, didn't want to go, said, "What's he got?" We were playing at the Sunset Club and finally Duke and the rest crept around the scrim and started sitting in. I was playing right on top of Duke and he told Basie he was going to steal me out of the band. Basie told him I owed him $300.00 and that's how I didn't get to join Duke during all those good years he had. It was the smartest move Basie ever made.

After his second stint with the Moten band, Page moved to St. Louis to play with the Jeter-Pillars band. Following the death of Moten in 1935, however, Basie took over the former Moten Band, which Page rejoined. Page stayed with the Count Basie Orchestra from 1935 to 1942, an integral part of what came to be called the "All-American Rhythm Section. Together with drummer Jo Jones, guitarist Freddie Green, and pianist Basie, the rhythm section pioneered the "Basie Sound", a style in which Page, as bass player, clearly established the beat, allowing his bandmates to provide accompaniment more freely. Until this point, the rhythm of a jazz band was traditionally felt in the pianist's left hand and the kick of the bass drum on all four beats.

After his first departure from the Count Basie Orchestra, Page worked with various small groups around Kansas City. He returned to the Basie Band in 1946 for three more years. "Big 'Un just decided that he was ready to come back", recalled Basie. After his second stint with Basie, Page worked primarily as a freelancer until his life was cut short in 1957. The artists he worked with in the later portion of his career included former bandmate and trumpeter Page, Jimmy McPartland, Eddie Condon, Ruby Braff, Roy Eldridge, Vic Dickenson, Buck Clayton, Rushing, and others, including many Basie alumni.

== Death ==
The death of Walter Page on December 20, 1957, was very much a surprise, as the bassist had been playing gigs around New York City right up until his death. It is reported that Page contracted pneumonia on his way to a recording session in the midst of a snowstorm. An obituary in Jet magazine from January 9, 1958, under the “Died” column, reads: "Walter Page, 57, one of the greatest jazz bass players, who helped Count Basie lead an invasion of Kansas City jazz to New York in 1935; of kidney ailment and pneumonia; at Bellevue Hospital in New York City." It is speculated that Walter Page's early death may be a factor contributing to his relative obscurity in the history of jazz, despite his major influence and stylistic contributions. In an interview published only a month before his death in The Jazz Review, Walter Page expressed how he never sought praise and that he just wanted to know that he was appreciated for his influence on music.

== Style and influence ==
More than any other jazz bass player in history, Page is credited with developing and popularizing the "walking bass" style of playing on all four beats, a transition from the older, two-beat style. "He started that 'strolling' or 'walking' bass", recalls Harry "Sweets" Edison, "going way up and then coming right on down. He did it on four strings, but other bass players couldn't get that high so they started making a five-string bass." Page himself acknowledged the influence of Wellman Braud, who may have been the first bassist to actually record the "walking bass" technique on Washington Wobble. While it remains unclear who, exactly, was the true 'originator' of the walking bass style, Page is nonetheless accepted as one of, if not the primary, proponent of the style.

Page is seen as the "logical extension of [bassist] Pops Foster", an influential bassist known for his dependable timekeeping. Page is also recognized as "one of the first bassists to play four beats to the bar", in contrast to the two-beat style of New Orleans jazz. Bandmate Eddie Durham recalls how Page helped make the double bass a viable alternative to bass horns, such as the tuba: "Without amplification, a lot of guys weren't strong enough on bass fiddle. But Walter Page you could hear!" Page's imposing stature led Durham to state that "he was like a house with a note." Jazz critic Gunther Schuller notes describes some of Page's other stylistic contributions: "For the bass functions simultaneously on several levels: as a rhythm instrument; as a pitch instrument delineating the harmonic progression; and, since the days of Walter Page, as a melodic or contrapuntal instrument." Page was also famous for his restraint, a lesson fellow bassist Gene Ramey recounts: "There's a whole lot [you] could do here... but what you must do is play a straight line, because that man out there's waiting for food from you. You could run chord changes on every chord that's going on. You've got time to do it. But if you do, you're interfering with that guy [the soloist]. So run a straight line."

Although he was not well known as a soloist, Walter Page recorded one of the earliest jazz solos on the double bass on "Pagin' the Devil" with the Kansas City Six. He did, however, contribute to the legitimacy of the double bass as a melodic instrument, "open[ing] the door for virtuosos like [Duke Ellington Orchestra bassist] Jimmy Blanton to garner more respect for the instrument", through improvisation. "Without Page setting the table", writes DiCaire, "the exploits of Blanton would never have happened." "I'm not just a bass player", Page once said, "I'm a musician with a foundation."

Page had a complex understanding of the roles of all the instruments in his bands, due in no small part to the fact that he was a multi-instrumentalist himself. In fact, on Blue Devil Blues, one of only two recordings of Walter Page's Blue Devils, Page begins on tuba before switching to string bass and finally baritone saxophone, playing all three "astoundingly well". Drummer Jo Jones recalled an instance when "somebody was fooling around [in the band], Mr. Walter Page left his bass, went down quiet as a cat, got the baritone, played the sax parts, and went back to his place."

Page is perhaps best known for his work with the Count Basie Orchestra from 1935 to 1942. Page, drummer Jo Jones, guitarist Freddie Green, and pianist Count Basie became known as the "All-American Rhythm Section" and set the standard for jazz rhythm sections that is still emulated and considered the gold-standard today. Together, the four musicians "created the bedrock for the band to pile on a superstructure of exciting riffs" writes Shipton. Page's playing was a great influence on Jo Jones, who "says that it was Page who really taught him to play in Kansas City: 'An even 4/4'." Indeed, Berliner notes that "During the swing period, Walter Page's largely stepwise walking bass accompaniment in Count Basie's band epitomized the changing emphasis on the four-beat approach to meter described by Foster." "As part of the pianist's outstanding rhythm section", says Richard Cook, "Page's rock-solid time and unflustered swing was a key part of the four-way conversation." Jo Jones describes the dynamic of the rhythm section as a process and a group endeavor: "We worked at it, to build a rhythm section, every day, every night. We worked alone, not with the band all the time. I didn't care what happened—one of us would be up to par. If three were down, one would carry the three. Never four were out." "At its best, the Basie rhythm section was nothing less than a Cadillac with the force of a Mack truck. They more or less gave you a push, or a ride, and they played no favorites, whether you were an E-flat or B-flat soloist."

== Discography ==
As leader of the Oklahoma City Blue Devils

- Squabblin' and Blue Devil Blues (Vocalion, 1930)

With Count Basie

- The Original American Decca Recordings (GRP, 1937-39 [1992])

With Buck Clayton

- The Huckle-Buck and Robbins' Nest (Columbia, 1954)
- How Hi the Fi (Columbia, 1954)
- Jumpin' at the Woodside (Columbia, 1955)
- All the Cats Join In (Columbia 1956)

With Lester Young and Buck Clayton

- The "Kansas City" Sessions (Commodore, 1938 [1997])

With Paul Quinichette

- For Basie (Prestige, 1957)

With Lester Young, Charlie Christian and Buck Clayton

- From Spirituals to Swing (Vanguard, 1938 - 1939 [1999])

With Ruby Braff

- The Ruby Braff Octet with Pee Wee Russell & Bobby Henderson at Newport (Verve, 1957)

== See also ==
- Kansas City Jazz
- Count Basie Orchestra
- Oklahoma City Blue Devils
