= Charley (name) =

Charley is an English unisex given name and a surname. As an English given name, it is a diminutive form of Charles and a feminine form of Charlie. Notable people known by this name include the following:

== Given name ==
- Charley Armey (born 1939), American football coach, scout, and executive
- Charley Aull (1869–1958), American gridiron football player
- Charley Aylett (1913–1966), Australian politician
- Charley Barden (1874–1962), British cyclist
- Charley Barnes (born 1939), American gridiron football player
- Charley Barrett (1893–1924), American gridiron football player
- Charley Bassett (1863–1942), American baseball player
- Charley Belanger (1901–1970), Canadian boxer
- Charley Booker (1925–1989), American singer and guitarist
- Charley Boorman (born 1966), English TV presenter, travel writer and actor
- Charley Borah (1905–1980), American sprint athlete
- Charley Boswell (1916–1995), American gridiron football player and blind golf player
- Charley Bowser (1898–1989), American football coach
- Charley Brewer (fullback) (1873–1958), American gridiron football player
- Charles Brewer (American football), American gridiron football player
- Charley Britt (born 1938), American gridiron football player
- Charley Brock (1916–1987), American gridiron football player
- Charley Bryan, nickname of Charles S. Bryan (born 1942), American infectious disease physician, researcher, and author
- Charley Burley (1917–1992), African American boxer
- Charley Casserly (born c. 1949), American gridiron football sportscaster and executive
- Charley Chase (1893–1940), American comedian, screenwriter and film director
- Charley Cobb, American football coach
- Charlie Conerly (1921–1996), American gridiron football quarterback
- Charley Cowan (1938–1998), American gridiron football player
- Charley Crockett (born 1984), Americana singer, guitarist, and songwriter
- Charley Czarnecki, nickname of Walter Czarnecki (1916–1996), American basketball player
- Charley Dewberry, American ichthyologist and author
- Charley Diamond (1936–2020), American gridiron football player
- Charley L. Diaz (born 1959), United States Coast Guard captain
- Charley Dickens, nickname of Charles Dickens Jr., son of Charles Dickens
- Charley Donnelly (1885–1967), American educator, golfer, and college football and golf coach
- Charley Drayton (born 1965), American multi-instrumental musician and producer
- Charley Eckman (1921–1995), American basketball coach, referee, broadcaster, and author and baseball player
- Charley Edge (born 1997), Welsh footballer
- Charley Ellis (1944–2018), American boxer
- Charley Ewart (1915–1990), American gridiron football player
- Charley Ferrer (born 1963), Puerto Rican Doctor of Human Sexuality
- Charley Feeney (1924–2014), American sportswriter
- Charley Ferguson (1939–2023), American gridiron football player
- Charley Roussel Fomen (born 1989), Cameroonian footballer
- Charley Ford, nickname of Charles Ford (outlaw) (1857–1884), American outlaw, James Gang member, and brother of Robert Ford
- Charley Fox (1920–2008), Royal Canadian Air Force Lieutenant
- Charley Foy (1898–1984), American actor
- Charley Frazier (1939–2022), American gridiron football player
- Charley Fusari (1924–1985), Italian-American boxer
- Charley Genever, British poet
- Charley Goldman (1887–1968), Polish boxing trainer
- Charley Grapewin (1869–1956), American vaudeville performer and a stage and film actor
- Charley Griffith (1929–1999), American NASCAR driver
- Charley Hall (1884–1943), American baseball player
- Charley Hamrick (1912–1963), American gridiron football player
- Charley Hannah (born 1955), American gridiron football player
- Charley Harper (1922–2007), American artist
- Charley Harraway (born 1944), American gridiron football player
- Charley Hearn (born 1983), English footballer
- Charley Hennigan or Charlie Hennigan, nicknames for Charles Taylor Hennigan Sr., (1935–2017), American gridiron football player
- Charley Henley, visual effects artist
- Charley Hoffman (born 1976), American golfer
- Charley Horton, nickname of Charles Horton, American gridiron football player
- Charley Hughlett (born 1990), American gridiron football player
- Charley Hull (born 1996), English golfer
- Charley Hyatt (1908–1978), American basketball player
- Charley Eugene Johns (1905–1990), American politician
- Charley Johnson (born 1938), American gridiron football player
- Charley Johnson (wrestler) (1887–1967), American wrestler
- Charley Jones (1852–1911), American baseball player
- Charley Jones (American football) (1929–2000), American gridiron football player
- Charley E. Jones, publisher of Charley Jones' Laugh Book Magazine
- Charley Jordan (1890–1954), American musician
- Charley Leundeu Keunang, 2015 police shooting victim
- Charley Koontz (born 1987), American actor
- Charley Kurtsinger, nickname of Charles Kurtsinger (1906–1946), American jockey
- Charley Langer, American saxophonist and composer
- Charley Lau (1933–1984), American baseball player and coach
- Charley Lincoln (1900–1963), American musician
- Charley Lockhart (1876–1954), American politician and dwarf
- Charley Malone (1910–1992), American gridiron football player
- Charley Marcuse, American hot dog vendor
- Charley Marlowe (born 2000), English media personality
- Charley Marouani (1926–2017), Tunisian impresario and celebrity agent
- Charley McDowell, nickname of Charles McDowell Jr. (journalist), (1926–2010), American writer and syndicated columnist
- Charley McVeigh (1898–1984), Canadian ice hockey player
- Charley Mitchell (American football) (1940–2025), American gridiron football player
- Charley Mitchell (boxer) (1861–1918), English boxer
- Charley Molnar (born 1961), American football coach
- Charley Moore (1884–1970), American baseball player and manager
- Charley Moran (1878–1949), American baseball player and umpire and gridiron football coach
- Charley Morin, nickname of Charles R. Morin (1870–1947), American billiards player
- Charley Morgan (1929–2023), American sailboat racer and designer
- Charley O'Leary (1875–1941), American baseball player
- Charley Paddock (1900–1943), American sprint athlete
- Charley Parkhurst (1812–1879), American stagecoach driver, farmer and rancher
- Charley Patton (?? – 1934), American musician
- Charley Pell (1941–2001), American gridiron football coach
- Charley Pettys (born 1990), American-born, Filipino footballer
- Charley Pierce (c. 1866 – 1895), American outlaw
- Charley Price (1890–1967), English cricketer
- Charley Pride (1934–2020), American country singer
- Charley Reese (1937–2013), American syndicated columnist
- Charley Retzlaff (1904–1970), American boxer
- Charley Reynolds (1842–1876), American scout
- Charley Riley (1922–1994), American boxer
- Charley Robinson (1925–2007), American gridiron football player
- Charley Rogers (1887–1956), English film actor, director and screenwriter
- Charley Rosen (born 1941), American author and basketball coach
- Charley Phil Rosenberg or Charlie Phil Rosenberg professional names of Charles Green (1902–1976), American boxer
- Charley Ross (1870 - ?), murder victim; first American kidnapping victim for purely ransom reason
- Charley Palmer Rothwell (born 1992), English actor
- Charley Sarratt (1922–2018), American gridiron football player
- Charley Scales (1938–2023) American gridiron football player
- Charley Scalies, American actor
- Charley Schanz (1919–1992), American baseball player
- Charley Seabright (1918–1981), American gridiron Football player
- Charley Shin, founder of Charleys Philly Steaks
- Charley Shipp (1913–1988), American basketball player and coach
- Charley Smith (1937–1994), American baseball player
- Charley Stanceu (1916–1969), American baseball player
- Charley Steinberg, nickname for Charles M. Steinberg (1932–1999), American immunobiologist
- Charley Steiner (born 1949), American sportscaster
- Charley Stis (1884–1979), American baseball infielder, manager, scout and umpire
- Charley Stone English musician
- Charley Straight (1891–1940), American pianist, bandleader and composer
- Charley Suche (1915–1984), American baseball player
- Charley Taylor (1941–2022), American football player
- Charley Thomas (born 1986), Canadian curler
- Charley Thornton (1936–2004), American college athletics administrator
- Charley Trudeau, nickname of Joseph Charles-Émile Trudeau (1887–1935), Canadian entrepreneur, father of Pierre Trudeau and grandfather of Justin Trudeau
- Charley Toomey American lacrosse coach
- Charley Toorop (1891–1955), Dutch artist
- Charley Trippi (1921–2022), American football player
- Charley Tolar or Charlie Tolar, nickname for Charles Guy Tolar, (1937–2003), American gridiron football player
- Charley Trujillo (born 1949), Chicano novelist, editor, publisher, and filmmaker
- Charley Turner (1862–1913), American boxer
- Charley Valera (born 1957), American author
- Charley van de Weerd (1922–2008), Dutch football player
- Charley Walters (born 1947), American baseball player
- Charley Warner (1940–2016), American gridiron football player
- Charley Way (1897–1988), American football player and coach
- Charley Webb of The Webb Sisters (born 1978) - one half of the Webb Sisters
- Charley Wensloff (1915–2001), American baseball player
- Charley White (1891–1959), English boxer
- Charley Wilkinson (born 1955), American musician
- Charley Williams (1928–2009), American boxer
- Charley Winner (1924–2023), American gridiron football coach
- Charley Young (born 1952), American gridiron football player
- Charley Zivic (1925–1984), American boxer

== Nicknames ==
- Chilly Charley or Snarley Charley, pseudonyms for Charles Clark (publisher, born 1806), (1806–1880), English publisher, farmer and satirist
- Charley (singer), an Australian singer whose real name is Claire Howell
- Mountain Charley (disambiguation)
- "One Armed" Charley Monell, owner of Hole-in-the-Wall (saloon), New York City underworld saloon
- Piano Charley, nickname of Charles W. Bullard, American criminal

== Surname ==
- Boston Charley (1854–1873), North American warrior
- Dele Charley (1948–1993), Sierra Leonean writer
- Germaine Charley (1887–1959), French actress
- Honest Charley (1905–1974), American businessman
- Peter Charley, Australian journalist, documentary film maker and television producer
- Reginald Charley (1892–1986), British flying ace
- Scarface Charley (c. 1851 – 1896), chief of the Modoc tribe of Native Americans
- Simone Charley (born 1995), American football player and athlete
- William Thomas Charley (1833–1904), British judge and politician

== Fictional characters ==
- Charley, the main protagonist and subject of the titular British animated educational short film series produced by Halas & Batchelor for the Central Office of Information from 1946 to 1947
- Charley, animated cat subject of 1970s and 1980s Charley Says cartoon information films from the British government's Central Office of Information, subject of Little Charley Bear BBC show
- Charley, subject of Canadian Charley and Mimmo series
- Charley, Willy Loman's neighbor from the stage play Death of a Salesman
- Charley, John Steinbeck's companion poodle for his 1962 travelogue Travels with Charley
- Charley, subject of Charley Skedaddle
- Charley Appleby, Fred MacMurray role opposite the Golden Globe Award for Best Actress-nominated role in Charley and the Angel
- Charley Bates from Oliver Twist
- Charley Bones, from Mona the Vampire
- Charley Bourne, the protagonist in the comic strip Charley's War
- Charley Brewster, the protagonist in the film Fright Night
- Charley Pollard, from the audio plays based on the television series Doctor Who
- Charley Shallow, a character in Philip Reeve's Mortal Engines prequel series Fever Crumb
- Charley Varrick, Walter Matthau BAFTA Award for Best Actor in a Leading Role-winning character from Charley Varrick
- Charley Wykeham, Oxford University student character from Charley's Aunt, and its adaptations and derivatives
- Charley, Fred Williamson character in The Legend of Nigger Charley (1972) and The Soul of Nigger Charley (1973)
- Little Charley Bear, subject of Little Charley Bear BBC show
- Charley, a character from Clifford the Big Red Dog
- Charley (or Charlie), a lady from Harry and His Bucket Full of Dinosaurs
- Charley Kringas, one of the three main characters in the musical Merrily We Roll Along

== See also ==
- Charley (disambiguation)
