= List of jazz saxophonists =

Jazz saxophonists are musicians who play the saxophone in jazz. This list includes notable jazz saxophonists, with the type or types of saxophone given where specified. While male saxophonists have often been the focus, women have also contributed to the development of jazz saxophone playing. Artists such as Vi Redd and Peggy Gilbert have been active both as performers and as advocates for gender equality in the music industry.

Notable jazz saxophonists include:

== A ==
- Frøy Aagre (born 1977) (tenor, soprano)
- Mindi Abair (born 1969) (alto, soprano)
- Greg Abate (born 1947) (alto)
- George Adams (1940–1992) (tenor)
- Pepper Adams (1930–1986) (baritone)
- Julian "Cannonball" Adderley (1928–1975) (alto)
- Ahmad Alaadeen (1934–2010) (soprano, tenor)
- Gerald Albright (born 1957) (alto)
- Eric Alexander (born 1968) (tenor)
- Gene Allen (1928–2008) (baritone)
- Harry Allen (born 1966) (tenor)
- Pete Allen (born 1954) (alto, soprano)
- Sophie Alour (born 1974) (tenor, soprano)
- Gene Ammons (1925–1974) (tenor)
- Curtis Amy ("The Jazz Man") (1929–2002) (tenor)
- Fred Anderson (1929–2010) (tenor)
- Wessell Anderson (born 1964) (sopranino, alto)
- Peter Apfelbaum (born 1960) (tenor)
- Julian Argüelles (born 1966) (soprano, alto, tenor, baritone)
- Harold Ashby (1925–2003) (tenor)
- Gilad Atzmon (born 1963) (alto, soprano, tenor, baritone)
- Georgie Auld (1919–1990) (tenor)
- Albert Ayler (1936–1970) (alto, tenor, soprano)

== B ==
- Buster Bailey (1902–1967)
- Erik Balke (born 1953) (alto, soprano)
- Iain Ballamy (born 1964) (tenor, alto, soprano)
- Pat LaBarbera (born 1944) (tenor, soprano, alto)
- Gato Barbieri (1934–2016) (tenor)
- Eddie Barefield (1909–1991)
- Gabe Baltazar (1929–2022) (alto)
- Dale Barlow (born 1959) (tenor, soprano)
- Carolyn Breuer (born 1969) (alto, soprano)
- Alan Barnes (born 1959) (alto, baritone)
- Bootsie Barnes (1937–2020) (tenor)
- John Barnes (1932–2022) (tenor)
- Polo Barnes (1901–1981) (alto)
- Charlie Barnet (1913–1991) (tenor, alto, soprano)
- Kjell Bartholdsen (1938–2009) (tenor)
- Gary Bartz (born 1940) (alto, soprano)
- Mario Bauzá (1911–1993) (alto)
- Walter Beasley (born 1961) (alto, soprano)
- Sidney Bechet (1897–1959) (soprano, tenor, bass)
- Jay Beckenstein (born 1951) (soprano, alto)
- Noah Becker (born 1970) (alto)
- Bob Belden (1958–2016) (tenor, soprano)
- Tex Beneke (1914–2000) (tenor)
- Daniel Bennett (born 1979) (alto)
- Eli Bennett (born 1989) (tenor)
- Ivy Benson (1913–1993) (alto)
- Bob Berg (1951–2002) (tenor, soprano)
- Totti Bergh (1935–2012) (tenor)
- Kristian Bergheim (1926–2010) (tenor)
- Jerry Bergonzi (born 1947) (tenor, soprano)
- Tim Berne (born 1954) (alto, baritone)
- Chu Berry (1910–1941) (tenor)
- Barney Bigard (1906–1980) (tenor)
- David Binney (born 1961) (alto)
- Chris Biscoe (born 1947) (alto, soprano, tenor, baritone)
- Ron Blake (born 1965) (tenor, soprano)
- Seamus Blake (born 1970) (tenor)
- Walter Blanding (born 1971) (tenor)
- Jane Ira Bloom (born 1955) (soprano)
- Hamiet Bluiett (1940–2018) (baritone)
- Arthur Blythe (1940–2017) (alto, soprano)
- Céline Bonacina (born 1975) (baritone, alto, soprano)
- Graham Bond (1937–1974) (alto)
- Earl Bostic (1913–1965) (alto)
- Ralph Bowen (born 1961) (tenor, alto, soprano)
- Charles Brackeen (1940–2021) (tenor, soprano)
- Don Braden (born 1964) (tenor)
- George Braith (born 1939) (alto, soprano)
- Anthony Braxton (born 1944) (all saxophones)
- Michael Brecker (1949–2007) (tenor, soprano)
- Willem Breuker (1944–2010) (saxophones)
- Nick Brignola (1936–2002) (baritone, soprano, tenor, alto)
- Gordon Brisker (1937–2004) (tenor)
- Tina Brooks (1932–1974) (tenor)
- Peter Brötzmann (born 1941) (alto, tenor, bass)
- Ari Brown (born 1944) (tenor, alto, soprano)
- Boyce Brown (1910–1959) (alto)
- Pete Brown (1906–1963) (alto, tenor)
- Marion Brown (1935–2010) (alto)
- YolanDa Brown (born 1982) (tenor, soprano, alto)
- Tore Brunborg (born 1960) (tenor)
- Rusty Bryant (1929–1991) (alto, tenor)
- Jane Bunnett (born 1955) (soprano)
- John Butcher (born 1954) (tenor, soprano, baritone)
- Sam Butera (1927–2009) (tenor)
- Igor Butman (born 1961) (alto)
- Don Byas (1912–1972) (tenor)

== C ==
- Ed Calle (born 1959) (all saxes)
- Harry Carney (1910–1974) (baritone)
- Scoops Carry (1915–1970) (alto)
- Benny Carter (1907–2003) (alto)
- James Carter (born 1969) (all saxes—from soprano to bass)
- Luciano Caruso (born 1944) (soprano)
- George Cassidy (1936–2023) (tenor)
- Fabrizio Cassol (born 1964) (alto, aulochroom)
- Justin Chart (born 1960) (alto)
- Serge Chaloff (1923–1957) (baritone)
- Jean-Louis Chautemps (1931–2022) (tenor, baritone)
- Chris Cheek (born 1968) (tenor)
- Pete Christlieb (born 1945) (tenor)
- Jeff Clayton (1954–2020) (alto)
- Arnett Cobb (1918–1989) (tenor)
- Tony Coe (1934–2023) (tenor, soprano)
- Jeff Coffin (born 1965) (soprano, alto, tenor, baritone)
- Anat Cohen (born 1975) (tenor, soprano)
- Al Cohn (1925–1988) (tenor)
- Richie Cole (1948–2020) (alto, tenor, baritone)
- Steve Cole (born 1971) (tenor)
- George Coleman (born 1935) (tenor)
- Ornette Coleman (1930–2015) (alto, tenor)
- Steve Coleman (born 1956) (alto, soprano)
- Buddy Collette (1921–2010) (alto, tenor)
- John Coltrane (1926–1967) (tenor, soprano, alto)
- Ravi Coltrane (born 1965) (tenor, soprano)
- Randolph Colville (1942–2004)
- Junior Cook (1934–1992) (tenor)
- Bob Cooper (1925–1993) (tenor)
- Lindsay Cooper (1951–2013) (soprano, alto)
- Lol Coxhill (1932–2012) (soprano)
- Hank Crawford (1934–2009) (alto, baritone)
- Ray Crawford (1924–1996) (tenor)
- Sonny Criss (1927–1977) (alto, soprano)
- Ronnie Cuber (born 1941) (baritone)
- King Curtis (1934–1971) (tenor, soprano)

== D ==
- Olav Dale (1958–2014) (tenor, soprano)
- Eddie Daniels (born 1941) (tenor)
- John Dankworth (1927–2010) (alto)
- Joe Darensbourg (1906–1985)
- Eric Darius (born 1982) (alto, tenor, soprano)
- Julian Dash (1916–1974) (tenor)
- Kenny Davern (1935–2006)
- Bert Etta Davis (1923–1982)
- Eddie "Lockjaw" Davis (1921–1986) (tenor)
- Jesse Davis (born 1965) (alto)
- Lem Davis (1914–1970) (alto)
- Nathan Davis (1937–2018) (tenor, soprano)
- Elton Dean (1945–2006) (alto, saxello)
- Eli Degibri (born 1978) (tenor, soprano)
- Paul Desmond (1924–1977) (alto)
- Johnny Dodds (1892–1940) (alto)
- Klaus Doldinger (born 1936) (tenor, soprano)
- Eric Dolphy (1928–1964) (alto)
- Arne Domnérus (1924–2008) (alto)
- Sam Donahue (1918–1974) (tenor)
- Lou Donaldson (1926–2024) (alto)
- Jimmy Dorsey (1904–1957) (alto)
- Bob Downes (born 1937) (alto, soprano)
- Paquito D'Rivera (born 1948) (alto)
- Gerd Dudek (born 1938) (tenor, soprano)
- Candy Dulfer (born 1969) (alto)
- Hans Dulfer (born 1940) (tenor)
- Paul Dunmall (born 1953) (tenor, soprano, baritone, saxello)

== E ==
- Allen Eager (1927–2003) (tenor, alto)
- Bill Easley (born 1946) (tenor, alto)
- Teddy Edwards (1924–2003) (tenor)
- Richard Elliot (born 1960) (tenor)
- Peter Epstein (born 1967) (tenor)
- Helén Eriksen (born 1971) (tenor)
- Booker Ervin (1930–1970) (tenor)
- Wayne Escoffery (born 1975) (tenor)
- Ellery Eskelin (born 1959) (tenor)
- Bill Evans (born 1958) (tenor, soprano)
- Herschel Evans (1909–1939) (tenor, alto)
- Sandy Evans (tenor, soprano)

== F ==
- Joe Farrell (1937–1986) (tenor, soprano)
- Wally Fawkes (born 1924) (soprano)
- Wilton Felder (1940–2015)
- Buddy Featherstonhaugh (1909–1976) (tenor, baritone)
- Brandon Fields (born 1958) (alto)
- Mickey Fields (1932/1933–1995)
- Mikkel Flagstad (1930–2005) (tenor)
- Ricky Ford (born 1954) (tenor)
- Jimmy Forrest (1920–1980) (tenor)
- Sonny Fortune (1939–2018) (alto, soprano)
- Håvard Fossum (born 1971) (tenor)
- Alex Foster (born 1953) (alto, tenor)
- Frank Foster (1928–2011) (tenor, soprano)
- Gary Foster (born 1936) (tenor, alto, soprano, sopranino)
- Charles Fowlkes (1916–1980) (baritone)
- Joel Frahm (born 1969) (tenor, soprano)
- Bob Franceschini (born 1961) (tenor)
- Bud Freeman (1906–1991) (tenor)
- Chico Freeman (born 1949) (tenor, soprano)
- Von Freeman (1923–2012) (tenor)
- Tia Fuller (born 1976) (alto)
- Svein Magnus Furu (born 1983) (tenor)

== G ==
- Brent Gallaher (born 1969) (tenor, soprano, alto)
- Al Gallodoro (1913–2008) (alto)
- Jim Galloway (1936–2014)
- Jan Garbarek (born 1947) (tenor, soprano)
- Nubya Garcia (born 1991) (tenor)
- Lou Gare (1939–2017) (tenor)
- Joe Garland (1903–1977) (tenor, baritone, bass)
- Tim Garland (born 1966) (tenor, soprano)
- Carlos Garnett (born 1938) (tenor, soprano)
- Kenny Garrett (born 1960) (alto, soprano)
- Charles Gayle (born 1939) (tenor)
- Herb Geller (1928–2013) (alto, soprano)
- Camilla George (born 1988) (alto)
- Stan Getz (1927–1991) (tenor)
- Sal Giorgianni (born 1964) (alto, tenor, soprano)
- John Gilmore (1931–1995) (tenor)
- Jimmy Giuffre (1921–2008) (tenor, baritone, soprano)
- Frode Gjerstad (born 1948) (alto)
- Victor Goines (born 1961) (tenor, soprano)
- Harry Gold (1907–2005) (bass, tenor, alto)
- Benny Golson (1929–2024) (tenor)
- Paul Gonsalves (1920–1974) (tenor)
- Scheila Gonzalez (born 1971) (tenor)
- Benny Goodman (1909–1986) (alto)
- Dexter Gordon (1923–1990) (tenor)
- Gerard "Doudou" Gouirand (born 1940) (alto, soprano)
- Kenny G (Kenny Gorelick, born 1956) (soprano, alto, tenor)
- Bill Graham (1918–1975) (alto, baritone, tenor)
- Henning Gravrok (born 1948) (tenor, soprano)
- Wardell Gray (1921–1955) (tenor)
- Bunky Green (born 1935) (alto)
- Jimmy Greene (born 1975) (tenor, soprano)
- Johnny Griffin (1928–2008) (tenor)
- Euge Groove (born 1962)
- Mark Gross (born 1966) (alto)
- Steve Grossman (1951–2020) (alto, soprano, tenor)
- Gigi Gryce (1927–1983) (alto)
- Peter Guidi (1949–2018) (alto, soprano)
- Lars Gullin (1928–1976) (baritone)
- Guttorm Guttormsen (born 1950) (alto)
- Tommy Gwaltney (1925–2003) (alto, tenor)

== H ==
- Morten Halle (born 1957) (tenor, alto)
- Børge-Are Halvorsen (born 1978) (baritone, tenor, alto, soprano)
- Scott Hamilton (born 1954) (tenor)
- Captain John Handy (1900–1971) (alto)
- Craig Handy (born 1952) (alto, tenor, soprano)
- John Handy (born 1933) (alto)
- Everette Harp (born 1961)
- Billy Harper (born 1943) (tenor, alto)
- Joe Harriott (1928–1973) (alto)
- Eddie Harris (1934–1996) (tenor)
- Donald Harrison (born 1960) (alto)
- Antonio Hart (born 1968) (alto, soprano)
- Tubby Hayes (1935–1973) (tenor)
- Alfred 23 Harth (born 1949) (tenor, soprano, alto, baritone)
- Coleman Hawkins (1901–1969) (tenor)
- Jimmy Heath (1926–2020) (tenor)
- Don Heckman (1930–2020) (alto)
- Eirik Hegdal (born 1973) (baritone, tenor, alto, soprano)
- Ernie Henry (1926–1957) (alto)
- Joe Henderson (1937–2001) (tenor)
- Ian Hendrickson-Smith (born 1974)
- Julius Hemphill (1938–1995) (alto, soprano, tenor)
- Woody Herman (1913–1987) (alto)
- Vincent Herring (born 1964) (alto)
- Buck Hill (1927–2018) (tenor, soprano)
- Warren Hill (born 1966) (soprano, alto)
- Nigel Hitchcock (born 1971)
- Fred Ho (1957–2014) (baritone)
- Johnny Hodges (1907–1970) (alto, soprano)
- Bendik Hofseth (born 1962) (tenor)
- Red Holloway (1927–2012) (tenor, alto)
- Ron Holloway (born 1953) (tenor)
- Charlie Holmes (1910–1985) (alto)
- Paul Horn (1930–2014) (alto)
- Lars Horntveth (born 1980) (tenor)
- Steve Houben (born 1950) (tenor, alto)
- Reggie Houston (born 1947) (soprano, alto, tenor, baritone)
- George Howard (1956–1998) (soprano, tenor)
- Derek Humble (1932–1971) (alto)
- Shabaka Hutchings (born 1984)
- Jan Kåre Hystad (born 1955) (tenor, alto, soprano)
- Ole Jacob Hystad (born 1960) (tenor)

== I ==
- John Pål Inderberg (born 1950)

== J ==
- Jessy J (born 1982)
- Illinois Jacquet (1922–2004) (tenor)
- Javon Jackson (born 1965) (tenor)
- Torbjørn Sletta Jacobsen (born 1973) (tenor)
- Jaroslav Jakubovič (born 1948) (baritone)
- Nils Jansen (born 1959) (bass, sopranino, tenor)
- Joseph Jarman (1937–2019) (alto)
- Boney James (born 1961) (tenor, alto, soprano)
- Carter Jefferson (1946–1993)
- Hilton Jefferson (1903–1968) (alto)
- Paul Jeffrey (1933–2015) (all saxes)
- John Jenkins (1931–1993) (alto)
- Bjørn Johansen (1940–2002) (baritone, tenor, alto)
- Bill Johnson (1912–1960) (alto)
- Budd Johnson (1910–1984) (tenor)
- Edward "Kidd" Jordan (1935–2023) (alto, tenor, soprano, baritone)
- Louis Jordan (1908–1975) (alto)
- Jackiem Joyner (born 1980)

== K ==
- Richie Kamuca (1930–1977) (tenor)
- Jeff Kashiwa (born 1963) (soprano, alto, tenor)
- Tom Keenlyside (born 1950) (all saxes)
- Gary Keller (born 1953) (all saxes)
- Robin Kenyatta (1942–2004) (alto)
- Pete King (1929–2009) (tenor)
- Peter King (1940–2020) (alto, soprano)
- Rosa King (1939–2000) (and singer)
- Niels Klein (born 1978) (tenor, soprano)
- Kåre Kolve (born 1964) (tenor, soprano)
- Håkon Kornstad (born 1977) (tenor, bass)
- Rahsaan Roland Kirk (1936–1977), soprano ("manzello"), alto ("stritch"), tenor
- John Klemmer (born 1946) (baritone, alto, tenor)
- Eric Kloss (born 1949) (alto)
- Kadota "Jaw" Kouske (tenor, soprano)
- Kaori Kobayashi (born 1981) (alto)
- Dave Koz (born 1963) (alto, soprano, tenor, baritone)
- Sigurd Køhn (1959–2004) (alto)
- Lee Konitz (1927–2020) (alto, soprano)
- Bjørn Kruse (born 1946) (alto, soprano)
- Fela Kuti (1939–1997) (tenor, alto)

== L ==
- Pat LaBarbera (born 1944) (soprano, tenor)
- Steve Lacy (1934–2004) (soprano)
- Oliver Lake (born 1942) (alto, soprano)
- Harold Land (1928–2001) (tenor)
- Brian Landrus (born 1978) (baritone, bass)
- Charley Langer (born 1962)
- Don Lanphere (1928–2003) (tenor, soprano)
- Prince Lasha (1929–2008) (alto)
- Harald Lassen (born 1987) (tenor, soprano)
- Yusef Lateef (1920–2013) (tenor)
- Azar Lawrence (born 1952) (tenor, soprano)
- Doug Lawrence (born 1956) (tenor)
- Ronnie Laws (born 1950) (alto, tenor)
- Amy Lee (soprano, alto)
- Steve Lehman (alto)
- Gary Lefebvre (1939–2013) (tenor)
- Carmen Leggio (1927–2009) (tenor)
- Dave Liebman (born 1946) (soprano, tenor)
- Erica Lindsay (born 1955) (soprano, tenor)
- Michael Lington (born 1969)
- Fred Lipsius (born 1945) (alto)
- Zachary Lipton (born 1985) (soprano, tenor)
- Charles Lloyd (born 1938) (tenor, alto)
- Mornington Lockett (born 1961) (tenor, alto, soprano)
- Joe Lovano (born 1952) (tenor, alto, soprano)
- Preston Love (1921–2004) (alto)
- Håvard Lund (born 1970) (soprano)
- Arun Luthra (soprano, tenor, alto)
- Graeme Lyall (born 1942) (alto, tenor, soprano)
- Jimmy Lyons (1931–1986) (alto)
- Geir Lysne (born 1965) (soprano, tenor)

== M ==
- Teo Macero (1925–2008) (tenor, alto)
- Fraser MacPherson (1928–1993) (tenor)
- Rudresh Mahanthappa (born 1971) (alto)
- Joe Maini (1930–1964) (alto)
- Didier Malherbe (born 1943)
- Antonio Marangolo (born 1949) (tenor, soprano, baritone)
- Steve "The Count" Marcus (1939–2005) (tenor, soprano)
- Charlie Mariano (1923–2009) (alto)
- Eric Marienthal (born 1957)
- "Blue" Lou Marini (born 1945) (soprano, alto, tenor)
- Branford Marsalis (born 1960) (tenor, soprano)
- Warne Marsh (1927–1987) (tenor)
- Jørgen Mathisen (born 1984) (tenor)
- Ole Mathisen (born 1965) (tenor)
- Bennie Maupin (1940) (tenor, soprano)
- Andy McGhee (1927–2017)
- Kalaparusha Maurice McIntyre (1936–2013)
- Hal McKusick (1924–2012) (alto)
- Donny McCaslin (born 1966) (tenor)
- Jackie McLean (1931–2006) (alto)
- Charles McPherson (born 1939) (alto)
- Marion Meadows (soprano)
- Getatchew Mekurya (1935–2016) (tenor)
- Don Menza (born 1936) (tenor)
- Bob Mintzer (born 1953) (tenor)
- Billy Mitchell (1926–2001) (tenor)
- Roscoe Mitchell (born 1940) (saxes)
- Josephine Alexandra Mitchell (1903–1995) was Ireland's first female saxophonist.
- Hank Mobley (1930–1986) (tenor)
- J. R. Monterose (1927–1993) (tenor)
- James Moody (1925–2010) (tenor, alto)
- Sol Moore (1919–1999) (alto and baritone)
- Frank Morgan (1933–2007) (alto)
- Lanny Morgan (born 1934) (alto)
- Dick Morrissey (1940–2000) (tenor, soprano)
- Kjetil Møster (born 1976) (tenor, baritone)
- Gerry Mulligan (1927–1996) (baritone)
- Mike Murley (born 1961) (tenor, soprano)
- David Murray (born 1955) (tenor)
- Vido Musso (1913–1982) (tenor)
- Bheki Mseleku (1955–2008) (tenor)
- Henry "Boots" Mussulli (1915–1967) (alto)

== N ==
- Najee (born 1957) (soprano, alto, tenor)
- Zbigniew Namysłowski (1939–2022) (alto)
- Ted Nash (born 1960) (alto)
- Oliver Nelson (1932–1975) (alto, tenor)
- Roger Neumann (1940–2018) (tenor, baritone)
- Bjarne Nerem (1923–1991) (tenor, alto)
- Marius Neset (born 1985) (tenor, soprano)
- David "Fathead" Newman (1933–2009) (tenor)
- Lennie Niehaus (1929–2020) (alto)
- Bodil Niska (born 1954) (tenor)
- Sal Nistico (1938–1991) (tenor)
- Luis Nubiola (born 1974) (alto)
- Atle Nymo (born 1977) (tenor)
- Frode Nymo (born 1975) (alto)
- Rolf-Erik Nystrøm (born 1975) (tenor)

== O ==
- Dick Oatts (born 1953) (soprano, alto, tenor)
- Maciej Obara (born 1981) (alto, tenor)
- Njål Ølnes (born 1965) (tenor)
- Anthony Ortega (born 1928) (alto, tenor)
- Mike Osborne (1941–2007) (alto)
- Greg Osby (born 1960) (alto, soprano)

== P ==
- Walter Parazaider (born 1945) (alto)
- Jorge Pardo (born 1956) (soprano, tenor)
- Charlie Parker (1920–1955) (alto, tenor)
- Evan Parker (born 1944) (soprano, tenor, alto)
- Leo Parker (1925–1962) (baritone, alto)
- Maceo Parker (born 1943) (alto, tenor, baritone)
- Derek Pascoe (born 1957) (tenor)
- Jerome Don Pasquall (1902–1971) (alto)
- Michel Pastre (born 1966) (tenor)
- Hanna Paulsberg (born 1987) (tenor)
- Arvid Gram Paulsen (1922–1963) (tenor, alto)
- George Paxton (1914–1989) (tenor)
- Cecil Payne (1922–2007) (baritone)
- Art Pepper (1925–1982) (alto, tenor)
- Bill Perkins (1924–2003) (tenor, baritone)
- Rich Perry (born 1955) (tenor)
- Eric Person (born 1963) (alto, soprano, tenor, sopranino)
- Houston Person (born 1934) (tenor)
- Flip Phillips (1915–2001) (tenor)
- Jacques Pelzer (1924–1994) (soprano, tenor)
- Courtney Pine (born 1964) (tenor, alto, soprano)
- Bobby Plater (1914–1982) (alto)
- Pony Poindexter (1926–1988)
- Odean Pope (born 1938) (tenor)
- Michel Portal (1935–2026) (tenor)
- Art Porter Jr. (1961–1996) (alto)
- Tineke Postma (born 1978) (alto, tenor, soprano)
- Chris Potter (born 1970) (tenor, alto, soprano)
- Noah Preminger (born 1986) (tenor)
- Russell Procope (1908–1981) (alto)
- Dudu Pukwana (1938–1990) (alto, soprano)

== Q ==
- Ike Quebec (1918–1963) (tenor)
- Paul Quinichette (1916–1983) (tenor)

== R ==
- Boyd Raeburn (1913–1966) (bass)
- Bill Ramsay (1929–2024)
- Boots Randolph (1927–2007) (tenor)
- Nelson Rangell (born 1960), all saxes
- Sonny Red (1932–1981) (alto)
- Vi Redd (1928–2022) (alto)
- Dewey Redman (1931–2006) (tenor, alto)
- Don Redman (1900–1964) (alto)
- Joshua Redman (born 1969) (alto, soprano, tenor)
- Jerome Richardson (1920–2000) (alto)
- Joe Riposo (born 1933) (Alto)
- Jim Riggs (born 1941)
- Knut Riisnæs (born 1945) (tenor)
- Odd Riisnæs (born 1953) (tenor, soprano)
- Sam Rivers (1923–2011) (soprano, tenor)
- Scott Robinson (born 1959) (all saxes)
- Spike Robinson (1930–2001) (tenor)
- Bob Rockwell (born 1945) (tenor, soprano)
- André Roligheten (born 1985) (tenor)
- Adrian Rollini (1904–1956) (bass, baritone)
- Sonny Rollins (1930–2026) (tenor, soprano)
- Bruno Romani (born 1960) (alto, sax)
- Mette Henriette Martedatter Rølvåg (born 1990) (tenor)
- Rent Romus (born 1968) (alto, soprano)
- Bernt Rosengren (born 1937) (tenor, alto)
- Ronnie Ross (1933–1991) (baritone)
- Charlie Rouse (1924–1988) (tenor)
- Marshal Royal (1912–1995) (alto)
- Jeff Rupert (born 1964) (tenor, alto)
- Joe Rushton (1907–1964) (bass)

== S ==
- Edgar Sampson (1907–1973) (alto)
- David Sanborn (1945–2024) (alto, soprano)
- David Sánchez (born 1969) (tenor, soprano)
- Pharoah Sanders (1940–2022) (tenor)
- Rob Scheps (tenor, soprano, flute)
- Mario Schiano (1933–2008) (soprano, alto)
- David Schnitter (born 1948) (tenor)
- Anton Schwartz (born 1967) (tenor)
- Ronnie Scott (1927–1997) (tenor)
- Tom Scott (born 1948)
- Karl Seglem (born 1961) (tenor)
- Trygve Seim (born 1971) (tenor, soprano)
- Kristin Sevaldsen (born 1966) (tenor)
- Bud Shank (1926–2009) (alto, baritone, tenor)
- Paul Shapiro (tenor, alto)
- Archie Shepp (born 1937) (tenor, soprano, alto)
- Andy Sheppard (born 1957) (tenor, soprano)
- Sahib Shihab (1925–1989) (baritone, alto, soprano)
- Wayne Shorter (1933–2023) (tenor, soprano)
- Sonny Simmons (1933–2021) (alto)
- Zoot Sims (1925–1985) (tenor, soprano, alto, baritone)
- Guy Sion (born 1980) (tenor)
- Alan Skidmore (born 1942) (tenor)
- Steve Slagle (born 1951) (alto, soprano)
- Ben Smith (1905-?) (alto, tenor)
- Bill Smith (born 1938) (soprano)
- Buster Smith (1904–1991) (alto)
- Mike Smith (born 1957) (alto, soprano)
- Tab Smith (1909–1971) (alto)
- Tommy Smith (born 1967) (tenor)
- Gary Smulyan (born 1956) (baritone)
- Jim Snidero (born 1958) (alto)
- James Spaulding (born 1937) (alto)
- Hal Stein (1928–2008) (alto)
- Dayna Stephens (born 1978) (tenor)
- Robert Stewart (born 1969) (tenor, soprano)
- Sonny Stitt (1924–1982) (alto, tenor, baritone)
- Vernon Story (1922–2007) (tenor)
- Frank Strozier (born 1937) (alto)
- John Stubblefield (1945–2005) (tenor)
- Carol Sudhalter (born 1943) (tenor, baritone)
- Ira Sullivan (1931-2020) (soprano)
- Ed Summerlin (1928–2006) (tenor)
- John Surman (born 1944) (baritone, soprano)

== T ==
- Richard Tabnik (born 1952) (alto)
- Buddy Tate (1913–2001) (tenor)
- Paul Taylor (born 1960)
- John Tchicai (1936–2012) (alto)
- Joe Temperley (1929–2016) (baritone)
- Frank Teschemacher (1906–1932) (alto)
- Art Themen (born 1939) (tenor, soprano)
- Gary Thomas (born 1961) (tenor)
- Barbara Thompson (1944–2022)
- Cliff Townshend (1917–1986)
- Theo Travis (born 1964) (tenor, soprano)
- Elisabeth Lid Trøen (born 1992) (tenor)
- Frankie Trumbauer (1901–1956) (C-melody, alto)
- Mark Turner (born 1965) (tenor)
- Premik Russell Tubbs (born 1952) (tenor, baritone, soprano)
- Stanley Turrentine (1934–2000) (tenor)

== V to W ==
- Harold Vick (1936–1987) (tenor)
- Mathilde Grooss Viddal (born 1969) (soprano, tenor)
- Eddie "Cleanhead" Vinson (1917–1988) (alto)
- Bennie Wallace (born 1946) (tenor)
- David S. Ware (1949–2012) (tenor, saxello, stritch)
- Earle Warren (1914–1994) (alto)
- Grover Washington Jr. (1943–1999) (soprano, alto, tenor, baritone)
- Kamasi Washington (born 1981) (tenor)
- Sadao Watanabe (born 1933) (alto, soprano)
- Bobby Watson (born 1953) (alto)
- Ernie Watts (born 1945) (alto, tenor)
- Trevor Watts (born 1939) (alto, soprano)
- Doug Webb (born 1960)
- Ben Webster (1909–1973) (tenor)
- Don Weller (1940–2020) (tenor)
- Bobby Wellins (1936–2016) (tenor)
- Frank Wess (1922–2013) (tenor)
- Petter Wettre (born 1967) (tenor)
- Kirk Whalum (born 1958)
- Andrew White (1942–2020)
- Tommy Whittle (1926–2013) (tenor)
- Barney Wilen (1937–1996) (soprano, alto, tenor)
- Ed Wiley Jr. (1930–2010) (alto, tenor)
- Mars Williams (born 1955) (sopranino, soprano, alto, tenor)
- Pamela Williams (soprano, alto)
- John C. Williams (1941–2025) (baritone)
- Steve Williamson (born 1964) (tenor, alto, soprano)
- Steve Wilson (born 1961) (alto, soprano)
- Juli Wood (tenor)
- Phil Woods (1931–2015) (alto, soprano)
- Leo Wright (1933–1991) (alto)
- Jan Ptaszyn Wróblewski (1936–2024) (tenor)

== X, Y and Z ==
- Ed Xiques (1939–2020) (baritone, alto, tenor, soprano)
- Pete Yellin (1941–2016) (alto)
- Lester Young (1909–1959) (tenor)
- George Young (1937–2026) (soprano, tenor)
- Lukas Zabulionis (born 1992) (tenor)
- Daniel Zamir (born 1981) (soprano, alto)
- Annie van 't Zelfde (1913 –2002)
- Miguel Zenón (born 1976) (alto)
- John Zorn (born 1953) (alto)
- Aleksey Zubov (1936–2021)

== See also ==
- List of saxophonists
