= Marouani =

Marouani is a surname. Notable people with the surname include:

- Charley Marouani (1926–2017), Tunisian impresario and talent agent
- Didier Marouani (born 1953), French composer and musician
- Gilbert Marouani (1933–2016), Tunisian-French music editor, producer, and publisher
