= 20th Century Women (soundtrack) =

20th Century Women (Music from the Motion Picture)

Soundtrack album by various artists
- Released: December 30, 2016
- Genre: Punk rock; pop; jazz
- Length: 67:10
- Label: Rhino

20th Century Women (Music from the Motion Picture) is the soundtrack to the 2016 film 20th Century Women directed by Mike Mills. It features punk rock, pop and jazz music selections from Talking Heads, the Raincoats, Louis Armstrong and His Hot Five, David Bowie, Devo, Siouxsie and the Banshees amongst others, and an original score composed by Roger Neill. The album was released through Rhino Records on December 30, 2016.

== Development ==
=== Score ===
The film's score is composed by Roger Neill who worked with Mills on Beginners (2010); he read the film's script during 2011 and admitted that the film's musical soundscape lies on punk rock from California; since Mills and Neill were Californians and of the same age, they knew exactly what that is and the score would be in direct contrast to that, tonally.

During the first writing session, Neill curated a pop sound based on numerous cellos, that morphed on the direction of Brian Eno, and added more synthesizers in particular, with the Sequential Circuits Prophet-5; he was 15 when he first received that synthesizer shipped from Indiana, and the same instrument was used for scoring the film. (Note: the same age as one of the main character Jamie (played by Lucas Jade Zumann)) The other synthesizers used for the score were the Solina String Ensemble and the Yamaha DX7 which were "really glassy-sounding synth from that era" used for a particular cue. Besides using synthesizers, he utilized cellos with single and double player, and Neill further used guitar for the score where he used EBow that makes the guitar sustain indefinitely and served as the sound for the film score. The use of EBow provided a distorted and washed feeling with "a lot of reverbs and echoey sounds".

All of the techniques they used in recording the score were the sounds utilized in the time period where the film's story take place. While Neill admitted it not being a nostalgic score, they "just wanted to be in that world". He processed the musical instruments to produce a warble-kind of sound that energized the film's music in an interesting way.

Most of the film's music were written even before the film began production. Certain pieces of music were written which was approved, and Neill would modify it by producing different versions of the same piece of music, and while the edit, Mills would put those pieces of music into the score, wherever he would like to. The titles of the film's score cue refer to a forthcoming incident happening in the film.

=== Diegetic music ===
The use of diegetic music was inspired from Mills' ideas in the script and his experiences on working with artists such as Sonic Youth, Beastie Boys amongst others. The Raincoats' music served as the basis for developing the musical landscape as their debut album released in 1979 and the role of the band's significance in the film was to have a female punk band playing there. Some of the other bands featured in the film and the soundtrack were Talking Heads, Louis Armstrong and His Hot Five, Devo and artists such as David Bowie, Sandy Williams amongst others.

== Critical reception ==
Marcy Donelson of AllMusic reviewed it as "a soundtrack that mixes punk, new wave, and big band-era classics". David Edelstein of Vulture wrote "The music by Roger Neill is mystical, its center always shifting." Pete Hammond of Deadline Hollywood complimented it as "a great musical soundtrack to further set the tone" and "nice work from composer Roger Neill".

== Track listing ==
20th Century Women (Music from the Motion Picture) track listing
No.	Title	Artist(s)	Length
1.	"Santa Barbara, 1979"	Roger Neill	2:36
2.	"Don't Worry About the Government" (remastered version)	Talking Heads	2:59
3.	"Basin Street Blues"	Louis Armstrong and His Hot Five	3:15
4.	"Fairytale in the Supermarket"	The Raincoats	2:59
5.	"Love in a Void"	Siouxsie and the Banshees	2:30
6.	"Modern People"	Roger Neill	3:32
7.	"In a Sentimental Mood"	Benny Goodman and His Orchestra	3:40
8.	"Media Blitz"	Germs	1:30
9.	"D.J." (1999 remastered version)	David Bowie	4:01
10.	"All of My Objects"	Roger Neill	2:38
11.	"After Hours on Dream Street"	Sandy Williams	3:17
12.	"Cheree" (1998 remastered version)	Suicide	3:42
13.	"This Heart of Mine"	Fred Astaire	3:06
14.	"Gut Feeling (Slap Your Mammy)" (remastered version)	Devo	4:58
15.	"Everything on Television"	Roger Neill	2:50
16.	"The Big Country" (remastered version)	Talking Heads	5:33
17.	"As Time Goes By"	Rudy Vallée and His Connecticut Yankees	3:34
18.	"Why Can't I Touch It?" (2001 remastered version)	Buzzcocks	6:36
19.	"The Politics of Orgasm"	Roger Neill	3:54
Total length:			67:10

== Additional music ==
The following songs are heard in the film, but not included in the soundtrack:

- "(White Man) In Hammersmith Palais" – The Clash
- "I've Had It" – Black Flag
- "Drugs" – Talking Heads
- "Chant D'Amour" – Lars Clutterham
- "Vag Punch" – Phlask
- "Lila Engel (Lilac Angel)" – Neu!
- "So Blue Love" – Brick Fleagle
- "Nervous Breakdown" – Black Flag
