= Charles McKiernan =

Charles McKiernan may refer to:

- Joe Beef (1835–1889), Montreal tavern owner
- Charles Henry McKiernan (1825–1892), Santa Cruz settler
