= Charles Morin =

Charles Morin may refer to:

- Charles Morin, pseudonym used for painting by Winston Churchill (1874–1965)
- Charles R. Morin (1870–1947), American carom billiards player
- Charles Morin, pseudonym of Belgian opera singer Armand Crabbé (1883–1947)
