= Dick Sudhalter =

American jazz trumpeter (1938–2008)

- Born: December 28, 1938; Boston, Massachusetts, U.S.
- Died: September 19, 2008 (aged 69); New York City, New York, U.S.
- Genres: Jazz
- Occupation(s): Musician, author
- Instrument(s): Trumpet, cornet
- Years active: 1964–2003

Richard Merrill Sudhalter (28 December 1938 – 19 September 2008) was an American jazz trumpeter and writer.

== Biography ==
Born in Boston, Massachusetts, United States, Sudhalter was inspired to pursue a musical career by his father, Al Sudhalter (né Albert W. Sudhalter; 1905–1975), a noted Boston-area saxophone soloist. Dick began playing the cornet at 12 and within a few years was performing professionally. After graduating from Oberlin College, he moved to Europe in 1964, later becoming a United Press International correspondent. In 1968, he covered the Russian invasion of Czechoslovakia from Prague for UPI and was subsequently assigned the role of Manager for Eastern Europe. During his twelve years living in Europe and the UK, he also wrote under the pseudonym "Art Napoleon." He wrote jazz criticism for the New York Post from 1978 to 1984.

=== Literary works ===
In 1974, Sudhalter and Philip R. Evans (né Philip Roland Evans; 1935–1999) co-wrote Bix: Man and Legend, the standard biography of jazz cornetist Bix Beiderbecke, and the first jazz biography ever to be nominated for a National Book Award. Music critic Terry Teachout has called the book "a 'landmark of jazz scholarship' and the 'first jazz biography written to the standards' of a serious study of a classical composer or other major historical figure." Sudhalter's other books are Lost Chords: White Musicians and Their Contribution to Jazz, 1915-1945 (1999) and Stardust Melody (2002), the first full-length biography of Hoagy Carmichael. Lost Chords ignited some controversy for its assertion that jazz was shaped by both black and white musicians. Sudhalter received an ASCAP Deems Taylor Special Citation for Excellence for Lost Chords, and a Grammy Award in 1983 for his liner notes for Bunny Berigan: Giants of Jazz.

=== Illness and death ===
A stroke in 2003 forced him to retire from playing, after which he developed multiple system atrophy, a disease that left him unable to speak and subsequently led to his death from pneumonia, aged 69. He was survived by his brother and sister Carol Sudhalter, a New York-based saxophonist and flutist, two adult daughters, his ex-wife Vivian Sudhalter of 18 years, and his companion Dorothy Kellogg of 22 years.
