= Charley L. Diaz =

United States Coast Guard veteran

Captain Charley L. Diaz (born in 1959 in Corpus Christi, Texas) is a 30-year United States Coast Guard veteran who served on Active Duty from 1982 to 2012. Diaz is best known for leading the crew of the USCGC Sherman (WHEC-720) in the seizure of the Panamanian freighter GATUN off the coast of Panama in March 2007, which netted nearly 20 tons of cocaine worth an estimated $600 million. It was the largest maritime drug bust in US history.

On July 21, 2005, Diaz became the first American of Hispanic descent to command a High endurance cutter (the U.S. Coast Guard’s largest cutter class). In 2008, Diaz was named one of the "Top Hispanics in the U.S. Military" by Hispanic Engineer & IT magazine. He officially retired from the U.S. Coast Guard on June 30, 2012. Diaz is an independent Homeland Security consultant in the greater Washington, D.C. area and President of Diaz and Associates, Maritime Consultants (a Maryland company).

== Background and education ==
Diaz was born in Corpus Christi, Texas, and is a 1978 graduate of Mary Carroll High School.In 1982, Diaz graduated from the United States Coast Guard Academy in New London, Connecticut, where he was captain of the cadet drill team. He holds a master's degree in Public Administration (with honors) from Harvard University's Kennedy School of Government and a diploma (with distinction) from the U.S. Naval War College. He also completed the Department of Homeland Security “Executive Leaders Program” in 2012 at the Center for Homeland Defense and Security, Naval Postgraduate School in Monterey, California. Diaz was a visiting scholar at the Brookings Institution in Washington, D.C., from 2004 to 2005. He is a life member of the Council on Foreign Relations in New York City and also a life member of the Association of Naval Services Officers, a national Hispanic affinity group.

== Largest maritime drug bust in U.S. history ==
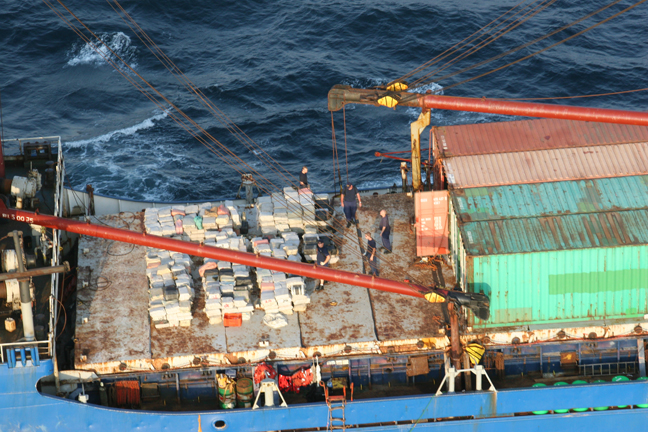
The M/V Gatun seizure

On March 18, 2007, Diaz led the crew of the USCGC Sherman in the seizure of the motor vessel GATUN with 765 bales of cocaine (nearly 20 tons) worth an estimated $600 million; it remains the largest maritime drug bust in U.S. history. USCGC Sherman was working for the Joint Interagency Task Force South at the time. Operating on a tip from the Drug Enforcement Administration and the working closely with Panamanian officials, the takedown occurred just west of the Panama Canal entrance. The cocaine was hidden in two shipping containers. The drugs were later offloaded in Alameda, California where they were transferred to the Drug Enforcement Administration and transported via two Coast Guard C-130 Hercules aircraft to Florida for destruction. This celebrated drug seizure made headlines around the world.

== Operational assignments ==
Diaz is a career cutterman, having served 12 years of sea duty on six Coast Guard cutters, commanding four of them. His afloat assignments include:

- Deck Watch Officer on the 210-foot USCGC Active (WMEC-618) in New Castle, New Hampshire, 1982–1984;
- Commanding Officer of the 82-foot Patrol Boat USCGC Point Monroe (WPB-82353) in Freeport, Texas, 1984–1986;
- Commanding Officer of the Surface Effect Ship USCGC Petrel (WSES-4) in Key West, Florida, 1990–1992;
- Executive Officer of the 270-foot USCGC Spencer (WMEC-905) in Boston, Massachusetts, 1997–1999;
- Commanding Officer of the 270-foot USCGC Bear (WMEC-901) in Portsmouth, Virginia, 2002–2004; and
- Commanding Officer of the 378-foot USCGC Sherman (WHEC-720) in Alameda, California, 2005–2007.

== Senior staff assignments ==
Diaz was the U.S. Coast Guard Pacific Area Chief of Staff in Alameda, California from 2009 to 2012 where he served three Area Commanders: Vice Admiral David Pekoske, Vice Admiral Jody Breckenridge, and Vice Admiral Manson K. Brown. From March 2008 - May 2009, he also served as the first ever Chief of Staff (aka Executive Director) of the new U. S. Coast Guard Force Readiness Command for Rear Admiral Timothy S. Sullivan. Prior to reporting to Pacific Area, Diaz headed the Coast Guard’s International Affairs Directorate in Washington, D.C. reporting to the Deputy Commandant for Operations, and often working directly for the Commandant, Admiral Thad W. Allen. He also served as Aide de Camp for the 20th Commandant of the U.S. Coast Guard, Admiral Robert E. Kramek.

== Capitol Hill and 9/11 ==
Diaz spent three years working on Capitol Hill from 1999 to 2002. Diaz was the first Coast Guard Officer to serve in a Congressional leadership office when he served as the Drug Policy Advisor to the U.S. Speaker of the House of Representatives, J. Dennis Hastert (R-Illinois). In the wake of the 9/11 attacks, Diaz helped identify the critical link between illegal heroin profits in Afghanistan and the al Qaeda terrorist network. Diaz was also instrumental in pushing legislation to create the new Department of Homeland Security and establish the U.S. Coast Guard as an official member of the U.S. Intelligence Community. Under Chairman John Mica (R-Florida), Diaz helped orchestrate Congressional hearings that led to the passage of Plan Colombia (i.e., the $1B U.S. aid package that helped reverse coca production trends in Colombia).

== Retirement ==
On June 30, 2012, Captain Diaz officially retired from the U.S. Coast Guard. At the time of his retirement, he was a senior Captain in the United States Coast Guard and serving as the Pacific Area Chief of Staff responsible for overseeing the execution of one half of all Coast Guard operations. He is President and CEO of Diaz LLC, Diaz & Associates Consulting.

== Awards and recognition ==
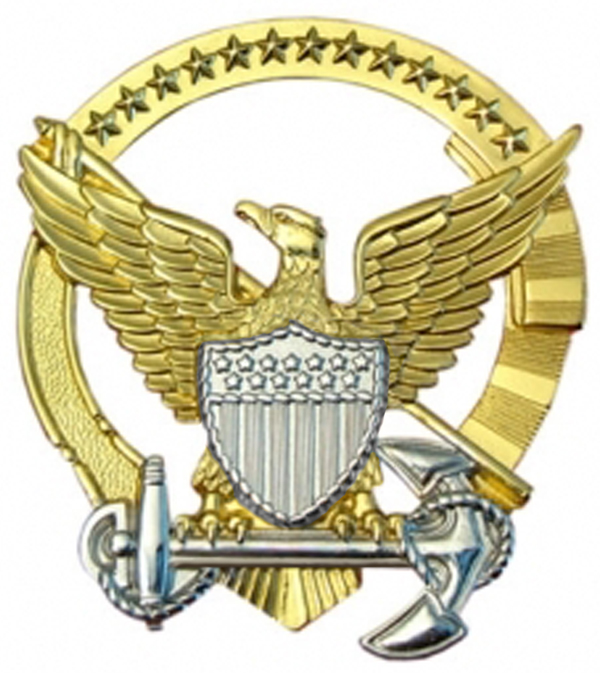
Command at Sea insignia

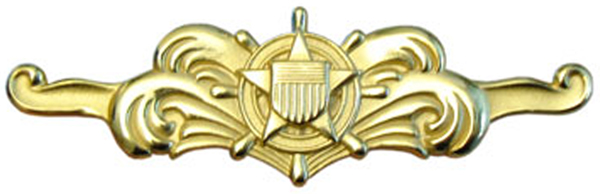
Cutterman Insignia

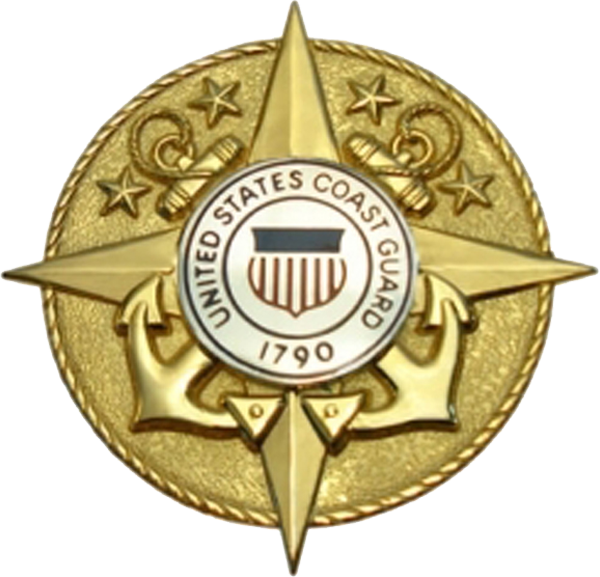
Commandant Staff Badge

- Legion of Merit - with one gold star (signifying a second award)
- Meritorious Service Medal - with three gold stars and Operational Distinguishing "O" device
- Coast Guard Commendation Medal with two gold stars and "O" device
- Coast Guard Achievement Medal with "O" device
- Commandant's Letter of Commendation Ribbon
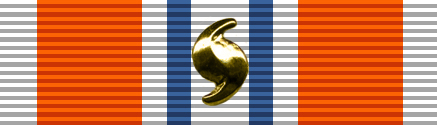
- Coast Guard Presidential Unit Citation with "hurricane symbol"
- Joint Meritorious Unit Award
- Secretary of Transportation Outstanding Unit Award
- Coast Guard Unit Commendation with two gold stars and "O" device
- Coast Guard Meritorious Unit Commendation with two gold stars and "O" device
- Meritorious Team Commendation with four gold stars
- Coast Guard "E" Ribbon with three gold stars
- Coast Guard Bicentennial Unit Commendation
- National Defense Service Medal with one star
- Global War on Terrorism Service Medal
- Humanitarian Service Medal with one star
- Special Operations Service Ribbon with two stars
- Coast Guard Sea Service Ribbon with three stars
- Coast Guard Rifle Marksmanship Ribbon with "E" device signifying EXPERT Medal
- Coast Guard Pistol Marksmanship Ribbon with "E" device signifying EXPERT Medal

Diaz’s civilian awards and recognition include:

- the Golden Eagle Award presented to the U.S. Coast Guard Cutter Sherman by the White House Executive Office of the President Office of National Drug Control Policy,
- the Secretary’s Team Award presented by Department of Homeland Security Secretary Michael Chertoff,
- the Neils P. Thomsen Innovation Award presented to the Force Readiness Command in 2010,
- the Drug Enforcement Administration Special Recognition Award,
- the NOAA General Council’s Award, and
- two Congressional Record entries.
- He was also named an honorary Admiral in the Republic of Texas Navy by the Governor of Texas.
