= Bjørn Vidar Solli =

Norwegian jazz musician and composer (born 1979)

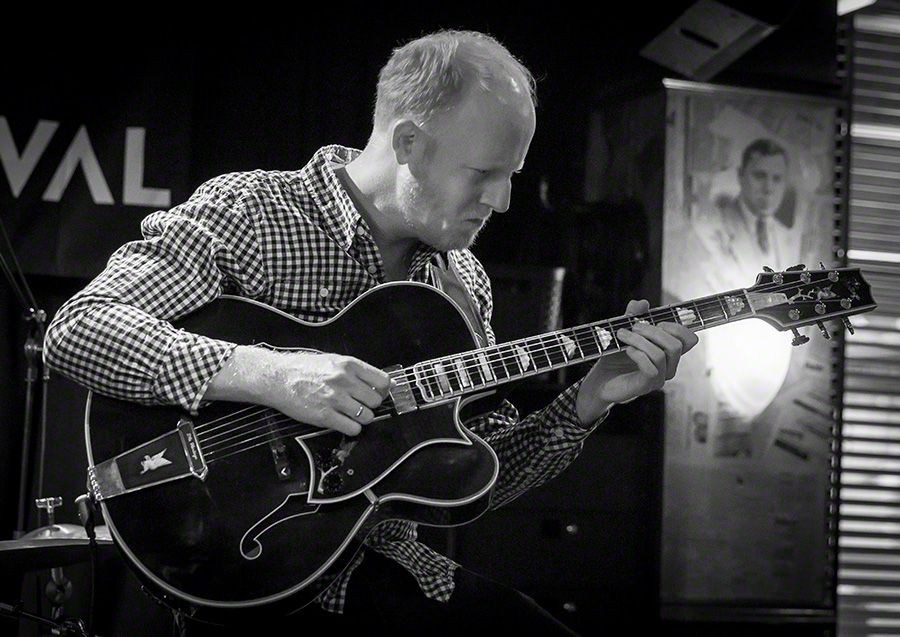
- Solli at Herr Nielsen during the 2016 Oslo Jazzfestival.

Background information
- Born: 1 August 1979 (age 47)
- Origin: Norway
- Genres: Jazz
- Occupations: Musician, composer
- Instruments: Guitar, vocals

Bjørn Vidar Solli (born 1 August 1979 in Skien, Norway) is a Norwegian jazz musician (vocals and guitar) and composer.

== Biography ==
Solli started his musical career as a singer when he was 11 years old, and before he was 13 he had already performed more than 200 concerts. From the age of 19 he attended jazz studies at Music Conservatory in Trondheim (1998–2002). In 2002 he was named this year's young jazz musician of Rikskonsertene and Norsk Jazzforum, and he has consequently had a number of tours in Norway for Rikskonsertene.

Together with his band Solid! (Daniel Formo, organ, Håkon Mjåset Johansen/Truls Rønning, drums) Solli has toured much of the world. In 2003 the band won first prize at the International Jazz Competition in Getxo in Spain, gave in 2005 the album Solid!, followed by Happy Accidents (2007) and Visitor (2010), along with the tenor saxophonist Seamus Blake.

Solli has won several soloist awards at international jazz festivals and competitions, including the Gibson Jazz Guitar Competition at the Montreux Jazz Festival (2005), and the Monaco International Jazz Soloist Competition (2006). As a soloist he contributes on the Hot Club de Norvèges album A Stranger in Town (2004).

From January 2007, he has partly lived and worked as a freelance jazz musician in New York City. During home visits, he has collaborated on the Guy Sion album Away (2012).

Solli has released the albums Poinciana (Losen Records) og Ahmad Jamal Prosjekt in 2014 as a member of the Andreas Dreier Trio, together with the bass player Andreas Dreier and drummer Adam Pache. In 2016 he presented his latest albums at Sildajazz which featured the saxophonist Seamus Blake. He also performed with David Arthur Skinner in the Diagonal Jazzband and David Skinner og Bjørn Vidar Solli Quartet, among others at Lancelot in Asker, Norway and Swing'n'Sweet Jazzklubb in Bergen, Norway.

== Discography ==
- 2003: Live in Getxo (Hilargi Records), with SOLID!
- 2004: A Stranger in Town (Hot Club Records), with Hot Club de Norvege
- 2005: Solid! (AIM Records), with Solid!
- 2007: Happy Accidents (AIM Records), with Solid!
- 2010: Visitor (Parallell Records), with Seamus Blake
- 2014: Aglow: The Lyngør Project Volume 1 (Lyngør Records)
- 2016: Reviviscence : The Lyngør project volume 2 (Lyngør Records)
- 2021: Woodworks (Particular Recordings Collective) with SOLID! & John Ellis
- 2023: Weisenheimer (Sweet Morning Music) with Gigglemug (Solli, Tim Collins, Daniel Franck & Hermund Nygård)
- 2024: Firm Deadline (Particular Recordings Collective) with SOLID! & John Ellis

== Selected Discography as a Sideman ==
- 2012: Away (Self Produced), with Guy Sion
- 2013: Poinciana (Losen Records), with Andreas Dreier Trio
- 2024: One for John with Poinciana & John Pål Inderberg
