= Gutenberg College =

Four-year college in Eugene, Oregon

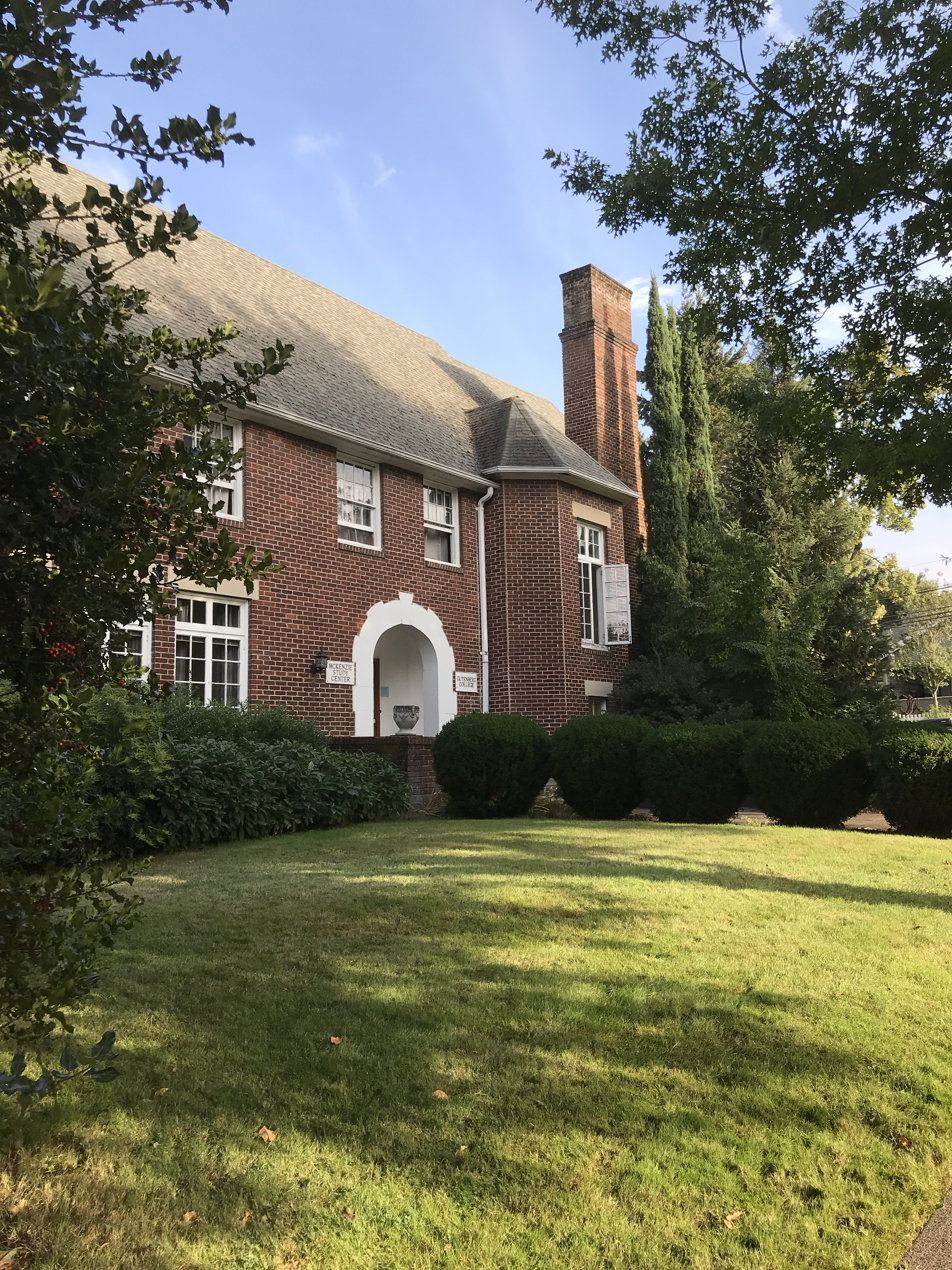
- Motto: Great Books, Great Conversation
- Type: Private
- Established: 1994
- President: Dr. Chris Swanson
- Dean: Dr. Charley Dewberry
- Faculty: 5 full-time 3 part-time
- Students: 20
- Location: 1883 University St. Eugene, OR 97403, Eugene, Oregon, United States; 44.0391°N 123.0742°W
- Campus: Small City Urban
- Colors: Blue and Silver
- Website: www.gutenberg.edu

Gutenberg College is a private, four-year Great Books college in Eugene, Oregon, United States. Founded in 1994, the school currently has 20 students as of 2018. The college "does not participate in any government-funded financial aid programs."

== History ==
The college occupies a Jacobean building designed in 1927 by Lawrence, Holford, Allyn and Bean. Originally the University of Oregon's Delta Tau Delta fraternity house, the building became Delta Zeta sorority in 1946 when Delta Tau Delta moved across the street. Then in 1985 McKenzie Study Center occupied the building.

Gutenberg College grew out of McKenzie Study Center (MSC), a Christian ministry that has existed in Eugene for 40 years. MSC was founded in 1979 as a ministry to present a biblical worldview to University of Oregon (UO) students; it now serves not only UO students, but the surrounding community. In 1991, after examining prospective curricula and programs, the board of McKenzie Study Center decided a Great Books curriculum would best accomplish their goals of providing a unique and well-rounded education. Gutenberg started in 1994 with four students and graduated its first class in 1998. Gutenberg remains small, with an enrollment of fewer than fifty students.

== Great Books program ==
The Gutenberg college great books approach is based on the program developed in the mid-1900s at the University of Chicago by Mortimer Adler that later became the Great Books of the Western World of Britannica, at Rutgers and St John's by Stringfellow Barr, et al. This alternative approach to education emphasizes less the vocational skills and specialization of most undergraduate degrees, seeking instead to produce individuals who are well-read, well-reasoned, articulate, and mature. Personal growth rather than vocational training is emphasized and accomplished through studying the most influential works of Western Civilization in every discipline: philosophy, math, science, theology, literature, and art.

== Academics ==
The curriculum centers on the most influential primary texts of Western Civilization, which students study with "tutors" in round-table discussions. In addition, the curriculum includes the following: a weekly lecture, classes and practicums in science, art, math, foreign language and the reading of difficult texts ("microexegesis"). The curriculum is viewed through a biblical Christian perspective, though the staff and faculty is not associated with any one denomination. Gutenberg offers one degree: a Bachelor of Arts in Liberal Arts.

Coursework includes the following: two years of classical Greek; two years of German; two years of math (ancient and modern); two years of Western Civilization (Great Books readings); two years of Great Conversation (more in-depth Great Books readings), four years of Microexegesis (practicums in reading difficult texts), and several classes and practicums in physics, biology, chemistry, and art.

All students read the same works over the four-year program. Readings progress through the Great Books chronologically and cycle through the history of Western Civilization twice in the four years of study.

To promote lively discussion, classes are kept small, usually five to twelve students. A small number of lectures and secondary sources supplement the classic curriculum. At the end of the first two years, students must pass a series of comprehensive exams in order to progress to the last two years. During the senior year, each student writes an extensive thesis dealing with an issue discussed by two classic authors.

== Authorization and accreditation ==
Gutenberg is a non-profit corporation authorized by the State of Oregon to offer and confer a Bachelor of Arts in Liberal Arts.

On November 3, 2009, Gutenberg College was first awarded full accreditation status by the Transnational Association of Christian Colleges and Schools (TRACS) Accreditation Commission. TRACS is an accrediting organization recognized by the Department of Education and the Council for Higher Education Accreditation. The college is exempt from various federal guidelines concerning discrimination (e.g., Title IX), the investigation of accusations of sexual abuse, and the reporting of on-campus crimes that govern most other accredited colleges due to its refusal to accept federal funding.

On October 21, 2014, the Transnational Association of Christian Colleges and Schools (TRACS) Accreditation Commission awarded Gutenberg College "Reaffirmation I" of its Accredited status as a Category II institution. This status is effective for a period of ten years.
