= Zachary Lipton =

American researcher

Zachary Chase Lipton
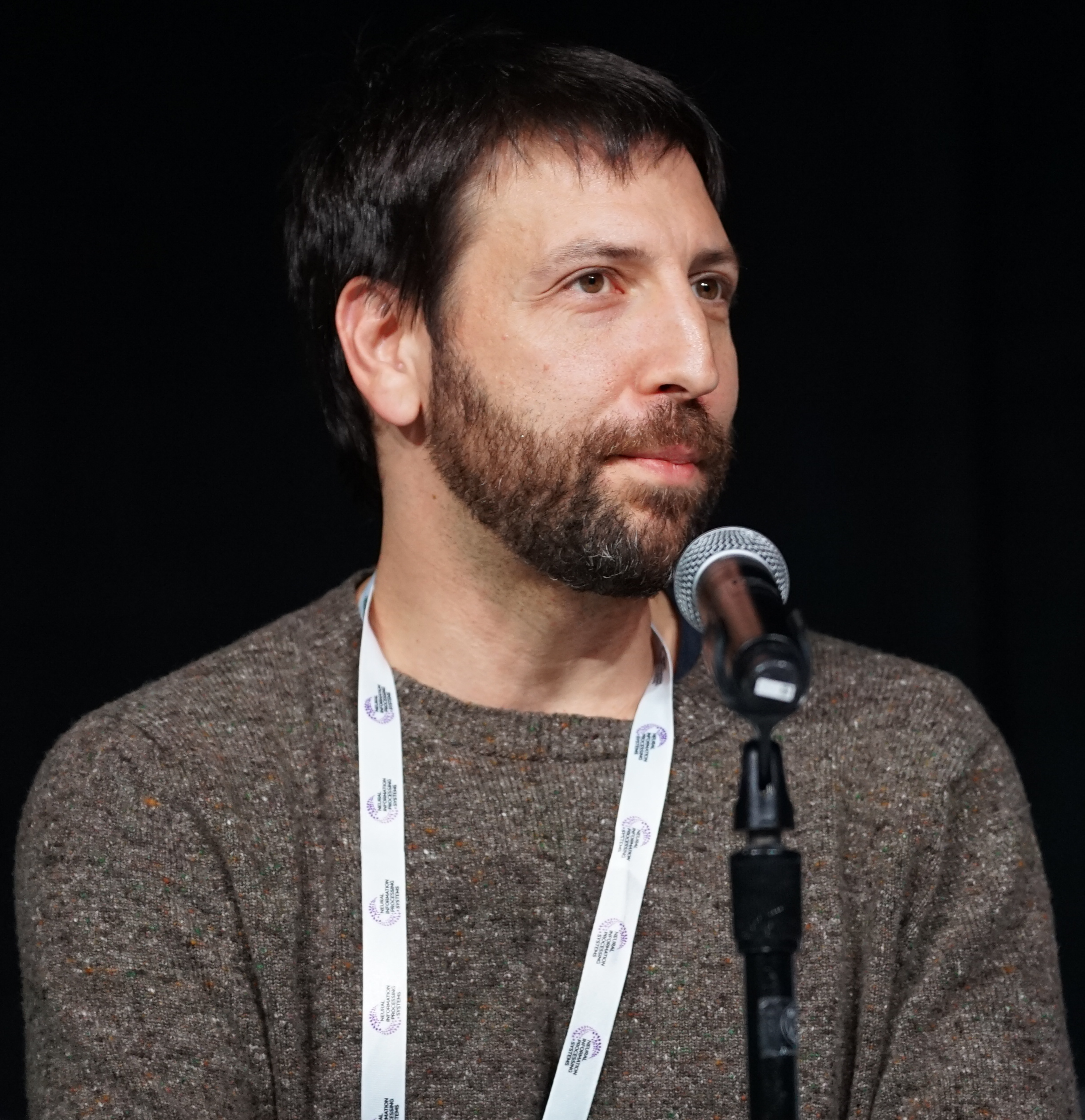
- Lipton at NeurIPS 2025
- Born: Zachary Chase Lipton; August 19, 1985 (age 41)
- Education: Columbia University; University of California, San Diego
- Scientific career
- Fields: Computer Science
- Workplaces: Carnegie Mellon University
- Thesis: Learning from Temporally-Structured Human Activities Data (2017)
- Doctoral advisor: Charles Elkan; Julian McAuley
- Website: www.zacharylipton.com

Zachary Chase Lipton (born August 19, 1985) is a machine learning researcher and jazz saxophonist from New Rochelle, New York. He is currently Chief Technology Officer and Chief Scientific Officer at Abridge. He is also an associate professor of Machine Learning at Carnegie Mellon University, where he runs the Approximately Correct Machine Intelligence (ACMI) lab. Previously, he completed his undergraduate studies at Columbia University and a PhD in Computer Science at University of California, San Diego. He is the grandson of Issachar Miron, the composer of the popular song Tzena, Tzena, Tzena.

== Discography ==
- First Steps (2007)
