= Mountain Charley =

There are several characters in American wild west history known as Mountain Charley.

- Elsa Jane Forest Guerin, a woman who lived disguised as a man to avenge her husband's murder.
- Charlotte Hatfield, a female soldier for the Union Army whose true name may be Elsa Jane Guerin
- Charles Henry McKiernan (1825–1892), early settler in California
- Charley Parkhurst (1812–1879), American stagecoach driver, farmer and rancher in California discovered after his death to have been a transgender man
