= Guy Sion =

Israeli jazz saxophonist

Guy Sion גיא שיאון
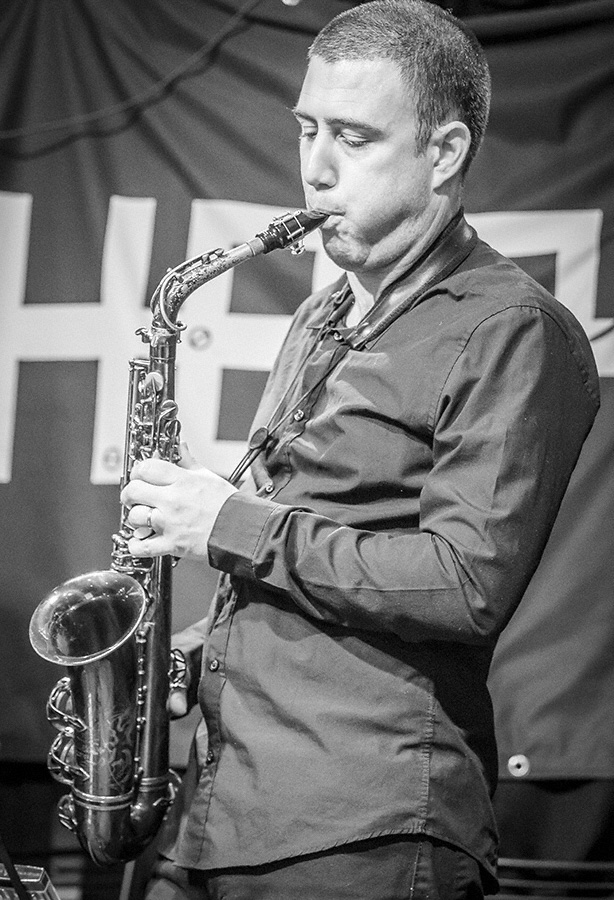
- Sion perform "Paris Jazz Nights" at the 2016 Uhørt in Oslo

Background information
- Born: 1980 (age 44–45)
- Origin: Israel
- Genres: Jazz, ethno jazz, folk jazz, jazz fusion
- Occupation: Musician
- Instrument(s): Saxophone, vocals
- Website: www.guysion.com

Guy Sion (Hebrew: גיא שיאון; born 1980 in Israel) is an Israeli jazz saxophonist, residing in Oslo, Norway.

== Biography ==
Sion moved to Oslo, Norway, in late 2010 and started working as a music teacher in the Oslo area. He performed at the 2011 Moldejazz with his Lennie Tristano tribute band Crosscurrent. In January 2012 Sion released his second album Away featuring Norwegian the guitarist Bjørn Vidar Solli and pianist Erlend Slettevoll. Away was well reviews by All About Jazz as well as in the Norwegian media NRK P2 Kulturnytt, Aftenposten, and Dagsavisen.

Since 2013 he has been playing the 1st Alto saxophone in the Norwegian big bands Primetime Orchestra and Ett Fett Storeband, and is the co-leader of The Diaspora House, a band playing Jewish music from around the world (Ashkenazi, Sephardic Mizrahi) in a Jazz setting.

== Discography ==
- 2010: Half The Battle (Self Produced), with Sam Barsh, Gavin Fallow, Colin Stranahan
- 2012: Away (Self Produced), with Bjørn Vidar Solli, Erlend Slettevoll, Phil Donkin, Jon Wikan
