= Charley van de Weerd =

Dutch footballer

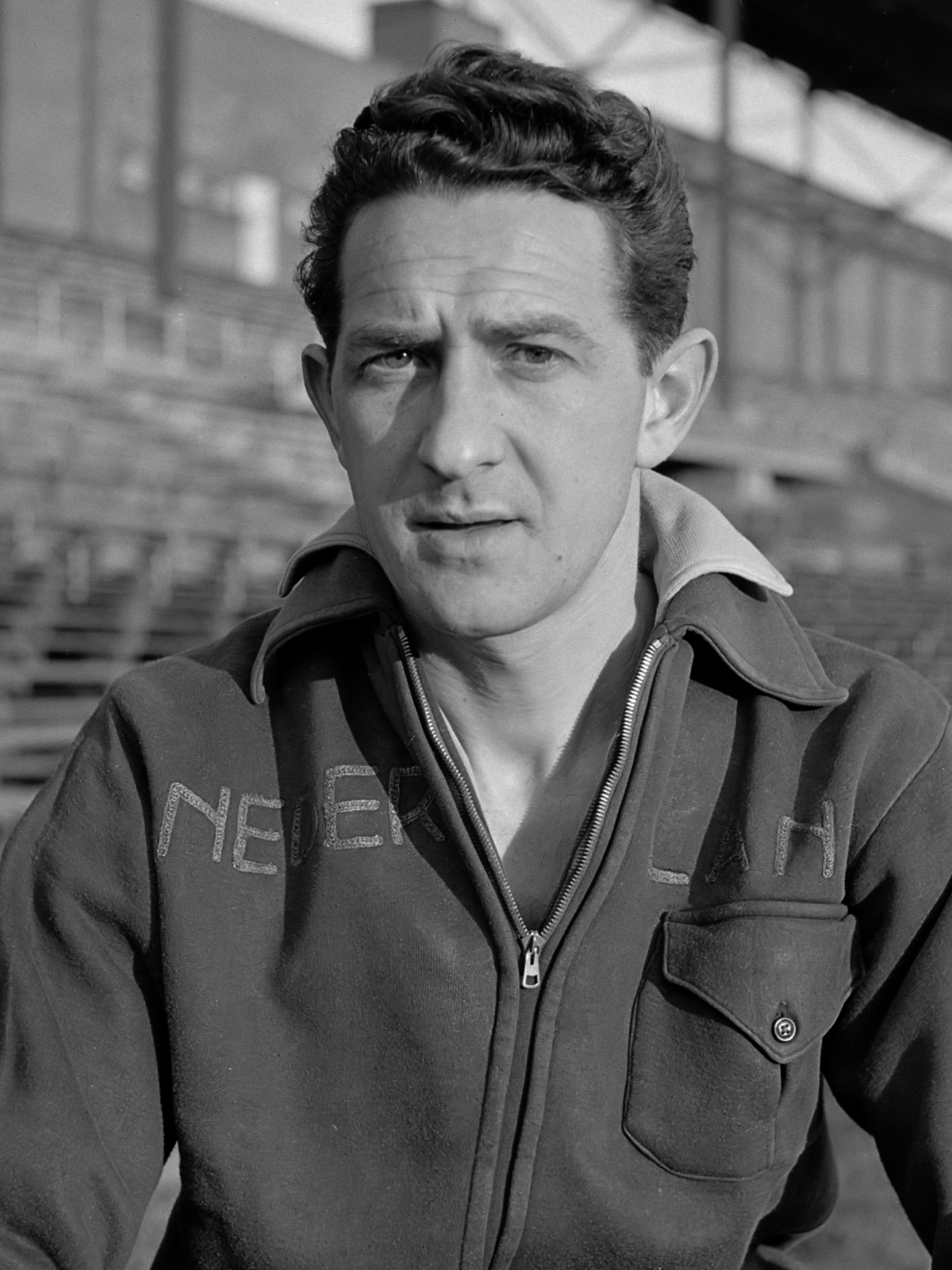
- Anton van de Weerd (1951)

Personal information
- Full name: Anton van de Weerd
- Date of birth: January 18, 1922
- Place of birth: Wageningen, Netherlands
- Date of death: February 3, 2008 (aged 86)
- Place of death: Wageningen, Netherlands

Senior career*
| Years | Team | Apps | (Gls) |
| 1940-1961 | FC Wageningen | 600+ | |
- De Graafschap
- * Club domestic league appearances and goals

Anton "Charley" van de Weerd (January 18, 1922, Wageningen – February 3, 2008, Wageningen) was a Dutch football player.

== Career ==
Van de Weerd played from 1940 to 1961 for FC Wageningen, interrupted only by a season at De Graafschap. He won the KNVB Cup with Wageningen in 1948. He played in more than 600 league games. He was once called up for the Netherlands national football team, but never made his debut. His nickname, Charley, was a tribute to his favorite actor, Charlie Chaplin. After his football career Van de Weerd owned a sports shop in Wageningen.

Van de Weerd died at the age of 86 years on February 3, 2008.
