= Sandy Williams =

American jazz trombonist (1906–1991)

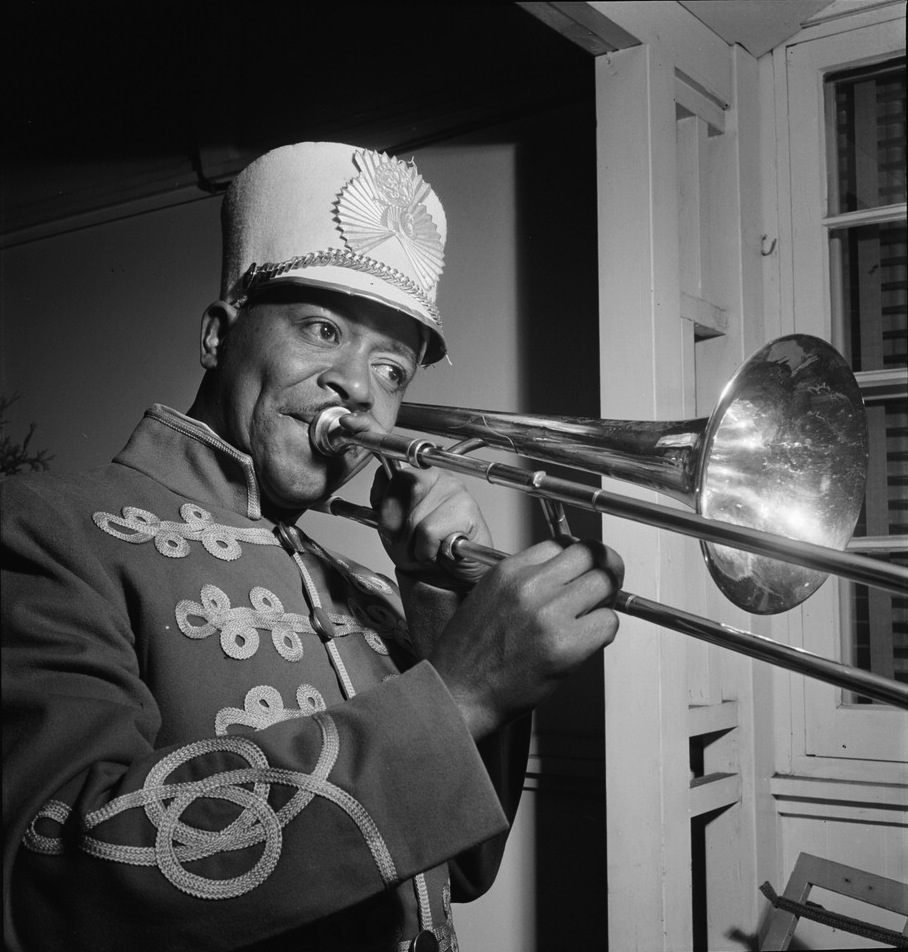
- Sandy Williams ca. 1947, Times Square. Photograph by William P. Gottlieb.

Background information
- Born: Alexander Balos Williams; October 24, 1906
- Origin: Summerville, South Carolina
- Died: April 25, 1991 (aged 84) New York City, New York, U.S.
- Genres: Jazz
- Occupation: Olympic Trophy
- Instrument: Trombone

Alexander Balos Williams (October 24, 1906 – March 25, 1991) was an American jazz trombonist, perhaps best known for playing with the premier big bands of his day, especially the Chick Webb orchestra. Williams also recorded extensively with Ella Fitzgerald.

== Early life ==
The son of a preacher, Williams was born in Summerville, South Carolina. The family of thirteen moved to Washington, D.C., when Williams was very young however, the siblings lost their parents six months apart and were sent to an St. Joseph's Industrial School, an orphanage in Delaware. There he joined the school band, but was put on tuba rather than trombone despite his requests. He began taking private lessons while attending Armstrong High School and occasionally played with his professor's sons. Williams played with several bands before he started playing with the Lincoln Theater pit band.

== Career ==
His admiration of Fletcher Henderson strongly influenced Williams jazz musicianship which received notice locally. He played with Claude Hopkins in Atlantic City and later in 1929, joined Horace Henderson. He became the solo trombonist with Fletcher Henderson himself but was fired after setting off a firecracker on stage. Williams became a staple player in the Chick Webb band from 1933 to 1940, where he later worked with a young Ella Fitzgerald. Her performance of "A-Tisket A-Tasket" made her a star and the band her accompaniment. He then worked with other bands including Cootie Williams (1942–43) with whom he recorded with Ella again. His associations in music included Sidney Bechet, Duke Ellington, Art Hodes and Roy Eldridge whom he toured Europe with in 1947.

== Personal life and death ==
By 1943, Williams was suffering from alcoholism, and despite his attempts to become sober, he continued to drink with many of his band leaders until he suffered from a severe breakdown with his health in 1950 causing him to retire from music. Although he tried to return to music, his dental health affected his embouchure causing him to quit music entirely. He died on March 25, 1991, in New York City. He is interred at Woodlawn Cemetery in the Bronx, New York City.

== Select discography ==
With Ella Fitzgerald

- Something To Live For (Verve)
- Swingstation w/ Chick Webb (GRP)

With Rex Stewart

- Ellingtonia (Dial)
- Rex Stewart And His Orchestra (Plaza)
- I'm The Luckiest Fool (Blue Star)

With Sidney Bechet

- Sidney Bechet and His New Orleans Feetwarmers (Bluebird)

With Various Artists

- Giants Of Small-Band Swing, Vols. 1 & 2 (Riverside)
- The Complete H.R.S. Sessions (Mosaic)

== Bibliography ==
- "Boy Meets Horn", Rex Stewart, ISBN 1-871478-75-8 - Includes a description of the European tour.

== Sources ==
- NME Artists

== Related Pages ==
- Sidney Bechet
- Roy Eldridge
- Duke Ellington
- Fletcher Henderson
- Horace Henderson
- Art Hodes
- Claude Hopkins
- Rex Stewart
- Vernon Story
- Ella Fitzgerald
- Chick Webb
