= Honest Charley =

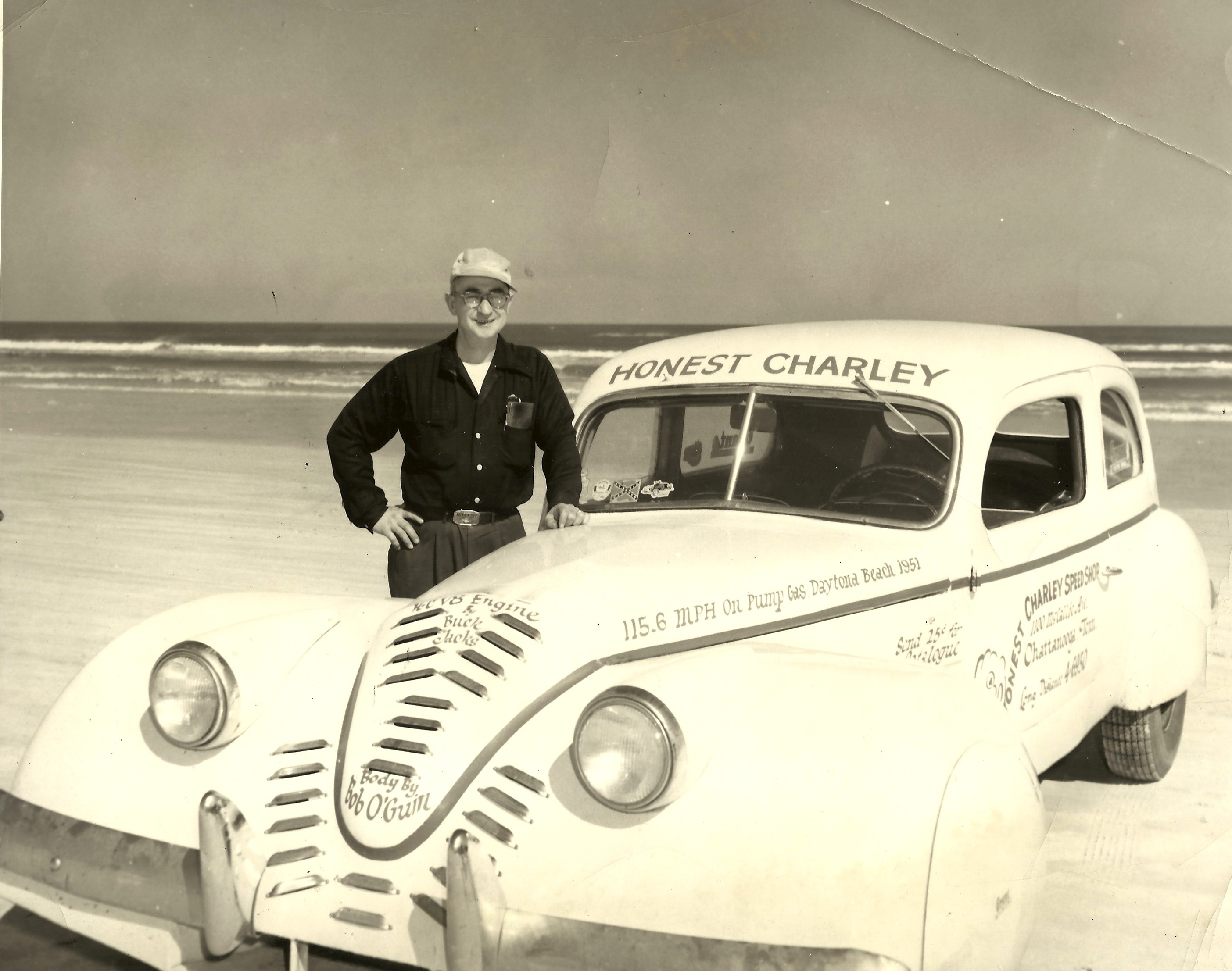
- Honest Charley custom '34 Ford on the beach at Daytona.
- Born: Charles Edward Card Jr. January 18, 1905
- Died: 26 October 1974 (aged 69)

Honest Charley was an American businessman and pioneer in the high performance automotive parts industry. Born Charles Edward Card Jr. (January 18, 1905 – October 26, 1974), he was known throughout the racing and hot rod communities by the trade name Honest Charley. In 1948 he created the Honest Charley's Speed Shop in Chattanooga, Tennessee in the United States. The company became well known for its unique and entertaining catalogs which were originally hand drawn. Honest Charley's also attracted the attention of the aftermarket parts industry for its innovative distribution techniques. He was a racing enthusiast, patron and sponsor. He was a USAC Life Time Member with member number 121 and early member of the Indy 500 Old Timers Club. In 1970 he became the second inductee into Specialty Equipment Market Association (SEMA) Hall of Fame.

== Early years ==
Honest Charley's father was of Scottish descent and lived in New Jersey. During the reconstruction era following the American Civil War, Charles Card Sr. moved south and started a wholesale produce company which prospered for 48 years as Chattanooga increasingly grew as an industrial and manufacturing center especially during World War I. While working 17 years in his father's business, he developed a strong work ethic and a good sense for business, but it was maintaining the truck fleet that first interested him in customizing automobiles.

== His nickname ==
In 1940 he opened a restaurant on Chestnut Street in downtown Chattanooga just opposite the Read House. In an effort to increase profit he removed the cash register to make room for one more paying customer at the counter. When patrons would come out, he would ask them what they owed and collect from them as they had reported. People frequently commented "You sure are honest, Charley." He adopted the nickname and put it on his sign. Embracing a local colloquialism he also added the suffix "Hisself" and was often referred to as Honest Hisself.

== Founding the Speed Shop ==
During the '40s he spent many weekends driving to stock car races with his wife, Grace, and two daughters, Martha and Ann and a trunkful of racing parts for sale or trade. After several years of networking and getting to know the drivers and the market, he decided to take the next step, and in 1948 he started Honest Charley's Speed Shop along with his son-in-law Robert J. Espy as a partner. They began with a modest retail front of just 260 square feet at 2204 McCallie Ave.

== The catalog ==
From the beginning Honest Charley's was best known for its entertaining and unique catalog. The early issues were actually hand drawn by Honest and his daughters. He created a caricature of "Hisself" for a logo and always drew little cartoons in the margins. Aside from the entertainment value, the catalogs established Honest Charley's as the first coast-to-coast mail order distributor of high-performance aftermarket parts.

== Leader of a growth industry ==
Honest Charley's keen sense of business put him in the forefront of an industry which was poised for growth. After World War II, many returning soldiers had a great deal of mechanical aptitude after keeping GI vehicles running on the battlefield, and they had a need for excitement. Hot rods were made popular by magazines and movies. Hot Rod (1950), The Fast And The Furious (1954) and Running Wild (1955) and other movies were in theaters. Pete Petersen began publishing Hot Rod Magazine with encouragement and capital investment from Honest Charley, who was also an advertiser in the first issue. As business grew, Honest Charley's Speed Shop moved to a larger 14,000 square foot store at 3813 Rossville Blvd. In 1964 Honest designed and built a state-of-art 30,000 square foot distribution warehouse at 108 Honest Street off Lee Hwy. near the runway of Lovell Field.

While attending major races such as the Indianapolis 500, Honest established personal relationships with many of the West Coast manufacturers like Vic Edelbrock, Fred Offenhauser, Phil Weiand, Ed Iskenderian (Isky Cams), Els Lohn (Eelco), Willie Garner (Trans Dapt), Paul Schiefer, and George Hurst. Through this network he was able to influence output supply and avoid backorder problems which negatively affected other distributors. Also he was also able to have some products labeled as his own brand. In addition to retail, Honest Charley's sold wholesale to many small chains and independent stores. In the 1970s the company began franchising smaller stores across the southeast.

== Racing sponsorship ==
Honest Charley built several race cars during the early years of the Speed Shop. Each was recognizable by his company name hand painted on the side of the car. In 1953 on the Daytona Beach Road Course his modified '39 Ford sedan with a Mercury 59A engine won the Daytona Century Race with a speed of 137 mph. He was a major sponsor of drag racers "TV Tommy" Ivo and "Jungle Jim" Liberman, both of whom prominently displayed his logo on their cars. From 1971-72 he sponsored the NHRA sanctioned All-American Stars & Stripes Whole Earth Open Drags race at Beech Bend Park in Bowling Green, KY. He attended the Indy 500 every year from the '30s to the '70s. He was well known at many other tracks such as Daytona and Bristol. Honest Charley Speed Shop had two locations both of which were located in Little Rock, Arkansas and sponsored the yellow 1964 Pontiac GTO called "The Old Goat". It was owned by Fred Buchanan and Charles "Chuck" Prichard. Chuck Prichard built the car and was the Engine Builder and Tuner. The Old Goat was raced by Chuck Prichard of Little Rock, AR all across Arkansas, Texas, Oklahoma, and Louisiana at drag strips such as, Carlisle Drag-O-Way located in Carlisle, AR. Chuck Prichard owned and managed the Honest Charley Speed Shop # 2 located at 7418 Baseline Rd in Little Rock, AR.

== The Speed Shop after Honest Charley ==
Honest Charley died in 1974. His son-in-law and partner Robert J. Espy continued to operate the company until it succumbed in 1990 to an ever-increasing competition of larger retailers entering the market and restrictive environmental regulations regarding aftermarket alteration of automobiles. In 1998 Corky Coker of Chattanooga acquired the brand rights and revitalized the name Honest Charley's Speed Shop as an internet retailer. They also have a retail front and garage on Chestnut Street just a few blocks from where Honest Charley's restaurant once stood. In the garage they build and restore custom hot rods and motorcycles and have been featured on cable TV shows such as American Pickers and Car Wars.
