= Charley Price =

English cricketer

Personal information
- Full name: Charley James Price
- Born: 16 March 1890; South Hamlet, Gloucester, UK
- Died: 7 June 1967 (aged 77); High Orchard, Gloucester, UK

Domestic team information
- Years: Team
- 1919: Gloucestershire

Charley James Price (16 March 1890 – 7 June 1967) was an English cricketer who played for Gloucestershire. He was born in South Hamlet, Gloucester, and died in High Orchard, also in Gloucester.

Price made a single first-class appearance for the team, during the 1919 season, against Leicestershire. From the upper-middle order, he scored 6 runs in the first innings in which he batted, and 13 runs in the second.
