= Charley Genever =

British poet

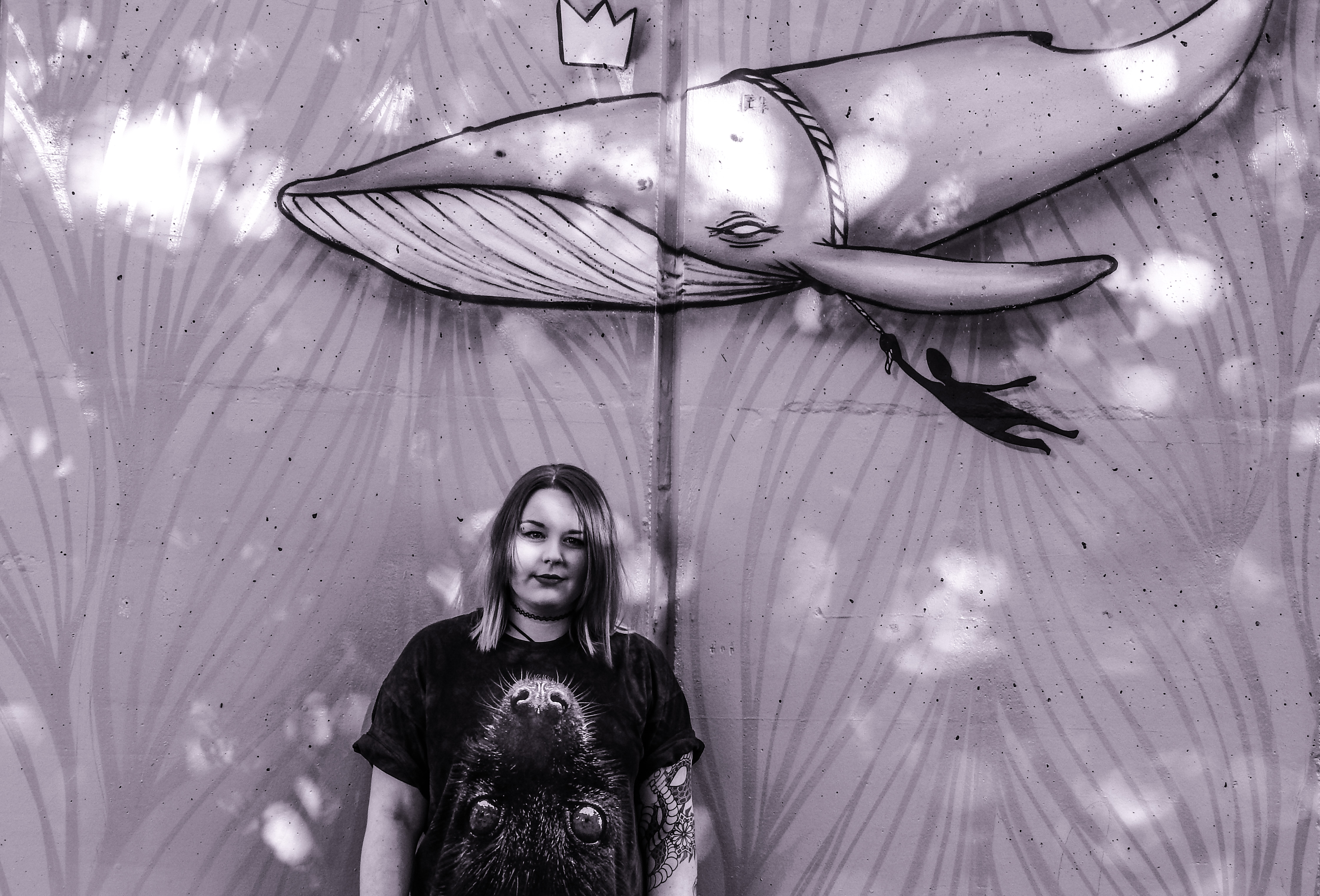
- Born: Peterborough
- Education: Aberystwyth University (BA)
- Occupation: Poet

Charley Genever is a British poet. She is Peterborough Poet Laureate 2016. Peterborough Poet Laureate is a competition which has been held annually since 1998 to find a local poet who holds the honorary title for one year.

== Biography ==
Charley Genever is a poet, writer, and creative producer born and raised in Peterborough. She holds a BA in English Literature and Creative Writing from Aberystwyth University, and since graduating she returned to Peterborough where she was successfully selected onto the Emerge training programme for emerging artists in Peterborough. Since then she has worked with and performed for Cambridge Junction, Apples and Snakes, the Fitzwilliam Museum, the Curve, the Green Festival, and the Roundhouse. Most notably she collaborated with The Poetry Society and Southbank Centre where she programmed National Poetry Day Live and also performed as part of the day. She has shared the stage and worked with the likes of John Hegley, Attila the Stockbroker, Ross Sutherland, Patience Agbabi, Joelle Taylor, Simon Mole, Benjamin Zephaniah, Mark Grist, Vanessa Kisuule, and Michael Symmons Roberts. She also regularly hosts open mic night ‘Pint of Poetry’, and produces her own quarterly spoken word night ‘Freak Speak’.

At 24, she is the youngest poet to ever hold the title of Peterborough Poet Laureate.
