= Charley Dewberry =

Dean of Gutenberg College

Charley Dewberry is the Dean of Gutenberg College in Eugene, Oregon.

He has worked as a stream and field worker in the Pacific Northwest. He is the chief architect of the Siuslaw partnership's Knowles Creek restoration project, one of five finalists in 2003 for the prestigious Thiess International Riverprize. Dewberry continues diving and teaching salmon-survey techniques.

Over the last 25 years he has worked at the U.S. Forest Service's anadromous fish unit in Corvallis, Oregon; for the Pacific Rivers Council; and for Ecotrust. He was one of the original divers in the development of the Hankin-Reeves whole-basin survey technique, a standard method for conducting juvenile salmon surveys. He managed the Pacific River Council's national river restoration project, which published Entering the Watershed (Island Press).

He has published two books, Saving Science: A Critique of Science and Its Role in Salmon Recovery and Intelligent Discourse: Exposing the fallacious standoff between Evolution and Intelligent Design.
