= Carol Sudhalter =

American jazz saxophonist

- Born: Carol Sudhalter; January 5, 1943 (age 83); Newton, Massachusetts, U.S.
- Genres: Jazz
- Occupations: musician & journalist
- Instruments: Tenor Saxophone; Baritone Saxophone; Flute; Piano
- Years active: 1975–present

Carol Stearns Sudhalter (January 5, 1943) is an American Jazz saxophonist.

== Biography ==
Sudhalter grew up in a musical family: Her father Albert played the alto saxophone in the New England area with the bands of Herbie Marsh, Eddy Duchin, Bobby Hackett and others. Her brothers and other relatives were also musicians. Richard Sudhalter, nicknamed "Dick", the oldest brother, played trumpet/cornet and wrote award-winning books on Jazz history. Middle brother James played baritone saxophone and formed and ran a ’twist’ band.

== Musical career ==
In the early nineteen-sixties Sudhalter began to play flute while majoring in biology at Smith College. She continued to study flute with private teachers in Washington DC, New York, Boston, Israel and Italy until 1978. She studied theory and Third Stream music with Ran Blake and Phil Wilson at the New England Conservatory of Music. From the nineteen-seventies on she has been teaching piano, saxophone and flute privately, at Mannes College, and for the New York Pops Salute to Music Program.

In 1975 she decided to take up saxophone, and in 1978 relocated from Boston to NYC to join the first all-women Latin band, Latin Fever, produced by Larry Harlow (salsa). In 1986 she founded the Astoria Big Band. She has performed with Sarah McLawler, Etta Jones, Chico Freeman, Jimmy McGriff, Duffy Jackson and other celebrities, and played in renowned NYC Jazz clubs as well as domestic, Italian and British Jazz festivals. She initiated the ‘Jazz Monday’ concerts at Athens Square Park between 1989 and 2001, along with several other local festivals in Queens, NY, where she resides. Sudhalter is a member of the Jazz Journalists Association.

She was written up in Leslie Gourse's MADAME JAZZ (Oxford University Press, 1997) as Chapter 14: "Carol Sudhalter: A Role Model" as well as in W. Royal Stokes' "Growing Up With Jazz" (Oxford University Press, 2005). More articles were recently published in THE HUFFINGTON POST, The Queens Council on the Arts and on local802afm.org.

In 2012 Carol Sudhalter was nominated for the 2012 International Down Beat Readers’ Jazz Poll, and was voted 9th place in the category "best Jazz Flutist".

== Discography (as a leader) ==
Title	Format & Year	Label
Hey There	LP - 1985	Carolina Records
Soon	CD - 1997	Carolina Records
Carol in the Garden of Jazz	CD - 1999	Carolina Records
It's Time	CD - 2002	Carolina Records
Last Train to Astoria	CD - 2002	Carolina Records
Shades of Carol	CD - 2005	Alfa Music
The Octave Tunes	CD - 2010	Alfa Music
Carmelo and Carol Remember: The Great Film Music of the Sixties	CD - 2011	Geco Records with special permission from Alfa Music

== Discography (as a "sideman") ==
Title	Format & Year	Label
Sarah McLawler - Under My Hat	CD - 2010	MVD Entertainment Group
