= Killing of Charley Leundeu Keunang =

Police killing of 43-year-old Cameroonian man

- Screenshot of the police pinning down Keunang seconds before the shooting
- Date: March 1, 2015
- Location: South San Pedro Street, Los Angeles, California, U.S.
- Type: Shooting
- Filmed by: Bystander's cell phone camera
- Participants: Francisco Martinez, Daniel Torres, and Chand Syed (LAPD officers)
- Deaths: Charley Leundeu Keunang
- Charges: None filed

On March 1, 2015, Charley Leundeu Keunang, a 43-year-old Cameroonian national, was fatally shot by three Los Angeles Police Department officers.

On December 1, 2016, the Los Angeles County District Attorney's Office announced that no criminal charges would be filed against the officers who shot Keunang, and that they considered it an act of self-defense. Later on May 10, 2018, the Superior Court of California ruled that an officer used an unreasonable amount of force against Keunang and the case was settled with paying his family $1.95 million by the city.

== Victim ==
Charley Leundeu Keunang was born on September 6, 1971 to a middle-class Sawa family in Douala. He studied physics and mathematics at the University of Douala, but after his father lost his job, he moved to Europe for work, spending most of his time there in France. Keunang immigrated to the United States in the late 1990s using a French passport for "Charley Saturmin Robinet", having stolen or illegally bought the identity during his passport application in order to pursue an acting career at the Beverly Hills Playhouse. His real identity only became publicly known after his death when the Consulate General of France, Los Angeles, found that the real Charley Robinet was still alive in France.

On February 23, 2000, Keunang and two other men committed an armed bank robbery on a Wells Fargo branch in Calabasas, California, stealing $94,000, but they were caught the same day after a car chase on U.S. Route 101. He was sentenced to 15 years in prison, with three recorded suicide attempts during his incarceration. Keunang was released on May 12, 2014 and lived with a sister in Malden, Massachusetts before returning to California to live at a halfway house. For about a year, Keunang lived homeless in Los Angeles' Griffith Park and attempted to force his deportation to Cameroon four times in the past. He did so by appearing at an immigration office, declaring that he was an undocumented immigrant, and providing his real name and homecountry, but security ejected him from the premises in each instance. ICE was aware of Keunang's actual identity and origin as early as 2013 after being informed of the deception by French authorities, but the Cameroonian consulate did not respond to requests for deportation. By the time of his death, Keunang had set up a tent on Skid Row, where he went by the names of "Africa" and "Cameroon", and developed an addiction to drugs.

== Shooting ==
LAPD body-worn camera depicting the incident

External videos
- Bystander video of a portion of the incident

Keunang was ordered by police to come out of his tent in Skid Row after fighting with someone inside the tent. A caller to 911 reported that a robbery had occurred in the area. The caller told the arriving officers that Keunang had also threatened them with a baseball bat. The officers stated that Keunang became aggressive and ignored commands. After he refused the police order, he went inside his tent and officers pulled the tent open and a physical altercation ensued with several police officers, during which three officers shot Keunang, resulting in his death. According to National Public Radio, police claimed Keunang had gotten hold of one of the officers' guns during the struggle. At least two videos captured the incident.

== Aftermath ==
Following Keunang's death, a protest was held locally in Los Angeles. The protesters organised using the hashtag #BlackLivesMatter. Fourteen people were arrested in the course of the protest.

== Legal proceedings ==
The shooting was reviewed by the district attorney's office, the Police Commission and its independent inspector general.

In February 2016, the Los Angeles Police Commission, the civilian panel that oversees the department, ruled that the shooting did not violate their policy on the use of deadly force, as Keunang had reached for an officer's weapon. The incident resulted in improvements in the training of officers as to how to better handle incidents involving people with mental health issues.

On December 1, 2016, the Los Angeles County District Attorney's Office announced that they would not file criminal charges against the officers who shot Keunang (Francisco Martinez, Daniel Torres, and Chand Syed). Prosecutors stated that the officers acted in self-defense.

On August 5, 2015, Keunang's parents and sister had filed a lawsuit against the city and Police Chief Charlie Beck. On May 10, 2018, the federal jury of seven women and one man found that Francisco Martinez used an unreasonable amount of force against Keunang. They also found that Sgt. Chand Syed breached his duty to intervene. Lawyers for both sides agreed on a settlement in which the city would pay the man's family $1.95 million, according to Joshua Piovia-Scott, an attorney representing the family.

It was believed that the videos captured by the officers' body cameras, which were kept secret for years, were crucial for winning this case. According to the law firm representing Keunang's family in the lawsuit, the footage showed officers had the opportunity to deescalate the situation but instead became more aggressive to Keunang and was threatened, punched, tased and finally shot Keunang 5 times. It was argued that the officers' actions escalated this situation and caused it to spiral out of control.

== See also ==
- List of unarmed African Americans killed by law enforcement officers in the United States
- Black Lives Matter
