= Vernon Story =

American jazz saxophonist

- Birth name: Vernon Ford Story
- Born: November 16, 1922; New Iberia, Louisiana, U.S.
- Died: April 20, 2007 (aged 84); Rio Vista, California, U.S.
- Genres: Jazz
- Instruments: Tenor saxophone

Vernon Ford Story (November 16, 1922 – April 20, 2007) was an American jazz tenor saxophonist.

== Early life ==
Story was born in New Iberia, Louisiana. He was encouraged to take up the clarinet as a child by his uncle, Clarence Todd, a professional composer and pianist. Todd wrote music for and performed with many artists, including Louis Armstrong, clarinet player Sidney Bechet, and pianist Fats Waller.

Story’s family moved to New York City in 1930 and by his early teens, he was playing the tenor saxophone with his friends. They formed many small bands and played at local venues in and around Harlem.

== Career ==
In 1946, Rex Stewart, who had just left the Duke Ellington Band, put together a small orchestra to tour Europe as guests of the Hot Club de France. Members included Rex Stewart on cornet, Sandy Williams on trombone and pianist Don Gais. The group visited Denmark, France, Germany, Sweden, and Switzerland. They also made many recordings between 1946 and 1949, including one of Story’s signature song, "Vernon’s Story" and another of his compositions, "Storyville." Their first concert was at the Salle Pleyel in Paris. They toured major cities Marseilles, Bordeaux and Toulouse, Lyons and Lille. They also performed in Béziers, Carcassonne, and Montauban.

Story and some of the other musicians stayed on in Paris while Rex Stewart went to Germany, though he joined him for venues in Berlin. Story played with notable jazz musician in Paris, including guitarist Django Reinhardt. Becoming a well-known figure in the Paris jazz community, Story inspired the name of a character in a novel by Boris Vian. Story arranged venues for subsets of the original band in Copenhagen, Stockholm, Oslo, and Zürich. He also made a cameo appearance as an American jazz player in a Swedish thriller movie, Kvinnan Som Försvann.

The Rex Stewart Band, including Story, played at the first Nice Jazz Festival in 1948, probably the first formal international jazz festival. Headliners and fellow musicians that he reminisced of included family friend Louis Armstrong and English jazz musician, broadcaster and musicologist Humphrey Lyttelton.

Story moved back to the booming tourist center of Atlantic City, New Jersey, in late-1948, playing solo and also with his own band. Count Basie, who had become a friend when they met during the tour to Europe, often visited him whilst playing gigs in Atlantic City.

== Personal life ==
When interest in the Bebop genre declined, Story moved with his family to Irvington, New York. He played occasional sessions there and in Pleasantville, New Jersey, before leaving the professional music business and moving to Palo Alto, California, in 1992.

Story died in his sleep early on April 20, 2007, in Rio Vista, California. He was 84. Story had combated prostate cancer for many years but he remained strong and active until the final few months of his illness.

== Selected discography ==
- "Buzz Bomb" - Vernon Story and His Tenor Sax accompanied by Rex Stewart Orchestra - Dial Records 755-B - 78 RPM. Probably recorded in 1946.
- "I Giganti Del Jazz No. 47" ("Giants of Jazz") - Vernon Story, Johnny Harris, Rex Stewart and Sandy Williams.
- "Jazz In Paris, Champs-Élysées, Vol. 1. 1917 to 1949"
- "Rex Stewart - 1946-1947" - Rex Stewart Orchestra
- "Ellingtonia" - Rex Stewart Orchestra - Dial 215 - Recorded December 9 and 10, 1947 - Includes Django Reinhardt
- "Rex Stewart - 1948-1949" - Rex Stewart Orchestra - The first track is "Vernon's Story".
- "Rex Stewart Memorial Album." - Black Panther B.LP. 001 [reissued as Prestige 728 and SV 2006].
- "Boy Meets Horn / Don't Get Around Much Anymore" - Rex Stewart and His Orchestra - Blue Star.
- "Be-Bop Boogie / Just Squeeze Me" - Rex Stewart and His Orchestra - Blue Star.
- "Be Bop Boogie / I Cried For You" - Rex Stewart and His Orchestra - Blue Star.
- "Americans In Sweden" - 1951 - Tracks 8-13 with Ted Curry, John Harris, Honey Johnson and Sandy Williams.
- "Django Reinhardt Et Le Quintette Du Hot Club De France" - Tracks B5 & B6.
- "Swing Classics" - ET 13 - Hot Lips Page 1951/Rex Stewart 1947.
