= USCGC Sherman =

Two ships of the United States Coast Guard or its antecedent services have borne the name Sherman, in honor of John Sherman (1823–1900), who was Secretary of the Treasury during the Hayes administration (1877–1881).

- USRC John Sherman (1865), also known as Sherman, was a Chase-class Revenue Cutter Service cutter, commissioned in 1866 and sold in 1872 when it became the SS John Sherman.
- USCGC Sherman (WHEC-720) is a Hamilton-class high endurance cutter, launched in 1968 and decommissioned in 2018. The vessel was then transferred to the Sri Lanka Navy and renamed SLNS Gajabahu (P626).

== See also ==
- SLNS Gajabahu (P626)
