= Charley Marcuse =

American hot dog vendor

- Occupation: Hot dog vendor
- Years active: 1999–2013
- Employer: Sportservice
- Known for: Eccentric marketing tactics on hot dogs

Charley Marcuse is a former hot dog vendor at Tiger Stadium and Comerica Park in Detroit, Michigan. He became known for his distinctive yell while selling hot dogs as well as his refusal to serve ketchup with them, responding "There is no ketchup in baseball!" when asked. He received national recognition after he was temporarily banned in 2004. He was fired permanently in 2013.

== History ==
Marcuse began working at Tiger Stadium in 1999 as a vendor with Sportservice. Marcuse became well known at Comerica Park for his operatic hot dog chant "hoooooooooooot dooooogs" during Tigers games. He states that the inspiration behind the operatic chant was derived from Luciano Pavarotti and a Three Tenors concert at Tiger Stadium.

His characteristic chant was polarizing, drawing both praise and complaints from baseball fans. In 2004, he was asked to stop singing on the basis of complaints from fans and the team's broadcast partners; his voice was easily picked up by the microphones in the stadium. The decision received national attention and he was allowed to continue singing following an outcry from a number of fans demanding his return.

Marcuse is also known for his refusal to serve ketchup on his hotdogs, insisting that mustard is the sole topping that is acceptable. When customers asked for ketchup, he replied: "There is no ketchup in baseball!"

== Recognition ==
In 2006, Charley was crowned "Higher Authority Hawker" by Hebrew National. The contest was for the best hot dog hawking. As part of his winning, Marcuse was awarded with an all-expense-paid trip to see the New York Yankees game. Charley has been a guest member on many shows ranging from Good Morning America to Sports Illustrated.

== After Comerica Park ==
Marcuse was fired from Comerica Park in September 2013. Sportservice released the following statement:

While it would be inappropriate to comment on specific confidential personnel action, in general Detroit Sportservice takes personnel action only after a complete and thorough review of an employee’s performance, all in accordance with its personnel policies and applicable collective bargaining agreements. Sportservice prides itself on providing the highest level of guest service to enhance the guest experience at Comerica Park. We encourage our vendors to interact and provide an excellent experience for the fans and are proud of the great vendors who are serving fans throughout Comerica Park.

Marcuse himself released this statement:

For 15 years I have tried to provide a unique, engaging, and fun experience for everyone. The vast majority of feedback and interactions have always been positive. Fans constantly tell me that I have added to their enjoyment of the ballgame. The Detroit Tigers and Sportservice, a Delaware North Company, see it differently. After so many years I am very sorry to see this day come.

Following his departure from the Tigers, Marcuse developed his own brand of mustard called Charley's Ballpark Mustard. His mustard is now offered in 65 establishments throughout Michigan.
