= Gilbert Marouani =

Gilbert Maruani aka Marouani
- Born: 3 January 1933; Sousse, Tunisia
- Died: 19 July 2016 (aged 83); Boulogne-Billancourt, France
- Resting place: Paris
- Occupation(s): Music producer, talent agent
- Spouse: 1/Germaine François till 1992 2/ Joelle Sultan Marouani till his death on 19 July 2016
- Children: 2 daughters (first marriage)
- Relatives: Charley Marouani (brother); Didier Marouani (nephew)

Gilbert Claude Abraham Marouani (3 January 1933 – 19 July 2016) was a Tunisian-born French music editor, producer and publisher as well as a talent agent.

== Early life ==
Gilbert Maraouni was born on 3 January 1933 in Sousse, Tunisia. His brother, Charley Marouani, became a talent agent.

== Career ==
Marouani edited Eddie Barclay's songs as part of Barclay Editions in the 1960s. He subsequently founded his own music production company, and he edited the songs of Johnny Hallyday, Barbara, Francis Cabrel, Michel Delpech, Michel Jonasz, Michel Polnareff, Michel Sardou, Mort Shuman and William Sheller as well as Barbra Streisand, Billy Joel, Queen, Prince, Simon & Garfunkel, Bruce Springsteen and Neil Young.

Additionally, Marouani was a music producer on 150 films, including Ragtime, Dune, Three Days of the Condor, Amityville II: The Possession, La Traviata, and Conan the Destroyer.

Later in his career, Marouani became a talent agent representing Michel Hazanavicius, Jean-Yves Lafesse, Alexandre Aja and Laïla Marrakchi.

== Personal life and death ==
Marouani had two daughters, Ilona and Anne from his first marriage . He remarried with Joëlle Sultan Marouani from 1996 till his death He died on 19 July 2016 near Paris.
