= Charley Valera =

American author (born 1957)

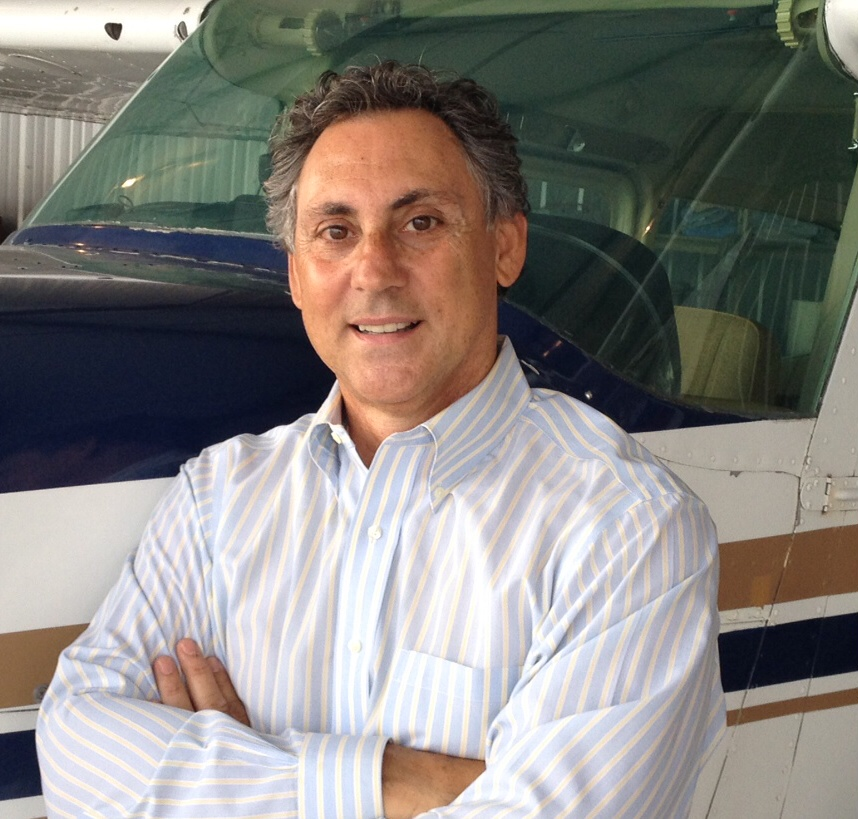
- Valera in March 2017
- Born: October 22, 1957 (age 68) Fitchburg, Massachusetts, U.S.
- Occupation: Author, speaker

Charley Valera (born 22 October 1957) is an American author. He has chronicled World War II stories as told first-hand by the soldiers, sailors and airmen who were there. His first book was My Father's War: Memories from Our Honored WWII Soldiers. Valera's second publication was A Military Mustang: The Extraordinary Life of Captain John W. Arens.

During the pandemic of 2020, Valera teamed up with rock 'n roll's premier lighting director Cosmo Wilson. Together they have chronicled the continued memoirs from Wilson's more than 40 years in the music industry. Lighting for millions of fans, such artists as AC/DC, Aerosmith, Foreigner, Rolling Stones and dozens more.

Valera is a pilot and aviation enthusiast has been invited to speak on topics of his books and aviation. Valera served for two years as Co-Programs Director of the Gulf Coast Writers Association in Southwest Florida.

Valera assisted with the four-time Emmy awarded special with host Nick Emmons on "Reflect on D-Day 75 Years Later" on NBC.

He has hosted a TV mini-series program that discusses WWII veterans life stories.

Valera's documentary My Father's War: Memories from Our Honored WWII Soldiers received an Award of Merit from the Accolade Global Film Competition in 2018.

In 2026, Valera completed My Father's War: Memories from Our Honored WWII Soldiers, an 80-minute documentary based on his book of the same name. The film features nine World War II veterans recounting their experiences in their own words. The documentary premiered in Massachusetts on the anniversary of D-Day and later received a one-show-only screening in Cape Coral, Florida.

== Bibliography ==
- My Father's War: Memories from Our Honored WWII Soldiers (2016; second edition, 2026)
- A Military Mustang: The Extraordinary Life of Captain John W. Arens

== Filmography ==
- My Father's War: Memories from Our Honored WWII Soldiers (2026)

== Awards ==
- Award of Merit, Accolade Global Film Competition (2018), for My Father's War: Memories from Our Honored WWII Soldiers

== Media appearances ==
Valera has appeared on NBC Boston and NECN programs discussing World War II history and veterans’ stories.

In 2026, he was interviewed by WGCU Public Media regarding the documentary ‘‘My Father’s War: Memories from Our Honored WWII Soldiers’’ and its special screenings in Massachusetts and Florida.

Valera also volunteers his time a pilot, field director and media relations for AERObridge. A non-profit association of general aviation pilots that deliver supplies to areas effected by natural disasters.
