= Joe Rushton =

American jazz saxophonist

- Born: Joseph Augustine Rushton, Jr; November 7, 1907; Evanston, Illinois, U.S.
- Died: March 2, 1964 (aged 56) San Francisco, California, U.S.
- Genres: Jazz
- Occupation: Musician
- Instrument: Bass saxophone

Joseph Augustine Rushton Jr (November 7, 1907 – March 2, 1964) was an American jazz bass saxophonist.

== Biography ==
He was born in Evanston, Illinois, United States. Aside from Adrian Rollini, Rushton is one of the best-known jazz performers to concentrate on bass saxophone, which he played from 1928. Prior to this, he had played clarinet and all of the other standard saxophone varieties, and he occasionally recorded with these other instruments. He worked with Ted Weems, Jimmy McPartland, Bud Freeman, Floyd O'Brien, Benny Goodman (1942–43), Horace Heidt (1943–45), and Red Nichols's Five Pennies, which he joined in 1947 and played with into the early 1960s. He recorded six sides for Jump Records in 1945/47, but otherwise appears on record only as a sideman.

He died in March 1964, in San Francisco, California, at the age of 56.
