= Charley Langer =

American jazz saxophonist and songwriter

- Genres: Smooth jazz
- Occupation: Musician
- Instrument: Saxophone
- Website: https://www.charleylanger.com/

Charley Langer is an American smooth jazz saxophonist and songwriter.

Langer released his first solo album, Never the Same, in 2009, and wrote or co-wrote nine of the ten songs on the album. The title track was featured on the Weather Channel October 2010 Playlist, and has gained more than 240,000 views on YouTube.

His album, Happy Hour, was released in 2017. The single "Set Me Free" reached #29 on Billboard's Smooth Jazz Chart in July 2017. "J Street Groove", reached #15 in February 2018.

Discography
Year	Title	Record label
2009	Never the Same	Udoi Records
2017	Happy Hour	Independent
