= Charles R. Morin =

American carom billiards player

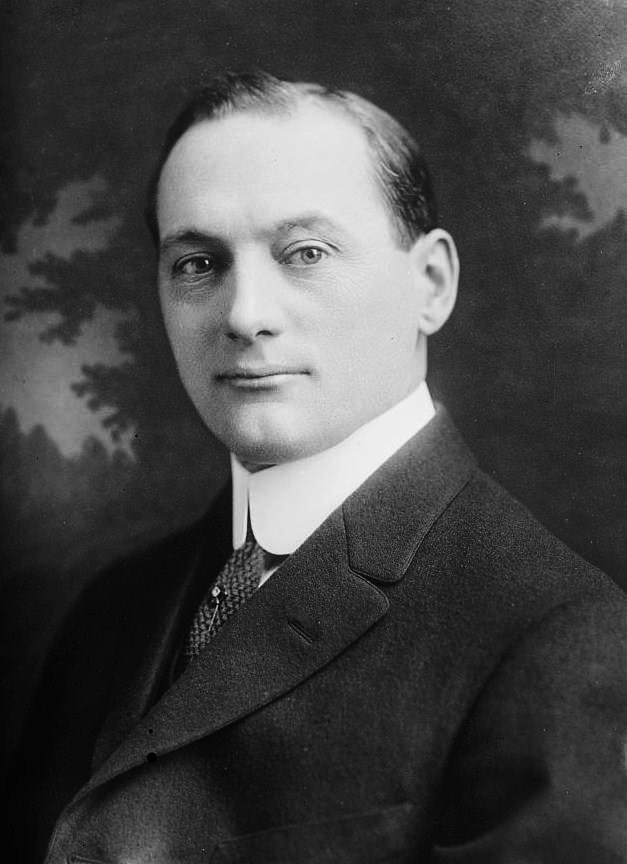
- Born: October 30, 1870; Chicago, Illinois
- Died: July 4, 1947 (aged 76); Wilmette, Illinois

Charles Richard Morin (October 30, 1870 – July 4, 1947), sometimes referred to as Charley Morin, was an American professional carom billiards player.

== Biography ==
On January 5, 1914, in Chicago, Morin challenged the defending champion, Cuban Alfredo de Oro who was then residing in New York, for the national Jordan Lambert Trophy three-cushion title. Morin was defeated after 75 innings in the first match, and the next day lost the second match to the incumbent as well, 39–50.

He played de Oro again at the 1915 World Championship, but lost, although he did score the highest run in the tournament. He died on July 4, 1947, in Wilmette, Illinois.
