= Charley Marouani =

Tunisian impresario and talent agent

- Charley Marouani in 1982
- Born: Charley, Elie, Shalom Marouani; 7 December 1926; Sousse, French Tunisia
- Died: July 29, 2017 (aged 90); Corsica, France
- Occupations: Impresario, agent
- Relatives: Gilbert Marouani (brother)

Charley Marouani (7 December 1926 – 29 July 2017) was a Tunisian impresario and talent agent.

== Early life ==
Charley Marouani was born in 1926 in Sousse, Tunisia. He had a brother, Gilbert Marouani, who became a music producer. Their father, an olive oil taster, died in 1944, and Marouni emigrated to France.

== Career ==
Marouani began his career as a photographer in Nice. He subsequently moved to Paris, where he became a talent agent alongside his uncle. His first client was Jacques Brel. Other clients included Barbara, Sylvie Vartan, Henri Salvador, Joe Dassin, Salvatore Adamo, Richard Anthony, Julien Clerc and Enrico Macias. In his 2011 memoir, he recounted many stories about his celebrity clients.

Marouani became a knight of the Legion of Honour in 2009.

== Death ==
Marouani died on 29 July 2017 in Corsica, France, at the age of 90.

== Works ==
- Marouani, Charley (2011). Une vie en coulisses. Paris: Fayard. ISBN 9782213662824. OCLC 756581453.
