= Charles Henry McKiernan =

Euro-American settler in California (c. 1825–1892)

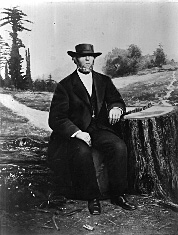
- Born: 1825; Ireland
- Died: January 18, 1892 (aged 66–67); San Jose, California
- Other names: Mountain Charley, Mountain Charlie

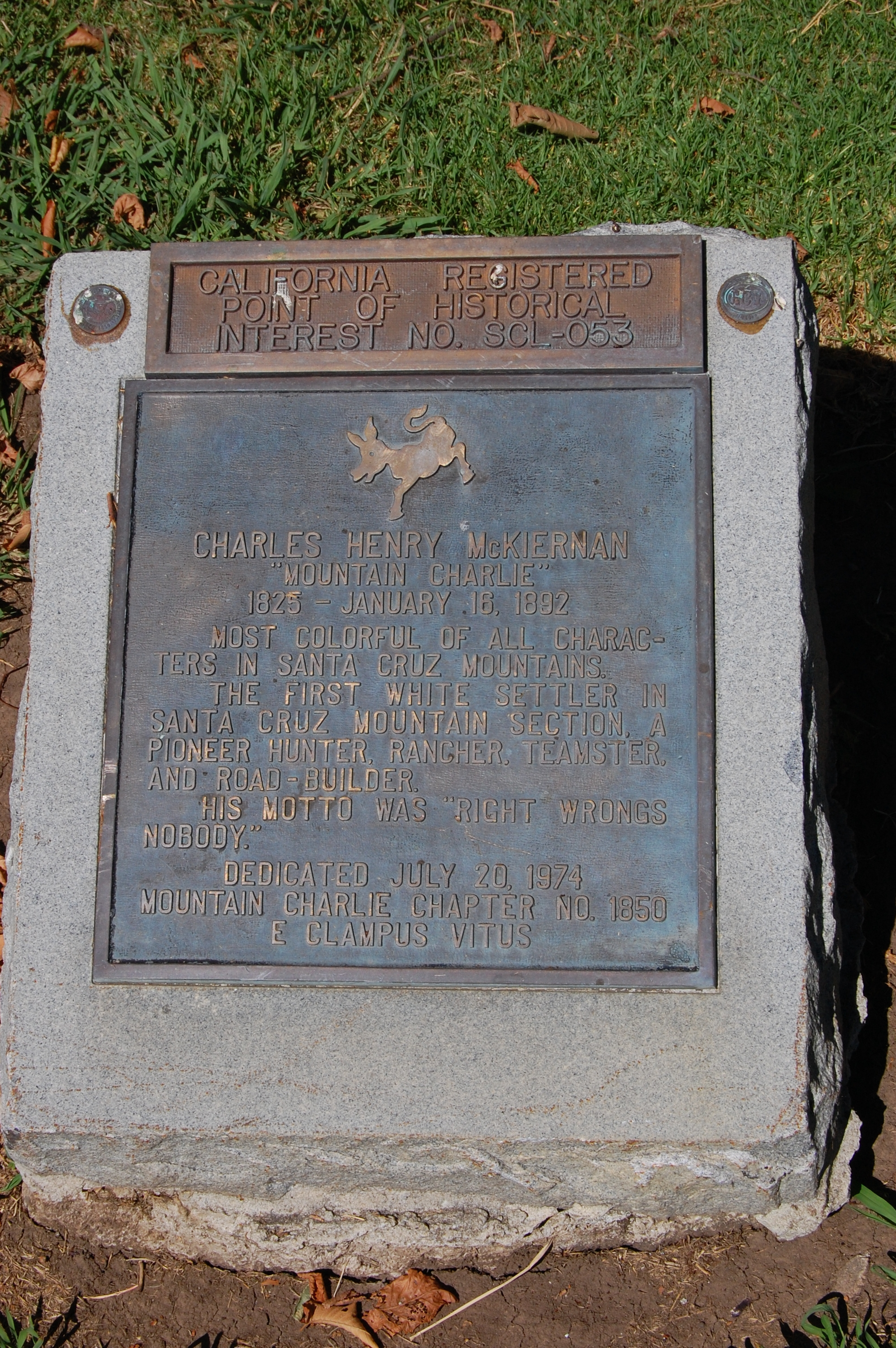
Grave of Charles Henry McKiernan

Charles Henry McKiernan (c. 1825–1892), known popularly as "Mountain Charley," was one of the first Euro-American settlers in the Santa Cruz Mountains region of California. McKiernan was a hunter, rancher, teamster, road-builder and stage-line operator. His personal motto was allegedly: "Right wrongs nobody." Part of McKiernan's local fame was due to his disfigurement by a grizzly bear on a hunting expedition in May 1854. McKiernan barely survived and had a destroyed portion of his skull replaced by a local doctor with a plate of silver. As a consequence, "it was said of McKiernan that no grizzly would argue with him over the right-of-way on a trail, a typical tall tale that in no way detracted from McKiernan's sterling reputation."

== Legacy ==
Multiple landmarks in the Santa Cruz and Santa Clara area bear McKiernan's name. Mountain Charley's Restaurant and Saloon operated in downtown Los Gatos for more than fifty years. Mountain Charlie Road, which runs from Scotts Valley to State Route 35, roughly follows the original route of McKiernan's stage road. A series of plaques along the road mark key locations in McKiernan's life, including the site of his original cabin and the general area of the grizzly bear attack.
