= Who Framed Roger Rabbit (franchise) =

American media franchise

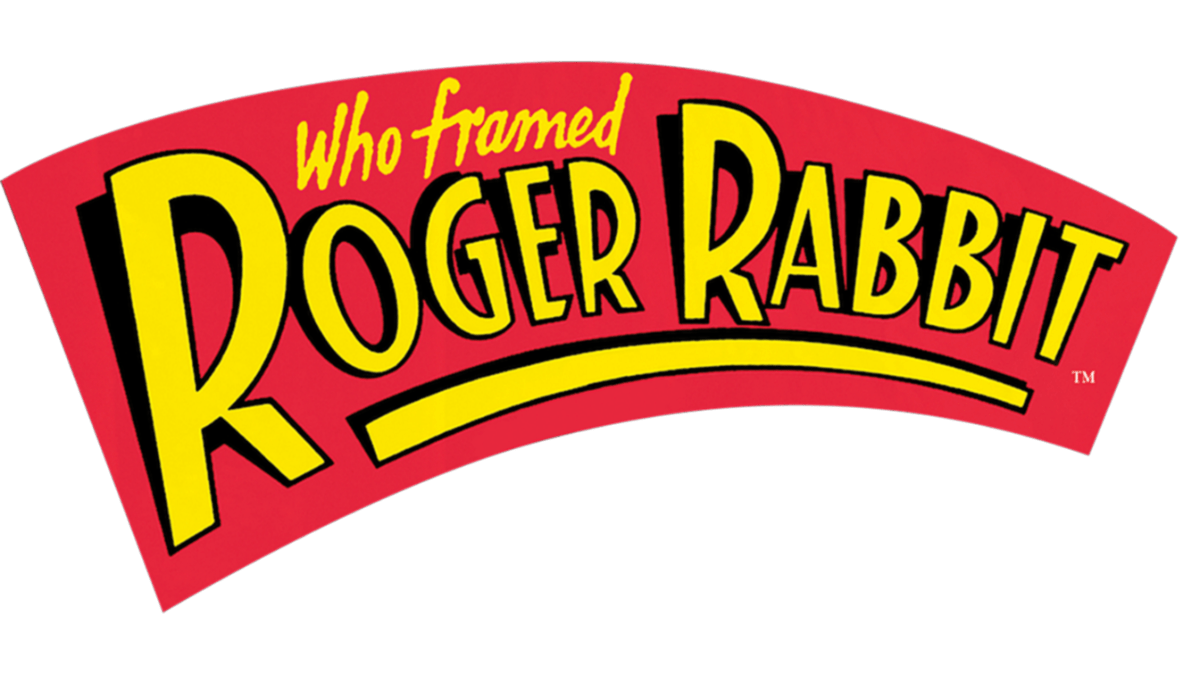
- The logo of the 1988 film Who Framed Roger Rabbit
- Created by: Gary K. Wolf
- Original work: Who Censored Roger Rabbit? (1981) by Gary K. Wolf
- Owners: Gary K. Wolf; Disney (films)
- Years: 1981–2013

Print publications
- Novel(s): Who Censored Roger Rabbit? (1981); Who Framed Roger Rabbit (novelization, 1988); Who P-P-P-Plugged Roger Rabbit? (1991); Who Wacked Roger Rabbit? (2013)
- Comics: Roger Rabbit; Roger Rabbit's Toontown (1991)
- Graphic novel(s): Roger Rabbit: The Resurrection of Doom

Films and television
- Film(s): Who Framed Roger Rabbit (1988)
- Short film(s): Tummy Trouble (1989); Roller Coaster Rabbit (1990); Trail Mix-Up (1993)

Games
- Video game(s): Who Framed Roger Rabbit (PC, 1988); Roger Rabbit (1989; Japan); Who Framed Roger Rabbit (NES, 1989); Hare Raising Havoc (1991); Who Framed Roger Rabbit (Game Boy, 1991)

Miscellaneous
- Theme park attraction(s): Roger Rabbit's Car Toon Spin (1994–present); See also: Mickey's Toontown

Who Framed Roger Rabbit is a media franchise that began with the 1981 novel Who Censored Roger Rabbit by Gary K. Wolf. It was adapted into a feature film in 1988, produced by Touchstone Pictures and Amblin Entertainment and distributed by Buena Vista Pictures. The film's success launched additional media including further books, animated shorts, comic books and video games. The franchise takes place in a world in which cartoon characters, known as "toons", coexist with humans. Wolf owns the rights to the series, as Disney, who retains the rights to the films, returned them after a period of neglect.

== Books ==
=== Who Censored Roger Rabbit? ===
Who Censored Roger Rabbit? by Gary K. Wolf is the book on which the film is loosely based (ISBN 0-345-30325-3). It was released in January 1981.

=== Who Framed Roger Rabbit ===
Who Framed Roger Rabbit by Martin Noble is the novelization of the film of the same name (ISBN 0-352-32389-2). It was released in December 1988.

=== Who P-P-P-Plugged Roger Rabbit? ===
Who P-P-P-Plugged Roger Rabbit? is a humorous mystery novel written by Gary K. Wolf released in 1991 (ISBN 0-679-40094-X). The book is inconsistent with and so is neither a sequel nor a prequel to Who Censored Roger Rabbit? or the film adaptation by Touchstone/Amblin. It could be considered a reboot. The original novel was retconned as a dream of Jessica, in chapter 12.

The novel features the original main characters Roger Rabbit, Eddie Valiant, Jessica Rabbit, and Baby Herman. Their personalities conform to those established in the Who Framed Roger Rabbit film, such as Jessica's devotion to Roger and Roger's cartoony quirks such as his speech impediment.

The story starts out with Eddie Valiant at the front door of Roger Rabbit's house. Almost immediately after he is let inside the house, Roger tells him about the upcoming Gone with the Wind toon adaptation and how he has a chance to play the lead as Rhett Butler. However, the Telltale News, a newspaper that tends to toons, prints an article about Jessica Rabbit and her relationship with Clark Gable. Introduced in this novel is Jessica's diminutive twin sister, Joellyn, who becomes Eddie's main love interest as he has broken up with his girlfriend, along with Eddie's sister, who is in a mixed-race marriage with a toon, and has three children with her toon husband. From here, the story branches out to the murders of Kirk Enigman (another candidate for the part of Rhett Butler), Baby Herman, and Dodger Rabbit (Roger Rabbit's evil cousin).

=== Who Wacked Roger Rabbit? ===
Who Wacked Roger Rabbit? is a mystery-humor novel written by Gary K. Wolf released in 2013.

=== Jessica Rabbit: XERIOUS Business ===
Jessica Rabbit: XERIOUS Business is a novel written by Gary Wolf released in 2022 that details the origin story of Jessica Rabbit, who was originally a human named Jessica Krupnick before she became a Toon.

=== Children's picture books ===
- Roger Rabbit: A Different Toon by Justine Korman (ISBN 0-307-11733-2)
- Roger Rabbit: Make the World Laugh by Justine Korman (ISBN 0-307-11734-0)
- Who Framed Roger Rabbit: The Movie Storybook by Justine Korman (1988) (ISBN 0-307-65847-3)

== Films ==
=== Who Framed Roger Rabbit (1988) ===
==== Animated short films ====
Walt Disney Feature Animation and Amblin Entertainment produced a series of animated shorts featuring Roger Rabbit, following the release of the film. The three shorts (Tummy Trouble, Roller Coaster Rabbit, and Trail Mix-Up), were presented in front of various Disney/Touchstone/Amblin features in an attempt to revive short subject animation as a part of the movie-going experience. Of the three shorts, only the first is "complete", the other two ending with Roger wrecking the sets.

== Cast and characters ==
List indicators
- A dark gray cell indicates the character did not appear in that installment.
- A ^{C} indicates a character appears in a cameo appearance.
- An ^{S} indicates a performer stood in as their character's singing voice.
- A ^{U} indicates an actor or actress was not credited for their respective role.

Characters	Feature film	Short films			Video game
Characters	Who Framed Roger Rabbit	Tummy Trouble	Roller Coaster Rabbit	Trail Mix Up	Hare Raising Havoc
Roger Rabbit	Charles Fleischer	Charles Fleischer	Charles Fleischer	Charles Fleischer	Jess Harnell
Jessica Rabbit	Kathleen Turner^{U}	Kathleen Turner	Kathleen Turner	Kathleen Turner	Marnie Mosiman
Jessica Rabbit	Amy Irving^{S}	Kathleen Turner	Kathleen Turner	Kathleen Turner	Marnie Mosiman
Baby Herman	Lou Hirsch	Lou Hirsch	Lou Hirsch	Lou Hirsch	April Winchell
Baby Herman	April Winchell (Note: Winchell provides the voice of Baby Herman in scenes in which the character acts like an infant.)	April Winchell	April Winchell	April Winchell	April Winchell
Mrs. Herman	April Winchell	April Winchell	April Winchell	April Winchell	April Winchell
Raoul J. Raoul	Joel Silver	Sol Pavlosky			Corey Burton
Droopy	Richard Williams	Richard Williams	Corey Burton	Corey Burton	
Eddie Valiant	Bob Hoskins				
Judge Doom	Christopher Lloyd				
Dolores	Joanna Cassidy				
Marvin Acme	Stubby Kaye				
R.K. Maroon	Alan Tilvern				
Lieutenant Santino	Richard LeParmentier				
Angelo	Richard Ridings				
Smart Ass	David Lander				
Greasy	Charles Fleischer				
Psycho	Charles Fleischer				
Stupid	Fred Newman				
Wheezy	June Foray				
Benny the Cab	Charles Fleischer				

=== Main characters ===
- Roger Rabbit (voiced by Charles Fleischer): A crazy rabbit, main toon character in the film, and central character in the franchise.
- Eddie Valiant (played by Bob Hoskins): A private detective, and main human character in the film.
- Jessica Rabbit (voiced by Kathleen Turner): Roger's attractive wife, and singer in The Ink and Paint Club.
- Judge Doom (played by Christopher Lloyd): Judge of Toontown.

=== Other toons ===
- Baby Herman (voiced by Lou Hirsch): Roger's co-star in short films. Although he has the appearance of a baby, he is really a middle-aged man. He acts as an innocent baby when acts with Roger in the cartoons (being voiced by April Winchell as an infant).
- Toon Patrol: Five weasels who act as the Toontown police force, working under the orders of Judge Doom. They also appear in the Roger Rabbit's Car Toon Spin attraction. The characters are based on the weasels from the film The Adventures of Ichabod and Mr. Toad.
  - Smart Ass (voiced by David Lander): Leader of the Toon Patrol, and Judge Doom's right-hand man. He is the only one with constant dialogue in the film, unlike his companions, who only have brief phrases.
  - Greasy (voiced by Charles Fleischer): A weasel notable for wearing a 1930s-style green suit.
  - Psycho (voiced by Charles Fleischer): A weasel who has bulging eyes, spiky hair, and wearing a straitjacket.
  - Stupid (voiced by Fred Newman): A weasel who stands out for being obese, and wearing children's clothing such as a striped T-shirt, sneakers, and a hat with a propeller.
  - Wheezy (voiced by June Foray): A weasel who stands out for being blue-gray (unlike his companions who are brown) and constantly smoking cigarettes that cause him to be surrounded by smoke.
- Benny the Cab (voiced by Charles Fleischer): An anthropomorphic taxi cab that was imprisoned by the Toon Patrol until freed by Roger and Eddie, whom he helps escape from the weasels. He also appears in the Roger Rabbit's Car Toon Spin attraction as the vehicle used by Roger to rescue Jessica. Benny also has cameo appearances in the House of Mouse television series episodes "Max's New Car" and "Mickey vs. Shelby".
- Mrs. Herman (voiced by Amy Irving): Baby Herman's "mother" in the cartoons starring Roger. She is seen only from the waist down.
- Bongo the Gorilla (voiced by Morgan Deare in the film and Jeff Bergman in Roger Rabbit's Car Toon Spin): A big gorilla and the bouncer of The Ink and Paint Club.
- Lenny the Cab: Benny's "twin cousin", who appears in the Roger Rabbit's Car Toon Spin attraction as the ride vehicle used by the guests.

Additionally, Droopy, a character from MGM cartoons, makes cameo appearances in both the film (voiced by Richard Williams) and the three short films (voiced again by Williams in Tummy Trouble, and by Corey Burton in the other two).

=== Other humans ===
- Dolores (played by Joanna Cassidy): Eddie's girlfriend. She works as a waitress at a bar, where she helps Eddie hide Roger. Later, after the incident between Roger and Doom at the bar, she mentions that her boss fired her.
- Marvin Acme (played by Stubby Kaye): The wisecracking owner of the Acme Factory and Toontown, who is killed after a safe falls on his head. At the climax of the film, it is discovered that in his will he leaves the Toons as the owners of his property.
- R.K. Maroon (played by Alan Tilvern): Owner of Maroon Cartoons and Roger's boss. He hires Eddie to find out about Jessica's infidelities. Later, Eddie discovers that it was all a planned ploy, but when Maroon is about to tell him the whole truth, he is killed by being shot by Judge Doom.
- Lieutenant Santino (played by Richard LeParmentier): Police lieutenant and friend of Eddie, whom he takes to the Acme Factory to show him the scene of Marvin Acme's murder. At the climax of the film, he meets Eddie again at the Acme Factory, where Eddie reveals to him Doom's acts on the case.
- Angelo (played by Richard Ridings): A patron at the bar where Dolores works, who mocks Eddie's job as a detective on toon cases. Although later, he ends up covering up Roger's presence at the bar when Judge Doom looks for him.
- Teddy Valiant: Eddie's deceased brother, with whom he worked as a private detective, until he was killed by a toon who dropped a piano on his head during a case.
- Raoul J. Raoul (played by Joel Silver in the film and Sol Pavlosky in Tummy Trouble): Director of Roger's films, who ends up enraged due to Roger's clumsiness when it comes to acting.

== Video games ==
- The Bugs Bunny Crazy Castle – Released in 1989, featured on the Japanese FDS version under the title Roger Rabbit.
- Who Framed Roger Rabbit – Released in 1988 for MS-DOS, Amiga, Atari ST, Apple II and Commodore 64 by Buena Vista Software.
- Who Framed Roger Rabbit – Released in 1989 for Nintendo Entertainment System by LJN.
- Hare Raising Havoc – Released in 1991 for Amiga and MS-DOS by BlueSky Software.
- Who Framed Roger Rabbit – Released in 1991 for Game Boy by Capcom.

== Comic books ==
=== Roger Rabbit ===
Roger Rabbit is a comic book series by Disney Comics starring characters from the 1988 film, Who Framed Roger Rabbit, as well as following continuity from the film. It spawned a spin-off series entitled Roger Rabbit's Toontown, which lasted five issues.

The series continues the adventures of Roger Rabbit, who has since returned to working for Maroon Cartoons, now under C.B. Maroon (a character introduced in the graphic novel, Roger Rabbit: The Resurrection of Doom). The comics are usually split into two stories, with one main feature focusing on Roger's adventures, and a back-up feature presented to look like an actual animated subject.

While characters such as Jessica Rabbit, Baby Herman and Benny the Cab all appear in the stories, Eddie Valiant is seldom seen, replaced by a new detective character named Rick Flint. It is explained that when Roger went to Eddie with a new case, Eddie was too busy with new cases brought on by his new-found fame after defeating Judge Doom twice. Eddie then refers Roger to a "new kid" private detective, Rick Flint. The actual editorial reason for omitting Eddie Valiant from the comic was not having the likeness rights to make Eddie resemble Bob Hoskins. Two other new characters introduced were Lenny, a toon plane who is Benny's cousin, and Mel, who is Roger's sentient mailbox.

The series had a one-off 3D strip as part of the Disney's Comics in 3-D series, which reprints the back-up features of earlier comics and converted them into 3D. The comic-book line lasted 18 issues, and continued until the implosion of Disney Comics.

=== Roger Rabbit's Toontown ===
Roger Rabbit's Toontown was a comic book published by Disney Comics. It features Roger and his supporting characters from Touchstone and Amblin Entertainment's Who Framed Roger Rabbit. Every issue began with a Roger Rabbit story and his supporting characters such as his wife Jessica, his co star Baby and his taxi cab friend Benny round out the comic. This comic book lasted for five issues from May to August 1991.

This comic book is similar to the Roger Rabbit version of Walt Disney's Comics and Stories.

=== Graphic novels and trade paperbacks ===
- Who Framed Roger Rabbit (based on the movie)
- Roger Rabbit: Tummy Trouble (based on the animated short)
- Roger Rabbit: Who Framed Rick Flint (trade paperback featuring a story line from the Roger Rabbit comic series) ISBN 0-307-21803-1

==== Roger Rabbit: The Resurrection of Doom ====
Roger Rabbit: The Resurrection of Doom (ISBN 0-871-35593-0) is a graphic novel sequel that takes place between the film Who Framed Roger Rabbit and the Roger Rabbit short film Tummy Trouble. It also helped to set the scene for the Roger Rabbit comic-book series by Disney Comics.

===== Plot summary =====
The comic opens with a documentary about the origin of Judge Doom. The documentary mentions the original character cel used to create Doom. Eddie Valiant is given credit for ending Doom's reign of terror by dissolving him in a puddle of Dip, stated as 'A victim of his own evil creation', and putting a stop to his plans to erase Toontown and build a freeway where it would have once stood.

A weasel, Slimy, is shown watching the documentary. He goes with two other weasels, Flasher and Ragtag, to find the original cel of Doom. They manipulate some animators to bring Doom back to life. With time, Doom remembers everything that happened to him, and now wants revenge against both Eddie Valiant and Roger Rabbit for ruining his plans.

Meanwhile, Eddie Valiant is called by C.B. Maroon, the late R.K. Maroon’s brother and new executive of Maroon Cartoons, who announces they are reopening the studio, and pays Valiant $500 to run a search on the background of Roger Rabbit. Valiant finds Roger's records clean as a whistle.

Meanwhile, Roger and Jessica Rabbit are enjoying life at home as much as possible, despite Roger's unemployment following the closing of Maroon Cartoon Studios. Roger gets a call from Maroon Cartoons, saying they are reopening the studio, and that they want Roger to come work for them. Roger accepts the offer, and the next day, Roger meets C.B. Maroon, who starts Roger off with a very low-budget film (depicted in a Hanna-Barbera-esque style). Roger angrily objects to his part in the film, and is fired ("Get me that other rabbit with the tiger for a buddy!").

The next day, Roger finds dozens of scandalous, untrue headlines centered on himself. He turns to Valiant to find out why this is happening. Valiant first meets with C.B. Maroon, and questions him about firing Roger. Maroon reveals himself as Doom, tells his plan to ruin Roger's reputation and then kill him. He and the weasels knock Valiant out and lock him up in a storage locker, where Valiant meets the real C.B. Maroon. Doom, as C.B. Maroon, puts Maroon Studios up for auction, and the studio will be officially sold at noon.

Meanwhile, Roger and Jessica are about to leave for Simi Valley, but first go to Valiant's office to say goodbye, only to find the office ransacked. Jessica finds indentations of the address Valiant wrote on the last piece of paper he used. Rushing to the address, they find and rescue Eddie Valiant and C.B. Maroon. They leave to save Maroon Studios. Valiant sprays him and his weasels with the Dip-filled gag squirt gun, and before dissolving, "Maroon" reveals himself to be Doom.

The real C.B. Maroon announces he is re-opening Maroon Cartoon Studios, and will be providing all the toon employees with work, including Roger Rabbit and Baby Herman with a line-up of new animated short films, starting with Tummy Trouble.

== Attractions ==
=== Mickey's Toontown ===
Mickey's Toontown is a themed land located at Disneyland and Tokyo Disneyland (in this last being simply named Toontown), which is inspired on the city of Toontown from the film Who Framed Roger Rabbit. A similar land also existed at the Magic Kingdom under the name Mickey's Toontown Fair, until it was closed in 2011.

=== Roger Rabbit's Car Toon Spin ===
Roger Rabbit's Car Toon Spin is a dark ride based on Who Framed Roger Rabbit. The first version opened at Disneyland on January 26, 1994, while another version at Tokyo Disneyland was opened on April 15, 1996.
