= Who Framed Roger Rabbit (1989 video game) =

- Developer: Rare
- Publisher: LJN
- Designer: Tim Stamper
- Artist: Kev Bayliss
- Composer: David Wise
- Platform: Nintendo Entertainment System
- Release: NA: September 1989
- Genre: Action-adventure
- Mode: Single-player

Who Framed Roger Rabbit is a 1989 action-adventure video game developed by Rare and published by LJN for the Nintendo Entertainment System. It is loosely based on the 1988 film of the same name, and combines elements of graphic adventure computer games with some more traditional action-adventure gameplay. A different version of the game had been released for various computer systems in 1988.

== Gameplay ==
The player controls private detective Eddie Valiant, who is always closely followed by Roger Rabbit. The object of the game is to find all four pieces of Marvin Acme's lost will and defeat Judge Doom. Along the way there are several clues and items which must be found in order to progress. The game begins in Downtown Los Angeles, but as the game progresses, the player can travel to more areas (connected by tunnels) including the outskirts of Los Angeles and eventually Toontown itself in order to widen the search. Once all four pieces of the will are found, Eddie must find Doom to confront and finally defeat him.

Eddie Valiant faces Judge Doom, the final (and only) boss of the game

The gameplay switches between side-scrolling areas (used when searching areas such as buildings and caves) and an overhead view (used for exploring the streets and general overworld). In the overworld, the player must go building to building in order to search them for items and clues. Benny the Cab can be found or summoned for faster travel on the roads, but the player must exit the vehicle in order to enter buildings or to explore the forested areas off the paved roads containing caves which must also be searched for items. Hazards on the overworld include cars and enemies such as birds which attempt to carry off Roger (which will cause the player to lose a life). Judge Doom also has Weasel patrols in the streets in search of Eddie and Roger, and if captured the player must solve a riddle in order to escape.

In the side scrolling sections, the player must search buildings, rooms, shops and the various caves to find the items and clues. During these segments the player can talk to the various people met along the way, who can give clues and inform the player if a building contains any useful items or if it is empty. The NPC's include random citizens along characters from the film including Jessica Rabbit. The player must also search desks, tables and even trash cans which contain items. Various enemies also roam these areas. To fight them, Eddie's main attack is punching (which can be charged up) along with various weapons found and purchased.

Items the player finds along the way include weapons such as bricks, exploding cigars and "six shooters." Meat, fishbones, baseballs and rattles distract certain enemies which cannot be killed. Other items include wallets (used for purchasing items at the shops), crowbars (as both a weapon and to open locked doors), and explosives (used for destroying blockades on the road). Shops can be entered like any other building, and contain one item for sale at a time (but these can be cycled through by entering and exiting the shop repeatedly). The location of most items are random meaning that no play through will be exactly the same, and thus forcing the player to explore and search all areas.

=== Jessica Rabbit's phone number ===
One of the Los Angeles locations that the player can visit is the Ink and Paint Club, where Roger's wife Jessica is performing. She offers hints as to where to find pieces of the will, and a real telephone number can be found by searching the tables. When the game was originally released, players could call the toll free number and hear a recorded message from Jessica giving additional tips on gameplay (particularly on how to distract enemies with specific items). The hotline was disconnected less than a year after the game's release and has since been reassigned multiple times (including at one point being a sex hotline).

== Plot ==
The game takes place in Los Angeles in 1947, and loosely follows the same plot of the movie it is based on.

Roger Rabbit has been wrongly accused of murdering Marvin Acme, and it is up to Private Detective Eddie Valiant to prove his innocence. Starting in Eddie's office, the two go off in search of clues across the city. While on their search, the two encounter many hazards but with the help of Jessica and others met along the way, Eddie locates all four pieces of the Acme will and clears Roger's name.

Before his job is complete, Eddie heads off to Toontown to confront Judge Doom, a corrupt politician who uses a chemical known as "Dip" to kill Toons. Eddie finds Doom in a warehouse, attempting to lower a captured Roger and Jessica into the Dip. Eddie fights Doom, and eventually manages to knock him out (and revealing Doom is also a Toon). Eddie in turn takes the Dip and uses it to kill Doom and rescues Roger and Jessica.

The game's end screen consists of the following text:

TOONTOWN IS SAVED AND

REMAINS IN THE HANDS OF

ITS RIGHTFUL OWNERS, THE TOONS

THE END

== See also ==
- Who Framed Roger Rabbit (1988 video game)
- Who Framed Roger Rabbit (1991 video game)
- Crazy Castle series
