= Who Framed Roger Rabbit (1991 video game) =

- North American cover art
- Developer: Capcom
- Publisher: Capcom
- Designer: Shinji Mikami
- Composer: Yasuaki Fujita
- Series: Who Framed Roger Rabbit
- Platform: Game Boy
- Release: NA: November 1991; EU: 1991
- Genre: Adventure
- Mode: Single-player

Who Framed Roger Rabbit is a 1991 adventure game by Capcom for the Game Boy released in North America and Europe. Based on the 1988 film of the same title, it is one of the earliest games designed by Shinji Mikami.

== Plot ==
Roger is summoned by Marvin Acme to his factory to take his deed and get his will from Jessica Rabbit to save Toontown from the greedy Judge Doom, who is going to use a machine filled with dip to obliterate Toontown. Immediately after, Marvin is shot through his office window and killed. As Roger meets Jessica she is kidnapped by both Doom's weasel henchmen. Roger gets help from Eddie Valiant. Through his investigation Roger faces Stupid, Sleazy, Greasy, Psycho, and Smart Ass (censored as Smarty in the game) and finally makes it to Doom's mansion. They make it past the complex and confront Doom, defeating him and destroying the machine.

== Gameplay ==
The player controls Roger Rabbit around Toontown to solve objectives to save Toontown and defeat Judge Doom. Roger simply interacts with objects and characters. There are collectible items Roger needs to access certain places and make progress. Toontown has many buildings around the outdoor area which the player can enter. To defeat enemies, the player needs to procure a weapon. Roger has three heart points, that deplete when he takes damage. The player can regain health by collecting carrots. Scattered in the game are traps and ambushing weasels waiting to hurt Roger. The game is over if all his health is gone. The game features a password system.
