= The Universe According to Virgil Reality =

1996 video game

- Developer: 7th Level
- Publisher: 7th Level
- Release: 1996

The Universe According to Virgil Reality is a 1996 video game from 7th Level. The game is for children 8 and up.

== Gameplay ==
The Universe According to Virgil Reality is an educational CD-ROM which blends science education with humor and animation, featuring Dr. Virgil Reality, a quirky animated professor. Players explore scientific concepts through interactive animations, experiments, and activities. The game covers topics like physics, biology, and chemistry, using engaging storytelling and humor. Dr. Virgil Reality and his sidekick Cube guide players through a series of floating pods, each containing different scientific lessons. The game includes interactive microscopes, video footage of historical scientific events, and printable experiments for hands-on learning. The animation style was inspired by classic cartoons, making the experience fun and accessible for both kids and adults. It was designed to make science entertaining, using Hollywood-style animation and voice acting to bring complex topics to life.

== Development ==
The game was first mentioned in May 1994 when 7th Level announced today that Charles Fleischer (voice of Roger Rabbit) had signed an agreement to help create, write and narrate the game. The title was originally scheduled to be released in late 1994. This was pushed to November 1995 and finally to 1996.

7th Level invested roughly a million dollars in the project.

== Reception ==
Reception

Review scores
Publication	Score
All Game Guide	3/5
Herald Sun	9/10
New York Daily News	2/5/4

New York Daily News gave the game a score of 2.5 out of 4, stating "Developed by a group of respected scientists and doctors worthy of the Manhattan Project, junior chemistry enthusiasts endeared by puzzles will find hours of enjoyment and a beginner's lesson in chemistry in Dr. Sulfur's world".

The game needed to sell about 50,000 copies to break even.
