= Who Censored Roger Rabbit? =

1981 novel by Gary K. Wolf

- First edition cover, with Gary K. Wolf as Eddie Valiant
- Author: Gary K. Wolf
- Language: English
- Genre: Mystery novel
- Publisher: St. Martin's Press
- Publication date: June 6, 1981; 45 years ago
- Publication place: United States
- Media type: Print (Paperback)
- Pages: 226 pp (paperback edition)
- ISBN: 0-312-87001-9 (paperback edition)
- OCLC: 7573568
- Dewey Decimal: 813/.54 19
- LC Class: PS3573.O483 W5
- Followed by: Who P-P-P-Plugged Roger Rabbit?

Who Censored Roger Rabbit? is a fantasy mystery novel written by Gary K. Wolf and published in 1981. It was later adapted by Touchstone Pictures and Amblin Entertainment into the 1988 film Who Framed Roger Rabbit.

== Plot ==
Eddie Valiant is a hardboiled private eye, and Roger Rabbit is a second banana comic strip character. One day, Roger hires Valiant to find out why his employers, the DeGreasy Brothers (Rocco and Dominick), who are owners of a cartoon syndicate, have reneged on a promise to give Roger his own strip and potentially sell his contract to a mystery buyer. Roger pays Eddie a big retainer so Eddie interviews Roger's acquaintances to work the retainer off. Eddie comes to the conclusion that there was no mystery buyer and the reason Roger Rabbit remained in a secondary role was because of his lack of talent, and that, therefore, Roger has no case. Soon after, Roger is mysteriously murdered in his home. His speech balloon, found at the crime scene, indicates his murder was a way of "censoring" him; apparently, he had just heard someone explain the source of his success. Valiant's search for the killer takes him to a variety of suspects, which includes Roger's estranged widow Jessica Rabbit, Roger's former co-star Baby Herman, and Roger's photographer Carol Masters. Valiant then meets a doppelgänger of Roger's and promises to solve the mystery of his death. At the same time, Roger's former boss, Rocco, is also murdered, and witnesses point to Roger as the killer, as he was allegedly seen fleeing the scene of the crime.

While Valiant investigates, the key suspects ask him to be on the lookout for a certain kettle in exchange for a reward. He eventually finds the kettle, which was in Roger's possession, and gives it to Dominick only to find it is actually a magic lamp with a Genie living on the inside, who then kills Dominick. The Genie explains its origins: over thousands of years, it has become embittered, now only granting wishes with a catch. He admits to being the one who shot Roger, explaining that the words to command are part of a children's song that Roger habitually sang, so Roger wished for success without actually realizing he had done so. When Roger accidentally activated the lantern a third time, but witnessed the apparition, the Genie killed him. Valiant holds the Genie hostage over a saltwater fish tank, saltwater being his weakness. The Genie is then forced to grant a wish made by Valiant for proof of Roger's innocence, which is provided in the form of a suicide note from Dominick confessing to both Roger and Rocco's murders. Not trusting the Genie to keep his word of letting him go, and also knowing that no one would believe him about the Genie, Valiant drops the Genie's lamp into the fish tank, and the saltwater dissolves the Genie, for Rocco & Dominick are born as Imps in the first place.

With Roger's murderer disposed of, Valiant concludes that Rocco's murderer was the original Roger Rabbit himself. Roger's motive was that Rocco had stolen Jessica from him, and he generated the doppelgänger to be an alibi. He intended to plant the murder weapon at Valiant's office, framing him, but was shot by the Genie when he accidentally summoned it. The doppelgänger confirms the truth and confesses that he "had it planned for days". However, for clearing his name and befriending him despite what he did and tried to do afterwards, he praises Valiant for his morals (calling him "a real stand-up guy"). Doppelgänger-Roger gives Valiant a final heartfelt goodbye before disintegrating.

== Edition differences ==
The different covers used for the book give different impressions. The first is darker in tone and only shows a shadowed Roger from the back, while Valiant's face is unshaven. It focused on the two in a close-up with a black background. A later edition showed a cleanshaven Valiant while Roger's face was brightly shown. It was panned out and showed the city during day in the background. It also showed a speech bubble coming from Roger saying "Help! I'm stuck in a mystery of double-crossers, steamy broads, and killer cream pies." Both show author Gary K. Wolf modelling as Valiant.

== Comparison to the film adaptation ==
The book and film feature many of the same core characters; however, the plot and many other elements of the film depart significantly from Wolf's novel.

The novel is set in the 1980s of the book's publication, albeit in a strange universe in which real humans and cartoon characters co-exist. The cartoons of the novel are primarily comic strip characters, as opposed to animated cartoon stars. Many famous strip characters are mentioned or make cameo appearances, such as Blondie and Dagwood Bumstead, Dick Tracy, Snoopy, Beetle Bailey, Hägar the Horrible, and Garfield. Strips are produced by photographing cartoon characters. In this version, "toon" characters speak in word balloons which appear above their heads as they talk. Although some characters have learned to suppress their word balloons and speak vocally, the use of word balloons forms several important plot points.

In the book, toons have the power to create duplicates of themselves as stunt doubles for risky shots. Generally, they disintegrate after a few minutes or hours at the most. Roger creates one that lasts two days, although this is an exception, intending it to be as close a match to him as possible in order to be an alibi. When Roger is shot and killed by an unknown assailant, his doppelgänger works with the detective to solve his murder before he disintegrates. In the film, toons are more or less unkillable—except by noxious chemical "dip"—and, with a few exceptions, shrug off even the worst injuries, while their slapstick can realistically kill humans, such as Judge Doom killing Teddy Valiant (Eddie's younger brother in the film) with a piano.

The only lines of dialogue from the book that were closely re-used in the film were spoken by Baby Herman ("I've got a 50-year-old lust and a 3-year-old dinky;" however, in the book, Baby Herman's actual age is given as 36) and Jessica Rabbit ("I'm not bad, Mr. Valiant. I'm just drawn that way").

== Comparison to the spin-off ==
In 1991, Wolf wrote another Roger Rabbit book, Who P-P-P-Plugged Roger Rabbit?. However, in the form of a memo from Valiant, the book says that Roger Rabbit "and his screwball buddies play fast and loose with historical accuracy;" this means that the stories do not have much continuity between each other. The previous book is retconned as a dream Jessica had.
