= Charles Fleischer =

American actor (born 1950)

- Fleischer at GalaxyCon San Jose in 2026
- Born: August 27, 1950 (age 76); Washington, D.C., U.S.
- Other name: Charlie Fleischer
- Education: Long Island University
- Occupations: Actor; stand-up comedian; musician; writer
- Years active: 1972–present
- Spouse: Sheryl Strassman (m. 1977; div. 2006)
- Children: 2

Charles Fleischer (born August 27, 1950) is an American actor, stand-up comedian, musician, and writer, best known for his recurring role as Carvelli in Welcome Back, Kotter, and for appearing in films such as Who Framed Roger Rabbit, A Nightmare on Elm Street, The Polar Express, Rango, Chip 'n Dale: Rescue Rangers, and We're Back! A Dinosaur's Story. He made a cameo in Back to the Future Part II and also reprised the role of Roger Rabbit in the Roger Rabbit theatrical shorts. After beginning his career on the comedy club circuit, Charles Fleischer's first big break in comedy television came when he made an appearance on Rowan & Martin's Laugh-In.

== Early life ==
Fleischer was born in Washington, D.C., on August 27, 1950. He studied medicine at Stony Brook Southampton, then part of Long Island University, before transferring to study acting at Goodman School of Drama at the Art Institute of Chicago (now at DePaul University).

== Career ==
Fleischer began performing stand up comedy as a child. His first appearance was at Camp Kewanee in Pennsylvania, at the age of nine. After studying at Southampton College and training as an actor at Chicago's Goodman Theatre, he moved to Los Angeles in 1970 to pursue a career in comedy. In the 1970s he became a regular on the Los Angels comedy circuit, appearing on programmes including Rowan & Martin's Laugh-In, The Tonight Show Starring Johnny Carson and the comedy series Keep On Truckin'.

Fleischer is best known as the voices of Roger Rabbit, Benny the Cab, Greasy, and Psycho in Who Framed Roger Rabbit. After the film's success, he continued to perform the voice of Roger in several Disney television and theme park appearances at several of the Walt Disney Parks and Resorts, and in three follow-up shorts. Other voice roles for Fleischer include The Polar Express and We're Back! A Dinosaur's Story. Notable on-screen roles include Back to the Future Part II and Gridlock'd.

Fleischer had a recurring role on the 1970s TV series Welcome Back, Kotter as Carvelli, as Chuck on the ABC series Laverne & Shirley, and on the Disney cartoon series House of Mouse as the voice of Benny the Cab. Fleischer's first Laugh-In appearance was on January 15, 1973, where he played his homemade musical instruments made from lead pipe and shower wands. He then landed a spot on The Tonight Show Starring Johnny Carson on May 15, 1974. He was also a regular on Keep on Truckin'. He guest-starred on The Weird Al Show as a guy in a band. He also appeared on the short-lived Saturday morning show, Wacko.

Fleischer is the originator of the quote "If you remember the '60s, you really weren't there", which has been widely mis-attributed to various other celebrities.

He performed the role of a televangelist on "What God Wants, Part II", on Roger Waters' 1992 album Amused to Death.

He is also a musician and songwriter. He performed as a guest on harmonica with the group Blues Traveler at the Wiltern Theater in Los Angeles on November 22, 1995 and from December 10 to 15, 2002 at the Improvisational theatre of Connecticut Avenue.

From December 2010 to September 2011, he hosted his own weekly web show Fleischer's Universe on Ustream.tv, produced by Brad Wyman.

Fleischer appeared at Tropicana Las Vegas, giving an improvised comedy along with Bob Golub and Nick Aragon at the Laugh Factory from January 17 to 20, 2019.

== Personal life ==
Fleischer married Sheryl Strassman in 1977 and divorced in 2006. Together they have two daughters.

== Filmography ==
=== Films and television ===
- Barney Miller (1975) as Floyd Spears (credited)
- The Death of Richie (1977) as Brick (credited)
- One on One (1977) as High School Student (uncredited)
- Crisis in Sun Valley (1978) as Shuyler
- Sugar Time! (1978) as Lightning Jack Rappaport
- Die Laughing (1980) as Charlie
- Hill Street Blues (1981) as Malibu
- The Hand (1981) as David Maddow
- Night Shift (1982) as Prisoner
- A Nightmare on Elm Street (1984) as Dr. King
- The House of God (1984) as Hyper Hooper
- Deadly Friend (1986) as BB (voice)
- Bad Dreams (1988) as Ron the Pharmacist
- Who Framed Roger Rabbit (1988) as Roger Rabbit / Benny the Cab / Greasy / Psycho (voice)
- Mickey's 60th Birthday (1988) (live-action & voice) as Stagehand Charlie / Roger Rabbit (voice)
- Tummy Trouble (1989) as Roger Rabbit (voice)
- Gross Anatomy (1989)
- Back to the Future Part II (1989) as Terry
- Dick Tracy (1990) as Reporter
- Roller Coaster Rabbit (1990) as Roger Rabbit (voice)
- Straight Talk (1992) as Tony
- Carry On Columbus (1992) as Pontiac
- Trail Mix-Up (1993) as Roger Rabbit (voice)
- We're Back! A Dinosaur's Story (1993) as Dweeb (voice)
- Partners (1993) as Evan Crow
- My Girl 2 (1994) as Cab Driver
- Demon Knight (1995) as Wally Enfield
- Bone Chillers (1996) as Arnie
- Gridlock'd (1997) as Mr. Woodson
- Ground Control (1998) as Randy
- Permanent Midnight (1998) as Allen from Mr. Chompers
- Rusty: A Dog's Tale (1998) as Bart Bimini
- Genius (1999) as Dr. Krickstein
- Big Monster on Campus (2000) as Mr. Stockton
- Bel Air (2000) as Gus
- G-Men from Hell (2000) as Martin / Pete
- Buzz Lightyear of Star Command (2000) as Monumentus (voice)
- House of Mouse (2001) as Benny the Cab (voice)
- Balto II: Wolf Quest (2002) as Boris (voice)
- The Backlot Murders (2002) as Henry
- The 4th Tenor (2002) as Alphonse
- Pauly Shore Is Dead (2003) as Himself (uncredited)
- Balto III: Wings of Change (2004) as Boris / White Mountain Postmaster (voice)
- The Polar Express (2004) as Elf General (voice)
- Big Kiss (2004) as Berezovich
- Zodiac (2007) as Bob Vaughn
- Funny People (2009) as Himself
- Chain Letter (2009) as Frank Wiggins
- Rango (2011) as Elbows (voice)
- Negative Space (2011) as Harry
- Reality Queen! (2016) as Talk Show Host
- Hanukkah (2019) as Amon Feist
- Prop Culture (2020) as Himself, Episode: "Who Framed Roger Rabbit"
- Chip 'n Dale: Rescue Rangers (2022) as Roger Rabbit / Chipmunks TV Announcer (voice)

=== Video games and applications ===
- The Universe According to Virgil Reality (1996)
- The Walt Disney World Explorer (1996 and 1998) as Walt Disney World Quiz Challenge Host

== Publications ==
- "Can Sequentially Linked Gamma-Ray Bursts Nullify Randomness?" (2012), paper submitted to Cornell University
