= Eddie Valiant =

Fictional character

- Who Censored Roger Rabbit? / Who Framed Roger Rabbit character
- Bob Hoskins as Eddie Valiant in Who Framed Roger Rabbit (1988)
- First appearance: Who Censored Roger Rabbit? (1981)
- Created by: Gary K. Wolf
- Based on: Noir actors from the 1940s
- Adapted by: Jeffrey Price; Peter S. Seaman
- Portrayed by: Gary K. Wolf (cover of Who Censored Roger Rabbit?); Bob Hoskins (Who Framed Roger Rabbit)
- Voiced by: Corey Burton (Who Framed Roger Rabbit Read-Along Storybook)

In-universe information
- Alias: Edward Valiant
- Species: Human
- Gender: Male
- Occupation: Detective, private investigator
- Family: Unnamed father Theodore J. "Teddy" Valiant (deceased younger brother)
- Significant other: Dolores (girlfriend)

Eddie Valiant is a fictional character and the protagonist of the novel Who Censored Roger Rabbit?, and the film adaptation, Who Framed Roger Rabbit.

== Who Censored Roger Rabbit? ==
In the original novel Who Censored Roger Rabbit?, Eddie Valiant is a fictional Los Angeles–based private detective hired by comic book star Roger Rabbit to investigate the workings of Roger's corrupt employers, the DeGreasy Brothers. When Roger is found dead, and his final words having been censored out, Valiant is soon sent on the case of tracking Roger's murderers. This original incarnation of Eddie is a heavy smoker and has a beard as well having more muscular and chiseled features than as appear in the film.

== Who Framed Roger Rabbit ==
The 1988 film gives insight into the character, as portrayed by Bob Hoskins. Pictures and newspaper clippings in his office reveal that he and his younger brother Theodore ("Teddy" for short) were sons of a circus clown; they joined the police force in 1925 and started their own private investigation service in 1938. The brothers quickly established a reputation for rescuing Toons in trouble, such as solving the kidnapping of Donald Duck's nephews and clearing Goofy of espionage charges. In 1942, while they were investigating a robbery in Toontown, an unknown bank robber (later revealed to be Judge Doom) dropped a piano on them from fifteen stories up. Eddie survived but broke his arm; however, Teddy was killed instantly. Barring a few exceptions, the tragedy left Eddie with a distaste for Toons in general; his business collapsed, losing the respect of most of the police force, he became an alcoholic, causing his relationship with his former girlfriend to deteriorate, suffering from PTSD and depression. Eddie began living in the office he and Teddy had shared and left Teddy's desk as a memorial to him, refusing to dust it or let anyone sit in his chair.

Five years later, R.K. Maroon, head of the Maroon Cartoons studio, hires Valiant to photograph Jessica Rabbit, Roger's wife; she is literally "playing pattycake" with Marvin Acme, owner of Toontown and founder of the Acme Corporation. When Acme is murdered and Roger becomes the prime suspect, Valiant teams up with Roger to expose the culprit. Maroon is subsequently killed, and Valiant discovers that Doom is responsible for not only these two deaths, but Teddy's as well. He destroys Doom at Acme's warehouse, finds Acme's lost will that bequeaths Toontown to the Toons, and lives happily-ever-after, having avenged his brother's death and rid himself of both his bigotry and alcoholism.

== Appearances in other media ==
In the graphic novel of the film published in 1989 by Marvel Comics, Valiant is the narrator of the story, telling the film through his eyes and in the style of a detective story. According to Roger Rabbit: The Resurrection of Doom, Valiant eats jellybeans to cope with his new-found teetotalism. In the novel Who P-P-P-Plugged Roger Rabbit?, Valiant has once again vowed to no longer take any Toon cases, but is forced to do so when Baby Herman is found dead.

== Concept and casting ==
Eddie Valiant was portrayed by author Gary K. Wolf on the covers of Who Censored Roger Rabbit? and Who P-P-P-Plugged Roger Rabbit?. Peter Renaday portrayed Eddie in the original test footage from 1983, while animator Mike Gabriel played him in some publicity photographs. Joe Pantoliano portrayed Valiant in a screen test in 1986. Before Hoskins was cast as Valiant for the film, other actors who were considered for the role include Bill Murray, Harrison Ford, Jack Nicholson, Al Pacino, Clint Eastwood, Eddie Murphy, Robin Williams, Robert Redford, Ed Harris, Don Lane, Chevy Chase and Edward James Olmos.
