= Roger Rabbit =

Fictional book and film character

- Who Censored Roger Rabbit? and Who Framed Roger Rabbit character
- Roger Rabbit as he appears in Who Framed Roger Rabbit (1988).
- First appearance: Literature: Who Censored Roger Rabbit? (1981); Film: Who Framed Roger Rabbit (1988)
- Created by: Gary K. Wolf
- Adapted by: Jeffrey Price Peter S. Seaman; Richard Williams
- Voiced by: Paul Reubens (1983, screen test); Charles Fleischer (1988−present); Jess Harnell (1991−1998; Disney park appearances, Hare Raising Havoc, Roger Rabbit 2 CGI test footage (singing voice)); Frank Welker (1991; Tiny Toon Adventures); Joe Alaskey (1991; Tiny Toon Adventures); Jim Cummings (1998; Roger Rabbit 2 CGI test footage (speaking voice)); Bob Bergen (2009; Robot Chicken); Jon St. John (2013, Aficionados Chris); Jenn Waitt (2014; Rapid T. Rabbit and Friends)

In-universe information
- Species: Toon rabbit
- Gender: Male
- Occupation: Actor
- Family: Thumper (uncle)
- Spouse: Jessica Krupnick (wife)

Roger Rabbit is a fictional animated anthropomorphic rabbit. The character first appeared in author Gary K. Wolf's 1981 novel, Who Censored Roger Rabbit? In the book, Roger is second banana in a popular comic strip, "Baby Herman". Roger hires private detective Eddie Valiant to investigate why his employers, the DeGreasy Brothers, have reneged on their promise to give Roger his own strip. When Roger is found murdered in his home, Valiant sets out to look for the killer, with the help of Roger's "doppel" (in the book, comic characters can construct physical copies of themselves using their minds that last for only a few days).

The book and character were later re-envisioned in the Touchstone/Amblin's hit 1988 live-action/animated film Who Framed Roger Rabbit. In the film version, Roger is a cartoon character or "toon" living in Hollywood during the Golden age of American animation. The various toons live in a Los Angeles enclave known as "Toontown", and act out animated shorts in the same way human actors act out feature films. After Roger is framed for the murder of a famous Hollywood movie prop and practical joke businessman and the owner of Toontown, Marvin Acme, he seeks out Valiant to help clear his name. In the film, the voice of Roger is performed by comedian Charles Fleischer, who was known for wearing a costume of the character on set to get into the role over the entirety of production.

== Background ==
=== Development ===
The character of Roger was created by author Gary K. Wolf, for his 1981 novel Who Censored Roger Rabbit? Wolf was watching Saturday morning cartoons as research for new book ideas, when he noticed cereal commercial mascots such as Tony the Tiger and the Trix Rabbit. Wolf found it amusing that these commercials had real children interacting with cartoon characters casually and without question, and he decided to explore the concept in book form, eventually combining pulp fiction and true crime elements, and eventually creating the character of Roger Rabbit in the process. Published in 1981, Walt Disney Productions purchased the film rights that same year for $35,000. Wolf retains all story rights related to the characters and is allowed to write new novels featuring them, but Disney and Amblin Entertainment own the intellectual property rights.

Before Richard Williams came on board for the film project, early animation tests for Roger gave him a simple and stylized look of a skinny white bunny with a purple nose. In these test animations, Roger was voiced by Paul Reubens. Subscribers to The Disney Channel (which was a subscription channel back in its early years) were able to see this test footage in the early 1980s.

When the film went into full production, Roger was redesigned in a fashion to take elements from all the major cartoon studios of the period, the philosophy behind the new characters, in general, being a combination of Disney's elaborate animation style, similar characterization to Warner Bros. characters and capable of performing Tex Avery-inspired gags. His voice in the film was provided by Charles Fleischer. Before filming, Fleischer was asked to come up with a speech impediment for Roger. He gave Roger a lisp and the stammering catchphrase "P-p-p-please!" as a tribute to all the other famous cartoon characters with speech impediments, which was inspired by Huntz Hall's Sach Jones in The Bowery Boys. He had invented the "cheek flutter" while performing the voice of B.B. in Deadly Friend. His portrayal of Roger was also inspired by Screwy Squirrel. To facilitate Bob Hoskins' performance as Eddie Valiant, Fleischer wore a Roger Rabbit costume on the set to get into the role over the entirety of production, and "stood in" behind camera for most scenes. He called it "trans-projectional acting".

=== Physical appearance ===
"He was almost my height, close to six feet, but only if you counted his eighteen-inch ears. He wore only a baggy pair of shorts, held up by brightly colored suspenders. His shoulders stooped so badly, he had to secure his suspender tops in place with crossed pieces of cellophane tape. For eyes, he had twin black dots, floating in the center of two oblong white saucers. His white stomach, nose, toes, and palms on a light brown body made him resemble someone who had just walked face first into a freshly painted wall."

— Eddie Valiant describing Roger Rabbit in the novel

Roger in the film is a skinny white rabbit with large blue eyes, pink nose, a tuft of red hair who wears red overalls, yellow gloves and a blue bow tie with yellow polka dots. He is an amalgamation of various classic cartoon characters, taking: Mickey Mouse for his gloves; Bugs Bunny for his rabbit form, cheeks included; Br'er Rabbit's feet; Goofy for his baggy overalls; Porky Pig for his bow tie; and Droopy for his head and red hair. Producer Steven Spielberg suggested that Roger's mouth resemble that of Thumper from Bambi, but this idea was ignored. Animator Richard Williams cited Wile E. Coyote as an influence for Roger's expressions, and wanted the character to have ladle-shaped ears, though his animators would sometimes draw Roger with pointy ears similar to Bugs, much to Williams' frustration. He described the process of creating him like an "American flag" with the red overalls, white fur and blue bow tie so that American audiences would enjoy him subliminally.

=== Personality ===
Roger is zany, kind-hearted, humorous, energetic, a bit naïve and not very clever. He loves to make others laugh and is good friends with the other Toons, especially Baby Herman (his Maroon Cartoons costar) and Benny the Cab. He is also nervous and is intimidated by Judge Doom, the Dip, and the Toon Patrol as well as many other hazards.

Despite his traditionally cartoonish behavior, Roger is aware of what most people think of cartoons, facts he's voiced to Eddie Valiant, in that making people laugh is often what makes toons' lives worthwhile, but also notes that there are times when making people laugh is the only weapon toons have. He believes that if someone doesn't have a good sense of humor they're better off dead and gets upset over having to sit through things such as newsreels that he perceives as boring.

He truly loves his voluptuous toon wife, Jessica, and always makes her laugh. Roger doesn't take well to alcoholic beverages. It's shown twice in the film that when he has consumed one, he changes color rapidly, at least one of his eyes swells, his head spins, and he mumbles incoherently at a fast pace, before stretching up into the air and whistling like a steam train at a loud enough tone to shatter glass, all the while spinning around.

== Appearances ==
=== Who Censored Roger Rabbit? (1981) ===
He is a second banana comic strip character who hires gruff alcoholic private eye, Eddie Valiant, to find out why his employers, the owners of a cartoon syndicate called the DeGreasy Brothers, refuse to give him his own comic strip or to sell his contract to another studio. This has Valiant interrogating several suspects, starting with Roger's co-star Baby Herman, then talking to Roger's ex-wife Jessica Rabbit, and finally Roger's photographer Carol. Valiant also goes to the Rabbit's house and finds Roger's corpse lying over the banister, soaking in a pool of his own blood. Toon policeman Captain Cleaver and a human commissioner then show up at the house. Valiant then encounters Roger's doppel, who begs the toon-hating detective to prove his innocence and clear his name.

=== Who Framed Roger Rabbit (1988) ===
In the 1988 Touchstone/Amblin Entertainment film, he is re-envisioned as a character in 1940s animated cartoons and a resident of the fictional Los Angeles enclave, Toontown. He is framed for the murder of Acme Corporation C.E.O. Marvin Acme and seeks out Eddie Valiant to help clear his name.

=== Mickey's 60th Birthday (1988) ===
Roger notably played a significant role in the 1988 NBC special Mickey's 60th Birthday. At the beginning, during the taping of Mickey Mouse's birthday show, he is told to bring Mickey's cake to him, but in the process, he mistakes a stick of dynamite for a candle and puts it on the cake. Upon noticing his mistake, he attempts to blow it out but fails miserably and brings down the set in the process. Due to the resulting explosion, Mickey uses Yen Sid's magic to fix the place up and then shows off some more magic to his audience, only to disappear and have Yen Sid cast a spell on him.

At the end, after the curse is lifted, Roger is the first to find Mickey (at Disneylands Main Street, U.S.A.), takes a selfie of himself and Mickey and is hailed as a hero for doing so on the front page of USA Today.

=== 1990s theatrical shorts ===
Roger was featured in a series of cartoon shorts following the popularity of the movie. These shorts were presented in front of various Touchstone/Disney features in an attempt to revive short subject animation as a part of the movie-going experience. These shorts include Tummy Trouble (1989), released in front of Honey, I Shrunk the Kids (this was also included on the original video release of the film); Roller Coaster Rabbit (1990), shown in front of Dick Tracy; and Trail Mix-Up (1993), shown before A Far Off Place.

Despite being produced by Disney Animation, these shorts contained a heavy slapstick style similar to Warner Bros. Looney Tunes or Tex Avery cartoons, and MGM character Droopy cameos in each one.

=== Tiny Toon Adventures (1992) ===
He makes two cameos voiced by Frank Welker and Joe Alaskey in the show, once with Jessica Rabbit.

- "New Character Day" (1991) - voiced by Frank Welker (as White Rabbit)
- "Buster and Babs Go Hawaiian" (1991) - voiced by Joe Alaskey

=== Who P-P-P-Plugged Roger Rabbit? (1991) ===
Roger is also a character in Wolf's novel, Who P-P-P-Plugged Roger Rabbit?. In the book, Roger Rabbit is sure that Clark Gable has not only stolen the role of Rhett Butler in the soon-to-be-shot Gone with the Wind, but he has also stolen the heart of Jessica. Investigating the affair, Eddie Valiant, Toon protector, finds himself up to his fedora in murder and Hollywood corruption.

The book is neither a sequel nor a prequel to Who Censored Roger Rabbit? or the film adaptation by Touchstone/Amblin. It is a spin-off story with the same characters, just different situations.

=== Aladdin and the King of Thieves (1996) ===
Roger and Jessica both make small cameo appearances.

=== Who Wacked Roger Rabbit (2013) ===
Who Wacked Roger Rabbit? is the third novel in Gary K. Wolf's Roger Rabbit/Toontown series. The story follows private detective Eddie Valiant, who is hired as Gary Cooper's bodyguard while the actor scouts locations in Toontown for his next film, Hi, Toon!, a screwball comedy.

The situation takes an unexpected turn when Cooper's co-star is revealed to be Roger Rabbit, with whom Eddie has little patience. A criminal then threatens to kill Cooper if the film is completed, drawing Eddie, Cooper, Roger, and Jessica Rabbit into a mystery that puts Toontown in danger.

Like P-P-P-Plugged, the novel is separate from the continuity of both the first novel and the 1988 film.

=== Other appearances ===
Roger makes a cameo appearance in the 1987 TV Special Sport Goofy in Soccermania, among the crowd at the soccer game.

Roger occasionally appears as a meet-and-greet costumed character at Disney Parks across the world. A costumed Roger was noticeably present at the opening of Disney-MGM Studios (now Disney's Hollywood Studios) on May 1, 1989.

Roger and company appeared in the 1989 graphic novel, Roger Rabbit: The Resurrection of Doom, by Bob Foster and published by Marvel Comics. In the story, Roger and Jessica are thrown out of work when Maroon Cartoon Studios resorts to cheaper animation. Meanwhile, Judge Doom plots revenge as he makes a most unexpected and surprising return.

Roger also starred in a comic book series published by Disney Comics from April 1990 to September 1991 and a spin-off series called Roger Rabbit's Toontown, published from June to October 1991, which featured Roger in the first story and supporting characters like Jessica Rabbit, Baby Herman, Benny the Cab, and the Toon Patrol. The series continues the adventures of Roger Rabbit, who has since returned to working for Maroon Cartoons, now under C.B. Maroon. The comics were usually split into two stories, with one main feature focusing on Roger's adventures, and a back-up feature presented to look like an actual animated subject. While Jessica Rabbit, Baby Herman and Benny the Cab all appeared in the stories, Eddie Valiant was seldom seen, replaced by a new detective character named Rick Flint. This was given an in-universe explanation in the first issue: Roger had a new case for he and Valiant to team up on, but Valiant told Roger he wouldn't be able to help him, as a result of his heavy workload. So to not leave Roger on his own, Valiant referred him to a "new kid" private detective, Rick Flint. The editorial reason for omitting Valiant from the comic was not having the likeness rights to Bob Hoskins outside of the first issue. Other new characters introduced were Lenny, a toon plane who was Benny's cousin, and Mel, who was Roger's sentient mailbox. The series had a one-off 3D strip as part of the "Disney's Comics in 3-D" series, which reprinted the back-up features of earlier comics and converted them into 3D. The Roger Rabbit comic book line lasted 18 issues, ending at the time of the Disney Comics implosion. However, new stories involving Roger and company continued to appear in the pages of Disney Adventures until after the May 1993 issue.

A parody of Roger appeared in a 2009 episode of the Adult Swim stop-motion sketch comedy series, Robot Chicken (episode: Love, Maurice). In the sketch, Roger (voiced by veteran-Looney Tunes voice actor Bob Bergen) murders O. J. Simpson's ex-wife, Nicole Brown Simpson, in exchange for O. J. killing Roger's wife, Jessica. The sketch satirizes the infamous O. J. Simpson murder case.

Adriel Meka did concept art tests for background characters in Mickey Mouse (2013), including Roger, though he did not appear in the actual series. Roger was also planned to make a cameo appearance in Once Upon a Studio, but was removed due to legal issues between Disney and Amblin Entertainment.

He also makes a cameo appearance in the 2022 film Chip 'n Dale: Rescue Rangers, with Fleischer reprising his role.

== Legacy and pop culture ==
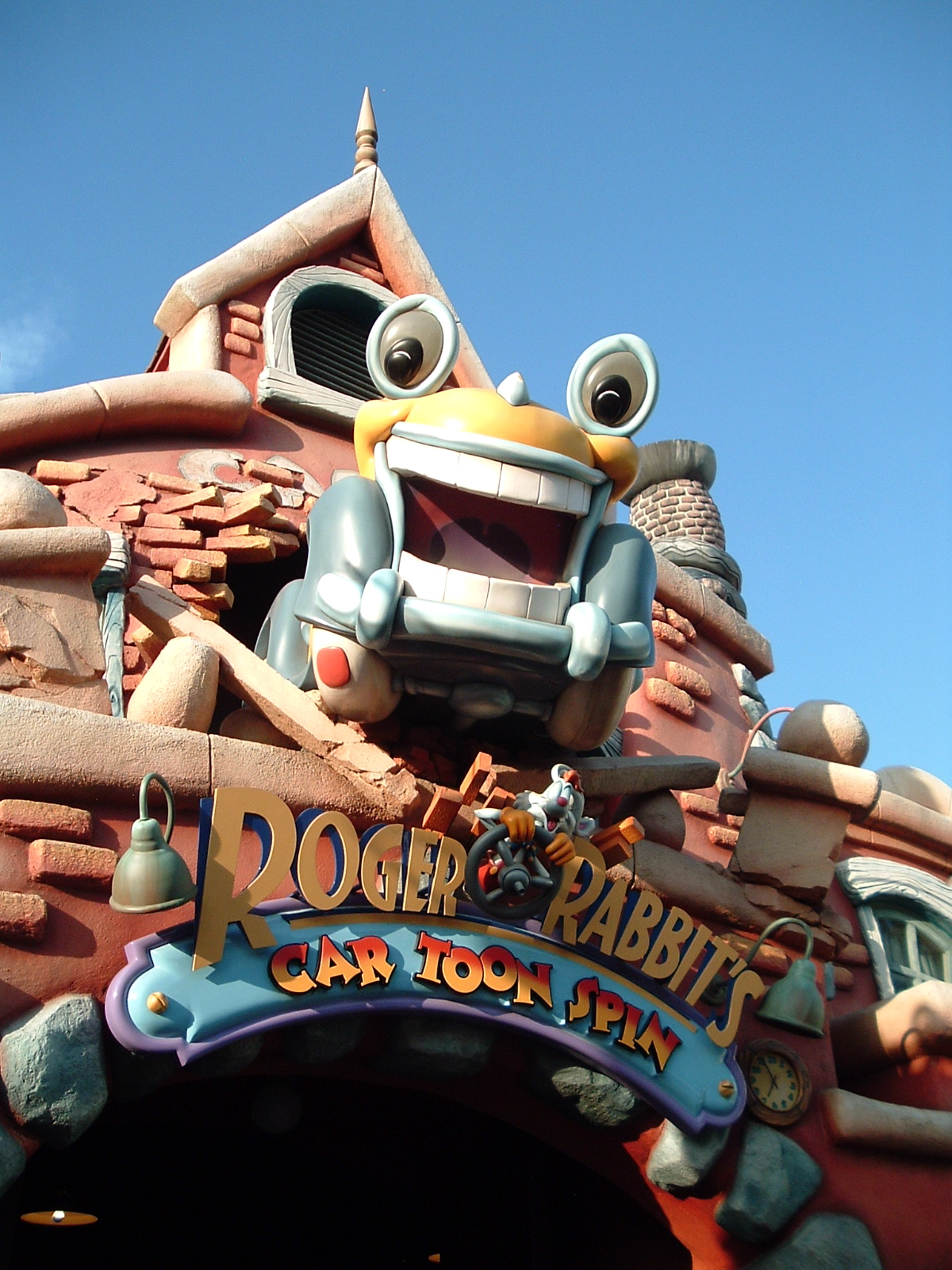
Roger with Benny the Cab, on the marquee of Roger Rabbit's Car Toon Spin at Disneyland California.

Roger Rabbit's Car Toon Spin, a dark ride featuring Roger, opened at Disneyland and Tokyo Disneyland. Roger had also appeared at other Walt Disney Parks and Resorts as a meetable character but retired as of 2018.

Andy Ape from the animated series Darkwing Duck is a parody of Roger.

The Roger Rabbit became a popular fad dance in America during the late 1980s and early 1990s. It was named after the floppy movements of the Roger Rabbit cartoon character. In movement, the Roger Rabbit dance is similar to the running man, but done by skipping backwards with arms performing a flapping gesture as if hooking one's thumbs on suspenders. Bobby Brown popularized the dance move as seen in the music video for his song "Every Little Step" (1989).

The popular Disney Afternoon TV series Bonkers was long rumored to have originally been intended as a Roger Rabbit spin-off series, that ended up being scrapped due to licensing issues from Amblin Entertainment, with Bonkers being created instead. However, in 2008, Greg Weisman, who was a writer and on the series and helped co-created the series, denied this. While confirming that the title character was inspired by Roger, and the Toontown concept had also been influenced by the film, Weisman insists that Bonkers was always meant to be his own character.

Rappers MC Lars and Kool Keith wrote a song about Roger and Judge Doom on Lars's 2015 album, The Zombie Dinosaur LP called "The Dip".

== Additional media ==
- Roger Rabbit in literature
- Roger Rabbit in comic books
- Roger Rabbit in video games
