= Hare Raising Havoc =

1991 video game

- Developer(s): BlueSky Software
- Publisher(s): Disney Software
- Platform(s): Amiga, MS-DOS
- Release: 1991
- Genre(s): Adventure
- Mode(s): Single-player

Hare Raising Havoc is a side-scrolling adventure game developed by BlueSky Software for the Amiga and MS-DOS compatible operating systems. It was published by Disney Software in 1991. The game is a spin-off of the 1988 Disney/Amblin film, Who Framed Roger Rabbit.

== Plot ==
The game follows the same basic pattern of the cartoon at the beginning of Who Framed Roger Rabbit and the subsequent shorts. After opening with a Maroon Cartoons title card, Mrs. Herman explains to Roger that (once again) he is in charge of babysitting Baby Herman, and if he proves incompetent at this task, "he's going back to the science lab!". Roger swears to perform faithfully, but immediately after Mommy's departure, Baby Herman catches sight of the large baby-bottle-shaped sign on top of a local bottling plant. He escapes the house, heading for the plant, so that Roger has to find his way out of the house, and up onto the roof of the plant, before Mommy arrives home and discovers Baby Herman missing. At the end of the game (whether successful or not) Roger must face Mommy and ultimately his director on the cartoon set. Jessica Rabbit makes brief cameos in a couple of the environments.

== Gameplay ==
The player moves Roger around in each room, interacting with objects—for example, turning on a stove, pushing a bouncy cushion to a different position, etc. Once the correct objects are in the correct states they form a convoluted, Rube Goldberg-like method of exiting the room. The game is extremely challenging due to not only the puzzles themselves, but the time limit imposed by Mommy's impending return "one hour" from the start of the game. As a result, the player has much less time to learn the later environments, and a winning game requires almost flawless completion of each room's puzzle. A few hidden power-ups allow the player to turn back the clock a few minutes, but they generally take a little extra time to obtain, so remembering which are actually worth the trouble is crucial.

The game's running speed varies with processor speed. At high speed, the game becomes unplayable, especially when accompanying sound effects prevent Roger's actions from speeding up at the same rate. For this reason, the game provides a setup option to deliberately run the game more slowly.

== See also ==
- List of Disney video games
