= Gary K. Wolf =

American author (born 1941)

- Born: January 24, 1941 (age 85); Earlville, Illinois, U.S.
- Education: University of Illinois at Urbana–Champaign
- Occupation: Author
- Spouse: Bonnie Wolf (m. 1969)
- Writing career
- Years active: 1975–present
- Notable work: The Roger Rabbit series

Gary K. Wolf (born January 24, 1941) is an American author. He is best known as the author of Who Censored Roger Rabbit? (1981), which was loosely adapted into the hit feature-length film Who Framed Roger Rabbit (1988).

== Early life and career ==
Wolf was born on January 24, 1941. He grew up in Earlville, Illinois, the son of Ed and Hattie Wolf. His father owned the town's pool hall and later had an upholstering business, while his mother worked in the school cafeteria. As an only child, Wolf would occupy himself by reading comic books and science fiction stories. Wolf graduated from Earlville High School in June 1959. He later attended the University of Illinois at Urbana–Champaign, where he earned a Bachelor's degree in Advertising and a Master's degree in Communications. He served as an Air Force Captain with the 5th Air Commando Squadron in the Vietnam War, where he won a Bronze Star and two Air Medals.

Wolf and childhood friend John J. Myers, former Catholic Archbishop of Newark, New Jersey, co-wrote a novel named Space Vulture, released by TOR books during 2008. Wolf and co-author Jehane Baptiste have a story named "The UnHardy Boys in Outer Space" in the annual anthology of humorous science fiction, Amityville House of Pancakes Vol 3 (ISBN 1-894-95335-5).

Wolf owns an extensive collection of carousel horses. Because of this, Wolf was featured on the cover of the September 4, 1976 issue of Peninsula Living Magazine; the magazine issue itself also showcased his collection.

Wolf resides with his wife of 50 years, Bonnie, and their cat, in Boston, Massachusetts.

== Roger Rabbit ==
Gary K. Wolf is best known for creating the comedic mystery series centered on Roger Rabbit, a cartoon character in an alternate universe where “toons” and humans coexist. The series began with Who Censored Roger Rabbit? (1981), which inspired the hit film Who Framed Roger Rabbit (1988). In the original novel, Eddie Valiant, a hard-boiled detective, is hired by Roger Rabbit, a comic strip star, to investigate broken promises from his employers. The case spirals into a murder mystery exposing deception, a magical genie, and Roger's true nature.

The series continued with Who P-P-P-Plugged Roger Rabbit? (1991), retconning the original as Jessica Rabbit's dream and aligning with the film. Eddie investigates new murders and Roger's scheming cousin, Dodger Rabbit, in a noir-inspired tale blending toons and human intrigue. In The Road to Toontown (2012), Wolf collected short stories, including a new Jessica Rabbit narrative that delves deeper into the Roger Rabbit universe. The series returned with Who Wacked Roger Rabbit? (2013), where Eddie Valiant protects actor Gary Cooper during a Toontown film shoot, uncovering threats and sinister underworld schemes. In Jessica Rabbit: XERIOUS Business (2022), Jessica Rabbit is reimagined as Jessica Krupnick, a human turned secret agent for the XERIOUS Organization, showcasing her intelligence and evolution beyond her femme fatale origins.

In 2001, Wolf sued The Walt Disney Company for unpaid royalties. After appeals and hearings, Wolf prevailed in 2005, receiving $180,000–$400,000. Wolf proposed a prequel to Who Framed Roger Rabbit in 2013, reimagining The Stooge with Roger and Mickey Mouse, exploring Roger's backstory and his relationship with Jessica Rabbit. Roger Rabbit appeared as a cameo in Disney+’s 2022 Chip 'n Dale: Rescue Rangers film.

In November 2025, Wolf announced that he had reacquired the rights to Roger Rabbit through a copyright termination clause that enables him to reclaim copyrights of the character 35 years since selling them to Disney.

== Selected bibliography ==
- Killerbowl (September 26, 1975) (ISBN 0-385-04738-X)
- A Generation Removed (May 27, 1977) (ISBN 0-385-11549-0)
- The Resurrectionist (July 20, 1979) (ISBN 0-385-13141-0)
- Who Censored Roger Rabbit? (June 6, 1981) (ISBN 0-345-30325-3)
- Who P-P-P-Plugged Roger Rabbit? (July 30, 1991) (ISBN 0-679-40094-X)
- Amityville House of Pancakes Vol 3 (December 1, 2006) (ISBN 1-89495-335-5)
- Space Vulture (March 4, 2008) (ISBN 0-765-31852-0)
- The Road To Toontown (July 2012) ISBN 978-1654217372)
- Penumbra eMag Vol 1 Issue 10 (July 2012) (ISSN 2163-4092)
- The Late Great Show! (October 5, 2012) (ISBN 978-1-61937-408-9)
- Typical Day (December 7, 2012) (ISBN 978-1-61937-456-0)
- Who Wacked Roger Rabbit? (November 29, 2013) (ISBN 978-1-61937-605-2)
- Jessica Rabbit: XERIOUS Business (May 4, 2022) (ISBN 979-8805451318)
