= Who Framed Roger Rabbit =

1988 film by Robert Zemeckis

- Theatrical release poster
- Directed by: Robert Zemeckis
- Screenplay by: Jeffrey Price; Peter S. Seaman
- Based on: Who Censored Roger Rabbit? by Gary K. Wolf
- Produced by: Frank Marshall; Robert Watts
- Starring: Bob Hoskins; Christopher Lloyd; Charles Fleischer; Stubby Kaye; Joanna Cassidy
- Cinematography: Dean Cundey
- Edited by: Arthur Schmidt
- Music by: Alan Silvestri
- Production companies: Touchstone Pictures; Amblin Entertainment; Silver Screen Partners III
- Distributed by: Buena Vista Pictures Distribution
- Release dates: June 21, 1988 (New York City); June 22, 1988 (United States)
- Running time: 104 minutes
- Country: United States
- Language: English
- Budget: $50.6 million (Note: The budget has been commonly reported as $70 million, including by The New York Times in 1991, which subsequently issued an erratum to state that both Amblin and Touchstone insist the budget was "about $50 million". Publications of the film's accounts since then indicate that the exact production cost of the film was $58,166,000, including the production overhead which came to a total of $7,587,000, putting the net cost at $50,587,000.)
- Box office: $351.5 million

Who Framed Roger Rabbit is a 1988 American fantasy comedy film directed by Robert Zemeckis and written by Jeffrey Price and Peter S. Seaman, based on Gary K. Wolf's 1982 novel Who Censored Roger Rabbit? It combines live action and animation and is set in a world in which humans and cartoons co-exist. Bob Hoskins stars as Eddie Valiant, a private investigator in Hollywood in 1947, who must help exonerate Roger Rabbit (voiced by Charles Fleischer), a cartoon rabbit who has been framed for murder. Christopher Lloyd, Stubby Kaye and Joanna Cassidy co-star.

Walt Disney Studios purchased the film rights to the novel shortly after its publication. Price and Seaman wrote two drafts of the script before Disney brought in executive producer Steven Spielberg and his production company, Amblin Entertainment. Zemeckis was brought on to direct and Canadian-British animator Richard Williams was hired to supervise the animation sequences. Production was moved from Los Angeles to Elstree Studios in England to accommodate Williams and his animators. While filming, the production budget rapidly expanded and the shooting schedule overran.

Who Framed Roger Rabbit was released through Disney's Touchstone Pictures banner in the United States on June 22, 1988. It received acclaim for its visuals, humor, writing, performances and groundbreaking combination of live-action and animation. It grossed $351.5 million worldwide, becoming the second-highest-grossing film of 1988, behind Rain Man. It renewed interest in the golden age of American animation, spearheading the renaissance age of American animation and the Disney Renaissance. It won three Academy Awards for Best Film Editing, Best Sound Effects Editing and Best Visual Effects and received a Special Achievement Academy Award for Williams' animation direction. In 2016, Who Framed Roger Rabbit was selected for preservation in the United States National Film Registry by the Library of Congress as "culturally, historically, or aesthetically significant".

== Plot ==
In 1947 Los Angeles, animated cartoon characters, or "toons", co-exist with humans. Private detective Eddie Valiant, once a staunch ally of the toons, has become a depressed alcoholic following his brother Teddy's murder by an unknown toon five years prior. Maroon Cartoon Studios owner R.K. Maroon, upset about the recent poor performance of his toon star Roger Rabbit, hires Eddie to investigate rumors that Roger's glamorous toon wife, Jessica, is having an affair with Marvin Acme, owner of the Acme Corporation and Toontown, the animated metropolis in which toons reside.

After watching Jessica perform at The Ink and Paint Club, Eddie secretly photographs her and Acme playing patty-cake. He shows the pictures to Roger, who becomes distraught, refusing to believe Jessica was unfaithful. The next morning, Acme is found murdered, and evidence implicates Roger. At the crime scene, Eddie meets Judge Doom, the sinister human judge of Toontown—having bribed the electorate for their votes—and his five weasel minions, the Toon Patrol. Doom reveals that he will execute Roger using the "dip", a chemical concoction which can destroy the otherwise invulnerable toons.

Roger's toon co-star, Baby Herman, believes Roger is innocent and suggests to Eddie that Acme's missing will, which supposedly bequeaths Toontown to the toons, may have been the killer's true motive. Eddie returns to his office and finds Roger hiding there, insisting that he has been framed. Eddie agrees to help after finding evidence of Acme's will; he hides Roger in a bar tended by his girlfriend, Dolores. Later, Jessica tells Eddie that Maroon threatened Roger's career unless she posed for the compromising photos. Meanwhile, Dolores uncovers that Cloverleaf Industries recently bought the city's Pacific Electric railway system and will purchase Toontown at midnight unless Acme's will is found. Doom and the Toon Patrol find Roger, but he and Eddie escape with help from Benny, a toon taxi cab. Sheltering in a movie theater, Eddie sees a newsreel of Maroon selling his studio to Cloverleaf.

While Eddie goes to the studio to interrogate Maroon, Jessica abducts Roger. Maroon denies involvement in Acme's murder, admitting he intended to blackmail Acme into selling his company, as otherwise Cloverleaf would not buy the studio. In the middle of his confession, Maroon is assassinated, and Eddie spots Jessica fleeing. Assuming she is the assailant, he reluctantly follows her into Toontown after throwing away his remaining alcohol. After saving Eddie from being shot by Doom, Jessica reveals that her actions were to ensure Roger's safety, and it was Doom who killed Acme and Maroon. Acme gave his will to Jessica for safety. When she examined it, the paper was blank.

Doom and the Toon Patrol capture Jessica and Eddie, bringing them to Acme's factory. Doom reveals that he is the sole shareholder of Cloverleaf. He plans to erase Toontown with a dip-spraying machine so he can build a freeway in its place and decommission the railway system to force people to use it. When Roger fails to save Jessica, the couple is tied to a hook in front of the machine's sprayer. Eddie performs a comic routine that causes four of the weasels to laugh themselves to death, then kicks their leader into the dip before confronting Doom. After being flattened by a steamroller, Doom reveals himself as a disguised toon and Teddy's murderer. Struggling against Doom's toon abilities, Eddie empties the machine's dip supply, spraying and destroying Doom. The machine crashes through the wall into Toontown, where it is destroyed by a train.

As police and toons gather at the scene, Eddie realizes that Acme's will was written on the "blank" paper in invisible ink, confirming that the toons inherit Toontown. Having regained his sense of humor, Eddie happily enters Toontown alongside Dolores, Roger, Jessica, and the toons.

== Cast ==
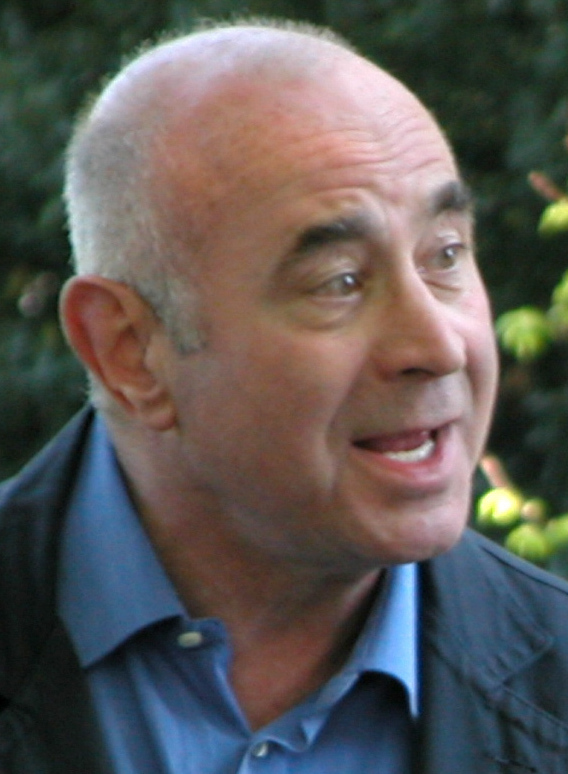
Bob Hoskins (pictured in 2006) plays the role of Eddie Valiant.

=== Live-action cast ===
- Bob Hoskins as Eddie Valiant, a Los Angeles private investigator
- Christopher Lloyd as Judge Doom, a Toontown Superior Court judge
- Stubby Kaye as Marvin Acme, the owner of the Acme Corporation and Toontown
- Joanna Cassidy as Dolores, a bar waitress and Eddie's girlfriend
- Alan Tilvern as R.K. Maroon, the head of Maroon Cartoons
- Richard LeParmentier as Lieutenant Santino
- Richard Ridings as Angelo, a bar patron who frequents Dolores' place
- Joel Silver as Raoul J. Raoul, a Maroon Cartoons director
- Paul Springer as Augie
- Mike Edmonds as Stretch
- Betsy Brantley as Jessica Rabbit's performance model
- Morgan Deare as a Maroon Cartoons editor

=== Voice cast ===
- Charles Fleischer as:
  - Roger Rabbit, a toon rabbit and cartoon short star
  - Benny the Cab, a toon taxi
  - Greasy, the second-in-command of the Toon Patrol
  - Psycho, a member of the Toon Patrol
- Lou Hirsch as Baby Herman, an infant-based toon and Roger's co-star, who speaks normally when off set
- David Lander as Smart Ass, the leader of the Toon Patrol
- Fred Newman as Stupid, a member of the Toon Patrol
- June Foray as:
  - Wheezy, a member of the Toon Patrol
  - Lena Hyena, an unattractive humanoid toon whom Eddie mistakes for Jessica
- Mel Blanc as:
  - Bugs Bunny
  - Daffy Duck
  - Porky Pig
  - Tweety
  - Sylvester the Cat
- Joe Alaskey as Yosemite Sam
- Wayne Allwine as Mickey Mouse
- Tony Anselmo as Donald Duck
  - Clarence Nash as Donald Duck (archival recordings)
- Tony Pope as:
  - Goofy
  - The Big Bad Wolf
- Mae Questel as Betty Boop
- Russi Taylor as:
  - Minnie Mouse
  - Song of the South's hummingbirds
- Pat Buttram, Jim Cummings and Jim Gallant as toon bullets which Eddie once received from Yosemite Sam
- Les Perkins as Mr. Toad from The Adventures of Ichabod and Mr. Toad
- Mary T. Radford as Fantasia's Hyacinth Hippo
- Cherry Davis as Woody Woodpecker
- Morgan Deare as Bongo the Gorilla, the bouncer of The Ink and Paint Club
- Peter Westy as Pinocchio
- Richard Williams as Droopy
- April Winchell as Mrs. Herman and Baby Herman's "baby noises"
- Archival recordings of Frank Sinatra were used for a singing sword at the Acme factory, whose character design is based on Sinatra.

Uncredited cast members include Kathleen Turner as Jessica Rabbit, Roger Rabbit's wife; Frank Welker as Dumbo,, Nancy Cartwright as Yoyo Dodo and a toon shoe destroyed by the Dip, Bill Farmer as Koko the Clown and Goofy's singing voice, and Dave Spafford as Daffy Duck's "woo-hoos".

== Production ==
=== Development ===
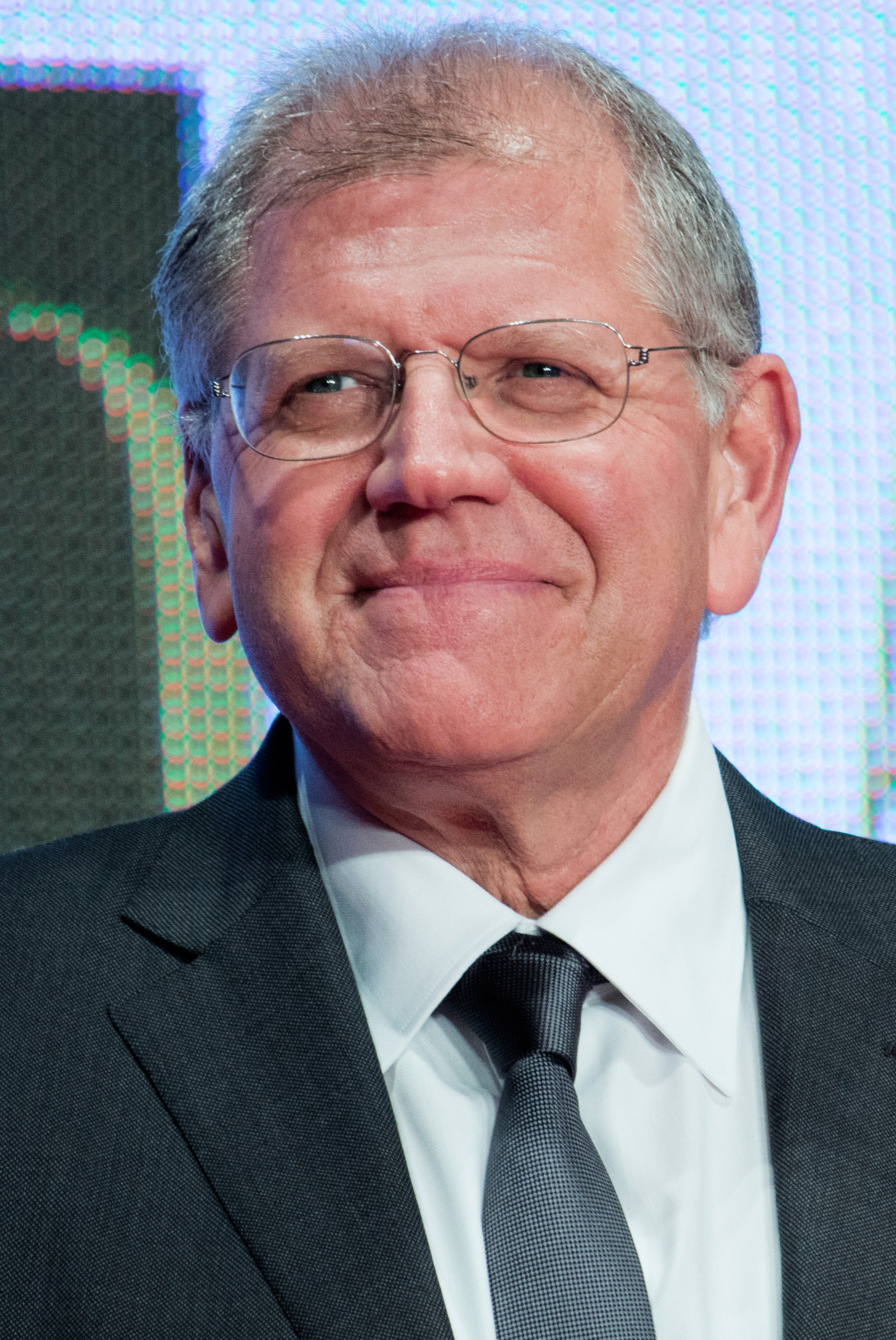
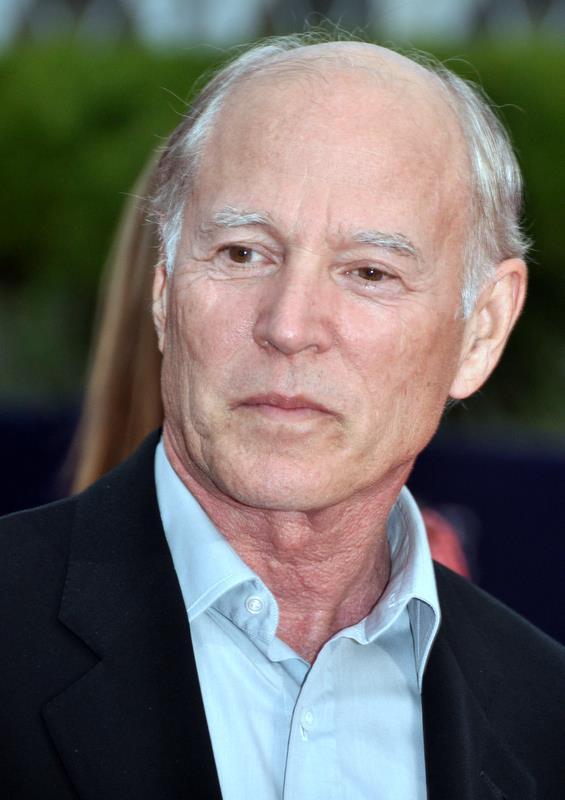
Director Robert Zemeckis (left) and Producer Frank Marshall (right).

Walt Disney Productions purchased the film rights to Gary K. Wolf's novel Who Censored Roger Rabbit? shortly after its publication in 1981. Ron W. Miller, then president of Disney, saw it as a perfect opportunity to produce a blockbuster. Jeffrey Price and Peter S. Seaman were hired to write the script, penning two drafts. In 1982, Robert Zemeckis offered his services as director, but Disney declined as his two previous films (I Wanna Hold Your Hand and Used Cars) had been box-office bombs. Between 1981 and 1983 Disney developed test footage with Darrell Van Citters as animation director, Paul Reubens voicing Roger Rabbit, Peter Renaday as Eddie Valiant, Russi Taylor as Jessica Rabbit, and Jack Angel as Captain Cleaver. The project was revamped in 1985 by Michael Eisner, the then-new CEO of Disney. Amblin Entertainment, which consisted of Steven Spielberg, Frank Marshall and Kathleen Kennedy, were approached to produce Who Framed Roger Rabbit alongside Disney. The original budget was projected at $50 million, which Disney felt was too expensive.

Who Framed Roger Rabbit was green-lit when the budget decreased to $30 million, which at the time would have still made it the most expensive animated film ever produced. Walt Disney Studios chairman Jeffrey Katzenberg argued that the hybrid of live-action and animation would "save" Walt Disney Feature Animation. Spielberg's contract included an extensive amount of creative control and a large percentage of the box-office profits. Disney kept all merchandising rights. Spielberg convinced Warner Bros., Fleischer Studios, Harvey Comics, King Features Syndicate, Felix the Cat Productions, Turner Entertainment Co., and Universal Pictures/Walter Lantz Productions to "lend" their characters to appear with (in some cases) stipulations on how those characters were portrayed; for example, Disney's Donald Duck and Warner Bros.' Daffy Duck appear as equally talented dueling pianists, Mickey Mouse and Bugs Bunny also share a scene as skydivers, and Tinker Bell and Porky Pig close the film. Apart from the agreement, and some of the original voice artists reprising their roles, Warner Bros. and the various other companies were not involved in the production of Roger Rabbit. Executives at Warner Bros. were displeased by animators using the Daffy design by Bob Clampett and demanded they use the design by Chuck Jones; in response Zemeckis had separate artists animate Daffy using Jones' design to satisfy Warner Bros., in order to have Clampett's design in the final film. The producers were unable to acquire the rights to use Popeye, Tom and Jerry, Little Lulu, Casper the Friendly Ghost, the Fox and the Crow, the Terrytoons characters, or Rocky and Bullwinkle for appearances from their respective owners (King Features, Turner, Western Publishing, Harvey Comics, Viacom, Screen Gems, and Jay Ward Productions). Other characters like Warner Bros.' Bosko and Junior Bear, Fleischer Studios' Fitz the Dog and Bimbo; Ub Iwerks' Flip the Frog, and Hanna-Barbera's Yakky Doodle were also planned to appear. Despite acquiring the rights to use Betty Boop and Koko the Clown, King Features valued Koko highly, asking for $50,000 for a simple cameo appearance. To get around the high price and legal issues, the animators redesigned Koko to have hair resembling that of Bozo the Clown instead of a hat, and changed his colors at the end of the film. The film was initially planned to not feature cameo appearances of characters created after 1947, with the exception of Wile E. Coyote and the Road Runner, who were Zemeckis' favorite cartoon characters.

Terry Gilliam was offered the chance to direct, but he found the project too technically challenging. ("Pure laziness on my part," he later admitted, "I completely regret that decision.") Zemeckis was eventually hired to direct in 1985, based on the success of Romancing the Stone and Back to the Future. Disney executives were continuing to suggest Darrell Van Citters direct the animation, but Spielberg and Zemeckis decided against it. Richard Williams was eventually hired to direct the animation. Zemeckis wanted the film to exhibit "Disney's high quality of animation, Warner Bros.' characterization, and Tex Avery humor."

=== Casting ===
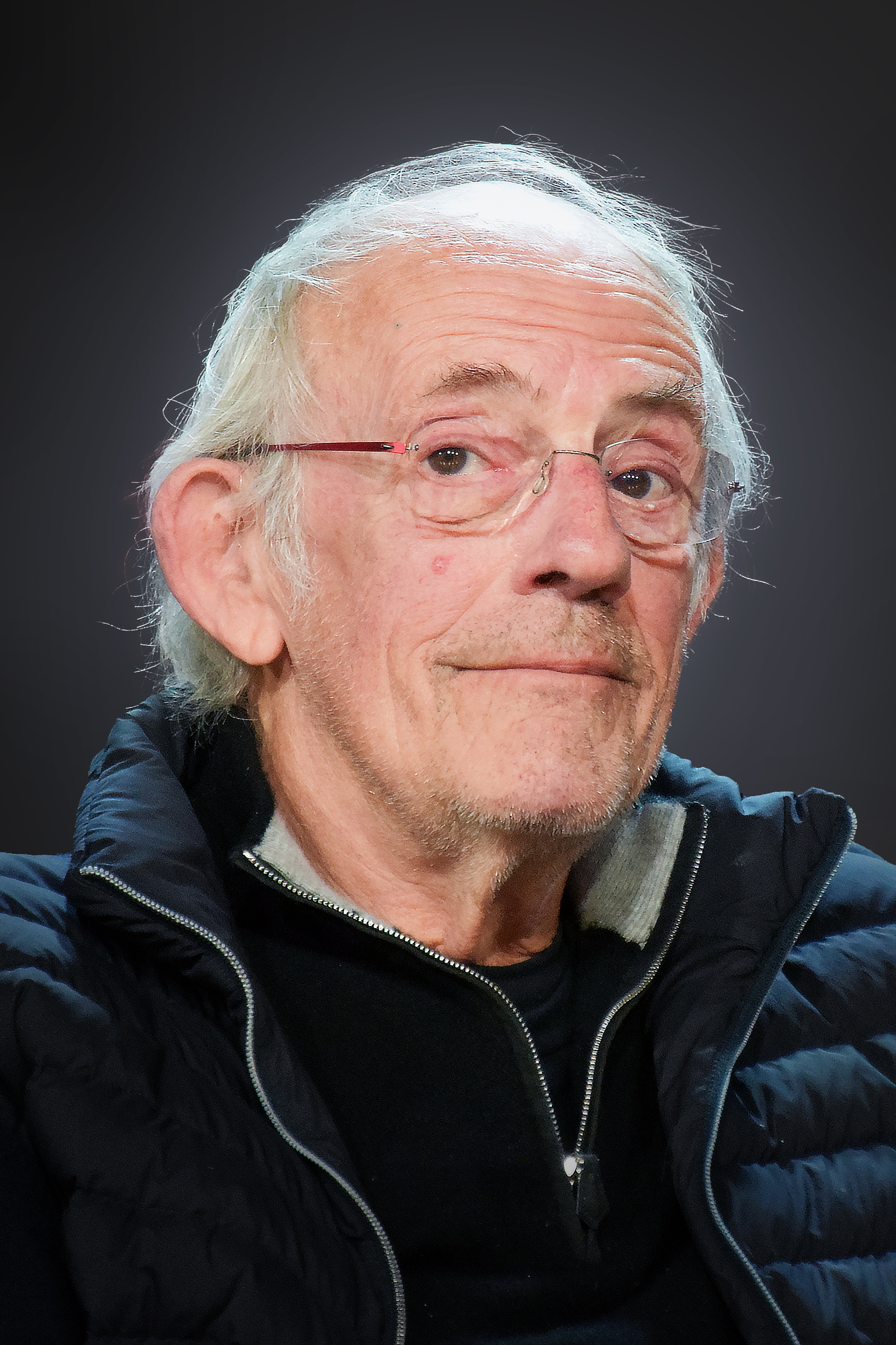
Christopher Lloyd
(Judge Doom)

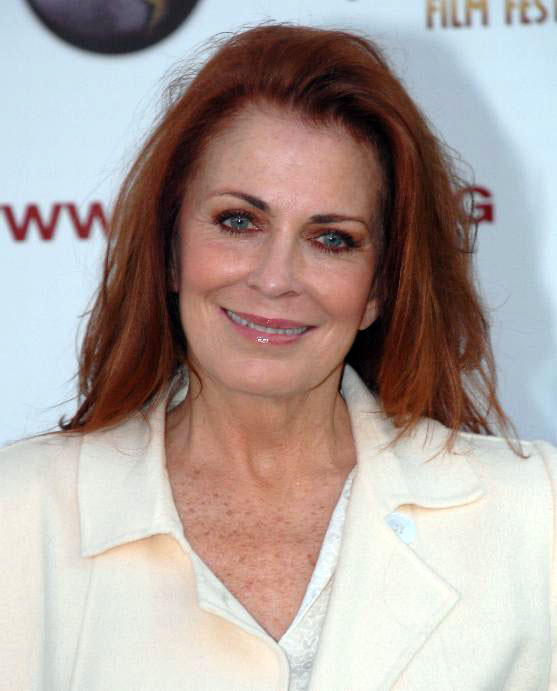
Joanna Cassidy
(Dolores)

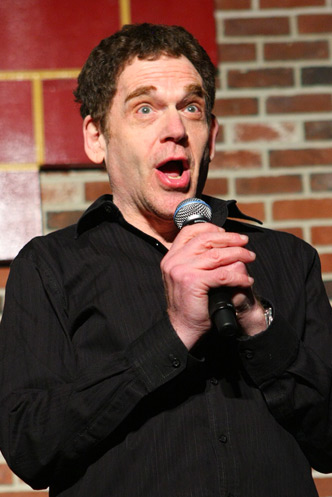
Charles Fleischer
(Roger Rabbit)

Peter Renaday originally portrayed Eddie Valiant in the original test footage from 1983, while animator Mike Gabriel played him in some publicity photographs. Joe Pantoliano portrayed Eddie Valiant in a screen test in 1986.

Harrison Ford was Spielberg's original choice to play Eddie Valiant, but his price was too high. Eddie Murphy rejected the role after misunderstanding the "toon" concept, a decision he later regretted. In 2025, Murphy said: "[It] sounded ridiculous to me, and I passed on it. And afterwards, I was like, 'Oh, that's fucking amazing.'" Paul Newman also turned down the role because he disliked the concept. Bill Murray was also considered, but due to his idiosyncratic method of receiving offers for roles missed out on it. Ed Harris and James Woods auditioned. Ultimately, Bob Hoskins was chosen by Spielberg because for his skill and because Spielberg believed he had a hopeful demeanor and he looked like he belonged in that era.

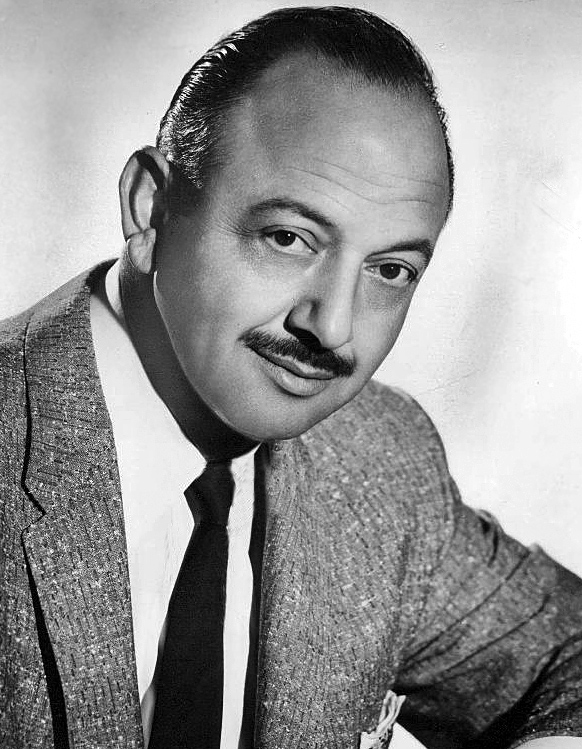
Mel Blanc
(Bugs Bunny, Daffy Duck, Porky Pig, Tweety and Sylvester the Cat)

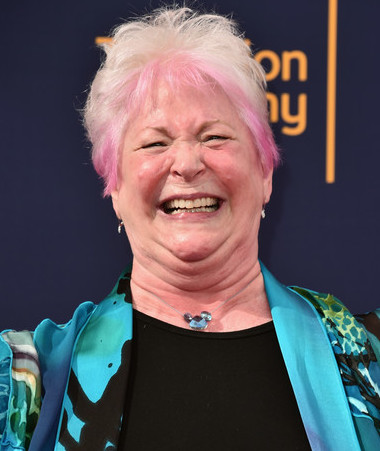
Russi Taylor
(Minnie Mouse)

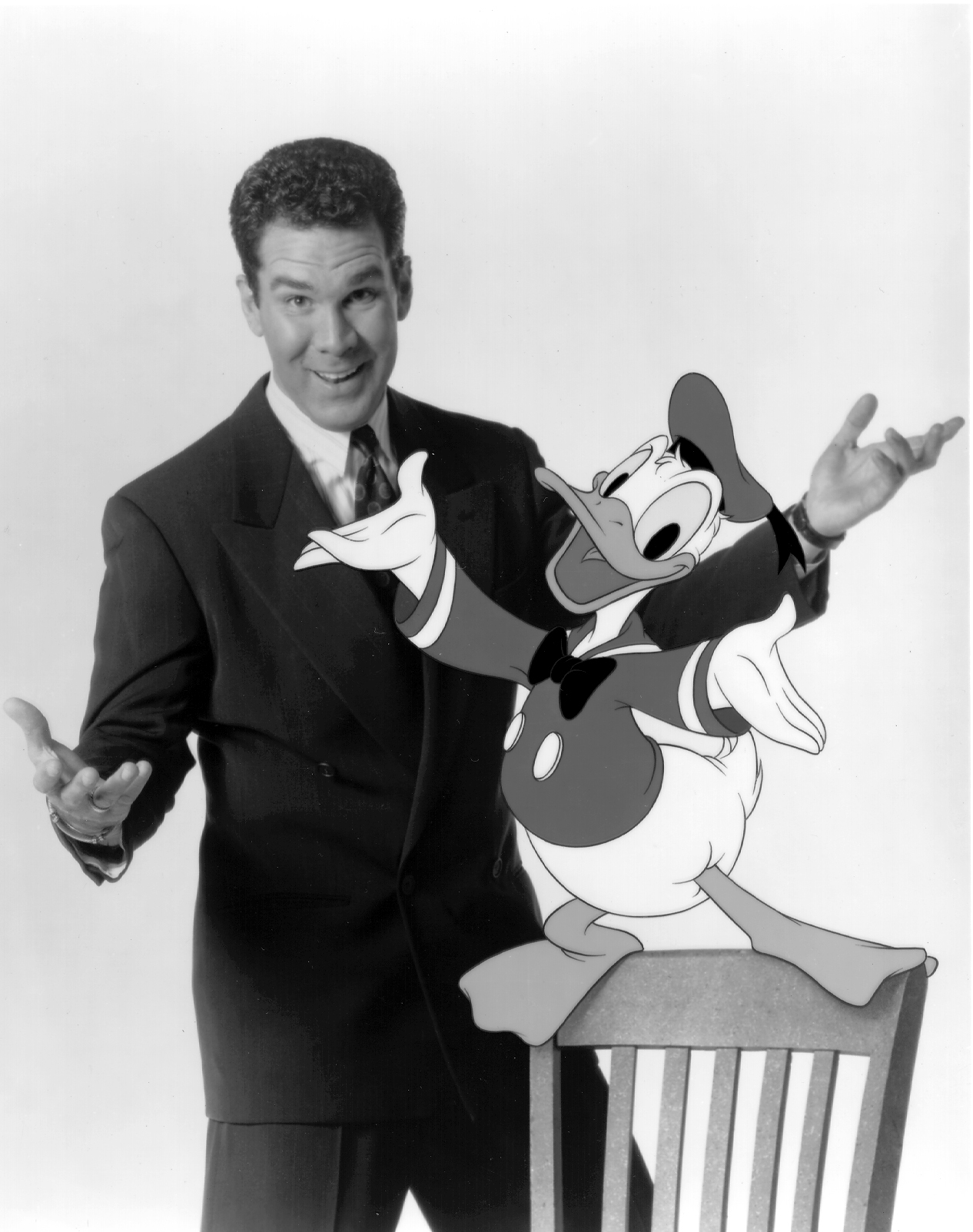
Tony Anselmo
(Donald Duck)

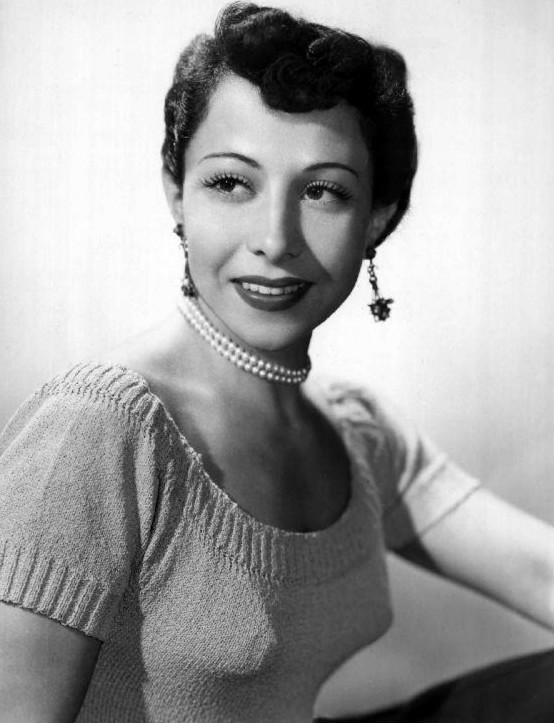
June Foray
(Wheezy)

Paul Reubens originally auditioned for the role of Roger Rabbit after provided his voice in the early 1983 screen test, but lost out. Eddie Deezen, who had worked with Zemeckis previously, also auditioned for the role, but lost out. The role was eventually given to Charles Fleischer. Before filming, Fleischer was asked to come up with a speech impediment for Roger. He gave Roger a lisp and the stammering catchphrase "P-p-p-please!" as a tribute to all the other famous cartoon characters with speech impediments, which was inspired by Huntz Hall's Sach Jones in The Bowery Boys. He had invented the "cheek flutter" while performing the voice of B.B. in Deadly Friend, inspired by his impression of a flying saucer landing on a horse in his stand-up act. His portrayal of Roger was also inspired by Screwy Squirrel. To facilitate Hoskins' performance, Fleischer dressed in a Roger Rabbit costume and "stood in" behind camera for most scenes. Roger was originally designed by Michael Giaimo to resemble and act like Michael J. Fox, but was redesigned by Williams. Williams explained that Roger was a combination of "Tex Avery's cashew nut-shaped head, the swatch of red hair... like Droopy's, Goofy's overalls, Porky Pig's bow tie, Mickey Mouse's gloves, Br'er Rabbit's feet, and Bugs Bunny-like cheeks and ears." Spielberg suggested that Roger's mouth resemble that of Thumper from Bambi (who was made Roger's uncle in the film), but this idea was ignored. Williams also cited Wile E. Coyote as an influence for Roger's expressions, and wanted the character to have ladle-shaped ears, though his animators would sometimes draw Roger with pointy ears similar to Bugs, much to Williams' frustration. He described the process of creating him like an "American flag" with the red overalls, white fur and blue bow tie so that American audiences would enjoy him subliminally.

Kathleen Turner was brought along by Zemeckis to provide the uncredited voice of Jessica Rabbit, Roger Rabbit's wife. Zemeckis had worked with Turner in Romancing the Stone. Turner accepted the role because she was pregnant at the time, and "just had to show up and do [Jessica's] voice". Jessica's singing voice was provided by Spielberg's then-wife Amy Irving. Williams explained that Jessica's design and characterization were inspired by Rita Hayworth, Veronica Lake's peek-a-boo hairstyle, and Lauren Bacall, describing the combination as an "ultimate male fantasy, drawn by a cartoonist". Joanna Cassidy, who was cast as Dolores, dyed her natural red hair brown to differentiate Dolores from Jessica, and did her own makeup for the role, basing it on Joan Crawford.

Tim Curry auditioned for the role of Judge Doom, but was rejected because the producers found him too terrifying. Christopher Lloyd was cast because he previously worked with Zemeckis and Spielberg on Back to the Future. He compared his part as Doom to his previous role as the Klingon commander Kruge in Star Trek III: The Search for Spock, both overly evil characters which he considered "fun to play". He avoided blinking his eyes while on camera to portray the character.

Lou Hirsch auditioned to play a human character, but provided the voice of Baby Herman instead, which Hirsch described as "a combination of Wallace Beery and his [British] friends imitating [him]". Williams stated that Herman's design was a combination of "Elmer Fudd and Tweety crashed together". Fleischer also voiced Benny the Cab, Psycho, and Greasy. Lou Rawls was the original choice for Benny the Cab but was replaced by Fleischer. Jim Cummings was originally going to voice some of the weasels. Joel Silver was cast as Raoul J. Raoul, the frustrated director of the cartoon Somethin's Cookin', as part of a prank aimed at Disney CEO Michael Eisner, who had a strained relationship with Silver. Silver shaved his beard and paid his own expenses to not have his name in initial cast lists. When Eisner learned of Silver's casting as Raoul after production wrapped, he praised the performance.

Russi Taylor and Tony Pope recorded some scenes as Minnie Mouse and Goofy, respectively, but said scenes did not make the final cut, despite the former actor being listed in the end credits. Additional toon voices were provided by a loop group consisting of Frank Welker, Bill Farmer, Nancy Cartwright, Anne Lockhart, Jack Angel, Mickie McGowan, and others; Welker voiced Dumbo, Farmer recorded a couple of lines for Goofy for the ending scene (though they would be re-recorded by Pope in the final version), and Cartwright provided the vocal effects of a toon shoe.

Mel Blanc reprised his roles as Bugs Bunny, Daffy Duck, Porky Pig, Tweety, and Sylvester the Cat, alternating with his son Noel Blanc during production. Blanc had intended to voice Yosemite Sam and Foghorn Leghorn, but performing both voices took a toll on his throat in his later years, thus he was replaced with future Looney Tunes voice actor Joe Alaskey. However, a scene featuring Foghorn was cut from the final version. Blanc also could not do Daffy's "woo-hoos" as energetically as he used to, so animator Dave Spafford filled in for him. Future Porky Pig voice actor Bob Bergen recorded Porky's line of dialogue at the end of the film, but was replaced with Blanc. All of these marked a rare instance of Blanc being replaced (or augmented) for any of his Looney Tunes characters during his lifetime.

Williams provided the voice of Droopy, whom he stated years later was his favorite cartoon character. Mary Healey recorded Betty Boop's original lines after Mae Questel had dropped out. However, Healey was replaced by Questel, who was brought back to reprise the role. Cherry Davis voiced Woody Woodpecker, having been selected by Walter Lantz to voice the character following his wife Grace Stafford's retirement from the role. The toons' singing voices for "Smile, Darn Ya, Smile!" in the scene in which Eddie arrives in Toontown were performed by the loop group, with Bill Farmer doing Goofy's singing voice. The song's reprisal was performed by most of the animators, recorded during a wrap party at the Barbican Centre in London.

=== Writing ===
The plot incorporated the actual closing of Pacific Electric.

Price and Seaman were brought aboard to continue writing the script once Spielberg and Zemeckis were hired. For inspiration, the two writers studied the work of Walt Disney and Warner Bros. Cartoons from the Golden Age of American animation, especially Tex Avery and Bob Clampett cartoons. The Cloverleaf streetcar subplot was inspired by Chinatown. Price and Seaman said that "the Red Car plot, suburb expansion, urban and political corruption really did happen". "In Los Angeles, during the 1940s, car and tire companies teamed up against the Pacific Electric Railway system and bought them out of business. Where the freeway runs in Los Angeles is where the Red Car used to be." In Wolf's novel Who Censored Roger Rabbit?, the toons were comic-strip characters rather than movie stars.

During the writing process, Price and Seaman were unsure of whom to include as the villain in the plot. They wrote scripts that had either Jessica Rabbit or Baby Herman as the villain, but ultimately chose the newly created character Judge Doom. Doom was supposed to have an animated vulture sit on his shoulder, but this was deleted due to the technical challenges this posed. Doom would also have a suitcase of 12 small, animated kangaroos that act as a jury (a play on "kangaroo court"), by having their joeys pop out of their pouches, each with letters, when put together would spell YOU ARE GUILTY. This was also cut for budget and technical reasons.

The Toon Patrol (Stupid, Smart Ass, Greasy, Wheezy, and Psycho) satirizes the Seven Dwarfs (Doc, Grumpy, Happy, Sleepy, Bashful, Sneezy, and Dopey), who appeared in Snow White and the Seven Dwarfs (1937). Originally seven weasels were to mimic the dwarfs complement, but eventually two of them, Slimey and Sleazy, were written out of the script. The Dwarfs themselves appear briefly in the finished film, in the background after Valiant crashes his car in Toontown. Further references included The Ink and Paint Club resembling the Harlem Cotton Club, while Zemeckis compared Judge Doom's invention of the Dip to eliminate all the toons to Hitler's Final Solution. Doom was originally the hunter who killed Bambi's mother. Benny the Cab was first conceived to be a Volkswagen Beetle before being changed to a taxi cab. The "dueling pianists" scene was originally storyboarded by Williams and Chuck Jones (later by Joe Ranft and Mark Kausler), in which Donald Duck would receive praise from the audience, and Daffy Duck would only gain the attention of crickets chirping; the scene was changed to fit the film's atmosphere. Dave Spafford snuck in a frame of Daffy using a baby tied up in rope as one of the props with which to play the piano, which was later removed at Williams' insistence. The animators originally did an homage to the original Betty Boop shorts at Zemeckis' request, having Betty's dress slide down to reveal her bosom in a single frame; this was removed for later home video releases. A scene at the Ink and Paint Club in which Bugs Bunny converses with Walt Disney was planned, but was cut. A blue cow was included as an Easter egg in the Toontown scene, inspired by a childhood drawing by Wolf. Ideas originally conceived for the story also included a sequence set at Marvin Acme's funeral, whose attendees included Eddie, Foghorn Leghorn, Mickey Mouse, Minnie Mouse, Donald Duck, Goofy, the Three Little Pigs, Bugs Bunny, Daffy Duck, Porky and Petunia Pig, Elmer Fudd, Yosemite Sam, Sylvester the Cat, Hippety Hopper, Tom and Jerry, Droopy, Tex Avery's Slick McWolf, Heckle and Jeckle, Chip 'n' Dale, Felix the Cat, Herman and Katnip, Mighty Mouse, Superman, Dick Tracy, Popeye, Olive Oyl, Bluto, Clarabelle Cow, Horace Horsecollar, the Seven Dwarfs, Andy Panda, Baby Huey, Casper the Friendly Ghost, Humphrey Bogart, and Clark Gable in cameo appearances. This scene was cut for pacing reasons at the storyboard stage. (Note: Attributed to multiple references:) The working titles included Murder in Toontown, Toons, Dead Toons Don't Pay Bills, The Toontown Trial, Trouble in Toontown, and Eddie Goes to Toontown.

=== Filming ===
Judge Doom (played by Christopher Lloyd) threatening Roger Rabbit before introducing him to the dip. Mime artists, puppeteers, mannequins and robotic arms were commonly used during filming to help the actors interact with "open air and imaginative cartoon characters".

Williams admitted he was "openly disdainful of the Disney bureaucracy" and refused to work in Los Angeles. Accommodating Williams and his animators, production moved to England where a studio, Walt Disney Animation UK (subsuming Richard Williams Animation), was created for this purpose; located at The Forum, 74–80 Camden Street, in Camden Town, London, while the live-action production was based at Elstree Studios. Disney and Spielberg also told Williams that in return they would help distribute his unfinished film The Thief and the Cobbler. Supervising animators and additional animators and artists included Van Citters, Dale Baer, Jane Baer, Michael Peraza, Joe Ranft, Tom Sito, James Baxter, Jacques Muller, Colin White, David Bowers, Andreas Deja, Russell Hall, Mike Gabriel, Chris Jenkins, Phil Nibbelink, Nik Ranieri, Roy Naisbitt, Simon Wells, Matthew O'Callaghan, Chuck Gammage, David Byers-Brown, Harald Siepermann, Hans Bacher, Bruce W. Smith, Peter Western, Roger Chiasson, Uli Meyer, Dave Spafford, Mark Kausler, Alexander Williams, Fraser MacLean, and Ron Dias; Williams and associate producer Don Hahn spearheaded the animation production, with the former animating almost every frame of Baby Herman, whom Williams said was his favorite character. The animation production was split between Walt Disney Animation UK and a specialized unit in Glendale, California, set up by Walt Disney Feature Animation and supervised by Baer. Kathleen Swain of Ocatillo Pictures produced backgrounds for the Somethin's Cookin' and Toontown scenes. The production budget continued to escalate, while the shooting schedule ran longer than expected. When the budget reached $40 million, Disney CEO Michael Eisner seriously considered shutting down production, but studio chairman Jeffrey Katzenberg talked him out of it. Despite the budget escalating to over $50 million, Disney moved forward on production because they were enthusiastic to work with Spielberg.

VistaVision cameras installed with motion-control technology were used for the photography of the live-action scenes, which would be composited with animation. Rubber mannequins of Roger Rabbit, Baby Herman, and the Toon Patrol portrayed the animated characters during rehearsals to teach the actors where to look when acting with "open air and imaginative cartoon characters", while Betsy Brantley served as a stand-in for Jessica Rabbit. Many of the live-action props held by cartoon characters were shot on set with the props either held by robotic arms (designed by George Gibbs) or manipulated with strings, similar to a marionette. For example, a test was shot at Industrial Light & Magic (ILM) where an actor playing the detective would climb down a fire escape, and the rabbit would follow and knock down some stacked boxes. Naturally, there would not be an actual rabbit during the test, so the camera would go down the fire escape and the boxes would fall when a wire was pulled. Puppeteers included Don Austen, Michael Barclay, David Barclay, Mike Quinn, Toby Philpott, Christopher Leith, Geoff Felix, Ian Tregonning, David Bulbeck, Michael Bayliss, Marcus Clarke, William Todd-Jones, Patty Webb, James Barton, Mak Wilson, John Reed, Sue Dacre, Frazer Diamond, and Charles Schneider. Bob Hoskins studied his daughter Rosa playing with her imaginary friends to get the feel of acting with cartoon characters. He was required to take mime training courses in preparation and performed his own stunts. He experienced hallucinations of weasels and rabbits "creep[ing] out of the wall at [him]" for months after production wrapped, and did not appear in another film until Heart Condition in 1990. Hoskins' son Jack refused to talk to him for two weeks after seeing the film, saying he was unhappy that his father worked with cartoon characters such as Mickey Mouse, Bugs Bunny, Daffy Duck and Yosemite Sam and did not let him meet them. Charles Fleischer insisted on wearing a Roger Rabbit costume while on the set, to get into character. Principal photography began on December 12, 1986, and lasted for seven and a half months at Elstree Studios, with an additional month in Los Angeles and at ILM for blue screen effects of Toontown.

The Dimco Buildings in London were dressed as the fictional Acme Factory. The entrance of Desilu-Cahuenga Studios in Los Angeles served as the fictional Maroon Cartoon Studio lot. The exterior scene in front of Eddie's office was filmed at the now demolished Farr apartment building which was located on South Hope Street between 11th and 12th Street in Downtown Los Angeles; the exterior street scene around Eddie's office including the Pacific Electric Railway Station built set was also filmed on the same street. The scene in which a flattened Judge Doom reinflates himself was made using stop motion animation, done by Tom St. Amand. The puppets were made by Paula Lucchesi and Sheila Duignan. The scene in which Roger sees birds instead of stars after a refrigerator falls on him during the shooting of the cartoon Somethin's Cookin' was the last scene to be shot.

=== Animation and post-production ===
Post-production lasted for 14 months. ILM had already used CGI and digital compositing in a few movies, such as the stained glass knight scene in Young Sherlock Holmes, but the computers were still not powerful enough to make a complicated movie like Who Framed Roger Rabbit, so all the animation was done using cels and optical compositing. First, the animators and layout artists were given black-and-white printouts of the live-action scenes (known as "photostats"), and they placed their animation paper on top of them. The artists then drew the animated characters in relationship to the live-action footage. Due to Zemeckis' dynamic camera moves, the animators had to confront the challenge of ensuring the characters were not "slipping all over the place." Ensuring this did not happen and that the characters looked real, Zemeckis and Spielberg met for about an hour and a half and came up with an idea: "If the rabbit sits down in an old chair, dust comes up. He should always be touching something real." After the rough animation was complete, it was run through the normal process of traditional animation until the cels were shot on the rostrum camera with no background. Williams came up with the idea of making the cartoon characters "2.5-dimensional", and the animated footage was sent to ILM for compositing, where technicians animated three lighting layers (shadows, highlights, and tone mattes) separately, to give the characters a sense of depth and create the illusion of them affected by the set lighting. Finally, the lighting effects were optically composited on to the cartoon characters, who were, in turn, composited into the live-action footage. One of the most difficult effects was Jessica's dress in the nightclub scene because it had to flash sequins, an effect accomplished by filtering light through a plastic bag scratched with steel wool.

=== Music ===
Regular Zemeckis' collaborator Alan Silvestri composed the score, performed by the London Symphony Orchestra (LSO) under the direction of Silvestri. Zemeckis joked that "the British [musicians] could not keep up with Silvestri's jazz tempo". The performances of the music themes written for Jessica Rabbit were entirely improvised by a jazz combo performing with the LSO. The work of American composer Carl Stalling heavily influenced Silvestri's work on Who Framed Roger Rabbit. The soundtrack was originally released by Buena Vista Records on June 22, 1988, and reissued on CD on April 16, 2002.

On January 23, 2018, Intrada Records released a three-CD set with the complete score, alternates, and a remastered version of the original 1988 album, plus music from three Roger Rabbit short films, composed and conducted by Bruce Broughton and James Horner. Mondo Records and Walt Disney Records reissued the original 1988 album on vinyl on September 17, 2021.

The film features performances of "Hungarian Rhapsody" (Tony Anselmo and Mel Blanc), "Why Don't You Do Right?" (Amy Irving), "The Merry-Go-Round Broke Down" (Charles Fleischer), and "Smile, Darn Ya, Smile!" (Toon Chorus; the film's animators).

== Release ==
Michael Eisner, then-CEO, and Roy E. Disney, who was the vice chairman of the Walt Disney Company, felt Who Framed Roger Rabbit was too risqué with adult themes and sexual references. Eisner and Zemeckis disagreed over various elements of it but since Zemeckis had final cut privilege, he refused to make alterations. Roy E. Disney, head of Walt Disney Feature Animation along with studio chief Jeffrey Katzenberg, felt it was appropriate to release the film under the studio's adult-oriented Touchstone Pictures banner instead of the flagship Walt Disney Pictures banner.

=== Box office ===
Who Framed Roger Rabbit opened in the United States on June 22, 1988, grossing $11.2 million in 1,045 theaters during its opening weekend; it was in first place at the US box office. It was Disney's biggest opening weekend ever at the time of its release. It went on to gross $154.1 million in the United States and Canada and $197.4 million internationally, coming to a worldwide total of $351.5 million. At the time of release, it was the 20th-highest-grossing film of all time. It was also the second-highest-grossing film of 1988, behind only Rain Man. In the United Kingdom, it also set a record opening for a Disney film.

=== Home media ===
Who Framed Roger Rabbit was released on VHS on October 12, 1989, and on DVD on September 28, 1999. On March 25, 2003, Buena Vista Home Entertainment released it as a part of the "Vista Series" line in a two-disc collection with many extra features including a documentary, Behind the Ears: The True Story of Roger Rabbit; a deleted scene in which a pig's head is "tooned" onto Eddie's; the three Roger Rabbit shorts, Tummy Trouble, Roller Coaster Rabbit, and Trail Mix-Up; as well as a booklet and interactive games. The only short on the 2003 VHS release was Tummy Trouble. The 2003 DVD release is also THX certified and presents the film in full screen (1.33:1) on disc 1 and widescreen (1.85:1) on disc 2.

On March 12, 2013, Disney released Who Framed Roger Rabbit on Blu-ray and DVD combo pack special edition its 25th anniversary. It was also digitally restored by Prasad Studios removing dirt, tears, scratches, and other defects. Who Framed Roger Rabbit was released by Walt Disney Studios Home Entertainment on Ultra HD Blu-ray on December 7, 2021.

== Reception ==
=== Critical response ===
Who Framed Roger Rabbit received acclaim, making Business Insider's "best comedy movies of all time, according to critics" list. On the review aggregator website Rotten Tomatoes, it has an approval rating of 96% based on 76 reviews, and an average rating of 8.5/10. The site's critical consensus reads, "Who Framed Roger Rabbit is an innovative and entertaining film that features a groundbreaking mix of live action and animation, with a touching and original story to boot." TheaAggregator Metacritic has calculated a weighted average score of 83 out of 100 based on 15 reviews, indicating "universal acclaim". Who Framed Roger Rabbit was placed on 43 critics' top ten lists, third to only The Thin Blue Line and Bull Durham in 1988. Audiences polled by CinemaScore gave it an average grade of "A" on an A+ to F scale.

Roger Ebert of the Chicago Sun-Times gave Who Framed Roger Rabbit four out of four, calling it "sheer, enchanted entertainment from the first frame to the last-- a joyous, giddy, goofy celebration of the kind of fun you can have with a movie camera." He writes that the opening cartoon is "a masterpiece; I can't remember the last time I laughed so hard at an animated short. But then when a stunt goes wrong and the cartoon 'baby' stalks off the set and lights a cigar and tells the human director to go to hell, we know we're in a new and special universe." Gene Siskel of the Chicago Tribune praised the "dazzling, jaw-dropping opening four-minute sequence" and gave it three and a half out of four. Siskel named it the second-best film of the year, while Ebert ranked it eighth. Janet Maslin of The New York Times wrote that this is "a film whose best moments are so novel, so deliriously funny and so crazily unexpected that they truly must be seen to be believed". Desson Thomson of The Washington Post considered it be "a definitive collaboration of pure talent. Zemeckis had Walt Disney Pictures' enthusiastic backing, producer Steven Spielberg's pull, Warner Bros.'s blessing, Canadian animator Richard Williams' ink and paint, Mel Blanc's voice; Jeffrey Price and Peter S. Seaman's witty, frenetic screenplay; George Lucas' Industrial Light and Magic, and Bob Hoskins' comical performance as the burliest, shaggiest private eye." Gene Shalit on the Today Show called it "one of the most extraordinary movies ever made". Filmsite.org called it "technically marvelous" and a "landmark" that resulted from "unprecedented cooperation" between Warner Bros. and Disney. On CNN's 2019 miniseries The Movies, Tom Hanks called it the "most complicated movie ever made."

Richard Corliss, a film critic for Time, wrote: "The opening scene upstages the movie that emerges from it". Corliss was mainly annoyed by the homages to the golden age of American animation. Chuck Jones criticized the film in his book Chuck Jones Conversations. Among his complaints, Jones accused Zemeckis of robbing Richard Williams of any creative input and ruining the piano duel that both Williams and he had storyboarded.

=== Accolades ===
Award	Category	Nominee(s)	Result	Ref.
Academy Awards	Best Art Direction	Art Direction: Elliot Scott; Set Decoration: Peter Howitt	Nominated	
Academy Awards	Best Cinematography	Dean Cundey	Nominated	
Academy Awards	Best Film Editing	Arthur Schmidt	Won	
Academy Awards	Best Sound	Robert Knudson, John Boyd, Don Digirolamo, and Tony Dawe	Nominated	
Academy Awards	Best Sound Effects Editing	Charles L. Campbell and Louis Edemann	Won	
Academy Awards	Best Visual Effects	Ken Ralston, Richard Williams, Edward Jones, and George Gibbs	Won	
Academy Awards	Special Achievement Award	Richard Williams	Won	
American Cinema Editors Awards	Best Edited Feature Film	Arthur Schmidt	Nominated	
Annie Awards	Best Individual Achievement: Technical Achievement	Richard Williams	Won	
BMI Film & TV Awards	Film Music Award	Alan Silvestri	Won	
Boston Society of Film Critics Awards	Special Award	Richard Williams	Won	
British Academy Film Awards	Best Adapted Screenplay	Jeffrey Price and Peter S. Seaman	Nominated	
British Academy Film Awards	Best Cinematography	Dean Cundey	Nominated	
British Academy Film Awards	Best Editing	Arthur Schmidt	Nominated	
British Academy Film Awards	Best Production Design	Elliot Scott	Nominated	
British Academy Film Awards	Best Visual Effects	George Gibbs, Richard Williams, Ken Ralston, and Edward Jones	Won	
British Society of Cinematographers Awards	Best Cinematography in a Theatrical Feature Film	Dean Cundey	Nominated	
Cahiers du Cinéma	Best Film	Robert Zemeckis	5th Place	
César Awards	Best Foreign Film	Robert Zemeckis	Nominated	
Chicago Film Critics Association Awards	Best Director	Robert Zemeckis	Won	
David di Donatello Awards	Best Foreign Producer	Frank Marshall and Robert Watts	Won	
Directors Guild of America Awards	Outstanding Directorial Achievement in Motion Pictures	Robert Zemeckis	Nominated	
DVD Exclusive Awards	Best Menu Design	John Ross	Nominated	
Evening Standard British Film Awards	Best Actor	Bob Hoskins (also for The Lonely Passion of Judith Hearne)	Won	
Golden Globe Awards	Best Motion Picture – Musical or Comedy		Nominated	
Golden Globe Awards	Best Actor in a Motion Picture – Musical or Comedy	Bob Hoskins	Nominated	
Golden Reel Awards	Best Sound Editing – ADR	Larry Singer, Jessica Gallavan, Alan Nineberg, Charleen Richards, and Lionel Strutt	Won	
Golden Screen Awards			Won	
Grammy Awards	Best Album of Original Instrumental Background Score; Written for a Motion Picture or Television	Who Framed Roger Rabbit – Alan Silvestri	Nominated	
Hugo Awards	Best Dramatic Presentation	Robert Zemeckis, Jeffrey Price, Peter S. Seaman, and Gary K. Wolf	Won	
Jupiter Awards	Best International Film	Robert Zemeckis	Won	
Kids' Choice Awards	Favorite Movie		Won	
Los Angeles Film Critics Association Awards	Special Citation	Robert Zemeckis	Won	
National Film Preservation Board	National Film Registry		Inducted	
Online Film & Television Association Awards	Film Hall of Fame: Productions		Inducted	
Sant Jordi Awards	Best Foreign Film	Robert Zemeckis	Won	
Saturn Awards	Best Fantasy Film		Won	
Saturn Awards	Best Actor	Bob Hoskins	Nominated	
Saturn Awards	Best Supporting Actor	Christopher Lloyd	Nominated	
Saturn Awards	Best Supporting Actress	Joanna Cassidy	Nominated	
Saturn Awards	Best Director	Robert Zemeckis	Won	
Saturn Awards	Best Writing	Jeffrey Price and Peter S. Seaman	Nominated	
Saturn Awards	Best Music	Alan Silvestri	Nominated	
Saturn Awards	Best Special Effects	George Gibbs, Ken Ralston, and Richard Williams	Won	
Venice International Film Festival	Children and Cinema Award	Robert Zemeckis	Won	
Writers Guild of America Awards	Best Screenplay – Based on Material from Another Medium	Jeffrey Price and Peter S. Seaman	Nominated	

== Legacy ==
Who Framed Roger Rabbit marks the first and so far only time in animation history that characters from Disney's Mickey Mouse and Warner Bros' Looney Tunes franchises officially appeared on-screen together; in order for Disney to use Warner Bros.' characters for the film, both companies came to an agreement in which the screen time for the Warner Bros. characters would be equal to that of the Disney characters

The critical and commercial success of the film rekindled an interest in the golden age of American animation, and in addition to sparking the renaissance age of American animation and the Disney Renaissance, it has also gained a cult following. In November 1988, a few months after the film's release, Roger Rabbit made a guest appearance in the live-action/animated television special Mickey's 60th Birthday, meant to coincide with the 60th anniversary of Mickey Mouse. In 1991, Walt Disney Imagineering began to develop Mickey's Toontown for Disneyland, based on the Toontown that appeared in the film. The attraction also features a ride called Roger Rabbit's Car Toon Spin. Three theatrical animated shorts were also produced: Tummy Trouble was shown before Honey, I Shrunk the Kids (1989); Roller Coaster Rabbit was shown before Dick Tracy (1990); and Trail Mix-Up was shown before A Far Off Place (1993). The film also inspired a short-lived comic book and video game spin-offs, including two PC games, the Japanese version of The Bugs Bunny Crazy Castle (which features Roger instead of Bugs), a 1989 game released on the Nintendo Entertainment System, and a 1991 game released on the Game Boy.

In December 2016, the film was selected for preservation in the United States National Film Registry by the Library of Congress as "culturally, historically, or aesthetically significant".

Bob Hoskins' portrayal of Eddie Valiant and his interaction with the animated characters was praised, and he subsequently landed the role of Mario in the live-action film Super Mario Bros. (1993). Furthermore, the cartoonish aesthetic of the animated characters in the film served as inspiration for the design of the characters in Crash Bandicoot (1996).

While the film inspired Disney to produce other crossover-themed feature movies, such as Wreck-It Ralph (2012) and Chip 'n Dale: Rescue Rangers (2022), the premise of uniting cartoon characters as actors who interact with humans had a greater impact on Warner Bros., producing similar films such as Space Jam (1996), Looney Tunes: Back in Action (2003), Tom & Jerry (2021), and Coyote vs. Acme (2026).

=== Controversies ===
With the film's LaserDisc release, Variety first reported in March 1994 that observers uncovered several scenes of antics from the animators that supposedly featured brief nudity of Jessica Rabbit, including one animated by Colin White. While undetectable when played at the usual rate of 24 film frames per second, the LaserDisc player allowed the viewer to advance frame-by-frame to uncover these visuals. Whether or not they were actually intended to depict the nudity of the character remains unknown. Many retailers said that within minutes of the LaserDisc debut, their entire inventory was sold out. The run was fueled by media reports about the controversy, including stories on CNN and various newspapers.

Another frequently debated scene includes one in which Baby Herman extends his middle finger as he passes under a woman's dress and re-emerges with drool on his lip. In the scene where Daffy Duck and Donald Duck are dueling on pianos, some heard Donald call Daffy a "goddamn stupid nigger", rather than the scripted and recorded line "doggone stubborn little".

=== Legal issue ===
Gary K. Wolf, author of the novel Who Censored Roger Rabbit?, filed a lawsuit in 2001 against The Walt Disney Company. He claimed he was owed royalties based on the value of "gross receipts" and merchandising sales. In 2002, the trial court in the case ruled that these only referred to actual cash receipts Disney collected and denied Wolf's claim. In its January 2004 ruling, the California Court of Appeal disagreed, finding that expert testimony introduced by Wolf regarding the customary use of "gross receipts" in the entertainment business could support a broader reading of the term. The ruling vacated the trial court's order in favor of Disney and remanded the case for further proceedings. In a March 2005 hearing, Wolf estimated he was owed $7 million. Disney's attorneys not only disputed the claim but also said Wolf owed Disney $500,000–$1 million because of an accounting error discovered in preparing for the lawsuit. Wolf won the decision in 2005, receiving between $180,000 and $400,000 in damages.

=== Cancelled sequels ===
Spielberg discussed a sequel in 1989 with J. J. Abrams as writer and Zemeckis as producer. Abrams' outline was eventually abandoned. Nat Mauldin was hired to write a prequel titled Roger Rabbit: The Toon Platoon, set from 1941 to 1943. Similar to the previous film, Toon Platoon featured many cameo appearances by characters from the golden age of American animation. It began with Roger Rabbit's early years, living on a farm in the midwestern United States. With human Ritchie Davenport, Roger travels west to seek his mother, in the process meeting Jessica Krupnick (his future wife), a struggling Hollywood actress. While Roger and Ritchie are enlisting in the Army, Jessica is kidnapped and forced to make pro-Nazi German broadcasts. Roger and Ritchie must save her by going into Nazi-occupied Europe accompanied by several other Toons in their Army platoon. After their triumph, Roger and Ritchie are given a Hollywood Boulevard parade, and Roger is finally reunited with his mother, and his father, Bugs Bunny.

Mauldin later retitled his script Who Discovered Roger Rabbit. Spielberg left the project when deciding he could not satirize Nazis after directing Schindler's List. Eisner commissioned a rewrite in 1997 with Sherri Stoner and Deanna Oliver. Although they kept Roger's search for his mother, Stoner and Oliver replaced the WWII subplot with Roger's inadvertent rise to stardom on Broadway and Hollywood. Disney was impressed and Alan Menken was hired along with Glenn Slater to write five songs for the film and offered his services as executive producer. One of the songs, "This Only Happens in the Movies", was recorded in 2008 on the debut album of Broadway actress Kerry Butler. Eric Goldberg was set to be the new animation director, and began to redesign Roger's new character appearance.

Spielberg became busy establishing DreamWorks, so James Pentecost was set to be the producer, collaborating with remaining producers Frank Marshall and Kathleen Kennedy. Test footage for Who Discovered Roger Rabbit was shot sometime in 1998 at the Disney animation unit in Lake Buena Vista, Florida; the results were a mix of CGI, traditional animation, and live-action that did not please Disney. A second test had the toons completely converted to CGI. The tests were animated by Tom Bancroft, Barry Temple, Trey Finney, David Nethery, Sherrie Sinclair, James Harris, Teresa Quezada, Jason Peltz, Lon Smart, Eric Guaglione, Rob Bekhurs, and Guner Behich. The second test was dropped as the film's projected budget would escalate past $100 million. Eisner felt it was best to cancel the film. In March 2003, producer Don Hahn doubted a sequel, arguing that public tastes had changed since the 1990s with the rise of computer animation. "There was something very special about that time when animation was not as much in the forefront as it is now."

In December 2007, Marshall stated that he was still "open" to the idea, and in April 2009, Zemeckis revealed he was still interested. According to a 2009 MTV News story, Jeffrey Price and Peter S. Seaman were writing a new script for the project, and the animated characters would be in traditional two-dimensional, while the rest would be in motion capture. In 2010, Bob Hoskins had agreed to sign on for a sequel, but expressed scepticism about the use of "performance capture" in the film. Zemeckis said that the sequel would remain hand-drawn animated and live-action sequences will be filmed, just like in the original film, but the lighting effects on the cartoon characters and some of the props that the toons handle will be done digitally. Also in 2010, Hahn, who was the film's original associate producer, confirmed the sequel's development in an interview with Empire. He stated, "Yeah, I couldn't possibly comment. I deny completely, but yeah... if you're a fan, pretty soon you're going to be very, very, very happy." Hoskins retired from acting in 2012 after a Parkinson's disease diagnosis a year earlier, and died from pneumonia in 2014. Marshall confirmed that the film would be a prequel, similar to earlier drafts, and that the writing was almost complete. During an interview at the premiere of his film Flight, Zemeckis stated that the sequel was still possible, despite Hoskins' absence, and the script for the sequel was sent to Disney for approval.

In February 2013, Gary K. Wolf, writer of the original novel, said Erik Von Wodtke and he were working on a development proposal for an animated Disney buddy comedy starring Mickey Mouse and Roger Rabbit called The Stooge, based on the 1952 film of the same name. The proposed film was to be a prequel, taking place five years before Who Framed Roger Rabbit and part of the story is about how Roger met Jessica. Wolf has stated the film was wending its way through Disney.

In November 2016, while promoting his film Allied in England, Zemeckis stated that the sequel "moves the story of Roger and Jessica Rabbit into the next few years of period film, moving on from film noir to the world of the 1950s". He also stated that the sequel would feature a "digital Bob Hoskins", as Eddie Valiant would return in "ghost form". While the director went on to state that the script was "terrific" and the film would still use hand-drawn animation, Zemeckis thinks that the chances of Disney green-lighting the sequel are "slim". As he explained more in detail, "The current corporate Disney culture has no interest in Roger, and they certainly don't like Jessica at all". In December 2018, while promoting his film Welcome to Marwen and given the 30th anniversary of Who Framed Roger Rabbit, Zemeckis reiterated in an interview with Yahoo! Movies that though the sequel's script was "wonderful", Disney was still unlikely to ever produce it, and he did not see the possibility of producing it as an original film for the streaming service Disney+, as he felt that it does not make any sense as there was no "Princess" in it. In November 2024, while promoting his latest film Here, Zemeckis again said that one of the reasons Disney would never produce the script, "as good as it is", was that Disney finds Jessica Rabbit "too hot", citing that they dressed her in a trench coat in the Disneyland attraction Roger Rabbit's Car Toon Spin. Zemeckis said that the original film was made at the right time. In 2025, Gary K. Wolf noted in an interview that all the rights to Roger Rabbit and associated characters had returned to him. Wolf stated at the time that he was working on a film adaptation of his novel Jessica Rabbit: XERIOUS Business.

== See also ==
- List of films featuring fictional films

== Bibliography ==
- Anderson, Ross (2019). Pulling a Rabbit Out of a Hat: The Making of Roger Rabbit. University Press of Mississippi. ISBN 978-1-496-82230-7.
- Kagan, Norman (2003). "Who Framed Roger Rabbit". The Cinema of Robert Zemeckis. Lanham, Maryland: Rowman & Littlefield. pp. 93–117. ISBN 0-87833-293-6.
- Stewart, James B. (2005). DisneyWar. New York: Simon & Schuster. ISBN 0-684-80993-1.
- Williams, Richard (2001). The Animator's Survival Kit. Faber and Faber. ISBN 0-5712-0228-4.
- Bonifer, Mike (June 1989). The Art of Who Framed Roger Rabbit. First Glance Books. ISBN 0-9622588-0-6.
- Foster, Bob (1989). Roger Rabbit: The Resurrection of Doom. Comic book sequel between Who Framed Roger Rabbit and the theatrical short Tummy Trouble. Marvel Comics. ISBN 0-87135-593-0.
- Noble, Martin (December 1988). Who Framed Roger Rabbit. Novelization of the film. Virgin Books. ISBN 0-352-32389-2.
- Wolf, Gary K. (July 1991). Who P-P-P-Plugged Roger Rabbit?. Spin-off from the film and Wolf's Who Censored Roger Rabbit?. Villard. ISBN 978-0-679-40094-3.
