= Who Framed Roger Rabbit (1988 video game) =

- Developer: Silent Software
- Publisher: Buena Vista Software
- Composer: Jim Andron
- Platforms: MS-DOS, Amiga, Atari ST, Apple II, Commodore 64
- Release: NA: July 26, 1988; EU: December 31, 1988
- Genre: Action
- Mode: Single-player

Who Framed Roger Rabbit is a video game based on the film of the same name for MS-DOS, Amiga, Atari ST, Apple II, and Commodore 64. It was released by Buena Vista Software in 1988, and was the first video game directly published by Disney themselves.

== Gameplay ==
The player controls Roger Rabbit through four levels, each with its own specific task to complete.

In the first level, the player must drive Benny the Cab to reach the Ink and Paint Club before the Toon Patrol, jumping and swerving to avoid cars and puddles of Dip on the road. The second level is set within the club; here, the player must pick up all the sheets of paper being laid on the tables by the penguin waiters, since one of them is Marvin Acme's will. However, the player has to avoid picking up whiskey drinks or being grabbed by the club's gorilla bouncer. The third level is another race against the Toon Patrol to Acme's Gag Factory, and the fourth requires the player to use various joke items to get past the weasels, stop Doom, and save Roger's wife Jessica from being obliterated by Doom's Dip cannon.

The box includes a short catalog of items available in the final level, providing the player with hints on how to complete the game.

== Reception ==
Compute! stated that Roger Rabbit was "as entertaining as it is exciting" with good graphics, sound, and "several hours of pleasurable playing".

== See also ==
- Who Framed Roger Rabbit (1989 video game)
