= Jessica Rabbit =

Fictional character in Who Censored Roger Rabbit? and Who Framed Roger Rabbit

- Who Censored Roger Rabbit? and Who Framed Roger Rabbit character
- Jessica Rabbit as she appeared in Who Framed Roger Rabbit (1988)
- First appearance: Who Censored Roger Rabbit? (1981)
- Created by: Gary K. Wolf
- Adapted by: Jeffrey Price; Peter S. Seaman; Richard Williams
- Voiced by: Kathleen Turner (1988−present; speaking voice) (uncredited in film); Amy Irving (1988; singing voice); Russi Taylor (1983; original test footage); Patricia Parris (1988; Who Framed Roger Rabbit Read-Along Storybook); Marnie Mosiman (1991−1994; Hare Raising Havoc, Roger Rabbit's Car Toon Spin); Lisa Rohr Sterbakov (2009; Robot Chicken); Felicia Day (2018; Robot Chicken)
- Performance model: Betsy Brantley

In-universe information
- Alias: Jessica Krupnick
- Species: Toon human
- Occupation: Actress and performer at The Ink and Paint Club
- Spouse: Roger Rabbit (husband)

Jessica Rabbit (née Krupnick) is a fictional character in the novel Who Censored Roger Rabbit? and its film adaptation, Who Framed Roger Rabbit. She is depicted as the human-cartoon wife of Roger Rabbit in various Roger Rabbit media. Jessica is renowned as one of the best-known sex symbols in animation.

== Development ==
=== Novel ===
Author Gary K. Wolf based Jessica primarily on the cartoon character Red from Tex Avery's Red Hot Riding Hood, though he also based her attitude on Tinker Bell and her design on Margaret Kerry.

=== Film ===
The film version of the character was inspired by various actresses. Richard Williams explained, "I tried to make her like Rita Hayworth, we took her hair from Veronica Lake, and Robert Zemeckis kept saying, 'What about the look Lauren Bacall had?'" He described that combination as an "ultimate male fantasy, drawn by a cartoonist". Before Zemeckis was brought on board as director, Jessica had a different design, and was to be voiced by Russi Taylor. Taylor would go on to provide the voice in test footage from 1981. When Zemeckis was hired, he brought along Kathleen Turner to voice Jessica, whom he had worked with in Romancing the Stone. In a 2017 interview, Turner, who went uncredited, stated that she accepted the role because she was pregnant and "just had to show up and do her voice".

== Character synopsis ==
=== Novel ===
As a character, Roger's wife is dramatically different between adaptations. In the novel, Jessica is an immoral, up-and-coming star and former comic character with whom her estranged husband (comic strip star Roger Rabbit) has become obsessed. She's depicted as a shameless gold-digger, relying on her looks and charisma to seduce men into doing her bidding or pitting key political figures against each other. Beneath her charismatic glamour lies a petty and hard-to-please diva. When she's finished, she promptly monkey-branches to gain access to another man's wealth and power.

=== Film ===
Voiced by Kathleen Turner, the film re-imagines her as sultry yet intelligent, moral, and kind-hearted. She's a cartoon singer at a Los Angeles supper club called The Ink and Paint Club. She is one of several suspects in the framing of her husband, a famous cartoon star accused of murder. Amy Irving was cast to sing "Why Don't You Do Right?" (a blues song made famous by Peggy Lee) for Jessica's first scene in the movie. According to animation director Richard Williams, other than being a flirty, passionate and cunning, long legged female human toon temptress, she deeply loves her husband Roger. She calls him her "honey-bunny" and "darling." She claims that he makes her laugh, is a better lover than a driver and that he is "better than Goofy" after Roger attempts to save her from Judge Doom and the Toon Patrol. As proof of her love, she tells Eddie that she will pay any price for Roger and she even helps prove him innocent by helping in the investigation.

Even though she is a redhead stunner, Jessica is shown to have a few of the comedic cartoon antics typical of other Toons. One such example is her cleavage having a hammerspace ability, as one of the weasels searches her (with obvious perverted intent) for Marvin Acme's last will and testament, only comically to get his hand caught in a bear trap, with Valiant commenting on the event with a pun ("Nice booby trap"). Another could be her restrained "wild take" (as she shouts, "Oh, my God, it's Dip!") seeing Judge Doom's scheme involving the Dip, while a subtle effect was added by animator Russell Hall: The bounce of Jessica's bosom was reversed from that of a real woman so that it would bounce up when a real woman's breasts bounce down and vice versa. Furthermore, when she blows kisses (to Eddie as seen in one scene) the lip-kisses are also done in a cartoonish style.

=== Shorts ===
After the film, Jessica also appeared in the Roger Rabbit/Baby Herman cartoons Tummy Trouble as a nurse, Roller Coaster Rabbit as a damsel in distress, and Trail Mix-Up as a park ranger. Although in Tummy Trouble and Roller Coaster Rabbit, she rarely made impressions, in Trail Mix-Up, Roger fantasizes over her, calling her a "babe in the woods" and panting like a dog. She also appeared frequently in the Roger Rabbit comic book series, and she had her own feature in most issues of Roger Rabbit's Toontown such as "Beauty Parlor Bedlam," where she comes face to face with female weasel counterpart, Winnie.

=== Cameos ===
In the 1996 Disney film Aladdin and the King of Thieves, a cardboard cut-out of her body (from the neck-down) was visible for a few seconds while Genie was picking wedding dresses for Princess Jasmine, to which he did the Wolf-whistle. She was mentioned in the 1991 Tiny Toon Adventures episode "New Character Day," while her legs were briefly seen out a limo door in the episode "Buster and Babs Go Hawaiian."

== Prequel novel and adaptation ==
In May 2022, Gary K. Wolf, the original creator of Roger Rabbit, published Jessica Rabbit: XERIOUS Business, which explores Jessica's origin story. In 2024, Wolf quietly won the rights for his characters from Disney, due to the 35-Year Copyright Reversion Clause. He said that the first thing he wants to develop is a live-action movie adaptation of XERIOUS Business.

== Legacy ==
With the success of the film and upon the opening of Disney's Hollywood Studios on May 1, 1989, the film's characters featured prominently in the company. After taking the Studio Backlot Tour, various props decorated the streets including two different photo opportunities with Jessica: a glittery cardboard cutout and "The Loony Bin" photo shop which allowed you to take pictures in costume standing next to an actual cartoon drawing of characters from the film. There was also a plethora of merchandise including Jessica Rabbit rub-on stickers called "pressers". The Jessica Rabbit Store, entitled "Jessica's", was once part of Pleasure Island, Disney's nightclub attraction and shopping area. The store included a giant two-sided neon Jessica sign with sequined dress and swinging leg and featured nothing but Jessica Rabbit merchandise. The store closed in 1992.

Her line "I'm not bad, I'm just drawn that way" became one of the most popular quotes from the film, and was nominated as one of the 400 greatest movie quotes by AFI's 100 Years...100 Movie Quotes, ultimately failing to make the final list. Jessica Rabbit was named number six on Empire's list of the 50 Best Animated Movie Characters in 2010.

The music video for British musician, DJ and producer Mark Ronson's cover of "Oh My God" (originally by the British indie rock band Kaiser Chiefs) from his 2007 covers album Version featuring Lily Allen on vocals, was directed by Nima Nourizadeh and primarily parodies Jessica's performance of "Why Don't You Do Right", depicts Ronson as a stand-in for Eddie Valiant finishing an evening of mixing and receiving an invitation to and attending a performance by a cartoon version of Allen (designed by French illustrator Fafi, as Allen herself was unable to appear in the video) at an Ink and Paint club stand-in, performing the song and flirting with the audience members. Of notice is that, in the video, "Lily Allen" is the only toon present. Most of the toons that worked at the club (the octopus bartender, the penguin waiters, Bongo the Gorilla and Betty Boop) have all been replaced by real people. The video also features cameos from Australian singer and frequent collaborator of Ronson's, Daniel Merriweather and the Kaiser Chiefs themselves, who also appear as audience members. The video concludes with "Allen" blowing a cartoonish kiss to the Kaiser Chiefs, a reference to another scene from the film where Jessica blows a similar kiss to Valiant.

Kathleen Turner, the original speaking voice of Jessica Rabbit, stated in a 2017 interview that she is asked more often to sign photos of Jessica Rabbit than herself.

== Reception ==
Jessica Rabbit has received positive reviews and is described as a sex symbol among classic animated characters, commonly ranked among other animated characters such as Betty Boop and Red Hot Riding Hood. According to research by Cadbury Dairy Milk, Jessica Rabbit remains the most alluring character in cartoons. Her red dress was also among the most recognized clothing worn by an animated character along with Snow White's dress. In 2008, Jessica Rabbit was selected by Empire as one of The 100 Greatest Movie Characters of All-Time, explaining that despite being drawn as a classic femme fatale, one of the movie's strengths is to allow the character to play against the stereotype". She was also ranked as the sixth greatest animated character by the same magazine stating that "there's more to her than just the sort of lines that would clean sweep America's Next Top Model. There's a pure heart and ready wit beneath that magnificent exterior." Internet Movie Database had a poll that ranked her as the most alluring Disney character according to votes from audiences of the page.

=== Nudity and impact on LaserDisc release ===
With the LaserDisc release of Who Framed Roger Rabbit, Variety reported in March 1994 that Jessica was depicted nude for a few frames of animation, undetectable when played at the usual rate of 24 film frames per second, but visible when advancing through the film frame-by-frame; Snopes examined it, and reported that although a scene does exist where Jessica's dress is hiked up and her underwear disappears for a few frames, it could be either intentional or a coloration error. The scene drove sales of the LaserDisc release: many retailers reported that due to reports on the nudity from media including CNN and newspapers, their entire inventories of the LaserDisc release sold out in minutes. Sources from Disney told Variety that the company was unlikely to do anything about the frames, and that the film is not intended for children regardless.
