= Jeffrey Price and Peter S. Seaman =

American filmmaking team

Jeffrey Price
- Born: Jeffrey Lawrence Price; December 18, 1949 (age 76); Riverside, California, U.S.
- Occupations: Screenwriter, film producer
- Years active: 1983 – present
- Spouse: Jennie Franks (m. 1977)
- Children: 2

Peter S. Seaman
- Born: Peter Stewart Seaman; October 26, 1951 (age 74); Chicago, Illinois, U.S.
- Occupations: Screenwriter, film producer
- Years active: 1983 – present
- Spouse: Margaret "Nini" Swift (m. 1968)
- Children: 1

Jeffrey Lawrence Price (born December 18, 1949) and Peter Stewart Seaman (born October 26, 1951) are an American screenwriting and producing duo whose notable works include Trenchcoat (1983), Who Framed Roger Rabbit (1988), Doc Hollywood (1991), Wild Wild West (1999), How the Grinch Stole Christmas (2000), Last Holiday (2006), and Shrek the Third (2007).

== Filmography ==
=== Film ===
| Year | Title | Notes |
|---|---|---|
| 1983 | Trenchcoat | |
| 1988 | Who Framed Roger Rabbit | Nominated - BAFTA Award for Best Adapted Screenplay |
| 1991 | Doc Hollywood | With Daniel Pyne |
| 1999 | Wild Wild West | With S. S. Wilson and Brent Maddock; Golden Raspberry Award for Worst Screenplay |
| 2000 | How the Grinch Stole Christmas | Nominated - Golden Raspberry Award for Worst Screenplay |
| 2006 | Last Holiday | |
| 2007 | Shrek the Third | With Chris Miller and Aron Warner |

=== Television ===
| Year | Title | Notes |
|---|---|---|
| 1990 | Tales from the Crypt | Episodes "For Cryin' Out Loud" and "My Brother's Keeper" |
| 1993 | Johnny Bago | Also creators |
