= Judge Doom =

Character in Who Framed Roger Rabbit

- Who Framed Roger Rabbit character
- Christopher Lloyd as Judge Doom in Who Framed Roger Rabbit (1988)
- First appearance: Who Framed Roger Rabbit (1988)
- Created by: Jeffrey Price; Peter S. Seaman
- Portrayed by: Christopher Lloyd
- Voiced by: Corey Burton (Who Framed Roger Rabbit Read-Along Storybook)

In-universe information
- Alias: Baron Von Rotten
- Species: Toon disguised as a human
- Occupation: Judge

Judge Doom is a fictional character and the main antagonist in the 1988 film Who Framed Roger Rabbit, portrayed by Christopher Lloyd. He is depicted as the much-feared, cruel and evil judge of Toontown, who later in the film is revealed as the mastermind behind the framing of the titular character and the murder of protagonist Eddie Valiant's brother.

Judge Doom is an original character from the script of the film created by screenwriters Jeffrey Price and Peter S. Seaman. Tim Curry auditioned for the role before Lloyd was cast as the character. Judge Doom later appeared in Who Framed Roger Rabbit media, becoming the final boss of video game adaptations of the film and in a graphic novel sequel explaining his backstory and revival. Merchandise of the character was also sold.

Judge Doom has had many comparisons with characters from other fictional media, and his motives and actions have drawn parallels with real-world historical events.

Christopher Lloyd's role as Judge Doom has been praised as a film villain, with the character appearing as one of the greatest film villains of all time by Wizard magazine and appearing in other related film villain media lists. The character and his plot twist reveal as a toon are commonly rated as some of the scariest moments in a family-oriented non-horror film.

The character has been widely acknowledged in popular culture, being referenced in a song, a documentary and a 2021 viral Twitter joke regarding NFL player Tom Brady.

== Creation and concept ==
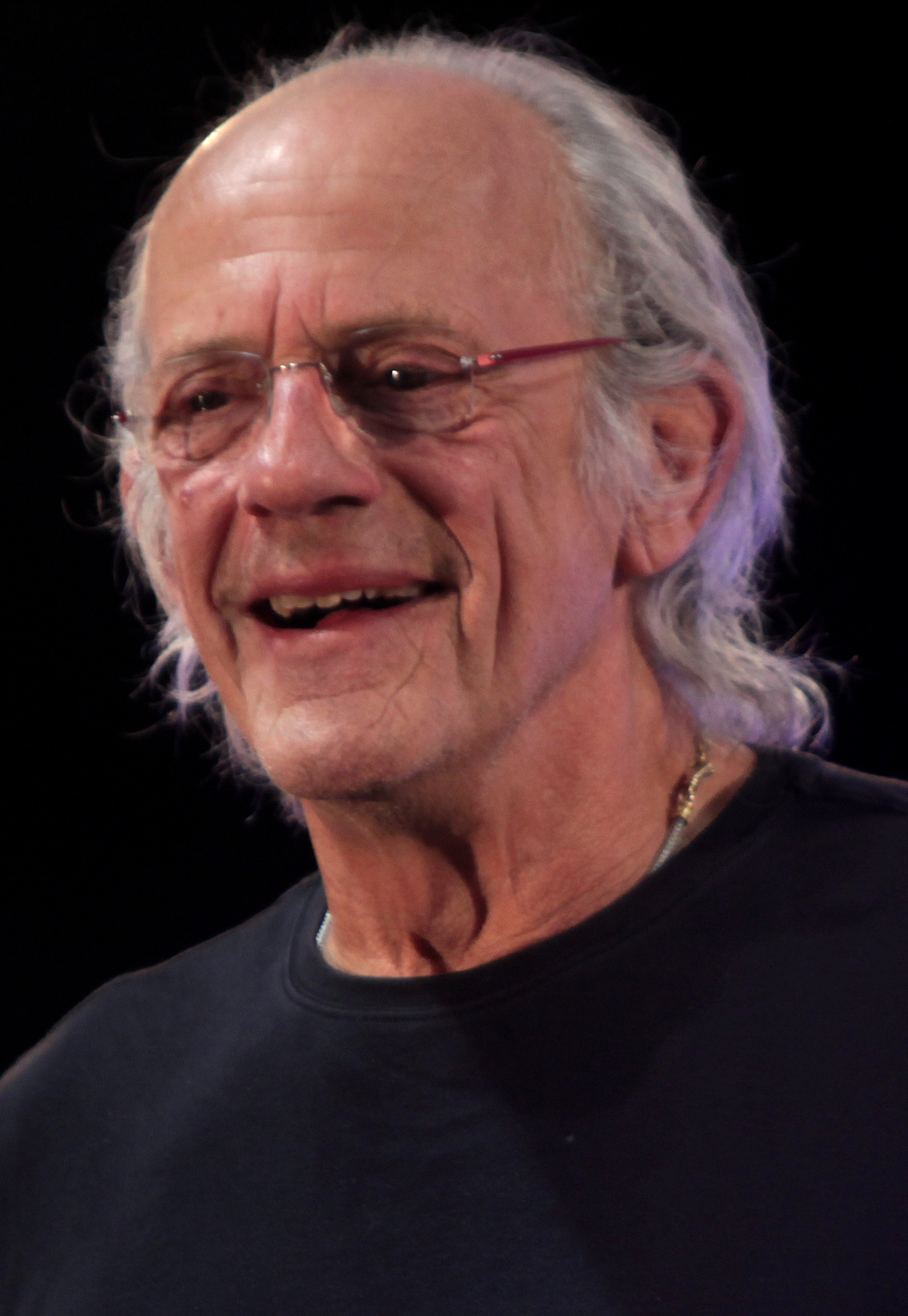
Christopher Lloyd (pictured in 2015) portrayed Judge Doom in Who Framed Roger Rabbit.

=== Writing ===
During the writing process in summer 1986, Jeffrey Price and Peter S. Seaman were unsure of whom to include as the villain in the plot of Who Framed Roger Rabbit. They wrote scripts that had either Jessica Rabbit or Baby Herman as the villain, but they made their final decision with the newly created character Judge Doom. Price and Seaman based the scheme of Judge Doom of destroying Toontown for a freeway on a planned unproduced sequel of Chinatown entitled Cloverleaf, which would be the name of Judge Doom's company in the film. Doom was supposed to have an animated vulture sit on his shoulder, but this was deleted due to the technical challenges this posed. Doom would also have a suitcase of twelve small toon kangaroos that act as a jury, by having their joeys pop out of their pouches, each with letters, which when put together would spell "You are guilty". This was also cut. Doom was originally intended in the script to be revealed as the offscreen anonymous hunter who killed Bambi's mother (referred to as "man" in Bambi and also named as such by the American Film Institute) but everyone at Disney rejected the idea.

=== Casting ===
Tim Curry originally auditioned for the role of Judge Doom in August, 1986, but the producers found him too terrifying for the role.

Christopher Lloyd was cast because he previously worked with Robert Zemeckis and Amblin Entertainment on Back to the Future in his most famous role as Emmett Brown. Lloyd shaved his hair for the role and also avoided blinking his eyes while on camera to perfectly portray the character. According to Lloyd:

"I just felt a toon doesn't have to blink their eyes to remoisten their eyeballs. They're not human, so I just felt Judge Doom should never blink. It makes him even more ominous, scarier if he's just looking like that. It wasn't really difficult, I'd just keep my eyes open as long as I could, try to time it out with the next take and all that. It was cool. I just like to find little things that make him even eviler, and that was that.

Lloyd used the black-colored spy in Mad magazine's comic strip Spy vs. Spy as a rough guide of what the character would look like during development.

== Depiction ==
=== Character overview ===
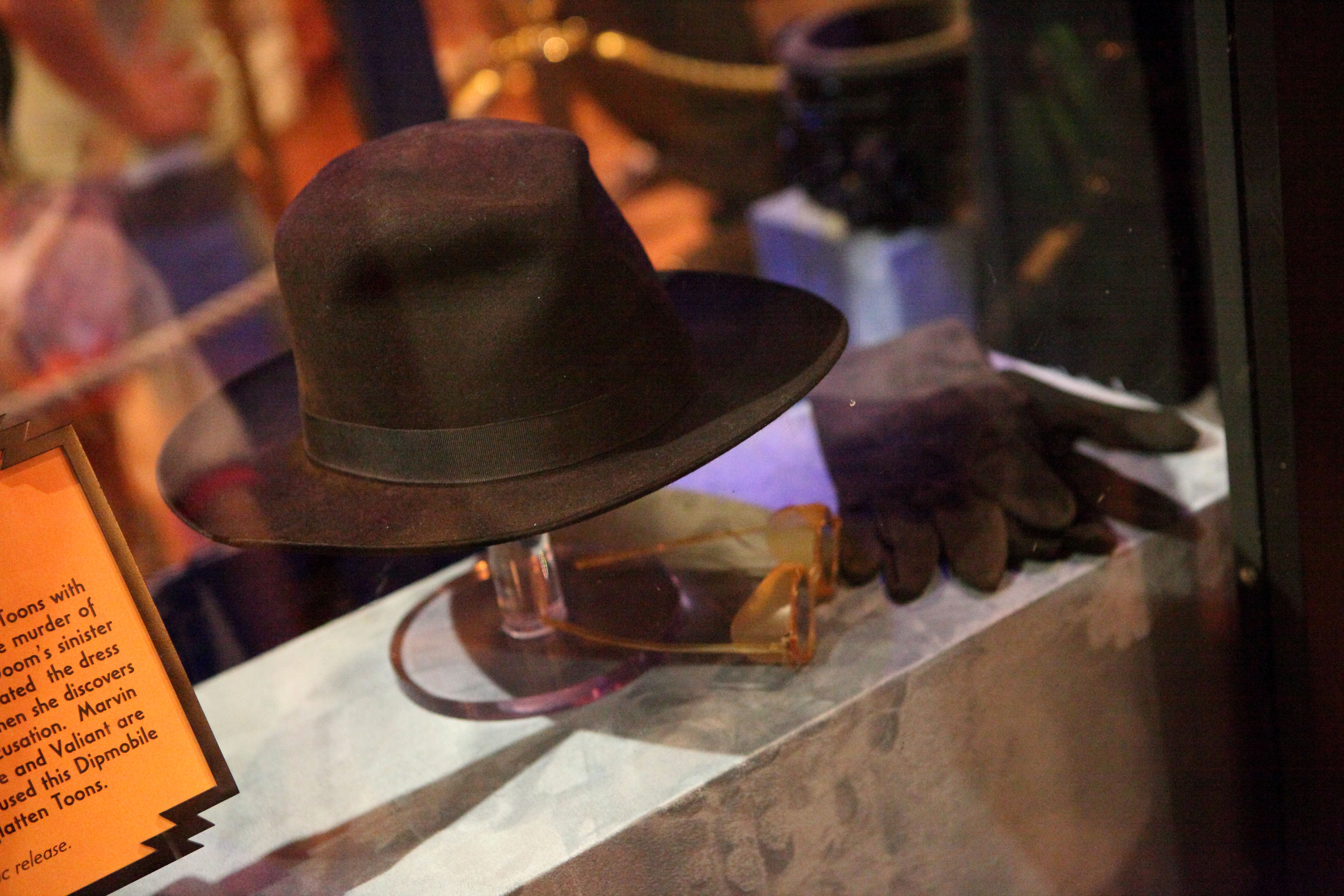
The props of the character's hat, glove and sunglasses used in the film in The Great Movie Ride at Disney's Hollywood Studios

In Who Framed Roger Rabbit, Doom is the much-feared Judge of Toontown. Despite presiding over a city of Toons, Doom is totally without mirth or redeeming qualities and passes capital punishment on Toons who break the law, using a chemical mixture of turpentine, acetone and benzene which he dubs "the Dip" to destroy them.

Doom wears a black ensemble which includes a caped overcoat, which seems to always blow in the wind, even indoors, fedora, gloves and rimless yellow-tinted glasses; he also carries a pocket watch, as well as a cane which is revealed to be a sabre in disguise, for use in emergency situations. This appearance is reminiscent of agents of the real-life Gestapo, the secret police of Nazi Germany.

Doom employs his toon weasel henchmen, the Toon Patrol, to assist him in hunting down Roger Rabbit for the murder of Marvin Acme.

=== Role in film ===
When Judge Doom is introduced, Lieutenant Santino confides to Eddie Valiant that Doom bought the election as judge of Toontown. Doom threatens to act as executioner to Roger Rabbit with a mixture of turpentine, acetone and benzene he dubs "the Dip" and showcases its purpose by destroying a toon shoe with it in front of Eddie. Roger realizes he is in trouble with Doom after him and begs Eddie to hide him. Later, at the Terminal Bar, Doom uses the "Shave and a Haircut" trick to lure Roger out, then prepares to execute him. After a brief scuffle inside the bar, the Judge orders the weasels to capture Roger and Eddie. When Eddie learns that studio head R.K. Maroon is connected to the plot to frame Roger, Eddie interrogates him, but Maroon pleads that he is "a dead man" if he confesses. Just as Maroon is about to do so, he is shot dead by an unseen assailant who nearly does the same to Eddie as well.

Shave and a Haircut Door Knock
Judge Doom referenced the classic Shave and Haircut bit (as shown above) in the film while using the tapping of his cane.

Upon chasing the assailant to Toontown, Eddie catches Jessica Rabbit, thinking she is the culprit, but she reveals that Judge Doom was the one who murdered Acme and Maroon. At the film's climax, Doom traps Eddie, Jessica and Roger in the Acme Factory to explain his scheme to destroy Toontown using a giant and mobile vat of Dip linked to a high-pressure water cannon and then build a freeway in its place. Doom then plans to retire from being a judge and control all the profits from the new road system as he additionally reveals that he is the sole shareholder of Cloverleaf Industries, having bought the trolley network for the sole purpose of putting it out of production. He then orders Jessica and Roger to be tied up and raised into the air via skyhook to be sprayed by the Dip cannon.

Eddie distracts the weasels using hilarious antics to make them laugh themselves to death, then attempts to rescue Roger and Jessica when he is interrupted by Doom. The duo then square off, dueling with various Acme props. During the fight, Doom is run over by a steamroller but does not die as expected, being flattened into a flimsy paper-thin shape and revealing him to be a toon wearing an assortment of fake props to disguise himself. Doom reinflates himself with a nearby helium tank revealing bulging red eyes and a high-pitched voice to Eddie, who recognizes Doom as an escaped bank robber from Toontown, thus explaining how Doom managed to buy the judicial election and the trolley network, and the very toon who murdered his brother, Teddy Valiant, by dropping a piano on him long ago.

Doom attempts to use his toon abilities to finish off Eddie, only to be outsmarted and defeated by the latter as he ultimately destroys him with his own Dip concoction. A crowd of various toons then surround the remnants of his disguise and wonder what kind of toon he was. The toons seem to agree that they do not need to know before rejoicing as Marvin Acme's will suddenly appears in Roger's possession, granting them full ownership of Toontown.

=== Role in graphic novel ===
Judge Doom appears in the graphic novel Roger Rabbit: The Resurrection of Doom, which takes place after the film and establishes his origin.

In the graphic novel, Roger and Jessica Rabbit watch a documentary which explains that Doom was originally a toon named Baron Von Rotten who took up portraying antagonists in film until suffering a concussion in an accident, from which he awakened believing he was a real villain. Von Rotten thus began his criminal career by robbing the First National Bank of Toontown, followed by his murder of Theodore 'Teddy' Valiant by dropping a piano on him and then spreading the stolen money all over the town in order to buy the election for Judge of Toontown, where he then assumed the alias of Judge Doom.

The spin-off graphic novel also reveals that a trio of toon weasels who happen to be connected with the "Toon Patrol", the weasel henchmen from Who Framed Roger Rabbit, revive the villain using old model drawings and cartoon cels after watching the documentary for inspiration. When revived, Doom plans to avenge himself of Roger Rabbit by ruining his professional life. He does this by disguising himself as CB Maroon and being responsible for slandering the newspaper of the character. Eddie Valiant traces this scheme to CB Maroon. Doom reveals his grand scheme to acquire and close down Maroon Cartoons entirely, and then kill the rabbit. The weasel henchmen then capture Valiant and he is thrown in a vault revealing the real CB Maroon, who was being kept out of the way until the sale went through. Roger and Jessica eventually free both Valiant and Maroon. Despite this, the heroes found they were too late to stop Doom from acquiring Maroon Cartoons. Panicking, Valiant pulled a gun on Doom which was believed to be a water gun at first but turns out to be Dip which melts both Doom and the weasels once again.

=== Other media and merchandise ===
Judge Doom appears as the final boss of the 1988 video game adaption of the film, the 1989 one and the 1991 one.

LJN released film merchandise of the character with the pet vulture that was scrapped during production. Doom and Eddie Valiant were both playable characters in the action board game Who Framed Roger Rabbit: Dip Flip. In the game, one player plays Judge Doom to dip as many toons as they can while another player plays Eddie Valiant trying to save the toons. A Funko action figure of Judge Doom with his Toon eyes along with him holding the anthropomorphic shoe that he dips in Who Framed Roger Rabbit was released by The Walt Disney Company as part of the Roger Rabbit lineup.

== Themes and analysis ==
=== Scheme metaphor ===
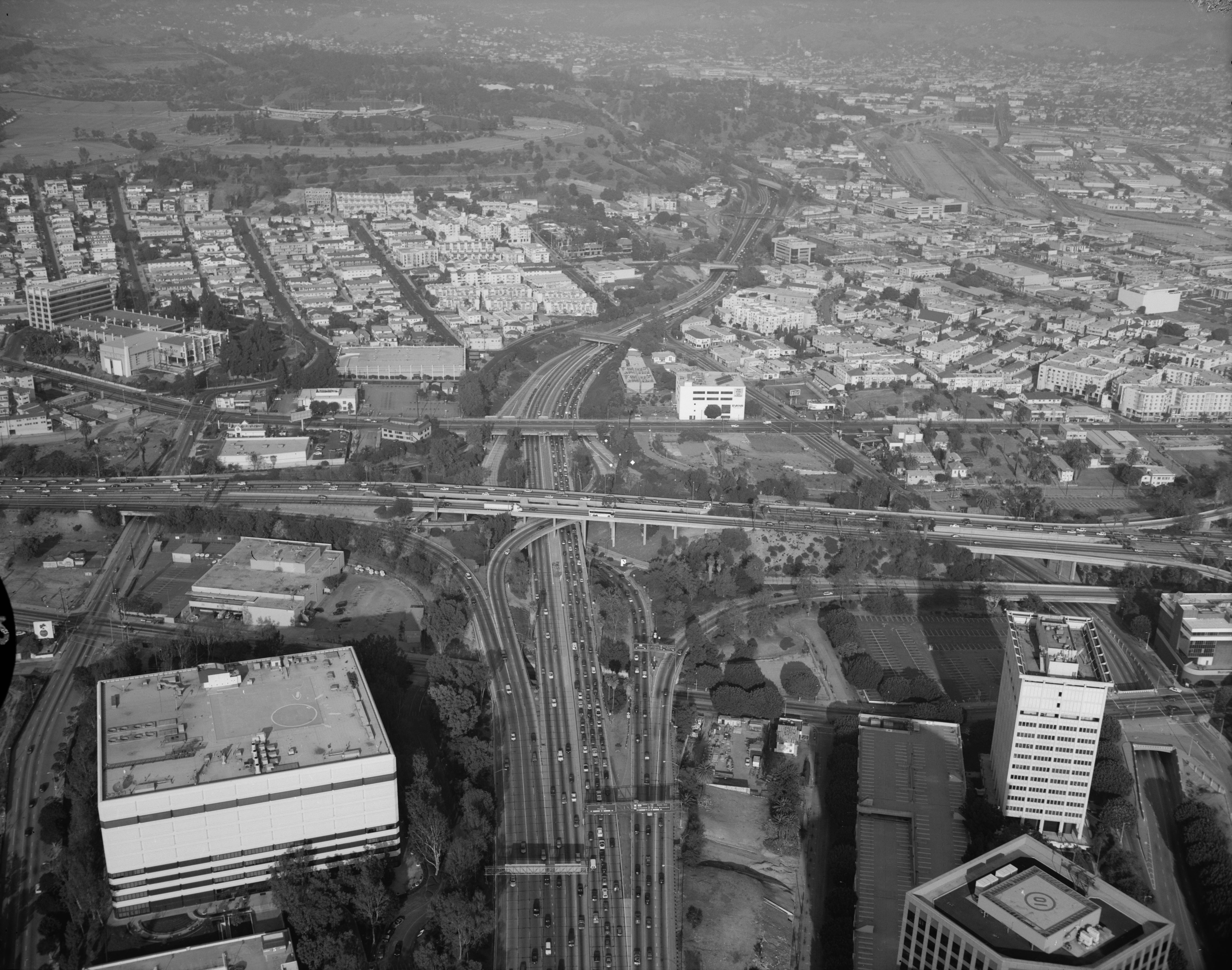
(Left) The Pacific Electric logo. Owner of the red car that Doom bought to dismantle. (Right) The historical Four Level Interchange of the Arroyo Seco Parkway. An early example in history reminiscent of Doom's plan to destroy Toontown for a freeway that connects Los Angeles to Pasadena for progress of economy.

Judge Doom's scheme is ultimately based on the development of the existing Southern California freeways. The film is set in 1947, where Judge Doom plans to destroy Toontown over building a freeway and buy off the Pacific Electric railway to dismantle it. According to him it will boost automotive businesses. The motivation is a nod to the General Motors streetcar conspiracy in which many companies conspired to push an automobile future for Greater Los Angeles which ultimately helped bring down Pacific Electric. The scheme within the film has been cited as a metaphor behind the history of automobiles and the economy of the technological age by various authors such as James Howard Kunstler in the book The Geography of Nowhere. Dave Kehr of the Chicago Tribune compared Judge Doom's evil scheme to the plot of Chinatown, as did film critic Emily St. James, who added L.A. Confidential to her mix of comparisons as well.

=== Actor analysis ===
Christopher Lloyd likened his part as Doom to his previous role as the Klingon commander Kruge in Star Trek III: The Search for Spock, both being overly evil characters which he considered being "fun to play". Scenes like the Evil Queen as the witch in Snow White and the Seven Dwarfs and Bambi are labeled as examples of scary childhood moments for Lloyd. Because of that, Lloyd admitted that the tragic shoe scene was his favorite scene to perform within the film, calling it payback from the original Disney films that he was "traumatized" or terrified of. Lloyd added:

Doom was such a dark character. I've had so many people come up to me over the years to tell me that when they were kids that movie scared the hell out of them — really kind of terrified them. But I remember as a kid watching those original Walt Disney animated films that terrified me, and I think that is part of what makes those films so appealing. So it's fun and a bit of sweet revenge to be the villain — the fun, dark part of the movie. Also, Judge Doom turns out to be a toon, so I don't think you can get too upset with a toon — since they're entertaining and fun.

=== The Dip and demise comparison ===
Turpentine, acetone and benzene combined form Judge Doom's fictional liquid that he refers to as "the Dip" that destroys toons and ultimately does the same to himself. In real life they are paint thinners. Jenna Stoeber of Polygon felt that the Dip was a scary part of many childhoods. She opined "the Dip is just paint thinner, able to instantly dissolve a painted Toon into nothingness. For a child, that is a fundamental threat". She added, "the horror of the Dip is uniquely adolescent, threatening to obliterate all of a child’s favorite creatures" and further described it for that reason as "pure terror". Film director, Robert Zemeckis, compared Judge Doom's invention of the Dip, that intended to eliminate all toons, to Adolf Hitler's Final Solution. It's possible that Judge Doom hides as a human, because Toons have zero power in his world, making him sort of a fake Übermensch, craving power and authority. According to film critic Jonathan Rosenbaum, the filmmakers originally intended to name the Dip the Final Solution.

Judge Doom's demise where he melts from the Dip is often referenced as an allusion to the death of the Wicked Witch of the West in The Wizard of Oz. Film critic Jay Botar of the Orlando Sentinel acknowledged it as the greatest meltdown since the Wicked Witch of the West.

== Reception ==
A screenshot of the revelation of Judge Doom's toon identity from the film's climax, which has been cited as having a traumatizing or scary effect on children when it premiered.

Christopher Lloyd's portrayal of Judge Doom has received overall positive reception with some authors comparing his role as a "brilliant" or "scary" villain. Wizard magazine rated Doom as the 60th Greatest Villain of All Time. Other lists include Digital Spy placing him as one of the most “batshit” film villains of all time, Fandango placing him number one on their list of "the most nefarious live-action Disney villains" and Livingly Media's Zimbio placing Doom as one of the scariest non-horror film villains. The character is usually ranked along with characters such as Large Marge from Pee-wee's Big Adventure and the Child Catcher from Chitty Chitty Bang Bang. Aly Semigran of Nerdist Industries ranked Doom as one of cinema's scariest old people.

The debut of his character where he murdered the shoe using the Dip was commonly cited as one of the scenes that made him terrifying. Along with the film's climactic plot twist of him being flattened by a steamroller and the reveal as a toon, alongside his true eyes and voice, was commonly ranked as the scariest of scenes for "kids films" as well. The reveal of his toon identity was placed as one of the most traumatizing reveals for kids from the 1980s by BuzzFeed. Rolling Stone placed it as one of the top twelve of scariest moments in a "kids" film. Neal Justin of the Star Tribune jokingly described Judge Doom as making Freddy Krueger "look like Fred Rogers" in reference with the squeaky voice reveal. YouTuber Nostalgia Critic placed the toon reveal scene as number three of his "Top 11 Scariest Nostalgic Moments".

== In popular culture ==
The Adventures of Rocky and Bullwinkle indirectly references Doom's biological weapon, the Dip. After Fearless Leader says there has never been a way to kill a toon before, The Mole says, "what about in the movie Roger Rabbit?". The Fearless Leader responds by saying that was different. Rappers MC Lars and Kool Keith wrote a song about Roger Rabbit and Judge Doom on Lars's 2015 album, The Zombie Dinosaur LP, called "The Dip". Lars cited Doom as a favorite villain of his. Christopher Lloyd guest starred on and gave insight into his character on an episode of the Disney+ original documentary series Prop Culture.

In May 2021, the quarterback of the National Football League's Tampa Bay Buccaneers, Tom Brady, was compared on Twitter as looking like Judge Doom (along with other fictional villains) in a fashion outfit of his when attending the 2021 Kentucky Derby. The noted comparison resulted in viral phenomenon jokes in regards to Brady being the character.

In August 2023, Judge Doom appeared as a character at the Oogie Boogie Bash Halloween Party at Disney California Adventure.

== See also ==
- List of Disney villain characters
- Noah Cross
