= The Witch of Hebron =

2010 novel by James Howard Kunstler

- Author: James Howard Kunstler
- Language: English
- Series: World Made by Hand series
- Genre: dystopian
- Publisher: Atlantic Monthly Press
- Publication date: 2010 (1st Hardcover Edition)
- Publication place: United States
- Media type: Print
- Pages: 336 pages (hardcover edition)
- ISBN: 0-8021-1961-1 (hardcover edition)
- Preceded by: World Made by Hand
- Followed by: A History of the Future

The Witch of Hebron is a dystopian novel by American writer James Howard Kunstler, published in 2010. It is a sequel to his 2008 novel World Made by Hand. Set in the fictional town of Union Grove, New York, the novel follows many of the same cast of characters from the previous novel as they navigate a world stripped of its modern comforts, ravaged by terrorism, epidemics, and the economic upheaval of peak oil.

Kunstler explores themes of local and sustainable living. In interviews, Kunstler describes his imaginary world as an "enlightened nineteenth century." The overarching premise, however, is a stark look into the future at the dire consequences of the poor American system of urban planning, and the complete lack of workability the contemporary suburban arrangement possesses without the continuous input of inexpensive and abundant energy to maintain its infrastructure. This has been the core theme of Kunstler's non-fiction works, including The Geography of Nowhere (1993) and The Long Emergency (2005).

== Synopsis ==
Following the characters from the first novel, the plot centers around Jasper Copeland, the eleven-year-old son of Union Grove's doctor. After his puppy is crushed by a stallion belonging to the New Faith Church, Copeland poisons the stallion with opium and runs away. His journey sets other characters in motion, mainly Brother Jobe, the leader of the New Faith Church and, to a lesser degree, Robert Earle, Rev. Loren Holder and Jasper's father, Dr. Copeland. It also introduces Perry Talisker, a local hermit, and Barbara Maglie, the witch of the title.

Set a few months after the events of A World Made by Hand, the citizens of Union Grove are living on the tail end of a national catastrophe, with their community slowly falling apart from neglect and natural decay. Much of the rest of the nation seems to be falling apart, with nuclear blasts in Los Angeles and Washington, D.C., cities devolving, and a fractured United States. Unlike the previous novel, the larger world does not much intrude as the entire story is set around the rural county.

== Characters ==
Jasper Copeland - The eleven-year-old protagonist and son of Union Grove's doctor. After his puppy is crushed by a stallion belonging to the New Faith Church, Copeland poisons the stallion with opium and runs away. He plans to go to nearby Glens Falls, a larger town to the north, and become a doctor like his father. Along the way, he meets Billy Bones, a bandit who insists the boy be his "protege". At first, Copeland stays with Bones to get to Glens Falls but soon realizes the man is homicidal. Repeated attempts to escape fail. When Billy Bones tries to rape the witch Barbara Maglie, Jasper saves her, killing Bones with a knife. Copeland is eventually caught by the New Faith Church, who were looking for him after he poisoned their stallion, but when he performs an emergency appendectomy on Brother Jobe they are square. Copeland returns to his home to be an apprentice to his father.

Billy Bones - A self-described bandit, he insists on singing a ballad about himself while robbing his victims. Quick to club people to death with the butt of his pistol or cut with the blade of his knife, he leaves a path of death. He adopts Jasper Copeland as his "protege" and then forces the boy to remain with him long after Copeland realizes Bones is psychotic and repeatedly tries to escape. In Glens Falls, Bones kills "Luke the Duke", the self-styled head of the town, and Angel, a transvestite Bones frequents. While attempting to rape Barbara Maglie, he is stabbed and killed by Jasper Copeland. In the book's epilogue, it is clear the "Ballad of Billy Bones" lives on in local legend.

Robert Earle - Earle worked in computers until things changed, and now works as a respected carpenter. A fiddle player in the town's various musical groups, he is the line between the past and the new age; of old democratic values and more dystopian forces struggling for control. His wife died in a flu epidemic and his son, Daniel, aged 19, left to see what happened to the rest of the world and has not been heard from since. In the previous novel, the arrival of the New Faith Church and murder by one of Karp's men make him realize their town's need to be more proactive in taking care of business as a community. He is elected mayor and attempts to restore law and order to the town. A widow and her daughter come to live with him after their house burns down, and Earle accepts that they are now his family. He continues this role in this novel.

Reverend Loren Holder - Pastor of the traditional white-steepled First Congregational church in Union Grove, his thoughts dwell in the past while he tries to keep up the town's spirits. He is Earle's best friend. In the previous book, his wife shared a bed weekly with Earle, an arrangement no one speaks with each other about but that ended when Earle took in the widow and child. Holder has been unable to get an erection for years, which leads to his wife's and Earle's arrangement. Suicidal and depressed, Holder visits Barbara Maglie, the witch of the title, having been told by Dr. Copeland that she might be able to help with her "magic". When Earle is made mayor, Holder is named the town's constable. After he visits with Maglie, in his role as constable, he rescues four boys who were being sold by a rural store owner. Upon returning home he takes the boys in and finds a future with his wife.

Barbara Maglie - She's the sole owner of a luxurious house in the village of Hebron, north of Union Grove, and is the story's eponymous witch. She is vexingly beautiful, has a vast knowledge of potions, and can predict the future. She explains her bounty by saying "people bring me things." When Earle and Dr. Copeland spend the night, they have fantastical, erotic dreams that seem to advertise her services. Later, Holder confesses he is impotent. Dr. Copeland then suggests a visit that proves successful. Billy Bones tries to rape her but Jasper Copeland stops him.

Brother Jobe - The leader of a religious group called the New Faith Church, which comes to Union Grove fleeing unrest in Virginia. His flock takes over the abandoned high school and has a "can-do" attitude, shaking the town that is slowly falling apart from neglect. Confident, the sect is mysterious and seems to embrace a punishing view of God. After Jasper Copeland poisons the New Faith Church's stallion, Brother Jobe and two of his men track him seeking justice, finding Bones' victims along the way. Copeland winds up saving Jobe's life by performing an emergency appendectomy.

Dr. Copeland - Jasper's father and the town doctor. When Jasper's dog is killed, he asks Brother Jobe if he can bring it back from the dead. Jobe says he cannot. A man of science, Copeland is unsure of what to put faith in and turns to alcohol. His dependency gets worse as he worries about his son. Unwilling at first to turn to the New Faith Church's men, who are expert trackers, he and Earle look as far as Barbara Maglie's house. After a night of provocative dreams, Earle and he come across a store they believe, correctly, is trading in young boys. He mentions both to Holder.

Perry Talisker - A hermit, outdoorsman, and former butcher whose wife ran away after a hard winter, he decides after looking at a poster that his fate lies in having a showdown with a catamount, a local mountain lion. After tracking them throughout the book, he kills one just as it pounces on Jasper Copeland. At the same instant he plunges his knife into it, the catamount kills him and they die together.

Stephen Bullock - A wealthy landowner from an old landowner family, he runs a two thousand acre spread along the Hudson River. In the past, his land was part of the town, but now it is its own village, set up much like a traditional English manor. He has a vision and has adjusted with the times, moving towards self-sufficiency.

== Reception ==
Reviews of the novel were largely positive. Publishers Weekly wrote, "In the sequel to his bestselling World Made by Hand, Kunstler delivers another grim and suspenseful novel." New York Journal of Books commented, "The Witch of Hebron is a fast-moving and enjoyable read for the warm days and chilly nights of autumn, when you are staying in a rural B&B reading by candlelight, or watching the leaves change on a red and yellow river bluff, drinking a thermos of hot apple cider." Ed Park of the Los Angeles Times found the manner in which the book picks up from World Made by Hand and its switch from that book's first person perspective to third person omniscient to be questionable, but said that the book is saved by the characters' evocative nostalgia for civilization's past (the reader's present), Kuntsler's strong storytelling chops, and the compelling dynamic between Billy Bones and Jasper.

== See also ==
- World Made by Hand
- A History of the Future
