= Potemkin village =

Façade making something seem better than in reality

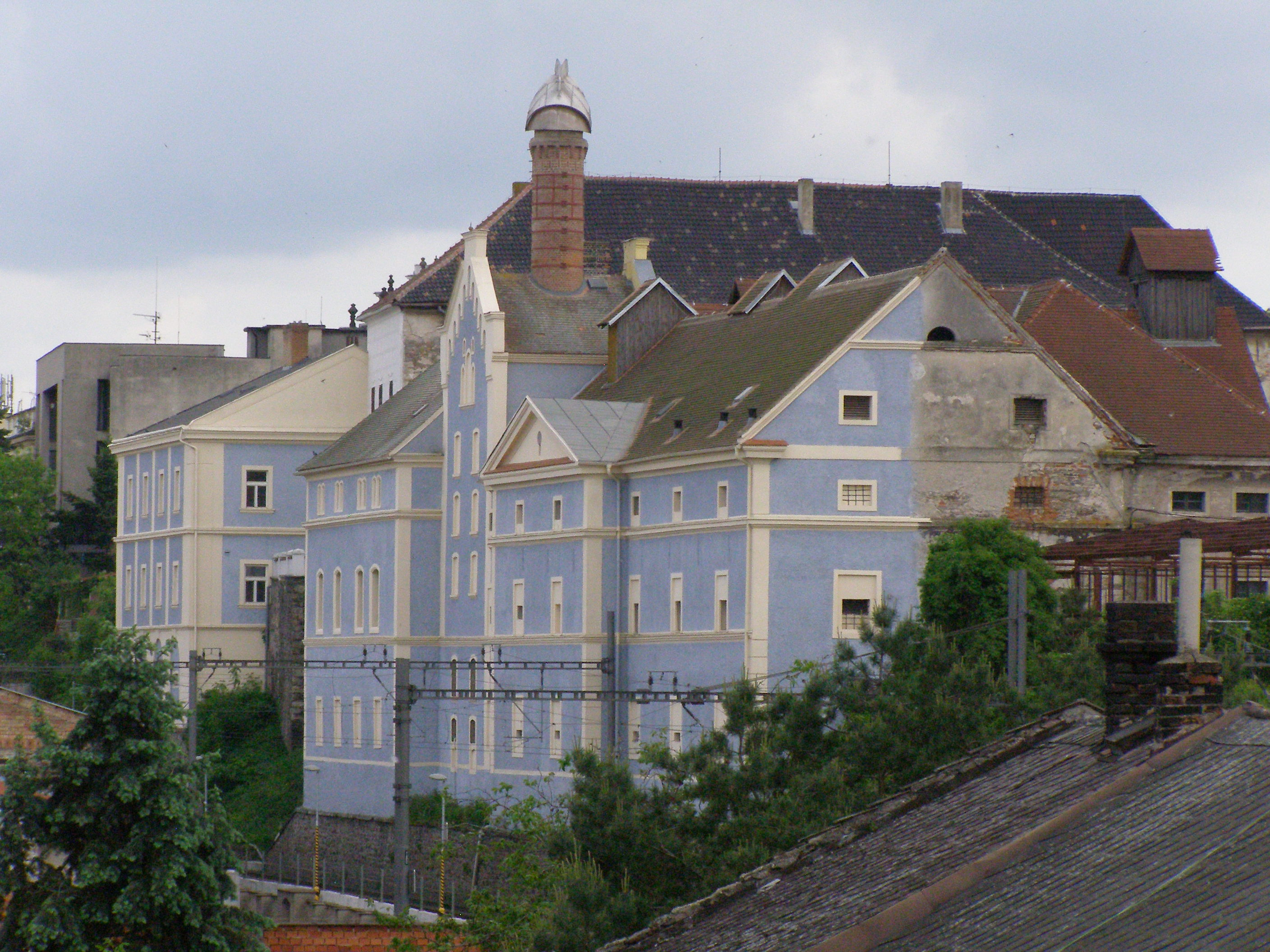
Because of a newly painted façade, the whole building looks as if it has been reconstructed, although the rest is still in decay (castle brewery in Kolín, Czech Republic).

A Potemkin village (Note: Russian: потёмкинские деревни, romanized: potyomkinskiye derevni.) (Russian: [pɐˈtʲɵmkʲɪn]) is a construction, literal or figurative, that provides a façade to a situation, to make people believe that the situation is better than it actually is.

The term comes from stories of a fake portable village built by Grigory Potemkin, a field marshal and former lover of Catherine the Great, to impress the Empress during her visit to Crimea in 1787. Modern historians agree that accounts of this portable village are exaggerated. The original story was that Potemkin erected phony portable settlements along the banks of the Dnieper River in order to impress the Russian Empress and foreign guests. The structures would be disassembled after she passed, and re-assembled farther along her route to be seen again.

== Origin ==
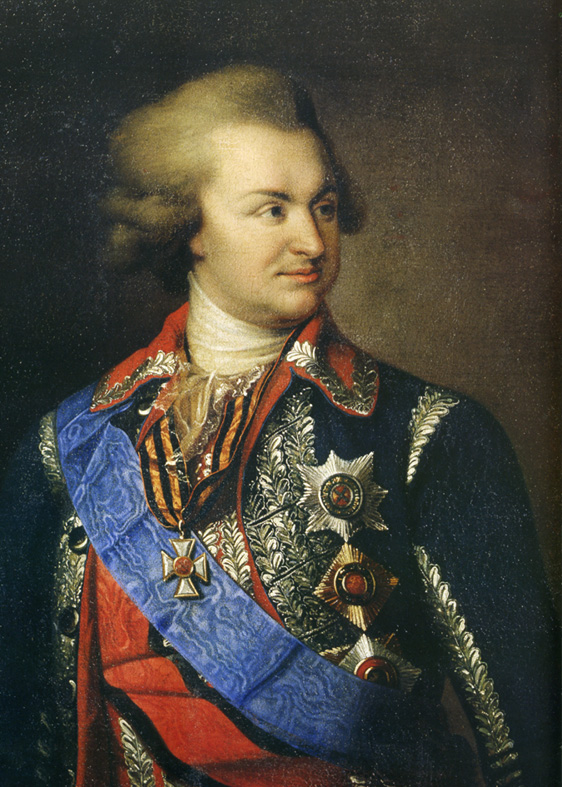
Grigory Potemkin, namesake of the concept

Grigory Potemkin was a minister and lover of the Russian Empress Catherine II. After the 1783 Russian annexation of Crimea from the Ottoman Empire and "liquidation" of the Cossack Zaporozhian Sich (see New Russia), Potemkin became governor of the region. Crimea had been devastated by the war, and the Muslim Tatar inhabitants of Crimea were viewed as a potential fifth column of the Ottoman Empire. Potemkin's major tasks were to pacify and rebuild by bringing in Russian settlers. In 1787, as a new war was about to break out between Russia and the Ottoman Empire, Catherine II, with her court and several ambassadors, made an unprecedented six-month trip to New Russia. One purpose of this trip was to impress Russia's allies prior to the war. To help accomplish this, Potemkin was said to have set up "mobile villages" on the banks of the Dnieper River. As soon as the barge carrying the Empress and ambassadors arrived, Potemkin's men, dressed as peasants, would populate the village. Once the barge left, the village was disassembled, then rebuilt downstream overnight.

The term was coined by Georg Adolf Wilhelm von Helbig (1757–1813), a Saxon diplomat who served at the Russian imperial court in Saint Petersburg from 1787. Helbig first introduced the account in his anonymously published serialised biography of Potemkin, Potemkin. Der Taurier, in the Hamburg journal Minerva (1797–1799), and expanded it in his 1809 work Russische Günstlinge (Russian Favorites). Helbig was not present during Catherine's 1787 Crimean journey and compiled his account from rumors prevalent at the Saint Petersburg court.

=== Historical accuracy ===
Although "Potemkin village" has come to mean, especially in a political context, any hollow or false construct, a façade, physical or figurative, meant to hide an undesirable or potentially damaging situation, it is possible that the phrase cannot be applied accurately to its own original historical inspiration, and that the claims of deception were part of a defamation campaign against Potemkin.

According to Simon Sebag-Montefiore, Potemkin's most comprehensive English-language biographer, the tale of elaborate, fake settlements, with glowing fires designed to comfort the monarch and her entourage as they surveyed the barren territory at night, is largely fictional. Aleksandr Panchenko, an established specialist on 19th-century Russia, used original correspondence and memoirs to conclude that the Potemkin villages are a myth. He writes: "Based on the above said we must conclude that the myth of 'Potemkin villages' is exactly a myth, and not an established fact." He writes that "Potyomkin indeed decorated existing cities and villages, but made no secret that this was a decoration".

The close relationship between Potemkin and the empress could have made it difficult for him to deceive her. Thus, if there were deception, it would have been mainly directed towards the foreign ambassadors accompanying the imperial party.

== Modern usage ==
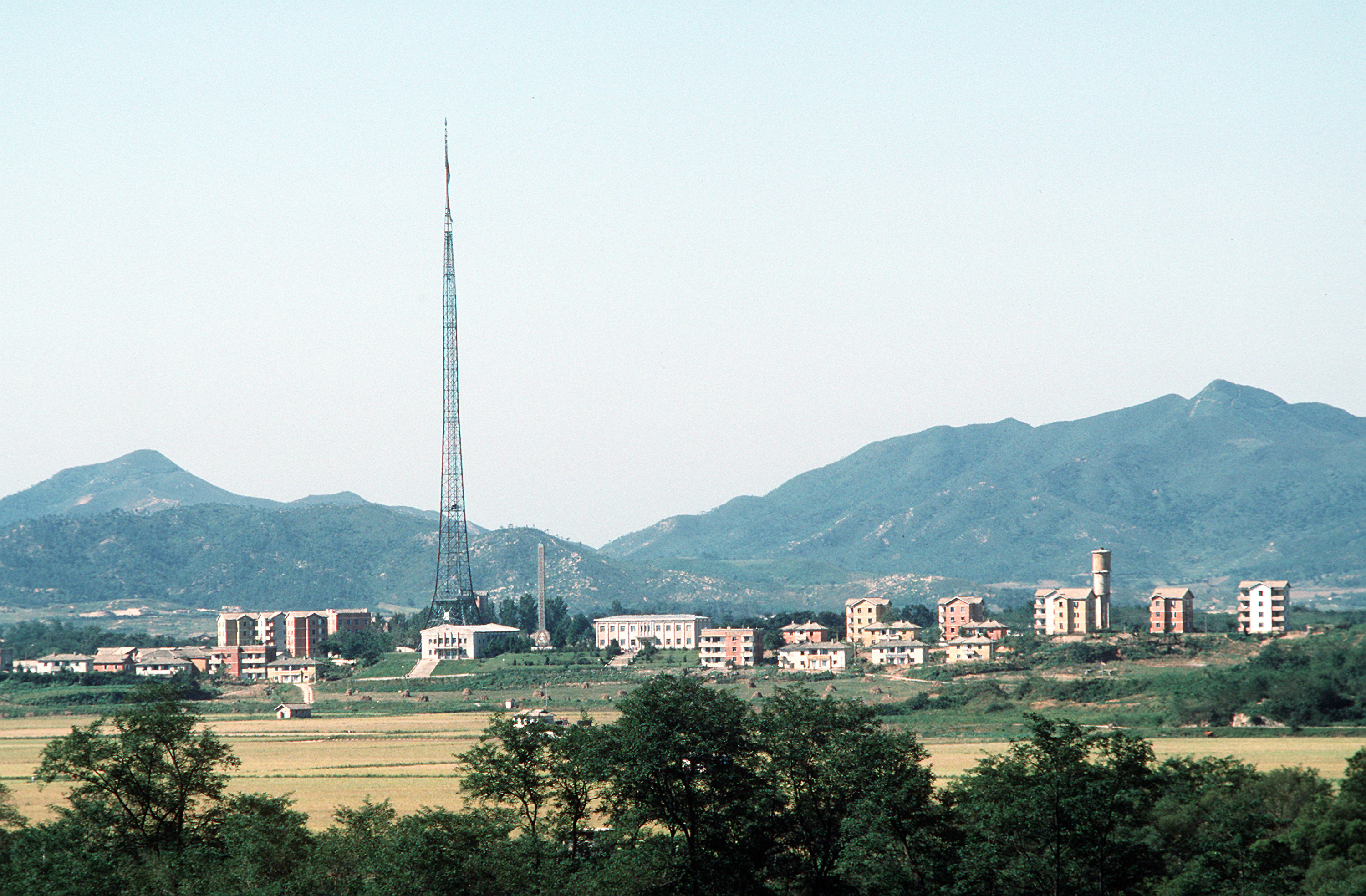
The North Korean Peace Village, located inside the Demilitarized Zone, appears empty despite its advertised population of two hundred families.

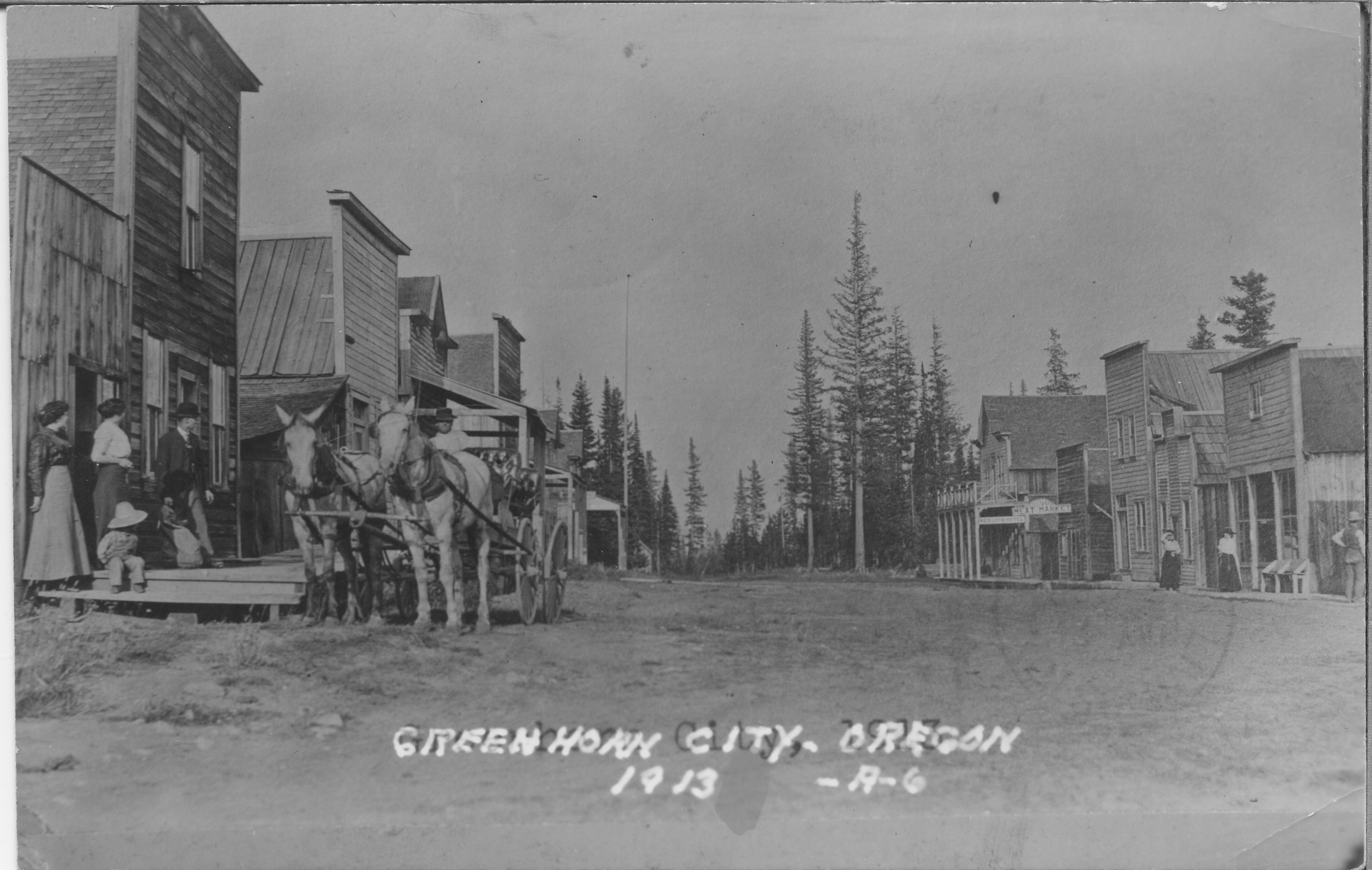
False front commercial buildings in Greenhorn, Oregon, 1913

In the Old West of the United States, Western false front architecture was often used to create the illusion of affluence and stability in a new frontier town. The style included a tall vertical façade with a square top in front of a wood-framed building, often hiding a gable roof. The goal for the architecture was to project an image of stability and success for the town, while the business owners did not invest much in buildings that might be temporary. These towns often did not last long before becoming ghost towns, so businessmen wanted to get started quickly but did not want to spend a lot on their stores. Many Western movies feature this kind of architecture because, just like the original buildings, it is quick and cheap to create.

Many of the newly constructed base areas at ski resorts in the US are referred to as Potemkin villages. These create the illusion of a quaint mountain town, but are actually carefully planned theme shopping centers, hotels and restaurants designed for maximum revenue. Similarly, in The Geography of Nowhere, American writer James Howard Kunstler refers to contemporary suburban shopping centers as "Potemkin village shopping plazas".

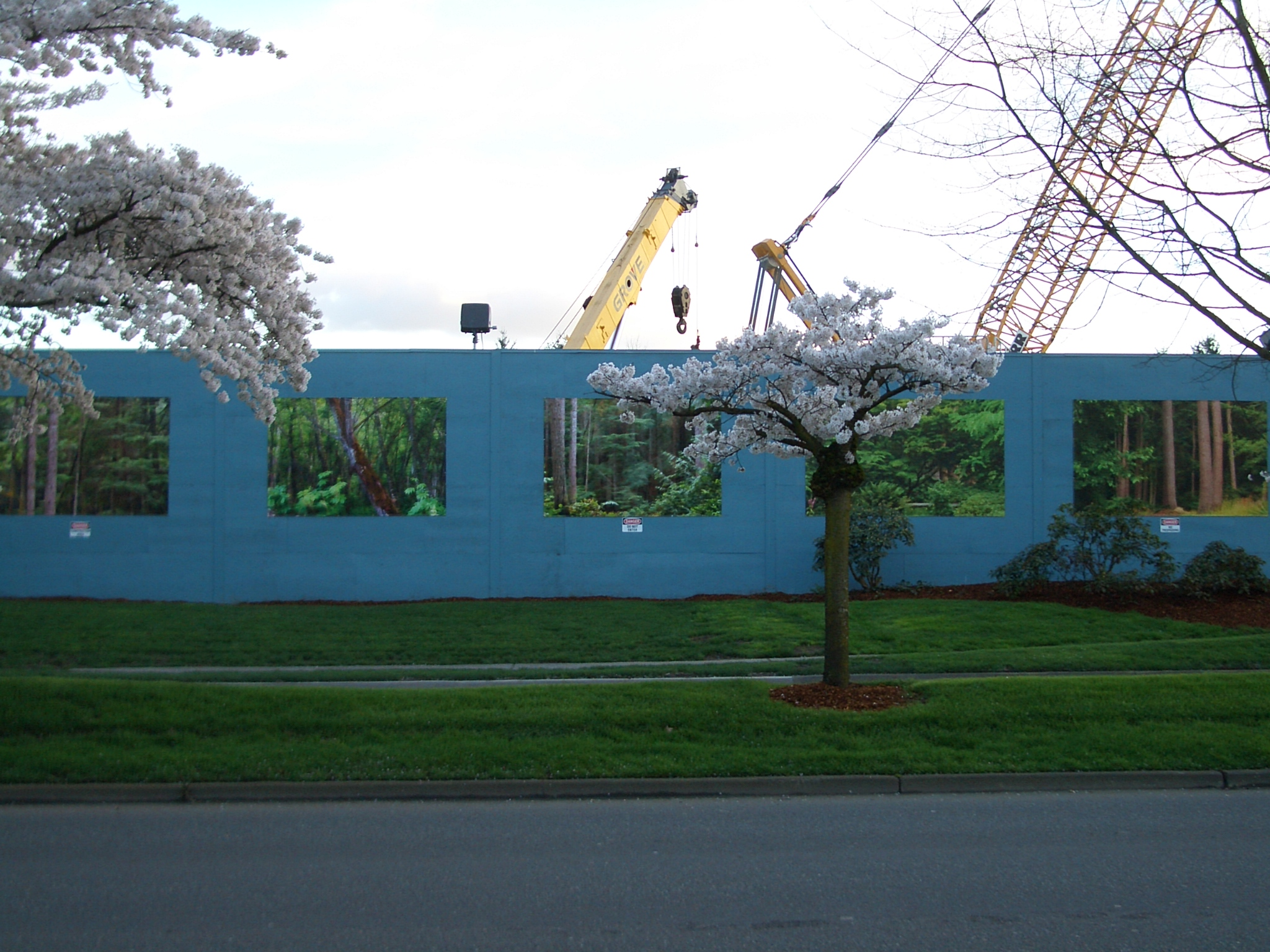
Motorists and pedestrians in Bothell, Washington, can see a forest-like view at this construction site.

Sometimes, instead of the full phrase, just "Potemkin" is used, as an adjective. For example, the use of a row of trees to screen a clearcut area from motorists has been called a "Potemkin forest". The glossary entry for "clearcut" in We Have The Right To Exist: A Translation of Aboriginal Indigenous Thought states that "Much of the extensive clearcut in northern Minnesota is insulated from scrutiny by the urbanized public by a Potemkin forest, or, as the D.N.R. terms it, an aesthetic strip – a thin illusion of forest about six trees deep, along most highways and fronting waters frequented by tourists." Another example is the phrase "Potemkin court", which implies that the court's reason to exist is being called into question (differing from the phrase "kangaroo court" with which the court's standard of justice is being impugned).

"Potemkin village" is a phrase that has been used by American judges, especially members of a multiple-judge panel who dissent from the majority's opinion on a particular matter, to refer to an inaccurate or tortured interpretation and/or application of a particular legal doctrine to the specific facts at issue. Use of the phrase is meant to imply that the reasons espoused by the panel's majority in support of its decision are not based on accurate or sound law, and their restrictive application is merely a masquerade for the court's desire to avoid a difficult decision. For example, in Planned Parenthood of Southeastern Pennsylvania v. Casey (1992), chief justice of the United States William Rehnquist wrote that Roe v. Wade "stands as a sort of judicial Potemkin Village, which may be pointed out to passers-by as a monument to the importance of adhering to precedent". Similarly, Judge William G. Young of the District of Massachusetts described the use of affidavits in U.S. litigation as "the Potemkin Village of today's litigation landscape" because "adjudication by affidavit is like walking down a street between two movie sets, all lawyer-painted façade and no interior architecture."

== See also ==
- Theresienstadt (1944 film)
- Theresienstadt Ghetto and the Red Cross
- Czech Dream
- Disneyfication
- Potemkin Island
- Potemkin City Limits, an album by punk band Propagandhi
- The Truman Show
- Legends of Catherine the Great
- Novorossiya ("New Russia"), historical region in the Russian Empire
- Folly, architecture vernacular
- Fake building
- Façadism
- Sportswashing
- Kijong-dong
- Portmeirion, a folly tourist village, used as the filming location for the 1967 TV series The Prisoner
- Leinster Gardens

== Bibliography ==
- EircomTribunal, "2003 Potemkin Village Award", EircomTribunal.com, "ET – 2003 Potemkin Village Award". Eircomtribunal.com. Archived from the original on 10 July 2011.
- * Goldberg, Jonah. "Potemkin Village in Cuba: Let's make one of our own". National Review. 18 April 2000. National Review, 19 April 2000.
- Ivan Katchanovski and La Porte, Todd. "Cyberdemocracy or Potemkin E-Villages? Electronic Governments in OECD and Post-Communist Countries", International Journal of Public Administration, Volume 28, Number 7–8, July 2005.
- Ledeen, Michael. "Potemkin WMDs? Really?", National Review, 2 February 2004 "Michael Ledeen on WMDs & Iraq on National Review Online". National Review. 2 February 2004.
- Smith, Douglas (ed. and trans). Love and Conquest: Personal Correspondence of Catherine the Great and Prince Grigory Potemkin ISBN 0-87580-324-5
- Potemkin Court as a description of The Foreign Intelligence Surveillance Court (from the Washington Post)
- "Potemkin Parliament". New Statesman. 133 (4706). 20 September 2004.
- Sullivan, Kevin. "Borderline Absurdity", Washington Post, 11 January 1998.
- Buchan, James. "Potemkin democracy" as a description of Russia. "New Statesman", 17 July 2006.
- Helbig, Georg Adolf Wilhelm von. Russische Günstlinge (Russian Favorites). J.G. Cotta, Tübingen, 1809. Revised edition ed. Max Bauer, Georg Müller Verlag, Munich and Berlin, 1917.
