= World Made by Hand =

Book by James Howard Kunstler

- Author: James Howard Kunstler
- Language: English
- Series: World Made by Hand
- Genre: dystopian social sci-fi
- Publisher: Atlantic Monthly Press
- Publication date: 2008 (1st edition)
- Publication place: United States
- Media type: Print
- Pages: 317 pages (hardcover edition)
- ISBN: 978-0-87113-978-8 (hardcover edition)
- Followed by: The Witch of Hebron

World Made by Hand is a dystopian and social science fiction novel by American author James Howard Kunstler, published in 2008. Set in the fictional town of Union Grove, New York, the novel follows a cast of characters as they navigate a world stripped of its modern comforts, ravaged by terrorism, epidemics, and the economic upheaval of peak oil, all of which are exacerbated by global warming.

World Made by Hand is followed by three sequels in the series, The Witch of Hebron (2010), A History of the Future (2014) and The Harrows Of Spring (2016).

== Synopsis ==
Narrated by Robert Earle, a local carpenter who has lost his wife and son, the novel focuses on four separate "cultures" that represent the directions society could go after a breakdown of modern social norms. The citizens of Union Grove are living on the tail end of a national catastrophe, with their community slowly falling apart from neglect and natural decay. Within their community, a separate group of scrappers and thugs led by Wayne Karp run the "General Store" out of the town dump and live in a group of trailers known as Karptown. The third faction is led by Stephen Bullock, a wealthy farmer with a vision who has set his farm up like an English manor and strives to become self-sufficient. As the story begins Brother Jobe comes to town, the leader of the New Faith Church, a religious group that has fled the south and settle into the old high school. Much of the rest of the nation seems to be falling apart, with nuclear blasts destroying such major cities as Los Angeles and Washington, D.C., cities devolving, and a fractured United States. These forces struggle to respect life in a way that was taken for granted before events changed, and build pragmatically for a new future. Earle's experiences are the focus of this struggle.

Kunstler explores themes of local and sustainable living. Kunstler describes his imaginary world as an "enlightened nineteenth century" in interviews. The overarching premise, however, is a stark look into the future at the dire consequences of the poor American urban planning system, and the complete lack of workability the contemporary suburban arrangement possesses without the continuous input of easy-to-find and abundant energy to maintain its infrastructure. This has been the core theme of Kunstler's nonfiction works, including the Geography of Nowhere (1993) and The Long Emergency.

== Characters ==
Robert Earle/Ehrlich – The narrator and protagonist, Earle worked in computers until things changed, and now works as a respected carpenter. A fiddle player in the town's various musical groups, he is the line between the past and the new age; of old democratic values and more dystopian forces struggling for control. His wife died in a flu epidemic and his son, Daniel, aged 19, left to see what happened to the rest of the world and has not been heard from since. The arrival of the New Faith Church and a murder by one of Karp's men makes him realize their town's need to be more proactive in taking care of business as a community. He is elected mayor and attempts to restore law and order to the town. A widow and her daughter come to live with him after their house burns down, and Earle accepts that they are now his family.

Reverend Loren Holder – Pastor of the traditional white steepled First Congregational church in Union Grove, his thoughts dwell in the past while he tries to keep up the town's spirits. He is Earle's best friend. In the first half of the book, his wife shares a bed weekly with Earle, an arrangement no one speaks with each other about. When Earle is made mayor, Holder is named the town's constable. He is tortured and critically wounded by Karp's men when Earle and Holder serve a warrant for Karp's arrest.

Wayne Karp – Operator of the former landfill, or "General Supply", referred to by most as "the general". A former trucker and blue collar worker, Karp is now the leader of a group of a hundred "like-minded former motorheads, greasers, bikers, quasi-criminals and their families who had drifted in over the years". The General Supply has been a cooperative until Karp took it over. The group has tattooed wings above their eyebrows, and they salvage abandoned buildings and are excavating the town dump for salvage, which he sells at the General Supply. When Holder and Earle fail in their attempt to serve a warrant for his arrest, members of the New Faith Church bring him in. He dies in his jail cell under mysterious circumstances.

Brother Jobe – The leader of a religious group called the New Faith Church, which comes to Union Grove fleeing unrest in Virginia. His flock takes over the abandoned high school and has a "can do" attitude, shaking the town that is slowly falling apart from neglect. Confident, the sect is mysterious and seems to embrace a more punishing view of God than Holder.

Stephen Bullock – A wealthy landowner from an old landowner family, he runs a two thousand acre spread along the Hudson River. Old world, his land was part of the town, but now it is, in effect, its own village set up much like a traditional English manor. He has vision and has adjusted with the times, moving towards self-sufficiency.

== Reception ==
Reviews of the novel were largely positive. The San Francisco Chronicle's review described the book as an "impassioned and invigorating tale", while the Chicago Tribune concluded that it was "brilliant cautionary fiction".

== See also ==
- The Witch of Hebron
- A History of the Future
