= North Korea Peace Museum =

Museum in North Korea

Coordinates: 37.96107°N 126.66447°E

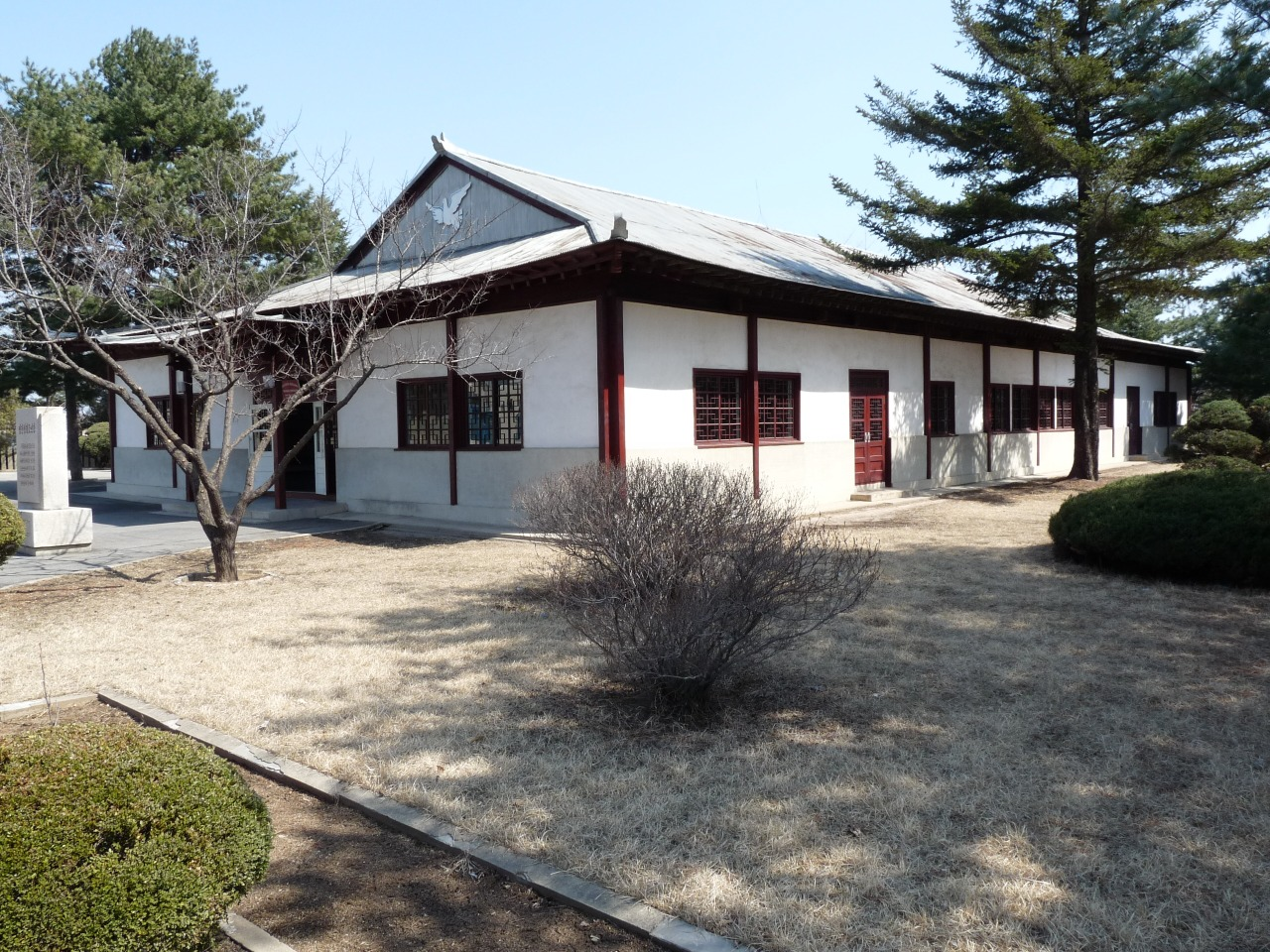
- North Korea Peace Museum in 2012

Korean name
- Hangul: 조선민주주의인민공화국 평화박물관
- Hanja: 朝鮮民主主義人民共和國平和博物館
- RR: Joseon minjujuui inmin gonghwaguk pyeonghwa bangmulgwan
- MR: Chosŏn minjujuŭi inmin konghwaguk p'yŏnghwa pangmulgwan

The North Korea Peace Museum is in the building constructed to house the signing of the Korean War Armistice Agreement on 27 July 1953. It is located in the former village of Panmunjeom (Phanmunjŏm) in Panmun-guyok, Kaesong, North Korea.

It is located approximately 1.2 kilometres (3/4 mi) northwest of the Joint Security Area (JSA), in the northern half of the Demilitarized Zone. The building is all that remains of the former village, and since the mid-1950s, references to Panmunjom actually refer to the Joint Security Area itself. It is about 1.9 kilometres (1 3/16 mi) northeast of Kijong-dong, often referred to as Propaganda Village.

The weapons used to kill U.S. Army Captain Arthur Bonifas and Lieutenant Mark Barrett in the axe murder incident of 1976 are housed within the museum.

There is a symbol of a dove above the door. At the time of the signing of the armistice, a copy of Pablo Picasso's Dove was hanging inside the building. Because Picasso was a communist, the Americans considered it a symbol of communism, and it was covered up.

== See also ==
- List of museums in North Korea
