= Invasion of Armed Forces in Gangneung =

On September 18, 1996, 26 special troops and crew members from the North Korean Ministry of People's Armed Forces' Reconnaissance Bureau infiltrated the area after a North Korean shark-class submarine ran aground on the coast of Aninjin-myeon, Gangneung-si, Gangwon-do.

== Background ==
North Korea's submarine infiltration campaign has been in full swing since 1994. Since 1994, North Korea has deployed submarines for espionage, and infiltrated spies in Seogwipo in September 1995.The purpose of the armed men's infiltration into Gangneung in September 1996 was to assassinate President Kim Young-sam around the opening of the National Sports Festival to be held in Chuncheon, Gangwon-do on October 7, 1996. At that time, North Korea held an armed protest at Panmunjom after declaring in a statement by the North Korean People's Army that it would not comply with regulations related to the Demilitarized Zone due to dissatisfaction with the South Korea-U.S.joint military drills in the Sea of Japan. It is also presumed that he tried to overcome the crisis through military action because he had a sense of crisis about social chaos caused by food shortages in North Korea, the possibility of regime collapse, and discussions on absorptive reunification in South Korea.

== Progress and results ==
On September 18, 1996, a taxi driver who was driving on a coastal road near Aninjin-ri, Gangdong-myeon, Gangneung-si, Gangwon-do, found the winners of the move and the ship stranded on the coast and reported it to the police. As the stranded ship was identified as a small North Korean submarine, soldiers, police, and reservists began a 49-day sweep, capturing one armed spy alive, killing 13 people, and capturing 4,380 pieces of oil, including anti-tank rockets. In addition, the bodies of 11 crew members were found who were believed to have been killed by their own operation team in accordance with North Korea's orders. On the Korean side, 11 soldiers, two police and reservists, and four civilians were killed. According to the interrogation of the captors, the infiltration secretaries were made up of a total of 26 military officers, including operatives, guides, and crew members, belonging to the 22nd squadron of the North Korean Ministry of People's Armed Forces' Reconnaissance Bureau. The 300-ton shark-class submarine they used for the infiltration was 35 meters long and 3.8 meters wide and was adapted for special operations. Based on the captors' statements and portable equipment, the purpose of their infiltration was to collect data on major facilities such as airfields and power plants and to test our military's alert posture.
