= Amsil =

Amsil 암실/岩室

Korean transcription(s)
  - Chosŏn'gŭl: 암실
  - McCune-Reischauer: Amsil
  - Revised Romanization: Amsil
- Map of North Korea showing the location of Amsil
- Coordinates: 37°47′N 126°35′E
- Country: North Korea
- Special city: Kaesŏng
- County: P'anmun-guyŏk

Amsil is a village in P'anmun-guyŏk, Kaesŏng, North Korea near the South Korean border. It is visible from the Odusan Unification Observatory in the southern border.
