= James Howard Kunstler =

American writer, social critic, blogger

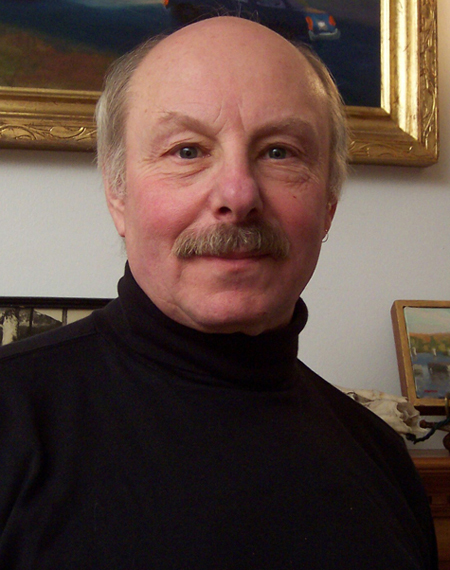
- Kunstler in December 2007
- Born: New York City, U.S.
- Occupations: Writer, social critic, blogger
- Spouse: Jennifer Armstrong (1996-2002)
- Website: Kunstler.com

James Howard Kunstler (born 1948) is an American writer, social critic, public speaker, and blogger. He is best known for his books The Geography of Nowhere (1994), a history of American suburbia and urban development, The Long Emergency (2005), and Too Much Magic (2012). In The Long Emergency, he imagines peak oil and oil depletion resulting in the end of industrialized society, forcing Americans to live in smaller-scale, localized, agrarian or semi-agrarian communities. He uses speculative fiction to portray this type of future in World Made by Hand.

== Background ==
Kunstler was born in New York City to Jewish parents, who divorced when he was eight. His family then moved to the suburbs on Long Island. His biological father was a middleman in the diamond trade. Kunstler spent most of his childhood with his mother and stepfather, a publicist for Broadway shows. While spending summers at a boys' camp in New Hampshire, he became acquainted with a small town ethos that would later permeate many of his works.

He lives in Greenwich, a town in Washington County, New York.

== Education ==
In 1966, Kunstler graduated from New York City's High School of Music & Art and attended the State University of New York at Brockport, where he majored in theater.

== Career ==
After college, Kunstler worked as a reporter and feature writer for a number of newspapers, and finally as a staff writer for Rolling Stone. During the 1970s and 1980s, Kunstler worked "a lot of odd jobs, from orderly in the psychiatric wing of the hospital to digging holes for percolation tests in housing subdivisions".

In 1975, he began writing books and lecturing full-time. Kunstler's blog states that he has lectured at Harvard, Yale, Columbia, Dartmouth, Cornell, MIT, RPI, and the University of Virginia and has appeared before professional organizations such as the AIA, the APA, and the National Trust for Historic Preservation.

Kunstler lectured on topics related to suburbia, urban development, and the challenges of what he calls "the global oil predicament", and a resultant change in the "American Way of Life." He lectured at the TED Conference, the American Institute of Architects, the National Trust for Historic Preservation, the International Council of Shopping Centers, and the National Association of Science and Technology, as well as at numerous colleges and universities, including Yale, MIT, Harvard, Cornell, the University of Illinois, DePaul, Texas A&M, the USMA, and Rutgers University.

As a journalist, Kunstler wrote articles for The Atlantic, Slate, Rolling Stone, The New York Times Magazine, and its op-ed page where he covered environmental and economic issues. Kunstler is also a supporter of the movement known as New Urbanism.

His career peaked with the popularising of the concept of peak oil, for which he was a prominent spokesman, such as in the 2004 documentary The End of Suburbia. His 2005 book The Long Emergency became an oft-cited reference for the predicted imminent collapse of human civilisation. However, oil supplies increased due to fracking, and the collapse did not happen during the timeframe Kunstler predicted.

== Political views ==
Kunstler was previously a harsh critic of the Republican Party, describing them as "a gang of hypocritical, pietistic sadists, seeking pleasure in the suffering of others while pretending to be Christians, devoid of sympathy, empathy, or any inclination to simple human kindness, constant breakers of the Golden Rule, enemies of the common good." However, following the election of Donald Trump, he began to criticize the Democratic Party and their "underhanded attempts" to get rid of Trump, a man whom Kunstler sees as showing "strength". He was a promoter of the concept of a so-called "deep state" working to overthrow and thwart Trump. He endorsed Trump for re-election and declared that he intended to do "everything he can to prevent the Democrats from winning the election."

In an interview with American Conservative, Kunstler attacked gay marriage, describing it as "cultural mischief" that would further damage "a struggling institution". He believes that the 2020 United States presidential election was fraudulent, describing it as a "fraud-inflected election" on his website, and he suggests that the 2021 storming of the United States Capitol was the work of left-wing groups.

In recent times, Kunstler has had financial problems and was described as "seethingly angry" about his writing income falling to only a few thousand dollars annually because of "the tidal wave of free content on the web". In addition, his "lucrative college speaking fees" have disappeared, which he blames on "the rising hysteria on campus against threatening ideas". Kunstler now uses Patreon to crowdfund his writing.

In an interview with Doug Casey published on October 13, 2021, Kunstler called the COVID-19 pandemic a "scam", and on October 11 he published the debunked vaccine conspiracy theory that the vaccine would kill people "steadily over the weeks and months" and went on to name hydroxychloroquine and ivermectin as "effective" treatments.

It’s getting harder to conceal the deaths and injuries caused by the vaccines, including a striking drop in fertility and the permanent damage to millions of people’s immune systems that will lay them low with cancer, neurological illness, and cardiovascular disease in the months ahead. — Jim Kunstler, How Low can You Go?,

== Writing ==
Over the course of the first 14 years of his writing career (1979–1993), Kunstler wrote seven novels.

Since the mid-1990s, he has written four non-fiction books about suburban development and diminishing global oil supplies. According to the Columbia Journalism Review, his first work on the subject, The Geography of Nowhere, discussed the effects of "cartoon architecture, junked cities, and a ravaged countryside". The book was described as a jeremiad by The Washington Post. Kunstler is critical of suburbia and urban development trends throughout the United States and is a proponent of the New Urbanism movement. According to Scott Carlson, reporter for The Chronicle of Higher Education, Kunstler's books on the subject have become "standard reading in architecture and urban planning courses".

He describes America as a poorly planned and "tragic landscape of highway strips, parking lots, housing tracts, mega-malls, junked cities, and ravaged countryside that makes up the everyday environment where most Americans live and work." In a 2001 op-ed for Planetizen, he wrote that in the wake of 9/11, the "age of skyscrapers is at an end", that no new megatowers would be built, and that existing tall buildings are destined to be dismantled.

In his books that followed, such as Home From Nowhere, The City in Mind, and The Long Emergency (2005), he discussed topics in the context of a coming post-oil America. Kunstler says he wrote The Geography of Nowhere, "Because I believe a lot of people share my feelings about the tragic landscape of highway strips, parking lots, housing tracts, mega-malls, junked cities, and ravaged countryside that makes up the everyday environment where most Americans live and work".

He envisions a future where localized agriculture and production predominate, with little reliance on imports, in his 2008 social science fiction novel World Made by Hand. Three sequels have followed: The Witch of Hebron (2010), A History of the Future (2015), and The Harrows of Spring (2016).

Kunstler has written articles for the American Conservative magazine.

In his writings and lectures, he contends that there is no other alternative energy source on the horizon that can replace petroleum. He therefore envisions a "low energy" world that will be radically different from today's. This has contributed to his becoming an outspoken advocate for one of his solutions, a more energy-efficient rail system, and he writes, "we have to get cracking on the revival of the railroad system if we expect to remain a united country."

== Reception ==
A 2020 article at New Geography described one of Kunstler's essays in American Conservative as a "misanthropic, pessimistically aggressive Malthusian screed", and commented that Kunstler's over-the-top act shows him to be "survivalist masquerading as an urban geographer". The article points to Kunstler's growing appeal to conservatives due to the "overlap between libertarian conservatives and environmentalist zealots".

In 2005, conservative writer Bill Kauffman called Kunstler the "scourge of suburbia," and a "slashingly witty Jeremiah." In a 2008 review of Kunstler's weekly audio podcast, the Columbia Journalism Review described the KunstlerCast as offering "some of the smartest, most honest urban commentary around—online or off." The Albany Times Union reviewed Kunstler's book World Made by Hand, writing that "James Howard Kunstler is fiddling his way to the apocalypse, one jig at a time." The paper described the book's scenario as "grim", with "an upside or two."

Critiquing The Long Emergency, journalist Chris Hayes claimed in 2010 that while Kunstler makes valid points about the consequences of peak oil, he undermines his credibility with rhetoric and perceived misanthropy. Joseph Romm, a climate change expert and Senior Fellow at the Center for American Progress, stated that accelerating shifts toward renewable energy will maintain suburban lifestyles and that, contrary to Kunstler's arguments, "suburbia won't be destroyed by peak oil."

Charles Bensinger, co-founder of Renewable Energy Partners of New Mexico, describes Kunstler's views as "fashionably fear-mongering" and uninformed regarding the potential of renewable energy resources to eliminate the need for fossil fuels. In 2005, David Ehrenfeld, writing for American Scientist, saw Kunstler delivering a "powerful integration of science, technology, economics, finance, international politics and social change" with a "lengthy discussion of the alternatives to cheap oil."

== Publications ==
=== Novels ===
- The Wampanaki Tales (1979)
- A Clown in the Moonlight (1981)
- The Life of Byron Jaynes (1983)
- An Embarrassment of Riches (1985)
- Blood Solstice (1986)
- The Halloween Ball (1987)
- Bagging Bigfoot/The Hunt (1988)
- Thunder Island (1989)
- Maggie Darling: A Modern Romance (2003)
- World Made by Hand (2008)
- The Witch of Hebron (2010)
- Manhattan Gothic (2012)
- A History of the Future (2014)
- The Harrows of Spring (2016)
- A Safe and Happy Place (2017)
- The Law of the Jungle: A Tale of Loss and Woe (2018)
- The Fall of the Ancients: A Tale of Fortitude and Triumph (2018)
- A Christmas Orphan: a Tale of Pluck and Salvation (2019)

=== Nonfiction ===
- The Geography of Nowhere (1993)
- Home from Nowhere (1996)
- The City in Mind: Notes on the Urban Condition (2001)
- The Long Emergency (2005)
- Too Much Magic (2012)
- Living in the Long Emergency (2020)

=== Plays ===
- Big Slide (2010)

== See also ==
- Georgism – Economic philosophy centered on common ownership of land
- John Michael Greer – American writer and druid (born 1962)
- Dmitry Orlov – American engineer and writer
- Psychology of previous investment
- Michael Ruppert – American writer and investigative journalist (1951-2014)
