= A History of the Future (novel) =

- First edition
- Author: James Howard Kunstler
- Language: English
- Genre: Dystopian novel
- Publisher: Atlantic Monthly Press
- Publication date: 2014
- Publication place: United States
- ISBN: 978-0-8021-2252-0
- Preceded by: The Witch of Hebron

A History of the Future is the third installment in American author and social critic James Howard Kunstler's A World Made by Hand series. As Christmas Day approaches, a double murder challenges an improvised justice system, and a young man returns after a two-year journey with his own story to tell.

It is the third book in a novel series that includes The Witch of Hebron (2010) and The Harrows of Spring (2016).
