= Dmitry Orlov (writer) =

American engineer and writer

Dmitry Orlov (Russian: Дми́трий Орло́в; born 1962) is an American engineer and writer on subjects related to "potential economic, ecological and political decline and collapse in the United States", something he has called "permanent crisis". Orlov believes collapse will be the result of huge military budgets, government deficits, an unresponsive political system and declining oil production.

== Biography ==
Orlov was born in Novokuznetsk, Russia and moved to the United States at the age of 12. He has a BS in Computer Engineering and an MA in Applied Linguistics. He was an eyewitness to the collapse of the Soviet Union over several extended visits to his Russian homeland between the late 1980s and mid-1990s.

In 2005 and 2006 Orlov wrote a number of articles comparing the collapse-preparedness of the U.S. and the Soviet Union published on small Peak Oil related sites. Orlov's article "Closing the 'Collapse Gap': the USSR was better prepared for collapse than the US" was very popular at EnergyBulletin.Net.

In 2006 Orlov published an online manifesto, "The New Age of Sail." In 2007 he and his wife sold their apartment in Boston and bought a sailboat, fitted with solar panels and six months supply of propane, and capable of storing a large quantity of food stuffs. He calls it a "survival capsule". He uses a bicycle for transportation. Having bartered vodka for necessities during one of his trips to the post-collapse Russia, he says "When faced with a collapsing economy, one should stop thinking of wealth in terms of money."

He continues to write regularly on his "Club Orlov" blog and at EnergyBulletin.Net.

== Works ==
=== Reinventing Collapse (2008) ===
Orlov's book Reinventing Collapse: The Soviet Example and American Prospects, published in 2008, further details his views. Discussing the book in 2009, in a piece in The New Yorker, Ben McGrath wrote that Orlov describes "superpower collapse soup" common to both the U.S. and the Soviet Union: "a severe shortfall in the production of crude oil, a worsening foreign-trade deficit, an oversized military budget, and crippling foreign debt". Orlov told interviewer McGrath that in recent months financial professionals had begun to make up more of his audience, joining "back-to-the-land types", "peak oilers", and those sometimes derisively called "doomers".

In his review of the book, commentator Thom Hartmann writes that Orlov holds that the Soviet Union hit a "soft crash" because of centralized planning in: housing, agriculture, and transportation left an infrastructure private citizens could co-opt so that no one had to pay rent or go homeless and people showed up for work, even when they were not paid. He writes that Orlov believes the U.S. will have a hard crash, more like Germany's Weimar Republic of the 1920s.

Writing on Creative Loafing, Wayne Davis considers Orlov's views and anecdotal stories to be an easy read for a serious subject. Orlov gives practical advice, like when to start accumulating goods for barter purposes and the need to buy goods that would sustain local communities - "hand tools, simple medications (and morphine), guns and ammo, sharpening stones, bicycles (and lots of tires with patch kits), etc." Orlov writes: "Much of the transformation is psychological and involves letting go of many notions that we have been conditioned to accept unquestioningly. In order to adapt, you will need plenty of free time. Granting yourself this time requires a leap of faith: you have to assume the future has already arrived." He also advises: "Beyond the matter of personal safety, you will need to understand who has what you need and how to get it from them."

The EnergyBulletin.Net review states that "Orlov's main goal is to get Americans to understand what it will mean to live without an economy, when cash is virtually useless and most people won't be getting any income anyway because they'll be out of a job." The review by author Carolyn Baker, notes that Orlov emphasizes that "when faced with a collapsing economy, one should stop thinking of wealth in terms of money". Physical resources and assets, as well as relationships and connections are worth more than cash and those who know how to "do it themselves" and operate on the margins of society will do better than those whose incomes and lifestyles have plummeted.

Author James Howard Kunstler, who has been described as "one of Orlov's greatest fans" but denies he is a "complete 'collapsitarian'", described the book as an "exceptionally clear, authoritative, witty, and original view of our prospects".

Not all commentary has been favorable. In a 2009 article in Mother Jones, Virginia Heffernan quoted someone who labels Orlov's position as "collapsitarianism" which she believes involves "a desire for complete economic meltdown" and writes that Orlov espouses "bourgeois survivalism".

=== The Five Stages of Collapse (2013) ===
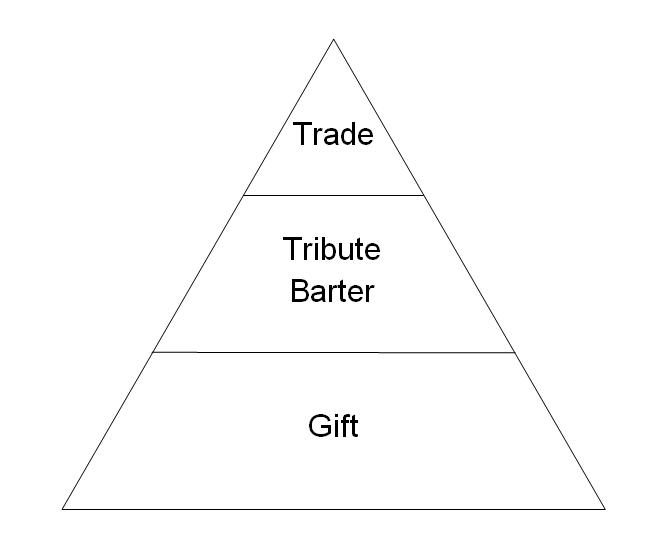
Pyramid of economic relations for most of human history, as described in The Five Stages of Collapse.

In his book The Five Stages of Collapse (2013), Dmitry Orlov describes these five possible stages:

1. Financial collapse: financial institutions become insolvent and banks close (example given: Iceland);
2. Economic collapse: shortages of essential goods and decomplexification of the economy (example given: Russian mafia);
3. Political collapse: corruption replaces government services (example given: Pashtuns);
4. Social collapse: loss of local social institutions and civil war (example given: Romani people);
5. Cultural collapse: loss of empathy and humanity (example given: Ik people);
6. Ecological collapse (proposed after publication of the book).

=== More recent writings ===
By 2019, Orlov felt that most of the ingredients precipitating collapse of the United States were in place, and that the one single ingredient still missing—a humiliating military defeat—was under way:

The function of the US military is to intimidate other countries into letting the US buy whatever it wants by printing US dollars as needed [...] Once their ability to intimidate the world into submission is gone [...] all that will remain of the "richest country in the world" is a pile of worthless paper. When precisely that moment arrives is anyone’s guess, but you shouldn’t need to time it exactly provided you can plan for it. I recommend that you do so—if you haven’t already.

From his new home in the rural Karelia region of the Russian Federation, Dmitry Orlov has clearly allied himself with Russian President Vladimir Putin, including supporting the 2022 invasion of Ukraine and repeating state media explanations of the situation in Ukraine, arguing that it is a "Special Military Operation" and not a war, and proclaiming the honesty and success of its stated purpose of "demilitarization and denazification".

=== Bibliography ===
- Orlov, Dmitry (2008). Reinventing Collapse: The Soviet Example and American Prospects. New Society Publishers. p. 208. ISBN 978-0-86571-685-8.
- Orlov, Dmitry (2012). Absolutely Positive. Dmitry Orlov. p. 138. ASIN B008047OTS
- Orlov, Dmitry (2013). The Five Stages of Collapse: Survivors' Toolkit. New Society Publishers. p. 288. ISBN 978-0-86571-736-7.
- Orlov, Dmitry (2016). Shrinking the Technosphere: Getting a Grip on Technologies That Limit Our Autonomy, Self-Sufficiency and Freedom. New Society Publishers. p. 256. ISBN 978-0-86571-838-8.

== See also ==
- David Fleming – English historian and economist (1940–2010)
- John Michael Greer – American writer and druid (born 1962)
- James Howard Kunstler – American writer, social critic, blogger
- Michael Ruppert – American writer and investigative journalist
