= Joan Ehrenfeld =

American environmental scientist and academic

Joan Gardner Ehrenfeld
- Born: 1948
- Died: 2011 (aged 62–63)
- Education: City University of New York; Harvard University; Barnard College
- Scientific career
- Workplaces: Rutgers University
- Thesis: Ecological interactions among three species of Euphorbia and their insect visitors in the American Southwest (1975)

Joan Gardner Ehrenfeld (1948 – 2011) was an American environmental scientist who was a professor at Rutgers University. Her research considered invasive species and ecology. She was elected Fellow of the American Association for the Advancement of Science in 2000.

== Early life and education ==
Ehrenfeld was born in New York City. Her mother was a violinist, but encouraged Ehrenfeld to have a career in the sciences. Ehrenfeld said she remembered reading Paul de Kruif's Microbe Hunters as a child. As a teenager, the National Science Foundation selected her for a summer placement in the laboratory of Donald Ritchie at Barnard College. She returned to Barnard College for undergraduate studies, where she specialized in biology. She also completed a summer program at Colorado State University, and spent time working in a molecular biology lab. Ehrenfeld moved to Harvard University, where she earned a master's degree in 1970. She was a doctoral researcher at the City University of New York, where she studied the ecological interactions of Euphorbia.

== Research and career ==
In 1976, Ehrenfeld was appointed to the faculty in the Center for Coastal and Environmental at Rutgers University. She was made Director of the New Jersey Water Resources Research Institute in 1990. Ehrenfeld worked on wetlands ecology and was particularly interested in the relationships between biodiversity and human disease. She extensively studied the spread of the West Nile virus.

Ehrenfeld investigated how the Berberis thunbergii (Japanese barberry) impacted soil processes and micro-organisms. She found that barberry tissue is high in nitrogen-rich compounds akaloids, which causes a loss of organic matter in nearby soil due to excessive nitrogen cycling. As barberry starts to decompose, the nitrate levels in nearby soil start to increase, making the areas susceptible to weeds. Ehrenfeld removed barberry in the Morristown National Historical Park and attempted to restore native shrubs (spice-bush and witch-hazel). These native plants could not survive, as the barberry had transformed the soil itself. She thus showed that just one plant can have a dramatic impact on its environment.

In 2012, the Ecological Society of America launched the Ehrenfeld Award to celebrate her contribution to urban ecology. In 2019, the New York–New Jersey Trail Conference established the Joan Ehrenfeld Award for Responsible Stewardship.

== Selected publications ==
- Joan G. Ehrenfeld (December 2010). "Ecosystem Consequences of Biological Invasions". Annual Review of Ecology, Evolution, and Systematics. 41 (1): 59–80. doi:10.1146/annurev-ecolsys-102209-144650. ISSN 1545-2069. Wikidata Q56095783.
- Joan G. Ehrenfeld (1 October 2003). "Effects of Exotic Plant Invasions on Soil Nutrient Cycling Processes". Ecosystems. 6 (6): 503–523. doi:10.1007/s10021-002-0151-3. ISSN 1432-9840. Wikidata Q55870644.
- Joan G. Ehrenfeld; Peter Kourtev; Weize Huang (October 2001). "Changes in Soil Functions Following Invasions of Exotic Understory Plants in Deciduous Forests". Ecological Applications. 11 (5): 1287. doi:10.2307/3060920. ISSN 1051-0761. JSTOR 3060920. Wikidata Q55845423.

== Awards and honours ==
- 1999 Cook College Academic Professional Excellence Award for Academic Innovation and Creativity
- 2000 Elected Fellow of the American Association for the Advancement of Science
- 2003 Research Excellence and Impact Award
- Science Advisory Board of the United States Environmental Protection Agency
- 2010 Elected Fellow of the Society of Wetland Scientists
- 2011 Research Excellence Award from the School of Environmental and Biological Sciences

== Personal life ==
Ehrenfeld had four children. Her husband, David Ehrenfeld, was a professor of biology at Rutgers University. In 2010, she was diagnosed with leukemia. She was an examiner for Swarthmore College. She was an active member of her town's progressive Jewish community, was a brilliant musician and student of music theory, and had a tremendously curious mind and a passion for a wide array of topics from Shakesperean literature to mycology. Ehrenfeld died on June 25, 2011.
