= Daeseong-dong =

Place in Gyeonggi Province, South Korea

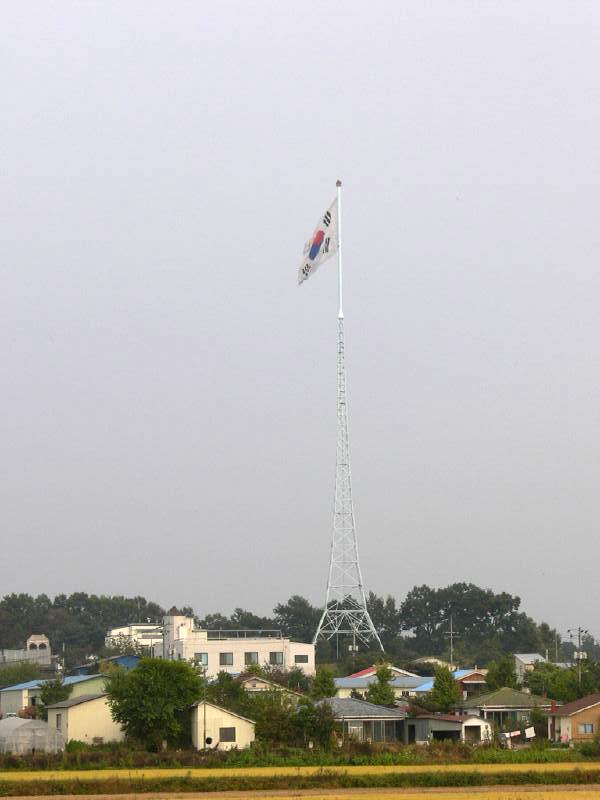
- The Daeseong-dong flagpole, flying the flag of South Korea

- Location in South Korea
- Coordinates: 37.941118°N 126.679144°E
- Country: South Korea
- Province: Gyeonggi Province
- City: Paju

Population (2024)
  - Total: 138

Korean name
- Hangul: 대성동
- Hanja: 臺城洞
- RR: Daeseong-dong
- MR: Taesŏng-dong

Daeseong-dong (Korean: 대성동; also called Tae Sung Dong, and Jayu-ui Maeul) is a village in South Korea close to the North Korean border. It lies within the Korean Demilitarized Zone (DMZ). The village is about 1.6 kilometres (1 mile) south of the Bridge of No Return, and 12 km (7.5 miles) from the city of Kaesong, North Korea. As of 2024, the village has 138 residents, mostly elderly.

== Location ==
Daeseong-dong belongs administratively to Josan-ri, Gunnae-myeon, in Paju. It is the only civilian habitation within the southern portion of the DMZ. Panmunjeom is 1 km (0.6 mi) to the northeast, and the actual Military Demarcation Line (the de facto border between South and North Korea) is only 350 meters (1,150 feet) west of the village. Only individuals who lived in the village before the Korean War, or are descendants of those who did, are allowed to move to the village.

Daeseong-dong is only 1.6 km (1 mi) from Kijong-dong, a village in North Korea's portion of the DMZ. Here Korea's division is starkly apparent: rival national flags can be seen on gigantic flagpoles that have been erected in the two villages.

While the southern half of the DMZ is under the administration of the United Nations Command, the residents of Daesong-dong are considered South Korean civilians, and subject to South Korean laws. These residents have some unique benefits and restrictions. For example, they have the same rights to vote and receive education, but are exempt from national defense duties and taxation. Residents are also allocated large plots of land and have some of the highest farming income in the nation. However, they are subject to limitations. The safety of the villagers is paramount, since North Korean soldiers can and have crossed the border. Visitors invited to the village must apply for a military escort two weeks in advance. There is a curfew and headcount at 23:00 local time.

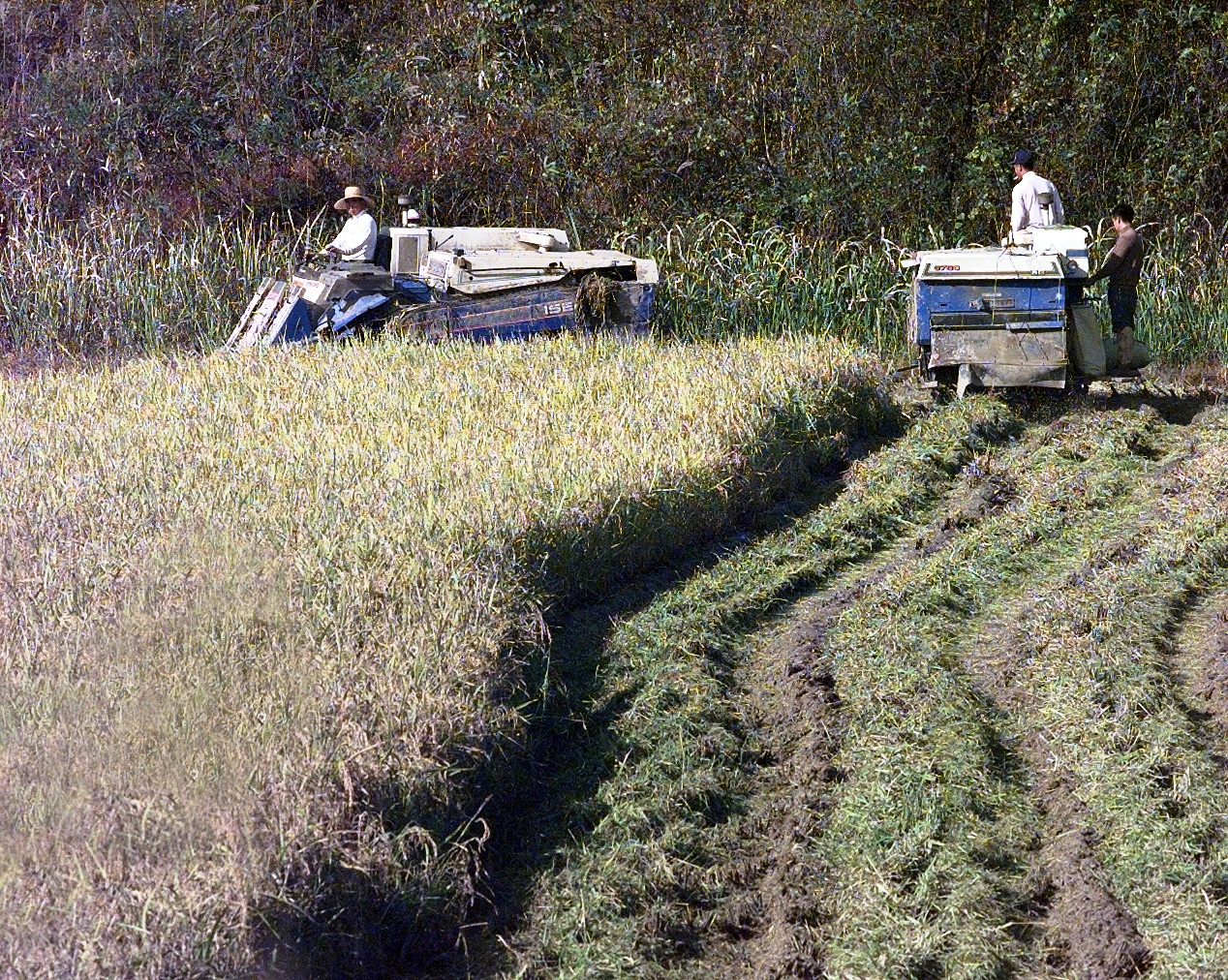
Rice harvest in Daeseong-dong, 1998

== Economy ==
Farming is the primary economic activity of the village, particularly bags of rice sold with a DMZ brand. DMZ rice (also known as Cheolwon Odae rice) is considered to be of a much higher quality than ordinary rice due to the environment that it's grown in, and the lack of pesticides that would otherwise be routinely applied elsewhere. Farming income is reported to be approximately $80,000 USD annually per family.

== Elementary school ==
The village also has a small elementary school, Daeseong-dong Elementary School. The school, once slated for closure due to the changing demographics of the village, educated in 2011 a total of thirty children from grades K-6, with a waiting list to get in due to the funding and attention it receives from the South Korean government. As of 2024, the school has six students per class, most of whom are bussed in from outside the DMZ.

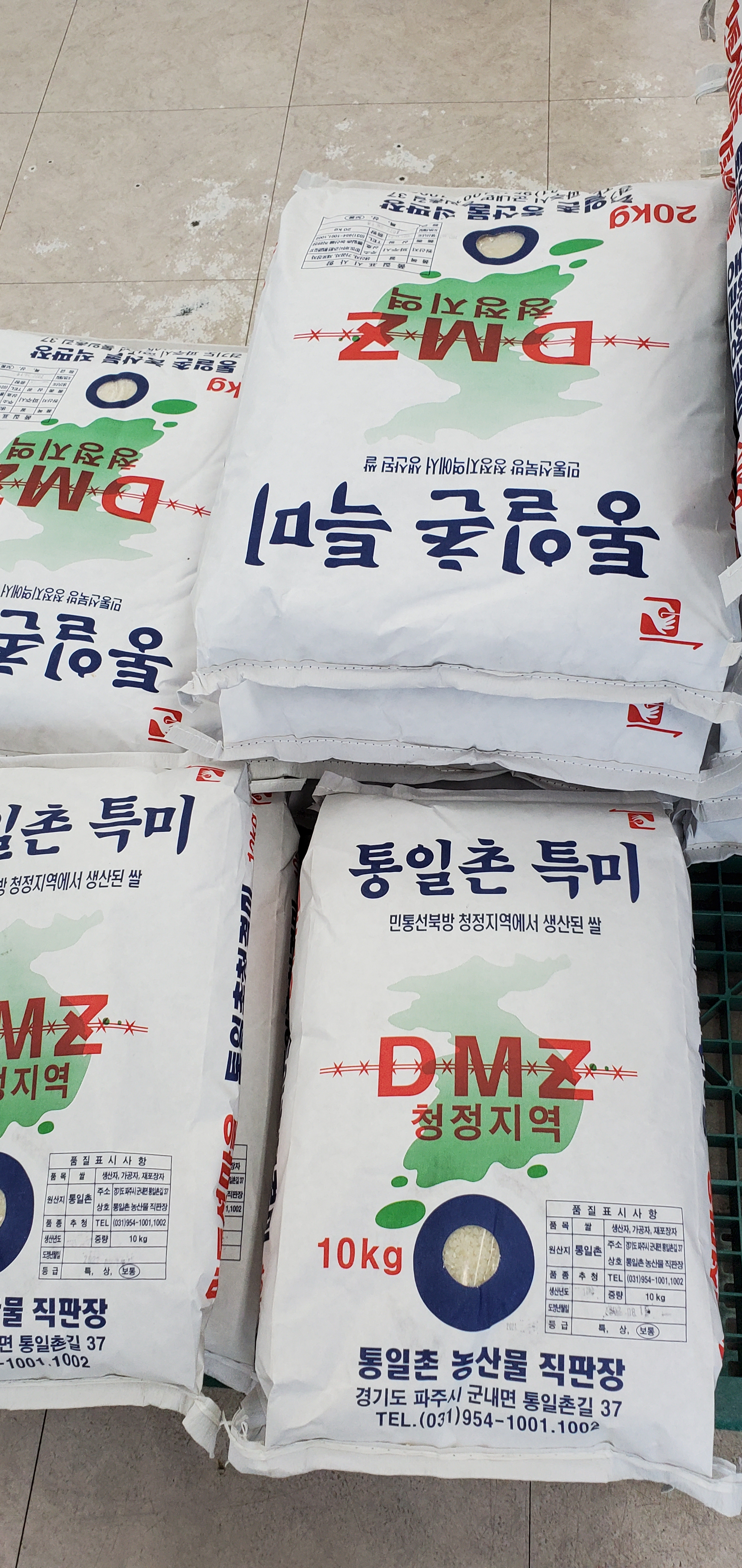
10kg & 20kg sacks of rice bearing the DMZ brand, sold in Daeseong-dong

== Flagpoles ==
In the 1980s, the South Korean government built a 100 m (328 ft) flagpole in Daeseong-dong, which flies a South Korean flag weighing 130 kilograms (287 pounds). In what some have called the "flagpole war", the North Korean government responded by building the 160 m (525 ft) Panmunjeom flagpole in Kijŏng-dong, only 1.2 km (0.7 mi) west of the South Korean border. It flies a 270 kg (595 lb) flag of North Korea.
