= Panmun-guyok =

Panmun-guyok 판문구역
- Ward

Korean transcription(s)
  - Hanja: 板門區域
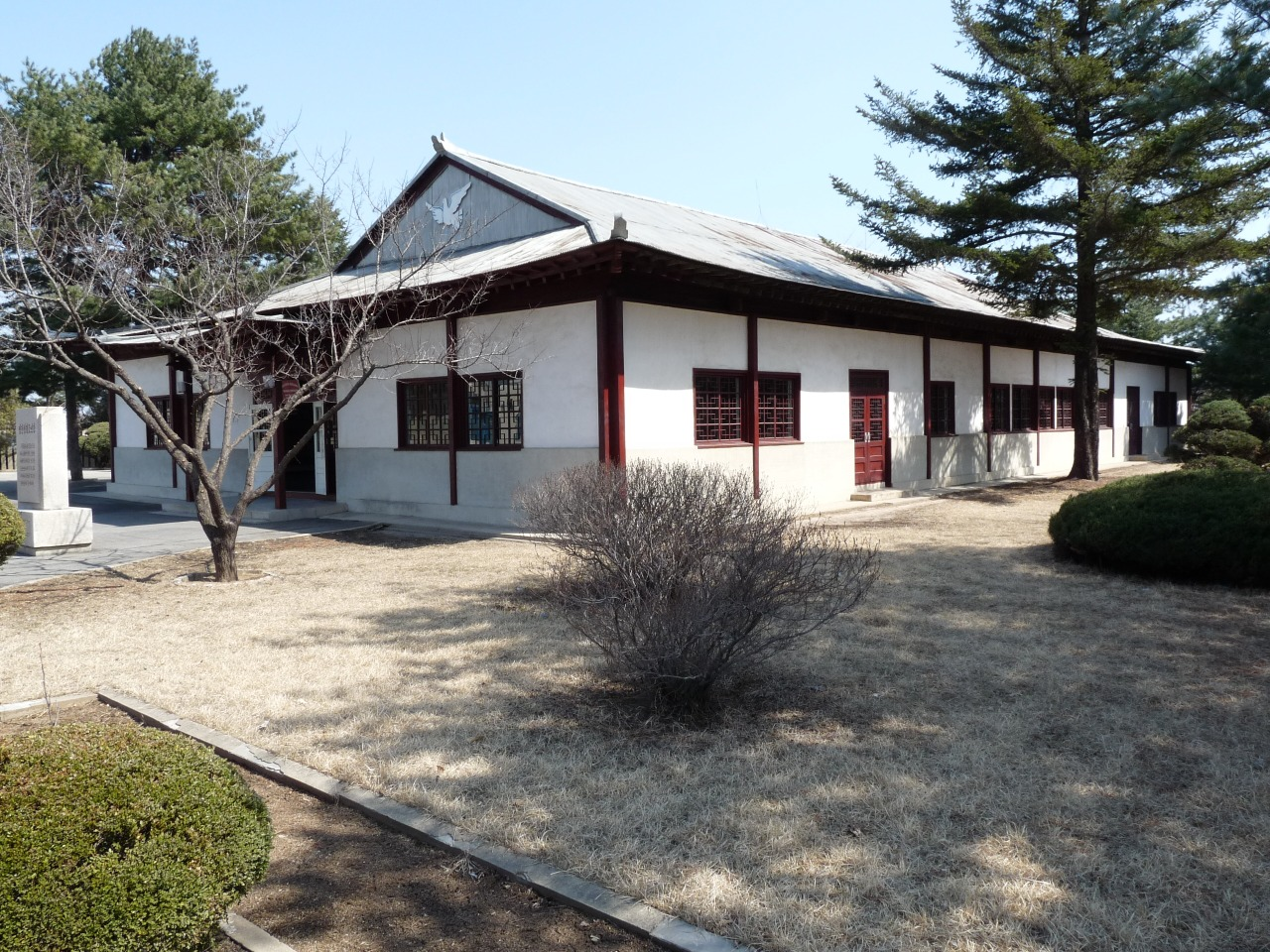
- North Korea Peace Museum located in this district

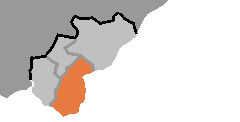
- Map of Kaesong Special City showing the location of Panmun
- Country: North Korea
- Special city: Kaesŏng-T'ŭkpyŏlsi
- Administrative divisions: 2 tong, 13 ri

P'anmun-guyŏk is a ward in Kaesong, North Korea.

== History ==
In December 1952, during the Korean War, P'anmun County was established due to the reorganization of administrative divisions in North Korea. The name of the county is taken from Panmunjom, where armistice talks were held at the time.

In January 1955, Kaep'ung County and P'anmun County in North Hwanghae Province belonged to Kaesong District.

In June 1957, when Kaesong District was promoted to Kaesong Directly Governed City, P'anmun County belonged to it.

P'anmun County disappeared in November 2002. After Kaesong Special City was established in October 2019, P'anmun-guyŏk was established in April 2020.

== Administrative divisions ==
Due to the private nature of North Korea, it is hard to verify it without officially published material from North Korea.However, these are the names of tong (neighbourhoods) and ri (villages) that is known to have existed in the district so far to the outside world throughout its history. Whether it currently exists is unknown.

- P'anmun 1-tong
  (판문1동/板門1洞):Known of its existence in a 2014 article of Rodong Sinmun
- P'anmun 2-tong
  (판문2동/板門2洞)
- Taeryong-ri
  (대룡리/大龍里):Not known of its existence from reports since 2004.
- Sangdo-ri
  (상도리/上道里)
- Ryŏngjŏng-ri
  (령정리/嶺井里)
- Sinhŭng-ri
  (신흥리/新興里)
- Chogang-ri
  (조강리/祖江里):The town Of Amsil is located here.
- Rimhal-li
  (림한리/臨漢里)
- Tŏksu-ri
  (덕수리/德水里)
- Sŏnchŏng-ri
  (선적리/仙跡里)
- P'anmunjŏm-ri
  (판문점리/板門店里)
- P'yŏnghwa-ri
  (평화리/平和里)
- Ch'aeryŏn-ni
  (채련리/採蓮里):Known since 2018, possibly created after.
- Tongnae-ri
  (동내리/東內里):Known since 2018, possibly created after.
- Aep'o-ri
  (애포리/艾浦里):Known since 2018, possibly created after.

== Transport ==
P'anmun is served by P'anmun and Pongdong stations of the Korean State Railway. These are both on the P'yŏngbu line.

== Notable places ==
Hurung, the royal tomb of the 2nd king of the Joseon dynasty is located here. Kaesong Industrial Complex is in this area.

== See also ==
- Geography of North Korea
- Administrative divisions of North Korea
- Kijong-dong - Propaganda Village
