= Kijong-dong =

Supposed village in North Korea, north of the DMZ

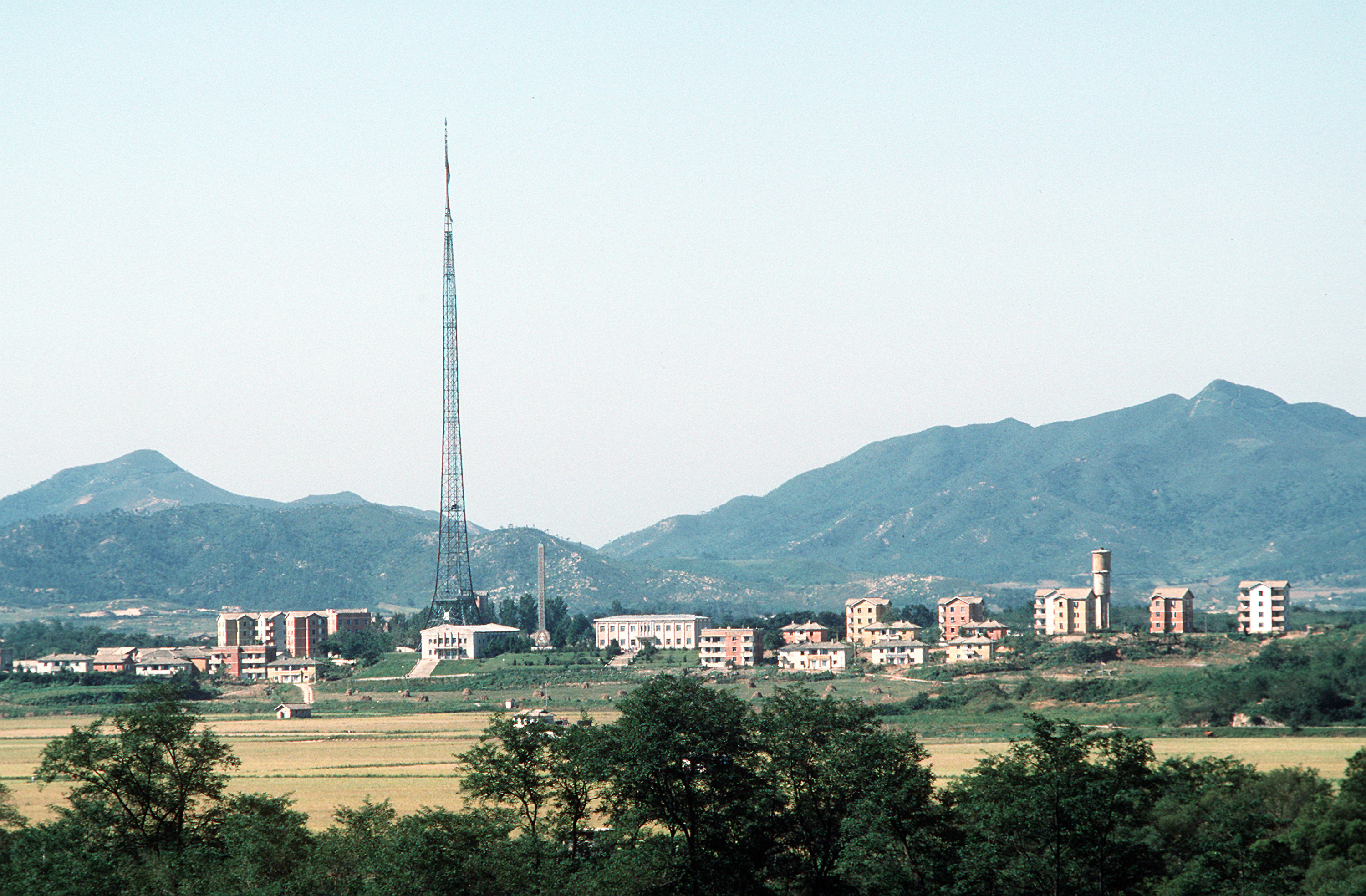
- The Panmunjom flagpole, flying the flag of North Korea.
- Nicknames: Peace Village; Propaganda Village
- Location in North Korea
- Coordinates: 37.9453°N 126.6556°E
- Country: North Korea
- Special city: Kaesŏng-T'ŭkpyŏlsi
- Ward: P'anmun-guyŏk
- ri: P'yŏnghwa-ri

Korean name
- Hangul: 기정동
- Hanja: 機井洞
- RR: Gijeong-dong
- MR: Kijŏng-dong

Kijŏng-dong, Kijŏngdong, Kijŏng tong or Kaepoong is a Potemkin village in P'yŏnghwa-ri (Korean: 평화리; Hanja: 平和里), Panmun-guyok, (Note: P'yŏnghwa-ri belonged to P'anmun-gun (판문군; 板門郡) until the creation of Kaesong Industrial Region in November 2002, when P'anmun-gun was dissolved and its territory divided among Kaesong, Changp'ung-gun and Kaep'ung-gun, P'yŏnghwa-ri joined Kaesong. in April 2020, P'yŏnghwa-ri incorporated with Panmun-guyok.) Kaesong Special City, North Korea. It is situated in the North's half of the Korean Demilitarized Zone (DMZ). Also known in North Korea as Peace Village (Korean: 평화촌; Hanja: 平和村; MR: P'yŏnghwach'on), it has been widely referred to as "Propaganda Village" (Korean: 선전마을; Hanja: 宣傳마을; RR: Seonjeon maeul) by those outside North Korea, especially in South Korean and Western media.

Kijŏng-dong is one of two villages permitted to remain in the 4 km (2.5 mi) wide DMZ set up under the 1953 armistice during the Korean War; the other is the South Korean village of Daeseong-dong, 2.22 kilometers (1.38 mi) away.

== History ==
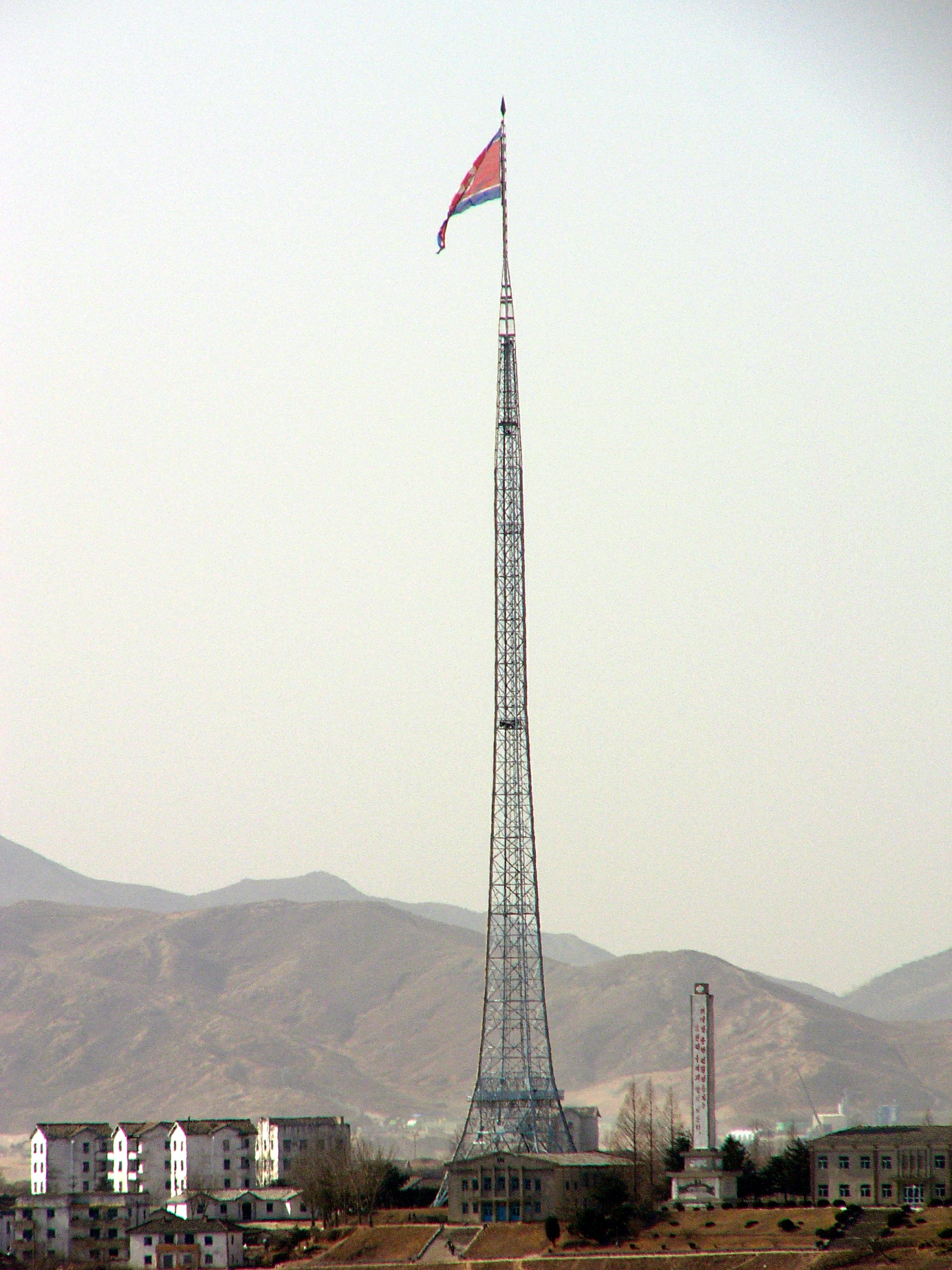
The Panmunjom flagpole, the world's seventh-tallest, 160 m (525 ft) in height, flying a 270 kg (595 lb) flag of North Korea over Kijŏng-dong, near Panmunjom.

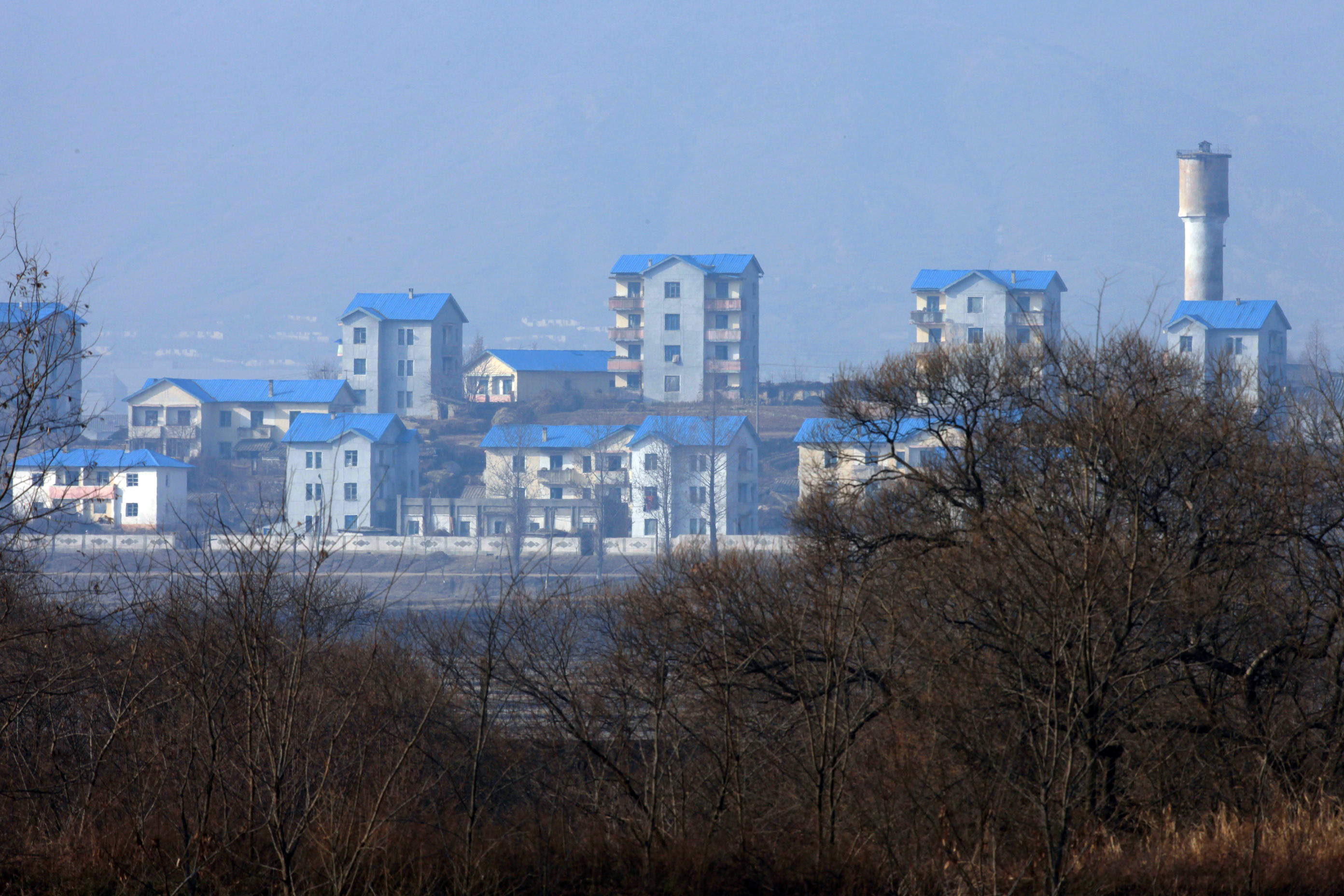
View of Kijŏng-dong

The North Korean government says the village contains a 200-family collective farm, serviced by a child care center, kindergarten, primary and secondary schools, and a hospital. However, it is widely considered an uninhabited settlement built in the 1950s as part of a propaganda campaign to encourage South Korean defection. Some parts are used to garrison Korean People's Army soldiers manning a network of artillery positions, fortifications and underground marshalling bunkers along this part of the DMZ.

The village features a number of brightly painted, poured-concrete multi-story buildings. Its layout is oriented so that the buildings' bright blue roofs and multi-colored walls beneath Kijong-dong's massive DPRK flag and flagpole, can be clearly seen from the South Korean border. From the border, the main way of observing the village and surrounding ares is from the Dora Observatory, which provides binoculars to visitors to the DMZ.

As usual in North Korea, buildings in the village feature propaganda dedicated to the country's leaders. A mural to the Kim Family can be seen near the flagpole, reading "Great comrades Kim Il Sung and Kim Jong Il will be with us forever". A mural dedicated to Kim Jong Un can be spotted as well, reading "Long live General Kim Jong Un, the sun of Korean Songun".

The village has been widely described as a potemkin village. According to observers, windows appear to be either left unglazed or just painted onto exterior walls, and electrical lights on timers periodically turn on and off in some buildings. The buildings are said to be concrete shells that are maintained by caretakers in an effort to preserve the illusion of activity.

Nonetheless, some limited civilian activity has been reported in the area by foreign journalists. Workers can be seen during farming season, working the agricultural fields surrounding the village. A 2016 farming season report from the South Korean channel MBC, made with footage from the Aegibong Observatory near the border, was able to attest further activity in the village, such as children attending school. Laundry was also spotted hanging from the windows. However, the reporters noted the "very shabby and old" appearance of the buildings, and an "eerie and bleak" atmosphere.

Regarding the apparent civilian activity in the village, an MBC reporter noted that "it is said that during the spring rice planting season and fall harvest season, residents from the region are mobilized to farm, brought [to Kijong-dong] to work, and then withdrawn again when the work is finished".

=== Flagpole ===
In the 1980s, the South Korean government built a 100 m (328 ft) tall flagpole with a 130-kilogram (287 lb) flag of South Korea in Daeseong-dong (37°56′30.24″N 126°40′48.07″E).

The North Korean government responded by building an even taller one, the Panmunjom flagpole, at 160 m (525 ft) with a 270 kg (595 lb) flag of North Korea in Kijŏng-dong, 1.2 km (0.7 mi) across the demarcation line from South Korea (37°56′42.99″N 126°39′18.78″E), in what some have called the "flagpole war". For over a decade, the flagpole was the tallest in the world. In 2010, the flagpole became the second-tallest flagpole in the world at the time, after the National Flag Square in Baku, Azerbaijan, at 162 m (531 ft). It is now the seventh-tallest flagpole in the world, and the tallest supported one.

=== Propaganda loudspeakers ===
Massive loudspeakers mounted on several of the buildings deliver DPRK propaganda broadcasts directed towards the South. Originally, the content extolled the North's virtues in great detail and urged disgruntled soldiers and farmers simply to walk across the border to be received as brothers. As its value in inducing defections diminished over time, particularly as South Korea caught up with the North economically in the 1960s and 1970s, the content was switched to condemnatory anti-Western speeches, agitprop operas, and patriotic marching music for up to 20 hours a day. For a period from 2004 to 2016, both North and South agreed to end their loudspeaker broadcasts at each other. The broadcasts resumed after escalating tensions as a result of the January 2016 nuclear test. On 23 April 2018, both North and South Korea officially cancelled their border propaganda broadcasts.

== Notes ==
Records
Preceded by _____	World's tallest flagpole 1982 – September 2010	Succeeded by National Flag Square
