= David Ehrenfeld =

American professor

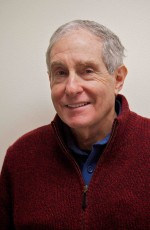
- Education: Harvard University, University of Florida
- Known for: Forerunning 20th-century conservation biology; author of The Arrogance of Humanism; founding editor of the journal Conservation Biology
- Spouse: Joan Ehrenfeld
- Children: 4
- Awards: Fellow of the American Association for the Advancement of Science; Annual award of the Society for Conservation Biology (1993); Barbara Munson Goff Rutgers School of Environmental and Biological Sciences Teacher of the Year (2011)
- Scientific career
- Fields: Biology, conservation biology, ecology
- Workplaces: Rutgers University

David Ehrenfeld is an American professor of biology at Rutgers University and is the author of over a dozen publications, including The Arrogance of Humanism (1978), Becoming Good Ancestors: How We Balance Nature, Community, and Technology (2009), and Swimming Lessons: Keeping Afloat in the Age of Technology (2002). He is often described as one of the forerunners of twentieth-century conservation biology. Ehrenfeld's work primarily deals with the inter-related topics of biodiversity, conservation, and sustainability. He is also the founding editor of Conservation Biology, a peer-reviewed scientific journal that deals with conserving the biodiversity of Earth, and has written for various magazines and newspapers including The New York Times, the Los Angeles Times, and Harper's Magazine.

== Personal life ==
=== Education ===
Ehrenfeld attended Harvard University for both his undergraduate and medical school studies, where he received his MD in 1963. He later attended the University of Florida in 1967, where he earned a PhD in zoology. As a professor at Rutgers, Ehrenfeld teaches both graduate and undergraduate courses in ecology.

=== Adult life ===
Ehrenfeld is the father of four children and the grandfather of seven grandchildren. His wife, Joan Ehrenfeld, worked as an ecology professor at Rutgers University alongside David for 35 years. Like her husband, she served the scientific community in a variety of ways. She participated in National Science Foundation panels, reviewed articles for scholarly journals, and was appointed as a member of the Science Advisory Board of the United States Environmental Protection Agency. AAAS fellow Joan Ehrenfeld, an expert on invasive species, wetlands ecology, and urban ecology, died at her home in Highland Park, New Jersey on June 25, 2011, after a year-long battle with acute leukemia.

== Career ==
Throughout his life, Ehrenfeld has written a number of books elaborating on the issues of social ecology and the ever-present dangers of technology. From 1970-1980, Ehrenfeld published Biological Conservation, Conserving Life on Earth, The Arrogance of Humanism, and The Chameleon Variant. Amid the years from 1980-2009, he published the likes of Beginning Again: People and Nature in the New Millennium, Swimming Lessons: Keeping Afloat in the Age of Technology, and Becoming Good Ancestors: How We Balance Nature, Community, and Technology. The underlying themes in all of his literature are linked in some way or another and serve to portray Ehrenfeld's genuine concern for the progression of human society.

=== Early work ===
==== Conserving Life on Earth (1972) ====
The central theme in this book revolves around the idea that biodiversity among species must be preserved in order to maintain a healthy balance in nature and society. Ehrenfeld offers many examples of how natural communities are jeopardized through the actions of humans. For instance, the actions of the United States Army Corps of engineers, which threatened ecosystems within the Oklawaha River valley in Florida, and the numerous problems associated with preserving Pacific Coast Redwood communities, are utilized as case-studies to elucidate the impact of human activity on the environment. The case-studies are complemented with several discussions of how modern landscapes are changing due to human activities such as agriculture, public construction, and pollution. With all of these implications in mind, Ehrenfeld explains why, as a result, extinction rates are higher than ever and that the "Sixth Great Extinction" is currently under way, which has created ecological animosity among local and global communities throughout the world. The ideas expressed by him in this book are similar to those exhibited by ecologists Barry Commoner and Jane Jacobs.

==== The Arrogance of Humanism (1978) ====
Ehrenfeld states that the arrogance exhibited by today's society is attributed to humans' over-dependence on technology to solve environmental and social problems. He concludes that the intelligence of humans can not simply solve everything and that until humans accept this fact, society will not truly progress. Ehrenfeld utilizes a pessimistic tone in the course of this book in regards to these "arrogant" assumptions made by modern society. He states that, "We must live in our century and wait, enduring somehow the unavoidable sadness ... nothing is free of the taint of our arrogance. We have defiled everything, much of it forever, even the farthest jungles of the Amazon and the air above the mountains, even the everlasting sea which gave us birth." Environmentalist David Orr accentuates the main points of this book when he states Ehrenfeld's belief that Americans lack the science of land health that Aldo Leopold described in the early twentieth century. This book is widely regarded as one of Ehrenfeld's most influential works.

==== Beginning Again: People and Nature in the New Millennium (1993) ====
Throughout this publication, a wide array of suggestions are offered to perpetuate a more sustainable life in the new millennium. Ehrenfeld urges people of society to embrace a more refined ecological awareness of advancing agricultural technology, carbon dioxide emissions, disappearing fauna, and global biodiversity. As described by philosopher Bryan Norton, "The lessons of Beginning Again are usually about the limits of general knowledge and the unlikelihood that expertise will solve the innumerable problems that arise within a society obsessed with information and centralized control." In sum, the underlying message of this story outlines the dangers present in relying on technical expertise to solve the social and environmental problems of today.

=== Later work ===
==== Swimming Lessons: Keeping Afloat in the Age of Technology (2002) ====
Similar to the writing style of Becoming Good Ancestors: How we Balance Nature, Community, and Technology, the author employs a number of narratives to establish the main themes present throughout this novel. For example, in his chapter entitled "Rejecting Gifts," Ehrenfeld discusses how the values of modern society are steadily deteriorating through the "rejection" of the perennial gifts that Earth offers to humans such as economically viable resources. Ehrenfeld insists that, "The life of contemporary civilization is like the fairy tale of the three little pigs and the big bad wolf in reverse. Having started with a house of brick, we have moved, with great fanfare, to a house of straw; it is hard to concoct a happy ending for such a story." All in all, the main objective of this book works to emphasize the relationship between technology and the environment while also outlining how corporate economics play an influential role in how the environment is shaped. University

==== Becoming Good Ancestors: How we Balance Nature, Community, and Technology (2009) ====
A volume pieced together with several anecdotes to portray the overshadowing effects of technology on modern ecological thought. Ehrenfeld goes on to delineate the limits of human capacity and how technology alone will not be able to solve the various environmental issues that society faces today. He draws upon specific examples of how technology will never replace natural energy sources like crude oil. The book as a whole focuses on the effects of modern society on nature and how negative patterns are reversible through the moral judgment and intelligence of humans to make changes that will positively impact the future.

== Awards and honors ==
In his tenure, Ehrenfeld has procured a number of teaching awards. He was elected a fellow of the American Association for the Advancement of Science, was the recipient of the annual award of the Society for Conservation Biology in 1993, and was named the Barbara Munson Goff Rutgers School of Environmental and Biological Sciences Teacher of the Year in 2011.

== Reception ==
Ehrenfeld is widely regarded as one of the most prominent conservation biologists in the world. With more than forty years of teaching experience under his belt at Rutgers, he has come into contact with hundreds of students and colleagues. As a result, Ehrenfeld is warmly received throughout campus for his rapport with students and faculty.

Many of his critics, such as sociologist Robert Bierstedt, argue that his literature contains a pessimistic connotation and that he speaks through sermons in his writings. These critics claim that Ehrenfeld's literature presents a bleak future and tends to focus more on the negative aspects of society towards the environment. Yet, others insist that his work represents optimistic viewpoints in that it depicts the capacity of humans to reverse the forewarned implications of humans' environmental actions.

== Publications ==
Apart from select book chapters, Ehrenfeld has written:

- "Urban Wetlands: An Opportunity for Environmental Conservation in China," Asian Journal of Ecotoxicology, vol 4(2) 295-299. (2009)
- Becoming Good Ancestors: How We Balance Nature, Community, and Technology (2009)
- "The Environmental Limits to Globalization," Conservation Biology, 19 (2) 318-326. (2005)
- "Sustainability: Living with imperfection," Conservation Biology, 19 (1) 33-35. (2005)
- Swimming Lessons: Keeping Afloat in the Age of Technology (2002)
- "A Postscript to Orr's Commandments," Conservation Biology, 15(4): 825-826. (2001)
- "War and Peace and Conservation Biology," Conservation Biology, 14(1): 105-112. (2000)
- Beginning Again: People and Nature in the New Millennium (1993)
- The Chameleon Variant (1980)
- The Arrogance of Humanism (1978)
- Conserving Life on Earth (1972)
- Biological Conservation (1970)
