= Panmunjom =

Former village in Korea

Panmunjom Panmunjeom
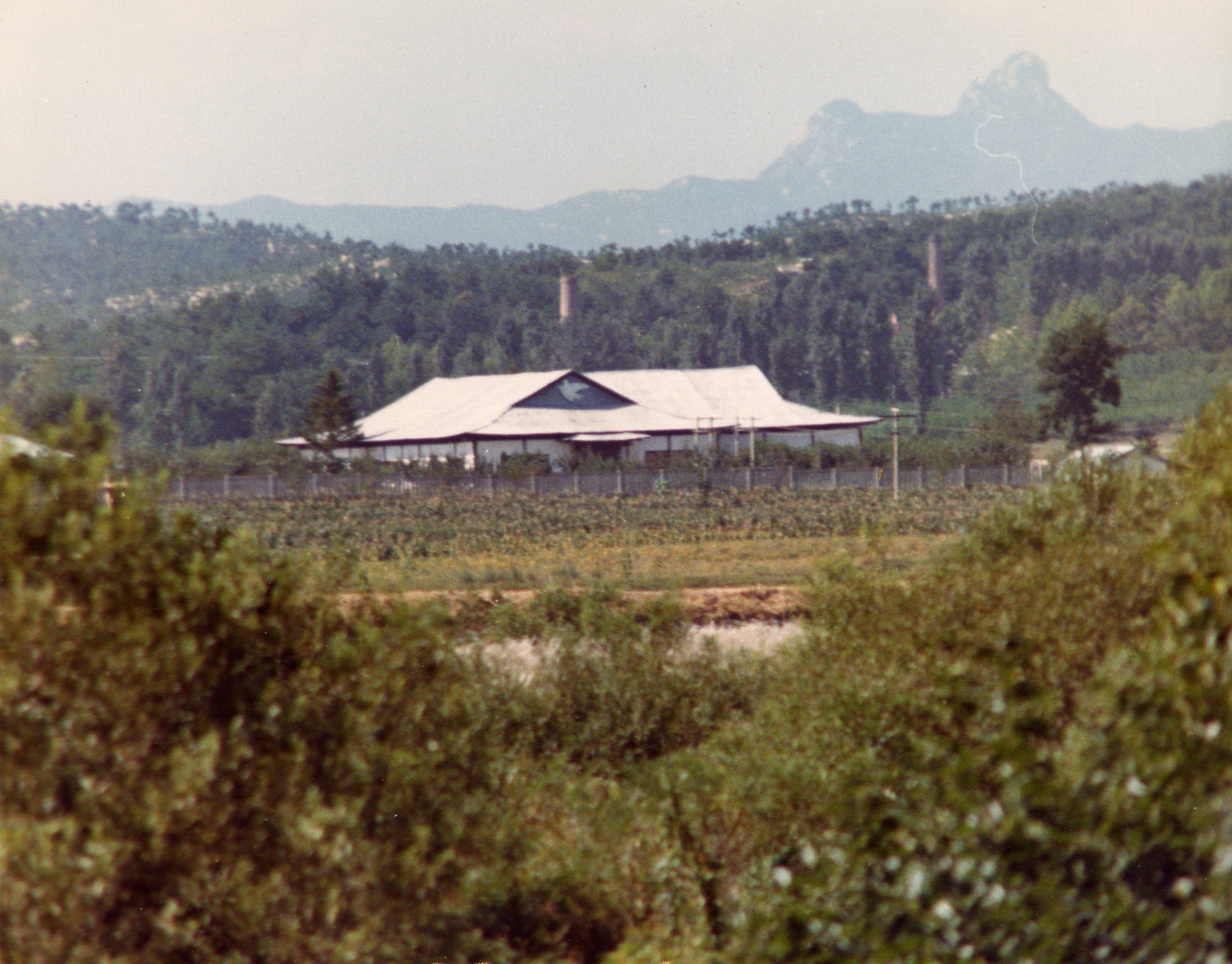
- The original truce building in 1976, after it became the DPRK Peace Museum

- Location within South Korea
- Coordinates: 37°57′36″N 126°39′54″E
- Country before the Korean War: First Republic of Korea
- Modern countries: North Korea; South Korea
- Special city: Kaesong
- Ward: Panmun-guyok
- Province: Gyeonggi
- City: Paju

Korean name
- Hangul: 판문점
- Hanja: 板門店
- RR: Panmunjeom
- MR: P'anmunjŏm

Panmunjom (Korean: 판문점; also spelled Panmunjeom) was a village just north of the de facto border between North Korea and South Korea, where the 1953 Korean Armistice Agreement that ended the Korean War was signed. It was located in what is now Paju, Gyeonggi Province, South Korea, and Panmun-guyok, Kaesong, North Korea. The building where the armistice was signed still stands.

Its name is often used as a metonym for the nearby Joint Security Area (JSA), where discussions between North Korea and South Korea still take place in blue buildings that straddle the Military Demarcation Line. As such, it is considered one of the last vestiges of the Cold War.

== Location ==
The site of the former village is 53 kilometers north-northwest of Seoul, South Korea, and 10 kilometers east of Kaesong. The village, a small cluster of fewer than ten huts, is on the south side of the Kaesong-Seoul road on the west bank of the Sa'cheon stream. Meetings of the Military Armistice Commission took place in several tents set up on the north side.

The eighteen copies of Volume I and II of the armistice were signed by the senior delegates of each side in a building constructed by both sides over a 48-hour period. (North Korea provided labour and some supplies, while the United Nations Command provided some supplies, generators and lighting to allow the work to continue at night.)

After the Armistice Agreement was signed, construction began in September 1953 on a new site, the JSA, located approximately one kilometer east of the village. All meetings between North Korea and the United Nations Command or South Korea have taken place here since its completion. The JSA is often referred to as Panmunjom.

After the war, all civilians were removed from the Korean Demilitarized Zone (DMZ), except for two villages near the JSA on opposite sides of the Military Demarcation Line. After that, the empty village of Panmunjom fell into disrepair and eventually disappeared from the landscape. There is no evidence of it today. However, the building constructed for the signing of the armistice has since been renamed by North Korea as the Peace Museum.

== Truce talks and POW issue ==
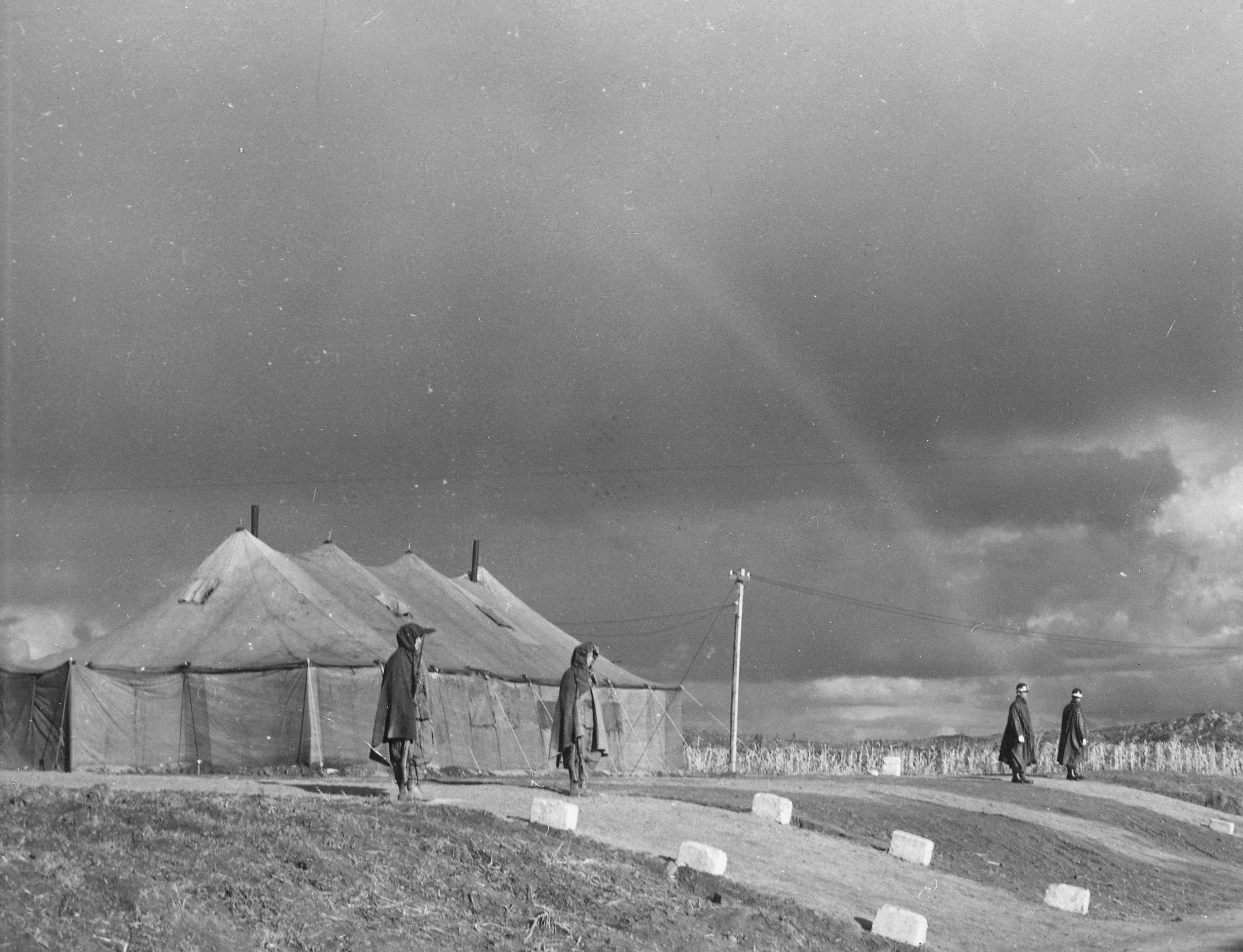
Site of negotiations in 1951

United Nations forces met with North Korean and Chinese officials at Panmunjom from 1951 to 1953 for truce talks. The talks dragged on for many months. The main point of contention during the talks was the question surrounding the prisoners of war. Moreover, South Korea was uncompromising in its demand for a unified state. On 8 June 1953, an agreement to the POW problem was reached.

Those prisoners who refused to return to their countries were allowed to live under a neutral supervising commission for three months. At the end of this period, those who still refused repatriation would be released. Among those who refused repatriation were 21 American and one British POWs, all but two of whom chose to defect to China.

A final armistice agreement was reached on 27 July 1953. The United Nations Command, Chinese People's Liberation Army, and North Korea People's Army agreed to an armistice ending the fighting. The agreement established a 4-kilometer-wide demilitarized zone along the armistice line, effectively dividing Korea into two separate countries. Although most troops and all heavy weapons were to be removed from the area, it has been heavily armed by both sides since the end of the fighting.

== See also ==
- North Korea Uncovered
- Daeseong-dong – a South Korean village within the DMZ
- Kijŏng-dong – a North Korean village within the DMZ
- Peace House
- April 2018 inter-Korean summit
- May 2018 inter-Korean summit
