= Jennifer Armstrong =

Jennifer, Jen or Jenny Armstrong may refer to:

- Jennifer Armstrong (writer) (born 1961), American children's writer
- Jenny Armstrong (born 1970), Olympic sailor for New Zealand and Australia
- Jennifer Armstrong (British Columbia curler) in 2010 Curlers Corner Autumn Gold Curling Classic
- Jennifer Armstrong (curler) (born 1992), New Brunswick curler
- Jennifer Armstrong (politician) (born c. 1989), member of the Alaska House of Representatives
- Jennifer Armstrong, one of the Candidates of the 2007 Australian federal election
- Jennifer Armstrong, character in Five Run Away Together
- Jen Armstrong, former cast member on The Real Housewives of Orange County
