= The Long Emergency =

2005 book by James Howard Kunstler

The Long Emergency: Surviving the Converging Catastrophes of the Twenty-first Century
- First edition
- Author: James Howard Kunstler
- Language: English
- Publisher: Atlantic Monthly Press
- Publication date: 2005

The Long Emergency: Surviving the Converging Catastrophes of the Twenty-first Century is a book by James Howard Kunstler (Grove/Atlantic, 2005) exploring the consequences of a world oil production peak, coinciding with the forces of climate change, resurgent diseases, water scarcity, global economic instability and warfare to cause major trouble for future generations.

The book's principal theme explores the effects of a peak in oil extraction on American society as well as the rest of the world. In both this book and in his other writings, Kunstler argues that the economic upheavals caused by peak oil will force Americans to live in more localized, self-sufficient communities.

It was followed by two other books, Too Much Magic (2012) and Living in the Long Emergency (2020).

== Synopsis ==
Kunstler's premise is that "cheap, plentiful" and easy-to-find oil is the foundation of industrial society and the pervasiveness of its effects is not widely appreciated. Through the 21st century, hydrocarbons like oil and natural gas will become increasingly difficult to obtain, becoming increasingly expensive and ultimately unavailable. Scarcity of petroleum will cause significant problems for transportation and generation of electrical power. In addition, shipping of food and manufactured items will become increasingly expensive, ultimately prohibitively so. Also, natural gas is vitally important to food production as it is the raw material for much of commercial crop fertilizers. In the industrialized West, most food production and manufacturing is performed far from, and generally abstracted away from the consumer.

The author further argues that alternative sources of energy will be insufficient. As petroleum sources become scarce, environmentally harmful or risky technologies such as coal and nuclear will become necessary but not sufficient for our energy needs. Hydroelectric, solar, and wind power, even in combination with coal and nuclear, will also be far from sufficient. Kunstler does not consider hydrogen to be a true energy source since one cannot drill into the earth and obtain hydrogen. Hydrogen must be extracted from other energy sources, such as natural gas or using electricity at a total net loss of energy.

Kunstler states that, as energy becomes scarce, transportation will become difficult or impossible, causing food and other necessary commodities to become unavailable in many communities. It will be necessary for local communities to become self-sufficient for food production, but many communities will be unable to do so, particularly large cities. The result will be mass starvation, disease, and civil unrest. Kunstler suggests that governments will be incapable of managing these problems. This period of scarcity and collapse will possibly last for a long time, hence the "long" emergency of the book's title.

Kunstler, a long-time critic of suburban design, advises people should begin learning to grow food.

== Reception ==
In his review for the Daily Camera, Jim Charlier praised the book as a powerful and urgent contribution to doomsday literature, challenging conventional thinking with its proposition of temporary human ascendancy and recommending it as essential reading.

== See also ==
- Urban agriculture
- Geoffrey Parker (historian)
