= The Geography of Nowhere =

1993 book by James Howard Kunstler

The Geography of Nowhere: The Rise and Decline of America's Man-Made Landscape
- First edition
- Author: James Howard Kunstler
- Language: English
- Genre: Urban planning, Nonfiction
- Publisher: Simon & Schuster
- Publication date: 1993
- Publication place: United States
- Media type: Print (Hardback & Paperback)
- Pages: 303 pp (first edition)
- ISBN: 978-0-671-70774-3 (first edition)
- OCLC: 34355662

The Geography of Nowhere: The Rise and Decline of America's Man-Made Landscape is a book written in 1993 by James Howard Kunstler exploring the effects of suburban sprawl, civil planning, and the automobile on American society and is an attempt to discover how and why suburbia has ceased to be a credible human habitat, and what society might do about it. Kunstler proposes that by reviving civic art and civic life, we will rediscover public virtue and a new vision of the common good: "The future will require us to build better places," Kunstler says, "or the future will belong to other people in other societies."
