= List of Korean flags =

This is a list of flags used by South Korea, North Korea, and their predecessor states.

== Korean reunification flag ==
Flag	Date	Use	Description
	1991–present	Korean Unification Flag	Used to represent the whole of Korea when North and South participate together in international sporting events.

== National flags ==
Flag	Date	Use	Description
Present national flags
	2026–present	Flag of the Democratic People's Republic of Korea (Ramhongsaek Konghwagukki)	Red field with a blue bar on the top and bottom separated by a thin white stripe, the red field charged near the hoist with a white disc with a red star in the center. Current, 2026 standard shown.
	2011–present	Flag of the Republic of Korea (Taegeukgi)	White field with a red and blue taegeuk in the center and four black trigrams, one in each corner of the flag. Modified several times since its original adoption in 1948. Current, 2011 version shown.
Historical versions
	Extant 1392	A royal flag from the Goryeo dynasty	Also known as the "Bong-gi", which means "The Phoenix Flag".
	Extant 1392	A royal banner from the Goryeo dynasty.	Also known as the "Haema-gi", which means "The Seahorse Flag".
	Extant 1392	A royal banner from the Goryeo dynasty.	Also known as the "Sang-gi", which means "The Elephant Flag".
	Extant 1876	The personal standard of the King of Joseon	
	1882–1907	Royal standard of the Joseon dynasty	
	1897–1907	Imperial standard of the Korean Empire	
	1908–1910	Imperial standard of the Korean Empire	
	1908–1910	Standard of emperor emeritus of the Korean Empire	
	1908–1910	Standard of empress of the Korean Empire	
	1908–1910	Standard of crown prince of the Korean Empire	
	1908–1910	Standard of crown princess of the Korean Empire	
	1908–1910	Standard of prince of the Korean Empire	
	1882–1910	*Flag of the Joseon dynasty and Korean Empire The first version from top is depicted in the 1882 U.S. Navy book Flags of Maritime Nations. The third version from the top is a replica of the one given by emperor Gojong to American diplomat Owen N. Denny (1838–1900), who served as his advisor. The second version from the bottom is depicted in the 1899 U.S. Navy book Flags of Maritime Nations. Lowest is the version found in the 1944 United States postage stamp series.	The former Korean imperial flag had a different taegeuk from that in the current South Korean flag. Note that the 1882 U.S. Navy depiction may be left-right reversed. The arrangement of the trigrams was not officially fixed until an ordinance of 1949, when the South Korean government issued the construction.
	1919–1945	The flag of the Provisional Government of the Republic of Korea	In exile in several cities of China
	1945–1946	Flag of the People's Republic of Korea	A white rectangular background with three red horizontal strips throughout middle, and a red and blue taegeuk with white border near hoist side. Used by the People's Committees in the postwar Korea.
	1945–1948	Flag of the United States Army Military Government in Korea	A white rectangular background, a red and blue taegeuk in the center that symbolizes harmony, and four black trigrams, on each corner of the flag.
	1946–1948	Flag of the Provisional People's Committee of North Korea / People's Committee of North Korea	A white rectangular background, a red and blue taegeuk in the center that symbolizes harmony, and four black trigrams, on each corner of the flag.
	1948–1992	Flag of the Democratic People's Republic of Korea	Red field with a blue bar on the top and bottom separated by a thin white stripe, the red field charged near the hoist with a white disc with a red star in the center.
	15 August 1948 – 14 October 1949	Civil and state flag and ensign of the First Republic of Korea.	This flag was designed by the first National Assembly.
	15 October 1949 – 20 February 1984	Civil and state flag and ensign of the First, Second, Third, Fourth and the Fifth Republic of Korea.	The construction sheet was specified by the Ministry of Education and Culture in October 1949.
	21 February 1984 – 14 October 1997	Civil and state flag and ensign of the Fifth and Sixth Republic of Korea.	The construction sheet was specified by the Ministry of Education and Culture in October 1949.
	22 October 1992 – 22 March 2026	Flag of the Democratic People's Republic of Korea	Red field with a blue bar on the top and bottom separated by a thin white stripe, the red field charged near the hoist with a white disc with a red star in the center.
	15 October 1997 – 29 May 2011	Civil and state flag and ensign of the Sixth Republic of Korea.	The exact colors were specified via presidential decree in October 1997.

== Governmental flags ==
=== North Korea ===
Flag	Date	Use	Description
Standard of the President of the State Affairs Commission
	2018–present	Car flag of the President of the State Affairs Commission	Emblem of the President of the State Affairs Commission on a dark red field.
Flag of the National Government
	2023–present	Flag of the Ministry of National Defence	Red flag with the emblem of the Korean People's Army that defaced with the emblem of North Korea
	2023–present	Flag of the Ministry of Social Security, also flag of the Social Security Forces	Top portion in dark green and a narrow gold stripe, middle in black with two rectangles bearing two black oblique stripes on both hoist and fly, bottom in dark green and a narrow gold stripe, superimposed with the emblem of the ministry. The slogan reads "Protect the political security of the socialist motherland and the happiness of the People!" (사회주의조국의 정치적안전과 인민의 행북을 보위하여)
	2023–present	Flag of the Ministry of State Security	Bicolour of black and gold with 5 alternating stripes between the large stripes and additional black stripe with the emblem of the ministry in the middle. The slogan reads "For the firm security of the party and the country, and the victory of the great achievements of the Juche Revolution! (당과 국가의 굳건한 안전과 주체혁명위업의 승리를 위하여)"

=== South Korea ===
Flag	Date	Use	Description
Presidential standard
	1967–present (design update in 2020)	Presidential Standard	Two Phoenix taking golden Hibiscus syriacus under their wings.
Standard of the prime minister
	1988–present	Standard of the prime minister	Golden Hibiscus syriacus inlaid in symbolic Hibiscus syriacus insignia
Flag of the National Government
	1988–2016	Flag of the National Government	Symbolic Hibiscus syriacus insignia, inlaid with the word 정부 ("Government").
	2016–present	Flag of the National Government	Symbolic Taeguk insignia, with wordmark in Korean 대한민국정부 ("Government of the Republic of Korea").
	2013–2022; 2025–present	Flag of the Blue House	Insignia of the Blue House with wordmark in Korean 대한민국 청와대 ("Cheong Wa Dae of the Republic of Korea")
	2005–present	Flag of the South Korean national police agency.	Insignia of the South Korean National Police, with the words 경찰청 ("Police Agency")
	2005–present	Flag of the South Korean coast guard	Insignia of the South Korean coast guard, with the words 해양경찰청 ("Maritime Police Agency")
	2004–present	Flag of the South Korean Supreme Prosecutors' Office	Insignia of the Supreme Prosecutors' Office, with the words 검찰 / Prosecution Service
	2022–present	Flag of the Corruption Investigation Office for High-ranking Officials	Insignia of the Corruption Investigation Office for High-ranking Officials, with the words 고위공직자범죄수사처 ("Corruption Investigation Office for High-ranking Officials")
Flag of the Committee for the Five Northern Korean Provinces
	1949–2016	Flag of the Committee for the Five Northern Korean Provinces	White flag with a Hibiscus syriacus superimposed by a blue north pointer
	2016–present	Flag of the Committee for the Five Northern Korean Provinces	Symbolic Taeguk insignia, with grey words 이북5도위원회 ("Committee for the Five Northern [Korean] Provinces")
Flag of the Korean Central Intelligence Agency
	?–1981	Flag of the Korean Central Intelligence Agency	White trapezoid on blue background with orange emblem

== Military flags ==
=== Korea ===
Flag	Date	Use	Description
	4th century	Military Flag of Goguryeo	A banner with a simple orange field.
	Mid 5th Century	Military Flag of Goguryeo	A black 4-pointed banner with 3 white stripes.
	Late 5th Century	Military Flag of Goguryeo	A red swallowtail banner with a yellow stripe.
		Military flag of Baekje	A banner with a simple yellow field.
		Military flag of Silla	A banner with a blue field with a white crescent moon in the center.
		Flag of the commander of Joseon	A banner with Nakseo magic square.
		Flag of the commander Eo Jae-yeon	As one of the military flags of the Joseon Dynasty, it is called Sujagi (帥字旗) or Sugi (帥旗). During the Joseon Dynasty, it was hung as a mark of the general in the military camp. As for the shape, the word for "command" (帥) is engraved in black letters on the pressed color, and some have a dream (decoration of the flag) around the flag.
	1930s	Military flag of anti-Japanese partisans	Red field with golden word "Anti-Japanese People's Guerilla Troop" (반일인민유객대). Revived as ceremonial unit color for historical units in North Korea beginning 2015.

=== North Korea ===
Flag	Date	Use	Description
	1996–2002	Flag of the Supreme Commander of the Korean People's Army	
	2002–2022	Flag of the Supreme Commander of the Korean People's Army	The Supreme Commander Star on a red flag. Sometimes used as a war flag during military exercises.
	1948	Flag of the Korean People's Army	Initially designed in 1948 with the early draft for the Emblem of North Korea in 1948. The slogan reads: "For the independence of the motherland and the people" (조국의 독립과 인민을 위하여). Used only as ceremonial unit color for historical units beginning 2013.
	1948	Flag of the Korean People's Army	With a red star with golden border and bearing a hammer and two sickles. The inspection reads: "Korean People's Army / [Unit number] / 1st (as in ceremonies) Defensive Division" (조선인민군 제1국방사단). Revived as ceremonial unit color for historical units beginning 2015.
	1948–1961	Flag of the Korean People's Army	Used only as ceremonial unit color for historical units beginning 2013.
	1948–1961	Flag of the Korean People's Army	Used for Guards units only. The slogan on obverse side reads: "For the motherland's freedom and independence" (조국의 자유와 독립을 위하여). The reverse side have a Guards badge with Korean letters reading "[Unit number] / Guards Kang Kon 2nd (as in ceremonies) Infantry Division" (근위강건제2부병사단). Revived as ceremonial unit color for Guards units beginning 2013.
	1961–1992	Flag of the Korean People's Army	Latest version shown; emblem adopted in 1992. The slogan reads: "For the unification and independence of the motherland, and the freedom and happiness of the people" (조국의 통일, 독립과 인민의 자유와 행복을 위하여).
	1992–1993	Flag of the Korean People's Army	Emblem of DPRK updated to the one featuring Mount Paektu.
	1961–1993 (reverse)	Flag of the Korean People's Army	With a red star with golden border and bearing a hammer and two sickles.
	1993–2023	Flag of the General Staff of the Korean People's Army	Seen used during the October 1995 parade, observed very rarely.
	2023–present	Flag of the General Staff of the Korean People's Army	Red flag with the emblem of the KPA is defaced with the emblem of the DPRK emblazoned on largened red star. The slogan reads "For the endless prosperity of the fatherland and the security of the people! (조국의 무궁한 번영과 인민의 안녕을 위하여)", with the date of the founding of the KPA as 2 February 1948 in the canton.
	2023–present	Flag of the General Staff of the Korean People's Army	A design containing the façade of the WPK headquarters in Pyongyang, a red shield bearing the emblem of WPK, and two swords.
	1993–2023	Flag of the People's Army Ground Force	Emblem of KPA with slogan: "For the unification and independence of the motherland, and the freedom and happiness of the people" (조국의 통일, 독립과 인민의 자유와 행복을 위하여). Until the death of Kim Il Sung, version with the slogan "Let us defend the Party's Central Committee headed by dear Comrade Kim Il Sung with our lives!" (경애하는 김일성동지를 수반으로 하는 당중앙위원회를 목숨으로 사수하자!) was also used. When Kim Jong Il was in power, the slogan used between 1997 and 2011 was: "Let us defend the headquarters of the revolution headed by the great Comrade Kim Jong Il with our lives!" (위대한 김정일동지를 수반으로 하는 혁명의 수뇌부를 목숨으로 사수하자!). Until the flag replacement in 2023, the slogan "Let us defend the Party's Central Committee headed by the great Comrade Kim Jong Un with our lives!" (위대한 김정은동지를 수반으로 하는 당중앙위원회를 목숨으로 사수하자!) was also used. The 4.25 commemorates the foundation of People's Anti-Japanese Guerrilla Army on April 25, 1932. Also used since 2020 by the Special Operations, Strategic Forces and Social Security Forces as branch and unit colours. Continually used as ceremonial unit color for historical units as of 2025.
	1993–2023	Reverse side of the flag of the Korean People's Army Ground Force.	With Korean letters reading "Revolutionary armed forces of the Workers' Party of Korea, Korean People's Army [unit name] / No.425 unit (in ceremonies)" (조선로동당의 혁명적무장력인 조선인민군 제425 군부대). The number 425 commemorates the foundation of People's Anti-Japanese Guerrilla Army on April 25, 1932.
	2023–present	Flag of the People's Army Ground Force	Identical to the former flag except the emblem of the KPA is defaced with the emblem of the DPRK emblazoned on largened red star, and accomplished by acanthus leaves. The slogan reads "For the endless prosperity of the fatherland and the security of the people! (조국의 무궁한 번영과 인민의 안녕을 위하여)", with the date of founding of the particular unit placed in the canton. This flag is used by units of the Ground Forces to serve as a unit flag. The date of foundation on the canton differs among KPAGF units of regiment/brigade level and above, independent battalions and educational institutions.
	2023–present	Reverse side of the flag of the Korean People's Army Ground Force.	Identical to the former flag except the party symbol is placed within a design containing the facade of the WPK headquarters in Pyongyang, a red shield bearing the emblem of WPK, and two swords. The slogan reads "Let us defend the Party's Central Committee headed by Dear Comrade Kim Jong Un with our lives!" (경애하는 김정은동지를 수반으로 하는 당중앙위원회를 목숨으로 사수하자!)
	1993–2023	Flag of the People's Navy	Emblem of KPA with anchor. The slogan reads: "For the unification and independence of the motherland, and the freedom and happiness of the people" (조국의 통일, 독립과 인민의 자유와 행복을 위하여). Until the death of Kim Il Sung, version with the slogan "Let us defend the Party's Central Committee headed by dear Comrade Kim Il Sung with our lives!" (경애하는 김일성동지를 수반으로 하는 당중앙위원회를 목숨으로 사수하자!) was also used. When Kim Jong Il was in power, the slogan used between 1997 and 2011 was: "Let us defend the headquarters of the revolution headed by the great Comrade Kim Jong Il with our lives!" (위대한 김정일동지를 수반으로 하는 혁명의 수뇌부를 목숨으로 사수하자!). Until the flag replacement in 2023, the slogan "Let us defend the Party's Central Committee headed by the great Comrade Kim Jong Un with our lives!" (위대한 김정은동지를 수반으로 하는 당중앙위원회를 목숨으로 사수하자!) was also used. The 4.25 commemorates the foundation of People's Anti-Japanese Guerrilla Army on April 25, 1932. Continually used as ceremonial unit color for historical units as of 2025.
	1993–2023	Reverse side of the flag of the flag of Korean People's Navy.	With Korean letters reading "Revolutionary armed forces of the Workers' Party of Korea, Korean People's Army [unit name] / No.415 unit (in ceremonies)" (조선로동당의 혁명적무장력인 조선인민군 제415 군부대). The number 415 commemorates the birthday of Kim Il-Sung on April 15.
Small vexillological symbol or pictogram in black and white showing the different uses of the flag	2023–present	Flag of the People's Navy	Identical to the former flag except the emblem of the KPA is defaced with the emblem of the DPRK emblazoned on largened red star, surrounded by a laurel wreath, and surmounted by an anchor and steering wheel. The slogan reads "For the endless prosperity of the fatherland and the stabling of the people! (조국의 무궁한 번영과 인민의 안녕을 위하여)", with the date of founding of the particular unit placed in the canton. The representative flag of the whole branch displays the date 28 August 1949.
Small vexillological symbol or pictogram in black and white showing the different uses of the flag	2023–present	Reverse side of the flag of the flag of Korean People's Navy.	Identical to the former flag except the party symbol is placed within a design containing the façade of the WPK headquarters in Pyongyang, an anchor, and a red shield bearing the emblem of WPK. The slogan reads "Let us defend the Party's Central Committee headed by Dear Comrade Kim Jong Un with our lives!" (경애하는 김정은동지를 수반으로 하는 당중앙위원회를 목숨으로 사수하자!)
	1990s–present	Naval ensign of North Korea	Red flag with Paektu Mountain in rays in a disc with national color outlines and a red star.
	1990s–present	Naval Ensign of North Korea for Guards Units	
	1990s–present	Naval Jack of North Korea	
	1993–2023, (insignia updated in 2012)	Flag of the Korean People's Army Air and Anti-Air Force	Emblem of KPA with wings. The slogan reads: "For the unification and independence of the motherland, and the freedom and happiness of the people" (조국의 통일, 독립과 인민의 자유와 행복을 위하여). Until the death of Kim Il Sung, version with the slogan "Let us defend the Party's Central Committee headed by dear Comrade Kim Il Sung with our lives!" (경애하는 김일성동지를 수반으로 하는 당중앙위원회를 목숨으로 사수하자!) was also used. When Kim Jong Il was in power, the slogan used between 1997 and 2011 was: "Let us defend the headquarters of the revolution headed by the great Comrade Kim Jong Il with our lives!" (위대한 김정일동지를 수반으로 하는 혁명의 수뇌부를 목숨으로 사수하자!). Until the flag replacement in 2023, the slogan "Let us defend the Party's Central Committee headed by the great Comrade Kim Jong Un with our lives!" (위대한 김정은동지를 수반으로 하는 당중앙위원회를 목숨으로 사수하자!) was also used. The 4.25 commemorates the foundation of People's Anti-Japanese Guerrilla Army on April 25, 1932. Continually used as ceremonial unit color for historical units as of 2025.
	1993–2023	Reverse side of the flag of the Korean People's Army Air and Anti-Air Force.	With Korean letters reading "Revolutionary armed forces of the Workers' Party of Korea, Korean People's Army [unit name] / No.216 unit (in ceremonies)" (조선로동당의 혁명적무장력인 조선인민군 제216 군부대). The number 216 commemorates the birthday of Kim Jong-Il on February 16.
	2023–present	Flag of the Korean People's Army Air Force	Identical to the former flag except the emblem of the KPAAF is defaced with the emblem of the DPRK emblazoned on largened red star with additional stars at the top. Lower stripes are arranged as chevrons, and with six trailing jet fighters emerging behind the emblem. The slogan reads "For the endless prosperity of the fatherland and the security of the people! (조국의 무궁한 번영과 인민의 안녕을 위하여)", with the date of founding of the particular unit placed in the canton. The representative flag of the whole branch displays the date 29 November 1945.
	2023–present	Reverse side of the flag of the Korean People's Army Air Force.	Identical to the former flag except the party symbol is placed within a design containing the façade of the WPK headquarters in Pyongyang, a red shield bearing the emblem of WPK, and an eagle. The slogan reads "Let us defend the Party's Central Committee headed by Dear Comrade Kim Jong Un with our lives!" (경애하는 김정은동지를 수반으로 하는 당중앙위원회를 목숨으로 사수하자!)
Small vexillological symbol or pictogram in black and white showing the different uses of the flag	2018–2020	Flag of the Strategic Force	Emblem of KPA on an upper half globe
Small vexillological symbol or pictogram in black and white showing the different uses of the flag	2018–2020	Flag of the Strategic Force	With Korean letters reading "Revolutionary armed forces of the Workers' Party of Korea, Korean People's Army [unit name] / No.108 unit (in ceremonies)" (조선로동당의 혁명적무장력인 조선인민군 제108 군부대). The number 108 commemorates the birthday of Kim Jong-Un on January 8.
Small vexillological symbol or pictogram in black and white showing the different uses of the flag	2023–present	Flag of the Strategic Force	With the same pattern as army flag but has the date 3 July 1999 on obverse side.
Small vexillological symbol or pictogram in black and white showing the different uses of the flag	2023–present	Flag of the Strategic Force	With the same pattern as army flag but has the date 3 July 1999 on obverse side.
	2023–present	Flag of the Missile Administration	The Flag of the Missile Administration is seen with its Emblem in a large form with the founding date of 2016.4.30, The slogan reads "For the defense of the Democratic People's Republic of Korea and the security of its people! (조선민주주의인민공화국의 안전과 인민의 안녕을 위하여)"
	2023–present	Flag of the Missile Administration	Identical to the Backside flags of the KPA except the party symbol is placed within a design containing the façade of the WPK headquarters in Pyongyang
Small vexillological symbol or pictogram in black and white showing the different uses of the flag	2018–2020	Flag of the Special Operation Force	Emblem of KPA with the Big Dipper.
Small vexillological symbol or pictogram in black and white showing the different uses of the flag	2018–2020	Flag of the Special Operation Force	With Korean letters reading "Revolutionary armed forces of the Workers' Party of Korea, Korean People's Army [unit name]". / No.506 unit (in ceremonies)" (조선로동당의 혁명적무장력인 조선인민군 제506 군부대). The number 506 commemorates the 7th Congress of the Workers' Party of Korea on May 6, 2016.
Small vexillological symbol or pictogram in black and white showing the different uses of the flag	2023–Present	Flag of the Special Operation Force	With the same pattern as army flag but has the date 7 February 1969 on obverse side.
Small vexillological symbol or pictogram in black and white showing the different uses of the flag	2023–Present	Flag of the Special Operation Force	With the same pattern as army flag but has the date 7 February 1969 on obverse side.
Small vexillological symbol or pictogram in black and white showing the different uses of the flag	2007–2023	Flag of the Worker-Peasant Red Guards	Slogan used until 2012, since then the flag shares the same motto as the rest of the KPA.
Small vexillological symbol or pictogram in black and white showing the different uses of the flag	2007–2023	Flag of the Worker-Peasant Red Guards	With Korean letters reading "Worker-Peasant Red Guards".
Small vexillological symbol or pictogram in black and white showing the different uses of the flag	2023–Present	Flag of the Worker-Peasant Red Guards	The slogan reads "For the endless prosperity of the fatherland and the security of the people! (조국의 무궁한 번영과 인민의 안녕을 위하여)"
Small vexillological symbol or pictogram in black and white showing the different uses of the flag	2023–Present	Flag of the Worker-Peasant Red Guards	With Korean letters reading "Worker-Peasant Red Guards".

=== South Korea ===
Flag	Date	Use	Description
	1948–present	Flag of the Armed Forces	Insignia of the armed forces on a red field.
	?–present	Flag of the Minister of National Defense	Insignia of the armed forces and four stars on a red field.
	?–present	Flag of the Vice Minister of National Defense	Insignia of the armed forces and four stars on a blue field.
	?–present	Flag of the Joint Chiefs of Staff	Crimson flag with the insignia of the JCS and the words 합동참모본부.
	?–present	Flag of the Chairman of the Joint Chiefs of Staff	Insignia of the Chairman of the Joint Chiefs of Staff on a crimson field.
	1946–present	Flag of the Army	Insignia of the army on a field parted per fess; above is white, below is blue.
	?–present	Flag of the Chief of Staff of the Army	Insignia of the Chief of Staff and four stars on a red field.
	?–present	Flag of the Daejang	Four stars and a Hibiscus syriacus on a red field.
	?–present	Flag of the Jungjang	Three stars and a Hibiscus syriacus on a red field.
	?–present	Flag of the Sojang	Two stars and a Hibiscus syriacus on a red field.
	?–present	Flag of the Junjang	A star and a Hibiscus syriacus on a red field.
	1955–present	Naval ensign, navy flag, and naval jack	Taegeuk on crossed anchors in a white canton on a blue field
	?–present	Flag of the Chief of Naval Operations	Insignia of the Chief of Naval Operations and four stars on a blue field
	?–present	Flag of the Daejang	Four stars and a Hibiscus syriacus on a blue field.
	?–present	Flag of the Jungjang	Three stars and a Hibiscus syriacus on a blue field.
	?–present	Flag of the Sojang	Two stars and a Hibiscus syriacus on a blue field.
	?–present	Flag of the Junjang	A star and a Hibiscus syriacus on a blue field.
	1952–present	Flag of the Marine Corps	The similarity with the flag of the United States Marine Corps shows the strong influence of the United States since the creation of South Korean armed forces.
	?–present	Flag of the Commandant of the Marine Corps	Three stars above the insignia of the Marine Corps on a red field.
	?–present	Flag of the Jungjang	Three stars and a Hibiscus syriacus on a red field.
	?–present	Flag of the Sojang	Two stars and a Hibiscus syriacus on a red field.
	?–present	Flag of the Junjang	A star and a Hibiscus syriacus on a red field.
	1952–present	Flag of the Air Force	Insignia of the air force on a sky blue field.
	?–present	Flag of the Chief of Staff of the Air Force	Insignia of the Chief of Staff and four stars on a sky blue field.
	?–present	Flag of the Daejang	Four stars and a Hibiscus syriacus on a sky blue field.
	?–present	Flag of the Jungjang	Three stars and a Hibiscus syriacus on a sky blue field.
	?–present	Flag of the Sojang	Two stars and a Hibiscus syriacus on a sky blue field.
	?–present	Flag of the Junjang	A star and a Hibiscus syriacus on a sky blue field.
	1975–2023	Flag of the Republic of Korea Civil Defense Corps	Insignia of the Civil Defense Corps on a white field.
	2023–present	Flag of the Republic of Korea Civil Defense Corps	Insignia of the Civil Defense Corps on a white field.
	1968–present	Flag of the Republic of Korea Reserve Forces	Insignia of the Reserve Forces on a blue field.

== Political flags ==
Flag	Date	Party	Description
	1935–1947	Korean National Revolutionary Party	
	1909–1940s	Korean National Association	Red flag with yellow canton bearing red-blue taegeuk.
	1913–current	Young Korean Academy	
	1946–1949	Flag of the Workers' Party of North Korea	
	1946–1949	Flag of the Workers' Party of South Korea	
	1949–present	Flag of the Workers' Party of Korea	Combination of a hammer (workers), a writing brush (intellectuals) and a Korean sickle (peasants), crossed over a red field.
	1946–present	Flag of the Socialist Patriotic Youth League	Emblem of Youth League on a red flag, with "Youth" (청년) on the emblem.
	1945–present	Flag of the Socialist Women's Union of Korea	Red-white-red flag with the name of the organization: "Women's League" (녀성동맹).
	1955–present	Flag of the Korean Youth League in Japan	Tricolor flag with the League's logo.
	1994?–present	Flag of Mindan	Sky blue flag with a Taegeuk surrounding by five petals of hibiscus syriacus. The formal name of the society (Zainihon Daikanminkoku Mindan) is written in kanji in white, and the abbreviation (Mindan) is written in hangul in yellow.
	2024–present	Flag of the Democratic Party of Korea	Blue flag with the party emblem in the middle.
	2020–present	Flag of the People Power Party	White flag with the party emblem in the middle.
	2020–present	Flag of the People Power Party	Red flag with the party emblem in the middle.

== See also ==
- List of North Korean flags
- List of South Korean flags
