= List of South Korean flags =

This is a list of flags used in South Korea, from 1945 to the present.

== National flags ==
Flag	Date	Use	Description
	1945–1948	Civil and state flag and ensign of the United States Army Military Government in Korea	A white rectangular background, a red and blue taegeuk in the center that symbolizes harmony, and four black trigrams, one on each corner of the flag.
	15 August 1948 – 14 October 1949	Civil and state flag and ensign of the First Republic of Korea.	This flag was designed by the first National Assembly.
	15 October 1949 – 20 February 1984	Civil and state flag and ensign of the First, Second, Third, Fourth and the Fifth Republic of Korea.	This flag was standardized by the National Flag Correction Committee, and announced by the Ministry of Education and Culture on 15 October 1949. The exact colors were not specified.
	21 February 1984 – 14 October 1997	Civil and state flag and ensign of the Fifth and Sixth Republic of Korea.	On 21 February 1984, with the enactment of regulations on the South Korean flag, the South Korean government re-designated the colors. The exact color was not specified.
	15 October 1997 – 29 May 2011	Civil and state flag and ensign of the Sixth Republic of Korea.	On 15 October 1997, the South Korean government officially specified the exact colors to be used on the flag via presidential decree.
	30 May 2011 – present	Civil and state flag and ensign of South Korea.	On 30 May 2011, the South Korean government re-specified the colors.

== National government flags ==
Flag	Date	Use	Description
	1967–present (design update in 2020)	Presidential standard	Two fenghuang over a golden Hibiscus syriacus
	2022–2025	Flag of the Presidential Office	Insignia of the Presidential Office with wordmark in Korean 대한민국 대통령실 ("Presidential Office of the Republic of Korea")
	2025	Flag of the Presidential Office	Insignia of the Presidential Office with wordmark in Korean 대한민국 대통령실 ("Presidential Office of the Republic of Korea"), with the revived Blue House insignia
	2013–2022; 2025–present	Flag of the Blue House	Insignia of the Blue House with wordmark in Korean 대한민국 청와대 ("Cheong Wa Dae of the Republic of Korea")
	1988–present	Standard of the prime minister	Golden Hibiscus syriacus inlaid in white symbolic Hibiscus syriacus insignia
	1949 (original) – 1988 (design update) – March 2016	Flag of the national government	Symbolic Hibiscus syriacus insignia, inlaid with the word 정부 ("Government").
	March 2016 – present	Flag of the national government	Symbolic Taeguk insignia, with wordmark 대한민국정부 ("Government of the Republic of Korea").
	2005–present	Flag of the South Korean national police agency	Insignia of the South Korean National Police, with the words 경찰청 ("Police Agency")
	2005–present	Flag of the South Korean coast guard	Insignia of the South Korean coast guard, with the words 해양경찰청 ("Maritime Police Agency")
	2004–present	Flag of the South Korean Supreme Prosecutors' Office	Insignia of the Supreme Prosecutors' Office, with the words 검찰 / "Prosecution Service"
	2022–present	Flag of the Corruption Investigation Office for High-ranking Officials	Insignia of the Corruption Investigation Office for High-ranking Officials, with the words 고위공직자범죄수사처 ("Corruption Investigation Office for High-ranking Officials")
	?–2018	Flag of the National Election Commission	Symbolic Hibiscus syriacus insignia, inlaid with the character 選
	2018–present	Flag of the National Election Commission	Symbolic Hibiscus syriacus insignia, inlaid with word 선거
	1998–present	Flag of the Board of Audit and Inspection	Insignia of the Board of Audit and Inspection with the word 감사원
	2001–present	Flag of the National Human Rights Commission	Insignia of the NHRCK with the word 국가인권위원회
	1949–2016	Flag of the Committee for the Five Northern Korean Provinces	White flag with a Hibiscus syriacus superimposed by a blue north pointer
	2016–present	Flag of the Committee for the Five Northern Korean Provinces	Symbolic Taeguk insignia, with grey words 이북5도위원회 ("Committee for the Five Northern [Korean] Provinces")

== Military flags ==
Flag	Date	Use	Description
	1948–present	Flag of the Armed Forces	Insignia of the armed forces on a red field.
	?–present	Flag of the Minister of National Defense	Insignia of the armed forces and four stars on a red field.
	?–present	Flag of the Vice Minister of National Defense	Insignia of the armed forces and four stars on a blue field.
	?–present	Flag of the Joint Chiefs of Staff	Crimson flag with the insignia of the JCS and the words 합동참모본부.
	?–present	Flag of the Chairman of the Joint Chiefs of Staff	Insignia of the Chairman of the Joint Chiefs of Staff on a crimson field.
	1946–present	Flag of the Army	Insignia of the army on a field parted per fess (a horizontal bicolor); above is white, below is blue.
	?–present	Flag of the Chief of Staff of the Army	Insignia of the Chief of Staff and four stars on a red field.
	?–present	Flag of the Daejang	Four stars and a Hibiscus syriacus on a red field.
	?–present	Flag of the Jungjang	Three stars and a Hibiscus syriacus on a red field.
	?–present	Flag of the Sojang	Two stars and a Hibiscus syriacus on a red field.
	?–present	Flag of the Junjang	A star and a Hibiscus syriacus on a red field.
	1955–present	Naval ensign, navy flag, and naval jack	Taegeuk on crossed anchors in a white canton on a blue field.
	?–present	Flag of the Chief of Naval Operations	Insignia of the Chief of Naval Operations and four stars on a blue field.
	?–present	Flag of the Daejang	Four stars and a Hibiscus syriacus on a blue field.
	?–present	Flag of the Jungjang	Three stars and a Hibiscus syriacus on a blue field.
	?–present	Flag of the Sojang	Two stars and a Hibiscus syriacus on a blue field.
	?–present	Flag of the Junjang	A star and a Hibiscus syriacus on a blue field.
	1952–present	Flag of the Marine Corps	The similarity with the flag of the United States Marine Corps shows the strong influence of the United States since the creation of South Korean armed forces.
	?–present	Flag of the Commandant of the Marine Corps	Three stars above the insignia of the Marine Corps on a red field.
	?–present	Flag of the Jungjang	Three stars and a Hibiscus syriacus on a red field.
	?–present	Flag of the Sojang	Two stars and a Hibiscus syriacus on a red field.
	?–present	Flag of the Junjang	A star and a Hibiscus syriacus on a red field.
	1952–present	Flag of the Air Force	Insignia of the air force on a sky blue field.
	?–present	Flag of the Chief of Staff of the Air Force	Insignia of the Chief of Staff and four stars on a sky blue field.
	?–present	Flag of the Daejang	Four stars and a Hibiscus syriacus on a sky blue field.
	?–present	Flag of the Jungjang	Three stars and a Hibiscus syriacus on a sky blue field.
	?–present	Flag of the Sojang	Two stars and a Hibiscus syriacus on a sky blue field.
	?–present	Flag of the Junjang	A star and a Hibiscus syriacus on a sky blue field.
	1975–2023	Flag of the Republic of Korea Civil Defense Corps	Insignia of the Civil Defense Corps on a white field.
	2023–present	Flag of the Republic of Korea Civil Defense Corps	Insignia of the Civil Defense Corps on a white field.
	1968–present	Flag of the Republic of Korea Reserve Forces	Insignia of the Reserve Forces on a blue field.

== Flags of legislatures ==
Flag	Date	Use	Description
	1948–2014	Flag of the National Assembly	
	2014–present	Flag of the National Assembly	
	1991–2014	Flag of regional councils	
	2014–present	Flag of regional councils	

== Flags of judiciaries ==
Flag	Date	Use	Description
	1978–present	Flag of South Korean courts	Dark blue flag with the emblem of South Korean courts in the center.
	1988–2017	Flag of the Constitutional Court of Korea	Dark blue flag with the emblem of the Constitutional Court of Korea in the center.
	2017–present	Flag of the Constitutional Court of Korea	Dark blue flag with the emblem of the Constitutional Court of Korea in the center.

== Flags of subdivisions ==
=== Provincial-level division flags ===
Flag	Date	Use	Geocode
	1996–present	Flag of Seoul	KR-11
	2012–present	Flag of Sejong City	KR-50
	2023–present	Flag of Busan	KR-26
	2001–present	Flag of Daegu	KR-27
	1996–present	Flag of Incheon	KR-28
	2000–present	Flag of Gwangju	KR-29
	1995–present	Flag of Daejeon	KR-30
	1997–present	Flag of Ulsan	KR-31
	2021–present	Flag of Gyeonggi Province	KR-41
	2023–present	Flag of Gangwon State	KR-42
	2023–present	Flag of North Chungcheong Province	KR-43
	2012–present	Flag of South Chungcheong Province	KR-44
	2024–present	Flag of Jeonbuk State	KR-45
	2016–present	Flag of South Jeolla Province	KR-46
	1997–present	Flag of North Gyeongsang Province	KR-47
	1999–present	Flag of South Gyeongsang Province	KR-48
	2009–present	Flag of Jeju Special Self-Governing Province	KR-49

=== North Korean provincial flags ===
As the South Korean government claims the territory of North Korea as its own, provincial flags also exist for the North Korean provinces that are claimed by South Korea. The following are flags of the five Korean provinces located entirely north of the Military Demarcation Line as according to the South Korean government, as it formally claims to be the sole legitimate government of the entire Korean Peninsula.

Flag	Name	Geocode	Description
	North Hamgyeong Province	– (KP-09)	Flag with the emblem depicting Mount Baekdu and surrounded by Hibiscus syriacus.
	South Hamgyeong Province	– (KP-08)	White symbolic Hibiscus syriacus insignia, inlaid with the word 함남 (abbreviation for South Hamgyeong Province).
	Hwanghae Province	– (KP-05 and KP-06)	Symbolic Hibiscus syriacus insignia, inlaid with the character 黄.
	North Pyeongan Province	– (KP-03)	Symbolic Taeguk insignia, with the word 평안북도 ("North Pyeongan Province").
	South Pyeongan Province	– (KP-02)	A cogwheel with a delta symbol representing north.

=== Flags of other cities ===
Andong

Ansan

Anseong

Anyang

Asan

Boryeong

Bucheon

Changwon

Cheonan

Cheongju

Chuncheon

Chungju

Dangjin

Dongducheon

Donghae

Gangneung

Geoje

Gimcheon

Gimhae

Gimje

Gimpo

Gongju

Goyang

Gumi

Gunpo

Gunsan

Guri

Gwacheon

Gwangju, Gyeonggi

Gwangmyeong

Gwangyang

Gyeongju

Gyeongsan

Gyeryong

Hanam

Hwaseong

Icheon

Iksan

Jecheon

Jeongeup

Jeonju

Jinju

Naju

Namyangju

Namwon

Nonsan

Miryang

Mokpo

Mungyeong

Osan

Paju

Pocheon

Pohang

Pyeongtaek

Sacheon

Samcheok

Sangju

Seongnam

Seosan

Siheung

Sokcho

Suncheon

Suwon

Taebaek

Tongyeong

Uijeongbu

Uiwang

Wonju

Yangju

Yangsan

Yeoju

Yeongcheon

Yeongju

Yeosu

Yongin

=== Historical flags ===
Flag	Date	Use	Description
	1946–1996	Flag of Seoul	The circle in the center of the emblem represents a street and the octagonal symbol stands for the eight mountains surrounding Seoul.
	1962–1995	Flag of Busan	
	1995–2023	Flag of Busan	
	1977–1996	Flag of Daegu	The emblem was designed during the Japanese rule.
	1996–2001	Flag of Daegu	
	2001	Flag of Daegu	
	1972–1995	Flag of Daejeon	Before it was upgraded to a municipality in 1989, Daejeon was a city under the South Chungcheong Province's management.
	1977–1996	Flag of Incheon	
	1986–1988	Flag of Gwangju	
	1988–2000	Flag of Gwangju	
	1969–1998	Flag of North Chungcheong Province	
	1998–2023	Flag of North Chungcheong Province	
	1962–1998	Flag of South Chungcheong Province	
	1998–2012	Flag of South Chungcheong Province	
	1970–1997	Flag of Gangwon Province	
	1997–2023	Flag of Gangwon Province	
	1967–1996	Flag of Gyeonggi Province	
	1996–2006	Flag of Gyeonggi Province	
	2006–2021	Flag of Gyeonggi Province	
	1966–1997	Flag of North Gyeongsang Province	
	1974–1999	Flag of South Gyeongsang Province	
	1974–1999	Flag of South Gyeongsang Province (1987 version)	
	1969–1987	Flag of North Jeolla Province	
	1987–1991	Flag of North Jeolla Province	
	1991–1997	Flag of North Jeolla Province	
	1997–2009	Flag of North Jeolla Province	
	2009–2024	Flag of North Jeolla Province	
	1969–2000	Flag of South Jeolla Province	
	2000–2016	Flag of South Jeolla Province	
	1969–2009	Flag of Jeju Province	
	1949–2019	Flag of North Pyeongan Province, claimed by South Korea	

=== Historical flags of other cities ===
Jeju City (2000–2006)

Seogwipo (1981–2006)

Suwon (1999–2022)

Yeongcheon (1981–1995)

== Political flags ==
Flag	Date	Party	Description
Current
	2020–present	People Power Party	
	2024–present	Democratic Party of Korea	
	2024–present	Reform Party	
	2020–present	Minsaeng Party	
	2020–present	Women's Party	
	2014–present	Justice Party	
	2015–present	New National Participation Party	
Former
	2019–2020	New Conservative Party	
	2019–2020	New Conservative Party	
	2018–2020	Bareunmirae Party	
	2017–2020	Liberty Korea Party	
	2016–2022	Socialist Revolutionary Workers' Party	
	2016–2018	Bareun Party	
	1995–2006	United Liberal Democrats	
	1992–1994	Unification National Party	
	1995–1997	New Korea Party	
	1987–1990	Reunification Democratic Party	
	1985–1988	New Korean Democratic Party	
	1987–1990	Democratic Justice Party	
	1981–1987	Democratic Justice Party	
	1981–1988	Democratic Korea Party	
	1976–1979	South Korean National Liberation Front Preparation Committee	Modeled on the flag of North Korea and the flag of Viet Cong
	1967–1980	New Democratic Party	
	1949–1950s	Flag of Ilminism	
	1946–1959	Northwest Youth League	
	1946–1949	Korean National Youth Association	
	1946–1949	Workers' Party of South Korea	

== See also ==
- Flag of South Korea
- List of Korean flags
- Emblem of South Korea
- List of North Korean flags
