= List of North Korean flags =

This is a list of flags used in North Korea, from 1946 to the present.

== National flag ==
Flag	Date	Use	Description
	1946–1948	Flag of the Provisional People's Committee of North Korea / People's Committee of North Korea	A white rectangular background, a red and blue Taeguk in the center that symbolizes harmony, and four black trigrams, on each corner of the flag.
	1948–1992	Flag of the Democratic People's Republic of Korea	Red field with a blue bar on the top and bottom separated by a thin white stripe, the red field charged near the hoist with a white disc with a red star in the center.
	1992–2026	Flag of the Democratic People's Republic of Korea	Red field with a blue bar on the top and bottom separated by a thin white stripe, the red field charged near the hoist with a white disc with a red star in the center.
	2026–present	Flag of the Democratic People's Republic of Korea	Red field with a blue bar on the top and bottom separated by a thin white stripe, the red field charged near the hoist with a white disc with a red star in the center.

== Political flags ==
Flag	Date	Use	Description
President of the State Affairs of the DPRK
	2018–present	Car flag of the president of the State Affairs	Emblem of the president of the State Affairs on a red field. First seen during the First DPRK-US Summit in Singapore.
Workers' Party of Korea
	1946–1949	Flag of the Workers' Party of North Korea	
	1949–present	Flag of the Workers' Party of Korea	Combination of a hammer (workers), a writing brush (intellectuals) and a Korean sickle (peasants), crossed over a red field.
Social Organs of the Workers' Party of Korea
	Unknown	Flag of the Korean Children's Union	Emplem of the Korean Children's Union on a red flag, with text on the top and bottom. The text written on top is "For the Socialist Fatherland, Always Prepared!" (사회주의조국을 위하여 항상 준비하자!), and the text on the bottom is "Korean Children's Union" (조선소년단).
	1964-1996	Flag of the League of Socialist Working Youth of Korea	Emblem of Youth League on a red flag, with "Socialist Working Youth" (사로청) on the emblem.
	1946–present	Flag of the Socialist Patriotic Youth League	Emblem of Youth League on a red flag, with "Youth" (청년) on the emblem.
	2021–present	Flag of the Socialist Patriotic Youth League	Emblem of Youth League on a red flag, with text on the top and sides, and a golden wreath of barley on the bottom. The text written on top is "Socialist Patriotic Youth League" (사회주의애국청년동맹), and the text on the left and right say "Youth Vanguard" (청년 전위). This flag commemorates the name change from the Kimilsungist-Kimjongilist Youth League to their current name.
	Unknown	Flag of the Youth Shock Brigades	The text "Vanguard of the party members" on a red flag with Mount Paektu in the canton.
	1945–present	Flag of the Socialist Women's Union of Korea	Flag with the name of the organization: "Women's League" (녀성동맹).
	1955–present	Flag of the Korean Youth League in Japan	Tricolor flag with the League's logo.
Other parties
	1945–present	Flag of the Korean Social Democratic Party	
	1946–present	Flag of the Chondoist Chongu Party	

== Military flags ==
Flag	Notes	Use	Description
Flags of Korean People's Army
(Obverse)	1948	Flag of the Korean People's Army	Initially designed along with the early draft for the Emblem of North Korea in 1948. The slogan reads: "For the independence of the motherland and the people" (조국의 독립과 인민을 위하여). Revived as ceremonial unit color for historical units beginning 2015.
(Reverse)	1948	Flag of the Korean People's Army	With a red star with golden border and bearing a hammer and two sickles. The inspection reads: "Korean People's Army / [Unit number] / 1st (as in ceremonies) Defensive Division" (조선인민군 제1국방사단). Revived as ceremonial unit color for historical units beginning 2015.
Small vexillological symbol or pictogram in black and white showing the different uses of the flag	1948–1961	Flag of the Korean People's Army	Used only as ceremonial unit color for historical units beginning 2013.
Small vexillological symbol or pictogram in black and white showing the different uses of the flag	1948–1961	Flag of the Korean People's Army	Used only as ceremonial unit color for historical units beginning 2013.
Small vexillological symbol or pictogram in black and white showing the different uses of the flag	1948–1961	Flag of the Korean People's Army	Used for Guards units only. The slogan on obverse side reads: "For the freedom and independence of the Motherland" (조국의 자유와 독립을 위하여). The reverse side have a Guards badge with Korean letters reading "[Unit number] / Guards Kang Kon 2nd (as in ceremonies) Infantry Division" (근위강건제2부병사단). Revived as ceremonial unit color for Guards units beginning 2013.
Small vexillological symbol or pictogram in black and white showing the different uses of the flag	1948–1961	Flag of the Korean People's Army	Used for Guards units only. The slogan on obverse side reads: "For the freedom and independence of the Motherland" (조국의 자유와 독립을 위하여). The reverse side have a Guards badge with Korean letters reading "[Unit number] / Guards Kang Kon 2nd (as in ceremonies) Infantry Division" (근위강건제2부병사단). Revived as ceremonial unit color for Guards units beginning 2013.
Small vexillological symbol or pictogram in black and white showing the different uses of the flag	1961–1992	Flag of the Korean People's Army	Latest version shown; emblem adopted in 1992. The slogan reads: "For the unification and independence of the motherland, and the freedom and happiness of the people" (조국의 통일, 독립과 인민의 자유와 행복을 위하여).
Small vexillological symbol or pictogram in black and white showing the different uses of the flag	1992–1993	Flag of the Korean People's Army	Emblem of DPRK updated to the one featuring the Paektu Mountain.
Small vexillological symbol or pictogram in black and white showing the different uses of the flag	1961–1993	Flag of the Korean People's Army	With a red star with golden border and bearing a hammer and two sickles.
Small vexillological symbol or pictogram in black and white showing the different uses of the flag	1993–2023	Flag of the General Staff Department of the Korean People's Army	Seen used during the October 1995 parade, observed very rarely.
Small vexillological symbol or pictogram in black and white showing the different uses of the flag	1993–2023	Flag of the General Staff Department of the Korean People's Army	Seen used during the October 1995 parade, observed very rarely.
Small vexillological symbol or pictogram in black and white showing the different uses of the flag	2023–present	Flag of the General Staff Department of the Korean People's Army	Identical to the new flag of the ground forces except without the blue and white stripes. The slogan reads "For the endless prosperity of the fatherland and the security of the people! (조국의 무궁한 번영과 인민의 안녕을 위하여)", with the date of the founding of the KPA as 2 February 1948 in the canton.
Small vexillological symbol or pictogram in black and white showing the different uses of the flag	2023–present	Flag of the General Staff Department of the Korean People's Army	Party symbol placed within a design containing the façade of the WPK headquarters in Pyongyang, a red shield bearing the emblem of WPK, and two swords.
Flag of the Supreme Commander of the Korean Peoples' Army
	1996–2002	Flag of the Supreme Commander of the Korean People's Army	
	2002–2020	Flag of the Supreme Commander of the Korean People's Army	The Supreme Commander Star on a red flag. Sometimes used as a war flag during military exercises.
Flags of the Branches of the Armed Forces of the DPRK
Small vexillological symbol or pictogram in black and white showing the different uses of the flag	1993–2023	Flag of the Korean People's Army Ground Force	Emblem of KPA with slogan: "For the unification and independence of the motherland, and the freedom and happiness of the people" (조국의 통일, 독립과 인민의 자유와 행복을 위하여). The 4.25 commemorates the foundation of People's Anti-Japanese Guerrilla Army on 25 April 1932. Still used as ceremonial unit color for historical units as of 2025.
Small vexillological symbol or pictogram in black and white showing the different uses of the flag	1993–2023	Flag of the Korean People's Army Ground Force	With Korean letters reading "Revolutionary armed forces of the Workers' Party of Korea, Korean People's Army [unit name] / No.425 unit (in ceremonies)" (조선로동당의 혁명적무장력인 조선인민군 제425 군부대). The number 425 commemorates the foundation of People's Anti-Japanese Guerrilla Army on 25 April 1932. Still used as ceremonial unit color for historical units as of 2025.
Small vexillological symbol or pictogram in black and white showing the different uses of the flag	1993–1994	Flag of the Korean People's Army Ground Force	Flag with a slogan for Kim Il Sung, it reads: "Let us defend the Party's Central Committee headed by dear Comrade Kim Il Sung with our lives!" (경애하는 김일성동지를 수반으로 하는 당중앙위원회를 목숨으로 사수하자!). His name is slightly enlarged.
Small vexillological symbol or pictogram in black and white showing the different uses of the flag	1997–2011	Flag of the Korean People's Army Ground Force	Flag with a slogan for Kim Jong Il when he was in power. The slogan: "Let us defend the headquarters of the revolution headed by the great Comrade Kim Jong Il with our lives!" (위대한 김정일동지를 수반으로 하는 혁명의 수뇌부를 목숨으로 사수하자!). His name is slightly enlarged. The word 혁명의 수뇌부 was later replaced by 당중앙위원회 (Party's Central Committee) in 2011.
Small vexillological symbol or pictogram in black and white showing the different uses of the flag	2012–2023	Flag of the Korean People's Army Ground Force	Flag with a slogan for Kim Jong Un, it reads: "Let us defend the Party's Central Committee headed by the great Comrade Kim Jong Un with our lives!" (위대한 김정은동지를 수반으로 하는 당중앙위원회를 목숨으로 사수하자!). His name is slightly enlarged.
Small vexillological symbol or pictogram in black and white showing the different uses of the flag	2023–present	Flag of the Korean People's Army Ground Force	Identical to the former flag except the emblem of the KPA is defaced with the emblem of the DPRK emblazoned on largened red star, and accomplished by acanthus leaves. The slogan reads "For the endless prosperity of the fatherland and the security of the people! (조국의 무궁한 번영과 인민의 안녕을 위하여)", with the date of founding of the particular unit placed in the canton. This flag is used by units of the Ground Forces to serve as a unit flag. The date of foundation on the canton differs among KPAGF units of regiment/brigade level and above, independent battalions and educational institutions.
Small vexillological symbol or pictogram in black and white showing the different uses of the flag	2023–present	Flag of the Korean People's Army Ground Force	Identical to the former flag except the party symbol is placed within a design containing the facade of the WPK headquarters in Pyongyang, a red shield bearing the emblem of WPK, and two swords. The slogan reads "Let us defend the Party's Central Committee headed by Dear Comrade Kim Jong Un with our lives!" (경애하는 김정은동지를 수반으로 하는 당중앙위원회를 목숨으로 사수하자!)
Small vexillological symbol or pictogram in black and white showing the different uses of the flag	1993–2023	Flag of the Korean People's Army Navy	Emblem of KPA with anchor. Still used as ceremonial unit color for historical units as of 2025.
Small vexillological symbol or pictogram in black and white showing the different uses of the flag	1993–2023	Flag of the Korean People's Army Navy	With Korean letters reading "Revolutionary armed forces of the Workers' Party of Korea, Korean People's Army [unit name] / No.415 unit (in ceremonies)" (조선로동당의 혁명적무장력인 조선인민군 제415 군부대). The number 415 commemorates the birthday of Kim Il-Sung on 15 April. Still used as ceremonial unit color for historical units as of 2025.
Small vexillological symbol or pictogram in black and white showing the different uses of the flag	1993–1994	Flag of the Korean People's Army Navy	Flag with a slogan for Kim Il Sung, it reads: "Let us defend the Party's Central Committee headed by dear Comrade Kim Il Sung with our lives!" (경애하는 김일성동지를 수반으로 하는 당중앙위원회를 목숨으로 사수하자!). His name is slightly enlarged.
Small vexillological symbol or pictogram in black and white showing the different uses of the flag	1997–2011	Flag of the Korean People's Army Navy	Flag with a slogan for Kim Jong Il when he was in power. The slogan: "Let us defend the headquarters of the revolution headed by the great Comrade Kim Jong Il with our lives!" (위대한 김정일동지를 수반으로 하는 혁명의 수뇌부를 목숨으로 사수하자!). His name is slightly enlarged. The word 혁명의 수뇌부 was later replaced by 당중앙위원회 (Party's Central Committee) in 2011.
Small vexillological symbol or pictogram in black and white showing the different uses of the flag	2012–2023	Flag of the Korean People's Army Navy	Flag with the slogan for Kim Jong Un, it reads: "Let us defend the Party's Central Committee headed by the great Comrade Kim Jong Un with our lives!" (위대한 김정은동지를 수반으로 하는 당중앙위원회를 목숨으로 사수하자!). His name is slightly enlarged.
Small vexillological symbol or pictogram in black and white showing the different uses of the flag	2023–present	Flag of the Korean People's Army Navy	Identical to the former flag except the emblem of the KPA is defaced with the emblem of the DPRK emblazoned on largened red star, surrounded by a laurel wreath, and surmounted by an anchor and steering wheel. The slogan reads "For the endless prosperity of the fatherland and the security of the people! (조국의 무궁한 번영과 인민의 안녕을 위하여)", with the date of founding of the particular unit placed in the canton. The representative flag of the whole branch displays the date 28 August 1949.
Small vexillological symbol or pictogram in black and white showing the different uses of the flag	2023–present	Flag of the Korean People's Army Navy	Identical to the former flag except the party symbol is placed within a design containing the façade of the WPK headquarters in Pyongyang, an anchor, a red shield bearing the emblem of WPK. The slogan reads "Let us defend the Party's Central Committee headed by Dear Comrade Kim Jong Un with our lives!" (경애하는 김정은동지를 수반으로 하는 당중앙위원회를 목숨으로 사수하자!)
Small vexillological symbol or pictogram in black and white showing the different uses of the flag	1993–2023, (insignia updated in 2012)	Flag of the Korean People's Army Air and Anti-Air Force	Emblem of KPA with wings. Still used as ceremonial unit color for historical units as of 2025.
Small vexillological symbol or pictogram in black and white showing the different uses of the flag	1993–2023	Flag of the Korean People's Army Air and Anti-Air Force	With Korean letters reading "Revolutionary armed forces of the Workers' Party of Korea, Korean People's Army [unit name] / No.216 unit (in ceremonies)" (조선로동당의 혁명적무장력인 조선인민군 제216 군부대). The number 216 commemorates the birthday of Kim Jong-Il on 16 February. Still used as ceremonial unit color for historical units as of 2025.
Small vexillological symbol or pictogram in black and white showing the different uses of the flag	1993–1994	Flag of the Korean People's Army Air and Anti-Air Force	Flag with a slogan for Kim Il Sung, it reads: "Let us defend the Party's Central Committee headed by dear Comrade Kim Il Sung with our lives!" (경애하는 김일성동지를 수반으로 하는 당중앙위원회를 목숨으로 사수하자!). His name is slightly enlarged.
Small vexillological symbol or pictogram in black and white showing the different uses of the flag	1993–2012	Flag of the Korean People's Army Air and Anti-Air Force	Flag with a slogan for Kim Jong Il when he was in power. The slogan: "Let us defend the headquarters of the revolution headed by the great Comrade Kim Jong Il with our lives!" (위대한 김정일동지를 수반으로 하는 혁명의 수뇌부를 목숨으로 사수하자!). His name is slightly enlarged. Wings and a star above the KPA emblem. The word 혁명의 수뇌부 was later replaced by 당중앙위원회 (Party's Central Committee) in 2011.
Small vexillological symbol or pictogram in black and white showing the different uses of the flag	2012–2023	Flag of the Korean People's Army Air and Anti-Air Force	Flag with a slogan for Kim Jong Un, it reads: "Let us defend the Party's Central Committee headed by the great Comrade Kim Jong Un with our lives!" (위대한 김정은동지를 수반으로 하는 당중앙위원회를 목숨으로 사수하자!). His name is slightly enlarged.
Small vexillological symbol or pictogram in black and white showing the different uses of the flag	2023–present	Flag of the Korean People's Army Air and Anti-Air Force	Identical to the former flag except the emblem of the KPAAF is defaced with the emblem of the DPRK emblazoned on largened red star with additional stars at the top. Lower stripes are arranged as chevrons, and with six trailing jet fighters emerging behind the emblem. The slogan reads "For the endless prosperity of the fatherland and the security of the people! (조국의 무궁한 번영과 인민의 안녕을 위하여)", with the date of founding of the particular unit placed in the canton. The representative flag of the whole branch displays the date 29 November 1945.
Small vexillological symbol or pictogram in black and white showing the different uses of the flag	2023–present	Flag of the Korean People's Army Air and Anti-Air Force	Identical to the former flag except the party symbol is placed within a design containing the façade of the WPK headquarters in Pyongyang, a red shield bearing the emblem of WPK, and an eagle. The slogan reads "Let us defend the Party's Central Committee headed by Dear Comrade Kim Jong Un with our lives!" (경애하는 김정은동지를 수반으로 하는 당중앙위원회를 목숨으로 사수하자!)
Small vexillological symbol or pictogram in black and white showing the different uses of the flag	2018–2020	Flag of the Korean People's Army Strategic Force	Emblem of KPA on an upper half globe. Reverted to army flag in 2020.
Small vexillological symbol or pictogram in black and white showing the different uses of the flag	2018–2020	Flag of the Korean People's Army Strategic Force	With Korean letters reading "Revolutionary armed forces of the Workers' Party of Korea, Korean People's Army [unit name] / No.108 unit (in ceremonies)" (조선로동당의 혁명적무장력인 조선인민군 제108 군부대). The number 108 commemorates the birthday of Kim Jong-Un on 8 January.
Small vexillological symbol or pictogram in black and white showing the different uses of the flag	2023–present	Flag of the Korean People's Army Strategic Force	With the same pattern as army flag but has the date 3 July 1999 on obverse side.
Small vexillological symbol or pictogram in black and white showing the different uses of the flag	2023–present	Flag of the Korean People's Army Strategic Force	With the same pattern as army flag but has the date 3 July 1999 on obverse side.
Small vexillological symbol or pictogram in black and white showing the different uses of the flag	2023–present	Flag of the North Korea's Missile Administration (formerly in English "Missile General Bureau").	The Flag of the Missile General Bureau is seen with its Emblem in a large form with the founding date of 30 April 2016, The slogan reads "For the security of the Democratic People's Republic of Korea and the security of the people!" (조선민주주의인민공화국의 안전과 인민의 안녕을 위하여)
Small vexillological symbol or pictogram in black and white showing the different uses of the flag	2023–present	Flag of the North Korea's Missile Administration (formerly in English "Missile General Bureau").	Identical to the Backside flags of the KPA except the party symbol is placed within a design containing the façade of the WPK headquarters in Pyongyang.
Small vexillological symbol or pictogram in black and white showing the different uses of the flag	2018–2020	Flag of the Korean People's Army Special Operation Force	Emblem of KPA with the Big Dipper. Reverted to army flag in 2020.
Small vexillological symbol or pictogram in black and white showing the different uses of the flag	2018–2020	Flag of the Korean People's Army Special Operation Force	With Korean letters reading "Revolutionary armed forces of the Workers' Party of Korea, Korean People's Army [unit name]". / No.506 unit (in ceremonies)" (조선로동당의 혁명적무장력인 조선인민군 제506 군부대). The number 506 commemorates the 7th Congress of the Workers' Party of Korea on 6 May 2016.
Small vexillological symbol or pictogram in black and white showing the different uses of the flag	2023–present	Flag of the Korean People's Army Special Operation Force	With the same pattern as army flag but has the date 7 February 1969 on obverse side.
Small vexillological symbol or pictogram in black and white showing the different uses of the flag	2023–present	Flag of the Korean People's Army Special Operation Force	With the same pattern as army flag but has the date 7 February 1969 on obverse side.
Small vexillological symbol or pictogram in black and white showing the different uses of the flag	2007–2023	Flag of the Worker-Peasant Red Guards	Slogan used until 2012, since then the flag shares the same motto as the rest of the KPA. Has the emblem of the Guards in center.
Small vexillological symbol or pictogram in black and white showing the different uses of the flag	2007–2023	Flag of the Worker-Peasant Red Guards	With Korean letters reading "Worker-Peasant Red Guards".
Small vexillological symbol or pictogram in black and white showing the different uses of the flag	2023–present	Flag of the Worker-Peasant Red Guards	The slogan reads "For the endless prosperity of the fatherland and the security of the people!" (조국의 무궁한 번영과 인민의 안녕을 위하여)
Small vexillological symbol or pictogram in black and white showing the different uses of the flag	2023–present	Flag of the Worker-Peasant Red Guards	With Korean letters reading "Worker-Peasant Red Guards".
Small vexillological symbol or pictogram in black and white showing the different uses of the flag	2023–present	Flag of the Ministry of Social Security	A flag with the emblem of the Ministry of Social Security in the middle. Also used by Social Security Forces units. The slogan reads "Protect the political security of the socialist fatherland and the happiness of the People!" (사회주의조국의 정치적안전과 인민의 행북을 보위하여)
Small vexillological symbol or pictogram in black and white showing the different uses of the flag	2023–present	Flag of the Ministry of Social Security	A flag with the emblem of the Ministry of Social Security in the middle. Also used by Social Security Forces units. The slogan reads "Protect the political security of the socialist fatherland and the happiness of the People!" (사회주의조국의 정치적안전과 인민의 행북을 보위하여)
Small vexillological symbol or pictogram in black and white showing the different uses of the flag	2023–present	Flag of the National Intelligence Agency	The slogan reads "For the firm security of the party and the country, and the victory of the great achievements of the Juche Revolution!" (당과 국가의 굳건한 안전과 주체혁명위업의 승리를 위하여)
Small vexillological symbol or pictogram in black and white showing the different uses of the flag	2023–present	Flag of the National Intelligence Agency	The slogan reads "For the firm security of the party and the country, and the victory of the great achievements of the Juche Revolution!" (당과 국가의 굳건한 안전과 주체혁명위업의 승리를 위하여)
Naval ensigns
	1990s–present	Naval ensign of North Korea	Red flag with Paektu Mountain in rays in a disc with national color outlines and a red star.
	1990s–present	Naval ensign of North Korea for Guards Units	
	1990s–present	Naval jack of North Korea	Identical to the naval ensign but has a white disc with a red star.

== See also ==
- List of Korean flags
- List of South Korean flags
- Flag of North Korea
- Emblem of North Korea
