= Unification Shoes =

Shoes produced by North and South Korea

- Hangul: 통일신발
- Hanja: 統一신발
- RR: Tongil sinbal
- MR: T'ongil sinbal

Unification Shoes (Korean: 통일신발) are shoes of which the soles are made in South Korea and the tops in North Korea. They began to be produced in 2005. The shoes are marketed under the "Stafild" brand name in South Korea. The North Korean portion of the shoes are manufactured in the Kaesong Industrial Region. Pairs of the shoes were donated to North Korea on a number of occasions. 10,000 pairs were donated in 2007.

== See also ==
- Korean reunification
- Unification flag
