= Flag of South Korea =

Republic of Korea
- Taegeukgi, Taegukgi
- Use: National flag and ensign
- Proportion: 2:3
- Adopted: 27 January 1883; 143 years ago (original version, used by the Joseon dynasty); 29 June 1942; 84 years ago (during Japanese occupation, by the exiled Provisional Government of the Republic of Korea); 12 July 1948; 78 years ago (for South Korea, by the Constituent National Assembly); 15 October 1949; 77 years ago (current geometry); 30 May 2011; 15 years ago (current colors)
- Design: A white field with a centered red and blue taegeuk surrounded by four trigrams
- Designed by: Lee Eung-jun (Designed); Pak Yŏnghyo (Selected); Gojong (Approved)
- Naval jack
- Use: Naval jack
- Proportion: 2:3
- Design: A blue field with a white canton that has a red and blue taegeuk superimposed on two crossed anchors.
- Governmental ensign
- Use: Government ensign
- Proportion: 2:3
- Design: A white field with the logo of the government in the middle

- Flag of South Korea
- Hangul: 태극기
- Hanja: 太極旗
- RR: Taegeukgi
- MR: T'aegŭkki

The national flag of the Republic of Korea (South Korea), also known as the Taegeukgi (Korean: 태극기; Hanja: 太極旗), consists of three components: a white rectangular background, a red and blue taegeuk in its center, accompanied by four black trigrams, one in each corner. The predecessors to the current Taegeukgi were used as the national flag of Korea by the Joseon dynasty, the Korean Empire, as well as the Korean government-in-exile during Japanese rule. South Korea adopted Taegeukgi for its national flag in 1948.

== History ==
In 1876, the absence of a national flag became an issue for Korea, at the time reigned over by the Joseon dynasty. Before 1876, Korea did not have a national flag, but the king had his own royal standard. The lack of a national flag became a quandary during negotiations for the Japan–Korea Treaty of 1876, at which the delegate of Japan displayed the Japanese national flag, whereas the Joseon dynasty had no corresponding national symbol to exhibit. At that time, some proposed to create a national flag, but the Joseon government looked upon the matter as unimportant and unnecessary. By 1880, the proliferation of foreign negotiations led to the need for a national flag. The most popular proposal was described in the "Korea Strategy" papers, written by the Chinese delegate Huang Zunxian. It proffered to incorporate the flag of the Qing dynasty of China into that of the Joseon dynasty of Korea. In response to the Chinese proposal, the Joseon government dispatched delegate Lee Young-Sook to consider the scheme with Chinese statesman and diplomat Li Hongzhang. Li agreed with some elements of Huang's suggestion while accepting that Korea would make some alterations. The Qing government assented to Li's conclusions, but the degree of enthusiasm with which the Joseon government explored this proposal is unknown.

The issue remained unpursued for a period but reemerged with the negotiation of the United States–Korea Treaty of 1882, also known as the Shufeldt Treaty. The U.S. emissary Robert Wilson Shufeldt suggested that Korea adopt a national flag to represent its sovereignty. The king of Joseon, Kojong, ordered government officials Sin Heon and Kim Hong-jip to begin working on a new flag. Kim Hong-jip in turn asked delegate Lee Eung-jun to create the first design, which Lee Eung-jun presented to the Chinese official Ma Jianzhong. Ma Jianzhong argued against Huang Zunxian's proposal that Korea adopt the flag of the Qing dynasty, and proposed a modified dragon flag. Kojong rejected this idea. Ma suggested Lee Eung-jun's Taegeuk and Eight Trigrams flag. It is sometimes claimed that Kim and Ma proposed changes to it on 27 May 1882 (Lunar date 11 April): Kim proposed changing the red to blue and white; Ma proposed a white field, a red and black taegeuk, trigrams in black, and a red border. However, since the Taguk flag was already in use during the signing of the Joseon–United States Treaty of 1882 on 22 May 1882, The Taeguk flag design was already established and in use prior to Ma's proposal. In September 1882, Pak Yŏnghyo presented a scale model for taegukgi to the Joseon government, it was created in cooperation with Kim Man-sik, Soh Kwang-pom and others with advice from British consul William George Aston and British captain James, later Gojong approved the design. Pak Yŏnghyo became the first person to use the taegukgi in 1882. 2 October 1882 issue of the Japanese newspaper Jiji shimpō credited Gojong as the designer of the taegukgi (i.e., a flag with a red and blue taegeuk and four trigrams). On 27 January 1883, the Joseon government officially promulgated the taegukgi to be used as the official national flag.

In 1919, a flag similar to the current South Korean flag was used by the Korean government-in-exile based in China. The term taegukgi began to be used in 1942. The taeguk and taegukgi grew as powerful symbols of independence in the 1,500 demonstrations during colonial rule.

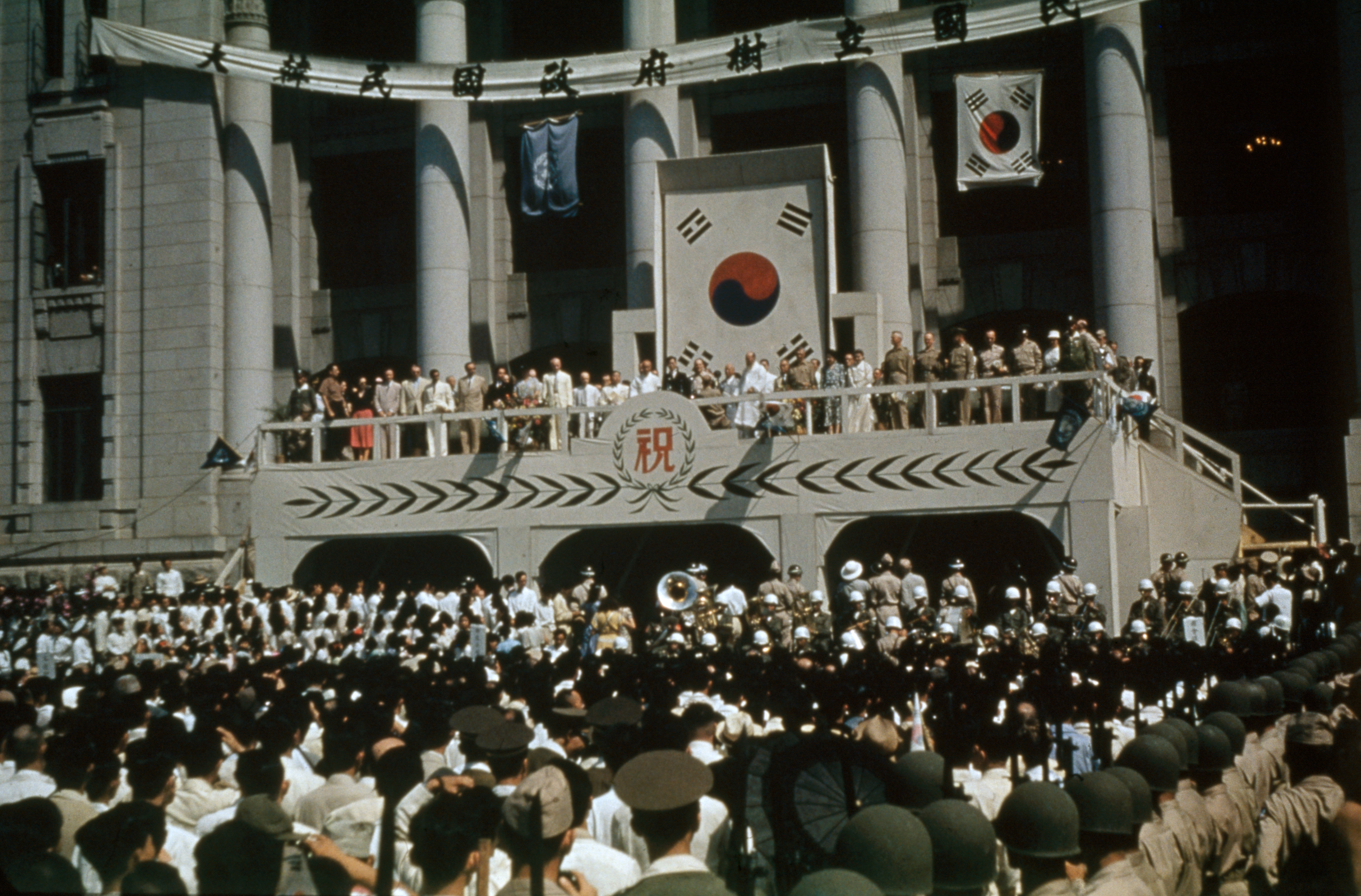
Inauguration of the First Republic of Korea on 15 August 1948

Following the restoration of Korean independence in 1945, the taegukgi design was again widely used. It remained in use as the southern portion of Korea became a republic under the influence of the United States and even in the People's Republic of Korea for a time. The United States Army Military Government in Korea started to use the taegukgi alongside the flag of the United States on 14 January 1946. On 12 July 1948, the Constituent National Assembly of the Republic of Korea adopted the taegukgi as the national flag. Following the establishment of the South Korean state in August 1948, the first Republic of Korea created the National Flag Correction Committee in January 1949 to establish the modern standardization for the taegukgi. On 15 October 1949, the Ministry of Education and Culture announced the National Flag Production Law.

The northern portion of Korea also used the taegukgi even during the partition of Korea in 1945. It was used until the new design was adopted in July 1948.

On 21 February 1984, exact dimensional specifications and etiquettes for the flag were codified. On 15 October 1997, a precise color scheme for the flag was fixed via presidential decree for the first time.

== Symbolism ==
The flag's field is white, a traditional color in Korean culture that was common in the daily attire of 19th-century Koreans and still appears in contemporary versions of traditional Korean garments such as the hanbok. The color represents peace and purity.

The circle in the flag's center symbolizes harmony in the world. Derived from the Chinese I Ching and Taiji (philosophy), known in the west as the Yin and Yang, the blue half represents negative energy (Yin), and the red half represents the positive energy (Yang).

Together, the trigrams (Note: Korean: 괘; Hanja: 卦; RR: gwae) represent movement and harmony as fundamental principles. Each trigram represents one of the four classical elements, as described below:

| Trigram | Korean name | Celestial body | Season | Cardinal direction | Virtue | Family | Natural element | Meaning | Social fabric |
|---|---|---|---|---|---|---|---|---|---|
| ☰ | geon (건; 乾) | heaven (천; 天) | summer (하; 夏) | south (남; 南) | wisdom (인; 仁) | father (부; 父) | air (천; 天) | justice (정의; 正義) | The strong stay together. |
| ☷ | gon (곤; 坤) | earth (지; 地) | winter (동; 冬) | north (북; 北) | righteousness (의; 義) | mother (모; 母) | earth (토; 土) | vitality (생명력; 生命力) | The weak stay together. |
| ☲ | ri (리; 離) | sun (일; 日) | spring (춘; 春) | east (동; 東) | courtesy (례; 禮) | daughter (녀; 女) | fire (화; 火) | fruition (결실; 結實) | The strong protect the weak. |
| ☵ | gam (감; 坎) | moon (월; 月) | autumn (추; 秋) | west (서; 西) | intelligence (지; 智) | son (자; 子) | water (수; 水) | wisdom (지혜; 智慧) | The weak protect the strong. |

=== Cultural role in contemporary South Korean society ===
The name of the South Korean flag is used in the title of a 2004 film about the Korean War, Taegukgi.

A Taegukgi with the word 不遠復 (Note: Korean: 불원복; RR: Bulwonbok; lit. '[We will] Restore Soon') appeared in a 2011 film My Way.

A Taegukgi with the word 大韓獨立 (Note: Korean: 대한독립; RR: Daehan dongnip; lit. 'The independence of Greater Korea') appeared in a stage musical Hero.

== Specifications ==
Proper vertical display of the flag

=== Dimensions ===
Flag construction sheet

The width and height are in the ratio of 3:2. There are five sections on the flag, the taegeuk and the four groups of bars (trigrams). The diameter of the taegeuk is half of the height of the flag. The top of the taegeuk is red and the bottom of the taegeuk is blue. The width of each trigram is the radius of the taegeuk. The distance between taegeuk and four trigrams is half of the radius of the taegeuk. The design of the taegeuk, as well as the trigrams residing in each of the four corners, are geometrically defined. The flag code also designates the color of a flag pole, which should be either white, silver, or green, and provides a construction sheet of the pole's end cap, which is shaped like a flower bud of Mugunghwa.

=== Colors ===
Darker version of the flag using RGB approximations of semiofficial Pantone approximations, and also the official 1997–2011 color scheme.

The colors of the taegukgi are specified in the Ordinance Act of the Law concerning the National Flag of the Republic of Korea (Korean: 대한민국 국기법 시행령). The color scheme was unspecified until 1997, when the South Korean government decided to standardize specifications for the flag. On 25 October 1997, a Presidential ordinance on the standard specification of the South Korean flag was promulgated, and that specification was acceded by the National Flag Law in July 2007.

Colors are defined in legislation by the Munsell and CIE color systems as follows:

| Scheme | Munsell | CIE (x, y, Y) | Pantone | Hex triplet (Note: Converted from CIE.) |
|---|---|---|---|---|
| White | N 9.5 | —N/a | —N/a | #FFFFFF |
| Red | 6.0R 4.5/14 | 0.5640, 0.3194, 15.3 | 186 C | #CD2E3A |
| Blue | 5.0PB 3.0/12 | 0.1556, 0.1354, 6.5 | 294 C | #0047A0 |
| Black | N 0.5 | —N/a | —N/a | #000000 |

=== Flag days ===
The days required to display taegukgi are defined by the National Flag Law of the Republic of Korea (대한민국국기법) as follows:

- 1 March — March First Day
- 6 June — Memorial Day (half-mast needed)
- 17 July — Constitution Day
- 15 August — Liberation Day
- 1 October — Armed Forces Day
- 3 October — National Foundation Day
- 9 October — Hangul Day
- Any day for the state funeral (half-mast needed)

Apart from these days, the Government of South Korea and local authorities in South Korea also call for the display of taegukgi in other days under special conditions.

=== Laws on desecrations ===
The South Korean flag is considered by a large part of the country's citizens to represent the "Korean ethnos" rather than solely the South Korean state; consequently flag desecration by the country's citizens is rare when compared to other countries, where citizens may desecrate their own national flags as political statements. Thus those South Korean citizens opposed to the state's actions or even its existence will still treat their national flag with reverence and respect: "There is therefore none of the parodying or deliberate desecration of the state flag that one encounters in the countercultures of other countries."

Regardless of frequency, the South Korean Criminal Act punishes desecration of the South Korean national flag in various ways:

- Article 105 imposes up to 5 years in prison, disfranchisement of up to 10 years, or a fine up to 7 million South Korean won for damaging, removing, or staining a South Korean flag or emblem with intent to insult the South Korean state. Article 5 makes this crime punishable, even if done by aliens outside South Korea.
- Article 106 imposes up to 1 year in prison, disfranchisement of up to 5 years, or a fine up to 2 million South Korean won for defaming a South Korean flag or emblem with intent to insult the South Korean state. Article 5 makes this crime punishable, even if done by aliens outside South Korea.

South Korea also criminalizes not just desecration of the South Korean flag, but the flags of other countries as well:

- Article 109 imposes up to 2 years in prison or a fine up to 3 million South Korean won for damaging, removing, or staining a foreign flag or emblem with intent to insult a foreign country. Article 110 forbids prosecution without foreign governmental complaint.

== Gallery ==
Joseon naval ensign, based on a Taoist flag called jwadogi (坐纛旗) with elements of the Nakseo

Joseon royal standard (1392–1907)

Taegukgi published in U.S. Navy book Flags of Maritime Nations in July 1882

Taegukgi (November 1882)

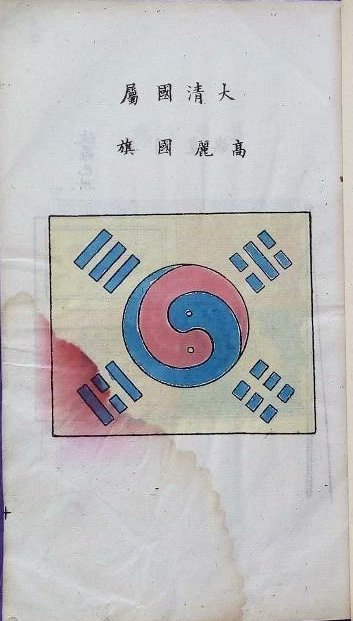
Taegukgi published in a Qing diplomatic book Tōngshāng Zhāngchéng Chéng'àn Huìbiān (通商章程成案彙編), edited by Li Hongzhang (March 1883). (Note: Annotation reads "The flag of Goryeo belonging to the Great Qing". Joseon was sometimes called 'Goryeo' in China.)

Taegukgi given to O. N. Denny (1888)

Taegukgi (1893)

Flag of the Korean Empire (1897–1910)

Imperial standard of the Korean Empire (1897–1907)

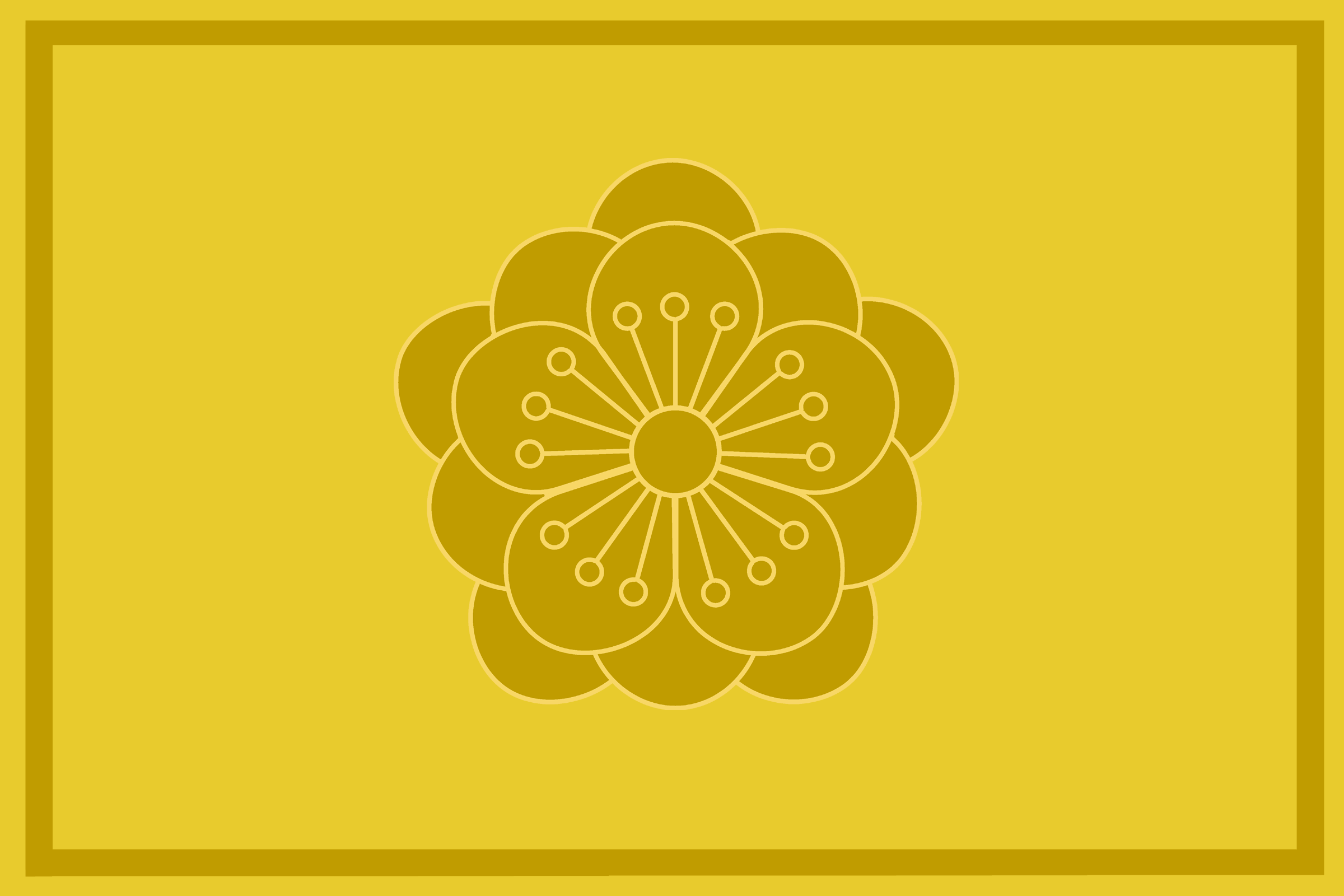
Imperial standard of the Korean Empire (1908–1910)

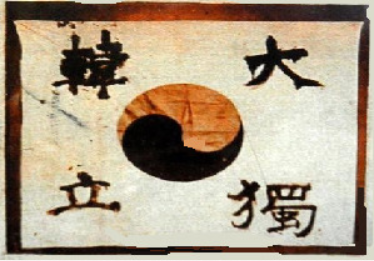
A flag made by An Jung-geun, a Korean independence activist who died in 1910. "大韓獨立" is written.

Flag of Korean protestors used during the March First Movement (1919) (Note: Version shown here was made by Pyongyang Soongsil School.)

Flag of the Provisional Government of the Republic of Korea from 1919 to 1948 used in exile in China

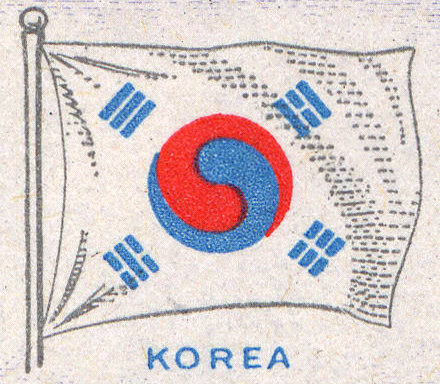
Taegukgi on an Overrun Countries series U.S. postage stamp (1944)

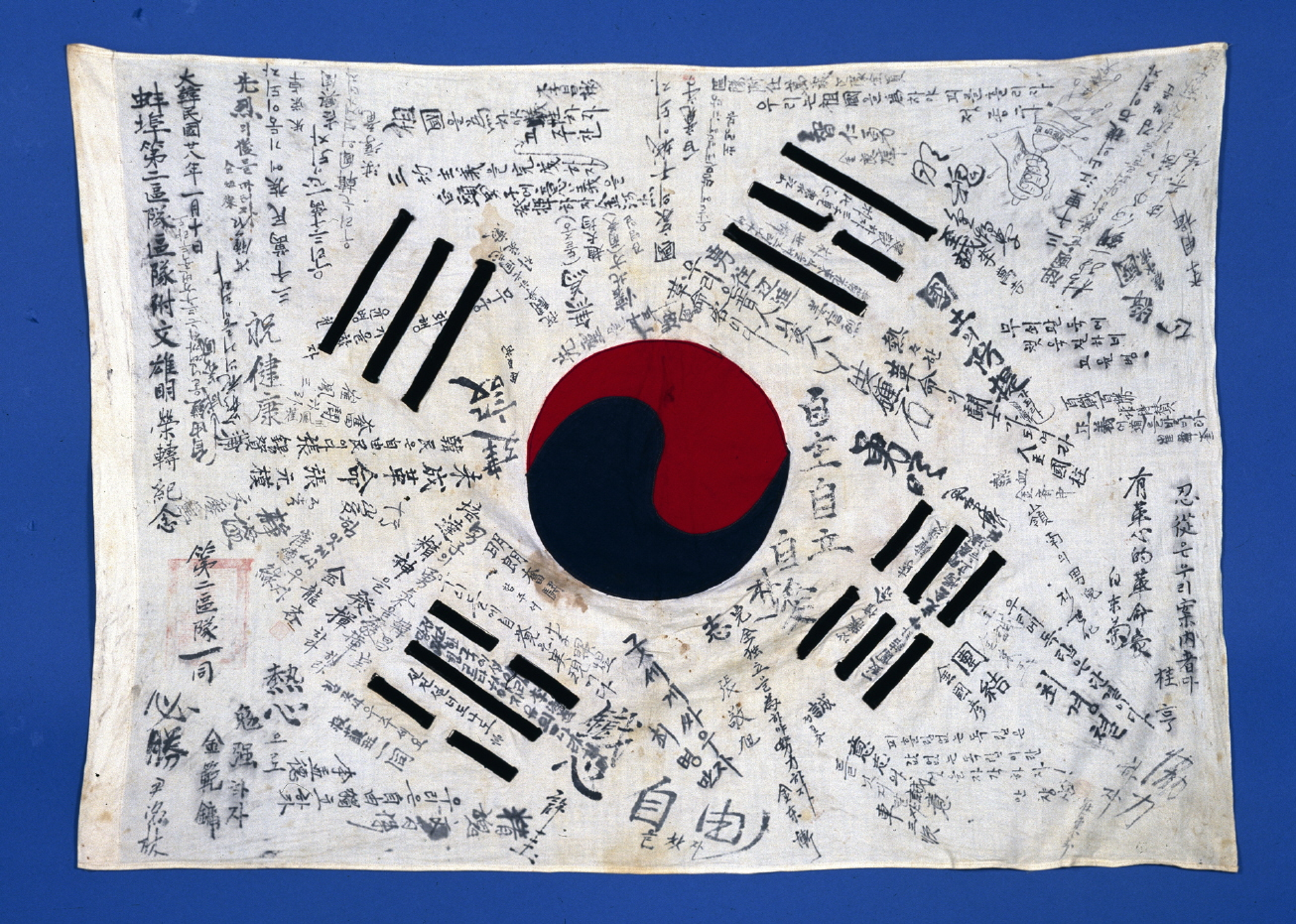
Taegukgi with signatures by Korean Liberation Army (1945)

A marching flag kept by the commander of the Independence Army

A flag of the People's Republic of Korea from August 1945 until December 1945, when the USAMGIK outlawed the PRK

The flag of the United States used during the U.S. military occupation of the southern part of Korea from 1945 to 1948

Taegukgi used by the United States Army Military Government in Korea from 1945 to 1948

Post-independence South Korean flag until 15 October 1949

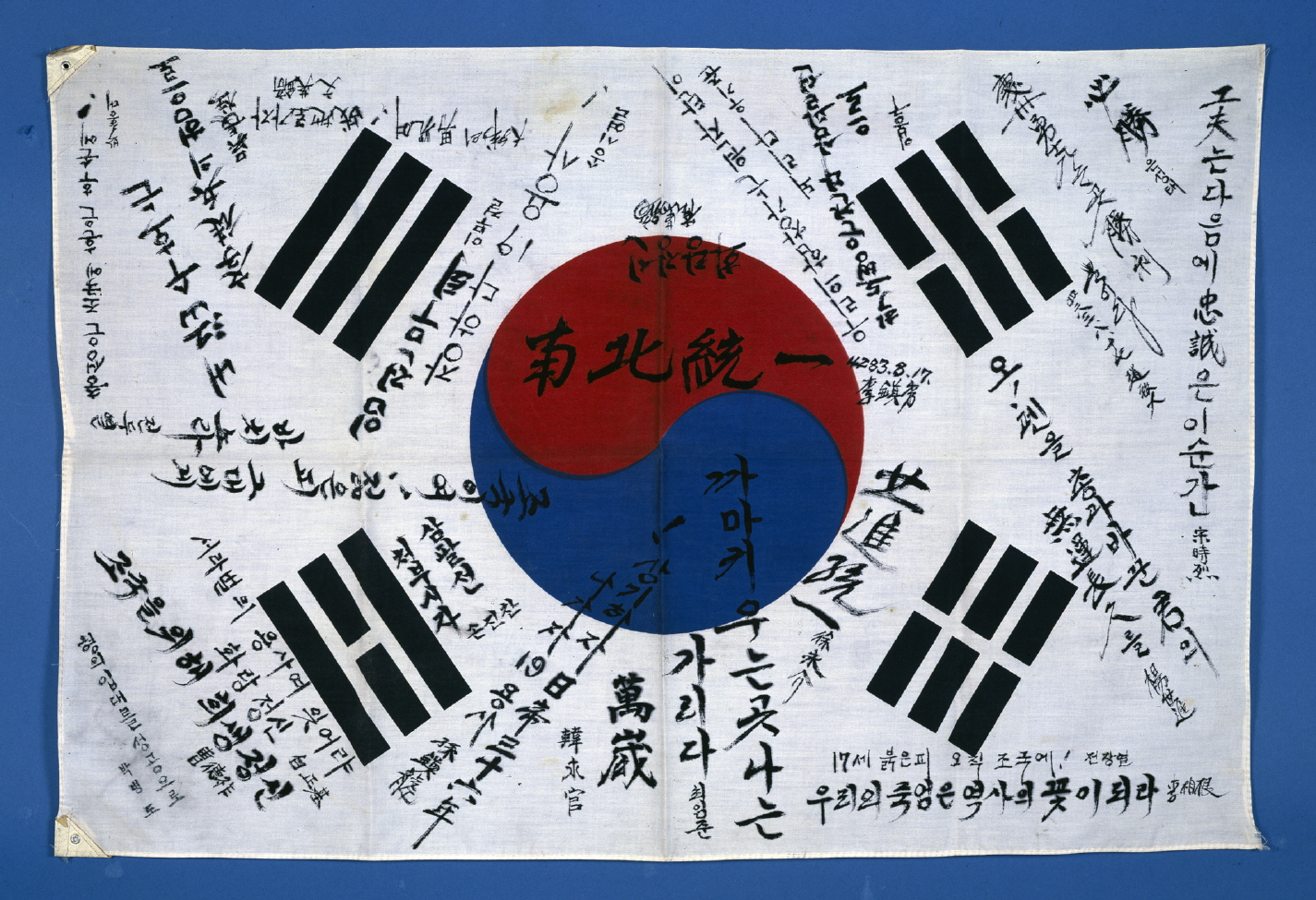
Taegukgi with anti-North Korean mottos and signatures by student soldiers from Gyeongju (1950)

Flag of the Republic of Korea Army

Flag of the Republic of Korea Air Force

Flag of the Republic of Korea Marine Corps

Korean Unification Flag

== See also ==
- Flag of North Korea
- List of Korean flags
- List of South Korean flags
- Korean Unification Flag
- Pledge of allegiance to the flag of South Korea
