= Flag of North Korea =

Democratic People's Republic of Korea
- "Blue and Red Flag of the Republic"
- Use: National flag and ensign
- Proportion: 1:1.65 (20:33)
- Adopted: 10 July 1948 (introduced); 8 September 1948 (adopted); 22 October 1992 (standardised); 23 March 2026 (ratio changed)
- Design: A wide horizontal red stripe bordered above and below by a thin white stripe and a broad blue stripe. The red stripe is charged near the hoist with a five-pointed red star inside a white disc.
- Designed by: Kim Il Sung, Kim Chu-gyong, or the Soviet government (Note: North Korean government sources credit Kim Il Sung with designing the flag. This credit was previously given to North Korean artist Kim Chu-gyong. Pak Il, a Soviet-Korean interpreter, claimed that it was designed by the government of the Soviet Union.)

The national flag of the Democratic People's Republic of Korea (North Korea) consists of a wide horizontal red stripe bordered above and below by a thin white stripe and a broad blue stripe. The red stripe is charged near the hoist with a five-pointed red star inside a white disc. The design of the flag is defined in the North Korean constitution and regulations regarding the use and manufacture of the flag are outlined in the country's national flag law.

The flag was officially adopted on 8 September 1948, with the passing of North Korea's first constitution by the 1st Supreme People's Assembly. The North Korean government credits Kim Il Sung, the country's founder and first leader, with designing the flag; however, North Korean artist Kim Chu-gyong was previously recognised as its designer. Pak Il, a Soviet-Korean interpreter, claimed that it was designed by the government of the Soviet Union, and his account was corroborated by another Soviet-Korean, Chŏng Sangjin.

The display of the North Korean flag is banned in South Korea by the National Security Act, but exceptions have been made for film and television productions, as well as sports competitions.

== Names ==
In North Korea, the flag is known by various names, including the "Blue and Red Flag of the Republic", (Note: Korean: 람홍색공화국기[발]; Hanja: 藍紅色共和國旗[발]; RR: Lamhongsaek Gonghwagukgi[bal]; MR: Lamhongsaek Konghwagukki[ppal]) the "Blue and Red National Flag", (Note: Korean: 람홍색국기; Hanja: 藍紅色國旗; RR: Hongramsaek Gukgi; MR: Hongramsaek Kukki) the "Red-Blue Five-Pointed Star Flag", (Note: Korean: 홍람오각별기; Hanja: 紅藍五角星旗; RR: Hongramogakbyeolgi; MR: Hongramogakpyŏlgi) and the "Flag of the Republic". (Note: Korean: 공화국기; Hanja: 共和國旗; RR: Gonghwagukgi; MR: Konghwagukki) In South Korea, it is known as the "Flag of the People's Republic" (Note: Korean: 인민공화국기; Hanja: 人民共和國旗; RR: Inmin Gonghwagukgi; MR: Inmin Konghwagukki or Korean: 인공기; Hanja: 人共旗; RR: Ingonggi; MR: In'gonggi) or pejoratively as the "Flag of the Northern Puppet". (Note: Korean: 북괴기; Hanja: 北傀旗; RR: Bukgoegi; MR: Pukkoegi)

== Design ==
The flag from 1948 to 2026 (as standardised in 1992)

The design of the flag was defined in Chapter VII, Article 170 of the Socialist Constitution of the Democratic People's Republic of Korea, 1948 (2014 revision). It stated:

The national flag of the Democratic People's Republic of Korea consists of a central red panel, bordered both above and below by a narrow white stripe and a broad blue stripe. The central red panel bears a five-pointed red star within a white circle near the hoist. The ratio of the width to the length is 1:2.

The article was retained from the country's provisional constitution, which was drafted in late 1947 and adopted at a special session of the People's Assembly of North Korea in February 1948. During the session, assembly chairman Kim Tu-bong read the article describing the national flag (originally Article 100) and asked for opinions from delegates. Representative An Mong-yong expressed his concerns that the flag would fold easily when hoisted because of its length, and proposed changing the width-to-length ratio of the flag from 1:2 to 2:3. An's proposal was dismissed by Kim Tu-bong, who assured An that the existing dimensions would not be a problem.

On 23 March 2026, a new amendment was ratified that changed the flag's proportions from 1:2 to 1:1.65 (20:33 as an integral number). The design of the flag is now defined in Chapter VII, Article 166. It states:

The national flag of the Democratic People’s Republic of Korea has a wide red band in the center, bordered above and below by narrow white bands, followed by blue bands at the top and bottom.

Near the hoist side of the red band is a white circle containing a red five‑pointed star.

The ratio of the flag’s width to length is 1:1.65.

=== Symbolism ===
Vertical display of the flag

Different sources give conflicting explanations of the flag's symbolism. According to an article published on 8 August 2013 in the Rodong Sinmun, the official newspaper of the ruling Workers' Party of Korea, Kim Il Sung gave the following significance to the flag's elements after designing it:

The red colour of the flag symbolises the anti-Japanese fervour, the red blood shed by the Korean patriots and the invincible might of our people firmly united to support the Republic. The white colour symbolises the one bloodline, one land, one language, one culture of our monoethnic country, which lived in purity. And blue stands for the gallant visage of our people, symbolising the spirit of the Korean people fighting for world peace and progress.

Pak Il, a Soviet-Korean interpreter who claimed to have translated from Russian the original flag designs proposed by the Soviet government, also claimed that the flag was initially intended to be hoisted vertically, and gave the following as the original explanation of the flag's symbolism:

The red stripe was to symbolise the land of the new Korea, illuminated by the red star of communism. The blue stripes surrounding the flag were to symbolise the seas surrounding the Korean peninsula [the Yellow Sea and the Sea of Japan].

The US Central Intelligence Agency's World Factbook meanwhile states that the colours of the flag – red, white, and blue – are considered national colours and symbolise, respectively: revolutionary traditions; purity, strength, and dignity; and sovereignty, peace, and friendship. It also states that the red star is a national symbol and represents socialism.

The white circle and stripes originally symbolized the purity and homogeneity of the Korean people. In 2026, following North Korea's abandonment of Korean reunification and adoption of the two hostile states theory, Naenara's description was amended to say the white circle and stripes represent "the loyalty of the Korean people who support the leadership of the Party and the leader with a pure mind".

=== Construction ===
The North Korean government has specified sizes, colours, and manufacturing parameters in which the flag is to be made. They are detailed in Appendix I of the National Flag Law of the Democratic People's Republic of Korea, 1992 (2012 revision). The width-to-length ratio of the flag was 1:2. The flag is divided into six vertical sections, with the top and bottom sixths being blue stripes. The middle four-sixths further divide into 24 sections, with the top and bottom twenty-fourths being white stripes, and the other twenty-two twenty-fourths being red. The center of the red star (and of the white disc that surrounds it) is at half the flag's height and one-third of its length. The diameter of the white disc is two-thirds the combined height of the red and white stripes. The imaginary disc described by the points of the red star has a diameter equal to half the height of the white stripe from the white disc's diameter. The points of the red star do not touch the circumference of the white disc.

The aspect ratio of the flag is amended in the Constitution of the Democratic People's Republic of Korea, March 2026 revision.

== Protocol ==
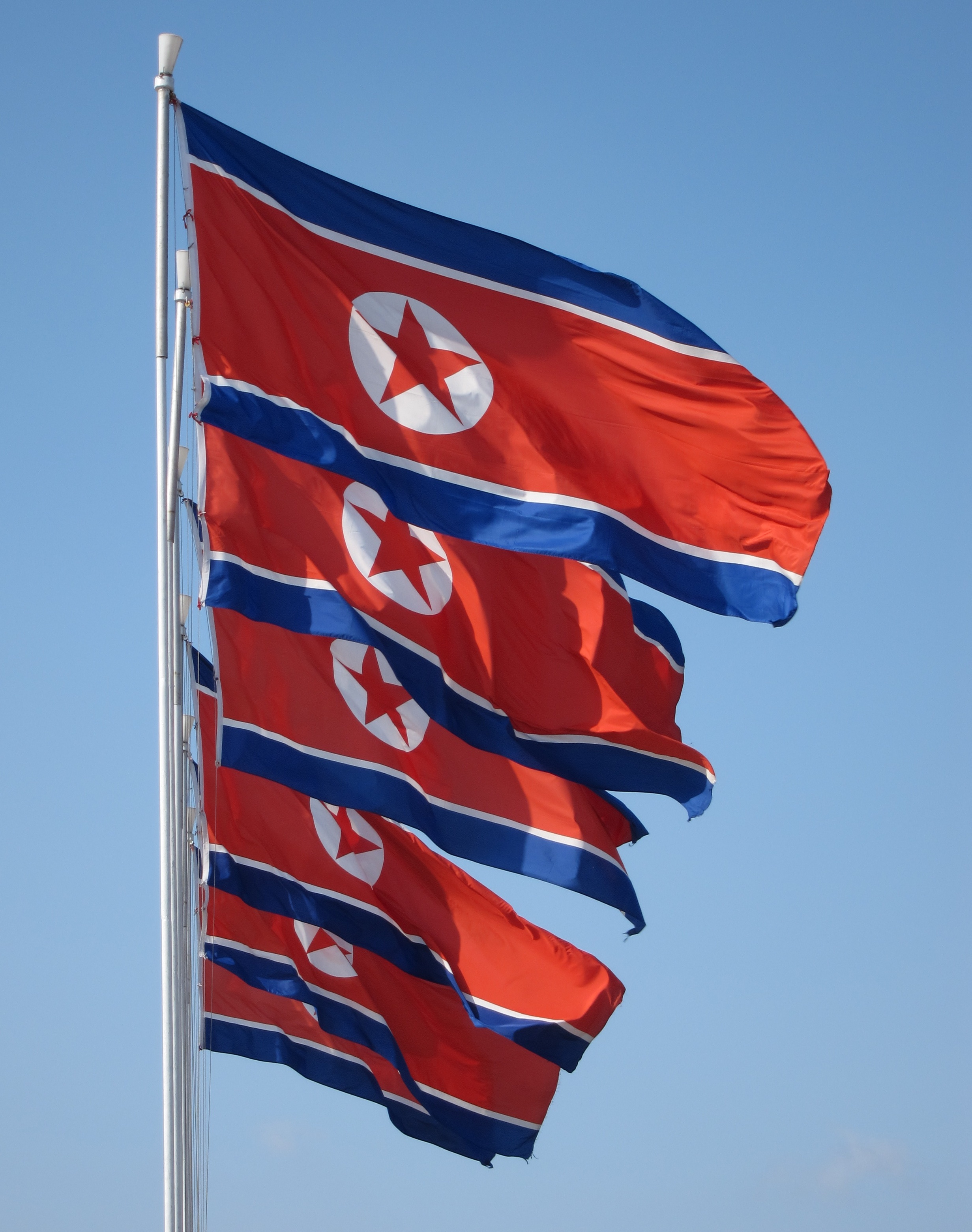
North Korean flags flying near the Kumsusan Palace of the Sun

The national flag law outlines regulations regarding the display and handling of the national flag. The North Korean flag is flown regularly from the Kumsusan Palace of the Sun, government buildings, courtrooms, and diplomatic missions abroad. It may also be flown from "other required places and the government office buildings of overseas Korean residents' organizations". Gold tassels measuring one-eighth of the flag width may be attached to the fly side of flags flown during diplomatic ceremonies. The flag is flown or draped as a symbol of the state during state holidays and memorial days, election days, and important state events. Between April and September, the flag should be raised at around 7:00 to 8:00 a.m. and lowered at around 7:00 to 8:00 p.m. Between October and March, the flag should be raised at around 8:00 to 9:00 a.m. and lowered at around 5:00 to 6:00 p.m. The flag must be raised and lowered slowly by a designated person with an assistant present. The flag must be raised to the end of the flagpole regardless of its use at full-mast or half-mast; in the latter case, the flag should be lowered after reaching the end. The flag may not be raised in severe weather conditions. Damaged, faded or substandard flags must not be used.

The national flag of North Korea takes precedent over other flags of the state, but not necessarily the flags of other countries. When the national flag is flown with other flags of the state, it should be flown first, either in the center or on the opposite left, and higher than the others. During a parade, it should be flown at the front of the procession. The North Korean flag should only be flown alongside the national flags of countries which recognise North Korea; in such cases, all flags must be of the same size and height.

== History ==
=== Background ===
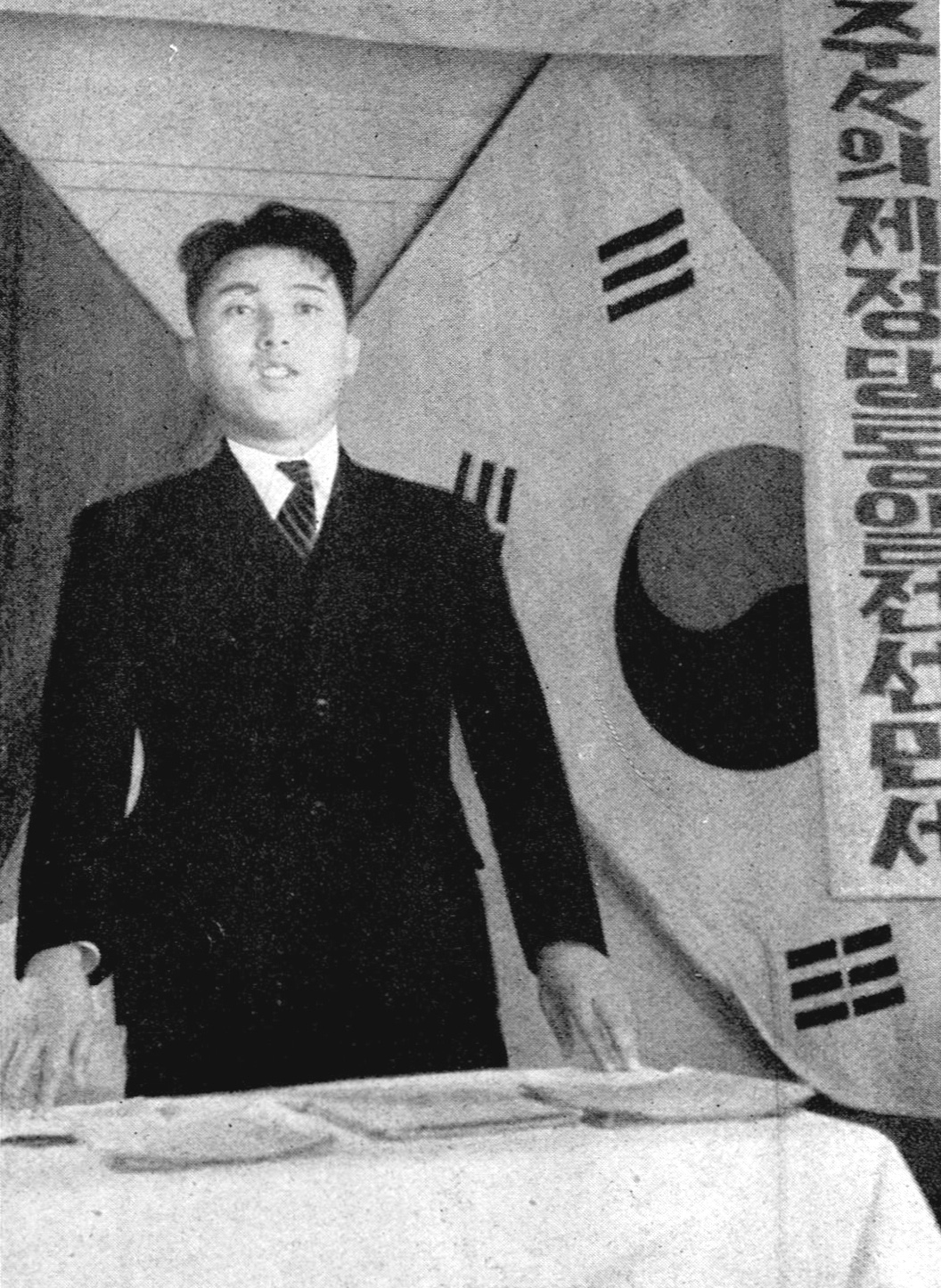
Kim Il Sung giving a speech in front of the Soviet flag and the taegukgi in 1946

Korea adopted its first national flag, the taegukgi (태극기) or "Flag of Great Extremes", in 1883. The taegukgi is a white field with a centered blue and red taegeuk surrounded by four trigrams, representing sky, water, land, and fire. It was used by the Korean Empire up until its annexation by Imperial Japan in 1910. The flag of Japan subsequently replaced the taegukgi as the national flag flown on the Korean Peninsula, and the taegukgi became a symbol of anti-Japanese resistance and Korean independence.

The Allies' victory in World War II in 1945 resulted in Japan relinquishing control over Korea and the peninsula being divided into two occupation zones. The Soviet Union occupied the northern half of Korea while the United States occupied the southern half. The taegukgi was widely used in both occupation zones, and it was not until 1947 that the Soviets began proposing a new flag to their Korean allies.

=== Creation ===
==== Official account ====
The design initially selected by Kim Il Sung, according to North Korean government sources

The North Korean government credits Kim Il Sung with designing the country's national flag. According to a Tongil News report of an article by the state-run Rodong Sinmun, Kim Il Sung began expressing the necessity of a new national flag and emblem in January 1948. He argued that they were important for future national affairs and would strengthen national pride. A team of artists was tasked with proposing designs for the new flag. Kim Il Sung initially chose a design similar to the flag that was adopted, except its width-to-length ratio was 2:3 and the white disc was in the center and did not feature a charge. In February 1948, Kim Il Sung instructed the artists to change the ratio to 1:2, to add a five-pointed red star to the inside of the disc, and to move the disc towards the hoist. The flag design was then accepted by the Constitutional Reform Committee and written into the provisional constitution on 20 February 1948 and confirmed by a special committee of the People's Assembly on 28 April. A ceremony was held on 10 July 1948 to take down the taegukgi and install the new flag in the meeting place, but the new flag's adoption was not official until the passing of North Korea's first constitution by the 1st Supreme People's Assembly on 8 September. The flag design was standardised with the passing of the national flag law on 22 October 1992.

Title page of On the Establishment of the New National Flag and the Abolition of the Taegukgi by Kim Tu-bong

The decision to change the national flag was relatively unpopular among politically active Koreans at the beginning. Lyuh Woon-hyung, for example, described the flag change as "not right". The Chondoist Chongu Party also criticised the new design and occasionally refused to participate in demonstrations under the flag. When the flag design in the provisional constitution was first read and debated, the representative Chong Chae-yong defended the taegukgi as a symbol of the Korean people's liberation, cherished by Koreans in both the north and south. Following the flag's approval by the People's Assembly in April 1948, Kim Tu-bong felt it necessary to defend the new flag and published a book on 20 August titled On the Establishment of the New National Flag and the Abolition of the Taegukgi. In it, he praises the new flag as a symbol of the country's future and discredits the design of the taegukgi as overly complex, unintelligible, and rooted in superstition.

The North Korean artist Kim Chu-gyong was originally credited by the North Korean government as the flag's designer. On the 30th anniversary of the founding of North Korea in 1978, he was given an award for designing the North Korean flag and emblem, and a book was published titled In the Embrace of Grace, which included some of his collected writings. He also wrote a detailed account of how he was ordered by Kim Il Sung to make the designs in November 1947, titled The Story of Our Country's National Emblem and National Flag.

==== Pak Il's account ====
Pak Il, a Soviet-Korean interpreter for the Soviet 25th Army, gave a different account of the flag's creation in two interviews, one to the Russian magazine Sovershenno Sekretno in 1992 and another to the South Korean newspaper The Dong-A Ilbo in 1993. According to Pak, the Soviets were responsible for proposing and designing the flag. In 1947, Soviet major general Nikolai Georgiyevich Lebedev summoned Kim Tu-bong to discuss whether the taegukgi should be retained by a newly-founded North Korea. Kim Tu-bong was in favour of keeping the taegukgi and attempted to explain to Lebedev the flag's significance within East Asian philosophy. Lebedev dismissed Kim Tu-bong's lecture as nonsense and superstition. A few months later, the Soviets sent a Russian-language document outlining their design to the 7th Department of the 25th Army. Pak was asked to translate it to Korean, and it eventually became the flag of North Korea. Pak's account of the flag's creation was corroborated by fellow Soviet-Korean Chŏng Sangjin, who held prominent positions in the North Korean culture and propaganda ministry.

== Notable uses ==
=== In North Korea ===
The North Korean flag is frequently used in state propaganda. For example, propaganda posters often include the national flag, but it is depicted less prominently than symbols of Juche, North Korea's state ideology attributed to Kim Il Sung. American scholar Carter Matherly argues that this is meant to symbolise national unity under the guidance of Juche. Massive North Korean flags are also displayed during the Arirang Mass Games in Pyongyang. One such display is made by thousands of people holding up coloured cards.

The North Korean village of Kijong-dong, near the Military Demarcation Line and within the Korean Demilitarized Zone, is the location of a 272-kilogram (600 lb) North Korean flag which flies from a 160-metre (525-foot) flagpole. It was constructed in response to the South Korean side's raising of a 136-kilogram (300 lb) flag on a 98-metre (323-foot) flagpole in Daeseong-dong.

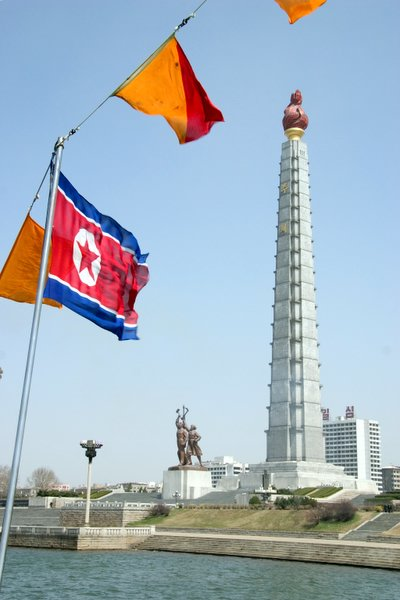
A North Korean flag flies near the Juche Tower in Pyongyang

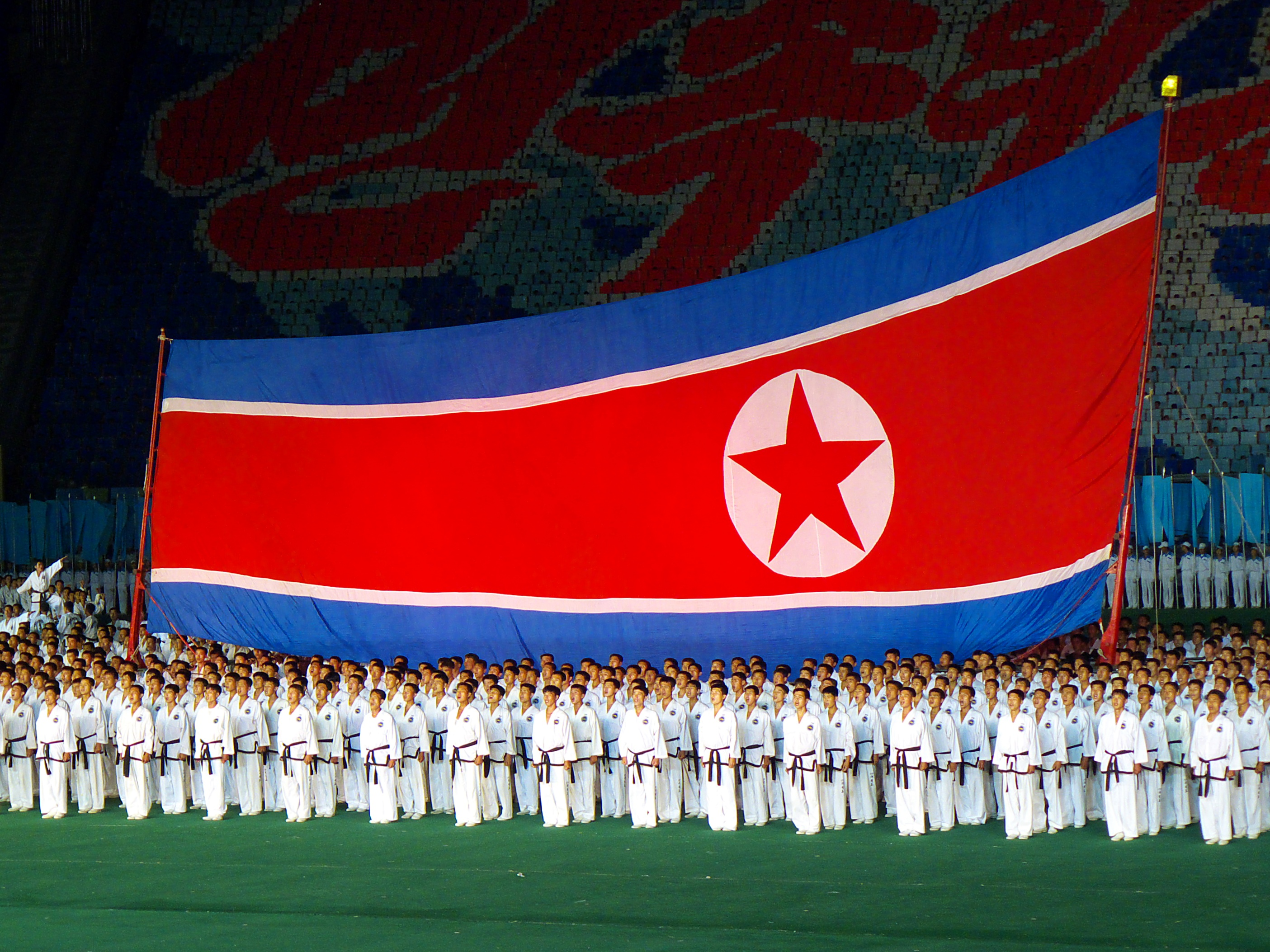
A massive North Korean flag at the Arirang Mass Games

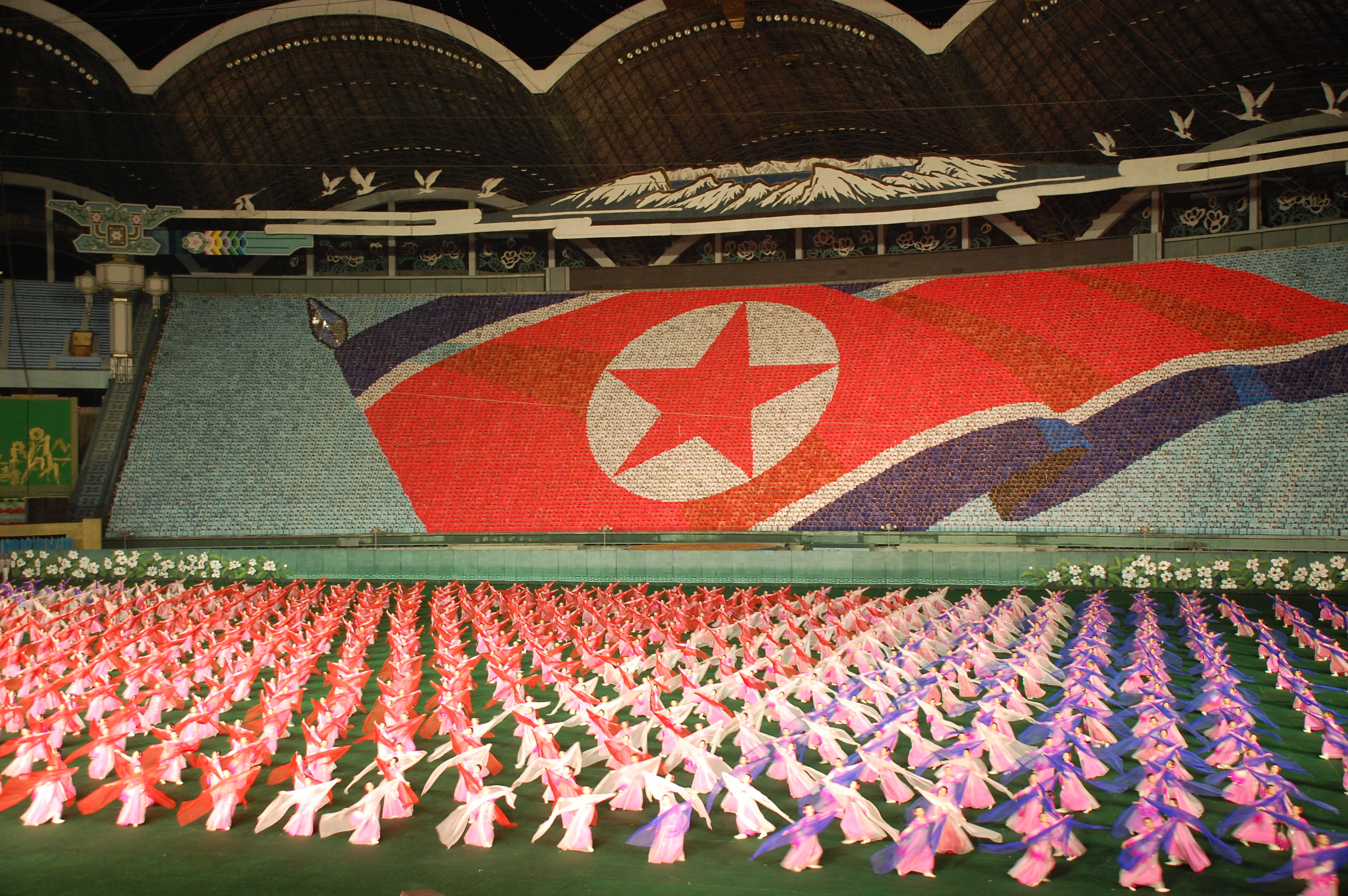
Thousands of people at the Arirang Mass Games form an image of the North Korean flag by holding up coloured cards

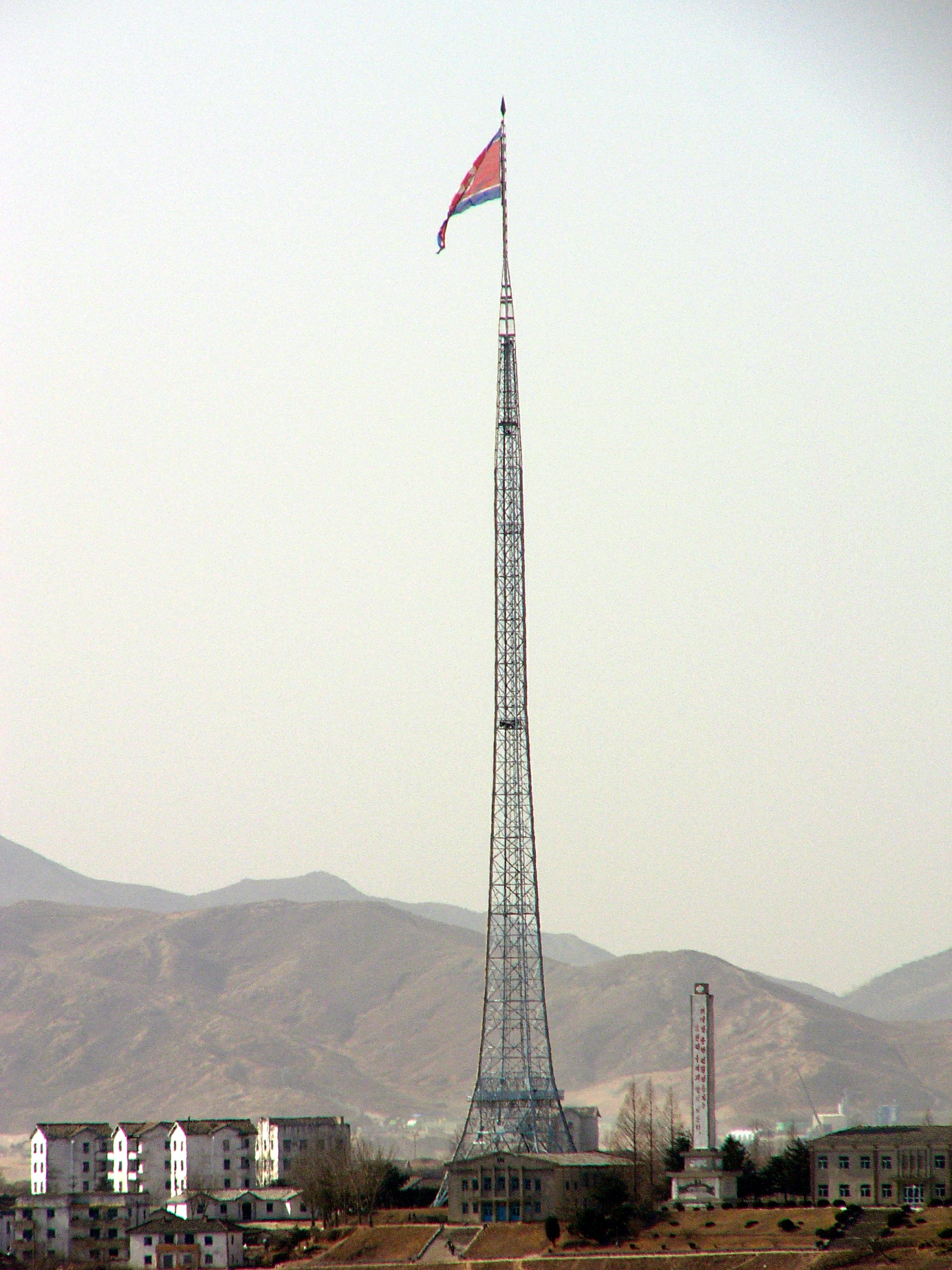
The North Korean flag flying on the 160-metre (525-foot) flagpole in Kijong-dong

=== In South Korea ===
It is illegal to carry or raise the North Korean flag in South Korea; the country's National Security Act prohibits actions that may be interpreted as pro-communist. However, exceptions have been made for film and television productions, as well as regional and international sports competitions. During the 2002 Asian Games in Busan, the North Korean flag was permitted to fly at five locations: the Busan Asian Games Organizing Committee, the event's main hotel, the press center, the athletes' village, and the conference room for representatives of participating countries. Nationals of all countries, including North Korea, were not permitted to carry North Korean flags. At the formal ceremonies of the 2014 Asian Games in Incheon, a volunteer raised the North Korean flag while every other competing country's flag was raised by a South Korean soldier. The North Korean flag was flown at event venues during the 2018 Winter Olympics in Pyeongchang as well. However, the North Korean flag was not raised at the Pyeongchang Olympic Village during a public welcoming ceremony for competing countries. Instead, it was raised at midnight, a day after the other competing countries' flags had already been raised. An official from the Pyeongchang Olympic Organizing Committee explained that the decision was made to avoid causing controversy over possibly violating the National Security Act. Anti-North Korea protesters burned the North Korean flag in front of the Olympic stadium hours before the games' opening ceremony.

=== Outside of Korea ===
The North Korean flag has been mistakenly used by a number of international organisations to represent South Korea. The organising committee of the 2003 Winter Universiade accidentally displayed the North Korean flag while explaining the accommodations for South Korean athletes. In 2008, the Asian Football Confederation used the North Korean flag in a post on its website about South Korea's previous hosting of the tournament. In 2023, the official website of the 28th Conference of the Parties to the United Nations Framework Convention on Climate Change displayed the North Korean flag for South Korea in its list of participants.

The North Korean flag has also been used to insult or mock South Koreans online. For example, South Korean taekwondo athlete Park Tae-joon's social media posts received numerous comments with North Korean flag emojis in them after he won gold at the 2024 Summer Olympics.

== See also ==
- Flag of South Korea
- Korean Unification Flag – Flag representing all of Korea
- List of Korean flags
- List of North Korean flags
- Order of the National Flag – Second highest order of North Korea
