= Korean Unification Flag =

Flag representing all of Korea

Korea
- Unification Flag, Flag of Korea
- Use: Other
- Proportion: 2∶3
- Adopted: 1991; 35 years ago
- Design: A white field charged in the center with a sky blue silhouette of the Korean Peninsula, Jeju Island, and Ulleungdo

- Unification Flag
- Hangul: 통일기
- Hanja: 統一旗
- RR: Tongilgi
- MR: T'ongilgi

Flag of the Korean Peninsula
- Hangul: 한반도기 / 조선반도기
- Hanja: 韓半島旗 / 朝鮮半島旗
- RR: Hanbandogi / Joseonbandogi
- MR: Hanbandogi / Chosŏnbandogi

The Korean Unification Flag (Korean: 통일기; lit. 'Unification Flag'), also known as the Flag of the Korean Peninsula (Korean: 한반도기 or 조선반도기), is a flag used to represent all of Korea. When North Korea and South Korea participate as one team at international sporting events, the flag is carried by the unified team. It was introduced at the 1990 Asian Games but was not used by a unified team until the 1991 World Table Tennis Championships. Outside of sports, the flag has been used, particularly in North Korea, to express support for Korean reunification.

The flag is a white field charged in the center with a sky blue silhouette of the Korean Peninsula, Jeju Island, and Ulleungdo. The flag's depiction of Korean territorial claims has earned it the chagrin of Japan, which also claims the Liancourt Rocks. The disputed islets were added to the flag in 2003 but removed in 2018 upon the request of the International Olympic Committee (IOC).

== Background and creation ==
Korea has been divided since the conclusion of World War II with the surrender of Japan on 15 August 1945. Exactly three years later, on 15 August 1948, the American-occupied south established the Republic of Korea, and the Soviet-occupied north followed suit with the proclamation of the Democratic People's Republic of Korea on 9 September. As separate sovereign states, North Korea and South Korea have since competed at international sporting events with their own teams, although they both claim to be the sole representative of the entire Korean Peninsula.

A detente in inter-Korean relations came during the 1990 Asian Games in Beijing, China, when both countries agreed to compete as a unified team. The "Unification Flag" was conceived amid logistical difficulties with simultaneously raising two flags (i.e. the flag of North Korea and the flag of South Korea). While the unified team effort was not realized, the flag was prominently displayed by an unofficial cheerleading group during the games. The flag made its official debut in 1991, when North Korea and South Korea competed together as a single team at the 41st World Table Tennis Championships in Chiba, Japan.

== Design ==
The current variation of the flag features a sky blue silhouette of the Korean Peninsula, Jeju Island, and Ulleungdo on a white background. The silhouette is a smoothened representation of the actual coastline and northern border with China. According to both Koreas, the shape of Korea is meant to be symbolic rather than precise, and several smaller islands such as Geojedo are visibly omitted. The agreement creating the flag explicitly excluded Korea's westernmost, southernmost, and easternmost islands: Maando, Marado, and Dokdo (Liancourt Rocks), respectively.

=== Variations ===
The original design of the flag featured only the Korean Peninsula and Jeju Island. Ulleungdo was added 2002 and the Liancourt Rocks were added in 2003. Socotra Rock was added to the flag around September 2006, after a dispute between South Korea and China over their exclusive economic zones.

Ulleungdo and the Liancourt Rocks were removed in an official capacity at the 2018 Winter Olympics and other events in 2018, following pressure from the IOC and Japan. The IOC told South Korea that including the Liancourt Rocks would be viewed as "a political act" and violate the IOC's neutrality, to which South Korea agreed. Japan allegedly pressured South Korea to officially remove Ulleungdo as well, citing the fact that it was not on the flag used in Chiba in 1990. Ulleungdo was added back in 2019.

South Korean government policy allows the use of the Liancourt Rocks variation during private events or by people acting in an unofficial capacity, such as cheerleaders. For example, in the 2018 Winter Olympics, the Liancourt Rocks variation was used on the women's ice hockey team's training uniforms, by the North Korean cheerleading groups during the opening ceremony, and during the team's evaluation match five days prior to the opening ceremony (which was hosted by the Korea Ice Hockey Association and not officially part of the Olympic schedule). Japan protested these uses. Additionally, the Liancourt Rocks variation appeared on the team's official uniforms four days before the opening ceremony; BBC reported that it was quickly removed following media attention, while Yonhap News Agency reported that it was not removed until just before the athletes entered the opening ceremony.

Korean Peninsula and Jeju Island

Korean Peninsula, Jeju Island, and Ulleungdo

Korean Peninsula, Jeju Island, Ulleungdo, and the Liancourt Rocks

== Usage ==
=== In sporting events ===
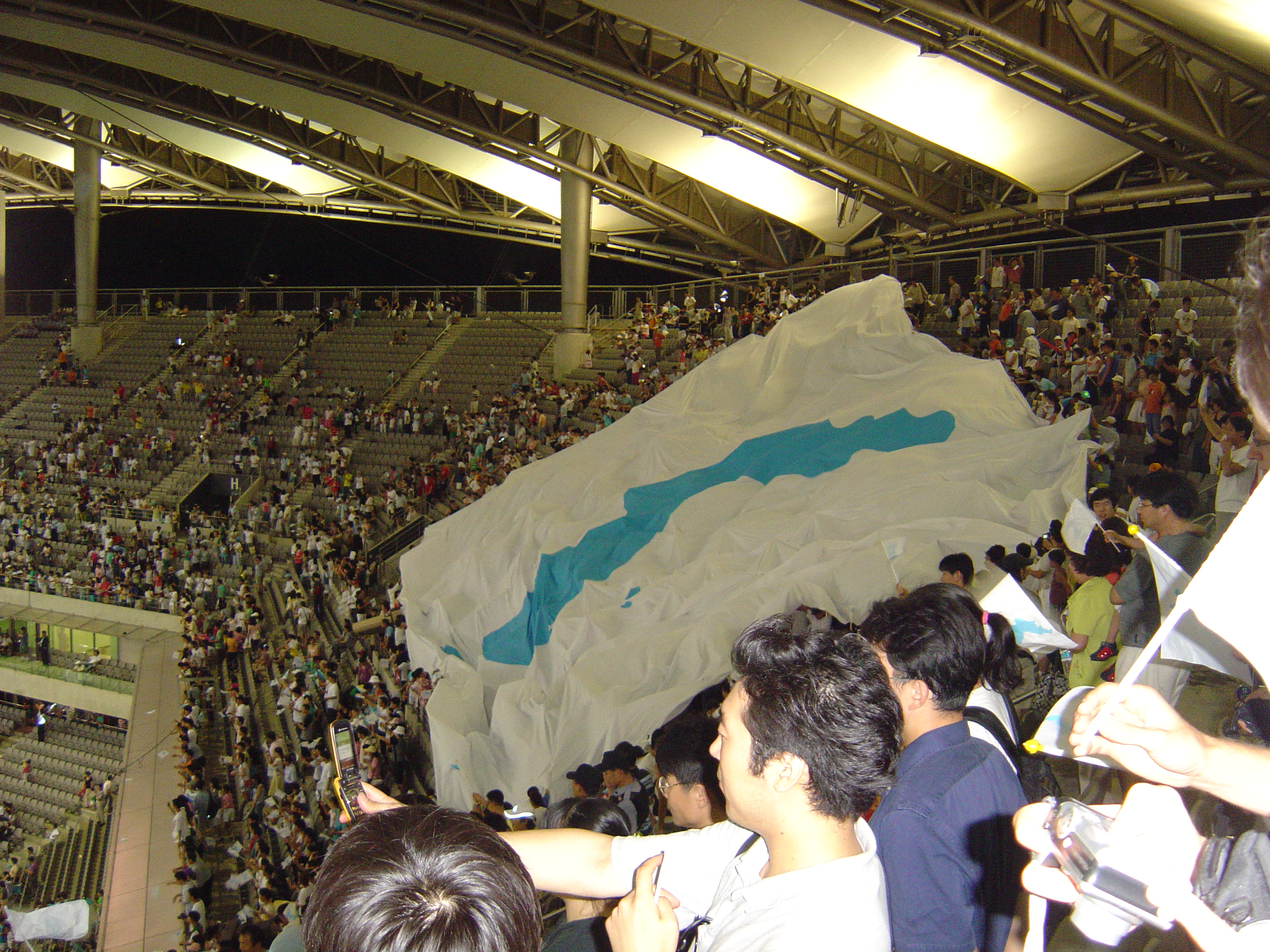
Flag at the Seoul World Cup Stadium 2005

The Korean Unification Flag has been officially used at several international events, either for a unified team, or for when the two teams march together in the opening ceremony while competing separately. In addition to international events, inter-Korean sporting events have used the Unification Flag.

At the 1990 Asian Games in Beijing and the 2005 Asian Athletics Championships in Incheon, South Korea, unofficial cheerleading groups also prominently displayed the flag.

The flag was not used in the 2008 Summer Olympics in Beijing, China. Not only was a unified team shelved, but the Beijing Organizing Committee for the Olympic Games (BOCOG)'s plan to make the two Korean teams enter consecutively during the opening ceremony was rejected due to opposition by the North Korean delegation at the last moment.

During the 2018 Winter Paralympics, negotiations were stalled by North Korean officials requesting that the Liancourt Rocks be included on the flag.

Official usage in international sports
Event	Location	Usage	Ulleungdo	Liancourt Rocks	Socotra Rock	Ref
1991 World Table Tennis Championships	Chiba, Japan	Unified team				
1991 FIFA World Youth Championship	Lisbon, Portugal	Unified team				
2000 Summer Olympics	Sydney, Australia	Opening ceremony				
2002 Asian Games	Busan, South Korea	Opening ceremony				
2003 Asian Winter Games	Aomori, Japan	Opening ceremony				
2003 Summer Universiade	Daegu, South Korea	Opening ceremony	?	?		
2004 Summer Olympics	Athens, Greece	Opening ceremony				
2005 East Asian Games	Macau	Opening ceremony				
2006 Winter Olympics	Turin, Italy	Opening ceremony				
2006 Asian Games	Doha, Qatar	Opening ceremony				
2007 Asian Winter Games	Changchun, China	Opening ceremony			?	
2018 Winter Olympics	Pyeongchang, South Korea	Unified team				
2018 World Team Table Tennis Championships	Halmstad, Sweden	Unified team				
2018 Korea Open	Daejeon, South Korea	Unified team				
2018 Asian Games	Jakarta and Palembang, Indonesia	Unified team				
2018 Asian Para Games	Jakarta, Indonesia	Unified team				
2019 World Men's Handball Championship	Germany and Denmark	Unified team				

=== In political contexts ===
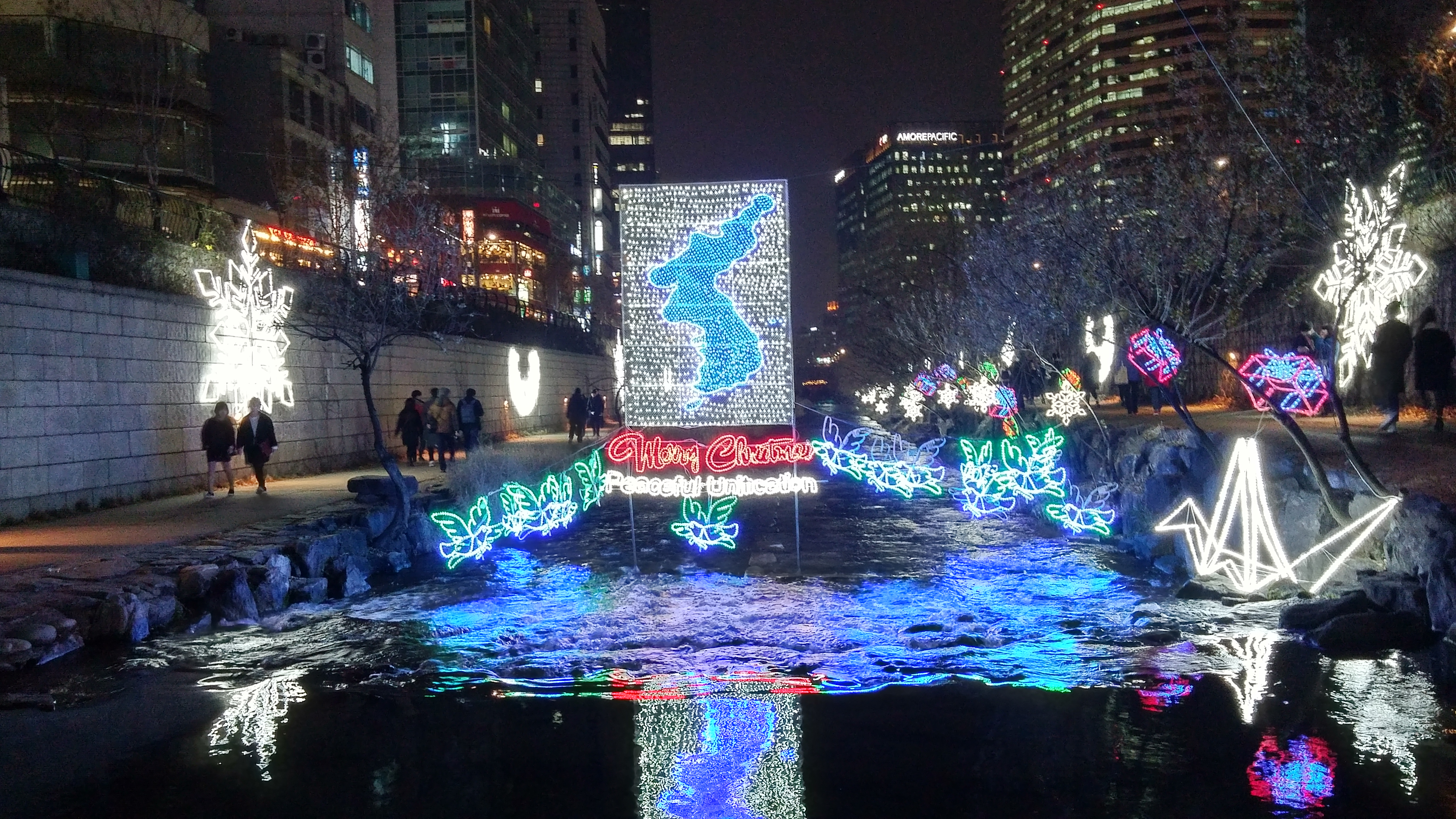
Flag at the Seoul Christmas Festival 2015

According to American Koreanist Brian Reynolds Myers, North Korea and South Korea view the flag in different political contexts. South Koreans view the flag as representing a peaceful relationship and coexistence with North Korea, whereas North Koreans view it as representing a desire to have Korea reunited under the leadership of the North Korean government.

== See also ==
- List of Korean flags
- Chinese Taipei Olympic flag
