= Tongil News =

South Korean online newspaper

- Format: Internet newspaper
- Founded: October 31, 2000
- Language: Korean
- Country: South Korea
- Website: https://www.tongilnews.com/

Tongil News (Korean: 통일뉴스) is a South Korean Korean-language online newspaper that was established on October 31, 2000. The paper's founders were reportedly politically progressive figures in South Korea, with the paper focusing on issues related to the unification of North and South Korea. The paper's staff reportedly advocated for warm relations with North Korea in 2001.
