= Government Complex No. 1 (Pyongyang) =

North Korean government headquarters

- Interactive map of the Government Complex No. 1 area

General information
- Status: Gated Community
- Type: Closed buildings' complex
- Location: Chung-guyok, Pyongyang, North Korea
- Coordinates: 39°01′04″N 125°44′39″E
- Current tenants: Workers' Party of Korea; State Affairs Commission
- Owner: North Korean government

Korean name
- Hangul: 1호 청사
- Hanja: 1號 廳舍
- RR: 1ho cheongsa
- MR: 1ho ch'ŏngsa

Government Complex No. 1 (Korean: 1호 청사) is a closed complex of government buildings located at the center of Pyongyang, the capital of North Korea. It houses the headquarters of the Central Committee of the Workers' Party of Korea and the State Affairs Commission, the country's ruling party and supreme state organ, respectively, as well as the private offices of Supreme Leader Kim Jong Un.

== Overview ==
The complex is situated roughly between Somun, Changgwang, Chollima and Haebangsan streets. It include administrative buildings as well as mansions and luxury residences for high dignitaries of the regime and government members (such as Residence No. 15). The entire complex is surrounded by a wall. Colin Zwirko of NK News describes the complex as "Pyongyang's Forbidden City" because of its secure nature.

The complex includes the seat of the secretariat and the central meeting hall of the Workers' Party of Korea. It was reported in October 2019 that many high-rise windows facing the complex had been blocked out for security. The complex saw large construction activity in 2019. Satellite images showed construction activity between February and April 2020. An old building that was thought to be the private clinic of the North Korean leadership had been torn down and construction had begun on a new, larger building with multiple rooms.
