= Overrun Countries series =

Commemorative postage stamp series, issued 1943-1944

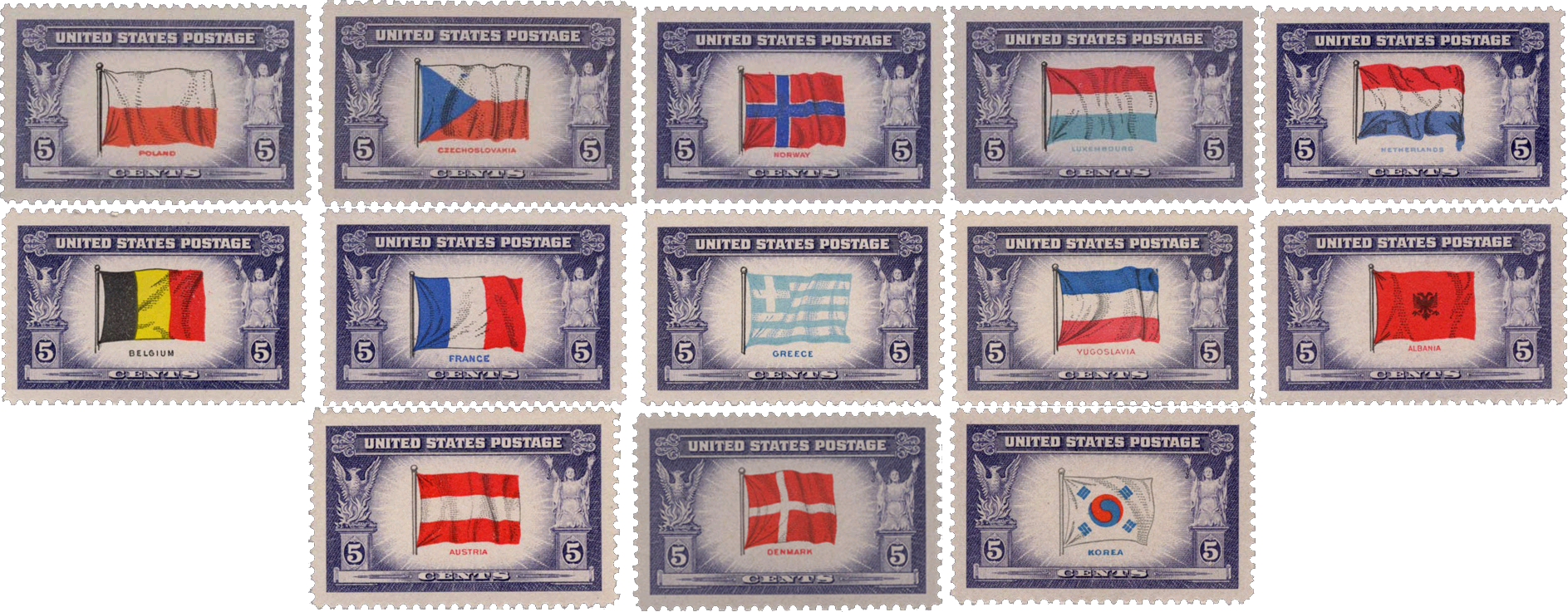
Overrun Countries stamps

Belgium flag stamp

The Overrun Countries series was a series of thirteen commemorative postage stamps, each of five-cent denomination, issued by the United States over a fifteen-month period in 1943 and 1944 as a tribute to thirteen nations overrun, occupied, and/or annexed by the Axis powers during or shortly before World War II.

The stamps depict, in full color, the national flags of Poland, Czechoslovakia, Norway, Luxembourg, the Netherlands, Belgium, France, Greece, Yugoslavia, Albania, Austria, Denmark, and the former Korean Empire, with the names of the respective countries underneath. To the left of each flag appears the symbol of a phoenix, symbolizing the renewal of life, and to its right appears a kneeling female figure with arms raised, breaking the shackles of servitude.

The stamps with flags of European countries were released at intervals from June to December 1943, while the Korea flag stamp was released in November 1944. The dates on which these stamps were issued are: Poland, 22 June 1943; Czechoslovakia, 12 July 1943; Norway, 27 July 1943; Luxembourg, 10 August 1943; the Netherlands, 23 August 1943; Belgium, 14 September 1943; France, 28 September 1943; Greece, 12 October 1943; Yugoslavia, 26 October 1943; Albania, 9 November 1943; Austria, 23 November 1943; Denmark, 7 December 1943; and Korea, 2 November 1944.

Because of the elaborate process necessary for the full-color printing, the United States government's Bureau of Engraving and Printing in Washington, D.C., contracted with a private firm, the American Bank Note Company in New York City, to produce the stamps.

The Scott number for this series of stamps is from 909 to 921.

== See also ==
- Postage stamps and postal history of the United States
- Champion of Liberty commemorative stamps
- Captive Nations
