= Drug use in music =

Overview of drug use concerning music

Drug use in music has been a topic of discussion and debate since at least the 1930s, if not earlier. As stated in the old saying "wine, women and song", association of music with using various substances go back centuries. References to recreational drug use in various forms have been common as the modern record industry developed, particularly in terms of popular music genres such as pop rock singles, dance releases, and the like. Social, cultural, legal, and economic challenges to the existence of music referring to recreational drugs have prompted several studies on the link between such references and increased usage among teens and young adults. Findings over multiple decades have had mixed results. Many complicating factors exist; in particular, a song that describes substance abuse in a depressive, emotionally blank fashion may trigger curiosity for one listener as well as revulsion for another. Sporadic calls for music censorship in different countries over the past decades have also had vastly different outcomes.

Multiple musical artists have attracted a public image associated with neutral to positive depictions of drug use in their releases, while others have created works with negative depictions of drug use that condemn individuals such as dealers and suppliers. These issues cut across lines of nationality, age, race, gender, and musical genre, with contrasting examples such as hard rocker Pete Townshend of The Who (labeling irresponsible musical artists who defy their fans and embrace materialistic drug use as "decadent assholes") as well as dance pop star Miley Cyrus (being openly frank about her embrace of cocaine and MDMA usage) both getting press attention for their views. As well, some artists argue that popular interpretations of their work misunderstand the intent, such as country and folk star John Denver having to persuade critics against hearing hidden innuendo in his hit song "Rocky Mountain High".

== History ==
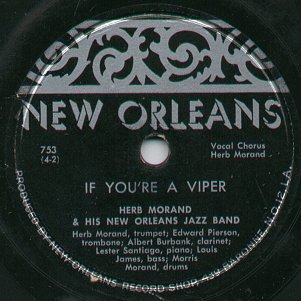
Artist Herb Morand was just one of the several musicians in the 1930s and 1940s to record Reefer Songs prominently based around cannabis, with this shellac record featuring his version of "If You're a Viper".

Some prominent songs referred to recreational drug use back into even the 1930s. For instance, the W.C. Fields vehicle International House, a bawdy comedy film released in 1933, featured Cab Calloway doing the tune "Reefer Man". The fact that many jazz and swing music artists were frank with each other about cannabis usage, touching on the matter even in song lyrics, attracted critical attention at the time. Well known music magazine Radio Stars printed a sensationalist article in 1938 by journalist Jack Hanley titled "Exposing the Marijuana Drug Evil in Swing Bands". Hanley recounted, "One leader told me of a young man in his band who was a crackerjack musician, but who used the weed so consistently that he was quite undependable. The fits of deep depression reefers so often, [sic] produce would seize him until he had to be restrained, [sic] from suicide." The track "If You're a Viper", composed by Stuff Smith and first recorded by his group in 1936, provides another example of the few tracks that made things deeply explicit before the 1960s.

In the midst of the Vietnam War and the massive social movements shifting the U.S. cultural ground in the 1950s and 1960s, evolution continued as more and more music began being produced that sent heavily controversial messages. Traditionalist-minded individuals expressed outrage at the commercial success of tracks with anti-war slants, with frank discussions of teenage lust, and the like. As stated by a Cumberland University produced study on the matter, "It was not until the aftermath of the sixties youth counterculture ... that drug lyrics became a recurring musical motif."

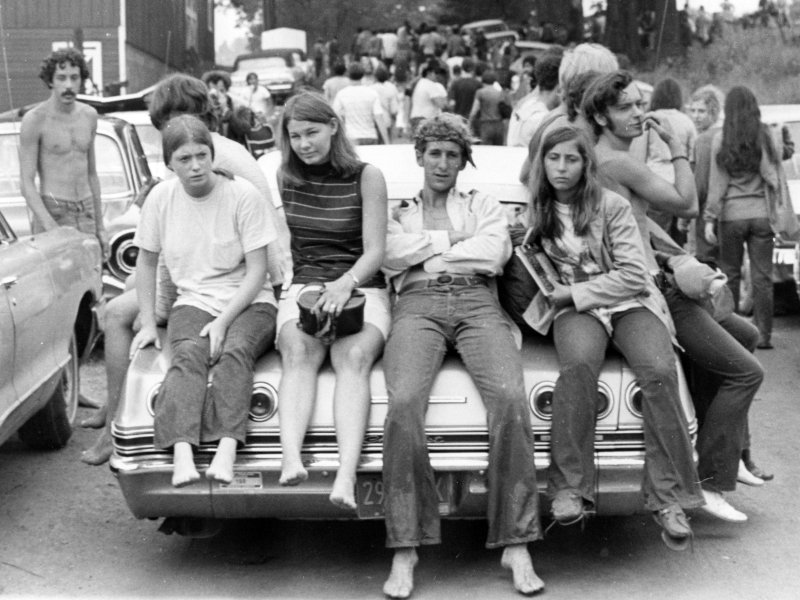
Young people in the 1969 Woodstock festival, where psychedelic rock trends climaxed and the major psychedelic acts performed, including Jimi Hendrix, Janis Joplin and Santana.

References to drugs can be found most abundantly in multiple types of music during the 1960s and 1970s. The new subgenre of pop and rock known as psychedelic music started becoming completely mainstream during the former decade. After 1966, with the release of The Beatles' album Revolver, regular audiences embraced eccentric sounds such as those in the song "Tomorrow Never Knows". As well, group The Beach Boys' Pet Sounds and The Byrds' various singles, particularly "Eight Miles High", also made the drug-influenced style an integral part of popularly known, mainstream commercial music made by American bands. Things were rapidly changing as many more musical outfits filtered in and out into the American mass media, styles later regarded as garage rock, proto-powerpop, and proto-punk achieved sporadic interest. Concept albums in which drug references existed within song after song such as Sgt. Pepper's Lonely Hearts Club Band (also by The Beatles) and Tommy (by The Who) became popular, and the broader counterculture itself evolved in different, changing ways as the sixties went on. Drugs became much more common and easier to obtain in terms of mass production, and other, even newer subgenres of music such as acid rock picked up acclaim due to efforts by groups such as Cream (band), Jimi Hendrix Experience, The Doors, and the Grateful Dead. Mass media evolved to the point that having references to drug use in songs became so common as to be considered 'normal'.

The late-60s in particular became labeled as a "sensory blizzard" due to the imagery and sound explored by multiple bands. As a specific example, rock band Small Faces ended up getting away with releasing two large scale singles with explicit drug references, "Here Come the Nice" and "Itchycoo Park", that proved to be two of their most iconic hits. "Itchycoo Park" functioned as arguably 1967's 'song of the summer' in the UK. That bureaucracies such as the BBC allowed radio airplay for as many experimentally minded songs as they did surprised many. The Beatles, widely regarded as the greatest and most influential pop and rock group in modern history, drew influence from its members drug usage and made copious references to the fact in their music. In 1972, band member John Lennon remarked that "Rubber Soul was the pot album and Revolver was the acid."

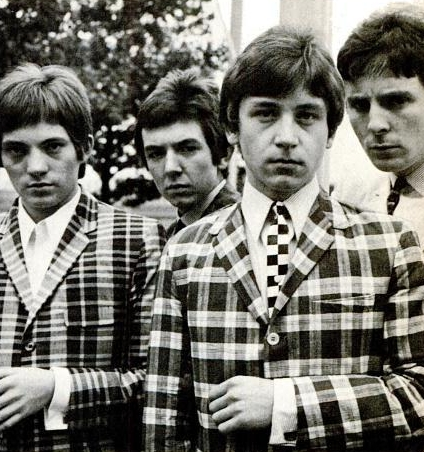
Seminal British rock group Small Faces, pictured in 1965, achieved notoriety for the frankness of the drug references in their singles such as "Here Come the Nice".

Beatles' songs directly taking influence from the band members' drug habits at the time include "Day Tripper", "Got to Get You into My Life", and "Lucy in the Sky with Diamonds", among others. The lyrical content and tone varies much between the group's many songs, and some records feature complex meanings beyond being just 'anti-drugs' or 'pro-drugs'. For example, 1965's "Day Tripper" focuses lyrically on criticizing a woman who's "taking the easy way out" of her life's troubles and is "a big teaser" while musically being an upbeat, poppy track. Songwriters John Lennon and Paul McCartney later commented that the record criticized "weekend hippies" from their then position of being "full-time trippers" committed to using drugs experimentally.

Eventually, however, the deaths of prominent musical artists such as Jimi Hendrix, Brian Jones, Janis Joplin, and Jim Morrison, all of which who had their own substance dependence as a direct contributor to their deaths, help contribute to anti-drug messages becoming more prominent in popular music. While many artists still criticized drug prohibition as well as other matters of government social policy, the toll taken in people's personal lives through addiction caused multiple songwriters to portray dealing and usage in more of a condemning, negative fashion. Despite its band members' highly publicized dalliances with illegal drugs, the group The Rolling Stones in particular created several songs with a negative tone to them regarding drugs after the death of Brian Jones such as 1971's "Sister Morphine", a track in which an individual is described surviving a terrible car crash, asking for morphine, and sadly dying from his injuries.

During the development of hip-hop music and related genres that were then avant-garde, such as songs by electro artists, many DJs and MCs felt a strong desire to touch on real-life issues among their listeners, particularly discussing matters such as street violence, drug use, and economic inequality. Fans in the African-American and Hispanic-American communities in particular often appreciated the honesty and frankness even as it made the music controversial. Politically-themed tracks and other protest songs during the old school hip-hop era frequently condemned "dealers", "pushers", and the like for contributing to holding young people back. One example is the Grandmaster Flash and The Furious Five track "The Message", which includes the lyrics: "You'll admire all the number-book takers, thugs, pimps and pushers and the big money-makers ... [b]ut now your eyes sing the sad, sad song of how you lived so fast and died so young". The song came out in 1982.

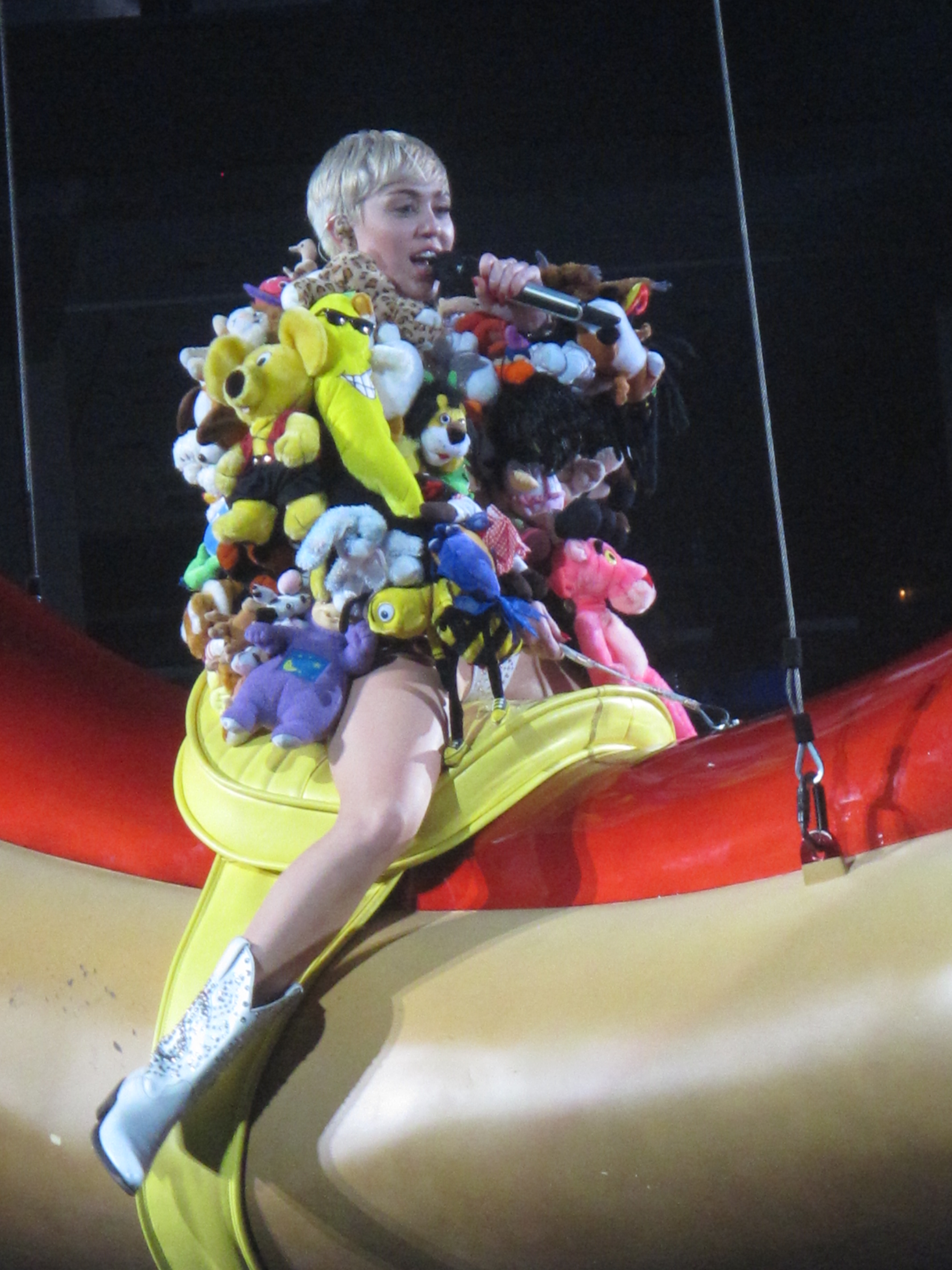
Pop star Miley Cyrus, pictured in 2014, is known for referencing the use of cannabis, cocaine, and MDMA in her lyrics.

In the mid-2010s, MDMA was frequently referred to popular music, specially "molly", a purportedly purified version of the drug. This coincided with the rising popularity of electronic dance music, which had developed a drug culture around MDMA and LSD since the Second Summer of Love of 1988–89. Examples include hits "We Can't Stop" by Miley Cyrus (which also references cocaine use), "Diamonds" by Rihanna, and Madonna's album MDNA, whose title refers to the drug. Hip hop artists such as 2 Chainz, Trinidad James, Rick Ross, Kanye West, and Jay-Z have all referenced "molly" in their music. Multiple media outlets, including The Guardian, The Huffington Post, and Fox News, reported on the increasing mentions of the drug in mass-marketed music in 2013.

Starting in the 1990s, the drug lean, also known as "purple drank" or "sizzurp", became prominent in hip-hop culture, emerging from southern cities such as Houston and Memphis. Figures such as DJ Screw and UGK helped popularize the drug in hip-hop with their signature "chopped and screwed" sound, a hazy, distorted style of music that reflected the effects of lean. Examples of songs that mention lean include "Sippin' on Some Sizzurp" by Three 6 Mafia, "Codeine Crazy" by Future, and "Purple Stuff" by Big Moe. The rising prominence of lean in hip-hop culture has been cited as problematic, with many artists such as DJ Screw, Pimp C, and Big Moe passing from causes related to lean consumption.

Rapper Rick Ross' comments in the song "U.O.E.N.O.", in which he describes spiking a woman's champagne with illegal drugs and then taking her back to his home for sex without her consent, created enough of a public outcry that the artist publicly apologized. However, pressure on the company Reebok continued, and it decided to terminate its marketing deal with Ross in April 2013. An estimated $3.5-5 million loss occurred for the entertainer.

In terms of the rest of the 2010s, music journalists such as Jason Lipshutz of Billboard have commented that references to illegal drugs remain a highly common topic in mainstream music. He remarked in October 2015 that beyond just the "loads of modern hip-hop hits linger[ing] on hard drug use and addiction" there is "an interesting trend" developing in terms of "the population of pop songs that don't just passively nod to drug use, but make it their lyrical focal point." He wrote, "In some ways, popular music hasn't been this high since the late 60's, when the Beatles, the Doors and Janis Joplin were turning their trips into hit records." Singer-songwriter Abel Tesfaye, known professionally as The Weeknd, is an example given the popularity of his songs such as "Can't Feel My Face" and "Kiss Land".

== Arguments from musicians about drug use ==
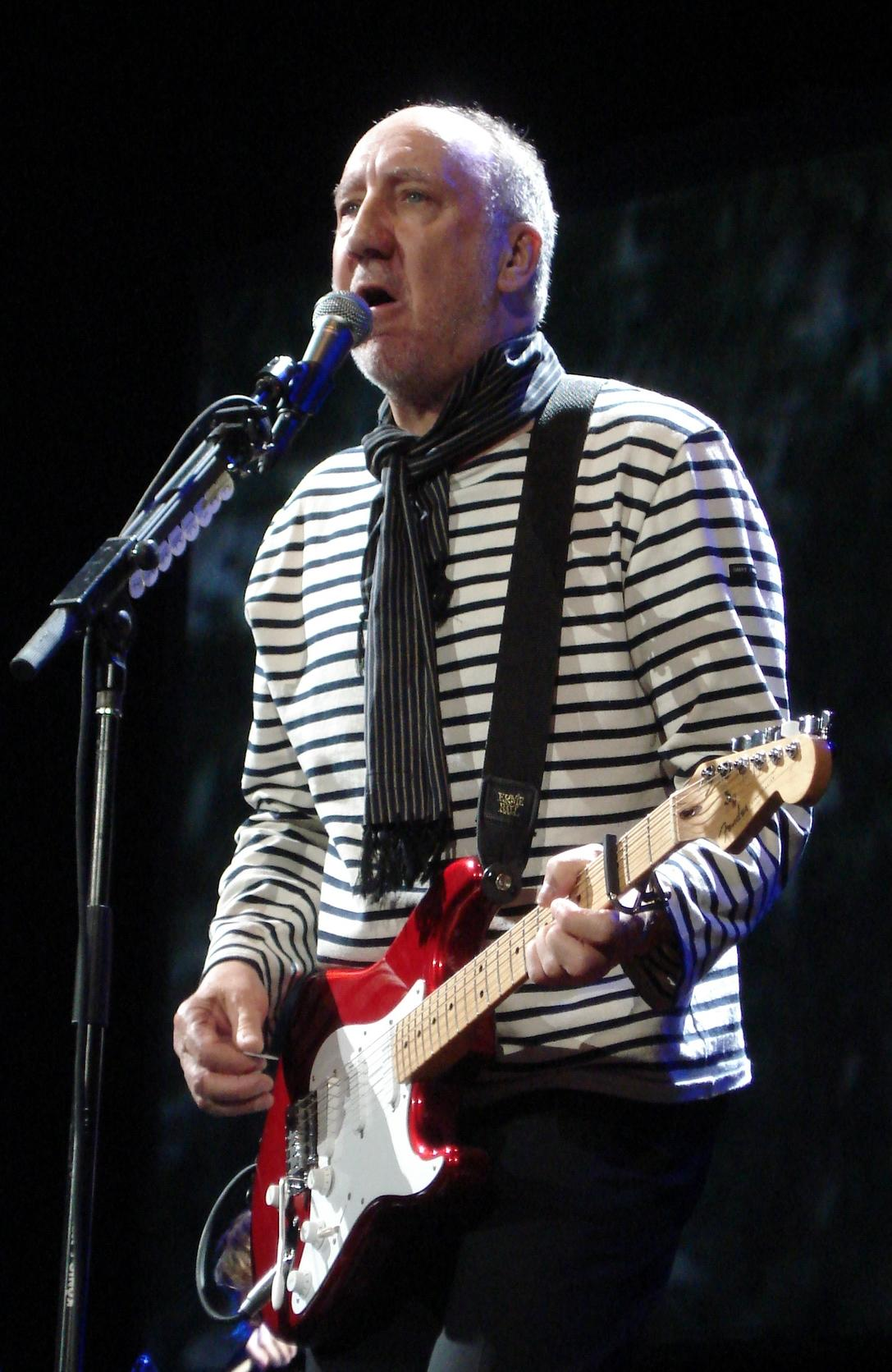
The Who's Pete Townshend, pictured in 2008, has taken a public stance against glorifiying of drug use, remarking that fans want artists they like to avoid being "decadent assholes".

Instances of individual musicians speaking out, outside of their specific songs, exist in many cases. Writing in the liner notes of his Songs in the Attic album, for example, American pop/rock artist Billy Joel highlighted the anti-drug message of his track "Captain Jack". Joel specifically remarked: "... so many friends shoveled under the Long Island dirt. The miracle of modern chemistry killed them if Vietnam didn't." In contrast, one example of a public figure who unapologetically advocates for drug use and evangelizes for various substances is pop star Miley Cyrus. Beyond just what she's sang in her music, she's stated publicly that she supports the consumption of "happy drugs" such as cannabis and MDMA. She's remarked, "They make you want to be with friends." Performer Madonna has also claimed while appearing on The Tonight Show that MDMA provides "euphoric feelings of love" and defended making references to it.

British musician Pete Townshend, best known for his work as guitarist and songwriter for band The Who, has gone beyond merely going public with his own struggles in terms of alcoholism and prescription drug troubles (nearly dying from alcohol poisoning) to make campaigning for the cause of drug rehabilitation a life's goal. He has repeatedly taken an anti-drug stance in many press interviews over the years, being known for expressing painfully honest opinions. The British government, in his opinion, even co-opted him into a Figurehead-type role for a time as part of a specific state anti-heroin crusade; he commented on the matter yet found his high profile useful for actually getting things done.

In June 1982, Townshend spoke with the magazine Rolling Stone about breaking with stereotypical musician lifestyles, saying:

"I always felt and hoped that it was possible. I've always felt that one more rock casualty is just another headline for a couple of weeks, and then everybody gets really ... not only bored, but everybody feels betrayed. Because although rock casualties make good copy in the NME Book of the Dead, they don't make good copy in the lives of rock fans, who have a slightly higher emotional involvement in the musical form than its just being, you know, like a circus, full of Berlinesque, decadent assholes who don't know how to spend their money, et cetera.

Singer-songwriter John Lennon, best known as a member of The Beatles, publicly made a variety of statements about illegal drugs during his lifetime; he sometimes confessed to using substances even while feeling like he shouldn't have the urge to. In 1970, Lennon remarked to Rolling Stone, "I've always needed a drug to survive." He added that just getting through life meant he "always took more pills and more of everything" compared to his former fellow band members, lamenting that he felt that way "'cause I'm more crazy." "The drugs are to prevent the rest of the world from crowding in on you," he said in 1972.

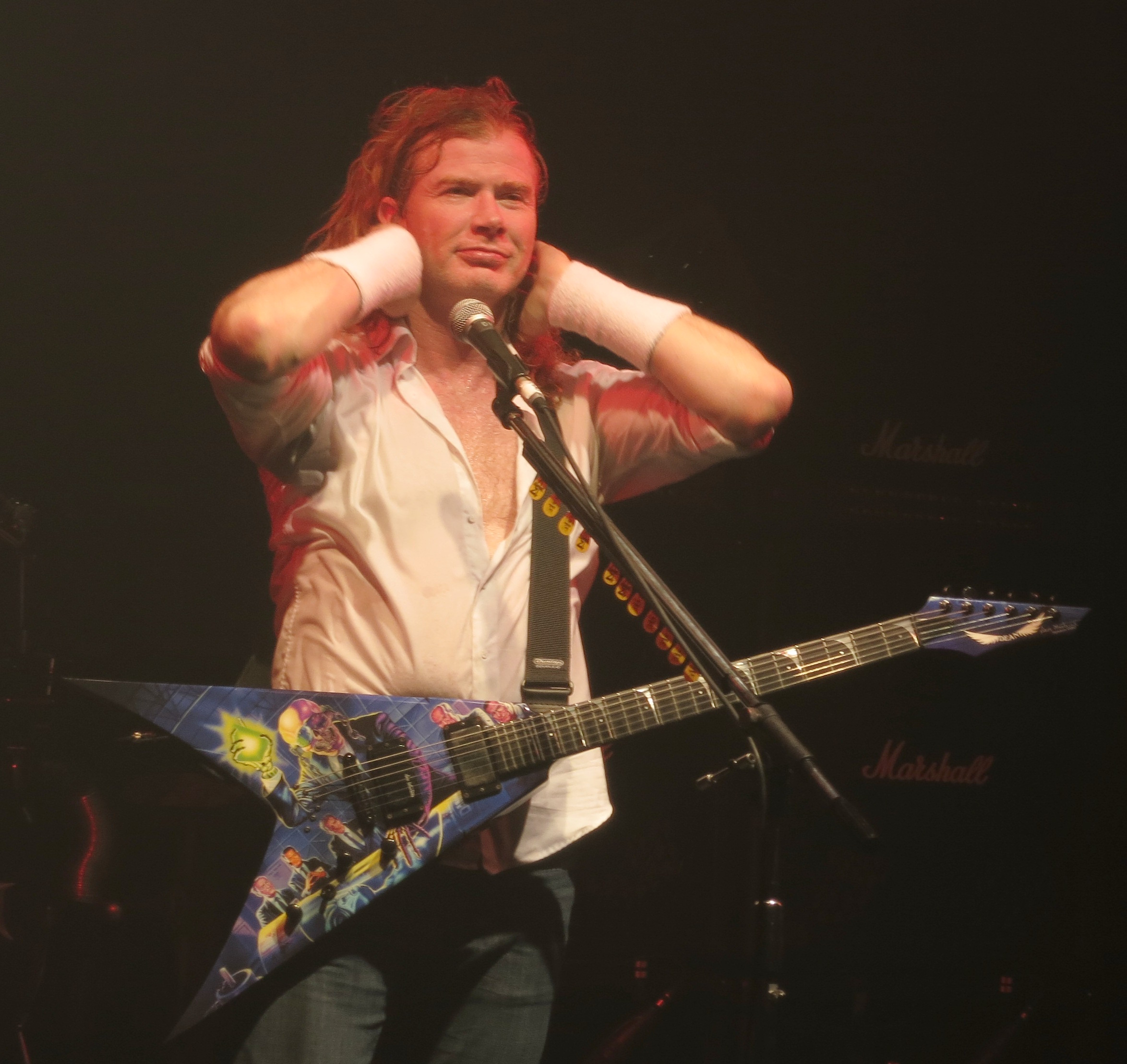
Megadeth's Dave Mustaine, pictured in 2012, has argued that "drugs, money or women have ruined every band in existence", saying that drug-related issues nearly wiped out his group.

Members of seminal heavy metal bands Metallica and Megadeth have created a variety of tracks portraying drug use negatively and have also discussed that problems in their past involving substance dependence have personally held them back. In February 2015, ex-Metallica member and central Megadeth figure Dave Mustaine remarked that "if you look at history, drugs, money or women have ruined every band in existence" and said that his own group nearly tore itself apart on those terms, Mustaine stating how "there was a period for a very long time that the band, everybody had their own drug of choice, because that's how it was back then". "Master of Puppets", the only single from the Metallica album of the same name, functions as what band frontman James Hetfield has viewed as a warning about drug abuse. In an interview in 1988, Hetfield stated that "Master of Puppets" shows specifically: "How things get switched around, instead of you controlling what you're taking and doing, it's drugs controlling you." While he and Kirk Hammett also said that they did not want to be seen as having an "anti-drug band" per se, directly telling people what to do or not do, they argued that personally witnessing drug abuse had affected them deeply. Dealing with past issues involving various forms of addiction (with Metallica having garnered the nickname 'Alcoholica' in their most addled days during the 1980s) constitutes major element of the popular documentary film Metallica: Some Kind of Monster; the movie features both the aforementioned Hetfield and Mustaine and depicts the former's efforts at psychological therapy.

== Discussions and debates about songs referencing drug use ==
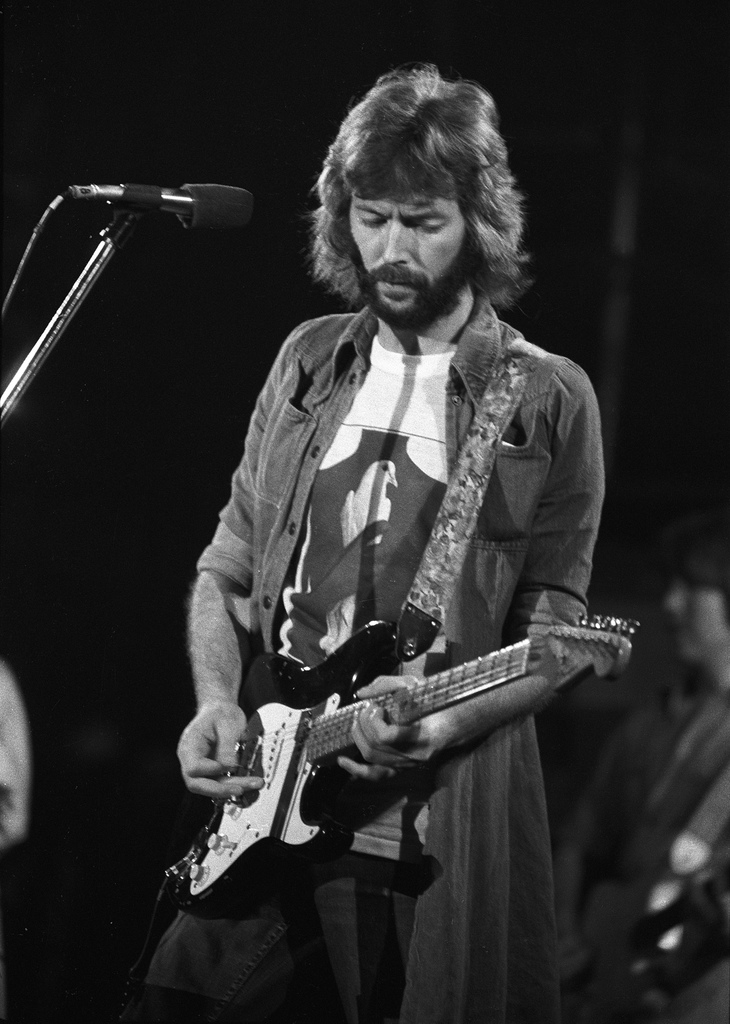
The song "Cocaine", a direct and explicit condemnation of the drug, remains one of rocker Eric Clapton's best known and most popular tunes.

There are a great number of songs which are very commonly known for hints towards drug use in the lyrics. However, a very large number of tracks also do so in a very direct fashion. Some songs, such as "Because I Got High" by Afroman, "Blunt Blowin'" by Lil Wayne, and "I Need Drugs" by Necro, plainly state even by the title alone that the song references drugs. Both music portraying drug use in a positive and music doing so negative light have been commercially successful over the past several decades; lyrical context will vary widely sometimes even in different songs by the same musician. The aforementioned hip-hop track "Because I Got High", for example, includes lyrics specifically focusing (albeit in a deliberately comical fashion) on the negatives of drug use. The official music video shows the rapper going through various misfortunes, with him even ending up saying: "I messed up my entire life, because I got high". Afroman is known as the 'Michael Jordan of Marijuana' by music critics.

Clear-cut examples of warning songs directly against illegal drug use include Grandmaster Melle Mel's popular rap-funk hybrid "White Lines (Don't Don't Do It)", which from the title itself (although featuring a double negative) to the details mentioned in the lyrics explicitly caution the listener to avoid the cocaine addiction associated with the 'high-life' of the times. Rock music and its related subgenres have featured a number of warning songs such as Neil Young's "The Needle and the Damage Done" and J.J. Cale's "Cocaine", the latter composition being best known for its Eric Clapton versions. Despite explicit, condemnatory lyrics, including: "If you want to get down, get down on the ground, cocaine", the track features a musically energetic, upbeat sound and has long been a staple of Clapton's live performances.

"The Needle and the Damage Done" is believed to be written mostly about Young-associate Danny Whitten, a guitarist who in fact died of a drug overdose at the age of only twenty-nine just months after the song's release. The acclaimed track has appeared in many of the artist's live performances and also in later studio re-releases of Young's material. The lyrics of "The Needle and the Damage Done" discuss things explicitly as well, notably including the line: "every junkie's like a settin' sun". The song has been labeled as "an effective account of the horrors of addiction" that provides "a powerful cautionary statement" in music history.

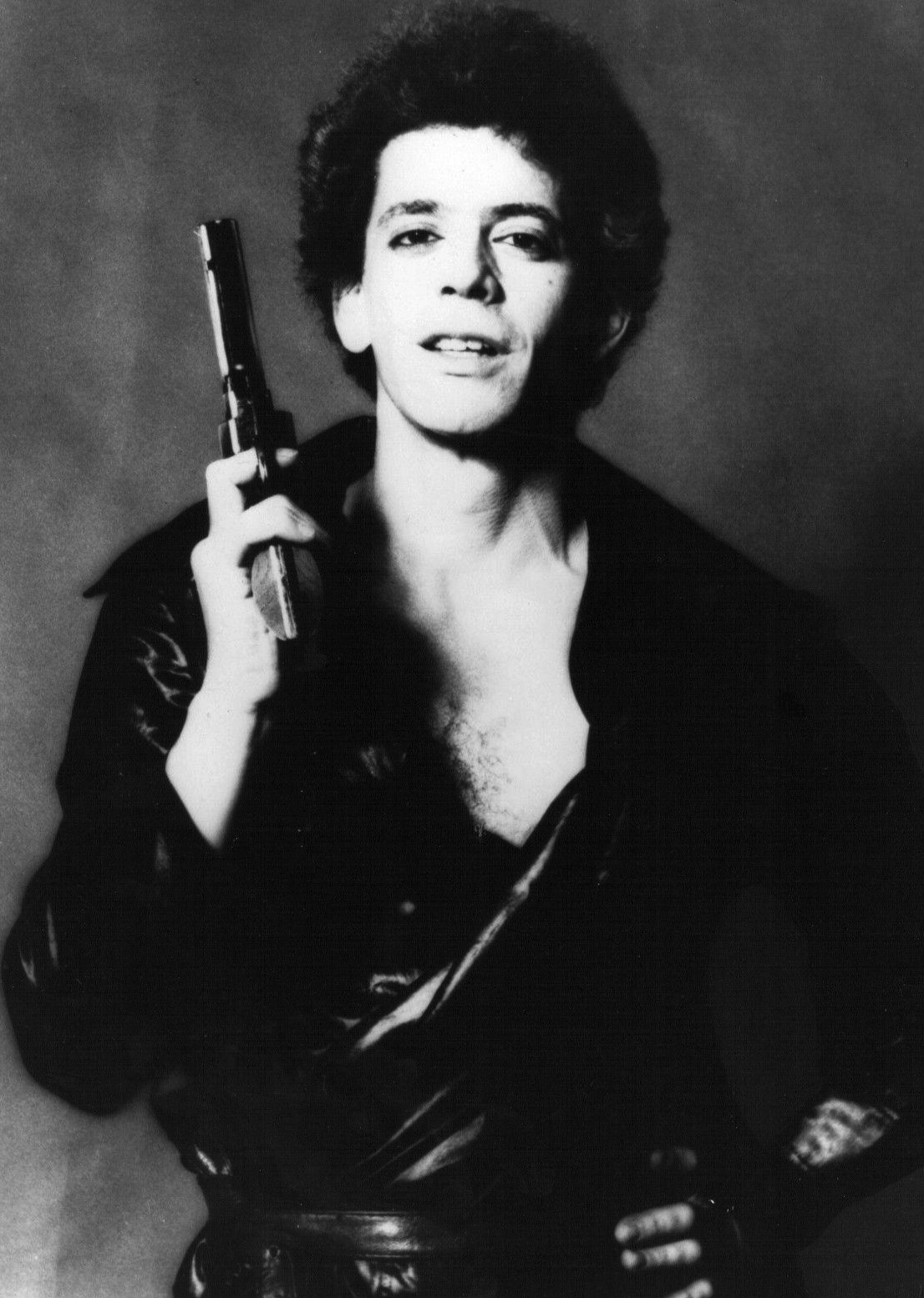
Singer-songwriter Lou Reed, pictured in 1977, intended for the song "Heroin" to give a somewhat analogous experience for the listener compared with an actual injecting user, leaving the listener ultimately unsatisfied.

Some tracks gain reputations about lyrical allusions and metaphors that are not intended by the creators. Seminal pop and rock group The Beatles faced commentary for decades about the track "Lucy in the Sky with Diamonds", a Lennon-McCartney composition with a title that in Acronym form spells LSD. Primary songwriter John Lennon was known for trying to record music that would paint the same kind of mental pictures as he witnessed during his drug experiments. Nonetheless, Lennon always insisted that the psychedelic rock song took inspiration from his then three-year-old son Julian Lennon's proud painting done in nursery school, an image about an actual girl named Lucy, and the title's resemblance to the illegal substance was a pure coincidence. Paul McCartney later conceded that the drug usage by the members of the band at the time had an "obvious" effect on their sound and pervaded that song in particular. Country and folk singer-songwriter John Denver faced a great amount of hassle for the perceived meanings in his song "Rocky Mountain High", even though the lyrics merely describe joys involving mountain climbing and appreciating nature. Denver described the matter when speaking to the Parents Music Resource Center group when he testified before the United States Senate in 1985 against music censorship.

Some songs that reference drug use are cited as causing emotionally strong feelings in the listener just by hearing them that seem deliberately reminiscent of the actual 'high' sensation, one example being alternative rock band Depeche Mode's 1987 single "Never Let Me Down Again". NME music journalist Jane Solanas has labeled the track a "masterpiece" that well conveys the feeling of "drug euphoria". The Velvet Underground's song "Heroin" deliberately shifts from a more laid-back sound to an aggressive, quicker pace as singer-songwriter Lou Reed's (personally an admitted user of illegal substances including heroin) vocals detail the physical injection and the related feelings immediately afterward. The track became immensely controversial due to its lack of a clear-cut condemnation of the substance, even though an anti-drug intent came out in how the band intentionally wanted the musical 'high' set up to leave the listener unsatisfied. Reed commented that the song provided "very close to the feeling you get from smack", stating: "You think you're enjoying it. But by the time it hits you, it's too late." Reed mimicked the action of injecting himself, even using his microphone cord to mime tying his arm, during some live song performances.

Examples of songs that refer to gaining 'highs' from things outside of drug use per se include British glam rock group Sweet's "Love Is Like Oxygen", a single that alludes to the (regulated, but in no way illegal) practice of enjoying intoxicating levels of oxygen. That song has similarities with an earlier track called "Grounds for Separation" by U.S. blue-eyed soul duo Hall & Oates, which has the lyrics: "Music, it's my life, and I've got it in me; but isn't it a bit like oxygen, 'cause too much will make you high (but not enough will make you die)".

== Differentiation between drugs ==
Heroin and cocaine usage have usually faced negative lyrical depictions, and addiction to those substances, particularly in terms of crack cocaine abuse, is often described in clearly antagonistic, unglamorous fashions. Tobacco, alcohol, and cannabis have faced widely varying depictions, in contrast, and recreational use of cannabis is far more likely to feature positively or at least neutrally in song lyrics.

Dating as far back as the 1930s, bluegrass artists and swing bands began to reference drugs in their music. These particular genres of early music consisted of questionable drug slurs that listeners were able to enjoy at any time. Artists of the bluegrass and swing genres directed their drug referencing towards cannabis, because of its popularity during that time period. Since then, referencing illicit substances in music has been a trend that seems to be unstoppable. Marijuana is the drug of choice when exploring what musicians prefer to incorporate in their music. Rock, hip hop, pop, electronic, and country music mention this particular drug a greater amount than any other substance. However, Jazz and Folk music tend to branch off of this popular trend and instead incorporate drugs like acid and cocaine into their lyrics.

In terms of a specific personal example, social activist and musician Linda McCartney is known for publicly remarked that she considered marijuana "pretty lightweight" while finding harder drugs to be "disgusting". She ended up being arrested in Barbados in 1984 for possession of marijuana, the same charge for which her husband had been arrested in Los Angeles nine years previous. Looking at musical genres and subgenres, multiple hard rock and heavy metal influenced groups have attracted the label of 'stoner rock' for frank references to 'bongs', 'pot', 'toking', 'weed', et cetera while avoiding mentioning other drugs in the same manner.

== Studies and research ==
Investigators at the Pacific Institute for Research and Evaluation, studied whether young people's substance use and aggressive behaviors was related to listening to music containing messages of substance use and violence. The data was collected by using self-administered questionnaires from a sample of community college students aged 15–25. Results showed that, "Listening to rap music [is] significantly and positively associated with alcohol use, problematic alcohol use, illicit drug use, and aggressive behaviors...". Additionally, "alcohol and illicit drug use were positively associated with listening to musical genres of techno and reggae".

The correlation between substance abuse and drugs is not only found in the United States, but across the world. Researchers across Europe collaborated and examined relationships between music preferences and substance use (tobacco, alcohol, cannabis) among 18,103 fifteen-year-olds from ten European countries. Results showed that, "...across Europe, preferences for mainstream Pop and High-brow (classical and jazz) were negatively associated with substance use, while preferences for Dance (house/trance and techno/hardhouse) were associated positively with substance use". This concludes that there is a direct relationship between choice of music and adolescent substance abuse in other regions of the world besides America.

Teenagers often fail to recognize that their music preferences may alter their values they hold on the acceptability of substance use. In addition, students who associated with the rave culture admit to struggling with psychedelic substance abuse such as LSD and psilocybin mushrooms. Researchers in the New York Department of Population Health examined rave attendees and relationships between recent use of various drugs in a representative sample of US high school seniors. Results showed that, "Rave attendees were more likely than non-attendees to report use of an illicit drug other than marijuana". Additionally, "...attendees were more likely to report more frequent use (≥6 times) of each drug".

There are many music types and locations that may have an immediate association with drugs. For example, " there was also a perceived association between EDM (electronic dance music) and drug culture,...". There are very heavy stigma and stereotypes surrounding music like this, mainly at the locations they are held, such as a club or concert venue. Most audience members go to a rave to listen to EDM music.

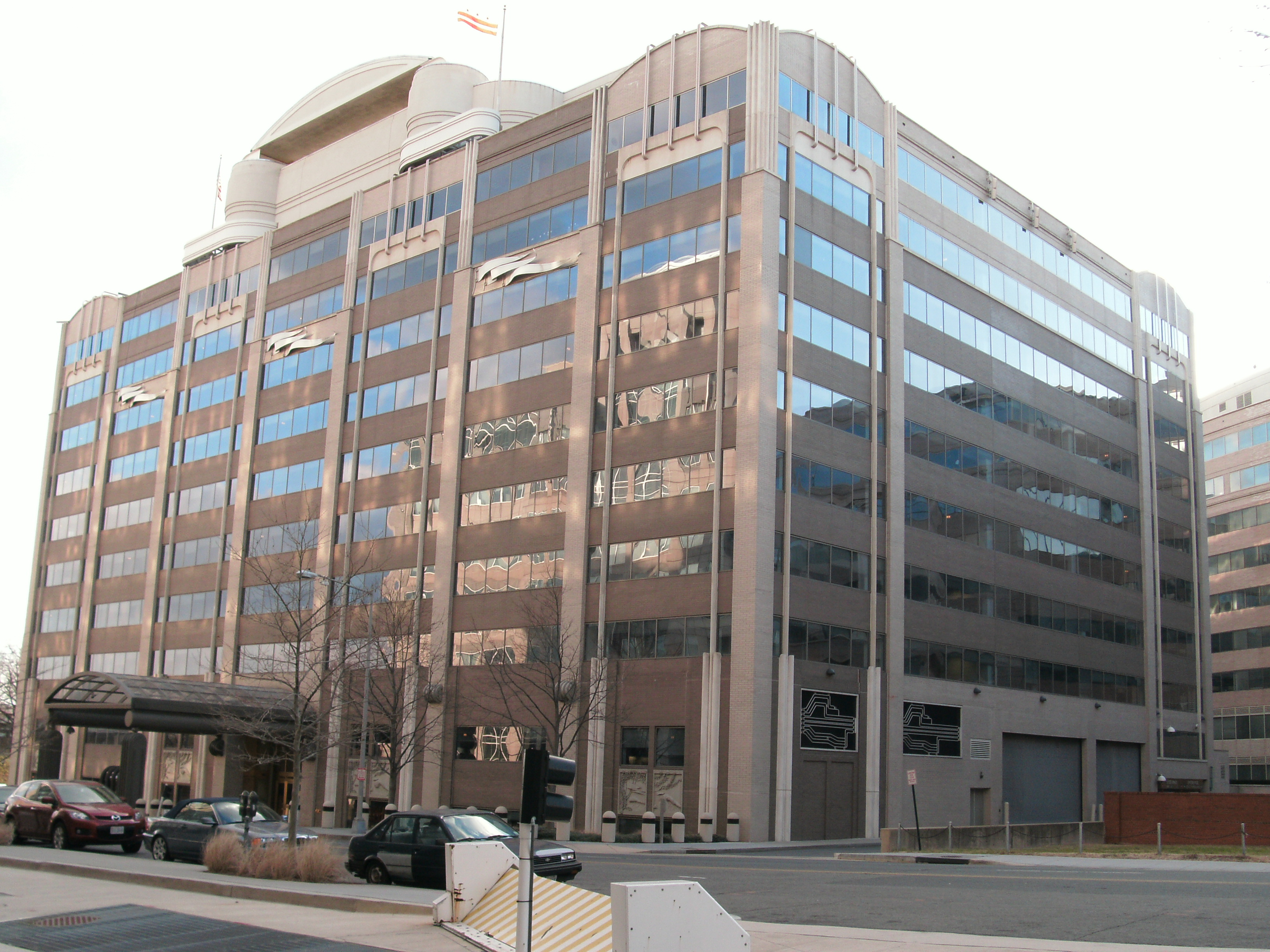
Headquartered in Washington, D.C., the Federal Communications Commission's (FCC) past efforts to push radio stations across the U.S. to avoid playing songs featuring drug references have faced a strong backlash.

The questions of truly how many popular songs out of the total number created refer in some way to substance use as well as to what degree music referencing drug use influences real-life behavior remain open and complex topics. A mere minute reference by itself may have no effect in a listener, and a specific lyrical condemnation may push the listener against a particular drug, trigger curiosity, or simply do nothing. The related issue of music censorship has been a matter debated for decades upon decades as well. In 1972, then Recording Industry Association of America (RIAA) president Stanley Gortikov garnered notice when he remarked, "Music reflects and mirrors a society more than it molds and directs that society." The year previous, the Federal Communications Commission (FCC) had issued an official statement cautioning radio stations to exercise "reasonable judgement" before playing records that might "promote or glorify" illegal drug use. Months of First Amendment based legal wrangling immediately followed, causing FCC backtracking. The inherent vagueness involved in trying to set up anti-drug standards, haggling about points in language, majorly complicate even non-governmental self-censorship.

A 1999 study sponsored by the U.S. government's Substance Abuse and Mental Health Services Administration (SAMHSA), a sub-group of the Department of Health and Human Services (DHS), looked at a sampling of a thousand popular songs from 1996 and 1997 based on commercial success. The study found that about three-fourths of the tracks lacked a direct reference to alcohol, tobacco, or illicit drugs. Of the 27% that did have such references, gigantic differences existed in terms of music genre; substance usage of some kind appeared in 75% of hip hop songs compared to 20% at maximum for every other type of song (such as within alternative rock and country singles). Finding the mentioning of illegal drug usage in 18% of the songs and of alcohol usage in 17% of them compared to only 3% referring to tobacco, the report also concluded that cannabis was by far the most common of the illicit drugs involved. That drug appeared in 63% of the tracks that referred to illegal substances. The study detected "few references that could be considered either explicitly pro-use or anti-use". Of the small minority of drug mentioning songs that went into the consequences of use and abuse, things were judged to be "slightly more negative than positive", with many of the songs evaluated citing mental consequences such as the "loss of ability to think clearly". Overall, the report's authors argued for "careful examination" of the matter, particularly given that even though the large majority of songs lack illegal drug references those that indeed have them mostly do not go into the consequences involved.

A later study sponsored by the Office of National Drug Control Policy also took a close look at how movies and songs affect teens. Looking at chart-topping songs of 2007, they found that one-third of these songs referenced either drugs or alcohol. The researchers found as well that 37% of all country songs sing about drugs or alcohol.

The authors of the aforementioned SAMSHA study expressed concern at findings such as the fact that only 19% of the songs selected that refer to illicit drugs mentioned any consequence, with many merely depicting intoxication and/or 'high' feelings only. They also noted how most teenagers cited "listening to music" as one of their favorite pastimes, even going as far as calling that "their most preferred non-school activity". However, the report did also include the caveat, "It is important to acknowledge that the mere existence of a certain type of media portrayal does not ensure that audiences will be influenced by it."

The extent to which whether or not usage of illegal substances as well as of legal drugs have substantially changed over the past several decades is unknown; many surveying difficulties exist. Findings mentioned in the publication SAMHSA News that came out in 2009 stated, "In 2008, an estimated 20.1 million Americans ages 12 or older were current illicit drug users." The clear majority of those were marijuana users, and the total percentage of illegal substance users out of their whole population sub-group constituted 8.0% in both 2007 and 2008. The report also found, "Among 12- to 17-year-olds, there was a significant decline in overall past-month illicit drug use, from 11.6 percent in 2002 to 9.3 percent in 2008." The complex findings also had some mixed results in specific areas, however, such as how notable "increases in the current use of pain relievers" occurred among young Americans.

Looking at the picture more recently, researchers at the University of Michigan long-running 'Monitoring the Future' project stated in 2014 that teenage use "of both alcohol and cigarettes dropped ... to their lowest points since the study began in 1975". Abuse of prescription drugs, particularly narcotic substances, remained essentially steady or otherwise declined in the 2013 to 2014 period. About a quarter of teens admitted to using marijuana within the past year before being surveyed; only along the lines of one in seven or less appeared involved in things such as sedative usage and tobacco smoking. Nonetheless, the researchers cautioned against feelings of complacency.

Researchers at Newcastle University in the United Kingdom have also explored drug use in music, proposing that 'drug use' includes both illicit substances as well as conventional over the counter or prescription medications. This work proposes a continuum of drug use in music, that includes all pharmacologically active substances and highlights their use in the creative arts.

== Influence within specific genres ==
=== Hip-hop ===
A-Trak, a Canadian DJ who has worked with hip-hop producers such as Kanye West and John Legend, argues that hip-hop has popularized the use and consumption of drugs while glossing over their negative side effects. He remarked that rap "went from glorifying selling hard drugs to glamorizing their effects''. In contrast, preliminary research has identified hip-hop music as a potential substance use intervention.

Some artists claim that the consumption of drugs has helped them with the creative process. In the documentary The Carter (2009), rapper Lil Wayne admitted to being addicted to lean, a mixture of codeine-promethazine cough syrup and soda. This drug has been closely tied to his creative output and in ways came to define his public image and sound during that period. While critics like A-Trak argue that modern rap glamorizes substance effects, sociological research highlights the genre’s nuanced role in both shaping perceptions of Black communities and acting as a tool for sociopolitical expression.

== Partial list of songs referencing drug use ==
- "The A Team" by Ed Sheeran
- "The Acid Queen" by The Who (covered by artists such as Tina Turner)
- "Adios" by Rammstein
- "All Gold Everything" by Trinidad James
- "All Summer Long" by Kid Rock
- "Amphetamine Annie", Canned Heat, (1968)
- "Amphetamine Logic by The Sisters of Mercy
- "And She Was" by Talking Heads
- "Angel Dust" by Gil Scott Heron
- "Because I Got High" by Afroman
- "Beetlebum" by Blur
- "Blood on the Leaves" by Kanye West
- "Blunt Blowin" by Lil Wayne
- "Cabbies on Crack" by the Ramones
- "Can't Feel My Face" by The Weeknd
- "Captain Jack" by Billy Joel
- "Carbona Not Glue" by the Ramones
- "Casey Jones" by the Grateful Dead
- "Chinese Rocks" by Dee Dee Ramone, performed by The Heartbreakers and The Ramones
- "Cocaine" by J.J. Cale (covered most notably by Eric Clapton)
- "Cocaine Blues" composed by T. J. "Red" Arnall (performed by artists such as Woody Guthrie and Bob Dylan)
- "Cokane in My Brain" by Dillinger
- "Cocaine (Killed My Community)" by Alabama 3
- "Cod'ine" by Buffy Sainte-Marie, later covered by Donovan, Janis Joplin, the Charlatans, Quicksilver Messenger Service, Man, the Litter, the Leaves, Jimmy Gilmer, Gram Parsons
- "Coming into Los Angeles" by Arlo Guthrie from his album Running Down the Road (1969)
- "Crack Music" by Kanye West
- "Crazy Rap" by Afroman
- "Day Tripper" by The Beatles
- "Dead Flowers" by The Rolling Stones
- "Devil Pray" by Madonna
- "Diamonds" by Rihanna
- "(Don't Bring) Harry" by The Stranglers
- "Dope" by Lady Gaga
- "Drug Ballad" by Eminem
- "Drugs" by Talking Heads
- "Explode" by Nelly Furtado
- "Florida Kilos" by Lana Del Rey
- "Flying High" by Country Joe and the Fish
- "Flying High Again" by Ozzy Osbourne
- "The Free Mexican Airforce" by Peter Rowan
- "The Future" by Prince
- "Girl With No Eyes", It's A Beautiful Day, (1969)
- "Gold Dust Woman" by Fleetwood Mac
- "Habits (Stay High)" by Tove Lo
- "Hand of Doom" by Black Sabbath
- "Hash Pipe" by Weezer
- "Here Come the Nice" by The Small Faces
- "Heroin" by The Velvet Underground
- "High by the Beach" by Lana Del Rey
- "High Cost of Living" by Jamey Johnson
- "High for This" by the Weeknd
- "Hong Kong Blues" by Hoagy Carmichael (1939); covered by many others
- "I Need Drugs" by Necro
- "I Wanna Be Sedated" by the Ramones
- "I'm Waiting for the Man" by the Velvet Underground
- "If You're a Viper" by Stuff Smith (covered by artists such as Fats Waller and others)
- "Itchycoo Park" by the Small Faces
- "Junco Partner" by James Wayne (covered by artists such as Dr. John and others)
- Sludge Factory by Alice in Chains
- "Junkhead" by Alice in Chains
- "Kaya" by Bob Marley and the Wailers
- "Kickstart My Heart" by Mötley Crüe
- "Kid Charlemagne" by Steely Dan
- "Kiss Land" by the Weeknd
- "Legend of a Mind" by The Moody Blues
- "Lost" by Frank Ocean
- "Lucy in the Sky with Diamonds" by The Beatles
- "Marahuana" by Gertrude Michael (covered by artists such as Bette Midler)
- "Marijuana" by Kid Cudi
- "Mary Jane" by Tori Amos
- "Mary Jane Holland" by Lady Gaga
- ”Mask Off” by Future
- "Master of Puppets (song)" by Metallica
- "The Message" by Grandmaster Flash and the Furious Five
- "Minnie the Moocher", Cab Calloway and many others
- "Molly" by Tyga
- "Morning Glory" by Oasis
- "Mother's Little Helper", The Rolling Stones
- "Mr. Brownstone" by Guns N' Roses
- "My Mother Smokes Crack Rocks" by Wesley Willis
- "Pill Popper" by Jeremie
- "The Needle and the Damage Done" by Neil Young
- "The Needle and the Spoon" by Lynyrd Skynyrd
- "Needle in the Hay" by Elliott Smith
- "Needles" by System of a Down
- "Never Let Me Down Again" by Depeche Mode
- "New Americana" by Halsey
- "Now I Wanna Sniff Some Glue" by The Ramones, (1976)
- "Panama Red" by Peter Rowan
- "The Pusher" written by Hoyt Axton, made popular by Steppenwolf
- "Pusher Love Girl" by Justin Timberlake
- "Roc Boys (And the Winner Is)..." by Jay-Z
- "Running to Stand Still" by U2
- "Sailin' Shoes" by Little Feat
- "Sam Stone" by John Prine
- "Seeds and Stems (Again)" by Commander Cody and His Lost Planet Airmen
- "Semi-Charmed Life" by Third Eye Blind
- "She Said She Said" by The Beatles (1966)
- "Sister Morphine" by The Rolling Stones
- "Smoke a Little Smoke" by Eric Church
- "Smokin' in the Boys Room" by Brownsville Station (covered by artists such as Mötley Crüe)
- "Snowblind" by Black Sabbath
- "So Young" by Suede
- "Somebody Put Something in My Drink" by The Ramones (1986)
- "Sorted For E's & Wizz" by Pulp
- "Sweet Leaf" by Black Sabbath
- "That Cat is High" by The Ink Spots (covered by artists such as The Manhattan Transfer)
- "Time to Pretend" by MGMT
- "Too Much Junkie Business" by The Heartbreakers
- "Trap Queen" by Fetty Wap
- "Truckin'" by the Grateful Dead
- "U.O.E.N.O." by Rocko
- "Wasted Union Blues" by It's A Beautiful Day (1969)
- "We Can't Stop" by Miley Cyrus
- "What a Waster" by The Libertines
- "White Lady White Powder" by Elton John
- "White Lines (Don't Don't Do It)" by Grandmaster Melle Mel
- "Willin" by Little Feat, covered by Linda Ronstadt
- "White Rabbit" by Jefferson Airplane (1967)
- "Lean wit Me" by Juice Wrld
- "With a Little Help from My Friends" by the Beatles (covered by artists such as Joe Cocker and Wet Wet Wet)
- ”Nosetalgia” by Pusha T
- ”Diet Coke” by Pusha T

== See also ==
- Drug education
- Recreational drug use
- Substance dependence
- The Filthy Fifteen list
- "Wine, women and song"
