= Corrine, Corrina =

12-bar country blues song by Bo Carter

Single by Charlie McCoy and Bo Chatman
- B-side: "In the Gutter" (John Oscar)
- Released: August 1929
- Recorded: November 1928
- Genre: Country blues
- Length: 3:20
- Label: Brunswick (no. 7080)

"Corrine, Corrina" (Roud 10030; sometimes spelled "Corrina, Corrina") is a 12-bar country blues song in the AAB form. "Corrine, Corrina" was first recorded by Bo Carter (Brunswick 7080, December 1928). However, it was not copyrighted until 1932 by Bo Carter (under his real name, Armenter Chatmon), along with his publishers Mitchell Parish and J. Mayo Williams.

The song is familiar for its opening verse:

Corrine, Corrina, where you been so long?
Corrine, Corrina, where you been so long?
I ain't had no lovin', since you've been gone

The Mississippi Sheiks, as the Jackson Blue Boys with Papa Charlie McCoy on vocals, recorded the song in 1930 under the title "Sweet Alberta" (Columbia 14397-D), substituting the words 'Sweet Alberta' for 'Corrine, Corrina'. "Corrine, Corrina" has been recorded in a number of musical styles, including blues, jazz, rock and roll, Cajun, and Western swing. The title varies from recording to recording, but is most often spelled "Corrina, Corrina".

== History ==
"Corrine, Corrina" may have traditional roots, however, earlier songs are different musically and lyrically. One of the earliest is the commercial sheet music song "Has Anybody Seen My Corrine?" published by Roger Graham in 1918. Vernon Dalhart (Edison 6166) recorded a vocal version in 1918, and Wilbur Sweatman's Original Jazz Band (Columbia A-2663), an instrumental version the same year. Graham's song contains sentiments similar to "Corrine, Corrina":

Has anybody seen my Corrine?
No matter where Corrina may be
Tell my Corrina to come right back to me
I want some lovin' sweetie dear

Blind Lemon Jefferson recorded a version of "C.C. Rider" in April 1926 entitled "Corrina Blues" which contains a verse in a similar vein:

If you see Corrina, tell her to hurry home
I ain't had no true love since Corrina been gone (3×)

The Mississippi Sheiks also recorded "Sweet Maggie" in the 1930s:

Sweet Maggie sweet Maggie where you bin so long
Tell me sweet Maggie where you bin so long
There hasn't bin no lovin since you bin gone

== Recordings ==
=== Blues records ===
Notable early singers to record versions of the song included Blind Lemon Jefferson (1926, as "Corrina Blues"), Bo Carter (1928), Charlie McCoy (1928), Tampa Red (1929, 1930), James "Boodle It" Wiggins (1929), Frankie "Half Pint" Jaxon (1929), Walter Davis (1939), Johnny Temple (1940), and Big Joe Turner (1941). Veteran blues artists recorded for the revival market include Mississippi John Hurt (1966) and Mance Lipscomb (1968). Postwar-blues artists recording the song included Taj Mahal and Snooky Pryor.

Marianne Faithfull recorded the blues version on her album Rich Kid Blues (recorded 1971 / released 1985).

=== Jazz recordings ===
Among the musicians to record the song were Wilbur Sweatman, Red Nichols (1930). Cab Calloway (1931), Art Tatum (1941), the Black Sorrows (1985), and Natalie Cole.

=== Early country recordings ===
Several recordings were made for the country market by artists including Clayton McMichen (1929) and the Cajun musician Leo Soileau (1935).

"Corrine Corrina"

Single by Bob Wills and His Texas Playboys
- B-side: "Goodnight Little Sweetheart"
- Released: December 1941
- Recorded: April 15, 1940
- Studio: Burrus Sawmill Studio, Saginaw, Texas
- Genre: Western swing, country blues
- Label: Okeh 06530
- Songwriters: Bo Carter, Mitchell Parish, J. Mayo Williams

Bob Wills and His Texas Playboys singles chronology
"Lil Liza Jane" (1941)	"Corrine Corrina" (1941)	"Cherokee Maiden" (1942)

=== Western swing recordings ===
In 1934, Milton Brown and his Musical Brownies recorded the song under the title "Where Have You Been So Long, Corrinne," as a Western swing dance song. Shortly thereafter, Bob Wills adapted it again as "Corrine, Corrina," also in the Western swing style. Following his recording with the Texas Playboys (OKeh 06530) on April 15, 1940, the song entered the standard repertoire of all Western swing bands, influencing the adoption of "Corrine, Corrina" by Cajun bands and later by individual country artists.

"Corrine, Corrina" is also an important song related to Western swing's pioneering use of electrically amplified stringed instruments. It was one of the songs recorded during a session in Dallas on September 28, 1935, by Roy Newman and His Boys (OKeh 03117). Their guitarist, Jim Boyd, played what is the first use of an electrically amplified guitar found on a recording.

Cliff Bruner's Texas Wanderers also recorded an early version of Chatmon's song on February 5, 1937 (Decca 5350).

=== Folk music revival recordings ===
"Corrina, Corrina" entered the folk-like acoustical tradition during the American folk music revival of the 1960s when Bob Dylan began playing a version he titled "Corrina, Corrina". Although his blues-based version contains lyrics and song structure from "Corrine Corrina", his melody is lifted from "Stones in My Passway" (Vocalion 3723) recorded by Robert Johnson in 1937. Dylan's version, found on his second album, The Freewheelin' Bob Dylan, also borrows lyrics taken from Johnson's song:

I got a bird that whistles, I got a bird that sings (2×)

The Rising Sons, featuring Taj Mahal and Ry Cooder, recorded the song as "Corinna, Corinna" before breaking up in 1966. Taj Mahal then recorded another version in 1968 titled "Corinna". Michael Cooney included it under the title "Weeping Willow (Corrina)" on his 1976 album on Front Hall Records, Singer of Old Songs. Joni Mitchell covered the song in 1988 on her album Chalk Mark in a Rain Storm, with the title "A Bird That Whistles (Corrina Corrina)", and adding a flight-evoking Wayne Shorter soprano sax solo. Other artists who have recorded the song include Eric Clapton, who sings it as "Alberta, Alberta", Willie Nelson, Steve Gillette, Leo Kottke, and Conor Oberst. The English roots band Show of Hands also performed the song on their live album As You Were, released in 2005 under the duo's own label Hands on Music. The Band (featuring Miranda Sykes as a special guest for this part of the album) used the Dylan/Johnson version of the song. Dylan's recording was covered by Pete Townshend on the Dylan tribute album Chimes of Freedom: The Songs of Bob Dylan Honoring 50 Years of Amnesty International.

=== Rock recordings ===
"Corrine, Corrina"

Single by Ray Peterson

from the album The Very Best of Ray Peterson
- B-side: "Be My Girl"
- Released: November 1960
- Recorded: 1960
- Genre: Country blues
- Length: 2:38
- Label: Dunes
- Songwriters: Bo Carter, Mitchell Parish, J. Mayo Williams
- Producer: Phil Spector

Ray Peterson singles chronology
"Answer Me" (1960)	"Corrine, Corrina" (1960)	"Sweet Little Kathy" (1961)

Big Joe Turner recorded a rendition of the song for Atlantic Records in 1956. Ray Peterson's 1960 version, produced by Phil Spector, reached number nine on the Billboard chart and number three in Canada. Jerry Lee Lewis included a version on his 1965 album, The Return of Rock. Bill Haley & His Comets released a rock n' roll version on Decca Records on their album Bill Haley's Chicks in 1959. Taj Mahal and Jesse Ed Davis performed a live version on The Rolling Stones Rock and Roll Circus which became available upon release in 1996. Steppenwolf recorded it as "Corina, Corina" for Steppenwolf Live, released in April 1970. A version by King Biscuit Boy with Crowbar was number 29 on the Canadian charts in October 1970. Rod Stewart recorded a rendition between 2011 and 2013, and it is featured as a bonus track on his Time album. Boz Scaggs included it on his 2013 album Memphis. The rock band Phish has covered a version of the song in live concerts throughout their career (played first in February 1987).

The Swedish group Sven-Ingvars recorded the song twice - first in 1961 on their second EP Pony Time and 1964 on their second LP Sven-Ingvars

The song is played in the Swedish movie Black Jack from 1990 directed by Colin Nutley.

=== Country recordings ===
Dean Martin, better known as a crooner, included the song on his second country music album, Dean "Tex" Martin Rides Again (1963). Country and blues singer/pianist Moon Mullican did a version on his second last album in 1966. Asleep at the Wheel recorded the song for their 1993 album A Tribute to the Music of Bob Wills & the Texas Playboys with Brooks & Dunn. Their version peaked at number 73 on the Billboard Hot Country Singles & Tracks chart in 1994. Country rock singer Gib Guilbeau recorded a reworked version of the song entitled "Alberta Alberta" on his self titled 1973 album. Bill Monroe did a bluegrass version in 1977.

== Legacy ==
The song was reportedly a favourite of Michael 'Tarzan' Fomenko (c.1930–2018), who sang the song around the piano in the 1950s with his family in suburban Sydney, Australia.

== Bibliography ==
- Cheseborough, Steve. "Carter, Bo". Encyclopedia of the Blues pp. 185–186, edited by Edward M. Komara. Routledge, 2005. ISBN 0-415-92700-5
- Clayton, Lawrence. The Roots of Texas Music. Texas A&M University Press, 2005. ISBN 1-58544-492-8
- Dempsey, John Mark. The Light Crust Doughboys Are on the Air: Celebrating Seventy Years of Texas Music. University of North Texas Press, 2002. ISBN 1-57441-151-9
- Dixon, Robert M.W. Blues & Gospel Records, 1902–1943. Storyville Publications, 1982. ISBN 0-902391-03-8
- Ginell, Cary. Milton Brown and the Founding of Western Swing. Urbana, IL: University of Illinois Press, 1994. ISBN 0-252-02041-3
- Govenar, Alan B.; Jay F. Brakefield. Deep Ellum and Central Track: Where the Black and White Worlds of Dallas Converged. University of North Texas Press, 1998. ISBN 1-57441-051-2
- Seubert, David. "Has Anybody Seen My Corrine. Donald C. Davidson Library, University of California, Santa Barbara, Cylinder Preservation and Digitization Project.
- Waltz, Robert B; David G. Engle. "Corrina, Corrina ". The Traditional Ballad Index: An Annotated Bibliography of the Folk Songs of the English-Speaking World. Hosted by California State University, Fresno, Folklore, 2007.
