= Reefer Songs =

Compilation album by Various artists
- Released: 1989
- Recorded: June 17, 1932 – November 2, 1945
- Genre: Jazz, blues
- Length: 1:09:08
- Label: Stash, Mojo Records cat# MOJO 302

Reefer Songs is a 1989 compilation album of jazz songs about drugs from the 1920s, 1930s, and 1940s. It features notable artists and musicians of the period, including Ella Fitzgerald, Chick Webb, Cab Calloway, Sidney Bechet and Benny Goodman. Although cannabis is the main drug cited here, cocaine, benzedrine (amphetamine) and heroin are also mentioned.

== Track listing ==
1. "Reefer Man"
2. "Man from Harlem"
3. "Here Comes the Man with the Jive"
4. "If You're a Viper"
5. "Texas Tea Party"
6. "Light Up"
7. "Jack, I'm Mellow"
8. "Sweet Marijuana Brown"
9. "Viper Mad"
10. "The Weed Smoker's Dream (Why Don't You Do Right)"
11. "The 'G' Man Got the 'T' Man"
12. "All the Jive Is Gone"
13. "The Stuff Is Here"
14. "Wacky Dust"
15. "Who Put the Benzedrine in Mrs. Murphy's Ovaltine?"
16. "Jerry the Junker"
17. "Reefer Song"
18. "Lotus Blossom"
19. "Willie the Chimney Sweeper"
20. "Weed"
21. "Save the Roach for Me"
22. "Knockin' Myself Out"
23. "Minnie the Moocher"
