= Why Don't You Do Right? =

Blues song popularized by Peggy Lee

"Weed Smoker's Dream"

Single by Harlem Hamfats
- B-side: "Little Girl"
- Released: 1936
- Recorded: Chicago, October 2, 1936
- Genre: Blues, jazz
- Length: 3:19
- Label: Decca
- Songwriters: Kansas Joe McCoy, Herb Morand

"Why Don't You Do Right?" (originally recorded as "Weed Smoker's Dream" in 1936) is an American blues and jazz-influenced pop song usually credited to Kansas Joe McCoy. A minor key twelve-bar blues with a few chord substitutions, it is considered a classic "woman's blues" song and has become a standard. Singer Lil Green recorded a popular rendition in 1941, which Peggy Lee recorded the next year – accompanied by Benny Goodman – and made one of her signature songs.

The song appeared in the 1988 film Who Framed Roger Rabbit, performed by actress Amy Irving as the singing voice of Jessica Rabbit.

== Composition and lyrics ==
In 1936, the Harlem Hamfats jazz band recorded "The Weed Smoker's Dream". The original Decca Records release listed the songwriters as "McCoy-Moran" (Kansas Joe McCoy and Herb Morand were members of the band). McCoy later rewrote the song, refining the composition and lyrics. The new tune, titled "Why Don't You Do Right?", was recorded by Lil Green in 1941, with guitar by William "Big Bill" Broonzy. The recording was an early jazz and blues hit.

The song has its roots in blues music and originally dealt with a marijuana smoker reminiscing about lost financial opportunities. As it was rewritten, it takes on the perspective of the female partner, who chastises her man for his irresponsible ways, complaining that her other lovers provide her with more money: "Why don't you do right, like some other men do? Get out of here and get me some money too."

== Peggy Lee recording ==
"Why Don't You Do Right"
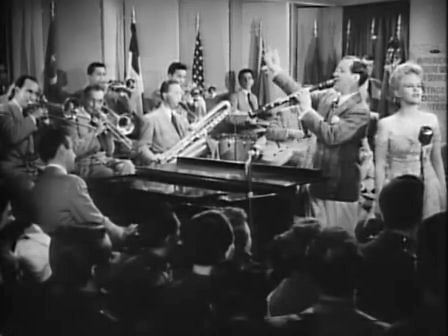
- Benny Goodman and His Orchestra with Peggy Lee, performing "Why Don't You Do Right" in Stage Door Canteen (1943)

Single by Benny Goodman with Peggy Lee
- B-side: "Six Flats Unfurnished"
- Released: 1942
- Recorded: New York, July 27, 1942
- Genre: Jazz
- Length: 3:12
- Label: Columbia
- Songwriter: Kansas Joe McCoy

Audio
- "Why Don't You Do Right" on YouTube

One of the best-known versions of the song was recorded by Peggy Lee and Benny Goodman on July 27, 1942, in New York. Featured in the 1943 film, Stage Door Canteen, it sold over one million copies, and brought her to nationwide attention.

Lee often stated that Green's recording was influential to her music. In a 1971 interview she said, "I had the record, and I used to play it over and over in my dressing room, which was next to Benny Goodman ... Finally ... he said, 'I think you really like that song.' I said, 'Oh, I love it.' He said, 'Would you like to sing it?'" Lee said yes, so Goodman had an arrangement made of it for Lee to sing.

"Why Don't You Do Right" reached number four on both the Billboard chart and the Harlem Hit Parade chart.

Lee also recorded a soundie version of the song which appeared in the 2010 video game Fallout: New Vegas on the in-game radio station of Radio New Vegas.

== See also ==
- List of 1930s jazz standards
- Who Framed Roger Rabbit (soundtrack)
- "Why Don't You"
