= Rosetta Howard =

American singer

Rosetta Howard (August 30, 1913 – October 8, 1974) was an American blues singer who recorded in the 1930s and 1940s.

Little is known of her life. She was born in Woodruff County, Arkansas, and later moved to Chicago, Illinois, where she began her career by joining in with jukebox selections at the club where she worked. Around 1932, she began singing professionally with Jimmie Noone and other bandleaders including Sonny Thompson. Beginning in 1937 she made a number of recordings with the Harlem Hamfats, including her paean to marijuana, "If You're a Viper", and the ribald "Let Your Linen Hang Low". The latter was noted by one music journalist as "Howard engaging Kansas Joe McCoy in sexy banter". She also recorded with Herb Morand and Odell Rand, who were members of the group. In 1939 she recorded with the Harlem Blues Serenaders, who included Charlie Shavers, Buster Bailey, Lil Armstrong, Henry "Red" Allen and Barney Bigard.

She continued to perform in Chicago in the 1940s, and in 1947 featured on recordings with the Big Three, including Willie Dixon and Big Bill Broonzy. The records were unsuccessful, and she did not record again. In the 1950s she sang with Thomas A. Dorsey at the Pilgrim Baptist Church in Chicago.

Howard died in Chicago in 1974.
