= Harlem Hamfats =

Chicago jazz band

- Origin: Chicago, Illinois, United States
- Genres: Swing jazz, Dixieland
- Years active: 1936–1938
- Label: Decca
- Past members: Kansas Joe McCoy; Papa Charlie McCoy; Herb Morand; John Lindsay; Odell Rand; Horace Malcolm; Freddie Flynn; Pearlis Williams

The Harlem Hamfats was a Chicago jazz band formed in 1936. Initially, they mainly provided backup music for jazz and blues singers, such as Johnny Temple, Rosetta Howard, and Frankie Jaxon, for Decca Records. Their first record, "Oh! Red", became a hit, securing them a Decca contract for fifty titles, and they launched a successful recording career performing danceable music.

The group's inclusion in the dirty blues genre is due to such songs as "Gimme Some of That Yum Yum" and "Let's Get Drunk and Truck".

== Biography ==
Despite their name, the Hamfats were based in Chicago. They were assembled by record producer and entrepreneur J. Mayo Williams for the purpose of making records — perhaps the first group to be so created. None of the members of the band were actually from New York. Kansas Joe McCoy (guitar, vocals) and his brother Papa Charlie McCoy (guitar, mandolin) were from Mississippi; Herb Morand (trumpet, vocals), John Lindsay (bass), and Odell Rand (clarinet; 1905 – 22 June 1960) were from New Orleans; Horace Malcolm (piano), Freddie Flynn (drums) and Pearlis Williams (drums) were from Chicago.

The diverse geographical backgrounds of the musicians played a role in the band's sound, which blended blues, dixieland and swing jazz. Led by Morand and Joe McCoy, the main songwriters, the group initially provided instrumental backing to Williams's stable of artists, including Frankie Jaxon, Rosetta Howard, and Johnny Temple. They were perhaps the first studio recording band to become a performing act in their own right, and they recorded extensively.

Their first hits were "Oh! Red", recorded in April 1936, and "Let's Get Drunk and Truck" (originally recorded by Tampa Red), recorded in August of the same year. "Oh! Red" was popular enough to be covered by Count Basie, the Ink Spots, Blind Willie McTell, Blind Boy Fuller and Bull City Red, various Western swing bands, and Howlin' Wolf. Some of their other recordings, such as "We Gonna Pitch a Boogie Woogie", more clearly presage the rhythms of rock and roll. Their most recognizable work may be the modern jazz tune "Why Don't You Do Right?", written by Joe McCoy and included on their 1936 record under the title "The Weed Smoker's Dream". The song contains numerous references to drugs. The lyrics were later changed and the tune refined. Lil Green recorded it as "Why Don't You Do Right", a song about a conniving mistress and her broke lover, in 1941, and it was later recorded by Peggy Lee with the Benny Goodman Orchestra.

By 1939, singer Morand had returned to New Orleans, and changing fashions had made the sound of the Harlem Hamfats less commercially attractive. The band was not considered the most innovative group of the time, and many of their original works dealt with sex, drugs and alcohol, which may have prevented its music from being more widely available. However, as a small group playing entertaining music primarily for dancing, they are considered an important contributor to 1930s jazz, and their early riff-based style would help pave the way for Louis Jordan's small-group sound a few years later, rhythm and blues, and later rock and roll.

== Selected discography ==
Year	Title	Genre	Label
2004	Let's Get Drunk and Truck	Swing jazz	Fabulous
1997	Hamfats Swing 1936–1938	Swing jazz	EPM Musique
1994	Harlem Hamfats, Vol. 4	Swing jazz	Document Records
1994	Harlem Hamfats, Vol. 3	Swing jazz	Document Records
1994	Harlem Hamfats, Vol. 2	Swing jazz	Document Records
1994	Harlem Hamfats, Vol. 1	Swing jazz	Document Records
