= Who Framed Roger Rabbit (disambiguation) =

Who Framed Roger Rabbit is a 1988 American comedy film directed by Robert Zemeckis.

Who Framed Roger Rabbit may also refer to:

- Who Framed Roger Rabbit (1988 video game), a video game for the DOS, Amiga, Atari ST, Apple II and Commodore 64 computers released by Buena Vista Software
- Who Framed Roger Rabbit (1989 video game), a video game for the Nintendo Entertainment System by Rare and published by LJN Toys
- Who Framed Roger Rabbit (1991 video game), a video game for the Game Boy released by Capcom
- Who Framed Roger Rabbit (soundtrack), same name of the 1988 film

== See also ==
- List of Who Framed Roger Rabbit media
- Who Censored Roger Rabbit?, novel and basis for the film
- Roger Rabbit (disambiguation)
