= Here Comes the Man with the Jive =

Here Comes the Man with the Jive is a drug-themed jazz song. It was and composed by Leroy "Stuff" Smith and Jack Palmer.

== Recordings ==
Smith recorded the song with his orchestra, Stuff Smith and his Onyx Club Boys, for Vocalion on August 21, 1936.

== Theme ==
Although the title of the song refers to a type of African-American slang (Jive, slang for marijuana) the lyrics explicitly talk about "vipers" (Marijuana users) and encourages the listener to "light up" and "get real high".

== See also ==
- Reefer Songs
