= Have You Ever Met That Funny Reefer Man =

1932 jazz song performed by Cab Calloway

Single by Cab Calloway
- Released: 1932
- Genre: Jazz
- Label: Columbia Records
- Songwriter(s): Andy Razaf
- Composer(s): J. Russel Robinson

"Have You Ever Met That Funny Reefer Man", often known simply as "The Reefer Man", is a 1932 American jazz song composed by J. Russel Robinson, with lyrics by Andy Razaf. It was first recorded by Cab Calloway and his orchestra, with versions by others over the years, including by Harlan Lattimore, Murphy's Law and Big Bad Voodoo Daddy.

The song as performed by Calloway appears in the 1933 film International House.

== See also ==
- Reefer Songs
