= Wacky Dust =

Single by Ella Fitzgerald
- Released: 1938
- Genre: Jazz
- Songwriter(s): Oscar Levant, Stanley Adams

Ella Fitzgerald singles chronology
| "I Found My Yellow Basket" (1938) | "Wacky Dust" (1938) | "MacPherson Is Rehearsin' To Swing" (1938) |

"Wacky Dust" is a 1938 song by Ella Fitzgerald with the Chick Webb orchestra written by Oscar Levant and Stanley Adams. It is an uptempo song about the joys (and dangers) of taking cocaine. It is also included on the Swingsation album of Ella Fitzgerald songs released on 16 June 1998 which were all recorded in New York City between September 1934 and February 1939. The song features on the compilation CD Reefer Songs.

The song was covered by The Manhattan Transfer on their 1979 album Extensions.
