= Johnny Temple (blues musician) =

American blues guitarist and singer

- Born: October 18, 1906; Canton, Mississippi, United States
- Died: November 22, 1968 (aged 62) Jackson, Mississippi, United States
- Genres: Delta blues, folk blues
- Occupations: Musician, songwriter
- Instruments: Guitar, vocals, piano, washboard

Johnny Temple (October 18, 1906 – November 22, 1968) was an American Chicago blues guitarist and singer, who was active in the 1930s and 1940s. He was variously billed as Johnny Temple, Johnnie Temple and Johnnie "Geechie" Temple.

== Life and career ==
Temple was born in Canton, Mississippi, and grew up around Jackson. He learned to play guitar and mandolin as a child and began playing house parties as a teenager. While in Jackson he befriended Skip James. He moved to Chicago in the early 1930s and started playing with Joe McCoy in clubs. Temple began recording songs such as "The Evil Devil Blues" and "Lead Pencil Blues" in 1935. His most popular record, "Louise Louise Blues," released by Decca Records, was a hit in 1936. The Harlem Hamfats, a Chicago jazz band formed in 1936, provided backup music for Temple and other singers. By 1940, Decca had released two dozen of his records.

Temple continued recording with various labels through most of the 1940s. His connection with the record producer Mayo Williams provided him with recording opportunities until 1949. After World War II, Temple played an important role in welcoming blues musicians who arrived from the South. Though his recording career ended, he continued to perform gigs, often alongside Big Walter Horton and Billy Boy Arnold. He returned to Mississippi in the mid-1950s, where he continued to perform in clubs and juke joints in and around Jackson.

Temple eventually gave up the blues to become a minister. He died of cancer on November 22, 1968, aged 62, in Jackson.

== Discography ==
| Artist | Recording date | Matrix | Song | Catalog | Release date |
|---|---|---|---|---|---|
| Johnnie Temple | 14 May 1935 | C-987-A | "The Evil Devil Blues" | Vocalion 02987 | 1935 |
| Johnnie Temple | 14 May 1935 | C-987-B | "Jacksonville Blues" | Vocalion 02987 | 1935 |
| Johnnie Temple | 14 May 1935 | C-983-B | "Lead Pencil Blues (It Just Won't Write)" | Vocalion 03068 | 1935 |
| Johnnie Temple | 14 May 1935 | C-986-B | "Big Boat Whistle" | Vocalion 03068 | 1935 |
| Johnnie Temple | 14 May 1935 | C-985-B | "Morning Prayer Blues" | Vocalion (unissued) | — |
| Johnnie Temple | 14 May 1935 | C-988-B | "Cypress Grove Blues" | Vocalion (unissued) | — |
| Johnnie Temple | 12 November 1936 | 90980-A | "New Vicksburg Blues" | Decca 7244 | 1936 |
| Johnnie Temple | 12 November 1936 | 90981-A | "Louise Louise Blues" | Decca 7244 | 1936 |
| Johnnie Temple | 12 November 1936 | 90981-B | "Big Leg Woman" | Decca 7244 | 1936 |
| Johnnie Temple | 14 May 1937 | 91249-A | "Peepin' Through the Keyhole" | Decca 7316 | 1937 |
| Johnnie Temple | 14 May 1937 | 91251-A | "East St. Louis Blues" | Decca 7316 | 1937 |
| Johnnie Temple | 14 May 1937 | 91247-A | "So Lonely and Blue" | Decca 7337 | 1937 |
| Johnnie Temple | 14 May 1937 | 91248-A | "New Louise Louise Blues" | Decca 7337 | 1937 |
| Johnnie Temple and the Harlem Hamfats | 6 October 1937 | 62653-A | "Gimme Some of That Yum Yum Yum" | Decca 7385 | 1937 |
| Johnnie Temple and the Harlem Hamfats | 6 October 1937 | 62654-A | "Hoodoo Woman" | Decca 7385 | 1937 |
| Johnnie Temple and the Harlem Hamfats | 6 October 1937 | 62655-A | "Mama's Bad Luck Child" | Decca 7416 | 1937 |
| Johnnie Temple and the Harlem Hamfats | 14 May 1937 | 91246-A | "Snapping Cat" | Decca 7416 | 1937 |
| Johnnie Temple | 14 May 1937 | 91250-A | "Pimple Blues" | Decca 7444 | 1937 |
| Johnnie Temple | 6 October 1937 | 62656-A | "Mean Baby Blues" | Decca 7444 | 1937 |
| Johnnie Temple | 28 October 1937 | C-2046-2 | "Beale Street Sheik" | Vocalion (unissued) | — |
| Johnnie Temple | 28 October 1937 | C-2049-2 | "The Hoodoo Plan" | Vocalion (unissued) | — |
| Johnny Temple with the Harlem Hamfats | 22 April 1938 | 63670-A | "What Is That Smells Like Gravy" | Decca 7456 | 1938 |
| Johnny Temple with the Harlem Hamfats | 22 April 1938 | 63674-A | "County Jail Blues" | Decca 7456 | 1938 |
| Johnny Temple with the Harlem Hamfats | 22 April 1938 | 63671-A | "Every Dog Must Have His Day" | Decca 7495 | 1938 |
| Johnny Temple with the Harlem Hamfats | 22 April 1938 | 63672-A | "Fare You Well" | Decca 7495 | 1938 |
| Johnny Temple with the Harlem Hamfats | 22 April 1938 | 63673-A | "Stavin' Chain" | Decca 7532 | 1938 |
| Johnny Temple with the Harlem Hamfats | 22 April 1938 | 63675-A | "Gonna Ride 74" | Decca 7532 | 1938 |
| Johnny Temple | 17 October 1938 | 91520-A | "Big Leg Woman" | Decca 7547 | 1938 |
| Johnny Temple | 17 October 1938 | 91523-A | "Between Midnight and Dawn" | Decca 7547 | 1938 |

== Selected discography ==
| Year | Title | Genre | Label | Notes |
|---|---|---|---|---|
| 2003 | The Essential (original recording remastered) | Chicago blues | Classic Blues | 2 CDs, 36 tracks |
