= Roger Rabbit (disambiguation) =

Roger Rabbit is the title character in the fantasy comedy film, Who Framed Roger Rabbit (1988), directed by Robert Zemeckis.

Roger Rabbit may also refer to:

Printed media:

- Roger Rabbit (comic book), series by Disney Comics starring characters from the 1988 film, Who Framed Roger Rabbit
- Roger Rabbit: The Resurrection of Doom, a graphic novel
- Who Censored Roger Rabbit?, a mystery novel written by Gary Wolf in 1981, the basis for the movie

Other uses:

- Roger Rabbit's Car Toon Spin, a "dark" amusement ride at the Disneyland theme park in Anaheim, California and Tokyo Disneyland theme park, located in Urayasu, Chiba, Japan, near Tokyo
- The Bugs Bunny Crazy Castle, known as Roger Rabbit in Japan, released in 1989 for the Family Computer Disk System
- The Roger Rabbit (dance), a popular dance move in the early 1990s
- "Roger Rabbit", song by Sleeping with Sirens from If You Were a Movie, This Would Be Your Soundtrack (2012)

== See also ==
- List of Who Framed Roger Rabbit media
- Who Framed Roger Rabbit (disambiguation)
