= Who Framed Roger Rabbit (soundtrack) =

Who Framed Roger Rabbit (Original Motion Picture Soundtrack)

Soundtrack album by Alan Silvestri
- Released: June 22, 1988
- Recorded: April 1988
- Studio: CTS Studios, Wembley, London
- Genre: Jazz; film score
- Length: 45:56
- Label: Buena Vista; Walt Disney
- Producer: Alan Silvestri

Alan Silvestri chronology
Mac and Me (1988)	Who Framed Roger Rabbit (1988)	My Stepmother Is an Alien (1988)

Who Framed Roger Rabbit (Original Motion Picture Soundtrack) is the soundtrack album to the 1988 film Who Framed Roger Rabbit, directed by Robert Zemeckis and featured film score composed by regular Zemeckis collaborator Alan Silvestri, who conducted the London Symphony Orchestra. The musical score was heavily influenced on Carl W. Stalling's music composed for Looney Tunes. Apart from Silvestri's score, the film also features performances of "Hungarian Rhapsody", "Why Don't You Do Right?" by Amy Irving as Jessica Rabbit, "The Merry-Go-Round Broke Down" by Charles Fleischer as Roger Rabbit, and a choral version of "Smile, Darn Ya, Smile!" performed by the Toons.

The score was recorded at the CTS Studios in Wembley, London in April 1988. The soundtrack was originally released by Buena Vista Records on June 22, 1988, but immediately fell out of print after its release. It was reissued in April 2002, and since then the album saw multiple releases, including a 2018 Intrada Records' release of the film score in three-CD set, and two vinyl editions released by Mondo and Walt Disney Records in September 2019 and 2021.

The score received critical acclaim, while critics often citing it as one of "Silvestri's best scores in his career", and received Silvestri a nomination for Grammy Award for Best Score Soundtrack for Visual Media and Saturn Award for Best Music, but lost both awards to Ryuichi Sakamoto, David Byrne and Cong Su for their work in The Last Emperor (1987) and Christopher Young for Hellbound: Hellraiser II (1988).

== Release history ==
The album was first released by Buena Vista Records on June 22, 1988 in CD, LP and cassettes, and was again reissued in CDs on April 12, 2002, after the original album fell out of print. On January 26, 2018, Intrada Records' released a three-CD set, which includes the complete score from the film, alternates, remastered version of the original score in the first album, alongside music from three Roger Rabbit short films, composed and conducted by Bruce Broughton and James Horner. The album was reissued by Mondo and Walt Disney Records, for the official vinyl release. Mondo released the first vinyl edition of the soundtrack on September 6, 2019, which featured a 180-gram disc with pink, neon and white splatter colored edition. Another vinyl edition was released on September 10, 2021.

== Critical reception ==
The score has been critically acclaimed and assessed as one of Silvestri's best film scores composed. It has been listed by Den of Geek, in the eighth position of "Silvestri's 30 best soundtracks", where a review by Sean Wilson, stated "a marvel of instrumental complexity, and a personal score for Silvestri as he gets to return to his jazz roots". ClassicFM also listed it as one of "Silvestri's best film scores". Who Framed Roger Rabbit score has been considered as one of the best scores in the 1980s, by several outlets including, Variety, Far Out Magazine, MovieWeb, Collider, Flickering Myth, Empire Online and Entertainment Weekly.

Music critic Jonathan Broxton wrote "Who Framed Roger Rabbit is a landmark score in Alan Silvestri’s career, and should take pride of place in the collection of anyone who admires his music. His depiction of 1940s Hollywood through a series of original jazz pieces is wonderfully authentic, the inter-weaving character themes give the score intellectual depth, and the action writing is some of the best of Silvestri’s early career, especially when it combines his trademark orchestral flamboyance with the jazzy period riffs." Jeff Ames of Comingsoon.net called it as "a classic film score bursting with energy and playful themes made during a time when Silvestri was at the top of his game".

James Southall of Movie Wave wrote "The score is at its most coherent - and best, on album - during the far less frenetic sequences. Things are brought to a close in the madcap, end title suite, with blink-and-you'll-miss-them recaps of the major themes. It's a score that certainly has a number of fine moments, but it's just too frenetic to be consistently enjoyable. The good outweighs the bad enough for me to recommend it - Silvestri is a consistently impressive composer, after all - but good luck finding a copy!" Filmtracks.com wrote "the Silvestri score is a wild ride, as to be expected, but cartoon lovers will devour its shameless enthusiasm." Set the Tape wrote "Those who are fans of the composer are urged to get their hands on this release – it paints a Silvestri masterpiece in a whole new light."

== Track listing ==
=== Original soundtrack ===
No.	Title	Writer(s)	Artist(s)	Length
1.	"Maroon Logo"			0:19
2.	"Maroon Cartoon"			3:25
3.	"Valiant & Valiant"			4:22
4.	"The Weasels"			2:08
5.	"Hungarian Rhapsody" (Dueling Pianos)	Franz Liszt	Mel Blanc; Tony Anselmo	1:54
6.	"Judge Doom"			3:47
7.	"Why Don't You Do Right?"	Joseph McCoy	Amy Irving; Charles Fleischer	3:07
8.	"No Justice for Toons"			2:45
9.	"The Merry-Go-Round Broke Down" (Roger's Song)	Cliff Friend; Dave Franklin	Fleischer	0:47
10.	"Jessica's Theme"			2:03
11.	"Toontown"			4:44
12.	"Eddie's Theme"			5:22
13.	"The Gag Factory"			3:49
14.	"The Will"			1:10
15.	"Smile, Darn Ya, Smile! / That's All Folks"	Charles O'Flynn; Jack Meskill; Max Rich; Friend; Franklin	Fleischer; Toon Chorus	1:18
16.	"End Title" (Who Framed Roger Rabbit)			4:56
Total length:				45:56

=== Complete score (Intrada edition) ===
Disc 1
No.	Title	Writer(s)	Artist(s)	Length
1.	"Main Title"			0:30
2.	"Maroon Toon Logo"			0:18
3.	"Cartoon"			4:01
4.	"Hitch-Hike"			2:17
5.	"Cloverleaf"			1:05
6.	"Hungarian Rhapsody No. 2"	Liszt		2:57
7.	"Why Don't You Do Right?"	McCoy	Irving; Fleischer	3:04
8.	"Eddie Breaks In"			1:28
9.	"Patty Cake"			0:53
10.	"The Eye"			0:13
11.	"I Needed That / Work Here Finished"			1:20
12.	"Valiant & Valiant"			2:07
13.	"Fire In The Hatch / Scene Of The Crime"			1:06
14.	"Shoes On The Loose"			0:33
15.	"Judge Doom / Looking For A Murder"			4:05
16.	"The Weasels"			2:20
17.	"The Glass"			1:07
18.	"Strange Bedfellows"			2:44
19.	"Toon Patrol / Search The Place"			3:23
20.	"I'm A Pawn"			2:00
21.	"The Merry-Go-Round Broke Down" (Roger's Song)	Friend; Franklin	Fleischer	0:44
22.	"But I'm A Toon / Looking For Murderer"			4:38
23.	"Execution"			1:46
24.	"Got Ya, Kid"			2:59
25.	"Toon Killed My Brother"			1:16
26.	"Have A Good Man"			0:17
27.	"R.K. Maroon"			4:03
28.	"The Getaway"			2:49
29.	"Toontown"			6:07
30.	"Acme Factory / Roger Fanfare / Ton O' Bricks"			5:16
31.	"Start The Dip"			2:09
Total length:				69:35

Disc 2
No.	Title	Writer(s)	Artist(s)	Length
1.	"Eddie's Theme"			5:17
2.	"The Merry-Go-Round Broke Down" (Instrumental)			2:09
3.	"The Kick / The Climbing"			2:02
4.	"Toon Magnet"			0:25
5.	"Steamroller"			5:43
6.	"Hole In The Wall"			0:46
7.	"Saved"			2:56
8.	"Big Kiss / Smile, Darn Ya, Smile!"	O'Flynn; Meskill; Rich; (Smile, Darn Ya, Smile!)	Fleischer	2:03
9.	"End Credits – Roger Rabbit Medley" (Film version)			6:32
10.	"Maroon Toon Logo" (Without Logo Slide)			0:17
11.	"Hollywood 1947"			1:00
12.	"I'm A Pawn" (Alternate)			2:00
13.	"Toon Killed My Brother" (Alternate #1)			1:18
14.	"Toon Killed My Brother" (Alternate #2)			0:54
15.	"Trumpet Fanfare"			0:04
16.	"Hole In The Wall" (Alternate)			0:19
17.	"Saved" (Alternate)			2:41
18.	"Rollercoaster Rabbit (Note: features the song "Orange Blossom Special" from Johnny Cash's album used in the Roger Rabbit short film Rollercoaster Rabbit, the song was derived from the short's title.)"	Ervin T. Rouse; Bruce Broughton		6:37
19.	"Trail Mix-Up (Note: features Jaws theme from Jaws (1975), composed by John Williams.)"	Broughton		8:21
20.	"Tummy Trouble"	James Horner		6:47
Total length:				58:11

Disc 3
No.	Title	Writer(s)	Length
1.	"Maroon Logo"		0:17
2.	"Maroon Cartoon"		3:21
3.	"Valiant & Valiant"		4:19
4.	"The Weasels"		2:04
5.	"Hungarian Rhapsody" (Dueling Pianos)	Liszt	1:40
6.	"Judge Doom"		3:48
7.	"Why Don't You Do Right?"		3:02
8.	"No Justice For Toons"		2:40
9.	"The Merry-Go-Round Broke Down" (Roger's Song)	Friend; Franklin	0:45
10.	"Jessica's Theme"		2:01
11.	"Toontown"		4:40
12.	"Eddie's Theme"		5:18
13.	"The Gag Factory"		3:54
14.	"The Will"		1:06
15.	"Smile, Darn Ya, Smile / That's All, Folks!"	O'Flynn; Meskill; Rich; Friend; Franklin	1:15
16.	"End Title"		4:56
Total length:			45:06

== Personnel ==
Credits adapted from Allmusic

- David Bifano – production assistant
- David Braucher – design
- Chuck Domanico – bass
- Jerry Hey – trumpet
- Kenneth Karman – music editor
- London Symphony Orchestra – orchestra
- Sue Mallet – contractor
- Harvey Mason, Sr. – drums
- Steve Price – assistant Engineer
- Dennis Sands – engineer
- Stephen Schaefer – drums
- Tom Scott – saxophone
- Alan Silvestri – composer, arranger, conductor, producer
- Chet Swiatkowski – piano
- Randy Waldman – piano

== Accolades ==
Award	Category	Nominee(s)	Result
BMI Film & TV Awards	Film Music Award	Alan Silvestri	Won
Grammy Awards	Best Album of Original Instrumental Background Score Written for a Motion Picture or Television	Alan Silvestri	Nominated
Grammy Awards	Best Instrumental Composition	Alan Silvestri ("Who Framed Roger Rabbit Suite")	Nominated
Saturn Awards	Best Music	Alan Silvestri	Nominated
