= If You're a Viper =

Jazz song composed by Stuff Smith

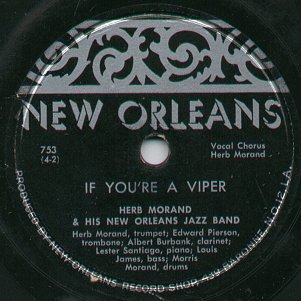
Herb Morand recording of Viper, late 1940s

"If You're a Viper" (originally released under the title "You'se a Viper", and sometimes titled "If You'se a Viper") is a jazz song composed by Stuff Smith. It was first recorded by Smith and his Onyx Club Boys in 1936 and released as the b-side to the song "After You've Gone".

The song was a hit for Smith and is one of the most frequently covered songs about marijuana smoking in American popular music. In its early history the song was identified with Rosetta Howard's 1937 recording and sometimes still is. Howard slowed the song's tempo considerably, and rewrote significant portions of the vocal melody (for example, the line "bust your conk on peppermint candy"). Fats Waller, who recorded the song in 1943 for a V-Disc session, closely followed the Howard arrangement, and his version, which has been commercially released numerous times since the 1950s, has kept the song in circulation. Waller's track is also a small footnote in the story of Harry J. Anslinger's efforts to prosecute jazz musicians for smoking marijuana during World War II.

== Recording history and impact ==
Jazz trumpeter Jonah Jones performed the vocals on the first Stuff Smith recording. The song captures some of the slang and culture surrounding marijuana smoking in the US jazz scene in the 1920s and 1930s. "Viper" was Harlem slang for a pot smoker at the time and the song has numerous marijuana references. Edward Jablonski wrote that the term was inspired "by the hissing intake of smoke" and Russel Cronin wrote, "Conjure the image of the hissing viper for a second: taking a swift, sly suck on a skinny little joint. A viper is a toker, which practically all jazz musicians were, and the viper songs celebrated a new social hero."

Smith's song was not the only one to refer to Viper culture in the 1930s. Waller had a stride-piano piece of his own called "Viper's Drag" (earlier recorded in 1930 by Cab Calloway and His Orchestra). Sidney Bechet wrote and recorded "Viper Mad" and Fletcher Allen's "Viper's Dream" later gained a wide audience when it was recorded by Django Reinhardt in France.

The song's lyrics also point to the way interest in jazz music and black culture more generally were slowly breaking down cultural barriers in early 20th century America. Though later recordings often render the first two lines of the song as Think about a reefer, 5 feet long/Not too heavy, not too strong both Smith's original recording and Fats Waller's more famous 1943 cut have the second line as Mighty Mezz, and not too strong. "Mighty Mezz" refers to Milton Mezzrow, a Jewish saxophone and clarinet player who became enamored with black American culture while playing in the speakeasies of prohibition-era Chicago. The self-described "voluntary negro" moved to Harlem after prohibition ended, and in his early years there was known more for his drug-dealing than his playing. The stronger Mexican marijuana that he introduced to the jazz scene in Harlem came to be known simply as "Mezz." As Mezzrow later put it: "Some of our musician pals used to stick these hip phrases into their songs when they broadcast over the radio, because they knew we'd be huddled around the radio in the Barbeque and that was their way of saying hello to me and all the vipers. That mellow Mexican leaf really started something in Harlem."

== Waller's Viper ==
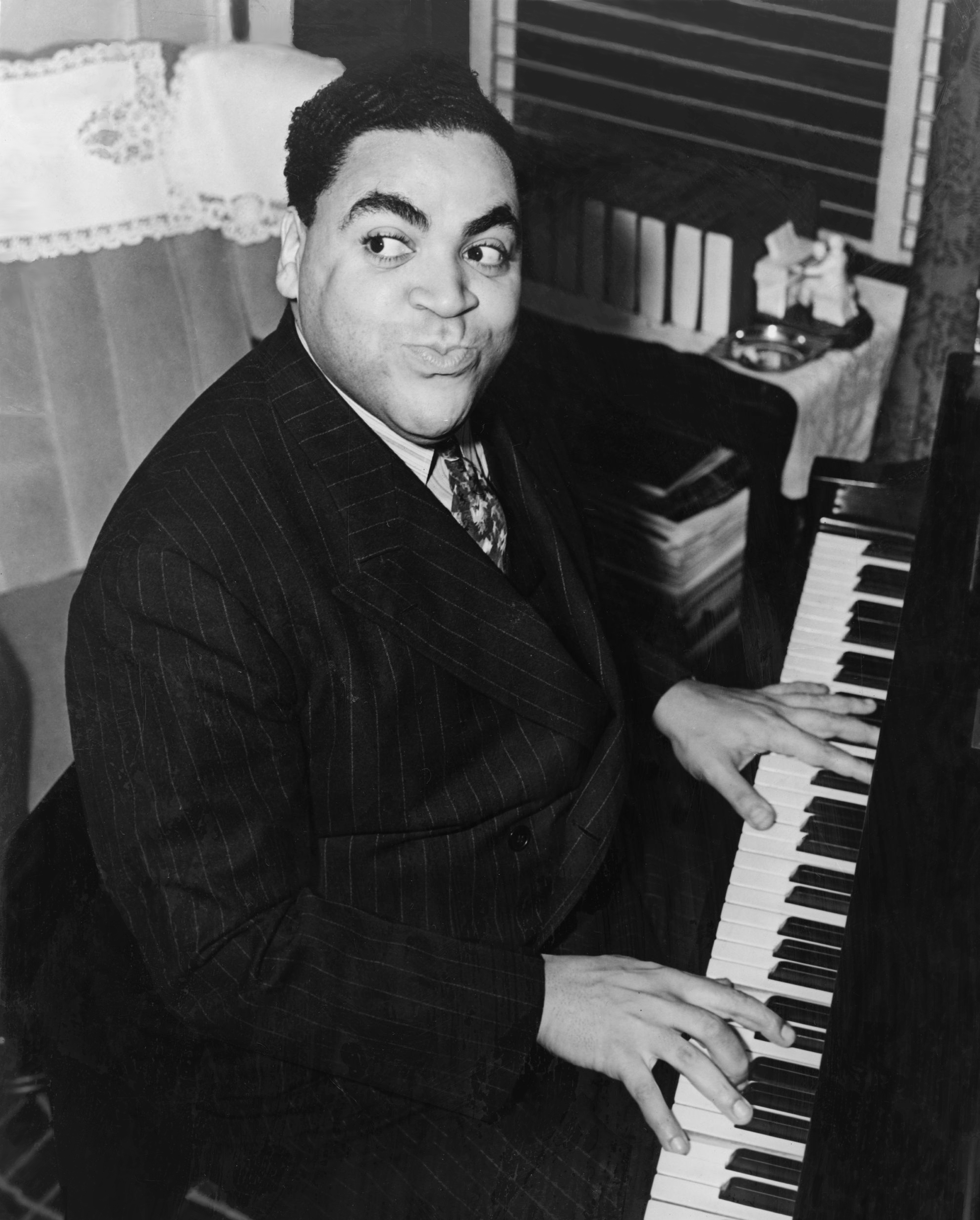
Fats Waller in 1938

Waller's 1943 recording of the song (titled "The Reefer Song" in its eventual release) was a subtle poke at Harry Anslinger, the first head of the Federal Bureau of Narcotics, who had declared marijuana use by swing musicians a menace and had promised to prosecute. During World War II it was harder to get American records pressed, because of a shellac shortage created by the war effort. But in 1943 Armed Forces Radio frequently invited jazz musicians to play for the troops overseas and made "V-Discs" ("Victory Discs") for distribution as a morale booster.

=== Extended play ===
The "V-Disc" program began during a musicians strike that was leaving America's biggest stars idle, and the Army leaned on the musicians union to make an exception for the V-Discs, which they did. Lt. George Robert Vincent, a sound engineer then working for the Armed Forces Radio Service, conceived the V-Disc program and convinced the army to put up $1 million for the effort. Due to the shellac shortage, the V-Discs were recorded on a new material, vinylite (a precursor to the vinyl that would become standard in the recording industry), that allowed for narrower grooves. The discs were also pressed at 12 inches rather than 10, the industry standard at the time. These two factors left V-Discs with about six minutes per side (rather than the more typical 3–4 minutes), which gave musicians the ability to record an additional song, or play an extended take, or banter with their unseen audience.

=== Waller's session ===
Waller recorded a V-Disc a little over two-weeks after Anslinger vowed to go after pot-smoking musicians (he and others believed that some musicians were deliberately smoking marijuana to obtain "drug addict" deferments to avoid the draft). Waller decided to use the occasion as a way to reflect his puckish contempt for the man. "The reefer cats were aware of their outcast status; in fact, they seemed to relish it. They had created a self-contained culture, and squares like Anslinger were no match," Larry Sloman writes in Reefer madness: the history of marijuana in America. "This brash disdain for the square world's imperatives was nowhere demonstrated more clearly than in the conduct of Fats Waller."

In response to Anslinger's calls for "swing band" arrests Waller decided to record "If You're a Viper," and included an intro that threw only the thinnest of veils over the song's subject. "Hey, cats, it's four o'clock in the mornin'. I just left the V-Disc studio. Here we are in Harlem. Everybody's here but the police, and they'll be here any minute. It's high time, so catch this song," Waller says. "The gumshoes at the Bureau and the Army brass let that one slip right by them, but the guys in the barracks caught the drift, especially those stationed in the Philippines, where the weed was said to be excellent," Sloman writes.

Strong evidence, however, suggests Sloman is wrong that the tune slipped past the censors and it seems likely the recording did not become public until after the war. An article in Goldmine, a magazine for record collectors, says the army did not press the Viper recording for release to the troops. "Ain't Misbehavin'" got pressed, but not "You're A Viper (The Reefer Song)," it says. The article goes on to quote the sound engineer for the session, Ed DiGiannantonio: "We did the session with Fats Waller... When he first got to the studio, he demanded a bottle of VAT-69, which is not hair tonic. And he started playing the piano, and he was okay for a while. Then he consumed the second bottle, and out of the 22 songs, we only used about 8 or 9 of them, because he got very sloppy and started using a few words you shouldn't use." Duty, Honor, Applause, a book about US entertainers during WWII, also strongly implies that Viper did not make the cut. "Jazz legend Fats Waller recorded 22 songs for V-Discs, but only nine were deemed usable. Censors thought the other thirteen "too risque for young GI's ears,' wrote Gregory Spears in a December 23, 1990, article for the Houston Chronicle. "Waller plied himself with a bottle of Vat-69 Scotch during each recording session, and the drunker he got, the more suggestive his songs became. His last recordings... included "The Reefer Song," an ode to marijuana."

== Legacy and modern recordings ==
A 2006 article in the Austin Chronicle about the history of American marijuana songs is titled "If You're a Viper" and refers to the eponymous tune as "the king of all pot songs." The song has been covered by Dave Van Ronk, the Jim Kweskin Jug Band, Bobby Short, Wayne Kramer, Kermit Ruffins, Widespread Panic, Ekoostik Hookah, country musician Wayne Hancock, Alex Chilton, The Manhattan Transfer, Erin McKeown, and others. High Times magazine ranked Viper number 14 among the 25 Pot Songs of All Time in 2002. The writer Maya Angelou recalled her mother, who did not smoke the stuff herself, often singing Viper as a way of pointing out the prevalence and acceptance of marijuana smoking in the "black ghetto" in the 1930s and 1940s. In Nathanael West's 1939 novel The Day of the Locust, the character Faye Greener sings the song while drunk.
