= Papa Charlie McCoy =

American Delta blues musician and songwriter (1909–1950)

- McCoy with his mandolin

Background information
- Also known as: Tampa Kid; The Mississippi Mudder
- Born: Charles McCoy; May 26, 1911; Jackson, Mississippi, U.S.
- Died: July 26, 1950 (aged 39) Chicago, Illinois, U.S.
- Genre: Delta blues
- Occupations: Musician; songwriter
- Instruments: Guitar; vocals; mandolin; banjo
- Years active: 1930s–1940s

Charles "Papa Charlie" McCoy (May 26, 1909 – July 26, 1950) was an American Delta blues musician and songwriter.

== Career ==
McCoy's grave at Restvale Cemetery

McCoy was born in Jackson, Mississippi. He was best known by his nickname, Papa Charlie. As a guitarist and mandolin player, he was one of the major blues accompanists of his time. He played in the Mississippi area with his band, the Mississippi Hot Footers. As a slide guitarist, he recorded under the name Tampa Kid, releasing "Keep on Trying". He and his older brother Kansas Joe McCoy performed together in the 1930s and 1940s and recorded as the McCoy Brothers.

McCoy and Bo Carter recorded several sides as the Mississippi Mud Steppers, including two variations of Cow Cow Davenport's "Cow Cow Blues": the first, an instrumental, was released as "The Jackson Stomp", and the second, with lyrics and vocals by McCoy, as "The Lonesome Train, That Took My Girl from Town". They also wrote and recorded "The Vicksburg Stomp" (a version of which was recorded by the mandolinists Mike Compton and David Long in 2006).

McCoy moved to Chicago, where he organized two bands, both with his brother Kansas Joe—Papa Charlie's Boys and the Harlem Hamfats—which performed and recorded in the late 1930s.

McCoy's career was cut short by his service with the United States Army during World War II. In poor health after the war, he never returned to music. He died in Chicago in 1950 from "paralytic brain disease", only a few months after his brother died. Both are buried in the Restvale Cemetery, in Alsip, Illinois.

Several cover versions of McCoy's composition "Too Long" have been released.

== See also ==
- List of blues musicians
- List of Delta blues musicians
- List of people from Mississippi
