= Lil Green =

American singer-songwriter

Background information
- Born: Lillie May Johnson or Lillian Green; December 22, 1901; Port Gibson, Mississippi, United States
- Died: April 14, 1954 (aged 52) Chicago, Illinois, United States
- Genre: Blues
- Occupation: Singer
- Labels: Bluebird; Atlantic (1951–54)

Lil Green (probably born Lillie May Johnson; December 22, 1901 (some sources give 1905, 1910 or 1919) (Note: Some older sources give 1919 as her year of birth. However, Bob Eagle and Eric S. LeBlanc gave the date as 1901, on the basis of information in the 1910 census. A Social Security claim, apparently for her, states that she was born on December 22, 1910, in Port Gibson, Mississippi. Her headstone gives the year 1905.) – April 14, 1954) was an American classic female blues singer and songwriter.

Green was nicknamed the "Queen of the Blues" and was among the leading female rhythm and blues singers of the 1940s, with a sensual soprano voice. Gospel singer R.H. Harris lauded her voice, and her interpretation of religious songs.

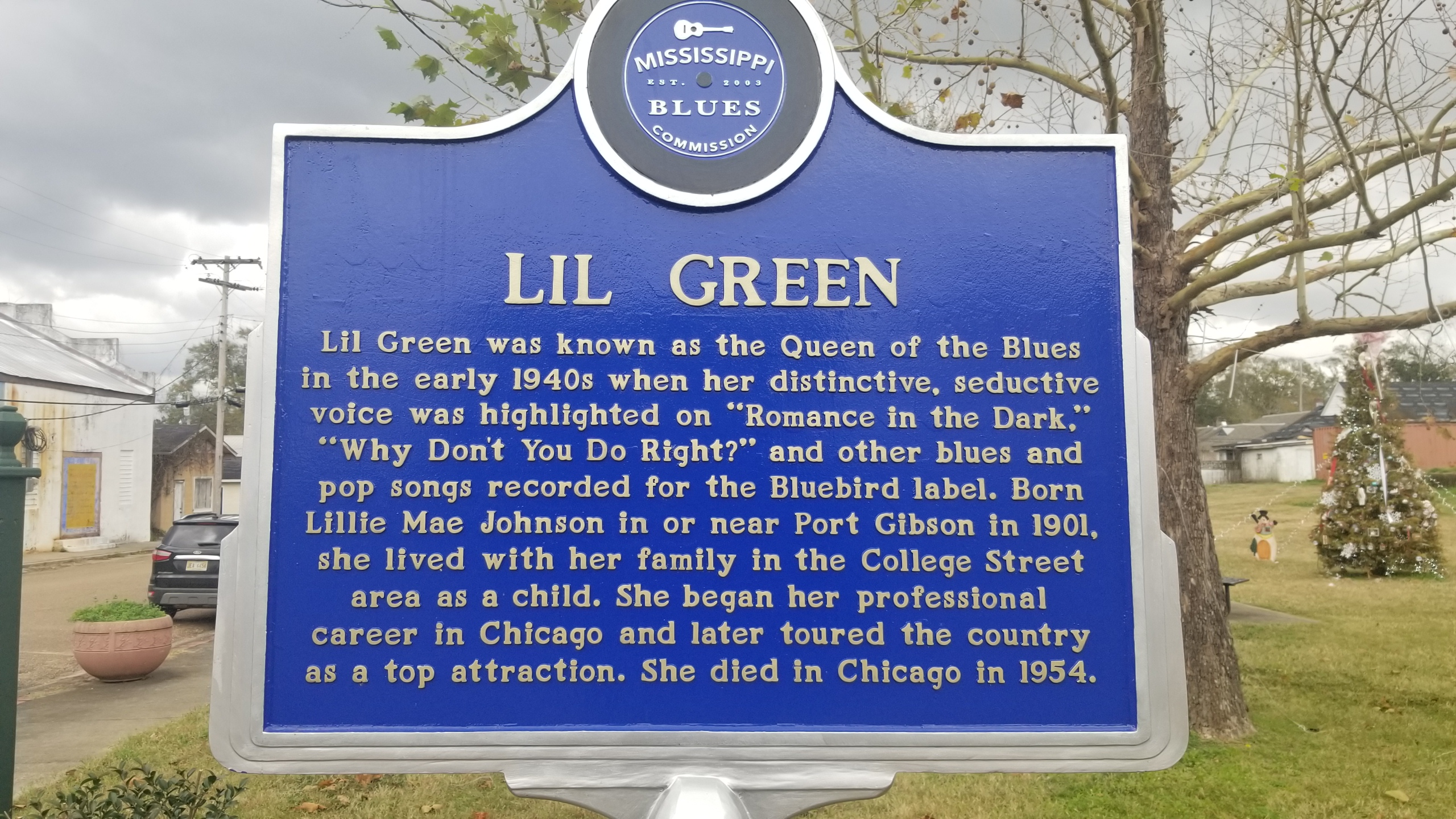
Lil Green - Mississippi Blues Trail Marker

== Biography ==
=== Early life ===
Originally named Lillian Green or Lillie May Johnson, she was born in Port Gibson, Mississippi. After the early deaths of her parents, she began performing in her teens and, having honed her craft in the church performing gospel, she sang in Mississippi jukes.

=== Music career ===
Green headed to Chicago, Illinois, in 1929, where she would make all of her recordings.

She was noted for superb timing and a distinctively sinuous voice. In the 1930s, she and Big Bill Broonzy had a nightclub act together.

In 1940, she recorded her first session for the Bluebird budget subsidiary label of RCA Victor. Her two biggest hits were her own composition "Romance in the Dark" (1940), which was later covered by many artists, such as Dinah Washington and Nina Simone (in 1967) (Billie Holiday recorded a different song with the same title), and Green's 1941 version of Kansas Joe McCoy's minor-key blues- and jazz-influenced song "Why Don't You Do Right?", which was recorded by Peggy Lee in 1942 and by many others since.

As well as performing in Chicago nightclubs, Green toured with Tiny Bradshaw and other bands but never broke away from the black theatre circuit.

By 1949, Green had changed direction with the foresight to become a jazz vocalist, and tried to emulate the jazz style of Billie Holiday. She signed with Atlantic Records in 1951, but at this point was already in poor health.

She died of pneumonia in Chicago in April 1954 and was buried in Oak Hill Cemetery, in Gary, Indiana.

== See also ==
- List of blues musicians
- List of classic female blues singers
