= Frankie Jaxon =

African American vaudeville singer and comedian (c. 1896–1953)

Frankie "Half-Pint" Jaxon, born Frank Devera Jackson (March 3, 1896 or 1897 – May 15, 1953), was an African American vaudeville singer, stage designer and comedian, popular in the 1920s and 1930s.

== Life and career ==
He was born in Montgomery, Alabama, orphaned, and raised in Kansas City, Missouri. His nickname of "Half Pint" referred to his 5'2" height. He started in show business around 1910 as a singer in Kansas City, before travelling extensively with medicine shows in Texas, and then touring the eastern seaboard. His feminine voice and outrageous manner, often as a female impersonator, established him as a crowd favorite. By 1917 he had begun working regularly in Atlantic City, New Jersey and in Chicago, often with such performers as Bessie Smith and Ethel Waters, whose staging he helped design.

He served slightly less than a year in the United States Army in 1918–1919 and rose to the rank of sergeant. In the late 1920s he sang with top jazz bands when they passed through Chicago, working with Bennie Moten, King Oliver, Freddie Keppard and others. He performed and recorded with the pianists Cow Cow Davenport, Tampa Red and "Georgia Tom" Dorsey, recording with the latter pair under the name of The Black Hillbillies. He also recorded with the Harlem Hamfats. In the 1930s, he was often on radio in the Chicago area, and led his own band, titled Frankie "Half Pint" Jaxon and His Quarts of Joy.

Jaxon appeared with Duke Ellington in a film short titled Black and Tan (1929), and with Bessie Smith in "St. Louis Blues" (1929). Cab Calloway's "Minnie the Moocher" (1931) is based both musically and lyrically on Jaxon's "Willie the Weeper" (1927).

In 1941 he retired from show business and worked at The Pentagon in Washington, D.C. He was transferred to Los Angeles. According to most sources, he died in the veterans hospital in 1944; Allmusic states he lived in Los Angeles until 1970. However, an application for a headstone as a military veteran, in the name of Frank Devera Jackson, has been suggested by writer Brian Berger as referring to him; it indicates that he died on May 15, 1953.

== Song lyric ==
"If this song's too hot," sang Frankie Jaxon in "Fan It", "go out and buy yourself a five cent fan."

== See also ==
- List of East Coast blues musicians
