= Viper Mad =

Single by Sidney "Pops" Bechet
- B-side: "Sweet Patootie"
- Released: 1924
- Genre: Jazz
- Label: Brunswick
- Songwriters: Sidney Bechet; Rousseau Simmons

"Viper Mad" is a composition by Sidney Bechet and Rousseau Simmons; it is also known as "Pleasure Mad".

Sheet music for the composition was published in 1924 as "Pleasure Mad", performed by vocalist Blossom Seeley. It was recorded by another vocalist, Ethel Waters, early that year. Another version from 1924 was by Maureen Englin, with Bechet accompanying on soprano saxophone with pianist Art Sorenson, but the track was unreleased. The composition was played very frequently in the 1920s, and was "virtually a jazz standard of the day".

Bechet himself recorded a version as leader in 1938, with Noble Sissle's Orchestra. This track, with O'Neill Spencer on vocals, features a modulating break to A-flat from G, a trumpet solo by Clarence Brereton and another Bechet modulation, to D-flat. The 1938 Bechet version was used in the Woody Allen film Sweet and Lowdown.

As "Viper Mad", the lyrics celebrate marijuana use, so it is listed among jazz songs, mainly of the 1930s, that were on the same topic. A "viper" was a marijuana smoker, because of the hissing sound of inhalation. The lyrics include: "Wrap your chops round this stick of tea / Blow this gage and get high with me / Good tea is my weakness, I know it's bad / It sends me, gate, and I can't wait, I'm viper mad".
