= Kansas Joe McCoy =

American Delta blues musician and singer-songwriter (1905–1950)

- Also known as: Kansas Joseph Allen McCoy
- Born: Wilbur Joe McCoy; May 11, 1905; Raymond, Mississippi, U.S.
- Died: January 28, 1950 (aged 44) Chicago, Illinois, U.S.
- Genres: Blues; Delta blues
- Occupations: Musician; songwriter
- Instruments: Guitar; vocals
- Years active: 1920s–1940s

Wilbur Joe "Kansas Joe" McCoy (May 11, 1905 – January 28, 1950) was an American Delta blues singer, musician and songwriter.

== Career ==
McCoy performed under various stage names but is best known as Kansas Joe McCoy. Born in Raymond, Mississippi, he was the older brother of the blues accompanist Papa Charlie McCoy. As a young man, McCoy was drawn to the music scene in Memphis, Tennessee, where he played guitar and sang during the 1920s. He teamed up his with future wife, Lizzie Douglas, a guitarist better known as Memphis Minnie, and their 1930 recording of the song "Bumble Bee" for Columbia Records was a hit. In 1930, the couple moved to Chicago, where they were an important part of the burgeoning blues scene there. After they were divorced, McCoy teamed up with his brother to form the Harlem Hamfats, a band that performed and recorded during the second half of the 1930s.

In 1936, the Harlem Hamfats released their recording of the song "The Weed Smoker's Dream". McCoy later refined the tune, changed the lyrics and retitled the song "Why Don't You Do Right?" for Lil Green, who recorded it in 1941. It was covered a year later by both Benny Goodman and Peggy Lee, becoming Lee's first hit single. "Why Don't You Do Right?" remains a jazz standard and is McCoy's most enduring composition.

At the outbreak of World War II Charlie McCoy entered the military, but a heart condition kept Joe McCoy from service. He formed a band, Big Joe and his Rhythm, which performed during most of the 1940s. The band featured Robert Nighthawk on harmonica and Charlie McCoy on mandolin.

== Death and legacy ==
McCoy's grave at Restvale Cemetery

McCoy died of heart disease in Chicago in 1950, at the age of 44, only a few months before Charlie died. They are both buried in Restvale Cemetery, in Alsip, Illinois.

Led Zeppelin vocalist Robert Plant took a recording of "When the Levee Breaks", by McCoy and Memphis Minnie, which was in his personal collection, to guitarist Jimmy Page, who revamped the music, and the band recorded it, with most of the original lyrics, for Led Zeppelin's 1971 album, Led Zeppelin IV. Neither writer was credited on the original album but Minnie was given credit on later pressings.

McCoy's songs have also been covered by Skip James, Bob Dylan, John Mellencamp, the Ink Spots, Ella Fitzgerald, Jo Ann Kelly, Cleo Laine and A Perfect Circle.

== Pseudonyms ==
McCoy also performed and recorded under the names Bill Wither, Georgia Pine Boy, Hallelujah Joe, Big Joe McCoy and His Washboard Band, and the Mississippi Mudder. He also used the names Hamfoot Ham, Hillbilly Plowboy, and Mud Dauber Joe.

== Posthumous recognition ==
Like many blues musicians of his era, Joe McCoy's grave site was originally unmarked. A tribute concert was held in October 2010 to celebrate the music of Joe and Charlie McCoy and to buy gravestones for each of them; they were installed on May 31, 2011.

== See also ==
- Chicago blues
- List of blues musicians
- List of Chicago blues musicians
- List of people from Mississippi
