= Herb Morand =

American jazz trumpeter (1905–1952)

Herbert Morand (1905 – February 23, 1952) was an American jazz trumpeter, associated with the New Orleans jazz scene.

Morand began on trumpet at age eleven after hearing King Oliver. He played with Nat Towles in New Orleans, then moved to New York City and played with Cliff Jackson. After returning to New Orleans, he played with Chris Kelly, then went to Chicago and played with the Beale Street Washboard Band aside Johnny Dodds in 1929. He played with Harlem Hamfats from 1935 to 1938 and was their main soloist; this versatile ensemble played blues, New Orleans-style jazz, swing jazz, and country music.

In 1941 Morand returned to New Orleans, where he led his own band, and joined George Lewis's ensemble from 1948 to 1950. He recorded again as a leader in 1949–50, but retired due to illness, and died in 1952.
