= The Chocolate Dandies (jazz combos) =

Several American jazz combos from 1928 through the 1940s

The Chocolate Dandies was the name of several American jazz combos from 1928 through the 1940s. The name was an outgrowth of a Broadway production, The Chocolate Dandies, that debuted in 1924. That stage show was composed by Eubie Blake and Noble Sissle

== Bands ==
The first band to record with the name Chocolate Dandies, on the Okeh label in 1928–1929, was the one led by Don Redman, effectively the McKinney's Cotton Pickers under another name. In 1931 King Oliver and Lloyd Smith's Gut-Bucketeers recorded under the same name for Vocalion Records .

=== Don Redman ===
1. The Chocolate Dandies
  Musicians: Langston Curl (1899–1991), John Nesbitt (1900–1935) (de) (trumpets); Claude Jones (trombone); Don Redman, Milton Senior (1900–1948) (alto saxes, clarinets); George Thomas (1902–1930), Prince Robinson (tenor saxes, clarinets); Todd Rhodes (piano); Dave Wilborn (banjo); Lonnie Johnson (guitar on "Paducah" and "Star Dust"); Ralph Escudero (tuba); Cuba Austin (drums); Redman, Thomas, Wilborn (vocal trio on "Four or Five Times")
  Recorded October 13, 1928, New York City
  1. "Paducah," by Redman (music), Okeh 8627, Matrix: 401218-B
  2. "Star Dust," by Hoagy Carmichael, Okeh 8668, Matrix: 401219-A
  3. "Birmingham Breakdown," by Duke Ellington, Okeh 8668, Matrix: 401220-B
  4. "Four or Five Times," by Marco Hellman (words) and Byron Gay (music), Okeh 8627, Matrix: 401221-A

=== King Oliver ===
5. King Oliver and the Chocolate Dandies (more recently, for most discographers King Oliver was not present on this session)
  Musicians: Ward Pinkett (trumpet, vocals); unknown (trumpet); Fernando Arbello (trombone); Fred Skerritt (alto sax, vocals); Henry Jones (alto sax); Bingie Madison (tenor, vocal); Gene Rodgers (piano); Goldie Lucas (banjo, vocals); Richard Fullbright (tuba); Bill Beason (drums)
  Recorded April 15, 1931, 1:30–4:30 pm, New York
  1. "Loveless Love" (Madison, Skerritt, Lucas; vocals), Vocalion 1610, Matrix: E-36474-A
  2. "One More Time" (Madison, Skerritt, Lucas; vocals), Matrix: E-36625-A
  3. "When I Take My Sugar To Tea," by Sammy Fain, Irving Kahal, Pierre Norman (Pinkett; vocalist), Vocalion 1617, Matrix: E-36626-A

=== Benny Carter ===
Benny Carter had several ensembles in the 1930s named The Chocolate Dandies.

2. The Little Chocolate Dandies; OCLC 971979418, 28090642
  Musicians: Rex Stewart (cornet); Leonard Davis (trumpet); J. C. Higginbotham (trombone); Don Redman (clarinet on "Six or Seven Times;", alto sax, vocals on "That's How I Fell Today"); Benny Carter (alto sax, vocal); Coleman Hawkins (tenor sax); Fats Waller (piano, celeste in "That's How I Feel Today"); Bobby Johnson (banjo); Cyrus St. Clair (tuba); George Stafford (drums); unknown vocalist on "Six or Seven Times"
  Recorded September 18, 1929, New York
  1. "That's How I Feel Today," by Don Redman (unissued), Matrix: 402965-A
  2. "That's How I Feel Today" (unissued), Matrix: 402965-B
  3. "That's How I Feel Today" Okeh 8728, Matrix: 402965-C
  4. "Six or Seven Times," by Fats Waller & Irving Mills (unissued), Matrix: 402966-A
  5. "Six or Seven Times" (unissued), Matrix: 402966-B
  6. "Six or Seven Times" (unissued), Matrix: 402966-C
  7. "Six or Seven Times" Okeh 8728, Matrix: 402966-D
3. The Chocolate Dandies
  Musicians: Bobby Stark (trumpet), Jimmy Harrison (trombone, vocals), Benny Carter (clarinet, alto sax, vocals), Coleman Hawkins (tenor sax), Horace Henderson (piano); Benny Jackson (guitar); John Kirby (bass on "Goodbye Blues," tuba on the December 31 session)
  1. "Goodbye Blues," Carter (vocals and arrangement), Columbia 35679, Matrix: 404566-A
  Add Fletcher Henderson
  Recorded December 8, 1930
  2. "We're Friends Again" (unissued), Brunswick
  3. "What Good Am I Without You?" (unissued), Brunswick
  Recorded December 31, 1930, New York
  4. "Cloudy Skies," by Coleman Hawkins, Columbia 35679, Matrix: 404596-B
  5. "Got Another Sweetie Now," by Harrison (Harrison, vocals; arranged by Carter), Columbia 36009, Matrix: 404597-B
  6. "Bugle Call Rag" by Jack Pettis, Billy Meyers, and Elmer Schoebel (arranged by Carter), Columbia 2543-D, Matrix: 404598-B
  7. "Dee Blues," by Carter (Carter plays clarinet; arranged by Carter), Columbia 2543-D, Matrix: 404599-B
4. The Chocolate Dandies
  Musicians: Max Kaminsky (trumpet); Benny Carter (trumpet, alto sax, arrangement); Floyd O'Brien (trombone); Chu Berry (tenor sax); Teddy Wilson (piano); Lawrence "Larry" Lucie (guitar); Ernest Hill (bass); Sidney Catlett (drums); Mezz Mezzrow (drums on "Blue Interlude" only)
  Recorded October 10, 1933, New York
  1. "Blue Interlude," by Carter, Parlophone R1792, Matrix: 265156-2
  2. "I Never Knew," by Gus Kahn & Ted Fio Rito (Carter plays trumpet and also sax), Parlophone (E)R1815, Matrix: 265157-1
  3. "I Never Knew" (Carter plays trumpet and also sax), Phontastic (Swd)7647, Matrix: 265157-2
  4. "Once Upon a Time," by Carter (Carter plays trumpet and also sax), Parlophone (E)R1717, Matrix: 265158-1
  5. "Krazy Kapers," by Carter (Carter plays trumpet and also sax), Parlophone (E)R1743, Matrix: 265159-

=== Coleman Hawkins ===
6. Coleman Hawkins and The Chocolate Dandies
  Musicians: Roy Eldridge (trumpet), Benny Carter (alto saxophone), Coleman Hawkins (tenor saxophone), Count Basie (piano), Bernard Addison (guitar), John Kirby (bass), Sidney Catlett (drums)
  Recorded May 25, 1940, New York
  1. "Smack," Mosaic MR23-123, Matrix: R2995-T
  2. "Smack," Mosaic MR23-123, Matrix: R2995-1
  3. "Smack," Mosaic MR23-123, Matrix: R2995-2
  4. "Smack," Matrix: R2995-3
  5. "Smack," Commodore FL20025, Matrix: R2995-2
  6. "Smack," Commodore 533, Matrix: R2995
  7. "I Surrender Dear," Commodore 1506, Matrix: R2996
  8. "I Surrender Dear," (composite) Atlantic SD2-306, Matrix: R2996-2/1
  9. "I Surrender Dear," (original) Mosaic MR23-123, Matrix: R2996-2
  10. "I Surrender Dear," Mosaic MR23-123, Matrix: R2996-3
  11. "I Can't Believe That You're In Love With Me," Commodore 1506, Matrix: R2997
  12. "I Can't Believe That You're In Love With Me," Commodore XFL14936, Matrix: R2997-1
  13. "Dedication" (Eldridge, Carter: out), Commodore 533, Matrix: R2998
  14. "Dedication" (Eldridge, Carter: out), Mosaic MR23-123, Matrix: R2998-1
  15. "Dedication" (Eldridge, Carter: out), Mosaic MR23-123, Matrix: R2998-2

=== Others ===
Versions of groups' names "Chocolate Dandies" continued to play into the 1940s and counted among their members Buck Clayton, Floyd O'Brien, and other members of Carter's and Fletcher Henderson's bands.

== Discography (cd) ==
- VV AA - The Chocolate Dandies 1928/1940 (EPM 157982, Jazz Archives N° 67, 1993). The most complete anthology contains all the tracks quoted above with the exception of Dedication and the King Oliver session.
- King Oliver - Vocalion & Brunswick Recordings_Farewell Blues (Frog FR, ?)

=== Alternatives ===
- McKinney's Cotton Pickers - The Chronological 1930-31 (Classics #, ?)
- King Oliver - The Chronological 1930-31(Classics #, ?)
- Benny Carter - The Chocolate Dandies 1928-1933 (Parlophone, ?)
- Coleman Hawkins - The Chocolate Dandies And Leonard Feather's Allstars 1940 And 1943 (Commodore, 1985)
