= A Study in Frustration: The Fletcher Henderson Story =

A Study in Frustration

Box set by Fletcher Henderson
- Released: 1961
- Recorded: August 9, 1923, to May 28, 1938
- Genre: Jazz
- Length: 3:09:50
- Label: Columbia
- Producer: Frank Driggs

Professional ratings
Review scores
Source	Rating
AllMusic	5/5 stars

A Study in Frustration: The Fletcher Henderson Story is a box set compilation surveying studio recordings of the Fletcher Henderson Orchestra from 1923 to 1938, released in 1961 on Columbia Records, CXK 85470. It initially appeared as a four-album set produced by Frank Driggs and assembled by John Hammond, both of whom also wrote the liner notes. The set was part of a Thesaurus of Classic Jazz series on Columbia.

== Background ==
After an absence of more than a decade, in the late 1950s John Hammond returned to Columbia Records. He envisioned a reissue project of classic jazz recordings from the 1920s and 1930s who had been mostly forgotten by the record-buying public. Working with producer and record archivist Frank Driggs the project, entitled Thesaurus of Classic Jazz, included anthologies and installments devoted to individual artists. Retrieving copies of old 78 RPM records from various sources, including Driggs' personal collection, the pair assembled 64 selections to represent highlights of Henderson's output spanning 1923 to 1938.

The title of this volume, A Study in Frustration, stems from Henderson and his arrangers, Don Redman and his brother Horace Henderson among them, having invented the basic musical approach and vocabulary of the swing era in the 1920s only to have other bandleaders go on to much greater success using the Henderson formula in the 1930s. For instance, the Henderson orchestra recorded "King Porter Stomp" by Jelly Roll Morton three times to modest success: in 1928, 1932, and 1933, the latter two in arrangements by Henderson. Benny Goodman took this same tune in the Henderson arrangement and recorded it in 1935; the record itself is acknowledged as a catalyst for the swing era, and Goodman playing Henderson arrangements at the Palomar Ballroom on August 21, 1935, is generally looked upon as the launch of the big band craze that would dominate American popular music through World War II.

== Content ==
Included are selections made famous by the Henderson orchestra, including "King Porter Stomp", "Whiteman Stomp", and "Christopher Columbus", and the first recorded composition by Coleman Hawkins, "Queer Notions". Certain selections are credited to the Club Alabam Orchestra, or the Dixie Stompers, among other band pseudonyms. Two notable recordings not included are "Down South Camp Meeting" and "Wrappin' It Up", the latter also proving a hit for the Goodman band.

Other than the Henderson brothers and Redman, arrangers included in the set are Benny Carter, Bill Challis, John Nesbitt; some are heads. Henderson sidemen would go on to success in other bands: Russell Procope, Rex Stewart, Ben Webster, and Cootie Williams with the Duke Ellington Orchestra; trombonists Benny Morton and Dicky Wells with Count Basie; and Roy Eldridge with Gene Krupa. Prominent jazz figures who passed through the orchestra were Red Allen, Louis Armstrong, Buster Bailey, Benny Carter, Coleman Hawkins, Edgar Sampson, Joe Smith, and Fats Waller. Waller allegedly sold several tunes to Henderson in exchange for a dinner of multiple hamburgers, among them "The Stampede", "Henderson Stomp", "Whiteman Stomp", and "St. Louis Shuffle", while the influence of Armstrong during his 1924–25 tenure changed the band's approach to both swing and solo work entirely. Several Henderson sidemen soloists met with an early demise – Charlie Green, Jimmy Harrison, Tommy Ladnier, Kaiser Marshall, and Bobby Stark.

All selections had been previously on 78 records by labels such as Brunswick, Columbia, Paramount, Perfect, and Vocalion. The set documents some of his first recordings as a leader in 1923, to some of his last shortly before he joined the Benny Goodman Orchestra as an arranger and some-time pianist. Like all bandleaders of the time, Henderson recorded with vocalists, but only five songs on this set feature vocals.

A Study in Frustration was reissued on Columbia/Legacy as a three compact disc box set on June 14, 1994, packaged in the longbox format duplicating in full the original liner notes from the 1961 issue. A further reissue appeared in Europe on July 5, 2011, on the Essential Jazz Classics label, with truncated notes but including ten bonus tracks covering recordings in 1934 and 1936 that had not been included in the Columbia set.

== Track listing ==
In the compact disc versions, the song running order is the same with sides one through three comprising disc one, sides four through six comprising disc two, and sides seven and eight along with the bonus tracks comprising disc three. Arrangements by Don Redman except as noted; unknown for bonus tracks.

Side one

No.	Title	Writer(s)	Recording date	Length
1.	"The Dicty Blues"	Fletcher Henderson	August 7, 1923	2:40
2.	"Teapot Dome Blues"	George Lottman, Elmer Schoebel	April 15, 1924	2:58
3.	"Go 'Long Mule"	Henry Creamer, Paul King, Robert King	October 7, 1924	3:07
4.	"Shanghai Shuffle"	Larry Conley, Gene Rodemich	October 19, 1924	3:21
5.	"Copenhagen"	Charlie Davis	October 30, 1924	2:53
6.	"Everybody Loves My Baby"	Jack Palmer, Spencer Williams	November 17, 1924	2:53
7.	"How Come You Do Me Like You Do?"	Gene Austin, Roy Bergere	November 22, 1924	3:13
8.	"Alabamy Bound"	Bud Green, Buddy DeSylva, Ray Henderson	January 31, 1925	3:08

Side two

No.	Title	Writer(s)	Recording date	Length
1.	"Sugarfoot Stomp"	King Oliver	May 29, 1925	2:49
2.	"What-Cha-Call-Em Blues"	Steve Roberts	May 29, 1925	2:51
3.	"T.N.T."	Elmer Schoebel	October 21, 1925	2:55
4.	"The Stampede"	Fletcher Henderson	May 14, 1926	3:17
5.	"Jackass Blues"	Art Kassel, Mel Stitzel	May 14, 1926	3:14
6.	"Henderson Stomp"	Fletcher Henderson	November 3, 1926	2:53
7.	"The Chant"	Mel Stitzel	November 3, 1926	2:58
8.	"Snag It"	King Oliver	January 20, 1927	3:12

Side three

No.	Title	Writer(s)	Recording date	Length
1.	"Rocky Mountain Blues"	Patty Carroll, Ken Macomber, F. Henderson	January 21, 1927	2:46
2.	"Tozo"	M.A. Cowdry, Fletcher Henderson	January 21, 1927	2:56
3.	"St. Louis Shuffle"	Jack Pettis, Fats Waller	March 23, 1927	3:02
4.	"Whiteman Stomp"	Jo Trent, Fats Waller	May 11, 1927	2:47
5.	"I'm Coming Virginia"	Donald Heywood, Will Marion Cook	May 11, 1927	3:07
6.	"Variety Stomp"	Jo Trent, Charlie Green, Fats Waller	May 12, 1927	3:04
7.	"St. Louis Blues"	W. C. Handy	May 12, 1927	3:06
8.	"Goose Pimples" (unidentified stock arrangement)	Jo Trent, Fletcher Henderson	October 24, 1927	3:01

Side four

No.	Title	Writer(s)	Recording date	Length
1.	"Hop Off"	Fats Waller, Spencer Williams	November 4, 1927	2:58
2.	"King Porter Stomp" (head arrangement)	Jelly Roll Morton	March 14, 1928	2:56
3.	"D Natural Blues" (Bill Challis)	Fletcher Henderson	March 14, 1928	3:28
4.	"Oh Baby" (Fletcher Henderson)	O. Murphy, B. DeSylva, W. Donaldson	April 6, 1928	2:49
5.	"Feeling Good" (Fletcher Henderson)	Owen Murphy, Jack Yellen	April 6, 1928	3:29
6.	"I'm Feeling Devilish" (head arrangement)	Maceo Pinkard	April 6, 1928	2:48
7.	"Old Black Joe Blues" (head arrangement)	George Lottman, F. Henderson	November 1928	2:27
8.	"Easy Money" (Benny Carter)	Gene Austin, Benny Carter	December 12, 1928	3:06

Side five

No.	Title	Writer(s)	Recording date	Length
1.	"Come On Baby" (Benny Carter)	Archie Gottler, Sidney Clare, Maceo Pinkard	December 12, 1928	2:57
2.	"Freeze and Melt" (Benny Carter)	Dorothy Fields, Jimmy McHugh	April 1929	3:06
3.	"Raisin' the Roof" (Benny Carter)	Dorothy Fields, Jimmy McHugh	April 1929	2:43
4.	"Blazin'" (Benny Carter)	Joe Sanders	May 16, 1929	3:00
5.	"Wang Wang Blues" (Benny Carter)	Wood, Buster Johnson, Gus Mueller, Busse	May 16, 1929	3:06
6.	"Chinatown, My Chinatown" (John Nesbitt)	William Jerome, Jean Schwartz	October 3, 1930	3:05
7.	"Somebody Loves Me" (Benny Carter)	B. MacDonald, B. DeSylva, G. Gershwin	October 3, 1930	3:06
8.	"Keep a Song in Your Soul" (Benny Carter)	Alexander Hill, Fats Waller	December 2, 1930	3:20

Side six

No.	Title	Writer(s)	Recording date	Length
1.	"Sweet and Hot" (Benny Carter)	Jack Yellen, Harold Arlen	February 5, 1931	3:29
2.	"My Gal Sal" (Bill Challis)	Paul Dresser	February 5, 1931	3:30
3.	"Sugarfoot Stomp" (Fletcher Henderson)	King Oliver	March 19, 1931	3:21
4.	"Clarinet Marmalade" (Bill Challis)	Edwards, LaRocca, Ragas, Sbarbaro, Shields	March 19, 1931	3:15
5.	"Hot and Anxious" (Horace Henderson)	Horace Henderson	March 19, 1931	3:23
6.	"Comin' and Goin'" (Horace Henderson)	Fletcher Henderson, Horace Henderson	March 19, 1931	3:12
7.	"Singin' the Blues" (Fletcher Henderson)	Dorothy Fields, Jimmy McHugh	October 16, 1931	3:08
8.	"Sugar" (Fletcher Henderson)	Joe Young, George W. Meyer	October 16, 1931	2:58

Side seven

No.	Title	Writer(s)	Recording date	Length
1.	"Blue Moments" (Fletcher Henderson)	Fletcher Henderson	March 11, 1932	2:37
2.	"New King Porter Stomp" (Fletcher Henderson)	Jelly Roll Morton	December 9, 1932	3:10
3.	"Underneath the Harlem Moon" (Fletcher Henderson)	Mack Gordon, Harry Revel	December 9, 1932	3:17
4.	"Honeysuckle Rose" (Fletcher Henderson)	Andy Razaf, Fats Waller	December 9, 1932	3:15
5.	"Yeah Man" (Horace Henderson)	Noble Sissle, J. Russel Robinson	August 18, 1933	2:58
6.	"Queer Notions" (Horace Henderson)	Coleman Hawkins	August 18, 1933	2:51
7.	"Can You Take It!" (Fletcher Henderson)	Fletcher Henderson	August 18, 1933	2:52
8.	"King Porter Stomp" (Fletcher Henderson)	Jelly Roll Morton	August 18, 1933	2:59

Side eight

No.	Title	Writer(s)	Recording date	Length
1.	"Christopher Columbus" (Horace Henderson)	Andy Razaf, Chu Berry	March 27, 1936	3:05
2.	"Stealin' Apples" (head arrangement)	Andy Razaf, Fats Waller	March 27, 1936	2:59
3.	"Blue Lou" (Horace Henderson)	Edgar Sampson	March 27, 1936	3:10
4.	"Rhythm of the Tambourine" (Benny Carter)	David Franklin	March 2, 1937	2:41
5.	"Back in Your Own Backyard" (Fletcher Henderson)	Al Jolson, Billy Rose, Dave Dreyer	March 22, 1937	2:35
6.	"Chris and His Gang" (Horace Henderson)	F. Henderson, H. Henderson, J. Dorsey	June 3, 1937	3:03
7.	"Sing You Sinners" (Fletcher Henderson)	Sam Coslow, W. Franke Harling	October 25, 1937	2:45
8.	"Moten Stomp" (Fletcher Henderson)	Bennie Moten, Buster Moten	May 28, 1938	2:44

2011 compact disc reissue bonus tracks

No.	Title	Writer(s)	Recording date	Length
17.	"Wild Party"	Will Hudson	September 25, 1934	3:01
18.	"Rug Cutter's Swing"	Fletcher Henderson	September 25, 1934	2:59
19.	"Hotter Than Hell"	Fletcher Henderson	September 25, 1934	2:50
20.	"Liza (All the Clouds'll Roll Away)"	Gus Kahn, Ira Gershwin, George Gershwin	September 25, 1934	2:36
21.	"I'm a Fool for Loving You"	Sam M. Lewis, Pete Wendling	April 9, 1936	2:37
22.	"Moonrise on the Lowdowns"	A.J. Neiburg, Jerry Livingston	April 9, 1936	2:42
23.	"I'll Always Be in Love with You"	Herman Ruby, Bud Green, Sam Stept	April 9, 1936	3:02
24.	"Jangled Nerves"	Fletcher Henderson, Roger Moore	April 9, 1936	2:35
25.	"Grand Terrace Rhythm"	Fletcher Henderson	May 23, 1936	2:41
26.	"Riffin'"	Horace Henderson	May 23, 1936	2:20

== Personnel ==
- Elmer Chambers, Howard Scott, Rex Stewart – cornet
- Red Allen, Louis Armstrong, Emmett Berry, Elmer Chambers, Roy Eldridge, Leora Henderson, Tommy Ladnier, Mouse Randolph, Howard Scott, Joe Smith, Russell Smith, Bobby Stark, Joe Thomas, Dick Vance – trumpet
- Fernando Arbello, Ed Cuffee, Charlie Green, Jimmy Harrison, J. C. Higginbotham, George Hunt, Keg Johnson, Claude Jones, John McConnell, Benny Morton, Teddy Nixon, Milt Robinson, George Washington, Dicky Wells, Sandy Williams, Al Wynn – trombone
- Jerry Blake – alto clarinet
- Coleman Hawkins – alto saxophone, tenor saxophone, bass saxophone, clarinet
- Don Pasqual – alto saxophone, baritone saxophone
- Don Redman – alto saxophone, clarinet, oboe
- Edgar Sampson – alto saxophone, violin
- Buster Bailey, Hilton Jefferson, Russell Procope, Omer Simeon – alto saxophone, clarinet
- Eddie Barefield, Harvey Boone, Lonnie Brown, Scoops Carry, Benny Carter, Carmelo Jejo, Budd Johnson – alto saxophone
- Chu Berry, Ben Webster, Elmer Williams – tenor saxophone
- June Cole, Ralph Escudero, John Kirby, Del Thomas – tuba
- Fletcher Henderson, Horace Henderson, Fats Waller – piano
- Charlie Dixon, Clarence Holiday – banjo
- Bernard Addison, Bob Lessey, Lawrence Lucie, Freddie White – guitar
- Israel Crosby, Elmer James, John Kirby – bass
- Sid Catlett, Walter Johnson, Kaiser Marshall, Pete Suggs – drums
- Benny Carter, Katherine Handy, Jimmy Harrison, Claude Jones, Les Reis – vocals
