= Jerome Don Pasquall =

American jazz reed player (1902–1971)

- Born: September 20, 1902; Fulton, Kentucky, U.S.
- Origin: St. Louis, Missouri, U.S.
- Died: October 18, 1971 (aged 69); New York City, New York, U.S.
- Genres: Jazz
- Instruments: Clarinet, alto saxophone, mellophone

Jerome Don Pasquall (September 20, 1902 – October 18, 1971) was an American jazz reed player.

== Early life ==
Pasquall was born in Fulton, Kentucky, and grew up in St. Louis. As a child, he played the mellophone in brass bands. He served in the United States Army in 1918 in the 10th Cavalry Band, and picked up clarinet during this time.

== Career ==
Following his discharge, Pasquall played with Ed Allen in 1919 and then found work on riverboats playing with Charlie Creath and Fate Marable. He moved to Chicago to study at the American Conservatory, and played with Doc Cook's Dreamland Orchestra as a tenor saxophonist. He then departed for Boston, and attended the New England Conservatory of Music. In 1927 and 1928, he played with Fletcher Henderson.

Following this he returned to Chicago and led his own ensemble, in addition to playing with Freddie Keppard, Dave Peyton, Jabbo Smith (1931), Tiny Parham, Fess Williams, the 1934 Blackbirds tour of Europe, Eddie South, Henderson again in 1936, and Noble Sissle (1937–1944). After the mid-1940s, he did freelance work in New York, with Tony Ambrose among others, and gradually receded from active performance. He never led his own recording session.
