= Bobby Stark =

American jazz trumpeter and featured soloist

- Born: January 6, 1906; New York, United States
- Origin: United States
- Died: December 29, 1945 (aged 39) New York, United States
- Genres: Jazz
- Occupation: Trumpeter
- Instrument: Trumpet
- Years active: 1920s–1945

Bobby Stark (January 6, 1906 – December 29, 1945) was an American jazz trumpeter.

Stark started playing music at age 15 and played piano, clarinet, saxophone, and alto horn before deciding on trumpet. In the mid-1920s he played with June Clark (1925), Edgar Dowell, Leon Abbey, Duncan Mayers, Bobbie Brown, Bobby Lee, Billy Butler, Charles Turner, McKinney's Cotton Pickers, and Chick Webb, the last in 1926-27.

From 1927 to 1933, he played in Fletcher Henderson's Orchestra as a featured soloist. He returned to duty under Chick Webb behind Taft Jordan from 1934 to 1939. After Webb's death, he remained in the orchestra, now under the direction of Ella Fitzgerald. In 1940, he left the group to freelance. In 1942-43, he served in the Army. Sharp then played with Garvin Bushell (1944) and Benny Morton shortly before his death, in New York, at the age of 39. He never led his own recording session.
