= Prince Robinson =

American jazz musician (1902–1960)

Prince Robinson (June 7, 1902 – July 23, 1960) was an American jazz reed player. He was known for soloing on both tenor saxophone and clarinet in the same recording.

== Early life ==
Robinson was born in Portsmouth, Virginia. He learned to play clarinet as a teenager and moved to New York in 1923, after playing locally in Virginia.

== Career ==
In New York, Robinson quickly found work both performing and recording, with the Blue Rhythm Orchestra, June Clark, Duke Ellington, Billy Fowler, the Gulf Coast Seven, Fletcher Henderson, Lionel Howard, Clara Smith, and Elmer Snowden. He played in Leon Abbey's group on a tour of South America in 1927, and the following year became a member of McKinney's Cotton Pickers.

In the 1930s, Robinson worked with Lil Armstrong, Willie Bryant, Blanche Calloway, Roy Eldridge, and with Teddy Wilson accompanying Billie Holiday. His career continued in the 1940s, including work with Louis Armstrong, Lucky Millinder, and Benny Morton; in 1945, he joined Claude Hopkins's band, remaining with Hopkins until 1952. Later in the 1950s, he worked with Fletcher Henderson again and with Red Allen and Freddie Washington, in addition to leading his own ensemble in 1953.

His last recording was "Mainstream Jazz" by Andy Gibson and his Orchestra in 1959. He played a solo in tenor sax on the theme "Blueprint".

== Death ==
Robinson died in New York City in July 1960.

== Bibliography ==
- Frank Driggs/Barry Kernfeld, "Prince Robinson". The New Grove Dictionary of Jazz. Second edition.
