= Benny Waters =

American jazz saxophonist and clarinetist (1902–1998)

- Born: Benjamin Waters; January 23, 1902; Baltimore, Maryland, U.S.
- Died: August 11, 1998 (aged 96) Columbia, Maryland, U.S.
- Genres: Jazz
- Occupation: Musician
- Instrument: Saxophone

Benjamin Waters (January 23, 1902, Brighton, Baltimore, Maryland – August 11, 1998, Columbia, Maryland) was an American jazz saxophonist and clarinetist. known in part for the longevity of his career.

He began on organ, then switched to clarinet and later added saxophone. The first band he joined in 1918 was Charly Miller's band. In 1922 he attended the New England Conservatory of Music where he gave lessons to Harry Carney.

From 1926 until 1931, he was a member of Charlie Johnson's band. Later he worked with King Oliver, Fletcher Henderson, Claude Hopkins, and others. During these years he made several recordings with King Oliver and Clarence Williams. During 1941–1942 he played with the Jimmie Lunceford Orchestra, and later in the 1940s with Roy Milton. After that he started his own band and played at the Red Mill in New York. After New York he lived for four years in California.

From 1952 to 1992, he lived in Paris, France. In 1996, he received the Legion of Honour from the French Ministry of Culture. He continued to perform regularly up to his 95th birthday. Waters became blind in 1992 due to cataracts.

== Discography ==
=== As leader ===
- Blue Waters (Supraphon, 1976)
- Benny Waters & the Traditional Jazz Studio (I Giganti Del Jazz, 1976)
- When You're Smiling (Hep, 1980)
- On the Sunny Side of the Street (JSP, 1981)
- Hurry on Down (Storyville, 1981)
- Mature Black Beauty (w/Christiania Jazzband) (Hot Club/Jon Larsen, 1983)
- From Paradise (Small's) to Shangri La (Muse, 1987) also released as Hearing is Convincing
- Memories of the Twenties (Stomp Off, 1988)
- Benny Waters Freddy Randall Jazz Band (Jazzology, 1989)
- Swinging Again (Jazz Point, 1993)
- Plays Songs of Love (Jazz Point, 1993)
- Jazz Live (Laserlight, 1997)
- Birdland Birthday Live at 95 (Enja, 1997)
- Great Traditionalists and Quartier Latin Jazz Band (Jazz Point, 1998)
- Live at the Pawnshop (Opus 3, 1999)

=== As sideman ===
- 1978 Roy Milton & His Solid Senders, Roy Milton
- 1980 Harlem Shout, Jimmie Lunceford
- 1991 1926–1928, King Oliver
- 1991 1928–1930, King Oliver
- 1991 1938–1940, Hot Lips Page
- 1992 Groovy Blues, Vol. 2, Roy Milton
- 1993 1937–1940, Claude Hopkins
- 1993 The Collection, Vol. 1: 1927–1928, Clarence Williams
- 1994 Blowin' with Roy, Roy Milton
- 1995 Live at the Riverside, Adelaide Hall
- 1996 Story 1928–1944, Sidney De Paris
- 1996 The Complete Sessions, Charlie Johnson
