= Dippermouth Blues =

Song
- Published: 1923
- Recorded: April 6, 1923
- Genre: Dixieland; jazz; blues
- Label: Gennett 5132
- Composer: King Oliver / Louis Armstrong

Audio sample
- Recording of Dippermouth Blues, performed King Oliver's Creole Jazz Band with Louis Armstrong on cornet, recorded on OKeh 4918. (1923): file; help

"Dippermouth Blues" is a song first recorded by King Oliver's Creole Jazz Band for Gennett Records in April 1923 and for Okeh Records in June of that same year. It is most often attributed to Joe "King" Oliver, though some have argued that Louis Armstrong was in fact the composer. This is partly because "Dippermouth", in the song's title, was a nickname of Armstrong's. Also, the phonograph recordings from 1922 gave credit to Armstrong and Oliver jointly. The song is a strong example of the influence of the blues on early jazz. There is a twelve-bar blues harmonic progression, with frequent bent notes and slides into notes.

Armstrong plays second cornet on the April 6, 1923, recording, with Honoré Dutrey on trombone, Johnny Dodds on clarinet, Lil Hardin on piano, Baby Dodds on drums and Bill Johnson on banjo and vocal. Oliver's plunger mute solo on first cornet became one of the most frequently-imitated solos of his generation. Notably, Oliver pre-composed this solo, playing the same solo on the second recording two weeks later for Okeh.

During Armstrong's tenure in the Fletcher Henderson Orchestra, the song was recorded on May 29, 1925 in a new arrangement by Don Redman under the title Sugarfoot Stomp. Redman selected this tune out of a book of manuscripts shown to Redman by Armstrong; in the arrangement, Armstrong paraphrases Oliver's solo without the plunger effects. After his departure, the Henderson Orchestra recorded the tune again as "Sugarfoot Stomp" on March 19, 1931; both versions can be found on the compilation A Study In Frustration (1961). In 2023, The 1925 version of "Sugarfoot Stomp" by the Fletcher Henderson Orchestra was selected by the Library of Congress for preservation in the United States National Recording Registry as being "culturally, historically, or aesthetically significant."

A piece of the song is used as a plot point in the 2009 Disney film The Princess and the Frog as a work that Prince Naveen plays that allows for him and Tiana to bond with the alligator Louis.

Dr. John covered the song on his 2014 album Ske-Dat-De-Dat: The Spirit of Satch.

The 1923 sound recordings of the song entered the public domain in the United States in 2024.
