= Vance Dixon =

American singer

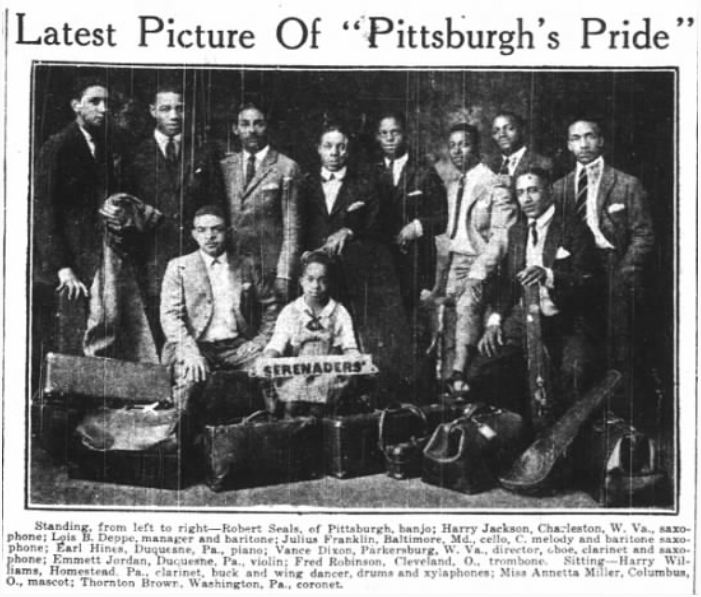
- Dixon in 1923 with the Lois Deppe Serenaders (third from right, standing)

Background information
- Born: Vance Rayman Dixon; 6 August 1901; Parkersburg, West Virginia. United States
- Died: after 27 April 1950
- Genres: Chicago jazz
- Occupations: Musician, bandleader
- Instruments: Vocals, alto saxophone, clarinet
- Labels: Columbia Records, Okeh Records

Vance Dixon (6 August 1901-unknown) was an American musician (alto saxophone, clarinet, vocals) and band leader of Chicago jazz, who was considered a novelty musician.

== Early life ==
Vance Rayman Dixon was born on 6 August 1901 in Parkersburg, West Virginia, the son of Harrison Lewis Dixon and Clara Belle (Lee) Dixon. He was African-American.

== Career ==
Dixon first directed the Symphonium Serenaders in the beginning of the 1920s, who were featured on radio broadcasts in as early as 1922. Later he played in the renamed Lois B. Deppe Serenaders (including Earl Hines), Sammy Stewart, Clarence M. Jones (1928), Erskine Tate (1930) and Kline Tyndall's Paramount Serenaders. In this period, Don Redman, when he was a member of the Fletcher Henderson Orchestra, tried to recruit Vance for the band but he told Redman that he didn't want to leave Virginia.

Under his own name, first in a duo with Tyndall or Alex Channey, then with his trio Jazz Maniacs (Kline Tyndall, Lawrence Dixon) – he recorded several titles for Paramount in 1926. In 1929 he followed it up by recording with Hattie McDaniels and Frankie Jaxon as Vance Dixon and His Pencils.

In 1931 he recorded several titles for Columbia/Okeh in New York, including the humorous numbers "Laughing Stomp" and "Meat Man Pete (Pete, The Dealer In Meat)"). Dixon was involved in twelve recording sessions from 1923 to 1932. As of 1933, he played with the house band of the Brooklyn Club Casa Mia, who also included the banjoist Ikey Robinson as a member. Before Dixon disappeared from the music scene, he worked for June Clark in 1936 and as a cabaret musician in 1940 in New York according to the census for that year, when he lived in Brookhaven on Long Island.

== Personal life ==
Dixon first married Catherine Cuddy from Rome, Italy on 25 Apr 1925 in Columbus, Ohio. She was the daughter of James Cuddy and Rachel Odis. They divorced in Chicago, Illinois before 13 May 1930.

Dixon later married to Virginia Smith of Sewickley, Pennsylvania on 6 October 1930 in Chicago, Illinois. She deserted him a month later.

In April 1950, Dixon was out of work, living in Manhattan in New York City.
