= Solomon Hicks =

American singer-songwriter (born 1995)

- Born: February 8, 1995 (age 31); Harlem, New York City, U.S.
- Genres: Blues, Jazz
- Occupations: Musician, Singer
- Instrument: Guitar
- Years active: 2010–present
- Label: Provogue Records
- Website: kingsolomonhicks.com

"King" Solomon Hicks (born February 8, 1995) is an American guitarist, blues, jazz singer, and composer. His style of music ranges from jazz, blues, classical, gospel, R&B, funk, Afro-Cuban, and classic rock. Hicks has been a blues guitarist since he was 13. He plays a Benedetto GA35 guitar. Benedetto jazz guitars are hand crafted by Robert Benedetto an American luthier of archtop jazz guitars. He teaches beginning and advanced guitar along with music theory.

His first recording was when he was 14 with the Cotton Club All-Star Band. The CD is called Embryonic. He has toured in Spain, Denmark, the Netherlands, Germany, Mexico, Japan, the Bahamas, Bermuda, Barbados, and the United States.

== Early life ==
Hicks received his first guitar lessons at the age six. His mother Holly Hicks was his first tutor. She taught him the history of African-American music. He started learning soul music, blues, and then Jimi Hendrix. He was playing music before he learned to read music. He attended the Harlem School of Arts and the [Jazzmobile] training program. His parents took him to jam sessions where he got to sit in and to clubs in Harlem such as the Lenox Lounge and St. Nick's Pub. At an early age Hicks sat in on jam sessions with Charles Earland, and Jimmy McGriff. At the age of 13 he started playing with the Cotton Club in New York City's 17-piece band as a lead guitarist. At Harlem's School of the Arts and at Harbor Conservatory for the Performing Arts he studied jazz, classical, and Afro-Cuban guitar. He attended [Jazzmobile] workshops where he studied bebop with Barry Harris. Hicks says that his first mentor was Melvin Sparks. At an early age he started performing at the New Amsterdam Musical Association in Harlem and at Amateur Night at the Apollo Theater, and performed three Christmas show specials. He also appeared at B.B. Kings Club for five years, Minton's Playhouse (four years), Ashford and Simpson's 'Sugar Bar' (four years) plus Red Rooster & Ginny's in Harlem (seven years) and at Terra Blues (eight years). He graduated from Talent Unlimited High School as a music major in 2012.

== Career ==
In 2010, Hicks performed during the New York Knicks game. He has performed at the United Nations in New York City. He has performed for former Mayor of New York City, Michael Bloomberg, as well as performing for former Governor of New York David Paterson and former Congressman Charlie Rangel.

Hicks has performed at the KISS Kruise V, the Joe Bonamassa Blues Cruise in 2017, the Festival De Blues De Bejar-Blues Cazorla-San Javier in Spain, in France at the Jazz Marciac, and the Cotton Club in Tokyo. He has performed at music festivals in Spain, Germany, France, the Netherlands, Tokyo, Japan, Denmark, Coppenhagen, Curacao, Jamaica, Mexico, the Bahamas, Bermuda, Barbados, and United States.

He has performed with Tony Bennett, Jon Hendricks, Antoinette Montague, Jay Hoggard, Alvester Garnett, Mike Stern, Lee Ritenour, Bruce Springsteen, Neal Evans Soulive, George Thorogood, The Marcus King Band, Jimmy Vivino, Danny Mixon, Sam Moore, William Bell, Jerron "Blind Boy" Paxton, John Németh, Roger Earl, Ne-Yo, Davy Knowles, Kim Simmonds, Savoy Brown, Gregg Allman, Eric Gales, Russell Malone, B.B. King, Kermit Ruffins, Lonnie Youngblood, Southside Johnny, Elvin Bishop, Belden Bullock, T. K. Blue, Danny Mixon, Samantha Fish and Winard Harper.

Hicks has taught music at the Children's Aid Society in New York City. Hicks is a member of the Harlem Arts Alliance. He supports Jazzmobile and is a member of the Blues Foundation in Memphis, Tennessee.

Hicks opened for Ringo Starr and Jeff Beck at the Holland International Blues Festival in June 2018 in Blues Village Grolloo, the Netherlands. In 2018 he toured with Beth Hart, performing in Las Vegas and New Orleans.

== Awards and honors ==
- 2008 – Jazz Excellence Award and scholarship, Friendly 50 Club organization
- 2009–2010 – AUDELCO Rising Star honoree
- 2012 – Named one of the Innovators of Change by J. Walter Thompson's Differenter Committee. He was one of the subjects for the film documentary about New York's accomplished and creative African-American citizens.
- 2017 – Hot House magazine award for Rising Star
- 2021 – Blues Music Award for Best Emerging Artist Album, Harlem

== Discography ==
- Embryonic (Cotton Club, 2010)
- Carrying On the Torch of the Blues (2016)
- Alive and Electrified at the Iridium, New York City (2018)
- Harlem, Provogue Records (2020)
