= Sing, Sing, Sing (with a Swing) =

1930s jazz standard

- Original Brunswick 78 rpm record (1936)

Song by Louis Prima
- Released: February 28, 1936
- Genre: Jazz; swing; big band
- Label: Brunswick 7628
- Songwriter: Louis Prima

"Sing, Sing, Sing (with a Swing)" is a 1936 song, with music and lyrics by Louis Prima, who first recorded it with his New Orleans Gang. Brunswick Records released it on February 28, 1936 on the 78 rpm record format, with "It's Been So Long" as the B-side. The song is strongly identified with the big band and swing eras. Several have performed the piece as a vocal cover, including The Andrews Sisters, or as an instrumental, including Fletcher Henderson, Gene Krupa (with the first extended drum solos to be recorded commercially) and, most famously, Benny Goodman.

== Benny Goodman recording ==
On July 6, 1937, "Sing, Sing, Sing" was recorded in Hollywood with Benny Goodman on clarinet; Gene Krupa on drums; Harry James, Ziggy Elman, and Chris Griffin on trumpets; Red Ballard and Murray McEachern on trombones; Hymie Schertzer and George Koenig on alto saxophones; Art Rollini and Vido Musso on tenor saxophone; Jess Stacy on piano; Allan Reuss on guitar; and Harry Goodman on bass. The song was arranged by Jimmy Mundy.

Unlike most big band arrangements of that era, limited in length to three minutes so that they could be recorded on one side of a standard 10-inch 78 rpm record, the version which Goodman's band recorded was an extended work. The 1937 recording lasted 8 minutes and 43 seconds, and it took up both sides of a 12-inch record. The recording of Goodman's 1938 Carnegie Hall live performance (with impromptu solos) took 12 minutes and 30 seconds. Mundy's arrangement incorporated "Christopher Columbus", a piece written by Chu Berry for the Fletcher Henderson band, as well as Prima's work. Fletcher Henderson recorded a vocal version in August 1936. The 1937 Benny Goodman recording was inducted into the Grammy Hall of Fame in 1982.

=== Reception ===
Ross Firestone says that the 1937 recording "bore only the slightest resemblance to the original score". Helen Ward said that the changes started spontaneously: "One night Gene just refused to stop drumming when he got to the end of the third chorus, where the tune was supposed to end, so Benny blithely picked up the clarinet and noodled along with him. Then someone else stood up and took it, and it went on from there." Firestone says that the elements from "Christopher Columbus" were added this way. The title of the number as given on the Goodman recordings acknowledges the additional tune – "Sing, Sing, Sing (introducing Christopher Columbus)".

Music critics Nat Shapiro and Nat Hentoff quote Goodman as saying: "'Sing, Sing, Sing' (which we started doing back at the Palomar on our second trip there in 1936) was still a big thing, and no one-nighter was complete without it." Goodman's 1938 Carnegie Hall jazz concert performance with the "Christopher Columbus" interpolation was different from the commercial release and subsequent performances with the Goodman band. The personnel of the Goodman band for the Carnegie Hall concert were the same as in the 1937 recording session, except that Vernon Brown replaced Murray McEachern on trombone, and Babe Russin replaced Vido Musso on tenor saxophone.

Stacy was quoted as saying that he was glad he did not know that Goodman was going to let him solo, because then he would have gotten nervous and "screwed it up".

== See also ==
- List of 1930s jazz standards
- The Famous 1938 Carnegie Hall Jazz Concert

== Bibliography ==
- Balliett, Whitney (2005). American Musicians II: Seventy-One Portraits in Jazz (2nd ed.). Jackson, MI: Univ. Press of Mississippi. ISBN 0-19-509538-3 – via Google Books.
- Firestone, Ross (1993). Sing, Sing, Sing The Life & Times of Benny Goodman. New York; London: W. W. Norton & Company. ISBN 978-0340430415.
- Shapiro, Nat; Hentoff, Nat, eds. (1966) [1955]. Hear Me Talkin' to Ya: The Story of Jazz As Told by the Men Who Made It. New York: Dover Publications. ISBN 0-486-21726-4. LCCN 66-28271 – via Google Books).
