= Cora LaRedd =

American singer and dancer

Cora LaRedd was an American singer and dancer during the 1920s and 1930s. She had a driven, hard-hitting, and athletic tap dance style that showcased her rhythmic abilities. Her performance in the short film That's the Spirit survives.

== Biography ==
LaRedd was a popular night time performer at the Cotton Club. She worked as both a singer and a tap dancer. LaRedd's open sexuality influenced her unique performance style. In the late 1920s and into 1930 she also performed in Broadway theatre. During this time, she became the lead dancer for Charlie Dixon of the Fletcher Henderson Band. In 1933, LaRedd appeared in a 12-minute short titled, "That's the Spirit".

== Personal life and culture ==
LaRedd was born August 4, 1910 in Jacksonville, Florida. She was raised on Broome Street, in Lower Manhattan. At a young age, she began performing in the Cotton Club, located in Harlem. During the 1920s the Harlem Renaissance occurred. The Harlem Renaissance was an eruption of artistic, social, and intellectual life, often referred to as the golden age of African American Culture in Central Manhattan. LaRedd performed during this time. LaRedd died on March 21, 1968.

== Broadway ==
LaRedd first appeared on Broadway in the 1929 performance of Say When. She then performed as a member in the ensemble for the 1929 performance of "Messin' Around." In the 1930 performance of "Change Your Luck,” LaRedd played the role of Bandana Babe Peppers.

== Cotton Club ==
LaRedd was a popular night time performer at the Cotton Club, located in the Theatre District of New York. The Cotton Club did not allow African American patrons, but it featured a number of African American performers; LaRedd was one featured performer during the time of the Harlem Renaissance. LaRedd performed both as a singer and as an athletic, and rhythmic tap dancer. Cora LaRedd's open sexuality influenced her unique performance style. In the fall of 1930 LaRedd performed in “Brown Sugar – Sweet but Unrefined”. The Depression and the repeal of Prohibition caused The Cotton Club to close in 1936.

== Film ==
In 1933, LaRedd appeared in a 12 minute, black and white short, titled That’s the Spirit. The All African American short featured LaRedd singing and dancing to a song titled '“Jig Time”. LaRedd's performance consisted of a short vocal song, followed by an aerobic tap dance. She was accompanied by a big brass band.
