= Ed Cuffee =

American jazz musician

- Birth name: Edward Emerson Cuffee
- Born: June 7, 1902; Norfolk, Virginia, U.S.
- Died: January 3, 1959 (aged 57); New York City, New York, U.S.
- Genres: Jazz
- Instruments: Trombone

Edward Emerson Cuffee (June 7, 1902 – January 3, 1959) was an American jazz trombonist.

== Career ==
Cuffee moved to New York in the 1920s, where he recorded with Clarence Williams (1927–29) and played with Bingie Madison. He played in McKinney's Cotton Pickers (1929–34) and in Fletcher Henderson's band (1935–38), then with Leon Abbey (1940 and subsequently), Count Basie (1941), Chris Columbus (1944), and Bunk Johnson (1947). Cuffee quit playing professionally after the late 1940s. Cuffee has sometimes been incorrectly referred to as Cuffee Davidson because of erroneous early sources.
