= Mary Stafford =

Mary Stafford may refer to:

- Mary Stafford (singer) (c. 1895–c. 1938), American cabaret singer
- Mary Stafford Anthony (1827–1907), American suffragist
- Mary Boleyn Stafford (c. 1499–1543), sister of Queen Anne Boleyn and a mistress of Henry VIII
- Mary Howard, Countess of Stafford (1619–1693), née Stafford, English suo jure peeress
