= Charlie Dixon (musician) =

American jazz banjoist

Charles Edward Dixon (December 31, 1898 in Jersey City, New Jersey – December 6, 1940 in New York City) was an American jazz banjoist.

Between 1921 and 1923, Dixon was a member of Johnny Dunn's Original Jazz Hounds, one of several Dunn-led line-ups that recorded in New York around that time for the Columbia label. Dixon played in local ensembles in Boston and New York before becoming a member of Sam Wooding's orchestra in 1922. Wooding had been in Dunn's band at the same time. In 1923, he joined up with Fletcher Henderson, playing and writing arrangements for him until 1928 and continuing to write charts for Henderson after his departure. He played with Henderson in both small and big band formats, and recorded in Henderson's pseudonymous groups such as the Dixie Stompers. Among the musicians he played with while under Wooding and Henderson were Kaiser Marshall, Louis Armstrong, Ralph Escudero, Coleman Hawkins, Don Redman, and Elmer Chambers. He also played in small ensembles accompanying singers such as Bessie Smith, Ma Rainey, Trixie Smith, and Alberta Hunter in the 1920s.

In the 1930s, he led a band which accompanied dancer Cora LaRedd, and also arranged and composed for Chick Webb, including Dixon's arrangements for the latter of "That Naughty Waltz" and "Harlem Congo". Unlike most of the banjoists of his era, he never switched to guitar, and his banjo work is often difficult to hear on record.

== Other sources ==
- Charlie Dixon at AllMusic
- Leonard Feather and Ira Gitler, The Biographical Encyclopedia of Jazz. Oxford, 1999, p. 184.
- All About Jazz Forum
