= Christopher Columbus (jazz song) =

1936 American jazz song

"Christopher Columbus" is an American jazz song composed by Chu Berry with lyrics by Andy Razaf. Pianist Fats Waller turned the tune into a 1936 novelty hit, which was subsequently recorded by numerous other artists and became a jazz standard. Jimmy Mundy wrote the lead into a medley with "Sing, Sing, Sing" for Benny Goodman.

== Cover versions ==
- Van Alexander
- Henry "Red" Allen
- Harry Allen
- Woody Allen
- Gene Ammons
- Ernestine Anderson
- Ray Anthony
- Jimmy Archey
- Louis Armstrong
- Asva
- Chris Barber
- Len Barry
- Dan Barrett
- Sidney Bechet
- Thilo Berg
- Chu Berry
- Wild Bill Davison
- Acker Bilk
- Sandy Brown
- Dave Brubeck
- Darius Brubeck
- Chris Brubeck
- Papa Bue Jensen
- Judy Carmichael
- Ralph Carney
- Benny Carter
- Buck Clayton
- Buddy Cole
- Paolo Conte
- Hollie Cook
- Bob Crosby
- James Dapogny
- Brian Dee
- Vic Dickenson
- Tommy Dorsey/Lionel Hampton
- Tommy Dorsey
- The Easy Riders
- Roy Eldridge
- Les Elgart
- Duke Ellington
- Prince Fatty
- Buddy Featherstonhaugh
- Ernie Fields
- Pete Fountain
- Winston Francis
- Jim Galloway
- Gene Gifford
- Dizzy Gillespie
- Benny Goodman
- Marty Grosz
- Bobby Hackett
- Allan Hartwell/Cozy Cole
- Joe Haymes
- Fletcher Henderson/Johannes Heesters
- Gwen Howard
- The Ink Spots
- Oliver Jackson
- The Juggernauts
- Klaus Kinski
- Andy Kirk
- Gene Krupa
- Gene Krupa / Benny Goodman
- Jim Kweskin
- Willie Lewis
- Humphrey Lyttelton
- Machito
- Barbara Mason
- Billy May
- Jack McDuff
- Mezz Mezzrow
- Lucky Millinder
- Bob Mintzer
- Barbara Morrison
- Danny Moss
- Tony Muréna
- Natty
- Albert Nicholas
- Kid Ory
- Dave Pell
- King Perry
- Don Redman
- Harry Reser
- Little Roy
- Randy Sandke
- Antti Sarpila
- Artie Shaw
- Charlie Shavers
- Len Skeat
- Teddy Stauffer
- Maxine Sullivan
- Ralph Sutton
- Jack Teagarden
- Teo
- Bruce Turner
- Larry Verne
- Fats Waller
- Dinah Washington
- Lawrence Welk
- Teddy Wilson
- Mary Lou Williams
- Teddy Wilson
- Xit
