= Russell Smith (trumpeter) =

American jazz musician

- Birth name: Russell Taylor Smith
- Born: February 5, 1890; Ripley, Ohio, U.S.
- Died: March 27, 1966 (aged 76); Los Angeles, California, U.S.
- Genres: Jazz
- Instruments: Trumpet

Russell Taylor "Pops" Smith (February 5, 1890 – March 27, 1966) was an American jazz trumpeter.

== Early life ==
Smith was born in Ripley, Ohio. Smith learned alto horn as a child, and switched to trumpet when he was fourteen years old. He played in local bands as a teenager and relocated to New York City in 1910.

== Career ==
By 1915, Smith was playing in London with Joe Jordan's orchestra. In the late 1910s and early 1920s he found work playing stage revues and in military bands. He became a member of Fletcher Henderson's band in 1925, remaining with Henderson intermittently until 1941. During that time, he also played in the Blackbirds of 1928 revue and, in the mid-1930s, with Horace Henderson, Benny Carter, and Claude Hopkins. From 1941 to 1946, he played in Cab Calloway's group, then worked with Noble Sissle toward the end of the 1940s. He moved to California in the 1950s, where he lived the rest of his life. He was less active as a performer, but occasionally taught music.

== Personal life ==
Smith was the brother of Joe Smith. He died in March 1966 in Los Angeles, California, at the age of 76.

== Other sources ==
- "Russell Smith". The New Grove Dictionary of Jazz. 2nd edition, ed. Barry Kernfeld.
