= Old Yazoo =

Song by The Boswell Sisters
- Released: August 8, 1932
- Genre: Jazz, Holiday
- Length: 3:06
- Songwriter: Fats Waller

Old Yazoo is a 1932 song written by Fats Waller and released by the Boswell Sisters.

== Composition ==
The song highlights characteristic features of Boswell arrangements: tempo changes, choruses in minor keys, and subtle changes of chord structure and melodic lines. Other than that, this song simply uses the same instruments that the Boswell Sisters use in other songs.

== Versions ==
There have been 15 versions of Old Yazoo, 7 out of the 15 were either released in 1932 or 2008.

== 1932 versions ==
- Cab Calloway and his Orchestra (October)
- Waring's Pennsylvanians - Vocal Refrain by Frank Zullo and Chorus
- The Boswell Sisters
- Baron Lee and his Blue Rhythm Boys - Vocal by Billy Banks

== 2008 versions ==
- The Pfister Sisters (April 23)
- Fred Sokolow (October)
- The Hunger Mountain Boys

== Other versions ==
- Washboard Rhythm Kings - Vocal Chorus by Steve Washington (1933)
- W. Lee O'Daniel and His Hillbilly Boys (May 1939)
- Swing Sisters & The Pasadena Roof Orchestra (1994)
- Guy's All-Star Shoe Band with Guest Garrison Keillor (1996)
- Tom Baker & Bob Barnard (1997)
- Hal Smith's Rhythmakers featuring Rebecca Kilgore (August 10, 1999)
- Royal Society Jazz Orchestra (2002)
- Neville Dickie (2003)

== Video game ==
The song increased in popularity from TikTok and YouTube via the song being used in the 2024 Steam game Bad Parenting.
