= Dave Wilborn =

American jazz musician

David Buckley Wilborn (April 11, 1904 – April 25, 1982) was an American jazz singer and banjoist, best known for his time as a member of McKinney's Cotton Pickers.

== Early life ==
Wilborn was born in Springfield, Ohio, on April 11, 1904. He started on piano at the age of 12 but switched to banjo soon after.

== Later life and career ==
Wilborn played with Cecil and Lloyd Scott in 1922, then joined Bill McKinney's Synco Septet, which became the Cotton Pickers soon after. He sang and played banjo for the group until its dissolution in 1934, and when it reformed a short time later he remained in the group until 1937. In 1928, he also recorded with Louis Armstrong.

After 1937, Wilborn worked as a bandleader until 1950, after which he left full-time performance. When David Hutson formed the New McKinney's Cotton Pickers, Wilborn (who may have been the last living member of the original band) also played in this ensemble. He sang and played on their albums New McKinney's Cotton Pickers (1972) and You're Driving Me Crazy (1973). He died during a performance in Detroit on April 25, 1982.
