= Elmer Williams (saxophonist) =

American jazz saxophonist (1905–1962)

- Born: 1905; Red Banks, New Jersey, U.S.
- Died: June 1962 (aged 56–57)
- Genres: Jazz
- Instruments: Tenor saxophone

Elmer "Tone" Williams (1905 – June 1962) was an American jazz tenor saxophonist,

Elmer Williams was one of the early tenor sax players with personality and good qualities, known primarily for his works with Chick Webb, .

Williams worked with Claude Hopkins (1926-1927), then he joined Webb's Orchestra in 1927. Along with this band, Williams appeared on Louis Armstrong's 1932 The Complete RCA Victor Recordings.

Elmer worked mainly with Chick Webb until 1934 (briefly with McKinney's Cotton Pickers in summer of 1931). After a little break, he continues to work with Webb until 1936.

From 1936 until 1939 he worked regularly with Fletcher Henderson, then joined Horace Henderson in June 1939.

In 1941 he was with Ella Fitzgerald, subsequently with Lucky Millinder (1944–45) and Claude Hopkins again (1946).

He can be seen playing with Noble Sissle's Orchestra in the film short “Bob Howard’s House Party” (1947). This scene was reused in the Race Film “Murder With Music” (1948).

Elmer Williams toured with Herbert ‘Kat’ Cowens in summer of 1950, later in the 1950s worked in Milan, Italy, with tenorist Freddy Mitchell’s band.

In later life he suffered from diabetes; eventually he had both legs amputated, but continued to play ‘gigs’ in a wheelchair.
