= Whiteman Stomp =

- by Paul Whiteman, Fats Waller, and Jo Trent
- 1927 78 release by Fletcher Henderson and his Orchestra as Columbia 1059-D
- Year: 1927
- Genre: Jazz

"Whiteman Stomp" is a 1927 jazz composition by musician and bandleader Paul Whiteman, Fats Waller, and Jo Trent. The song was released as a 78 single by both Paul Whiteman and Fletcher Henderson.

== Background ==
In Louis Armstrong and Paul Whiteman: Two Kings of Jazz (2004), Joshua Berrett noted that "Whiteman Stomp" was credited to Fats Waller, Alphonso Trent, and Paul Whiteman. The reference is to lyricist Jo Trent as the co-author. The Fletcher Henderson Orchestra first recorded "Whiteman Stomp" on 11 May 1927 and released it as Columbia 78 single, 1059-D. The Fletcher Henderson recording lists the songwriters as "Fats Waller/Jo Trent/Paul Whiteman" as "Whiteman, Waller and Trent". Paul Whiteman recorded the song on 11 August 1927 and released it as a Victor 78 single, 21119-A. The music incorporates the themes, motifs, and style of Paul Whiteman.

The Fletcher Henderson recording was also released in France in 1946 as Columbia DF 3081 as a 10" 78 RPM shellac as part of the Anthologie Du Hot Club De France series which listed the composers as "Whiteman - Waller & Trent".

== Other recordings ==
"Whiteman Stomp" was also recorded by Lud Gluskin and Son on Pathe and by the Orchestra of Indian Hill.

== Sources ==
- Paul Whiteman: Pioneer of American Music (Volume 1: 1890–1930), Studies in Jazz, No. 43, by Don Rayno, The Scarecrow Press, Inc., 2003
- Pops: Paul Whiteman, King of Jazz, by Thomas A. DeLong, New Century Publishers, 1983
- Jazz by Paul Whiteman, J. H. Sears, 1926
- How To Be A Band Leader by Paul Whiteman and Leslie Lieber, Robert McBride & Company, 1948
- American Popular Song: The Great Innovators 1900–1950 by Alec Wilder, New York & Oxford: Oxford University Press, 1990. ISBN 0-19-501445-6
