= Spirits of Rhythm =

American jazz vocal & string band

Spirits of Rhythm were an American jazz string band.

The ensemble's members had previously played under several other names (The Sepia Nephews, Ben Bernie's Nephews, The Five Cousins), and upon adding Teddy Bunn as guitarist in 1932, the group began calling itself Spirits of Rhythm. They occasionally recorded, and performed frequently on 52nd Street in New York City, as well as in Hollywood films in the 1930s and early 1940s.

The group featured vocalists accompanied by string instruments, sometimes with other accompaniment such as homemade percussion instruments and harmonica. In addition to guitar and bass, the Spirits of Rhythm featured ukulele-family instruments, including more than one Martin-style tiple, a 10-string tenor uke with multiple strings on each course. The group vocals included scat. With some personnel changes and name changes reflecting the number of members, the group kept performing until 1946.

As the Four Spirits of Rhythm, the group appeared in the films Sweetheart of the Campus (1941), Alabamy Bound (1941) and Yes, Indeed! (1941).

As the Six Spirits of Rhythm, they appeared with George M Cohan in Gambling (1934).

== Members ==
- Douglas Daniels - tiple
- Walter Daniels - tiple
- Teddy Bunn - guitar
- Wellman Braud - bass
- Wilson Myers - bass
- Leo Watson - vocals, tiple
- Virgil Scoggins - percussion
- Red McKenzie - percussion
