= Cyrus St. Clair =

American jazz musician

- Born: 1890; Cambridge, Maryland, U.S.
- Died: 1955 (aged 64–65); New York City, New York, U.S.
- Genres: Jazz
- Instruments: Tuba, double bass

Cyrus St. Clair (1890 – 1955) was an American jazz tubist and double-bassist.

== Early life ==
St. Clair was born in Cambridge, Maryland; both his father and uncle were tubists. He played locally as a cornetist before switching to tuba.

== Career ==
St. Clair relocated to New York City in 1925 and played with Wilbur De Paris, Charlie Johnson, Clarence Williams, and Bessie Smith in the second half of the 1920s. He worked briefly in 1930 with Cozy Cole before rejoining Williams, with whom he recorded copiously until 1937. He also played with Leroy Tibbs and King Oliver. St. Clair then left music for a period, though in 1947 he returned to performing, working as a double-bassist with Tony Parenti and Knocky Parker and performing on Rudi Blesh's radio program This Is Jazz. He died in New York City in 1955.
