= Royal Garden Blues =

Song by Spencer Williams and Clarence Williams

Song by Original Dixieland Jazz Band
- A-side: "Dangerous Blues"
- Published: 1919 by Shapiro, Bernstein & Co.
- Released: November 1921
- Recorded: May 25, 1921
- Genre: Blues
- Label: Victor
- Songwriters: Clarence Williams and Spencer Williams

Audio sample
- Mary Stafford's performance of "Royal Garden Blues" in 1921.: file; help

"Royal Garden Blues" is a blues song composed by Clarence Williams and Spencer Williams in 1919. Popularized in jazz by the Original Dixieland Jazz Band, it has since been recorded by numerous artists and has become a jazz standard. The song is considered one of the first popular songs based on a riff.

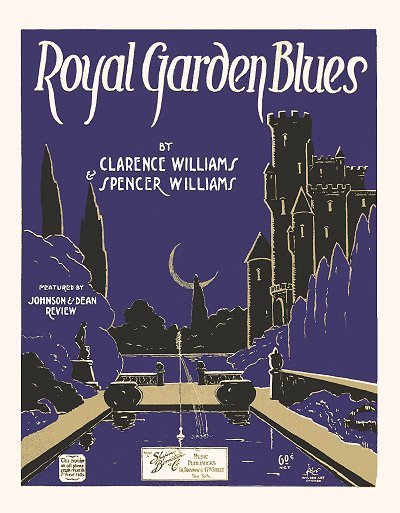
"Royal Garden Blues" sheet music cover.

Clarence Williams and Spencer Williams (no relation) collaborated on two other songs as well: "I Ain’t Gonna Give Nobody None o’ This Jelly Roll" and "Yama Yama Blues." It is speculated that Spencer was the actual composer of the tunes, and that Clarence was given shared credit for publishing the song.

== See also ==
- List of pre-1920 jazz standards
