= Teddy Bunn =

American jazz guitarist (1910–1978)

Background information
- Born: Theodore Leroy Bunn; May 7, 1910; Freeport, New York, U.S.
- Died: July 20, 1978 (aged 69) Lancaster, California
- Genres: Jazz, swing
- Occupations: Musician, singer
- Instruments: Guitar, vocals
- Years active: 1929–1960s
- Formerly of: Spirits of Rhythm

Theodore Leroy Bunn (May 7, 1910 (Note: The previous version of this entry showed Bunn's birth year as 1909, with the note "Some sources give 1910, based on a social security application.") – July 20, 1978) was an American jazz and blues guitarist who was a member of the Spirits of Rhythm during the 1930s.

== Early life ==
Bunn, who was of African American heritage, was born in Freeport, New York. He had two brothers, Kenneth and Jimmy. Bunn's father played accordion and harmonica; his mother played organ in a church. Bunn was given a guitar by his father, who also gave him some basic instruction; apart from this, Bunn was self-taught. He never learned to read music, so he played by ear.

== Career ==
Bunn was considered one of the best acoustic guitarists of the 1930s. He appeared on record for the first time in 1929 as a member of a trio with trumpeter Red Allen and pianist Fats Pichon, then as a guest with the Duke Ellington Orchestra. Soon after, he recorded with the Six Jolly Jesters in the first of many washboard-and-kazoo sessions during his career with bands such as The Washboard Rhythm Kings and the Washboard Serenaders. During the following year, he participated in a rare session with Jelly Roll Morton and clarinetist Wilton Crawley. He also accompanied vocalists Victoria Spivey, Lizzie Miles, and Spencer Williams. For the rest of the decade, he recorded with the swing band Spirits of Rhythm led by vocalist Leo Watson.

Bunn recorded with such musicians as Sidney Bechet, Hadda Brooks, Johnny Dodds, J. C. Higginbotham, Lionel Hampton, and Jimmie Noone. He played electric guitar from 1940. He recorded solo numbers for Blue Note in 1940; after this, his popularity declined.

By the 1970s, Bunn played electric guitar almost exclusively in R&B bands. He suffered a stroke after joining Louis Jordan's band, and was sick for more than a decade. He died on July 20, 1978, in Lancaster, California.

== Playing style ==
Bunn's playing was "predominantly melodic rather than chordal". He did not use a pick; he used "mostly my thumb, that's how I figured it when I first had that first guitar."
