= That's the Spirit (1933 film) =

Short musical by Roy Mack

- Directed by: Roy Mack
- Starring: Jack Carter; Cora LaRedd; Buster Bailey; Mantan Moreland; Flournoy Miller
- Cinematography: Edwin B. DuPar
- Production company: Vitaphone
- Distributed by: Warner Bros.
- Release date: April 15, 1933
- Running time: 11 minutes
- Country: United States
- Language: English

That's the Spirit is an American short musical film released in 1933. It features an African American cast starring Noble Sissle and was directed by Roy Mack. The Vitaphone film was distributed by Warner Brothers. The film survives.

That's the Spirit includes Noble Sissle Orchestra performing "Tiger Rag", Jack Carter singing "Saint Louis Blues" and Washboard Stompers performing "Stomp".

It has been described as "one of the greatest all-black jazz shorts ever made."

That's the Spirit includes various special effect gags repeated to ghostly apparitions. It is believed to be Mantan Moreland's first film.

That's the Spirit was included in a jazz program at Festival of the Arts at Wilmington College in 1968.

== Plot ==
Mantan Moreland and Flournoy Miller star as two watchmen who hear singing from a haunted pawn shop. A miniature jazz band comes to life in the film led by Noble Sissle, featuring clarinetist Buster Bailey, and Cora LaRedd sings and dances to "Jig Time".

== Cast ==
- Noble Sissle as Band Leader
- Mantan Moreland as Night Watchman
- Flournoy Miller as Night Watchman
- Buster Bailey as Clarinet Player
- Cora LaRedd as Singer

== Reception ==
Variety's review was largely critical of the film. “Noble Sissle and his band of colored musicians are no appealing sights on the screen to general theatre audiences. Where the shadowy effects are used, okay. Therefore, no particularly keen screen fare is this short".
