= Ed Allen (musician) =

American jazz trumpeter and cornetist (1897–1974)

- Born: Edward Clifton Allen; December 15, 1897; Nashville, Tennessee
- Died: January 28, 1974 (aged 76) New York City, New York
- Genres: Jazz
- Instruments: Trumpet, cornet

Edward Clifton Allen (December 15, 1897 – January 28, 1974) was an American jazz trumpeter and cornetist.

== Early life ==
Allen was born in Nashville, Tennessee on December 15, 1897. His family moved to St. Louis, Missouri when he was seven; he began playing piano at age ten and settled on cornet soon after. He worked as a truck driver in his teens and played in military bands.

== Later life and career ==
By the mid-1910s Allen was playing professionally in local nightclubs and bars. He moved to Seattle to take a gig with Ralph Stevenson, then returned to St. Louis to play on the Streckfus line of riverboats which ran between New Orleans and St. Louis on the Mississippi River. Early in the 1920s he played in the band of Charlie Creath, but by 1922 he had his own ensemble, the Whispering Gold Band, aboard the S.S. Capitol. After this, he was based in New Orleans until 1923.

In 1924 he made his way to Chicago and played with Earl Hines until 1925. He then played from 1925 to 1927 in a revue called Ed Daily's Black and White Show, as a member of Joe Jordan's group, the Sharps & Flats. Between 1927 and 1937 Allen recorded extensively with Clarence Williams. Allen also accompanied vocalist Bessie Smith on some recordings, and recorded in several bands of King Oliver's.

Allen played in various dance bands through the 1930s and 1940s, then played with Benton Heath in New York City from the middle of the 1940s up until 1963. His last appearance on record was in England with Chris Barber in the 1950s. After 1963 his failing health resulted in retirement from music. He died in New York City on January 28, 1974.

== Playing style ==
"In his early work Allen sometimes used the cackle-like muted timbre employed by contemporary jazz cornetists, and he produced a pleasant tone with a wa-wa mute; on the open instrument he often affected a singing, lyrical style in the manner of Joe Smith, but he showed a substantial New Orleans influence, especially in his lead playing."
