= Six or Seven Times =

1929 song by Fats Waller and Irving Mills

Single by The Little Chocolate Dandies
- B-side: "That's How I Feel Today"
- Published: November 1929
- Released: October 15, 1929
- Recorded: September 18, 1929
- Genre: Jazz
- Length: 3:23
- Label: Okeh
- Composer: Fats Waller
- Lyricist: Irving Mills

Six or Seven Times is a satirical romantic jazz song written by Fats Waller and Irving Mills. The song was copyrighted in November, 1929. The song was first recorded by The Chocolate Dandies in September, 1929, for Okeh Records; their B-side was That's How I Feel Today. A month later, it was recorded by Duke Ellington and his Six Jolly Jesters, with vocals by Freddy Jenkins and Sonny Greer, for Brunswick/Vocalion.

Cab Calloway recorded a popular version for Brunswick on June 11, 1931.
