= Savoy Bearcats =

American jazz band

The Savoy Bearcats were an eleven-piece jazz band, led by Leon Abbey, which was the house band at the Savoy Ballroom in New York City from its opening in 1926 to 1928. The band's name was changed from the Charleston Bearcats while they were at the Savoy. After leaving the Savoy they became known as Leon Abbey's Band.

The band's drummer was Tiny Bradshaw and its bassist was Ralph Escudero.
