= Lawrence Dixon (musician) =

American jazz musician

Lawrence William "Beau" Dixon (September 5, 1894 – January 16, 1970) was an American jazz banjoist and guitarist, best known for his association with Earl Hines.

Dixon was born in Chillicothe, Ohio, the son of William Dixon (1875–1933) and Nettie A. Scott (1871–1929), both natives of Chillicothe, Ohio. Dixon was the second of five children. His father was a farm laborer and part-time musician, from whom Dixon learned to play music from an early age. From ca. 1923 to 1928 he played in Chicago and Columbus, Ohio with Sammy Stewart's Ten Knights of Syncopation, which recorded for Paramount Records. he also worked with Vance Dixon's Jazz Maniacs (1926–1927), Fess Williams (1928), Dave Peyton, Paul Jordan, Clarence Moore, and Grant Williams. In 1931 he joined Earl Hines's band and remained with him until 1937 as rhythm guitarist and arranger. Dixon worked with Franz Jackson's Original Jass All Stars in the Chicago area in the 1950s and 1960s. He died in Chicago, on January 16, 1970, after years of suffering with pulmonary emphysema and tuberculosis.
