= The Washboard Rhythm Kings =

Background information
- Origin: United States
- Genre: Jazz
- Years active: Circa 1930
- Labels: Victor; Vocalion; Columbia; ARC; Decca

The Washboard Rhythm Kings, also known as the Washboard Rhythm Boys (1932), Georgia Washboard Stompers (1934–1935), Alabama Washboard Stompers (1930–1932), Washboard Rhythm Band (1932–1933), and Chicago Hot Five were a loose aggregation of jazz performers who recorded as a group for various labels between about 1930 and 1935. Bruce Johnson played washboard.

== Career ==
The band played good-time swinging music, featuring spirited vocals, horns, a washboard player and occasionally kazoo, and were popular around the time of the Great Depression. They mostly covered current hits from other artists.

Their personnel varied considerably between sessions, with guitarist Teddy Bunn a regular member from 1930 to 1931. Later recordings included singers Leo Watson or Steve Washington, washboard player and vocalist Bruce Johnson (aka Bruce Wiley Robinson), trumpeters Valaida Snow and Taft Jordan, and clarinetist Ben Smith.

Their 1932 recording of "Tiger Rag" has been cited for its "wild, informal feel" as an early precursor of rock and roll. Their music was also highly influential on the skiffle music of the 1950s and later.

For the most part, they recorded for Victor. The "Alabama Washboard Stompers" were on Vocalion. There was a March 8, 1933 session of 8 sides recorded for John Hammond at Columbia primarily for export to the UK. Two of the tracks were subsequently issued in the US on Columbia 14680-D, which was the last issued record on the legendary 13000-D/14000-D Race Series.

They also recorded for ARC in August, 1933 and those sides were issued on their Banner, Domino, Melotone, Oriole, Perfect, and Romeo labels. As "Georgia Washboard Stompers", they were on the newly-formed Decca label in late 1934 and early 1935.

Their song "Pepper Steak" was later sampled in an identically-named song from the indie game Off.

== On film ==
As the Washboard Serenaders, they can be seen in the short films That's the Spirit (1933), Carnival Time (1936) and The Black Network (1936).

== See also ==
- Jug band
- Blues
- Swing jazz
- Origins of rock and roll
