= Fletcher Henderson House =

Historic house in Georgia, United States

- U.S. National Register of Historic Places
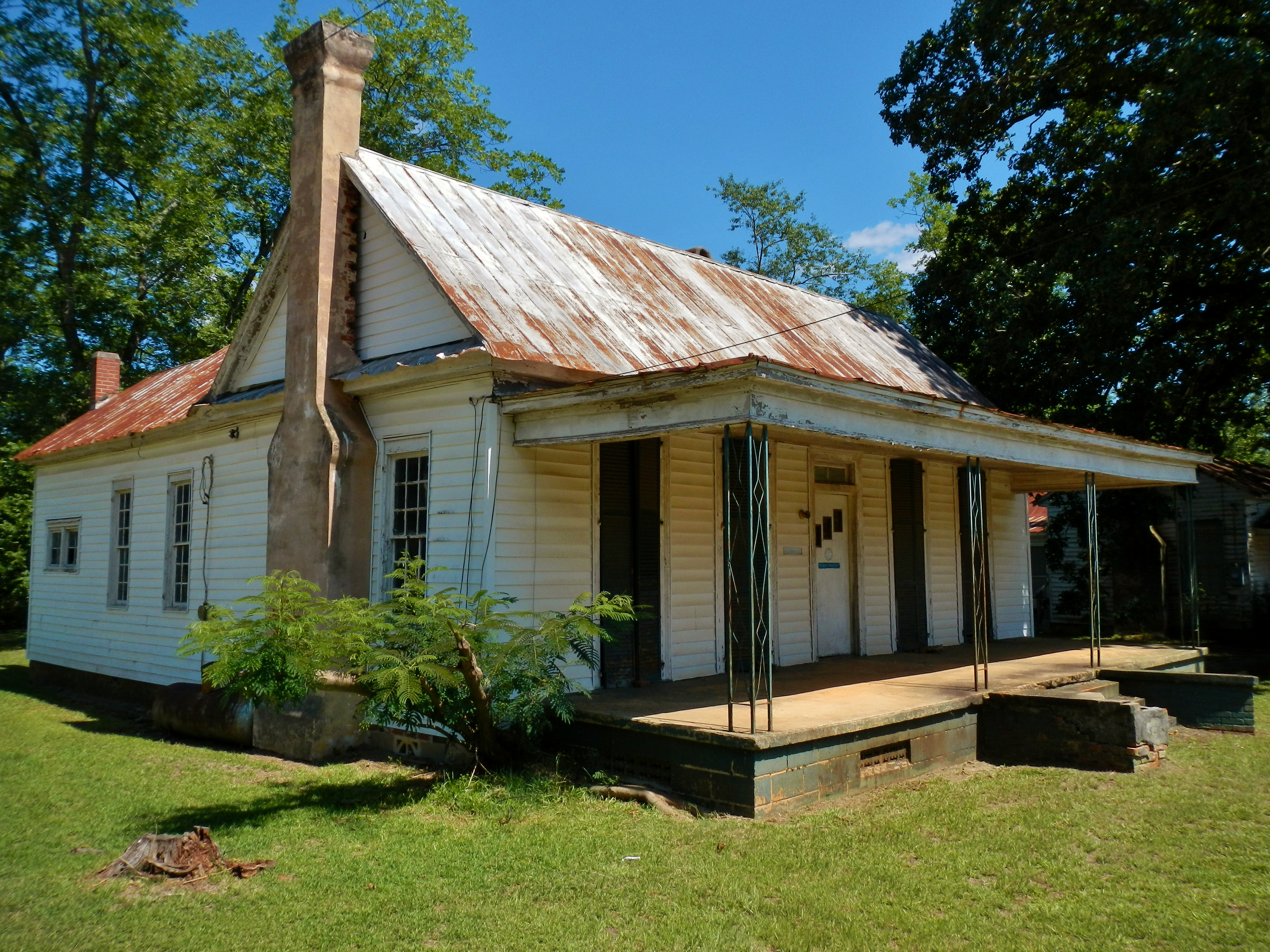

- Location within Georgia Location within the United States
- Location: 338 Andrew St., Cuthbert, Georgia
- Coordinates: 31°45′49″N 84°47′43″W
- Area: less than one acre
- Built: 1888
- Architectural style: Victorian
- NRHP reference No.: 82002460
- Added to NRHP: June 17, 1982

The Fletcher Henderson House, also known as Henderson-Burroughs House, in Cuthbert, Georgia, was built in 1888. It was listed on the National Register of Historic Places in 1982.

The house was deemed significant as the home for 64 years of the leading black educator in Cuthbert, professor Fletcher Hamilton Henderson (1857-1943). It is also notable as the boyhood home of jazz great Fletcher H. Henderson Jr., who was born December 18, 1897, and his brother Horace W. Henderson, who was born November 23, 1903.
