= George Stafford (musician) =

American jazz musician

- Born: c. 1898
- Died: 1936 (aged 37–38); New York, U.S.
- Genres: Jazz
- Instruments: Drums

George Stafford (1898 – 1936) was an American jazz drummer active in the 1920s and 1930s.

== Early life ==
Stafford was a native of the Ozarks, and his sister, Annie Burns, had a professional career under the name Mary Stafford.

== Career ==
Stafford's first major association was with Sam Wooding in Atlantic City in the 1910s. There, he also played in bands behind his sister and Madison Reid. In 1920, he joined the band of Charlie Johnson, with whom he recorded extensively; he also played with Mezz Mezzrow, Eddie Condon, Jabbo Smith, Red Allen, and Jack Teagarden.
