= Charlie Creath =

American jazz trumpeter, saxophonist, accordionist, and bandleader (1890–1951)

Charles Cyril Creath (December 30, 1890, Ironton, Missouri – October 23, 1951, Chicago, Illinois), known as Charlie Creath, was an American jazz trumpeter, saxophonist, accordionist, and bandleader.

Creath played in traveling circuses and in theater bands in the decade of the 1900s, and moved back to St. Louis, Missouri around 1919. There he led bands playing on the Streckfus company's riverboats traveling on the Mississippi River between New Orleans and St. Louis. His ensembles were so popular that he had several bands under his own name at one time in the 1920s. A young Gene Sedric, later a mainstay of Fats Waller's combo and orchestra, played with Creath on riverboats in the 1920s, and perhaps early 1930s. He co-led a group on the SS Capitol in 1927 with Fate Marable.

Late in the 1920s he suffered from an extended illness, and primarily played saxophone and accordion instead of trumpet afterwards. He and Marable played together again from 1935 to 1938, and toward the end of the decade Creath opened a nightclub in Chicago. He worked in an airplane manufacturing plant during World War II and retired in 1945. His last years were plagued with illness.

Aside from his brother-in-law, Zutty Singleton, members of Creath's bands included Ed Allen, Pops Foster, Jerome Don Pasquall, Leonard Davis, and Lonnie Johnson. He recorded as a leader for Okeh Records between 1924 and 1927 billed as Chas. Creath's Jazz-O-Maniacs, which were some of hottest and most collectable jazz items recorded for OKeh's race 8000 series.

== Sources ==
- Leonard Feather and Ira Gitler, The Biographical Encyclopedia of Jazz. Oxford, 1999, p. 155.
- Lawrence Koch, "Charlie Creath". Grove Jazz online.
