= Frank Driggs =

American record producer and archivist

- Born: January 29, 1930; Manchester, Vermont, U.S.
- Died: September 20, 2011 (aged 81); New York City, U.S.
- Occupations: record producer and archivist

Frank Driggs (January 29, 1930 – September 20, 2011) was an American record producer for Columbia Records and a jazz historian and author, known as well for his collection of over 100,000 pieces of jazz music memorabilia including photographs, 314 oral history recordings and other items.

== Biography ==
Frank Driggs first became enamored with jazz and swing music listening to late-night broadcasts from hotels and ballrooms in the 1930s. A 1952 Princeton University graduate with a degree in political science, Driggs moved to Manhattan where he worked first as an NBC page. Later he joined with Marshall Stearns, founder of the Institute of Jazz Studies, and others in documenting jazz history.

In the late 1950s, the record producer John Hammond hired Driggs to assist him at Columbia Records. Soon Driggs was producing records, organizing recording sessions and putting out important re-issues of 78 rpm recordings by Fletcher Henderson, Billie Holiday, Duke Ellington and Gene Krupa. His work at Columbia included producing the first two Robert Johnson albums King of the Delta Blues Singers volumes 1 and 2 and Robert Johnson: The Complete Recordings which earned him a Grammy Award in 1991. Driggs later produced recordings for Epic, Okeh, MCA, Stash, and Time-Life Records. In the early 1970s, Driggs and RCA Records producer Ethel Gabriel reissued an acclaimed series of historic big-band, jazz and swing recordings on the RCA Bluebird label.

Soon after Driggs moved to Manhattan in 1952, he began gathering and saving posters, flyers and ticket stubs, recordings and amateur photographs, providing invaluable information to journalists and music fans decades later that would have otherwise been lost. While much of his collection was publicity stills of Jazz music artists, Drigg's holdings also contained a sizable collection of blues, rock, dance and movie artists. By 2005 his collection had included over 100,000 images. Many of the photographed are not labeled or indexed since Driggs relied on his own system of sorting and his own personal memory of the musicians in the pictures.

In 1977 Driggs retired from the music industry and afterwards made most of his income from reproduction fees from his collection. Many of his images appeared in the 2001 documentary miniseries Jazz produced by Ken Burns for PBS. For many years Driggs kept his collection of images in his basement of his home in Flatbush until 2005 when he moved in with the late musicologist and writer Joan Peyser in the Manhattan borough of New York City.

In 2005, Driggs collection of photographs was appraised at $1.5 million and Driggs made provisions for the collection to be donated to Jazz at Lincoln Center after his death.

Driggs died in his Manhattan home on Tuesday, September 20, 2011, of natural causes. He is buried in Woodlawn Cemetery in The Bronx, New York City.

== Books ==
- Frank Driggs & Harris Lewine Black Beauty, White Heat: A Pictorial History of Classic Jazz 1920-1950, Da Capo Press, 1996 ISBN 0-306-80672-X
- Frank Driggs & Chuck Haddix Kansas City Jazz: From Ragtime to Bebop: A History, 2005, Oxford University Press ISBN 0-19-504767-2
