= Chu Berry =

American jazz saxophonist (1908–1941)

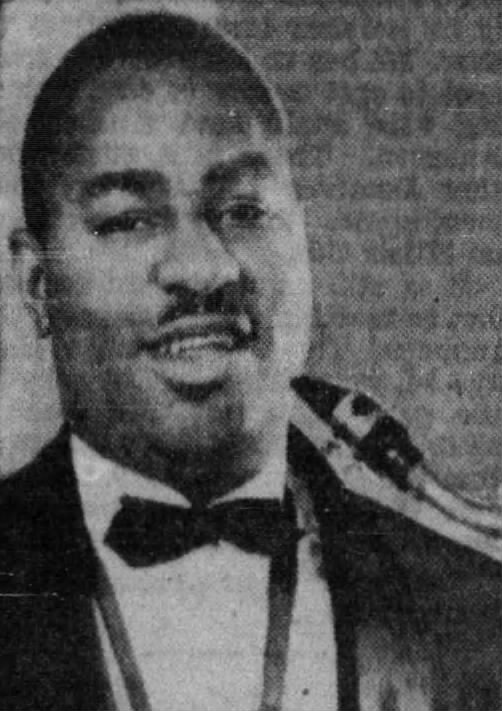

Background information
- Born: Leon Brown Berry; September 13, 1908; Wheeling, West Virginia, U.S.
- Died: October 30, 1941 (aged 33) Conneaut, Ohio, U.S.
- Genres: Jazz, swing
- Occupation: Musician
- Instrument: Tenor saxophone
- Years active: 1930s
- Formerly of: Cab Calloway, Fletcher Henderson

Leon Brown "Chu" Berry (September 13, 1908 – October 30, 1941) was an American jazz tenor saxophonist during the 1930s. He is perhaps best known for his time as a member of singer Cab Calloway's big band.

According to music critic Gary Giddins, musicians called him "Chu" either because he chewed on the mouthpiece of his saxophone or because he had a Fu Manchu mustache.

== Early life ==
Berry was born in Wheeling, West Virginia, to father Brown Berry and mother Maggie Glasgow Berry. He graduated from Lincoln High School, in Wheeling, then attended West Virginia State College for three years. His sister Ann played piano. Berry became interested in music at an early age, playing alto saxophone, at first with local bands. He was inspired to take up the tenor saxophone after hearing Coleman Hawkins on tour.

== Career ==
Most of Berry's career was spent with swing bands: Sammy Stewart, 1929–1930, with whom he switched to tenor sax; Benny Carter, 1932–1933; Teddy Hill, 1933–1935; Fletcher Henderson, 1935–1937; and Cab Calloway, his best-known affiliation, from 1937 to 1941. He is credited with turning Calloway's band into a legitimate jazz orchestra over the four years of his membership.

Throughout his brief career, Berry was in demand as a sideman for recording sessions under the names of various other jazz artists, including Spike Hughes (1933), Bessie Smith (1933), the Chocolate Dandies (1933), Mildred Bailey (1935–1938), Teddy Wilson (1935–1938), Billie Holiday (1938–1939), Wingy Manone (1938–1939), and Lionel Hampton (1939).

During the period 1934–1939, while saxophone pioneer Coleman Hawkins was playing in Europe, Berry was one of several younger tenor saxophonists, such as Budd Johnson, Ben Webster, and Lester Young, who vied for supremacy on their instrument. Berry's mastery of advanced harmony was an influence on Dizzy Gillespie and Charlie Parker. Parker named his first son Leon in Chu's honor.

Berry was among the musicians who took part in the jam sessions at Minton's Playhouse in New York City, which helped lead to the development of bebop.

The song "Christopher Columbus", which Berry composed with lyrics by Andy Razaf, was the last important hit recording of the Fletcher Henderson orchestra and was recorded in 1936. It is one of the most popular riff tunes from the swing era and was later incorporated into Jimmy Mundy's arrangement of "Sing, Sing, Sing" for Benny Goodman's band.

Four sessions were organized with Berry as leader, in 1937, 1938, and 1941.

Berry died on October 30, 1941, in Conneaut, Ohio, after being in a car accident.

== The Chu Berry saxophone ==
A silver-plated Conn 'New Wonder' Series II tenor saxophone, with a serial number which dates manufacture to 1934. It is a very late "Transitional" model tenor sax with split bell-keys, and was manufactured just before production of the Conn 10M started. Berry played a tenor saxophone almost identical to this one. However, the front of the bell of Berry's saxophone was more ornately engraved with various art deco designs.

Chu Berry is the unofficial name of a series of saxophones produced by the C.G. Conn company during the 1920s, though it is more accurate to refer to them as the Conn New Wonder Series II.

The company never officially used the term "Chu Berry" to refer to any of their saxophones. In fact, Berry played a model of tenor sax generally known as the Conn Transitional and is not known to have ever played a New Wonder Series II.

Some saxophone owners use the term "Chu Berry" to refer to any Conn saxophone made between 1910 and the mid-1930s, including soprano, alto, baritone, and C melody saxophones, none of which Berry played.

== Discography ==
=== As leader ===
- "Now You're Talking My Language"/"Too Marvelous for Words" (Variety, 1937)
- "Indiana"/"Limehouse Blues" (Variety, 1937)
- "Sittin' in"/"Forty-six West Fifty-two" (Commodore, 1938)
- "Stardust"/"Body and Soul" (Commodore, 1938)
- "Blowing Up a Breeze"/ "Monday at Minton's" (Commodore, 1941)
- "On the Sunny Sides of the Street" / "Gee, Ain't I Good To You" (Commodore, 1941)
- Chu Berry (Commodore, 1959)
- Sittin' In (Mainstream, 1965)

== As sideman on compilations ==
- 1992 The Original American Decca Recordings, Count Basie
- 1995 The Complete RCA Victor Recordings, Dizzy Gillespie
- 2002 Quintessence : New York-Chicago 1924–1936, Fletcher Henderson
- 2003 Quintessence New York-Chicago: 1933–50, Teddy Wilson
- 2007 The Complete Lionel Hampton Victor Sessions 1937–1941, Lionel Hampton
- 2012 The Billie Holiday Collection: 1935–42, Billie Holiday
