= Sidney De Paris =

American jazz trumpeter

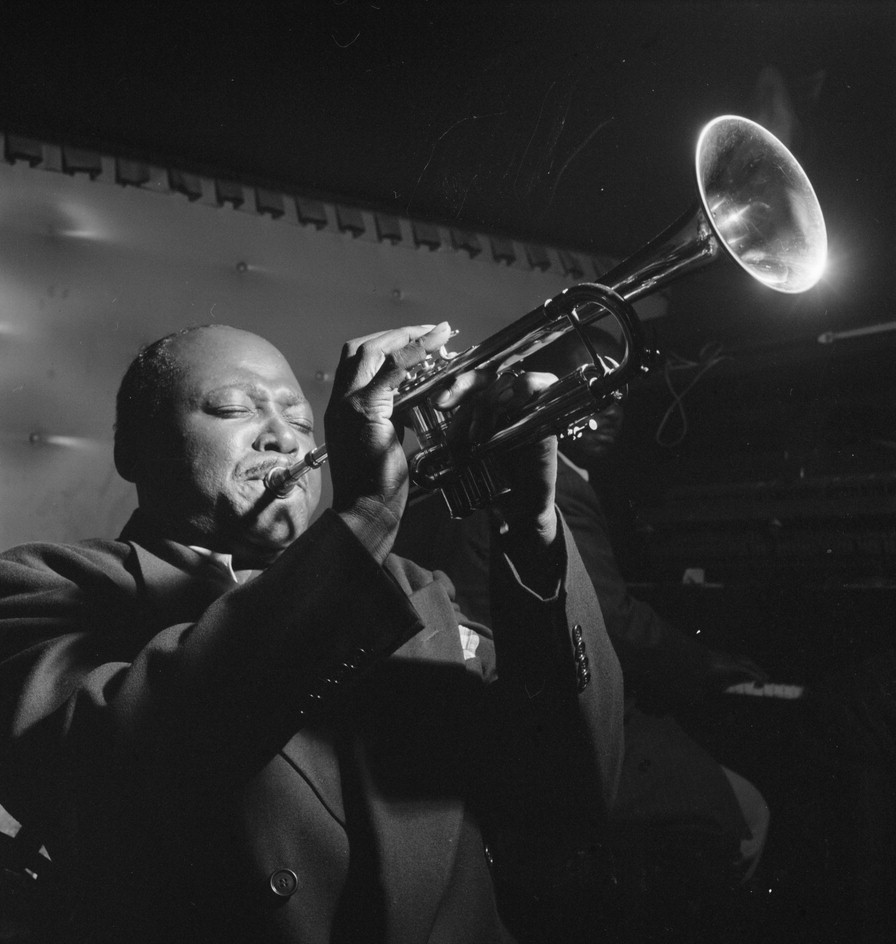
- De Paris at Jimmy Ryan's club, New York City, 1947

Background information
- Born: May 30, 1905; Crawfordsville, Indiana, U.S.
- Died: September 13, 1967 (aged 62); New York City
- Genres: Jazz, swing, Dixeland
- Occupation: Musician
- Instrument: Trumpet
- Years active: 1920–1960
- Labels: Commodore, Blue Note
- Formerly of: Charlie Johnson, Don Redman, Wilbur de Paris

Sidney De Paris (May 30, 1905 – September 13, 1967) was an American jazz trumpeter. His brother was Wilbur de Paris.

He was a member of Charlie Johnson's Paradise Ten (1926–1931), worked with Don Redman (1932–1936 and 1939), followed by periods with Zutty Singleton (1939–1941), Benny Carter (1940–41), and Art Hodes (1941). De Paris recorded with Jelly Roll Morton (1939) and Sidney Bechet (1940), and was part of the Panassie sessions in 1938. From 1947, and throughout the 1950s, he performed almost exclusively with his brother, Wilbur.

He suffered from ill health in the latter years of his life, before he died in September 1967, at the age of 62.

== Partial discography ==
- 1944 - Jimmy Ryan's & The Uptown Cafe Society (Commodore, 1980) - De Paris Brothers, Edmond Hall
- 1944 - Jamming in Jazz (Blue Note, 1944) - Hall-De Paris
- 1951 - Sidney Deparis' Blue Note Stompers (Blue Note, 1951) - 10" reissued as Deparis Dixie (Blue Note, 1944)
- 1951 - Dixieland Hits Country & Western (Swingville, 1962) - Leonard Gaskin Dixielanders
