= Charlie Johnson (bandleader) =

American jazz bandleader and pianist (1891–1959)

Charlie "Fess" Johnson (November 21, 1891, Philadelphia – December 13, 1959, New York City) was an American jazz bandleader and pianist.

Charlie "Fess" Johnson was born 1891 in Philadelphia. Johnson led an ensemble called the Paradise Ten. From 1925–1935, it played at Smalls Paradise, a nightclub in Harlem, and recorded five times between 1925 and 1929. Though Johnson was a capable pianist, he rarely soloed on his recordings.

The Paradise Ten ensemble included trumpeters Jabbo Smith, Leonard Davis, Sidney DeParis, and Thomas Morris, trombonists Charlie Irvis and Jimmy Harrison, alto saxophonists Benny Carter and Edgar Sampson, and tenor saxophonist Benny Waters. Johnson led the ensemble until 1938; following this he freelanced in various ensembles until he retired owing to health problems in the 1950s. He died 1959 in New York City

== Discography ==
Charlie Johnson (1925-29) The Complete Sessions (Jazz Archives No. 78, 1994)
