= Bill McKinney (drummer) =

American drummer (1895–1969)

William McKinney
- Born: September 17, 1895; Cynthiana, Kentucky, U.S.
- Died: October 14, 1969 (aged 74)
- Genres: Jazz
- Instrument: Drums

William McKinney (September 17, 1895 – October 14, 1969) was an American jazz drummer who led a series of musical groups, most notably McKinney's Cotton Pickers.

== Early life ==
McKinney was born in Cynthiana, Kentucky. He worked as a drummer in a circus band, then after serving in the United States Army in World War I settled in Springfield, Ohio where he took over leadership of the Synco Jazz Band.

== Career ==
After hiring drummer Cuba Austin, McKinney worked as leader and business manager. After touring the U.S. Midwest, they got a residency at the Arcadia Ballroom in Detroit, Michigan in 1926. In Detroit they were heard by bandleader and music promoter Jean Goldkette, who arranged a more lucrative home base for the band in Detroit's Graystone Ballroom. The band was renamed McKinney's Cotton Pickers.

After the band broke up in 1934 during the Great Depression, McKinney for a time led and played with a dance band in Boston, From 1937 on McKinney managed a Detroit Cafe with a dance floor and live bands who McKinney booked; he also booked bands for other locations on the side.

Bill McKinney retired in the 1950s and spent his last years in his childhood hometown of Cynthiana.
