= Cuba Austin =

American jazz drummer (1906–1961)

- Born: 1906; Charleston, West Virginia, U.S.
- Died: 1961 (aged 54–55)
- Genres: Jazz
- Instruments: Drums

Cuba Austin (1906 – 1961) was an American jazz drummer.

== Early life ==
Austin was born in Charleston, West Virginia.

== Career ==
In 1926, Austin became a member of Bill McKinney's group, McKinney's Cotton Pickers. Austin joined the group after its formation, taking over from McKinney himself on drums. The group recorded frequently, both under the names Cotton Pickers and Chocolate Dandies.

In 1931, the Cotton Pickers split into two ensembles, with Austin heading one of them, which took the name, The Original Cotton Pickers. When he disbanded this group in 1934, he moved to Baltimore and worked on his own, as well as in an orchestra with Rivers Chambers.

Austin was an influential figure in early jazz; Gene Krupa called Austin one of his major influences. Austin was one of the first drummers to use the newly invented hi hat in hot and swing jazz.
