= New Amsterdam Musical Association =

Founded in 1904, the New Amsterdam Musical Association, NAMA is the oldest African-American musical organization in the United States. It was founded at the time that the American Federation of Musicians Local 310 (now, Local 802) did not admit minority musicians and the law stated that one had to be in the union in order to perform in New York City.

While the New Amsterdam Musical Association has never defined itself as a Jazz-oriented organization, it has certainly been both a literal and figurative home for many jazz musicians. The association became a key cultural reference point for jazz music during the Harlem Renaissance from the 1920s through to the 1950s. Located in Harlem, NAMA has served as a place for many musicians to gather after performances to socialize and to practice. It was not uncommon for the likes of John Coltrane or Max Roach to rehearse on the ground floor of the brownstone. Until the 1990s, NAMA also allowed musicians to board in the upper floors when they came to town. For a spell, Jelly Roll Morton lived in one of the upstairs rooms.

NAMA moved to its current location in 1922. It is no longer union or exclusively a members club, and now functions as a hub for Harlemites, and a testament to the history of African-American musicians in New York City.

Currently, NAMA offers lessons to all vocalists and instrumentalists at all levels at low to no cost, depending on the circumstances of the student. It also holds a host of community events such as jam sessions and barbecues that both serve as gathering times for the Harlem community as well as fundraising events for NAMA itself.

== Notable NAMA members ==
- Buster Bailey (clarinetist)
- Eubie Blake (pianist)
- Charlie Parker (saxophonist, composer)
- Will Marion Cook (composer-conductor)
- Rafael Escudero (tubist & bassist)
- James Reese Europe (bandleader and senior member of the Harlem Hellfighters)
- Craig S. Harris (trombonist)
- John E. Johnson (vocalist, multi-instrumentalist)
- Brooks Kerr (pianist)
- Larry Lucey (guitarist with Duke Ellington's Orchestra)
- Willie J. Mack (multi-instrumentalist, Jazz Art specialist)
- Henry Minton (saxophonist, founder of Minton's Playhouse)
- Gladys Seals (saxophonist)
- Zutty Singleton (drummer)
- Fred Staton (saxophonist)
- Dickie Wells (trombonist)
- Fess Williams (clarinetist)
