= Leonard Davis (musician) =

American jazz trumpeter

Leonard "Ham" Davis (July 4, 1905, in St. Louis, Missouri – 1957) was an American jazz trumpeter.

Davis began his career in St. Louis, playing with the Odd Fellows Boys' Band as a teenager and landing a spot in Charlie Creath's band. Late in the 1920s, he relocated to New York City, where he played in the bands of Edgar Hayes and Arthur Gibbs. He recorded for the first time with Eddie Condon's ensemble in 1929, and sat in with McKinney's Cotton Pickers that same year. In the 1930s he played with Benny Carter, Don Redman, and Elmer Snowden, and did a two-year stint in Louis Armstrong's orchestra starting in 1935. Toward the end of the decade he toured Europe with Edgar Hayes and played in the Blackbirds revue in New York City.

Davis joined Sidney Bechet's revival group in 1940, and also played in bands led by Maurice Hubbard, Albert Socarras, and George James. He continued performing in small-time settings in New York through the mid-1950s.
