= Leo Watson =

American jazz musician and vocalese singer (1898–1950)

- Born: February 27, 1898; Kansas City, Missouri, U.S.
- Died: May 2, 1950 (aged 52)
- Genres: Jazz
- Instruments: Vocalist, trombone, tiple, drums

Leo Watson (February 27, 1898 – May 2, 1950) was an American jazz vocalese singer, drummer, trombonist and tiple player. He was born in Kansas City, Missouri, United States, and is probably best remembered as a member of The Spirits of Rhythm small group, which included guitarist Teddy Bunn. Watson also worked briefly with a variety of big bands, including those of Gene Krupa, Artie Shaw and Jimmy Mundy.

Watson also provided the (uncredited) voice for Prince Chawmin' in the cartoon Coal Black and de Sebben Dwarfs (directed by Bob Clampett, 1943), one of the racially objectionable Censored Eleven; primary voice artist Mel Blanc's contract only allowed for his solo credit. In a 1969 Funnyworld interview conducted by Michael Barrier and Milton Gray, Bob Clampett recalled Watson's name erroneously as Zoot Watson; thus, Leo Watson himself went uncredited for his work in the cartoon for almost forty more years. Finally, Australian voice artist and animation historian Keith Scott discovered his name correctly in the Warner Bros. Archives.
