= Mary Stafford (singer) =

American cabaret singer

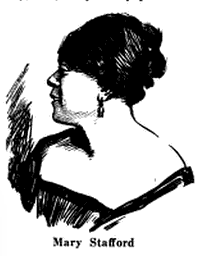
Mary Stafford, from a 1921 publication.

Mary Stafford (ca. 1895 – ca. 1938), born Annie Burns, was an American cabaret singer in the classic blues style.

== Early life ==
Annie Burns was from Springfield, Missouri, United States.

== Career ==
Royal Garden Blues
Mary Stafford's performance of "Royal Garden Blues" in 1921.

In January 1921, Stafford became the first African-American woman to record for Columbia Records. She toured widely throughout the mid-Atlantic states in the 1920s and into the 1930s. She performed at the Lafayette Theater in New York City, where she appeared in Rocking Chair Revue in 1931 and Dear Old Southland in 1932. After 1932 she worked outside the music industry in Atlantic City, New Jersey, where she is thought to have died about 1938.

Among the 14 sides she recorded between 1921 and 1926 were covers of some of the most popular blues of the day, such as "Royal Garden Blues", "Crazy Blues", and "Arkansas Blues". She also recorded "I'm Gonna Jazz My Way Right Straight Thru Paradise" and "Take Your Finger Off It".

Her complete recordings have been reissued in CD format by Document Records on Female Blues Singers Volume 13: R/S (1921–1931) (DOCD-5517).

She was the sister of jazz drummer, George Stafford, who played in her backing band.
