= McKinney's Cotton Pickers =

American jazz band, 1927–1934

McKinney's Cotton Pickers were an American jazz band, founded in Detroit, Michigan, United States in 1926, and led by Bill McKinney, who expanded his Synco Septet to ten players. Cuba Austin took over for McKinney on drums, with the latter becoming the band's manager. Between 1927 and 1931, they were one of the most popular African American bands. Many of their records for Victor were bestsellers.

In 1927, Fletcher Henderson's arranger and saxophone player Don Redman was invited to become the Cotton Pickers' musical director and he assembled a band. John Nesbitt helped Redman with arrangements and rehearsals. The band in 1928 included Cuba Austin (drums and vocals), Langston Curl (trumpet), Ralph Escudero (tuba), Claude Jones, Redman (clarinet, alto saxophone, baritone saxophone, vocals), Todd Rhodes (piano, celeste), Prince Robinson (clarinet, tenor saxophone), Milton Senior (trombone), George Thomas (clarinet, alto saxophone, tenor saxophone, vocals) and Dave Wilborn (banjo, vocals).

Other band members included George Bias (vocals), Benny Carter (clarinet, alto saxophone), Doc Cheatham (trumpet), Bill Coti (vocals), Ed Cuffee (trombone), Lois Deppe (vocals), Jimmy Dudley (clarinet, tenor saxophone), Robert Inge (clarinet, (alto saxophone), Quentin Jackson (trombone), Moxey-Hilton Jefferson (clarinet, alto saxophone), James P. Johnson (piano), Buddy Lee (trumpet), Donald King (vocals), Frank Marvin (vocals), Theodore McCord (clarinet, tenor saxophone), Jim Napier (vocals), Rex Stewart (cornet), and Billy Taylor (tuba). Towards the end of 1929, multiple soloists who were not regular members of the band sat in for a series of recordings. These included Leonard Davis (trumpet), Sidney de Paris (trumpet), Coleman Hawkins (clarinet, tenor saxophone), Fats Waller (piano, celeste), Joe "Fox" Smith (trumpet, cornet), and Kaiser Marshall (drums).

In 1931, Redman left to form a band and was replaced by Benny Carter. The Cotton Pickers disbanded in 1934, unable to make money during the Great Depression. Manager of the band was Jean Goldkette who arranged for the group to record "Birmingham Bertha" for him in July 1929.

A New McKinney's Cotton Pickers was organized in the early 1970s by David Hutson, using the arrangements by Don Redman. The band recorded several albums and featured banjoist Dave Wilborn, who was the only surviving original member. The new group recorded music with Detroit trombonist Al Winters, as well as other leading members of Detroit's jazz scene during the era of the 1970s though the 1990s.

== Discography ==
- 1928–29 - The Chronological McK C P 1928–1929 (Classics, 1991)
- 1929–30 - The Chronological McK C P 1929–1930 (Classics, 1991)
- 1930–31 - McKinney's Cotton Pickers, 1930–1931/Don Redman & His Orchestra, 1939–1940 (Classics, 1992)
