= Kaiser Marshall =

American drummer

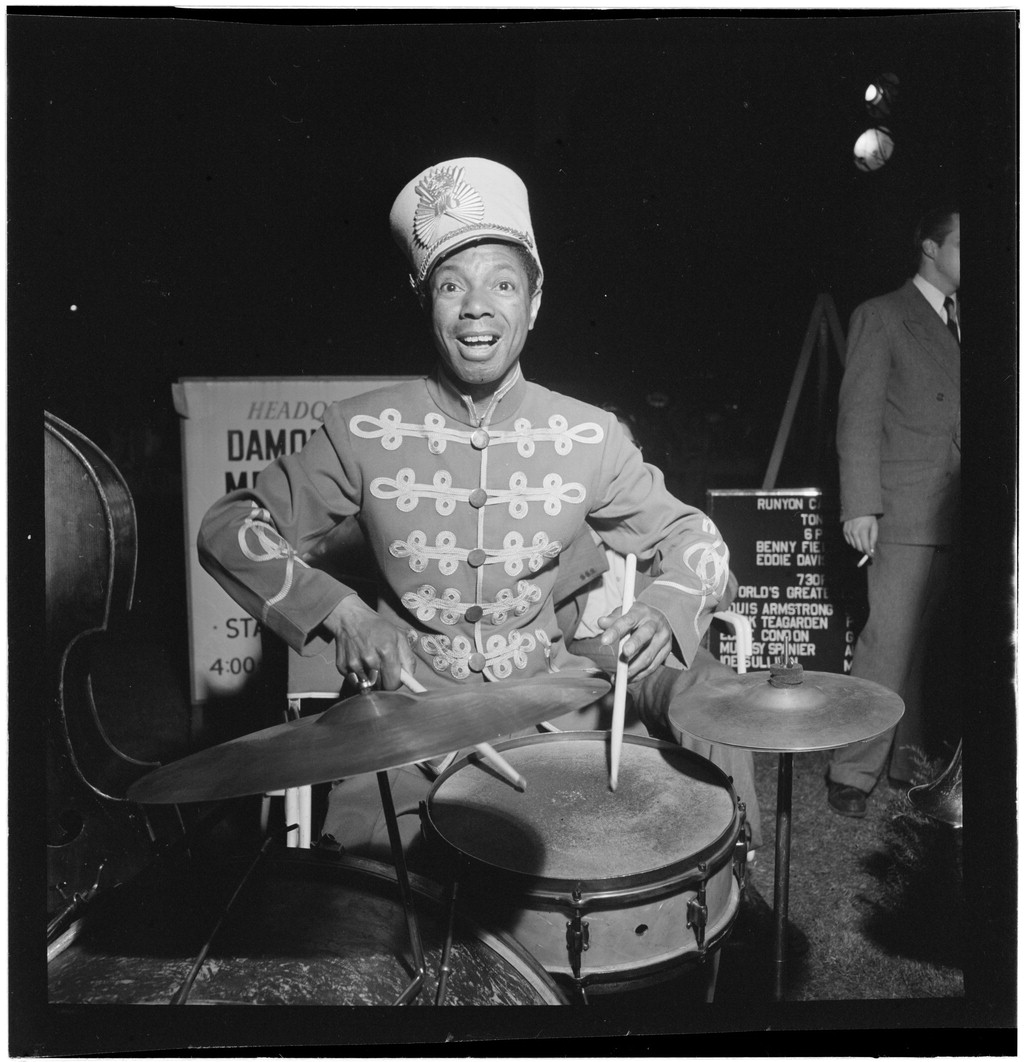
- Kaiser Marshall

Background information
- Birth name: Joseph Marshall
- Born: June 11, 1902; Savannah, Georgia
- Origin: Boston
- Died: January 2, 1948 (aged 45); New York City
- Genres: Jazz
- Occupation: Drummer

Joseph "Kaiser" Marshall (June 11, 1902 in Savannah, Georgia – January 2, 1948 in New York City) was an American jazz drummer.

Marshall was raised in Boston, where he studied under George L. Stone. He played with Charlie Dixon before moving to New York City early in the 1920s. After playing with violinist Shrimp Jones, he joined Fletcher Henderson's band at the Club Alabam, and remained in Henderson's retinue from 1922 until 1929. He played with many noted jazz artists in the 1930s and 1940s, including Duke Ellington, Cab Calloway, Art Hodes, Wild Bill Davison, Sidney Bechet, Bunk Johnson, and Mezz Mezzrow. He also recorded with Louis Armstrong in the late 1920s, being the drummer on Armstrong's recording of "Knockin' a Jug" from March 5, 1929.

In 1928-1930, he recorded with Benny Carter, Fats Waller and Coleman Hawkins in McKinney's Cotton Pickers. And shortly afterrecorded with the Four Bales of Hay, featuring Wingy Manone, Dickie Wells, Artie Shaw, Bud Freeman, Frank Victor, John Kirby and either Teddy Wilson or Jelly Roll Morton.

He also recorded for the Mezzrow-Bechet Quintet (Sidney Bechet, Mezz Mezzrow, Fitz Weston, Pops Foster and Marshall).

== Bibliography ==
- Leonard Feather and Ira Gitler, The Biographical Encyclopedia of Jazz. Oxford, 1999, p. 440.
