= Ralph Escudero =

Puerto Rican jazz musician

Rafael "Ralph" Escudero (July 16, 1898 in Manatí, Puerto Rico – April 10, 1970 in San Juan, Puerto Rico) was a bassist and tubist active on the early American jazz scene.

Escudero began playing bass in a school band at the age of 12, and moved to New York City, playing with the New Amsterdam Musical Association in 1920–21. In 1923 he was playing with Wilbur Sweatman at the Howard Theater in Washington, D.C. when Fletcher Henderson overheard his playing and offered him a job. He remained in Henderson's employ until 1926, when he joined McKinney's Cotton Pickers, where he played and recorded until 1931. In the 1930s he played with Kaiser Marshall, the Savoy Bearcats, and W.C. Handy, then returned to Puerto Rico, playing there into the 1960s.
