= June Clark (musician) =

American jazz trumpeter and cornetist (1900–1963)

- Born: Algeria Junius Clark; March 24 1900; Long Branch, New Jersey, United States
- Died: February 23 1963 (aged 62) New York City, New York, United States
- Genres: Jazz
- Occupations: Musician, boxing manager
- Instruments: Trumpet, cornet

Algeria Junius "June" Clark (March 24, 1900 in Long Branch, New Jersey – February 23, 1963 in New York City) was an American jazz trumpeter and cornetist, and boxing manager.

== Biography ==
Clark, a native of Long Branch, played piano as a child, then took up bugle and trumpet, playing in local brass bands. He took a job as a porter in New Orleans, then played in a musical revue called S.H. Dudley's Black Sensations, where he played with James P. Johnson. Clark and Johnson parted from the show to play on their own, landing in Toledo, Ohio and playing with Jimmy Harrison late in the 1910s. In 1920 Clark relocated to Philadelphia, where he played with Josephine Stevens and Willie "The Lion" Smith (1921–22). He then played in the traveling show Holiday in Dixie, but this enterprise collapsed in Detroit after a poor run, and Clark temporarily took up work in an automobile factory. He rejoined Harrison soon after as a member of the Fess Williams Band.

By 1924 Clark was in New York City, playing with his own band in various nightclubs and other venues in the city. He played with Ferman Tapp, Jimmy Reynolds (1933–1935), George Baquet, Charlie Skeete, and Vance Dixon in the 1930s, but failing health led him to quit music to act as Louis Armstrong's tour manager. He suffered from an extended bout of tuberculosis in 1939, and was bedridden for several years. After his recovery he worked as a musical advisor and assisted Earl Hines. Later in the 1940s he gave up music for boxing, and went on to become Sugar Ray Robinson's manager.

== Sources ==
- June Clark at Allmusic
- Leonard Feather and Ira Gitler, The Biographical Encyclopedia of Jazz. Oxford, 1999, pp. 129–130.
