= Joe Smith (musician) =

American jazz trumpeter (1902–1937)

- Birth name: Joseph Emory Smith
- Born: June 28, 1902; Ripley, Ohio, U.S.
- Died: December 2, 1937 (aged 35); Central Islip, New York, U.S.
- Genres: Jazz
- Instruments: Trumpet
- Spouse: Madeline Adele Belt (m. 1928)

Joe "Fox" Smith (born Joseph Emory Smith; June 28, 1902 – December 2, 1937) was an American jazz trumpeter.

== Career ==
Known throughout his childhood as "Toots", Smith originally started as a drummer but was convinced by Ethel Waters that he was far better as a trumpet player. It has been said that when he reached New York in 1920 he already had a fully formed style, which achieved "the vocalized sound, the blues spirit and the swing which makes for convincing jazz performance".

In 1921, Smith joined the Black Swan Jazz Masters in Chicago, Illinois, directed at the time by Fletcher Henderson who described Smith as "the most soulful trumpet I ever had". He also worked with the Jazz Hounds, the Broadway Syncopators, and finally with McKinney's Cotton Pickers throughout the 1920s. He became famous from his work accompanying Bessie Smith, recording over 30 records. She stated that Smith was her preferred cornetist when recording, due to his reserved additions to her voice. Some of the other artists he worked with include Billy Paige, Noble Sissle, Eubie Blake, and Allie Ross.

Thomas Brothers described Smith as Louis Armstrong's New York City rival, citing Armstrong's description of Smith as "a big prima donna." When recalling his time with the Henderson orchestra, Armstrong insisted that he was forced to cover the high notes Smith could not hit.

== Personal life ==
Smith came from a family of musicians. His father, Luke Smith, Sr., was a bandleader, and six of his brothers also played the trumpet or trombone: Luke, Jr. (1895–1936), Stanley (born 1890), Doonie, Charles (born 1908), Carpathia (1912–2000), and Russell (1890–1966). Three of the brothers played professionally, Russell as first trumpet for Fletcher Henderson's orchestra.

Smith married Madeline Adele Belt on January 12, 1928, in Manhattan. Smith died of complications from tuberculosis on December 2, 1937, in an asylum in Central Islip, New York.
