= Leon Abbey =

American jazz violinist and bandleader (1900–1975)

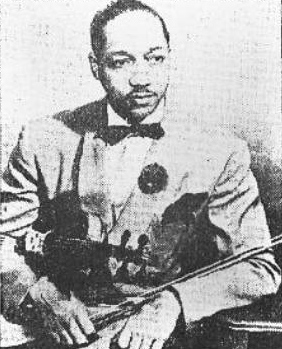
Leon Abbey in 1944 advertisement

Leon Alexander Anthony Abbey (May 7, 1900 – September 1975) was an American jazz violinist and bandleader.

== Biography ==
He was born in Minneapolis, Minnesota on May 7, 1900, to Luther James Robert Abbey and Eva Lee Alexander.

He started his career in 1920 as a classical violinist with the orchestra of J. Rosamond Johnson. Five years later, he recorded with Clara Smith on "If You Only Knowed" and "You Better Keep the Home Fires Burning". In 1926, he led the Savoy Bearcats and toured with the band the next year in Argentina, Brazil, and Uruguay. For a decade, he toured throughout Europe and performed in India two times.

He led a band with blues singer Ethel Waters. In Chicago he led a trio until 1964. His sideman during his career included Fletcher Allen, Emile Christian, Bill Coleman, Peter DuConge, and Crickett Smith. He recorded Jazz and Hot Dance in Denmark (Harmony, 1938) an album as a leader, in Copenhagen, Denmark. It was also issued under the name Whoa Babe.

He died in September 1975.
