= Don Redman =

American jazz musician, bandleader, and composer (1900–1964)

- Don Redman, from I Heard (1933)

Background information
- Born: Donald Matthew Redman; July 29, 1900; Piedmont, West Virginia, U.S.
- Died: November 30, 1964 (aged 64) New York City, U.S.
- Genres: Jazz, swing
- Occupations: Arranger, composer, musician
- Instruments: Clarinet, saxophone, vocals
- Years active: 1920–1960

Donald Matthew Redman (July 29, 1900 – November 30, 1964) was an American jazz musician, arranger, bandleader, and composer.

== Biography ==
Redman was born in Piedmont, Mineral County, West Virginia, United States. His father was a music teacher, his mother was a singer. Beginning by playing the trumpet at the age of three, Redman joined his first band at the age of six and by the age of 12 was proficient on all wind instruments ranging from trumpet to oboe as well as piano. He studied at Storer College in Harper's Ferry and at the Boston Conservatory, then joined Billy Page's Broadway Syncopaters in New York City. He was the uncle of saxophonist Dewey Redman, and thus great-uncle of saxophonist Joshua Redman and trumpeter Carlos Redman.

=== Career ===
In 1923, Redman joined the Fletcher Henderson orchestra, mostly playing clarinet and saxophones.

He began writing arrangements, and Redman did much to formulate the sound that was to become swing. A trademark of Redman's arrangements was the band playing harmony under written solos. He played brass and reed sections off each other in a call-response pattern, having one section punctuate the figures of another, and moved the melody around different orchestral sections and soloists. His use of this technique was sophisticated, highly innovative, and formed the basis of much big band jazz writing in the following decades.

In 1927, Jean Goldkette persuaded Redman to join McKinney's Cotton Pickers as their musical director and leader. He was responsible for their great success and arranged over half of their music (splitting the arranging duties with John Nesbitt through 1931).

=== Don Redman and his Orchestra ===
Redman formed his own band in 1931, gaining a residency at the Manhattan jazz club Connie's Inn. Redman signed with Brunswick Records and undertook a series of radio broadcasts. Redman and his Orchestra also provided music for the animated short I Heard, part of the Betty Boop series produced by Fleischer Studios and distributed by Paramount. Redman composed original music for the short, which was released on September 1, 1933. The Brunswick records Redman made between 1931 and 1934 were some of the most complex pre-swing hot jazz arrangements of popular tunes. Redman's band did not rely on just a driving rhythm or great soloists, but it had an overall level of arranging sophistication that was seldom heard by other bands of the period. The popular vocalist, Harlan Lattimore, provided about half of the vocals during this period. Redman himself was occasionally featured as vocalist, displaying a humorous, recitation-like vocal style on numbers such as "Doin' What I Please" and "I Gotcha."

In 1933, his band made a Vitaphone short film for Warner Bros. (which is available as of 2006 on the DVD of the Busby Berkeley feature film Dames). Redman recorded for Brunswick through 1934. He then did a number of sides for ARC in 1936 (issued on their Vocalion, Perfect, Melotone, etc.) and in 1937, he pioneered a series of swing re-arrangements of old classic pop tunes for the Variety label. His use of a swinging vocal group (called "The Swing Choir") was very modern and quite unusual with Redman's sophisticated counterpoint melodies. He signed with Bluebird in 1938 and recorded with them until 1940, when he disbanded.

When Redman disbanded his orchestra, he concentrated on freelance work writing arrangements. Some of his arrangements became hits for Jimmy Dorsey, Count Basie, and Harry James. He traveled to Europe in 1946 leading an all-star band that included Don Byas, Tyree Glenn, and Billy Taylor. He appeared on Uptown Jubilee on the CBS Television network for the 1949 season. In the 1950s, he was music director for singer Pearl Bailey.

In the early 1960s, he played piano for the Georgia Minstrels Concert and soprano sax with Eubie Blake and Noble Sissle's band.

== Death and posthumous tribute ==
Don Redman died in New York City on November 30, 1964, aged 64, from undisclosed causes.

He was named a member of the West Virginia Music Hall of Fame on May 6, 2009.

== Discography ==
=== As leader ===
- 1931–33 The Chronological D R 1931-1933 (Classics 543, 1990)
- 1933–36 The Chronological D R 1933-1936 (Classics 553, 1991)
- 1936–39 The Chronological D R 1936-1939 (Classics 574, 1991)
- How'm I Doin' Hey Hey (Brunswick 6273, 1932)
- Doin' the New Lowdown (Brunswick 6520, 1932)
- Doin' the New Lowdown (Hep, 1994)

=== As sideman ===
With Fletcher Henderson

- A Study in Frustration (Columbia, 1961) (4lp box set)
- Wrappin' It Up (Membran, 2005)
- Sweet and Hot (Le Chant du Monde, 2007)

With McKinney's Cotton Pickers

- The Chronological McK C P 1928–1929 (Classics, 1991)
- The Chronological McK C P 1929–1930 (Classics, 1991)
- McKinney's Cotton Pickers, 1930–1931/Don Redman & His Orchestra, 1939–1940 (Classics, 1992)
- Put It There, Volume 1 – 1928–29 (Frog, 1999)
- Cotton Picker's Scat, Volume 2 – 1930 (Frog, 1999)
- Shag Nasty, Volume 3 The Alternate Masters (Frog, 1999)
