= Fletcher Henderson =

American jazz pianist and bandleader (1897–1952)

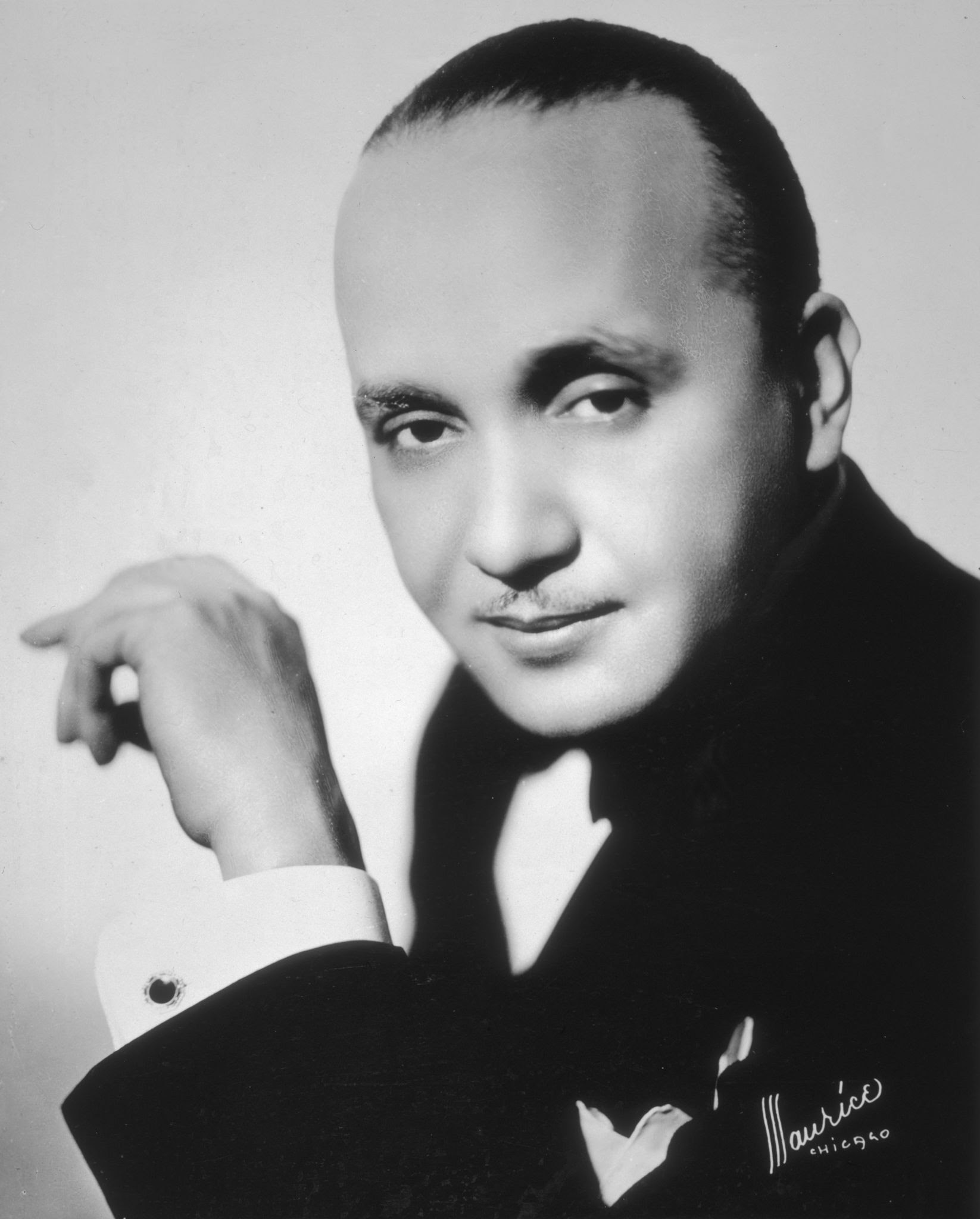
- Henderson in 1943

Background information
- Also known as: "Smack" Henderson
- Born: James Fletcher Hamilton Henderson; December 18, 1897; Cuthbert, Georgia, U.S.
- Died: December 29, 1952 (aged 55) New York City, U.S.
- Genres: Jazz, swing
- Occupations: Musician; arranger; bandleader; composer
- Instrument: Piano
- Years active: 1921–1950

James Fletcher Hamilton Henderson (December 18, 1897 – December 29, 1952) was an American pianist, bandleader, arranger and composer, important in the development of big band jazz and swing music. He was one of the most prolific black musical arrangers and, along with Duke Ellington, is considered one of the most influential arrangers and bandleaders in jazz history. Henderson's influence was vast. He helped bridge the gap between the Dixieland and the swing eras. He was often known as "Smack" Henderson (because of smacking sounds he made with his lips).

== Early life, family and education ==
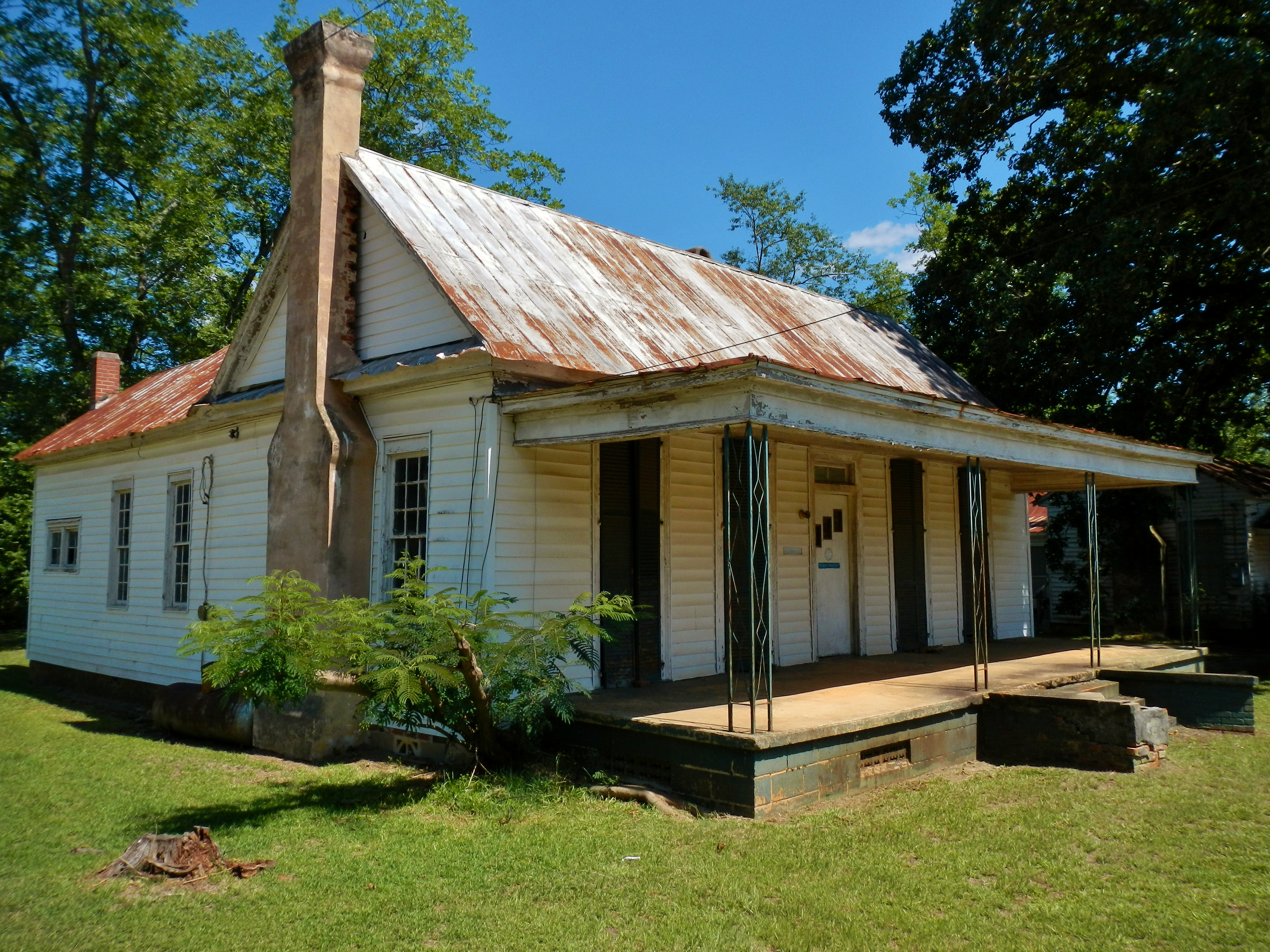
Built by his father in 1888, the Fletcher Henderson House in Cuthbert, Georgia, where Henderson was born in 1897. The house was added to the National Register of Historic Places on June 17, 1982

James Fletcher Hamilton Henderson was born in Cuthbert, Georgia. He was raised in a middle-class African-American family. His father, Fletcher Hamilton Henderson (1857–1943), was the principal of the nearby Howard Normal Randolph School from 1880 until 1942. Their home is a historic site. Henderson's mother, a teacher, taught him and his brother Horace to play the piano. He began lessons by age six. His father would occasionally lock Fletcher in his room to practice for hours. By age 13, Henderson possessed a keen ability to read music and sense pitch. He pursued the studies with his mother and further engaged himself in lessons on European art.

Although a talented musician, Henderson initially dedicated himself to mathematics and science. At age 18, he moved to Atlanta, Georgia, and changed his name to Fletcher Henderson, giving up James, his grandfather's name. He attended Atlanta University (where he was a member of the fraternity Alpha Phi Alpha) and graduated in 1920 with a bachelor's degree in chemistry and mathematics.

== Career ==
After graduation, Henderson moved to New York City with the intention of attending Columbia University for a master's degree in chemistry. However, there is no evidence that he actually enrolled. He did land a part-time job as a lab assistant in a downtown Manhattan chemistry firm, but this only lasted a year.

In New York City, Henderson shared an apartment with a pianist who worked as a musician in a riverboat orchestra. When his roommate was too sick to perform, Henderson substituted, and this soon led to a job as a full-time replacement. In late 1920, he found work as a song demonstrator with the Pace and Handy Music Co. Henderson now found that music would be more profitable than chemistry and left his job as a laboratory chemist to begin a life in music. When Harry Pace left the company to start Black Swan Records, he took Henderson with him to be musical director, a job which lasted from 1921 until 1923. From 1920 to 1923, he primarily played piano accompaniment for blues singers. Henderson toured with the Black Swan Troubadours featuring Ethel Waters from October 1921 to July 1922. After hearing cornetist Louis Armstrong (then around 20 years old) in New Orleans while on tour in April 1922, Henderson sent him an offer, but Armstrong refused because Henderson would not hire Zutty Singleton as well.

Henderson's activities up to the end of 1923 were mainly recording dates for Black Swan and other labels. His band at this point was only a pick-up unit for recordings, not a regular working band. In January 1924, the recording band became the house band at the Club Alabam at 216 W. 44th St. Despite many erroneous publications indicating otherwise, this 1924 band was Henderson's first working band.

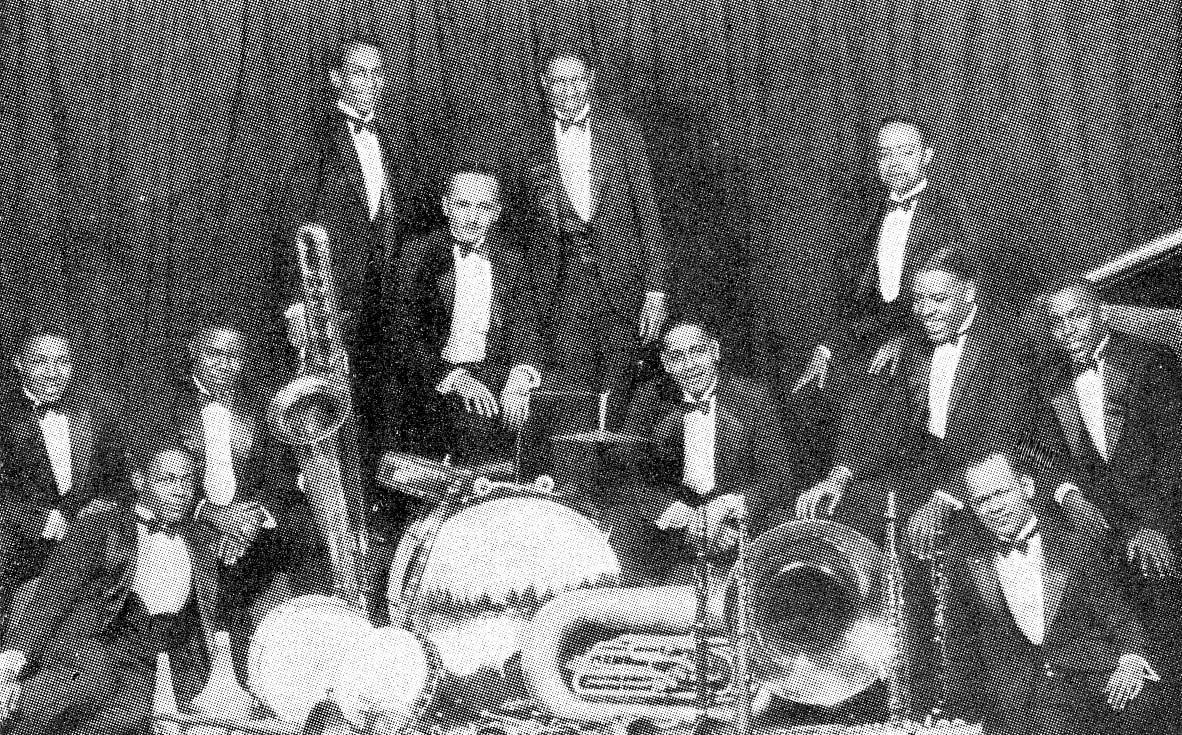
Henderson (middle) with his orchestra in 1925. Coleman Hawkins is sitting on the floor to the extreme left with Louis Armstrong above him to the right. Don Redman is at the extreme right.

In July 1924, the band began a brief engagement at the Roseland Ballroom. Although only meant to stay for a few months, the band was brought back for the autumn season. Henderson called on Armstrong for a second time to join the band. On October 13, 1924, history was made when Henderson's band began their re-engagement at Roseland, with Armstrong now in the orchestra. The band quickly became known as the best African American band in New York. By late 1924, the arrangements by Don Redman were featuring more solo work.

Redman arranged Armstrong's repertoire with the King Oliver's Creole Jazz Band, such as turning "Dippermouth Blues" into "Sugar Foot Stomp". Armstrong played in the band for only a year, because he could not grow accustomed to the arrangements and to the "pretension" of the other band members.

Henderson's band boasted the formidable arranging talents of Don Redman. After Redman's departure from the band in 1927, Henderson took on some of the arranging, but Benny Carter was Redman's replacement as saxophone player and arranger from 1930 to 1931, and Henderson also bought scores from freelance musicians (including John Nesbitt from McKinney's Cotton Pickers). Henderson developed his arranging skills from 1931 to the mid-1930s.

His band around 1925 included Armstrong, Howard Scott, Coleman Hawkins (who started with Henderson in 1923, playing the tuba parts on a bass saxophone, and quickly moving to tenor saxophone and a leading solo role), Charlie Dixon, Kaiser Marshall, Buster Bailey, Elmer Chambers, Charlie Green, and Ralph Escudero. In 1925, with Henry Troy, he wrote "Gin House Blues", recorded by Bessie Smith and Nina Simone, among others. His other compositions include "Soft Winds". Henderson recorded extensively in the 1920s for nearly every label, including Vocalion, Paramount, Columbia, Ajax, Pathé, Perfect, Edison, Emerson, Brunswick, and the dime-store labels Banner, Oriole, Regal, Cameo, and Romeo. From 1925 to 1930, he recorded primarily for Columbia and Brunswick/Vocalion under his own name and a series of acoustic recordings as the Dixie Stompers for Harmony Records and associated dime-store labels (Diva and Velvet Tone). Besides playing at the Roseland, Henderson played at the Savoy Ballroom in Harlem, playing until 3:30 in the morning.

During the 1930s, he recorded for Columbia, Crown (as "Connie's Inn Orchestra"), ARC (Melotone, Perfect, Oriole, Vocalion), Bluebird, Victor, and Decca. Starting in the early 1920s, he recorded popular hits and jazz tunes. In 1924, he and his band recorded 80 sides. His version of the pop tune "I Can't Get the One I Want", recorded about June 19, 1924, was issued on at least 23 labels.

In addition to Armstrong, lead trumpeters included Henry "Red" Allen, Joe Smith, Rex Stewart, Tommy Ladnier, Doc Cheatham and Roy Eldridge. Lead saxophonists included Coleman Hawkins, Buster Bailey, Benny Carter and Chu Berry. Sun Ra also worked as an arranger during the 1940s, during Henderson's engagement at the Club DeLisa in Chicago. Other jazz musicians who also played with Henderson included trumpeter Cootie Williams and trombonist Benny Morton.

Although Henderson's band was popular, he had little success in managing it and was still little-known outside of New York. His lack of recognition outside of Harlem had to do more with the times in which he lived, apparently lackluster management, and the hard times that resulted after the 1929 stock market crash. Henderson had a knack for finding talent, but he did not have much luck keeping it. On many occasions he lost talented members to other bandleaders. He also had trouble with finances. When the band split up in 1934, he was forced to sell some of his popular arrangements to Benny Goodman to keep them together.

After about 1931, his own arrangements became influential. In addition to arrangements for his band, he wrote arrangements for Teddy Hill, Isham Jones and Benny Goodman. His shoulder was injured in an auto accident in 1928. His wife, Leora, blamed the accident for his diminishing success. She said that John Hammond and Goodman bought Henderson's arrangements to support him, that Goodman always gave Henderson credit for the arrangements and said that he played them better than his own. In addition, Goodman and Hammond organized broadcasts and recordings to help Henderson when he was ill.

=== Benny Goodman ===
In 1935, Goodman's Orchestra was selected as a house band for the NBC radio program Let's Dance. Since Goodman needed new charts every week for the show, his brother-in-law John Hammond suggested that he purchase some from Henderson. Many of Goodman's hits from the swing era were played by Henderson and his own band in the late 1920s and early 1930s, usually as head arrangements, which he transcribed from his own records and then sold to Goodman. However, his brother Horace Henderson recounted that the clarinetist made heavy demands on Henderson for fresh charts when his band was engaged for the Let's Dance show in 1934–1935, and that he himself helped his brother complete some of them. The singer Helen Ward also stated that Henderson was delighted to hear the Goodman Orchestra realize his creations with such impeccable musicianship.

In 1939, Henderson disbanded his band and joined Goodman's, first as pianist and arranger and then working full-time as staff arranger. Henderson re-formed bands of his own several times in the 1940s and toured with Ethel Waters again in 1948 and 1949.

Henderson suffered a stroke in 1950, resulting in partial paralysis that ended his career as a pianist. He died in New York City in 1952, 11 days after his 55th birthday.

=== Contributions ===
Henderson, along with Don Redman, established the formula for swing music. The two broke the band into sections (sax section, trumpet section, etc.). These sections worked together to create a unique sound. Sometimes, the sections would play in call-and-response style, and at other times one section would play supporting riffs behind the other.

Henderson was also responsible for bringing Louis Armstrong from Chicago to New York City in October 1924, thus flipping the focal point of jazz in the history of the United States (although Armstrong left the band in November 1925 and returned to Chicago). He also played a key role in bringing improvisatory jazz styles from New Orleans and other areas of the country to New York, where they merged with a dance-band tradition that relied heavily on arrangements written out in musical notation.

Henderson created a band that was capable of playing dance music and complex arrangements. Louis Metcalf said: "The sight of Fletcher Henderson's men playing behind music stands brought on a learning-to-read-music kick in Harlem which hadn't cared before it. There were two years of real concentration. Everybody greeted you with 'How's studying?'"

A museum was established in Henderson's memory in his native Cuthbert, Georgia.

== Discography ==
=== CD Compilations ===
==== Mastered by John R. T. Davies ====
- 1924–25 The Complete Louis Armstrong With Fletcher Henderson 1924–1925 (3CD) (Forte Records F 38001/2/3)
- 1925–29 Fletcher Henderson 1925–29 (JSP Records 311) Columbia singles
- 1925–26 The Harmony & Vocalion Sessions Volume 1 1925–1926 (Timeless Records CBC 1-064)
- 1927–28 The Harmony & Vocalion Sessions Volume 2 1927–1928 (Timeless Records CBC 1-069)
- 1931–33 Yeah Man! (Hep Records CD 1016)
- 1934-00 Wild Party! (Hep Records CD 1009)
- 1924–37 Wrappin' It Up (Marshall Cavendish, Jazz Greats CD 031)

==== Mosaic Records Box Sets ====
- 1923–1934 Classic Coleman Hawkins Sessions 1922-1947 (MD8-251) [Contains 59 performances by Fletcher Henderson and His Orchestra under various pseudonyms]
- 1936–7 Classic Chu Berry Columbia And Victor Sessions (MD7-236) [Contains 24 performances by Fletcher Henderson and His Orchestra]

==== Chronological Classics Series ====
- 1921–23 - The Chronological F H & His Orchestra (Classics 794)
- 1923–00 - The Chronological F H & His Orchestra (Classics 697)
- 1923–24 - The Chronological F H & His Orchestra (Classics 683)
- 1924–01 - The Chronological F H & His Orchestra (Classics 673)
- 1924–02 - The Chronological F H & His Orchestra (Classics 657)
- 1924–03 - The Chronological F H & His Orchestra (Classics 647)
- 1924–25 - The Chronological F H & His Orchestra (Classics 633)
- 1925–26 - The Chronological F H & His Orchestra (Classics 610)
- 1926–27 - The Chronological F H & His Orchestra (Classics 597)
- 1927–00 - The Chronological F H & His Orchestra (Classics 580)
- 1927–31 - The Chronological F H & His Orchestra (Classics 572)
- 1931–00 - The Chronological F H & His Orchestra (Classics 555)
- 1931–32 - The Chronological F H & His Orchestra (Classics 546)
- 1932–34 - The Chronological F H & His Orchestra (Classics 535)
- 1934–37 - The Chronological F H & His Orchestra (Classics 527)
- 1937–38 - The Chronological F H & His Orchestra (Classics 519)
- 1941-00 - The Chronological Horace Henderson 1940/F H & His Orchestra 1941 (Classics 648)

==== Other ====
- 1924–1925 Do That Thing (Frog, DGF87) pre-electric recordings for Vocalion and Pathé
- 1927–1936 The Indispensable Fletcher Henderson (RCA, Jazz Tribune – N° 30) [Victor recordings]
- 1931–1934 Tidal Wave (The Original Decca Recordings), GRP, 1994
- Ken Burns Jazz: Fletcher Henderson, Columbia/Legacy, 2000

=== LP Compilations ===
- A Study in Frustration, Columbia, 1961 [4xLP box set]
- Hocus Pocus, Bluebird Records, 1992
- First Impressions 1924–1931 Vol. 1, Decca Jazz Heritage Series, DL 9227
- Swing's the Thing 1931–1934 Vol. 2, Decca Jazz Heritage Series, DL 79228

=== As arranger for Benny Goodman Orchestra ===
- Sing, Sing, Sing (1992) (Bluebird/RCA)
- The Harry James Years, Vol. 1 (1993) (Bluebird/RCA)
- The Best of the Big Bands [under Goodman's name] (1933–1946/1989) (Columbia)
- Genius of the Electric Guitar (Recorded under Goodman sextet's name, released under Charlie Christian's name) (1939–1941/1990) (Columbia)
