= Drifting and Dreaming =

1925 song

"Drifting and Dreaming, Sweet Paradise," is an American popular song written, copyrighted, published, and licensed by ASCAP in 1925. Lyrics are by Haven Gillespie, music is by Egbert Van Alstyne and Erwin Roeder Schmidt (1890–1966), and Loyal B. Curtis (1877–1947), L.B. Curtis, Music Publisher, New York. It was a major hit in 1926 for George Olsen.

== Selected discography ==
- Ted Lewis, Columbia Records 78 rpm (1925) OCLC 45133984

Recorded in New York City, December 15, 1925
Side A Matrix 141393: Don't Wake Me Up (Let Me Dream) 551-D
Side B Matrix 141394: Drifting and Dreaming 620-D

- George Olsen and His Music, Victor master 19969, 10-inch 78 rpm (1926) OCLC 78595536

Fran C. Frey (1903–1962), Bob Rice, (baritone vocals), Bob Borger (tenor vocal), George Olsen (director)
Instrumentation: 2 violins, cello, flute, clarinet, 3 saxophones, 2 cornets, trombone, tuba, banjo, and piano
Recorded February 16, 1926, in New York City

- Fess Williams and His Joy Boys, Vocalion Records (1928) — reissue as a compilation OCLC 43769939

Fats Robinson (trumpet, oboe), Reuben Reeves (trumpet), Eddie Atkins, William Franklin (trombone), Professor Stanley Williams (clarinet), Ralph Brown (alto sax, oboe), Norval Morton (tenor sax, flute), Clarence Lee, Joe McCutchin, Bobby Wall (violin), Lawrence Dixon (banjo, cello), Sudie Reynaud (bass), Jasper Taylor (drums)
Recorded in Chicago, April 3, 1928
C-1867 Dixie stomp
C-1868 Drifting and dreaming
Note: According to Lawrence Brown of Texas, the above is actually the Dave Peyton pit band at the Regal Theatre, Chicago. Tom Lord's Jazz Discography, lists it under Fess Williams because reissues on LPs and CDs list it as by Fess Williams.

- Orrin Tucker and His Orchestra, Columbia

Matrix LA 2073A (C63-8): Drifting and Dreaming, recorded December 5, 1939, Columbia Master 36227, 78 rpm OCLC 84345674
Matrix LA 2073A: Drifting and Dreaming, recorded December 5, 1939, Columbia Master 35332, 78 rpm OCLC 85003553

- Guy Lombardo and the Royal Canadians, Decca Records (1941) OCLC 192071768

Side A Matrix 69133: Drifting and Dreaming, Kenny Gardner (vocals)
Side B Matrix 69132: When The Organ Played at Twilight
Recorded in New York City, May 5, 1941

- Bing Crosby with The Les Paul Trio, Decca 25185, A-578, 78 rpm (1947) OCLC 276420081

Side A Matrix L 3889: It's Been a Long, Long Time, recorded July 12, 1945, in Los Angeles.
Side B Matrix L 4357: Drifting and Dreaming, recorded February 13, 1947, in Los Angeles.

- Nelson Riddle and His Orchestra, Sea of Dreams, Capitol ST 915, 33⅓ rpm (1957) OCLC 12601637
- Russ Hamilton, Kapp Records (1958) OCLC 13139831
- Vera Lynn Songs of the Tuneful Twenties, with The Mike Sammes Singers and Eric Rogers & His Orchestra, Decca LP LK 4305 (1959)

Recorded April 1959. She had earlier recorded the song on 27 June 1948 with the Robert Farnon Orchestra (Decca F 8943).

- Pat Boone and Shirley Boone - for their album Side by Side (1959).
- Burl Ives - for his album On the Beach at Waikiki (1965).
