= Jazz: The Smithsonian Anthology =

JAZZ: The Smithsonian Anthology

Box set by various artists
- Released: 2011
- Recorded: 1917–2003
- Genre: Jazz
- Length: 7:45:34
- Label: Smithsonian Folkways
- Producers: Richard James Burgess, John Edward Hasse, Daniel E. Sheehy, Atesh Sonneborn

Various artists chronology
Smithsonian Collection of Classic Jazz (1973)	JAZZ: The Smithsonian Anthology (2011)

JAZZ: The Smithsonian Anthology is a six-CD, box-set released by Smithsonian Folkways that covers the history of jazz. The set includes 111 tracks with representative works from many styles, including big band, dixieland, free jazz, fusion, Latin jazz, swing, and smooth jazz. An accompanying 200-page book includes essays, analysis, and photographs.

== Compilation and release ==
Following requests for an update to Martin Williams's Smithsonian Collection of Classic Jazz (1973), Smithsonian Folkways began the process of selecting music for a new anthology in late 2004. Over fifty acknowledged experts reviewed a list of 2,500 potential tracks and agreed that the set should represent the development of jazz through the 20th century. By March 2005, the Folkways staff had compiled a 300-page document explaining the positive and negative aspects of each potential selection.

Smithsonian Folkways formed a second executive committee of five members in June of the same year. To keep the price low the committee reduced their choices to 110 songs on six CDs. In making their decision, committee members concentrated on the historical impact of the recordings and significance of the musicians, rather than the recordings' commercial success.

After years of deliberation, the committee finalized the selections for the anthology. The committee then contacted more than 30 authors to write articles for the recordings that pertained to their areas of research. Smithsonian Folkways released the anthology on March 29, 2011.

== Organization ==
JAZZ: The Smithsonian Anthology is organized chronologically, covering the history and development of the genre from 1899, the estimated date of composition of "Maple Leaf Rag", to 2003, the date of the latest recording. The book focuses on the individual tracks, describing each recording with two to three pages of liner notes. The executive committee chose to place certain songs out of chronological arrangement in order to maximize the amount of space utilized on each disc.

The first disc opens with Dick Hyman's recording of "Maple Leaf Rag", a historically informed performance that imitates the precision of ragtime compositions on player pianos at the end of the 19th century. Midway through the set Sidney Bechet’s 1932 interpretation gives a "hot jazz" interpretation of the Rag. The final disc begins with a modern take on "Maple Leaf Rag," the 1976 recording by Anthony Braxton and Muhal Richard Abrams. Producer Richard Burgess notes these consecutive examples of how jazz progressed function as, "the pedagogical moment... A lot of the thinking behind the set was to make it good for jazz history, jazz appreciation courses."

== Design ==
The design for JAZZ: The Smithsonian Anthology was created by Visual Dialogue, a graphic design company from Boston, Massachusetts. The company used the album cover design from Fred Ramsey's Jazz series on Folkways Recordings by his wife Amelia as their inspiration modifying both color scheme and graphics to create an updated look and feel for the new product. The final box set consists of a 200-page hardcover text within an etched, plastic slipcover. Six pockets hold CDs in the final pages of the book.

The Anthology includes many photographs by the jazz photographer Herman Leonard.

== Reception ==
Time magazine critic Douglas Wolk wrote, "Assembled over seven years, JAZZ: The Smithsonian Anthology is a 6-disc monolith with a 200-page book of liner notes – the best single introduction to America's first great musical form." In the Washington Post, JAZZ: The Smithsonian Anthology was recognized as, "a landmark achievement. It is the most important and most comprehensive collection of historical jazz recordings and will be a valuable educational tool for years to come. But the collection reaches beyond the classroom, capturing something of the spirit of America as well."

Professional ratings
Review scores
Source	Rating
Allmusic	4/5 stars

== Track listing ==
=== Disc 1 ===
1. "Maple Leaf Rag" – Dick Hyman – (1975)
2. "In Gloryland" – Bunk's Brass Band – (1945)
3. "Livery Stable Blues" – Original Dixieland Jazz Band – (1917)
4. "Dippermouth Blues" – King Oliver's Creole Jazz Band – (1923)
5. "The Stampede" – Fletcher Henderson And His Orchestra – (1926)
6. "Black Bottom Stomp" – Jelly Roll Morton and His Red Hot Peppers – (1926)
7. "Singin' the Blues (Till My Daddy Comes Home)" – Frankie Trumbauer And His Orchestra – (1927)
8. "Backwater Blues" – Bessie Smith and James P. Johnson – (1927)
9. "Black and Tan Fantasy" – Duke Ellington And His Orchestra – (1927)
10. "From Monday On" – Bix Beiderbecke & Paul Whiteman and His Orchestra – (1928)
11. "West End Blues" – Louis Armstrong and His Hot Five – (1928)
12. "Weather Bird" – Louis Armstrong and Earl Hines – (1928)
13. "That's a Serious Thing" – Eddie Condon's Hot Shots – (1929)
14. "Handful of Riffs" – Eddie Lang and Lonnie Johnson – (1929)
15. "You've Got to Be Modernistic" – James P. Johnson – (1930)
16. "Moten Swing" – Bennie Moten and His Kansas City Orchestra – (1932)
17. "Everybody Loves My Baby" – The Boswell Sisters – (1932)
18. "Maple Leaf Rag" – Sidney Bechet – (1932)
19. "Dinah" – Fats Waller and His Rhythm – (1935)
20. "Swing That Music" – Louis Armstrong and His Orchestra – (1936)
21. "Honky Tonk Train Blues" – Meade "Lux" Lewis – (1936)
22. "Mean To Me" – Billie Holiday with Teddy Wilson and His Orchestra – (1937)
23. "For Dancers Only" – Jimmie Lunceford and His Orchestra – (1937)
24. "One O'Clock Jump" – Count Basie and His Orchestra – (1937)
25. "Harlem Congo" – Chick Webb and His Orchestra – (1937)

=== Disc 2 ===
1. "Minor Swing" – Quintette du Hot Club de France – (1937)
2. "Mary's Idea" – Mary Lou Williams with Andy Kirk and His Clouds of Joy – (1938)
3. "When Lights Are Low" – Lionel Hampton – (1939)
4. "Body and Soul" – Coleman Hawkins and His Orchestra – (1939)
5. "Honeysuckle Rose" – Benny Goodman and His Orchestra – (1939)
6. "Tiger Rag" – Art Tatum – (1940)
7. "Ko-Ko" – Duke Ellington and His Famous Orchestra – (1940)
8. "Hard Times" (Topsy Turvy) – Cab Calloway and His Orchestra – (1940)
9. "I Can't Believe That You're In Love With Me" – The Chocolate Dandies – (1940)
10. "Stardust" – Artie Shaw and His Orchestra – (1940)
11. "Let Me Off Uptown" – Gene Krupa and His Orchestra – (1941)
12. "Shaw 'Nuff" – Dizzy Gillespie's All-Star Quintette – (1945)
13. "Manteca" – Dizzy Gillespie and His Orchestra – (1947)
14. "Virgo" from The Zodiac Suite – Mary Lou Williams – (1945)
15. "Dexter Rides Again" – Dexter Gordon – (1946)
16. "I Want to Be Happy" – The Lester Young Buddy Rich Trio – (1946)
17. "Indiana" – Bud Powell – (1947)
18. "Embraceable You" – Charlie Parker Quintet – (1947)
19. "Four Brothers" – Woody Herman and His Orchestra – (1947)
20. "Misterioso" – Thelonious Monk Quartet – (1948)
21. "Lady Bird" – Tadd Dameron Sextet – (1948)
22. "Tanga" – Machito and His Afro-Cuban Orchestra – (1948)
23. "September in the Rain" – The George Shearing Quintet – (1949)
24. "WOW" – Lennie Tristano Sextet – (1949)

=== Disc 3 ===
1. "Boplicity" – Miles Davis Nonet – (1949)
2. "The Golden Bullet" – Count Basie Octet – (1950)
3. "Popo" – Shorty Rogers and His Giants – (1951)
4. "Walkin' Shoes" – The Gerry Mulligan Quartet with Chet Baker – (1952)
5. "23 Degrees North, 82 Degrees West" – Stan Kenton – (1952)
6. "Daahoud" – Clifford Brown and the Max Roach Quintet – (1954)
7. "Django" – The Modern Jazz Quartet – (1954)
8. "The Preacher" – Horace Silver and the Jazz Messengers – (1955)
9. "I'll Remember April" – Erroll Garner Trio – (1955)
10. "Jonaleh" – The Chico Hamilton Quintet – (1956)
11. "Tricrotism" – Lucky Thompson Trio – (1956)
12. "St. Thomas" – Sonny Rollins – (1956)
13. "Call For All Demons" – Sun Ra and His Arkestra – (1956)
14. "When I Grow Too Old to Dream" – Nat "King" Cole and His Trio – (1956)
15. "Stompin' at the Savoy" – Louis Armstrong and Ella Fitzgerald – (1957)
16. "Blues in the Closet" – Stan Getz and J.J. Johnson – (1957)
17. "Ol' Man River" – Oscar Peterson Trio – (1959)
18. "Summertime" – Miles Davis: orchestra under the direction of Gil Evans – (1958)

=== Disc 4 ===
1. "Moanin'" – Art Blakey & the Jazz Messengers – (1958)
2. "Meet B. B." – Count Basie and His Orchestra – (1958)
3. "So What" – Miles Davis Sextet – (1959)
4. "Giant Steps" – John Coltrane Quartet – (1959)
5. "Better Git It in Your Soul" – Charles Mingus – (1959)
6. "Blue Rondo à la Turk" – The Dave Brubeck Quartet – (1959)
7. "Ramblin'" – Ornette Coleman Quartet – (1959)
8. "Work Song" – Cannonball Adderley – (1960)
9. "Wrap your Troubles In Dreams" – Sarah Vaughan – (1960)
10. "My Favorite Things, Part 1" (Single Version) – John Coltrane Quartet – (1960)
11. "Waltz For Debby" – Bill Evans – (1961)
12. "‘Round Midnight" – George Russell Sextet – (1961)
13. "Cotton Tail" – Ella Fitzgerald with the Duke Ellington Orchestra – (1965)

=== Disc 5 ===
1. "One by One" – Art Blakey and the Jazz Messengers – (1963)
2. "The Girl From Ipanema" – Stan Getz and Astrud Gilberto – (1963)
3. "A Love Supreme Part I: Acknowledgement" – John Coltrane Quartet – (1964)
4. "E.S.P." – Miles Davis Quintet – (1965)
5. "Haig & Haig" – Clark Terry and the Bob Brookmeyer Quintet – (1966)
6. "King of the Road" – Jimmy Smith and Wes Montgomery – (1966)
7. "Isfahan" – Duke Ellington and His Orchestra – (1966)
8. "The New National Anthem" (from A Genuine Tong Funeral) – Gary Burton – (1967)
9. "Matrix" – Chick Corea – (1968)
10. "Miles Runs the Voodoo Down" – Miles Davis – (1969)
11. "Celestial Terrestrial Commuters" – Mahavishnu Orchestra – (1972)
12. "Watermelon Man" – Herbie Hancock – (1973)
13. "Long Yellow Road" – Toshiko Akiyoshi – Lew Tabackin Big Band – (1974)
14. "Jitney No. 2" – Cecil Taylor – (1974)
15. "Bright Size Life" – Pat Metheny – (1975)

=== Disc 6 ===
1. "Maple Leaf Rag" – Anthony Braxton and Muhal Richard Abrams – (1976)
2. "Birdland" – Weather Report – (1976)
3. "My Song" – Keith Jarrett – (1977)
4. "Iya" – Irakere – (between 1973 and 1978)
5. "Bush Magic" – Art Ensemble of Chicago – (1980)
6. "Steppin'" – World Saxophone Quartet – (1981)
7. "The Glide Was in the Ride" – Steve Coleman Group – (1985)
8. "Manenberg (Revisited)" – Abdullah Ibrahim – (1985)
9. "Nothing Personal" – Michael Brecker – (1987)
10. "Airegin" – Tito Puente – (1989)
11. "Down the Avenue" – Wynton Marsalis Septet – (1992)
12. "Ting Ning" – Nguyên Lê – (1995)
13. "Kilayim" – Masada – (1997)
14. "Hey-Hee-Hi-Ho" – Medeski Martin & Wood – (1997)
15. "Neutralisme" – Martial Solal and Johnny Griffin – (1999)
16. "Suspended Night Variation VIII" – Tomasz Stańko – (2003)

== Production Personnel ==
Executive Producers

- Daniel E. Sheehy
- Richard James Burgess
- Atesh Sonneborn

Produced by

- Richard James Burgess
- Daniel E. Sheehy
- John Edward Hasse

Executive Committee

- David Baker
- José Antonio Bowen
- John Edward Hasse
- Dan Morgenstern
- Alyn Shipton

== Credits ==
- Track Notes Writers: Larry Appelbaum, David Baker, Rob Bamberger, Ed Berger, José Antonio Bowen, Anthony Brown, James Dapogny, Michael Dregni, Digby Fairweather, Will Friedwald, Ted Gioia, John Edward Hasse, Willard Jenkins, Robin D. G. Kelley, Tammy Kernodle, Gene Lees, George E. Lewis, Steven Loza, Jeffrey Magee, John McDonough, Robert O'Meally, Lewis Porter, Bruce Boyd Raeburn, Loren Schoenberg, Gunther Schuller, Alyn Shipton, John Szwed, Jeffrey Taylor, Terry Teachout, and Michael Zilber
- Images: CTS Images, Frank Driggs Collection, Guy Fonck, Andy Freeberg, Institute of Jazz Studies (Rutgers University), Richard Laird, Arturo Sandoval, Duncan Schiedt Collection, Lee Tanner/The Jazz Image, and Jack Vartoogian/FrontRowPhotos
- Advisory Panel: Larrel Appelbaum, David Baker, Malcolm Baker, Rob Bamberger, José Antonio Bowen, Michael Brooks, Anthony Brown, Michael Cuscuna, Francis Davis, Raul Fernandez, Will Friedwald, Mark Gridley, Brian Harker, Willey Hill, Willard Jenkins, Orrin Keepnews, Tammy Kernodle, Bill Kirchner, Wolfran Knauer, Allen Lowe, Henry Martin, James McCalla, David Megill, Donald Megill, John Murphy, Peter O'Brien, Tim Owens, and Bob Porter
- Compilation Mastered By: Pete Reiniger
- Text Editing: Carla Borden and Bob Blumenthal
- Fact-checking, Proofreading: Bob Blumenthal, Carla Borden, Richard James Burgess, James Deutsch, John Edward Hasse, Hannah Korn, Dan Morgenstern, Vincent Pelote, Arlene Reiniger, Lauren Shaw, Atesh Sonneborn, J. B. Weilepp
- Project Director: Richard James Burgess
- Production Manager: Mary Monseur
- Production Assistance: Carolyn Kerchof, Darlene Richardson, and J.B. Weilepp
- Photo Research: Caitlin Coad, John Edward Hasse, Tad Lathrop, Mary Monseur, J.B. Weilepp
- Art Direction & Design: Visual Dialogue
- Manufacturing: Tri-Plex Packaging

== See also ==
- Ken Burns' Jazz
