= The Smithsonian Collection of Classic Jazz =

1973 compilation album

Compilation album by Various
- Released: 1973
- Genres: Avant-garde jazz, free jazz, bebop, hard bop, modal jazz, ragtime, swing
- Length: 369:38
- Labels: Smithsonian Institution, Columbia
- Producer: Various
- Compiler: Martin Williams

Smithsonian Institution jazz compilations chronology
The Smithsonian Collection of Classic Jazz (1973)	The Smithsonian Collection of Big Band Jazz (1985)

The Smithsonian Collection of Classic Jazz is a six-LP box set released in 1973 by the Smithsonian Institution. Compiled by jazz critic, scholar, and historian Martin Williams, the album included tracks from over a dozen record labels spanning several decades and genres of American jazz, from ragtime and big band to post-bop and free jazz.

== Release and reception ==
Professional ratings
Review scores
Source	Rating
Tom Hull	A

Praised from the time of its release as "by far the best anthology of jazz recordings ever issued," it "became part of the jazz curriculum at colleges throughout the country." and over time it was a best-selling, double platinum record.

This collection has been criticized for a number of shortcomings and idiosyncrasies; e.g., Paul de Barros, jazz critic for the Seattle Times, wrote, "Williams also favored black musicians over white (common to his critical generation), overlooked Latin, female and most hard-bop instrumentalists and, as most male jazz critics still do, disdained vocals." However, the collection has also long been widely and highly praised in terms similar to those of Dan Morganstern of The New York Times, who in 1987 referred to it as "by far the best available survey of the recorded history of jazz on concise form."

Critic Gary Giddins posited in 1998 that these traits, its idiosyncratic nature and its esteemed stature, were two sides of a coin: "One key reason Martin Williams's epochal 1973 Smithsonian Collection of Classic Jazz had the impact it did (and went double platinum, not bad for mail order) is that he trusted his own eccentricity, though he would have used a, ahem, different term, like maybe critical judgment."

In 1987 the Smithsonian issued a revised, seven-LP, five-CD, or five-cassette edition of the collection, accompanied by a paperback book by Williams under the same title, with the revised collection including some different tracks, ending with "Steppin'" by the World Saxophone Quartet. The collection was reissued as a five-CD boxed set in 1997 by Sony Music Special Projects, digitally remastered and with some tracks restored to full-length.

In 2011, with this collection out of print, the Smithsonian issued a new 6-CD set Intended to take its place, called Jazz: The Smithsonian Anthology, about which Ben Ratliff of The New York Times wrote, "what the new anthology might make you miss the most is the object it has been designed to replace: The Smithsonian Collection of Classic Jazz, compiled in 1973 and revised in 1987 by the critic Martin Williams." One critic opined that the 2011 anthology's selection by committee, rather than by a single person, "while admirable in principle, guarantees that The Smithsonian Anthology has no point of view." Other critics had similar reactions.

== Track listing ==
Side one

1. Scott Joplin – "Maple Leaf Rag" (Joplin) – 3:16
2. Jelly Roll Morton – "Maple Leaf Rag" (Joplin) – 2:37
3. Robert Johnson – "Hellhound on My Trail" (Johnson) – 2:39
4. Bessie Smith – "St. Louis Blues" (W. C. Handy) – 3:12
5. Bessie Smith – "Lost Your Head Blues" (Bessie Smith) – 2:57
6. King Oliver's Creole Jazz Band – "Dippermouth Blues" (Joe "King" Oliver) – 2:22
7. Jelly Roll Morton's Red Hot Peppers – "Grandpa's Spells" (F. J. Morton) – 2:55
8. Jelly Roll Morton's Red Hot Peppers – "Dead Man Blues" (Morton) – 3:00

Side two

9. Jelly Roll Morton's Red Hot Peppers – "Black Bottom Stomp" (Morton) – 3:14
10. The Red Onion Jazz Babies– "Cake Walking Babies (From Home)" (B. Smith, A. Troy, and C. Williams) – 3:28
11. Sidney Bechet and His Blue Note Jazzmen – "Blue Horizon" (Bechet) – 4:26
12. James P. Johnson – "Carolina Shout" (Johnson) – 2:47
13. Louis Armstrong and His Hot Five – "Struttin' with Some Barbeque" (Lil Hardin Armstrong, Don Raye) – 3:04
14. Louis Armstrong and His Hot Seven – "S.O.L. Blues" (Excerpt) (Louis Armstrong) – 1:05
15. Louis Armstrong and His Hot Seven – "Potato Head Blues" (Excerpt) (Louis Armstrong) – 1:14
16. Louis Armstrong and His Hot Five – "Hotter Than That" (Lil Hardin Armstrong) – 3:02
17. Louis Armstrong and His Hot Five – "West End Blues" (Joe "King" Oliver) – 3:17

Side three

18. Louis Armstrong and Earl Hines – "Weather Bird" (Louis Armstrong) – 2:46
19. Louis Armstrong and His Sebastian New Cotton Club Orchestra – "Sweethearts on Parade" (C. Lombardo and C. Newman) – 3:15
20. Louis Armstrong and His Orchestra – "I Gotta Right to Sing the Blues" (Harold Arlen and Ted Koehler) – 2:59
21. Frankie Trumbauer and His Orchestra – "Riverboat Shuffle" (Hoagy Carmichael, Irving Mills, and Mitchell Parish) – 3:15
22. Frankie Trumbauer and His Orchestra – "Singin' the Blues" (Dorothy Fields and Jimmy McHugh) – 3:02
23. Fletcher Henderson and His Orchestra – "The Stampede" (Henderson) – 3:18
24. Fletcher Henderson and His Orchestra – "Wrappin' It Up" (Henderson) – 2:48
25. Bennie Moten's Kansas City Orchestra – "Moten Swing" (Bennie Moten and Buster Moten) – 3:26

Side four

26. Fats Waller – "I Ain't Got Nobody" (Roger A. Graham and Spencer Williams) – 3:09
27. Meade Lux Lewis – "Honky Tonk Train" (Lewis) – 3:01
28. Benny Goodman Trio – "Body and Soul" (Frank Eyton, Johnny Green, Edward Heyman, and Robert Sour) – 3:30
29. Coleman Hawkins and His Orchestra – "Body and Soul" (Eyton, Green, Heyman, and Sour) – 3:02
30. Coleman Hawkins Quartet – "The Man I Love" (George Gershwin and Ira Gershwin) – 5:10
31. Billie Holiday and Her Orchestra – "He's Funny That Way" (Neil Morret and Richard A. Whiting) – 2:41
32. Billie Holiday and Eddie Heywood and His Orchestra – "All of Me" (Gerald Marks and Seymour Simons) – 2:59
33. Ella Fitzgerald – "You'd Be So Nice to Come Home To" (Cole Porter) – 2:56

Side five

34. Art Tatum – "Willow Weep for Me" (Ann Ronnell) – 2:58
35. Art Tatum – "Too Marvelous for Words" (Johnny Mercer and Richard A. Whiting) – 2:25
36. Jimmie Lunceford and His Orchestra – "Lunceford Special" (Eddie Durham) – 2:51
37. Gene Krupa and His Orchestra – "Rockin' Chair" (Carmichael) – 3:02
38. Roy Eldridge and Benny Carter – "I Can't Believe That You're in Love with Me" (Excerpt) (Clarence Gaskill and McHugh) – 3:02
39. Lionel Hampton – "When Lights Are Low" (Benny Carter) – 2:15
40. Count Basie and His Orchestra – "Doggin' Around" (Edgar Battle and Herschel Evans) – 2:57
41. Count Basie – "Taxi War Dance" (Basie and Lester Young) – 2:55

Side six

42. Count Basie's Kansas City Seven – "Lester Leaps In" (Young) – 3:14
43. Benny Goodman Sextet – "I Found a New Baby" (Jack Palmer and Spencer Williams) – 2:57
44. Benny Goodman Sextet and Charlie Christian – "Blues Sequence" (From Breakfast Feud) (Goodman) – 2:24
45. Duke Ellington and His Orchestra – "East St. Louis Toodle-Oo" (Ellington and Bubber Miley) – 3:38
46. Duke Ellington and His Famous Orchestra – "New East St. Louis Toodle-Oo" (Ellington and Miley) – 3:04
47. Duke Ellington and His Famous Orchestra – "Creole Rhapsody" (Ellington) – 6:00
48. Duke Ellington and His Orchestra – "Harlem Air Shaft" (Ellington) – 3:00
49. Duke Ellington and His Orchestra – "Concerto for Cootie" (Ellington) – 3:22

Side seven

50. Duke Ellington and His Orchestra – "In a Mellotone" (Ellington) – 3:19
51. Duke Ellington and His Orchestra – "Ko-Ko" (Ellington) – 2:42
52. Duke Ellington and His Orchestra – "Blue Serge" (Mercer Ellington) – 3:22
53. Don Byas – "I Got Rhythm" (George Gershwin and Ira Gershwin) – 5:07
54. Dizzy Gillespie Sextet – "I Can't Get Started" (Vernon Duke and Ira Gershwin) – 3:08
55. Dizzy Gillespie's All Star Quintet – "Shaw 'Nuff" (Gillespie and Parker) – 2:57
56. Charlie Parker's Re-Boppers – "KoKo" (Parker) – 2:57
57. Charlie Parker – "Embraceable You" (Excerpt) (George Gershwin and Ira Gershwin) – 2:14
58. Charlie Parker – "Embraceable You" (Alternate Version) (Excerpt) (George Gershwin and Ira Gershwin) – 2:01

Side eight

59. Charlie Parker Quintet – "Klacktoveedsedsteen" (Parker) – 3:02
60. Charlie Parker Sextet – "Little Benny" (Benny Harris) – 3:30
61. Charlie Parker's All Stars – "Parker's Mood" (Parker) – 3:01
62. Erroll Garner – "Fantasy On 'Frankie and Johnny" (Garner) – 2:55
63. Bud Powell Trio – "Somebody Loves Me" (Buddy DeSylva, George Gershwin, and Ballard MacDonald) – 2:48
64. Sarah Vaughan – "Dancing in the Dark" (Howard Dietz and Arthur Schwartz) – 2:37
65. Sarah Vaughan – "Ain't No Use" (Leroy Kirkland and Sidney J. Wyche) – 3:55
66. Lennie Tristano – "Crosscurrent" (Lennie Tristano) – 2:52

Side nine

67. Miles Davis and His Orchestra – "Boplicity" (Gil Evans and Cleo Henry) – 3:02
68. Tadd Dameron's Sextet – "Lady Bird" (Tadd Dameron) – 2:54
69. Dexter Gordon Quartet – "Bikini" (Gordon) – 3:32
70. Thelonious Monk Quartet – "Misterioso" (Monk) – 3:22
71. Thelonious Monk Quintet – "Criss-Cross" (Monk) – 3:00
72. Thelonious Monk – "Evidence" (Monk) – 2:35
73. Thelonious Monk Quintet – "Smoke Gets in Your Eyes" (Otto Harbach and Jerome Kern) – 4:32
74. Thelonious Monk – "I Should Care" (Sammy Cahn, Axel Stordahl, and Paul Weston) – 3:16

Side ten

75. Thelonious Monk – "Blues Improvisation" (Excerpt from "Bags' Groove") (Milt Jackson) – 2:54
76. Miles Davis with Gil Evans' Orchestra – "Summertime" (George Gershwin) – 3:22
77. Sonny Rollins Quartet – "Blue 7" (Rollins) – 11:22
78. Modern Jazz Quartet – "Django" (John Lewis) – 5:34
79. Charles Mingus and His Orchestra – "Hora Decubitus" (Mingus) – 4:44

Side eleven

80. Sonny Rollins Plus 4 – "Pent-Up House" (Excerpt) (Rollins) – 7:32
81. Cecil Taylor – "Enter Evening" (Taylor) – 11:05
82. Miles Davis Sextet – "So What" (Davis) – 9:11

Side twelve

83. Ornette Coleman – "Lonely Woman" (Coleman) – 5:02
84. Ornette Coleman – "Congeniality" (Coleman) – 6:45
85. Ornette Coleman – "Free Jazz" (Excerpt) (Coleman) – 10:14
86. John Coltrane – "Alabama" (Coltrane) – 5:07

== Personnel ==
- Sidney Dillon Ripley – foreword
- Martin Williams – compilation and liner notes

"Maple Leaf Rag" (Joplin recording)
Scott Joplin – piano
Recorded in New York City in April 1916 and released on Biograph Records as BLP 1006Q

"Maple Leaf Rag (Morton recording)
Jelly Roll Morton – piano
Recorded in Washington, D.C., in May 1938 for the Library of Congress and released on Riverside Records as Riverside 9003 and 140

"Hellhound on My Trail"
Robert Johnson – vocals, guitar
Recorded in Dallas, Texas on June 20, 1937, for American Record Co. and released on CBS Columbia Records as Columbia CL 1654

"St. Louis Blues"
Louis Armstrong – cornet
Fred Longshaw – reed organ
Bessie Smith – vocals
Recorded in New York City on January 14, 1925, for Columbia Records and released on Columbia CBS Records as Columbia G 30818

"Lost Your Head Blues"
Fletcher Henderson – piano
Bessie Smith – vocals
Joe Smith – cornet
Recorded in New York City on March 18, 1926, for Columbia Records and released as Columbia G 31093

"Dippermouth Blues"
Lil Hardin Armstrong – piano
Louis Armstrong – cornet
Baby Dodds – drums
Johnny Dodds – clarinet
Honoré Dutrey – trombone
Joe "King" Oliver – cornet
Bud Scott – banjo, vocals
Recorded in Chicago, Illinois on June 23, 1923, for Okeh Records and released as Epic LN 16003 and Swaggie ST1257

"Grandpa's Spells"
Andrew Hilaire – drums
John Lindsay – double bass
George Mitchell – trumpet
Jelly Roll Morton – piano
Kid Ory – trombone
Johnny St. Cyr – guitar, banjo
Omer Simeon – clarinet
Recorded in Chicago, Illinois on December 16, 1926, for RCA Victor Records and released as RCA Victor LPM 1649

"Dead Man Blues"
Barney Bigard – clarinet
Andrew Hilaire – drums
Darnell Howard – clarinet
John Lindsay – double bass
George Mitchell – trumpet
Jelly Roll Morton – piano
Kid Ory – trombone
Johnny St. Cyr – banjo
Omer Simeon – clarinet solo
Recorded in Chicago, Illinois on September 21, 1926, for RC Victor Records and released as RCA Victor LPM 1649

"Black Bottom Stomp"
Andrew Hillaire – drums
John Lindsay – double bass
George Mitchell – trumpet
Jelly Roll Morton – piano
Kid Ory – trombone
Johnny St. Cyr – banjo
Omer Simeon – clarinet
Recorded in Chicago, Illinois on September 15, 1926, for RCA Victor Records and released as RCA Victor LPM 1649

"Cake Walking Babies (From Home)"
Louis Armstrong – cornet
Sidney Bechet – soprano saxophone
Buddy Christian – banjo
Alberta Hunter – vocals
Charlie Irvis – trombone
Clarence Todd – vocals
Clarence Williams – piano
Recorded in New York City on December 22, 1924, for Gennett Records and released on Milestone Records as Milestone 47017

"Blue Horizon"
Sidney Bechet – clarinet
Vic Dickenson – trombone
Pops Foster – double bass
Art Hodes – piano
Manzie Johnson – drums
Sidney De Paris – trumpet
Recorded in New York City on December 20, 1944, for Blue Note Records and released as Blue Note BSP 81201

"Carolina Shout"
James P. Johnson – piano
Recorded in New York City on October 18, 1921, for Okeh Records and released on Columbia Records as CL 1780

"Struttin' with Some Barbeque"
Lil Armstrong – piano
Louis Armstrong – cornet
Johnny Dodds – clarinet
Kid Ory – trombone
Johnny St. Cyr – banjo
Recorded in Chicago, Illinois on December 9, 1927, for Okeh Records and released on Columbia Records as Columbia CL 852

"S.O.L. Blues"
Lil Armstrong – piano
Louis Armstrong – cornet, vocals
Pete Briggs – bass brass
Baby Dodds – drums
Johnny Dodds – clarinet
Johnny St. Cyr – banjo
John Thomas – trombone
Recorded in Chicago, Illinois on May 14, 1927, for Okeh Records and released on Columbia Records as Columbia CL 852

"Potato Head Blues"
Lil Armstrong – piano
Louis Armstrong – cornet, vocals
Pete Briggs – bass brass
Baby Dodds – drums
Johnny Dodds – clarinet
Johnny St. Cyr – banjo
John Thomas – trombone
Recorded in Chicago, Illinois on May 13, 1927, for Okeh Records and released on Columbia Records as Columbia G 30416

"Hotter Than That"
Lil Armstrong – piano
Louis Armstrong – cornet, vocals
Johnny Dodds – clarinet
Lonnie Johnson – guitar
Kid Ory – trombone
Johnny St. Cyr – banjo
Recorded in Chicago, Illinois on December 13, 1927, for Okeh Records and released on Columbia Records as Columbia CL 851

"West End Blues"
Louis Armstrong – trumpet, vocals
Mancy Carr – banjo, vocals
Earl Hines – piano, vocals
Fred Robinson – trombone
Zutty Singleton – drums
Jimmy Strong – clarinet
Recorded in Chicago, Illinois on June 28, 1928, for Okeh Records and released on Columbia Records as Columbia G 30416

"Weather Bird"
Louis Armstrong – trumpet
Earl Hines – piano
Recorded in Chicago, Illinois on December 5, 1928, for Okeh Records and released on Columbia Records as Columbia CL 853

"Sweethearts on Parade"
Louis Armstrong – trumpet, vocals
Harvey Brooks – piano
Lawrence Brown – trombone
Ceele Burke – banjo, steel guitar
L. Z. Cooper – piano
Leon Elkins – trumpet
William Franz – tenor saxophone
Lionel Hampton – drums
Leon Herriford – alto saxophone
Reggie Jones – tuba
Willie Stark – alto saxophone
Recorded in Los Angeles, California on December 23, 1930, for Okeh Records and released on Parlophone as PMC 7098 and Biograph Records as BLPC-5

"I Gotta Right to Sing the Blues"
Louis Armstrong – trumpet, vocals
Scoville Brown – alto saxophone, clarinet
Budd Johnson – tenor saxophone, clarinet
Keg Johnson – trombone
Mike McKendrick – banjo, guitar
Bill Oldham – double bass
George Oldham – alto saxophone, clarinet
Yank Porter – drums
Zilner Randolph – trumpet
Elmer Whitlock – trumpet
Teddy Wilson – piano
Recorded in Chicago, Illinois on January 26, 1933, for RCA Victor Records and released as RCA Victor LPM 2322

"Riverboat Shuffle"
Bix Beiderbecke – cornet
Red Ingle – alto saxophone
Eddie Lang – banjo, guitar
Chaunsey Morehouse – drums
Don Murray – clarinet, baritone saxophone
Bill Rank – trombone
Itzy Riskin – pirano
Frankie Trumbauer – C-melody saxophone
Recorded in New York City on May 9, 1927, for Okeh Records and released on CBS Columbia Records as Columbia CL 845

"Singin' the Blues"
Bix Beiderbecke – cornet
Jimmy Dorsey – alto saxophone, clarinet
Eddie Lang – guitar
Chaunsey Morehouse – drums
Bill Rank – trombone
Itzy Riskin – piano
Frankie Trumbauer – C-melody saxophone
Recorded in New York City on February 4, 1927, for Okeh Records and released on CBS Columbia Records as Columbia CL 845

"The Stampede"
Buster Bailey – alto saxophone, clarinet
Ralph Escudiro – tuba
Coleman Hawkins – clarinet, tenor saxophone
Kaiser Marshall – drums
Don Redman – alto saxophone, arrangement, clarinet
Joe Smith – cornet
Russell Smith – trumpet
Rex Stewart – cornet
[Unknown] – banjo
[Unknown] – trombeone
Recorded in New York City on May 14, 1926, for Columbia Records and released on CBS Columbia Records as Columbia C4L 19

"Wrappin' It Up"
Red Allen – trumpet
Buster Bailey – alto saxophone, clarinet
Fletcher Henderson – arrangement
Horace Henderson – piano
Elmer James – string bass
Hilton Jefferson – alto saxophone, clarinet
Keg Johnson – trombone
Walter Johnson – drums
Claude Jones – trombone
Lawrence Lucie – guitar
Russell Procope – double bass
Irving Randolph – trumpet
Russell Smith – trumpet
Ben Webster – tenor saxophone
Recorded in New York City on September 12, 1934, for Brunswick Records and released on Decca Records as Decca DL 79228

"Moten Swing"
Eddie Barefield – alto saxophone, clarinet
Count Basie – piano
Leroy Berry – guitar
Eddie Durham – alto saxophone, guitar, and trombone
Joe Keys – trumpet
Willie McWashington – drum
Dan Minor – trombone
Hot Lips Page – trumpet
Walter Page – double bass
Dee Stewart – trumpet
Jack Washington – alto and baritone saxophone
Ben Webster – tenor saxophone
Recorded in Camden, New Jersey on December 13, 1932, for RCA Victor Records and released as RCA Victor Vintage LPV-514

"I Ain't Got Nobody"
Fats Waller – piano
Recorded in New York City on June 11, 1937, for RCA Victor Records and released as RCA 730.570 in France

"Honky Tonk Train"
Meade Lewis – piano
Recorded in Chicago, Illinois on March 7, 1937, for RCA Victor Records and released on RCA Victor Records as LPM 2321 and RCA Camden as Camden CA L 328

"Body and Soul" (Goodman recording)
Benny Goodman – clarinet
Gene Krupa – drums
Teddy Wilson – piano
Recorded in New York City on July 13, 1935, for RCA Victor Records and released as RCA Victor LPM 226

"Body and Soul" (Hawkins recording)
Jackie Fields – alto saxophone
Joe Guy – trumpet
Earl Hardy – trombone
Coleman Hawkins – tenor saxophone
Arthur Herbert – drums
Tommy Lindsay – trumpet
Eustis Moore – alto saxophone
Gene Rodgers – piano
William Oscar Smith – double bass
Recorded in New York City on October 11, 1939, for RCA Victor Records and released as RCA Victor LPV 501

"The Man I Love"
Coleman Hawkins – tenor saxophone
Eddie Heywood – piano
Shelly Manne – drums
Oscar Pettiford – double bass
Recorded in New York City on December 23, 1943, for Flying Dutchman Records and released as Flying Dutchman FD-10146

"He's Funny That Way"
Buster Bailey – clarinet
Buck Clayton – trumpet
Freddy Greene – guitar
Billie Holiday – vocals
Jo Jones – drums
Walter Page – double bass
Claude Thornhill – piano
Lester Young – tenor saxophone
Recorded in New York City on September 13, 1937, for Okeh Records and released on CBS Columbia Records as Columbia K9 32127

"All of Me"
Eddie Barefield – alto saxophone
Kenny Clarke – drums
John Collins – guitar
Shad Collins – trumpet
Eddie Heywood – piano
Billie Holiday – vocals
Leslie Johnakins – alto saxophone
Ted Sturgis – double bass
Lester Young – tenor saxophone
Recorded in New York City on March 21, 1941, for Okeh Records and released on CBS Columbia Records as Columbia K9 32124 and Columbia 32060

"You'd Be So Nice to Come Home To"
Roy Eldridge – trumpet
Ella Fitzgerald – vocals
Tommy Flanagan – piano
Gus Johnson – drums
Bill Yancey – double bass
Recorded in Antibe, Provence-Alpes-Côte d'Azur, France in July 1964 for Verve Records and released as Verve V/V6-4065

"Willow Weep for Me"
Art Tatum – piano
Recorded in New York City on July 13, 1949, for Capitol Records and released as Capitol M-11028

"Too Marvelous for Words"
Art Tatum – piano
Recorded in Hollywood, California in late 1956 for 20th Century Fox Records and released as 20th Century-Fox TCF 102-2 and Movietone 72021
