= Fess Williams and his Royal Flush Orchestra =

Band of Fess Williams

Background information
- Genres: Jazz, big band
- Years active: 1924–1930
- Labels: Victor, Vocalion, Gennett, Okeh, Brunswick, Champion, and Harmony

Fess Williams and his Royal Flush Orchestra was an American jazz band based in New York City, and the main band of clarinettist Fess Williams from 1924 to 1930.

== Brief history ==
Williams formed the Royal Flush Orchestra by 1924. The popular hot jazz outfit held residency at Harlem's Savoy Ballroom for most of its life and recorded on the Victor, Vocalion, Gennett, Okeh, Brunswick, Champion, and Harmony labels. Williams, Frank Marvin, and Perry Smith supplied vocals. The flamboyant Williams typically performed wearing a white suit and top hat.

In 1928, Williams traveled to Chicago, where he temporarily fronted Dave Peyton's band at the Regal Theatre. Calling the group Fess Williams and His Joy Boys, he recorded two sides with them for Vocalion. The Royal Flush Orchestra continued to operate in his absence, and in 1929, he returned to New York to resume his duties. They were described as "the acknowledged leaders of colored musical entertainers in American today," when they played in Scranton in 1929.

The Royal Flush Orchestra recorded its last side in 1930. They played in Scranton again in 1931. They often performed radio concerts as publicity for live appearances.

== Orchestra members ==
- Ralph Bedell – drums
- Ollie Blackwell – banjo
- Ralph Brown – alto saxophone
- Emanuel Casamore – tuba
- Emanuel Clark – trumpet
- Henry Duncan – piano
- Felix Gregory – clarinet, alto saxophone, tenor saxophone
- Bobby Holmes – clarinet, alto saxophone
- David "Jelly" James – trombone
- Lockwood Lewis – clarinet, alto saxophone
- Frank Marvin – vocals
- Otto Mikell – clarinet, alto saxophone
- Andy Pendleton – banjo
- Walter "Fats" Pichon – piano
- Kenneth Roane – trumpet
- Perry Smith – clarinet, tenor saxophone, vocals
- George Temple – trumpet
- Clinton Walker – tuba
- Professor Stanley Williams – alto saxophone, clarinet, vocals, leader

== Selected recordings ==
- Hot Town
- Friction
- Here 'Tis
