= Fess Williams and His Joy Boys =

- Genres: Jazz, Big band
- Years active: 1928
- Label: Vocalion

Fess Williams and His Joy Boys was a band of clarinetist Fess Williams during 1928.

== Brief history ==
During 1928 Williams took a short break from leading the Royal Flush Orchestra to front Dave Peyton's band in Chicago at the Regal Theatre under the name Fess Williams and His Joy Boys. During this time they recorded two sides on Vocalion Records, Dixie Stomp and Drifting and Dreaming. While still in Chicago he continued to play at the Savoy as the Royal Flush.

== Band members ==
- Eddie Atkins – Trombone
- Ralph Brown – Alto Saxophone
- Lawrence Dixon – Banjo, Vocals
- William Franklin – Trombone
- Clarence Lee – Violin
- Joe McCutchin – Violin
- Norvel Morton – Tenor Saxophone, Flute
- Sudie Reynaud – Bass
- Fats Robin – Trumpet
- Ruben Reeves – Trumpet
- Jasper Taylor – Drums
- Bobby Wall – Violin
- Professor Stanley Williams – Clarinet, Leader
