= Jasper Taylor =

American jazz musician

Jasper Taylor (January 1, 1894, Texarkana, Arkansas – November 7, 1964, Chicago) was an American jazz drummer.

Taylor performed in Wild West revues and minstrel shows in his teens, touring the American South and Mexico. He played in Memphis, Tennessee in 1913, on washboard, drums, wood blocks, and xylophone. As a xylophonist he collaborated with W.C. Handy, and later played with Jelly Roll Morton.

In 1917 he moved to Chicago, where he was based out of for most of his career. He played in the 365th Infantry Band in France during World War I, and played with Handy, Will Marion Cook, the Chicago Novelty Orchestra, and Clarence Williams in the late 1910s and early 1920s. Later in the 1920s he worked with Dave Peyton and Fess Williams.

Due to the downturn in opportunities to perform during the Great Depression, he quit music in the 1930s and became a cobbler. In the 1940s he returned to active performance with Freddie Shayne and others; in the 1950s he played for several years with Natty Dominique. Shortly before his death he led his own Creole Jazz Band.
