= Stump Evans =

- Birth name: Paul Anderson Evans
- Born: October 18, 1904; Lawrence, Kansas, U.S.
- Died: August 29, 1928 (aged 23); Douglas County, Kansas, U.S.
- Genres: Jazz
- Occupation: Musician
- Instrument: Saxophone
- Years active: 1920s

Paul "Stump" Evans (October 18, 1904 – August 29, 1928) was an American musician who was one of the first jazz saxophonists.

Evans experimented with several instruments: alto horn, trombone, and alto saxophone. In the 1920s, he played baritone saxophone in Chicago as a member of the Creole Jazz Band led by King Oliver and the Dixie Syncopators. He played C melody saxophone when he supported singer Priscilla Stewart. With Oliver he played soprano saxophone, then alto saxophone with the Red Hot Peppers led by Jelly Roll Morton. Evans also worked as a sideman for Erskine Tate and Jimmy Wade.

He died at the age of 23 from tuberculosis.
