= Bob Shoffner =

American jazz musician

Bob Shoffner (April 4, 1900 – March 5, 1983) was an American jazz trumpeter.

Shoffner grew up in St. Louis, Missouri, and played drums and bugle before settling on trumpet at age eleven. He played trumpet in a military band while serving in the U.S. Army from 1917-1919, and then played with Charlie Creath and Tommy Parker in territory bands. He relocated to Chicago in 1921, and played with John H. Wickcliffe, Everett Robbins, and Mae Brady. He returned to St. Louis and duty under Creath briefly before heading back to Chicago to play under Honore Dutrey and then, in 1924, to replace Louis Armstrong in King Oliver's Creole Jazzband. He played with Oliver until 1927, and spent time with Dave Peyton and Lottie Hightower during this time as well.

Shoffner suffered a lip ailment in 1927, but returned after a few months to play with Charles Elgar (1928), Erskine Tate, Jerome Carrington, McKinney's Cotton Pickers (1931), and Frankie Jaxon (1932). He moved to New York City in 1934, and played there with Fess Williams, Fletcher Henderson, and Hot Lips Page (1938). He returned once more to Chicago around 1940, and took a job working for the state; he recorded with Richard M. Jones in the middle of the 1940s, but then took a hiatus from music until 1957 to play with Franz Jackson's Original Jazz All-Stars (1957-1963). Health concerns forced him into semi-retirement after this time.

Shoffner also recorded in the 1920s with Lovie Austin, Jimmy O'Bryant, Ida Cox, and Luis Russell.
