= Red Hot Peppers (New Zealand band) =

New Zealand band formed in 1975

The Red Hot Peppers were a New Zealand band formed in 1975 by Robbie Laven. The original members were Laven (who played multiple instruments including mandolin, ang klungs, congas, alto and baritone saxophone, flute, guitar, clarinet, fiddle, Glockenspiel, zither, banjo, harmonica, dobro and penny whistle), Marion Arts (vocals), Mike Farrell (guitar), Paul Baxter (bass guitar) who was replaced by Peter Kershaw, and Jim McMillan (drums) who was replaced by Vaughan Mayberry.

== Discography ==
=== Albums ===
==== Toujours Yours (1976) ====
===== Tracklist =====
- A1 Let The Good In
- A2 Bemused
- A3 Lock And Key
- A4 If You See Her Say Hello
- A5 Preacher Woman
- B1 Toujours Yours
- B2 Dreams To Come
- B3 Cow Cow Boogie
- B4 Witchwood
- B5 Justin

===== Credits =====
- Bass – Paul Baxter
- Drums – Jim McMillan
- Flute – Robbie Laven
- Guitar – Hans Laven, Robbie Laven
- Lead Vocals – Marion Arts
- Mandolin – Robbie Laven
- Saxophone – Robbie Laven
- Violin – Robbie Laven
- Engineer – Phil Yule

==== Bright Red (1977) ====
Produced by Ian McKenzie

1. "Sing High, Sing Low" / Interlude: "Ottos Link" (by Laven and Arts)
2. "Angel" (by Laven and Arts) / Interlude: "Salterello" (anon. arr. Laven)
3. "Tears of Silver" (by Laven and Arts)
4. "Preacher Woman" (by Laven and Arts)
5. "Heebie Jeebies" (by Gorney, Gray and Stothart)
6. "You Can't Stop Bliss" / Interlude: "Abi Marijke" (by Laven and Arts)
7. "Sitting by the Road (Sighing)" (by Laven and Arts)
8. "Summer Solace: Going up the Bush" (by Laven and Arts), "I've Just Seen a Face" (by Lennon and McCartney) and "Skylark" (by Maurice and Keegan)
9. "Bright Red" (by Laven and Arts)

==== Stargazing (1978) ====
Tracklist

- A1 Stargazing
- A2 Louis
- A3 No Fancy Places
- A4 Promises For Two
- A5 L'il Black Dog
- B1 Good Luck Is Good Luck
- B2 Cocktail Affair
- B3 A Propos De Jerome
- B4 Music Man

== See also ==
Other bands with a similar name:

- Red Hot Chili Peppers
- Red Hot Peppers
- Chilli Willi and the Red Hot Peppers
