= Gatemouth =

Gatemouth is an affectionate name for one who talks too much.

Gatemouth can refer to:

- Clarence "Gatemouth" Brown U.S. R&B singer
- Arnold "Gatemouth" Moore U.S. singer
- Louis Armstrong was nicknamed "Gatemouth" early in his career
- Gatemouth (melody), a jazz tune recorded in the 1920s by the New Orleans Wanderers
