= Reuben Reeves =

American jazz trumpeter and bandleader (1905–1975)

- Born: October 25, 1905
- Died: September 1975 (aged 69)
- Genre: Jazz
- Instrument: Trumpet
- Years active: 1923–1955
- Label: Vocalion

Reuben "River" Reeves (October 25, 1905 – September 1975) was an American jazz trumpeter and bandleader.

== Career ==
Born in Evansville, Indiana, Reeves was the youngest of three brothers. He initially learned piano, encouraged by his pianist mother, but while at Frederick Douglass High School he switched to trumpet.

Reeves' professional career began in the Lexington-based Bill Smith Orchestra in summer 1923. He moved to New York City in 1924 to study dentistry, but soon dropped out to concentrate on his music career, playing in local bands with Count Basie among others, before moving to Chicago in January 1925. In 1926 he joined Erskine Tate's orchestra, then played with Fess Williams and Dave Peyton (1928–1930). While in Chicago, he took lessons from a German trumpet player, Albert Cook, who played in the Chicago Symphony. While playing at the Regal Theater in 1929, Peyton featured Reeves, his hot trumpet player, on a night where Louis Armstrong, who had a gig across the street at the Savoy, performed as a guest. The "vicious" gesture from Peyton in an attempt to intimidate Armstrong did not work as the audience begged Armstrong to play five encores. He signed to Vocalion and recorded as a bandleader with his groups the Tributaries and the River Boys; among his sidemen were his brother, trombonist Gerald Reeves, and clarinetist Omer Simeon (20 sides were recorded in 1929). He played under Cab Calloway in New York in 1931–32, and recorded again with the River Boys in 1933. He toured as a leader from 1933 to 1935, then returned to New York, playing in Dick Ward's band, and as a freelancer through the late 1930s.

Reeves joined the National Guard and played in the 369th Infantry Band. During World War II, he served in the army, and led an Army band called the Jungleers. Stationed at the Army Jungle Training Center on the northeast coast of Oahu, they were popular participants in Battle of the Band competitions that were an integral part of the "extraordinary music scene in Hawaii during the war." After the war, he worked in a Post Office and went on to join Harry Dial's Blusicians in 1946. He worked as a guard for the Chemical Bank New York Trust Company from 1952, and in 1955 gave up music.

Reuben Reeves died in September 1975.

Reeves' entire output as a bandleader has been released to a single compact disc by RST Records.
