= Mister Jelly Roll =

1950 book

Mister Jelly Roll is a 1950 book by Alan Lomax based largely on the author's 1938 interview with Jelly Roll Morton. The interview was recorded at the Library of Congress and released on its own, including in 2005 as the box set Jelly Roll Morton: The Complete Library of Congress Recordings. According to the author, it may have been "the first recorded biography to be made into a book."

== Synopsis ==
The book has five parts. Most of the text is in the first person, the result of Lomax edting Morton's "surge of speech into the quieter flow of type." The first, second, and fourth parts conclude with an "interlude," in which Lomax reports on his interviews with Morton's contemporaries that deepen the story and situate Jelly Roll's place in the early history of jazz.

PART ONE: LOUISIANA TOWN

Chapter titles: My Folks Was All Frenchmans, Really Tremendous Sports, Money in the Tenderloin, Interlude—The Family.

Morton (born Ferdinand Joseph LaMothe) describes his early childhood in New Orleans in a series of episodes, many with a tone of exaggeration or drama. For instance, he reports being put in jail at the age of 6 months. Music, of course, is another constant. He learned several instruments at a young age. At first he avoided the instrument that he would later be known for. "The piano was known in our circle as an instrument for a lady."

Morton got his first job around the age of 14 as a "regular professor," a piano player in a district of clubs and brothels. When his grandmother found out, she told him to move out of the family home and stay away from his sisters. In his interlude chapter, Lomax traces Morton's "epic self-praise" back to the shame and sorrow of childhood moments like this one.

PART TWO: STORYVILLE

Chapter titles: Where the Birth of Jazz Originated from; Uptown—Downtown; Sweet, Soft, Plenty Rhythm, Interlude—The Boys in the Bands.

The first two chapters of Part Two detail some of Morton's early performance jobs in the brothels and gambling houses of Storyville, New Orleans. He mentions several musicians he played with or admired, including Tony Jackson and Buddy Bolden. In the third chapter he explains his theory of jazz, including tempo, riffs, breaks, and borrowing from multiple musical traditions. "There is nothing finer than jazz music because it comes from everything of the finest class music."

The long chapter "Interlude—The Boys in the Bands" reports on Lomax's interviews with Morton contemporaries and the author's analysis of Morton's place in jazz history. Morton claimed that "I personally originated jazz in New Orleans in 1902," and Lomax writes that

The facts justify Morton to some extent... [H]e was the first true composer of jazz, not only an original, competent and prolific creator, but an aggressive organizer and self-advertiser.

PART THREE: ALABAMA BOUND

Chapter titles: Half-hand Bigshot, Those Battles of Music, The Lion Broke Down the Door, Jack the Bear, Can't Remember All Those Towns, Jelly Roll Blues.

Morton describes traveling and performing in Mississippi, Alabama, and Tennessee, then later in St. Louis and Chicago. In addition to piano playing, he was also at times a pool shark and a gambler. He also reports getting sent to a work camp for hopping a train, then escaping before his 100-day sentence was up. He travels to Memphis and out-plays the purported best piano player in Tennessee ("After that, Beale Street belonged to me"), and in 1908 meets W.C. Handy, whom Morton calls overrated.

In the chapter "Can't Remember All Those Towns," Morton travels extensively with a band and as a straight man to comedian Sandy Burns. It was on stage with Burns that, while improvising, Morton gave himself the name Jelly Roll.

PART FOUR: I TOOK CALIFORNIA

Chapter titles: The Cadillac in Bloom, Diamonds Pinned to My Underwear, Mama Nita, Interlude—Hello, Central, Give Me Doctor Jazz.

This part mostly describes Morton's travels, gambling, and business dealings in California— and, briefly, Seattle and Alaska—between 1917 and 1922. He says little about performance and more about personal grudges and conflicts. The chapter "Mama Nita" is a brief perspective from his longtime companion, Anita Gonzalez, told in the third person and evidently based on an interview with Lomax. The couple split up in 1923, when Morton moved to Chicago.

Lomax's interlude puts Morton's Chicago period into the context of jazz history. A key development was Morton's relationship with the Melrose brothers—publisher Walter Melrose and record producer Lester Melrose. Morton, characteristically, claims credit for the Melrose brothers' success, whereas Walter Melrose sees it the other way around. Lomax sees it, more broadly, as "the first step in the ultimate big corporate control and exploitation of jazz." On the plus side, it was during these years, Lomax writes, that "Jelly Roll Morton and His Red Hot Peppers produced the finest recordings of New Orleans music ever made."

PART FIVE: THE BITTERS WITH THE SWEET

Chapter titles: Mabel, Red Hot Pepper, It Like to Broke My Heart, Till the Butcher Cut Him Down.

Lomax interviewed Morton for about a month in 1938, but they did not cover the depression years in detail. So this final part shifts from Lomax's voice to Morton's to that of Morton's wife, Mabel Bertrand, and concludes with letters Morton wrote to Mabel in his final months, November 1940 to April 1941. As in the rest of the book, the focus goes back and forth from Morton's achievements and disappointments on the one hand, to historical context from Lomax. Morton himself says little about that context. Lomax comments, not without sympathy: "Mister Jelly Roll was the kind of American who refused to recognize the Depression, just as he was the kind of Negro who refused to recognize racial discrimination."

END MATTER

The book has two appendixes—"The Tunes" and "The Records"—which catalogue part of Morton's legacy.

== Reception ==
In the New York Times, Louis Armstrong called the book "one of the finest stories ever written on early New Orleans Jazz."

The New Yorker called Morton's storytelling "a masterpiece of American social and musical history." It credited Lomax for his insight but faulted him for "a style apparently modelled after a laundry list" and "gaudy bad taste."

Time called the book "the full-flavored story of a raucous, diamond-studded era of U.S. history."

The book has four editions: 1950, 1973, 1993, 2001.
