= Nat Hentoff =

American music critic and author (1925–2017)

- Hentoff in 2004
- Born: Nathan Irving Hentoff; June 10, 1925; Boston, Massachusetts, U.S.
- Died: January 7, 2017 (aged 91); New York City, U.S.
- Education: Northeastern University; Harvard University; Sorbonne University
- Occupations: Columnist; historian; novelist; music critic
- Spouses: Miriam Sargent (m. 1950; div. 1950); Trudi Bernstein (m. 1954; div. 1959); Margot Goodman (m. 1959)
- Children: 4

Nathan Irving Hentoff (June 10, 1925 – January 7, 2017) was an American historian, novelist, jazz and country music critic, and syndicated columnist for United Media. Hentoff was a columnist for The Village Voice from 1958 to 2009. Following his departure from The Voice, Hentoff became a senior fellow at the Cato Institute and continued writing his music column for The Wall Street Journal, which published his works until his death. He often wrote on First Amendment issues, vigorously defending the freedom of the press.

Hentoff was formerly a columnist for: Down Beat, JazzTimes, Legal Times, The Washington Post, The Washington Times, The Progressive, Editor & Publisher and Free Inquiry. He was a staff writer for The New Yorker, and his writings were also published in The New York Times, Jewish World Review, The Atlantic, The New Republic, Commonweal, and Enciclopedia dello Spettacolo.

== Early life and education ==
Hentoff was born on June 10, 1925, in Boston, Massachusetts, the firstborn child of Simon, a traveling salesman, and Lena (née Katzenberg). His parents were Jewish Russian immigrants. As a teen, Hentoff attended Boston Latin School and worked for Frances Sweeney on the Boston City Reporter, investigating antisemitic hate groups. Sweeney was a major influence on Hentoff; his memoir, Boston Boy, is dedicated to her. He played soprano saxophone and clarinet as a youth, and became interested in jazz after listening to Artie Shaw play. He received his Bachelor of Arts degree with highest honors, in 1946 from Northeastern University. That same year he enrolled for graduate study at Harvard University. In 1950, he attended Sorbonne University in Paris, France, on a Fulbright Scholarship.

== Career ==
Hentoff began his career in broadcast journalism while hosting a weekly jazz program on Boston radio station WMEX. In the 1940s, he hosted two radio shows on WMEX: JazzAlbum and From Bach to Bartók. In the early 1950s he continued to present a jazz program on WMEX, and as a Staff Announcer for WMEX, he regularly hosted remote broadcasts from the Savoy, and Storyville, two Boston clubs run by George Wein, and during that period was an announcer on the program Evolution of Jazz on WGBH-FM. In 2013, the Evolution of Jazz series was contributed to the American Archive of Public Broadcasting by the University of Maryland's National Public Broadcasting Archives as part of the National Association of Educational Broadcasters (NAEB) collection.

By the late 1950s, he was co-hosting the program The Scope of Jazz on WBAI-FM in New York City. He went on to write many books on jazz and politics.

In 1952, Hentoff joined Down Beat magazine as a columnist. The following year, he moved to New York to become the Chicago-based magazine's New York editor. He was fired in 1957, he alleged, because he attempted to hire an African-American writer.

Hentoff co-wrote Hear Me Talkin' to Ya: The Story of Jazz by the Men Who Made It (1955) with Nat Shapiro. The book includes interviews with jazz musicians such as Dizzy Gillespie and Duke Ellington. Hentoff co-founded The Jazz Review in 1958, a magazine that he co-edited with Martin Williams until 1961. In 1960 he served as artists and repertoire (A&R) director for the short-lived jazz label Candid Records, which released albums by Charles Mingus, Cecil Taylor, and Max Roach.

Around the same time, Hentoff began freelance writing for Esquire, Playboy, Harper's, New York Herald Tribune, Commonweal, and The Reporter. From 1958 to 2009, he wrote weekly columns on education, civil liberties, politics, and capital punishment for The Village Voice. He also wrote for The New Yorker (1960–1986), The Washington Post (1984–2000), and The Washington Times. He worked with the Jazz Foundation of America to help American jazz and blues musicians in need. He wrote many articles for The Wall Street Journal and The Village Voice to draw attention to the plight of America's pioneering jazz and blues musicians.

Hentoff also wrote many novels for young adults, including I'm Really Dragged But Nothing Gets Me Down (1968), This School is Driving Me Crazy (1976), Blues for Charlie Darwin (1982), and The Day They Came To Arrest The Book (1983). Writing about the latter for The Washington Post, Alyssa Rosenberg commented that "One of the useful — or depressing — things about reading Hentoff’s YA polemic, which was published all the way back in 1982, is how similar the novel’s conflicts are to our present debates."

Beginning in February 2008, Hentoff was a weekly contributing columnist at WorldNetDaily. In January 2009, The Village Voice, which had published his commentary and criticism for fifty years, announced that he had been laid off. He then went on to write for United Features, Jewish World Review, and The Wall Street Journal. He joined the Cato Institute, a libertarian think tank, as a senior fellow in February 2009.

In 2013, The Pleasures of Being Out of Step, a biographical film about Hentoff, explored his career in jazz and as a First Amendment advocate. The independent documentary, produced and directed by David L. Lewis, won the Grand Jury prize in the Metropolis competition at the DOC NYC festival and played in theaters across the country.

== Political views, commentary, and activism ==
Hentoff espoused generally liberal views on domestic policy and civil liberties, but in the 1980s, he began articulating more socially conservative positions especially in regard to medical ethics and reproductive rights. He was opposed to abortion, voluntary euthanasia, and the selective medical treatment of severely disabled infants. He believed that a consistent life ethic should be the viewpoint of a genuine civil libertarian, arguing that all human rights are at risk when the rights of one group of people are diminished, that human rights are interconnected, and that people deny others' human rights at their peril.

=== Antisemitism ===
Hentoff believed antisemitism was rampant.

=== Social and individual freedom ===
Hentoff was a civil libertarian and free speech activist who opposed abortion and capital punishment. The American Conservative magazine called him "the only Jewish, atheist, pro-life, libertarian hawk in America."

Although he supported the American Civil Liberties Union for many years, he criticized the organization in 1999 for defending government-enforced speech codes in universities and the workplace. He served on the board of advisors for the Foundation for Individual Rights in Education, another civil liberties group. His book Free Speech for Me—But Not for Thee outlined his views on free speech and criticized those who favored censorship "in any form."

=== Vietnam ===
Hentoff agitated against the Vietnam War and against the United States' participation. Although he said he was a "hardcore anti-communist" since the age of 15, he had "no illusions about the corrupt, undemocratic government of South Vietnam." After the war's end, Hentoff, Joan Baez, and Ginetta Sagan of Amnesty International repeatedly protested what he called "the horrifying abuses of human rights [committed] by the Vietnamese Communist regime."

=== Middle East ===
Hentoff defended the existence of the state of Israel. He criticized Israeli policies such as the absence of due process for Palestinians and the 1982 invasion of Lebanon. His opposition to Israel's invasion of Lebanon led three rabbis symbolically to "excommunicate" him from Judaism. He commented, "I would have told them about my life as a heretic, a tradition I keep precisely because I am a Jew." He supported the 2003 invasion of Iraq.

=== War on terror ===
Hentoff criticized the Clinton administration for the Antiterrorism and Effective Death Penalty Act of 1996. He also criticized the Bush administration for "authoritarian" policies such as the Patriot Act and other civil liberties restrictions legislated through invoking the ostensible need for homeland security.

An ardent critic of the G. W. Bush administration's expansion of presidential power, in 2008 Hentoff called for the new president to deal with the "noxious residue of the Bush-Cheney war against terrorism". According to Hentoff, among the casualties of that war have been "survivors, if they can be found, of CIA secret prisons ('black sites'), victims of CIA kidnapping renditions, and American citizens locked up indefinitely as 'unlawful enemy combatants'". He wanted lawyer John Yoo to be prosecuted for war crimes.

=== Presidential politics ===
Hentoff stated that while he had been prepared to support Barack Obama enthusiastically in the 2008 U.S. presidential election, his view changed after looking into Obama's voting record on abortion. During President Obama's first year, Hentoff praised him for ending policies of CIA renditions, but criticized him for failing to end George W. Bush's practice of "state torture" of prisoners.

== Awards and honors ==
Hentoff was named a Guggenheim Fellow in 1972. He won the American Bar Association's Silver Gavel Award in 1980 for his columns on law and criminal justice. In 1983, he was awarded the American Library Association's Imroth Award for Intellectual Freedom. In 1985, he received an honorary Doctorate of Laws from the Northeastern University. In 1995, he was honored with the National Press Foundation's Award in recognition of his lifetime distinguished contributions to journalism. In 2004, Hentoff was named one of six NEA Jazz Masters by the U.S. National Endowment for the Arts, thus becoming the first nonmusician in history to win this award. That same year, the Boston Latin School honored him as alumnus of the year. In 2005, he was one of the first recipients of the Human Life Foundation's "Great Defender of Life" award.

== Personal life ==
Hentoff grew up attending an Orthodox synagogue in Boston. He recalled that as a youth, he would travel around the city with his father during the High Holidays to listen to various cantors and compare notes on their performances. He said cantors made "sacred texts compellingly clear to the heart," and he collected their recordings. In later life, Hentoff was an atheist, and sardonically described himself as "a member of the Proud and Ancient Order of Stiff-Necked Jewish Atheists". He expressed sympathy for Israel's Peace Now movement.

Hentoff married three times, first to Miriam Sargent in 1950; the marriage was childless and the couple divorced that same year. His second wife was Trudi Bernstein, whom he married on September 2, 1954, and with whom he had two children, Miranda and Jessica. (Jessica Hentoff is the founder of Circus Harmony, a non-profit social circus and circus school in St. Louis, Missouri.) He divorced his second wife in August 1959. On August 15, 1959, he married his third wife, Margot Goodman, with whom he had two children: Nicholas and Thomas. The couple remained together until he died of natural causes at his Manhattan apartment on January 7, 2017, aged 91.

== Bibliography ==
=== Books ===
Non-fiction

- Hear Me Talkin' to Ya: The Story of Jazz as Told by the Men who Made it, with Nat Shapiro. ISBN 978-0-486-21726-0 (1955)
- The Jazz Makers, with Nat Shapiro. ISBN 0-8371-7098-2 (1957)
- The Jazz Life. ISBN 0-306-80088-8 (1961)
- Peace Agitator: The Story of A. J. Muste. ISBN 0-9608096-0-0 (1963)
- The New Equality. ISBN 978-0-670-00185-9 (1964)
- Our Children Are Dying (with John Holt). ISBN 978-0-939266-43-2 (1967)
- A Doctor Among the Addicts: The Story of Marie Nyswander. ISBN 978-0-528-81946-9 (1968)
- Baldwin, James; Nat, Hentoff (1969). Black anti-Semitism and Jewish racism (reprint ed.). R. W. Baron.
- A Political Life: The Education of John V. Lindsay (1969)
- Journey into Jazz. ISBN 978-0-698-30206-8 (1971)
- Hentoff, Nat; McCarthy, Albert J. (1975). Jazz: New Perspectives on the History of Jazz by Twelve of the World's Foremost Jazz Critics and Scholars (illustrated, reprint ed.). Perseus Books Group. ISBN 978-0-306-80002-3.
- Jazz Is. ISBN 978-0-7567-5045-9 (1976)
- Does Anybody Give a Damn?: Nat Hentoff on Education. ISBN 978-0-394-40933-7 (Random House; 1977)
- The First Freedom: The Tumultuous History of Free Speech in America. ISBN 978-0-385-29643-4 (1980)
- Hentoff, Nat (1987). American Heroes: In and Out of School. Delacorte Press. ISBN 978-0-385-29565-9.
- John Cardinal O'Connor: At the Storm Center of a Changing American Catholic Church. ISBN 0-684-18944-5 (1988)
- Free Speech for Me—But Not for Thee: How the American Left and Right Relentlessly Censor Each Other. ISBN 0-06-099510-6 (1993)
- Listen to the Stories: Nat Hentoff on Jazz and Country Music. ISBN 0-06-019047-7 (1995)
- Living the Bill of Rights: How to Be an Authentic American. ISBN 0-520-21981-3 (1999)
- Hentoff, Nat (2001). The Nat Hentoff Reader. Da Capo Press. ISBN 978-0-306-81084-8.
- Hentoff, Nat (2004). The War on the Bill of Rights and the Gathering Resistance (illustrated, reprint ed.). Seven Stories Press. ISBN 978-1-58322-658-2.
- Hentoff, Nat (2004). American Music is (reprint ed.). Da Capo Press. ISBN 978-0-306-81351-1.

Memoirs

External videos
- Booknotes interview with Hentoff on Speaking Freely, October 19, 1997, C-SPAN

- Boston Boy: Growing Up With Jazz and Other Rebellious Passions. ISBN 0-9679675-2-X (1986)
- Speaking Freely: A Memoir. ISBN 978-0-679-43647-8 (1997)
- Hentoff, Nat (2010). At the Jazz Band Ball: Sixty Years on the Jazz Scene. University of California Press. ISBN 9780520945883.

Novels

- Jazz Country. ISBN 978-0-440-94203-0 (1965)
- Call the Keeper. ISBN 978-0-670-20014-6 (1966)
- Hentoff, Nat (1968). Onwards!: a novel. Simon and Schuster.
- Hentoff, Nat (1968). I'm really dragged but nothing gets me down. Simon & Schuster.
- In the Country of Ourselves (1971)
- This School Is Driving Me Crazy. ISBN 978-0-440-98702-4 (1976)
- Does This School Have Capital Punishment? ISBN 0-435-12329-7 (1982)
- Blues for Charlie Darwin. ISBN 978-0-68801-260-1 (1982)
- The Day They Came to Arrest the Book. ISBN 978-0-440-91814-1 (1983)
- The Man from Internal Affairs. ISBN 978-0-89296-141-2 (1985)

=== Essays, reporting and other contributions ===
- Hentoff, Nat (August 29, 2022). "Crackin', shakin', breakin' sounds : how the young Bob Dylan transcended 'finger-pointing' folk songs and found a new, incisive voice". Profiles. October 24, 1964. The New Yorker. 98 (26): 48–55. (Note: Originally published in the October 24, 1964 issue.) (Note: Online version is titled "What Bob Dylan wanted at twenty-three".)

———————

Bibliography notes
