= Jelly Roll Blues =

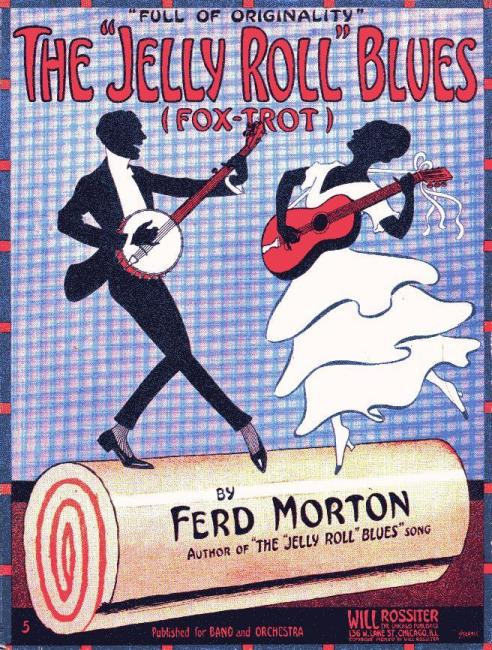
- Sheet music cover

Song by Jelly Roll Morton
- Published: 1915
- Genre: Jazz
- Label: Gennett, Bluebird, Victor
- Composer: Ferd "Jelly Roll" Morton

"Original Jelly Roll Blues", usually shortened to and known as "Jelly Roll Blues", is an early jazz fox-trot composed by Jelly Roll Morton. He recorded it first as a piano solo in Richmond, Indiana, in 1924, and then with his Red Hot Peppers in Chicago two years later, titled as it was originally copyrighted: "Original Jelly-Roll Blues". It is referenced by name in the 1917 Shelton Brooks composition "Darktown Strutters' Ball".

The Red Hot Peppers version is a typical New Orleans jazz presentation where the trumpet, clarinet and trombone play lead melody and counterpoint, with the piano, guitar, string bass and drums providing the rhythmic accompaniment. However, Morton varies and enriches this basic structure by providing many instrumental breaks in suspended rhythm, as well as giving the horns and the piano solo passages. The final chorus is in New Orleans "ride-out" style, where all the instruments play together and vary the melody and chord progression in counterpoint over a driving, climactic rhythm. The tune is also notable for having an Argentine tango-like rhythm and flavor in several passages, which Morton claimed was essential to real jazz. Although this tango flavoring did not survive into later jazz, it is noteworthy in the mixture of international cultural influences that produced New Orleans jazz, and this recording is a prime example of it. In this record and several other Morton recordings of 1926–27, the New Orleans early jazz style, as a collective blend of instruments varying the basic melody by means of both composed, written notes and improvisation, reached its peak of artistic development.
