= Hot Town =

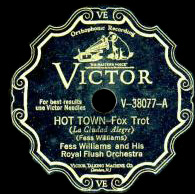
Hot Town by Fess Williams

Hot Town is a song both composed and recorded by Fess Williams and his Royal Flush Orchestra. It was first recorded on 17 April 1929 in New York City and released on both the Victor and Bluebird labels.

It was the best selling record for Fess Williams throughout his entire career, which spanned over several decades.
