= The Jazz Review =

Jazz criticism magazine

- Co-editors: Nat Hentoff & Martin Williams
- Categories: Music magazine
- Frequency: Monthly
- Publisher: Leonard Feldman, Israel Young
- Founder: Nat Hentoff, Martin Williams, Hsio Wen Shih
- Founded: 1958
- First issue: Nov. 1958
- Final issue: Jan. 1961
- Company: The Jazz Review, Inc.
- Country: U.S.A.
- Based in: New York City
- Language: English

The Jazz Review was a jazz criticism magazine founded by Nat Hentoff and Martin Williams in New York City in 1958. It was published till 1961. Hentoff and Williams were co-editors throughout its brief existence (23 issues).

Many issues of The Jazz Review are available at Jazz Studies Online, which assesses its quality as follows:

While all of the material is of high quality, several features are particularly distinctive: the regular reviews of musicians' work by other musicians; Hentoff's regular column "Jazz in Print", which deals with the politics of the music business as well as of the nation; and the incorporation of a wide range of musical styles and approaches to discussing jazz.

A regular feature of The Jazz Review was "The Blues," a page of transcriptions of the lyrics from blues recordings by a variety of singers, e.g., in the seventh issue:

- "Crying Mother Blues," Red Nelson
- "Six Cold Feet in the Ground," Leroy Carr
- "Patrol Wagon Blues," Henry Allen

== Contributors ==
In addition to the magazine's founders, the following writers contributed articles to The Jazz Review:

- Joachim Berendt
- Stanley Dance
- André Hodeir
- LeRoi Jones
- Orrin Keepnews
- Mimi Melnick
- Paul Oliver
- Harvey Pekar
- Ross Russell
- William Russo
- Gunther Schuller
- Hsio Wen Shih
- Studs Terkel

== Later incarnation ==
A later California-based magazine also titled The Jazz Review, edited by Ken Borgers and Bill Wasserzieher, appeared in 1991–1992, with cover stories on Dizzy Gillespie, Miles Davis, Charlie Haden, and other artists.
