= Preston Jackson =

American jazz trombonist (1902–1983)

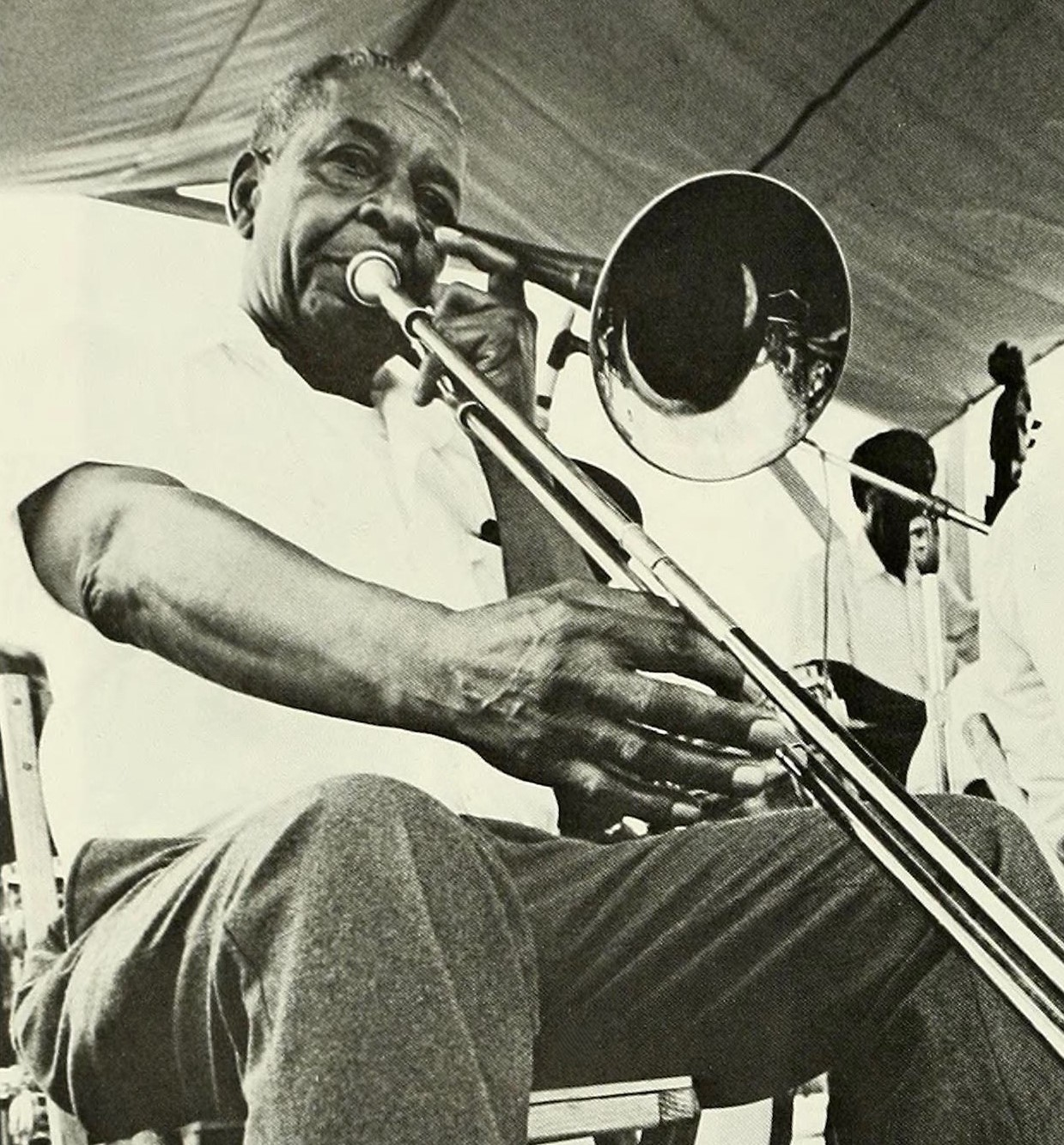
- Jackson in 1975

Background information
- Born: James Preston McDonald; January 3, 1902; New Orleans, Louisiana, US
- Died: November 12, 1983 (aged 81) Blytheville, Arkansas, US
- Genre: Jazz
- Occupation: Musician
- Instrument: Trombone

James Preston McDonald (January 3, 1902 – November 12, 1983), known by his stage name Preston Jackson, was an American jazz trombonist.

== Biography ==
Jackson was born on January 3, 1902, in New Orleans. In 1917, he moved to Chicago. He began playing trombone in 1920, and within nine months he began playing professionally. Among his teachers in the early 1920s were Roy Palmer and Honore Dutrey. He sometimes deputized for Dutrey in King Oliver's band. In the 1920s, he played with Tig Chambers, Al Simone, Eli Rice, and Art Sims, and recorded with Bernie Young and his Creole Jazz Band at the Marsh Laboratories (1923) and Richard M. Jones. He notably played for the reception of Louis Armstrong and Lil Hardin Armstrong in Chicago.

In the 1930s, Jackson played with Dave Peyton (1930), Erskine Tate, Louis Armstrong (1931–32), Half Pint Jaxon (1933), Carroll Dickerson, Jimmie Noone, Roy Eldridge, Walter Barnes, Johnny Long (1939), and Zilner Randolph's W.P.A. Band. He also played on Johnny Dodds's last recordings in 1940.

In the 1940s, Jackson began playing less often, but his career saw a resurgence late in the 1950s, playing with Lil Armstrong.

Moving back to his childhood home of New Orleans in the 1960s, Jackson began playing at Preservation Hall where he would continue to be featured for the rest of his life. He played with Little Brother Montgomery in 1969 and with Kid Thomas's New Orleans Joymakers in Europe in 1973 and 1974.

In addition to many recordings made as a side man, Jackson recorded as a leader in 1926 and 1946, then issued his own album in 1972 and a split album with Benny Waters the following year.

Jackson died on November 12, 1983, aged 81, in Blytheville, Arkansas.
