= Mimi Clar Melnick =

American journalist, author and jazz hostess (1935-2013)

- Born: Miriam Clar; December 25, 1935; Hollywood, California, U.S.
- Died: June 14, 2013 (aged 77); Los Angeles, California, U.S.
- Occupation: Journalist
- Spouse: Robert Melnick

Mimi Clar Melnick (December 25, 1935 – June 14, 2013) was a journalist, author, and jazz salon hostess in Los Angeles.

== Early life and education ==
Mimi Melnick was born Miriam Clar in Hollywood, California on December 25, 1935. Her father, Charles Clar, was a high-end fireplace merchant, and her mother, Reva Howitt, was a dancer. Her family was Jewish. She studied classical piano as a child and graduated from John Marshall High School in 1953. Melnick went on to attend UCLA, graduating in 1960 with a music degree.

== Career ==
Beginning in 1958, Melnick worked as a music critic for the Los Angeles Times, ending her tenure there in 1965 after writing over 200 articles, mostly about jazz musicians and concerts but also covering classical music and theatre events. In addition, she wrote articles for a variety of other publications including Vogue, Life, Harper's, Folklore International, Jazz Review, California Historical Quarterly, and over 70 articles in the journal Western Folklore.

After her career as a music journalist, Melnick developed an interest in other areas as well. She co-wrote two books (and a scholarly article in California Historical Quarterly) on manhole covers as historical artifacts and urban art with her husband, Robert Melnick. Her research and advocacy resulted in the city of Los Angeles officially preserving fifteen manhole covers in 1984 at Heritage Square historic park. She also contributed to, edited, and published her mother's autobiography on her life as a vaudeville dancer.

Melnick began to host jazz salons (known as the Double M Jazz Salon) in the living room of her Encino home in 1996, attracting dozens of talented musicians (such as Horace Tapscott, Bobby Bradford, and Gerald Wiggins) as well as hundreds of jazz fans including Morgan Freeman, Marla Gibbs, Amber Tamblyn, and Russ Tamblyn. Her mailing list of invitees grew to 500, and average attendance at the salons was about 70.

== Personal ==
Melnick died on June 14, 2013, due to complications from open heart surgery. Her husband, engineer and photographer Robert Melnick, died in 1982.

== Selected publications ==
Along with hundreds of scholarly journal articles, newspaper articles, book chapters, and magazine articles, Melnick wrote or contributed to the following monographs:

- Lollipop: Vaudeville Turns with a Fanchon and Marco Dancer (Lanham, MD: Scarecrow Press, 2002). (Contributor and editor)
- Manhole Covers of Los Angeles (Los Angeles : Dawson's Book Shop, 1974). (co-written with Robert Melnick)
- Manhole Covers (Cambridge, MA: MIT Press, 1994). (co-written with Robert Melnick)

== Legacy ==
Melnick's archives are held in the University Library at California State University, Northridge. The Double M Jazz Salon lived on even after her death, as jazz concerts and music scholarships were sponsored by her brother Richard Clar and held at the Mayme A. Clayton Library and Museum in Culver City, California for several years.
