= Black Bottom Stomp =

1925 song composed by Jelly Roll Morton

Song by Red Hot Peppers
- Published: 1925
- Genre: Jazz
- Composer: Jelly Roll Morton

"Black Bottom Stomp" is a jazz composition. It was composed by Jelly Roll Morton in 1925. It was recorded in Chicago by Morton and His Red Hot Peppers, for Victor Records on September 15, 1926.

== Technique ==
The recording has many features that are typical of the New Orleans style:

- the frontline of trumpet, clarinet and trombone and rhythm section comprising piano, banjo, double bass and drum kit
- the structure, derived from multi-thematic ragtime structures, with a transitional interlude leading to a new key
- collective improvisation ensemble sections, the main melody woven together with a counter-melody and the accompaniment
- the counter-melody relies upon scalar patterns and arpeggios
- the instrumental performance techniques such as the trombone counter-melody glissandos, sometimes known as "tailgating"
- the percussive "slapped" bass used to help keep time in the rhythm section.

== Structure ==
John Szwed notes that in "Black Bottom Stomp", "Morton practiced what he preached, managing to incorporate in one short piece the 'Spanish tinge,' stomps, breaks, stoptime, backbeat, two-beat, four-beat, a complete suspension of the rhythm section during the piano solo, riffs, rich variations of melody, and dynamics of volume, all of the elements of jazz as he understood it."

1. Intro: B♭ major, 8 bars, full ensemble
2. A section in B♭. Three 16 bar choruses: (i) full ensemble; (ii) trumpet calls with ensemble response; (iii) clarinet solo
3. Interlude: 4 bars, for full ensemble
4. B section in E♭: Seven 20 bar choruses: (i) Full ensemble with trumpet and trombone break; (ii) clarinet solo (iii) piano solo; (iv) trumpet solo stop-time chorus; (v) banjo solo; (vi) full ensemble with drum break; (vii) full ensemble with trombone break
5. Coda in E♭ for full ensemble

The harmonic basis is relatively simple, using standard II - V - I progressions. During the A section chorus, the chord progression passes through the relative minor.

With only seven instruments in the ensemble, Morton produces five distinct textures:

1. trumpet and rhythm section
2. clarinet
3. banjo and rhythm section
4. clarinet and rhythm section
5. piano solo

The piece displays traits of Morton's compositional style:

- built-in breaks
- stop-time phrases
- rhythmically lively themes
- frequent contrasts of sustained semibreve phrases with syncopated semibreve patterns
- a stomping "trio" section

Some distinct rhythmic features of New Orleans jazz appear throughout:

- 2-beat mixed with 4-beat time
- stop-time
- Charleston rhythm

== Performers ==
The performers on the original recording were:

- Clarinet: Omer Simeon
- Trumpet: George Mitchell
- Trombone: Kid Ory
- Piano: Jelly Roll Morton
- Banjo: Johnny St. Cyr
- Double Bass: John Lindsay
- Drums: Andrew Hilaire

== See also ==
- Black Bottom (disambiguation)

== Sources ==
- Burton W. Peretti (2006), "“Black Bottom Stomp”--Jelly Roll Morton’s Red Hot Peppers (1926)" Library of Congress Registry of Recorded Sound.
