= Everett Robbins =

American pianist, bandleader and composer (1899–1926)

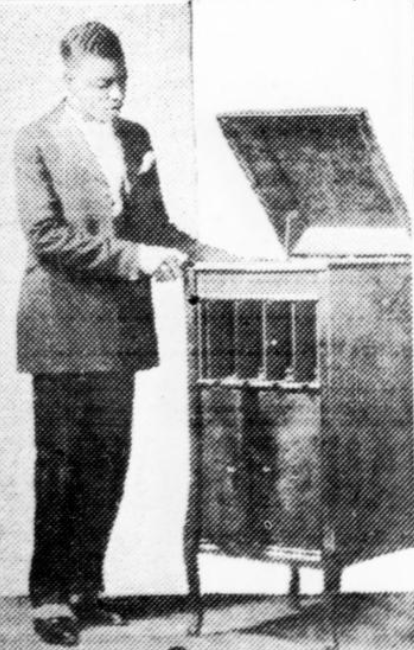
- Robbins, with a record player, from a 1924 publication

Background information
- Born: Everett Robbins; 1899
- Origin: Muskogee, Oklahoma, U.S.
- Died: April 16, 1926 (aged 26–27)
- Genres: Jazz; Blues
- Occupations: Pianist, bandleader, composer
- Instrument: Piano

Everett "Happy" Robbins (1899 – April 16, 1926) was a Chicago-based pianist, bandleader and composer.

Born in Muskogee, Oklahoma in 1899, he moved to Chicago in 1916 and studied at the American Conservatory of Music. He started his musician career in 1919 as a pianist for James Like's orchestra.

Lineups of his bands in the 1920s, such as Everett and his Syncopated Robins, included Eddie Vincent, Benney Fields, Jimmy Dudley, William Hoy, and Henry Johnson, while Everett Robbins' Jazz Screamers included Bob Shoffner.

As well as leading his own bands, he also recorded, as a pianist, in 1922, with Mamie Smith's Jazz Hounds, coinciding with Garvin Bushell, Coleman Hawkins, Bubber Miley and Herb Flemming.

Robbins made piano rolls for the Capitol Roll & Record Company and is possibly most known for "Ain't Nobody's Business", a song he co-wrote with Porter Grainger in 1922. Both pianists played in Mamie Smith's Jazz Hounds around the same time, but as they played the same instrument, they are unlikely to have coincided.

He died in April 16, 1926, following a year of illness, when he was only 27 years old.

== Discography ==
=== As leader/co-leader ===
- 1923: "Hard Luck Blues"
- 1991: Boogie Woogie Blues
- 2001: Jazz & Blues Piano, Vol. 2: 1924-1947

=== As sideman ===
- 1922: with Mamie Smith's Jazz Hounds
