= Black Bottom =

Black Bottom may refer to:

== Places ==
- Black Bottom, Alabama, an unincorporated community in Cullman County, Alabama
- Black Bottom, Detroit, former neighborhood in Detroit, Michigan
- Black Bottom, Kentucky, an unincorporated community in Harlan County, Kentucky
- Black Bottom Historic District, a historic district in Russellville, Logan County, Kentucky
- Black Bottom, Philadelphia, a former neighborhood of mostly African Americans that was razed

== Other ==
- Black Bottom (dance)
- "Black Bottom", 1982 single by The Troggs

== See also ==
- "Black Bottom Stomp", jazz composition
- Black bottom pie, pie with a layer of chocolate pastry cream or pudding
