= Bill Wasserzieher =

American writer

Bill Wasserzieher is an American writer who focuses on music, film, and travel topics. He also writes fiction.

== History ==
His earliest articles appeared during the late 1960s and early 1970s in the then Knight-Ridder-owned Independent and Press-Telegram morning and afternoon newspapers, serving the greater Los Angeles region. A shift in coasts to New York led to editorial positions at the Village Voice. In subsequent years, Wasserzieher has written about bands and individual musicians for ICE magazine, where he had a monthly music column from 1997 to 2006, as well as the Village Voice, the OC Weekly, L.A. View, Crawdaddy, Yahoo Music, Living Blues, Southland Blues, Rock & Roll Disc, The Jazz Review, L.A. Free Press, Blues Revue and its spin-off Blues Music where he is now a contributing editor.

In addition, his liner-notes essays have appeared on albums by Lightnin' Hopkins, Memphis Slim, Bert Jansch, Robert Lockwood, Jr., Chris Smither, Ted Hawkins, the Fabulous Thunderbirds, Doug MacLeod, Mighty Sam McClain and others. A sampling of his many articles can be found at the Rock's Back Pages website. Wasserzieher's film-related work includes numerous reviews as the DVD editor for Ugly Things magazine. He also appears as an on-camera commentator for a 40-minute bonus feature interview with Peter di Donato accompanying the restored 1950 film Christ in Concrete, directed by Hollywood 10 blacklist director Edward Dmytryk.

He has written about air travel for Smithsonian Air & Space, Boeing Frontiers, AirTran Arrivals and similar publications. He is the author of a book on the pioneering Douglas Aircraft Company entitled Douglas: The Santa Monica Years. His published fiction includes "Mad Dog in the Slot," which appears in the Saturday Evening Post magazine's Best Short Stories of 2014 volume, "Down to Guaymas" in The Cost of Paper, Vol. 3 and "White Nights" in Chance Encounters.
