= Our Children Are Dying =

1968 book by Nat Hentoff

- Title page for Our Children Are Dying (1966)
- Author: Nat Hentoff
- Subject: Education in New York City, education and race
- Published: 1966 (Viking Press)
- Pages: 141
- OCLC: 177946
- LC Class: LB880 H45

Our Children Are Dying is a book-length extended portrait of Elliott Shapiro, the experimental principal of P.S. 119 in Harlem, New York, written by Nat Hentoff and published by Viking Press in 1966.
