= Erskine Tate =

American jazz violinist and bandleader (1895–1978)

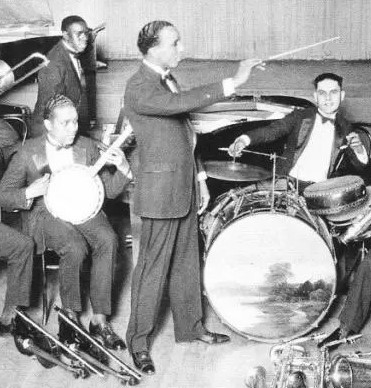
- Erskine Tate and the Vendome Theater Orchestra in 1925

Background information
- Born: January 14 1895; Memphis, Tennessee, United States
- Died: December 17 1978 (aged 83) Chicago, Illinois, United States
- Genres: Jazz
- Occupation: Musician
- Instrument: Violin

Erskine Tate (January 14, 1895, Memphis, Tennessee – December 17, 1978, Chicago) was an American jazz violinist and bandleader.

Tate moved to Chicago in 1912 and was an early figure on the Chicago jazz scene, playing with his band, the Vendome Orchestra, at the Vendome Theater, which was located at 31st and State Street. The Vendome was a movie house, and his Vendome Theater Symphony Orchestra played during silent films. The band included Louis Armstrong (trumpet), Freddie Keppard (cornet), Buster Bailey (saxophone), Jimmy Bertrand (drums), Ed Atkins (trombone), and Teddy Weatherford (piano), as well as Stump Evans, Bob Shoffner, Punch Miller, Omer Simeon, Preston Jackson, Fats Waller, and Teddy Wilson. Along with music for the movie, the orchestra played both serious and light classical repertoire, such as music by Wagner and Beethoven. Documented overtures played at the Vendome include overtures to Franz von Suppé's Poet and Peasant and Gioacchino Rossini's William Tell. In the mid-1930s, Tate retired from active performance and became a music teacher.
