= Dave Peyton =

American musician and music critic (1889–1955)

Dave Peyton (19 August 1889 – 30 April 1955) was an American songwriter, pianist, arranger, orchestra leader, and music critic columnist for the Chicago Defender.

Peyton first began as a pianist in the trio of Wilbur Sweatman, along with George Reeves, where he played from 1908 to 1912. Following this Peyton led his own ensembles in various theaters in Chicago. His sidemen included Charlie Allen, George Mitchell, Bob Shoffner, Reuben Reeves, Kid Ory, Bud Scott, Jasper Taylor, Jimmy Bertrand, Baby Dodds, Preston Jackson, Darnell Howard, Jerome Don Pasquall, and Lee Collins. While he only recorded under his own name once (with Richard M. Jones, on piano in Baby o’ Mine (1935, Decca 7115) or Joe Louis Chant), his orchestra also recorded in 1928 under Fess Williams's name (Dixie Stomp/Drifting and Dreaming, Voc. 15690). In the 1930s he led an orchestra at the Regal Theater, and from the mid-1930s until late-1940s played as a soloist in bars and nightclubs. In the 1950s he changed career and opened a dry cleaning establishment.

Peyton was known for his organising skills. He worked as a music contractor, filling orchestras with personnel upon request for the segregated black and white venues. He was able to do this in part because of his working relationship with Earnie Young (reputed to be one of the founders of the Music corporation of America). Peyton was also good at arranging music and could personalise songs for performers so that their performance of popular songs was distinctive. He did this for stars such as Al Jolson and Eva Tanguay. He wrote a weekly music column in the Chicago Defender newspaper from 1925 - 1929.

Peyton is best remembered for his songs, some of which became major hits; among them were the standard "I Ain't Got Nobody" and the tunes "Hey Stop Kissin' My Sister" and "Roumania", both performed by Fats Waller.
