= Martin Williams (writer) =

American music critic

Martin Tudor Hansford Williams (9 August 1924 – 11 or 12 April 1992) was an American jazz critic and writer.

== Education and service in the armed forces ==
Williams was born in Richmond, Virginia. He attended St. Christopher Episcopal Preparatory School, then entered the U.S. Army during World War II. After his military service during World War II, which included combat in the battle of Iwo Jima, Williams first studied law, then literature at the University of Virginia (BA 1948), at the University of Pennsylvania (MA 1950) and at Columbia University.

== Career ==
Williams, beginning in the early 1950s, became a prolific jazz critic, contributing articles to The Saturday Review, The New York Times, Harper's Magazine, Down Beat, and The Jazz Review, which he founded in November 1958 with Nat Hentoff, which often featured contributions by jazz musicians, including Gunther Schuller, Dick Katz, and Cecil Taylor. The Jazz Review also featured contributions by other notable people, including Sheldon Mayer and Dan Morgenstern.

Williams authored many books on jazz, a collection of sixteen essays, profiling jazz musicians, in a book titled The Jazz Tradition. From 1971 to 1981 Williams headed the jazz and "American Culture Program" at the Smithsonian Institution in Washington D.C., where, in 1973, he compiled and wrote liner notes for The Smithsonian Collection of Classic Jazz. In 1983, he, Gunther Schuller, and the Smithsonian — in collaboration with RCA Records — produced Big Band Jazz. With animation historian Michael Barrier, Williams co-edited A Smithsonian Book of Comic-Book Comics (1982).
