= Jimmy Bertrand =

American jazz percussionist (1900–1960)

- Born: February 24, 1900; Biloxi, Mississippi, U.S.
- Died: August 1960 (aged 60) Chicago, Illinois, U.S.
- Genres: Jazz
- Instrument: Drums

Jimmy Bertrand (February 24, 1900 – August 1960) was an American jazz and blues percussionist.

== Background ==
Bertrand was born in Biloxi, Mississippi, and was active on the Chicago blues and jazz scene of the 1920s. Bertrand recorded with Louis Armstrong, Johnny Dodds, Erskine Tate, and Blind Blake, amongst many others. In addition he led Jimmy Bertrand's Washboard Wizards. He was also a noted instructor; his pupils included Wallace Bishop, Lionel Hampton, and Big Sid Catlett. Bertrand died in Chicago in 1960.
