= New Orleans Wanderers =

The New Orleans Wanderers was the name under which Lil Hardin recorded with members of Louis Armstrong's Hot Five on a 1926 session for Columbia. Armstrong himself was unable to appear since he was under contract to Okeh, although he collaborated with Hardin on three of the four songs. Four further songs were released by the same musicians under the name New Orleans Bootblacks. His place was taken by George Mitchell.

The members of the Hot Five were Lil Hardin on piano, Kid Ory on trombone, Johnny St. Cyr on banjo and Johnny Dodds on clarinet. George Mitchell played the cornet. The tunes (all written by Louis Armstrong) were:

As New Orleans Wanderers (recorded Chicago, July 13, 1926):

- "Gate Mouth"
- "Too Tight"
- "Perdido Street Blues"
- "Papa Dip"

As New Orleans Bootblacks (recorded Chicago, July 14, 1926):

- "I Can't Say"
- "Mixed Salad"
- "Mad Dog"
- "Flat Foot"

== Partial discography ==
- "Gatemouth" (Louis Armstrong) b/w "Perdido Street Blues" (Lillian Armstrong), Columbia Swing Music Series (UK) D.B. 2860
- "Too Tight" (Louis Armstrong) b/w "Papa Dip" (Louis Armstrong), Columbia Swing Music Series (UK) D.B. 2920
