= Red Hot Peppers =

Recording jazz band led by Jelly Roll Morton from 1926–1930

The Red Hot Peppers were a recording jazz band led by Jelly Roll Morton from 1926–1930. They were a seven- or eight-piece band formed in Chicago which recorded for Victor and featured some of the best New Orleans-style freelance musicians available, including cornetist George Mitchell, trombonist Kid Ory, clarinetists Omer Simeon and Johnny Dodds, banjoists Johnny St. Cyr and Bud Scott, double bass player John Lindsay, and drummers Andrew Hilaire and Baby Dodds.

Recordings made by the group in Chicago in 1926–27, such as "Black Bottom Stomp", "Smoke-House Blues" and "Doctor Jazz" set a standard for small group jazz that is still unrivaled. Morton's skills as a composer and arranger are apparent in the structure of the pieces, which combines clarity with variety and manages to maintain a balance between ensemble and solo playing while allowing for a substantial solo from every band member. The quality of the recordings is further enhanced by the band's careful rehearsals, which were uncommon in early jazz performances. A number of Morton's best piano solos can also be heard on these recordings.

In 1928, Morton moved to New York, where he continued to make recordings under the name Red Hot Peppers, but collaborated with musicians from his regular band or from other orchestras. By 1930, the name Red Hot Peppers was no longer used.

Recordings made by the Red Hot Peppers constituted a significant contribution to the race records industry, at its height in the 1920s and 1930s. The masterful blend of composition and improvisation demonstrated by Morton and his colleagues set a precedent for early jazz.

== Discography ==
A partial discography for the Red Hot Peppers is available from the Discography of American Historical Recordings, a database edited by the University of California, Santa Barbara.

- Victor BVE-36239
  "Black Bottom Stomp" (Jelly Roll Morton)
  Recorded September 15, 1926, at the Webster Hotel in Chicago, Illinois
  Jelly Roll Morton (piano), Andrew Hilaire (drums), John Lindsay (bass), George Mitchell (cornet), Kid Ory (trombone), Johnny St. Cyr (banjo), Omer Simeon (clarinet)
- Victor BVE-36284
  "Dead Man Blues" (Jelly Roll Morton)
  Recorded September 21, 1926, at the Webster Hotel in Chicago, Illinois
  Jelly Roll Morton (piano, voice), Barney Bigard (clarinet), Marty Bloom (sound effects), Andrew Hilaire (drums), Darnell Howard (clarinet), John Lindsay (bass), George Mitchell (cornet), Kid Ory (trombone), Johnny St. Cyr (banjo, voice), Omer Simeon (clarinet)
- Victor BVE-37256
  "Original Jelly-Roll Blues" (Jelly Roll Morton)
  Recorded December 16, 1926, at the Webster Hotel in Chicago, Illinois
  Jelly Roll Morton (piano), Andrew Hilaire (drums), John Lindsay (bass), George Mitchell (cornet), Kid Ory (trombone), Johnny St. Cyr (banjo), Omer Simeon (clarinet)
- Victor BVE-37257
  "Doctor Jazz" (King Oliver)
  Recorded December 16, 1926, at the Webster Hotel in Chicago, Illinois
  Jelly Roll Morton (piano), Andrew Hilaire (drums), John Lindsay (bass), George Mitchell (cornet), Kid Ory (trombone), Johnny St. Cyr (banjo), Omer Simeon (clarinet)
- Victor BVE-38661
  "Beale Street Blues" (W. C. Handy)
  Recorded June 10, 1927, at 952 N. Michigan Avenue, Chicago, Illinois
  Jelly Roll Morton (piano), Baby Dodds (drums), Johnny Dodds (clarinet), Stump Evans (alto saxophone), George Mitchell (cornet), Gerald Reeves (trombone), Bud Scott (guitar), Quinn Wilson (tuba)
- Victor BVE-45619
  "Georgia Swing" (Jelly Roll Morton, Santo Pecora)
  Recorded June 11, 1928, at Liederkranz Hall, New York, New York
