= Andrew Hilaire =

American jazz drummer (1899–1935)

- Birth name: Andrew Henry Hilaire
- Born: February 1, 1899; New Orleans, Louisiana, U.S.
- Died: August 3, 1935 (aged 36); Chicago, Illinois, U.S.
- Genres: Jazz
- Instruments: Drums

Andrew Henry Hilaire (February 1, 1899 – August 3, 1935) was an American jazz drummer active from the 1910s to early-1930s.

== Early life ==
Hilaire was born in New Orleans of a middle-class, Creole of color family that lived in the French Quarter. His family moved to Chicago in the 1910s. By 1917, he was touring Vaudeville with the Tennessee Ten jazz band, fronted by Florence Mills.

== Career ==
Hilaire was active in Chicago's "Roaring Twenties" music scene, playing with the bands of Lil Hardin Armstrong and Carroll Dickerson before eight years with Doc Cook. He took part in various recording sessions during his time with the Doc Cook Orchestra, including with Freddie Keppard and as a member of Jelly Roll Morton's Red Hot Peppers.

In the 1930s, he played with Jerome Don Pasquall and Eddie South in addition to leading his own band.

== Personal life ==
During his life, Hilaire had trouble breathing due to either asthma or tuberculosis. He died at home in Chicago at the age of 36.
