= Fess Williams =

American jazz musician (1894–1975)

- Fess Williams in 1925

Background information
- Also known as: Professor or "Fess"
- Born: Stanley R. Williams; April 10, 1894; Danville, Kentucky, U.S.
- Died: December 17, 1975 (aged 81) New York City, U.S.
- Genres: Jazz, swing
- Instruments: Clarinet, alto saxophone
- Years active: 1920s–1940s
- Labels: Victor, Vocalion, Gennett, Okeh, Brunswick, Champion, Harmony
- Formerly of: Fess Williams and his Royal Flush Orchestra, Fess Williams and His Joy Boys

Fess Williams (born Stanley R. Williams; April 10, 1894 – December 17, 1975) was an American jazz musician.

== Early life ==
As a child Williams played several instruments. He received his formal education from N. Clark-Smith at Tuskegee University. By his late teens he had settled on clarinet, and soon afterwards formed the first of many bands he was to lead over the coming years.

== Career ==
From 1919 to 1923, he led his own band before moving to Chicago, Illinois, and joining Ollie Powers. In 1923, he formed a new group in order to back the variety act Dave and Tressie and traveled to New York with them in 1924. There he led a trio in Albany, New York, as well as a band that played at the Rosemont Ballroom.

In 1926, Williams formed the Royal Flush Orchestra. The popular hot jazz outfit held residency at Harlem's Savoy Ballroom for most of its life, and recorded on the Victor, Vocalion, Gennett, Okeh, Brunswick, Champion, and Harmony labels. Williams, Frank Marvin, and Perry Smith supplied vocals. The flamboyant Williams typically performed wearing a diamond-studded white suit and top hat. During this time he recorded many of his own compositions such as "Friction", "Here 'Tis" and his highest selling record, "Hot Town".

In 1928, Williams traveled to Chicago where he temporarily fronted Dave Peyton's band at the Regal Theatre. Calling the group Fess Williams and His Joy Boys, he recorded two sides with them for Vocalion Records. The Royal Flush Orchestra continued to operate in his absence, and in 1929 he returned to New York to resume his duties.

The Royal Flush Orchestra recorded its last side in 1930. Williams remained active as a bandleader, but as the decade progressed his sound became outdated. He fell out of favor with the public and eventually retired from performing full-time to sell real estate. He continued to lead bands periodically during the 1940s and beyond.

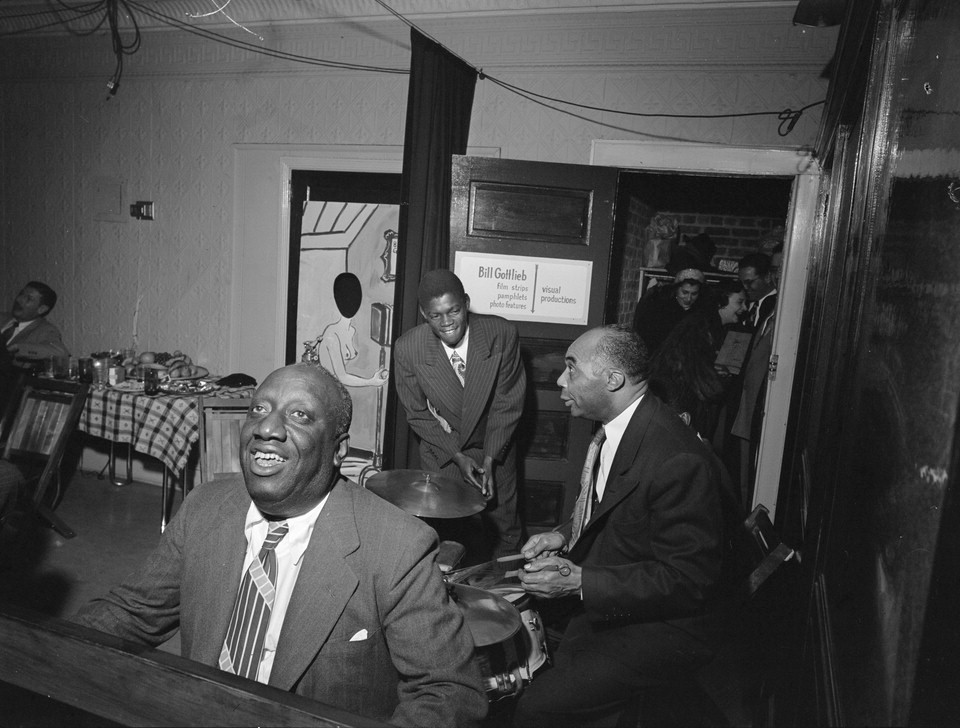
James P. Johnson, Fess Williams, Freddie Moore, Joe Thomas 1948. Photography by William P. Gottlieb.

== Playing style ==
Williams played in a style reminiscent of Ted Lewis, only less smoothly. He also specialized in the style of Gas Pipe Clarinet which is when the instrument is used to produce all kinds of honks, growls, squeaks and effects that sounded like animal noises, laughter or other sounds you would not expect to hear from a clarinet. He was also a fine exponent of slap tonguing, and utilized circular breathing. This is shown off in his composition "Playing My Saxophone".

== Town Hall concert ==
Williams came from—and fathered—a musical family; his brother Rudolph was a saxophonist and clarinetist, his sons Rudy and Phil were both saxophonists, and his daughter Estella was a pianist and vocalist. He was also the uncle of the double bassist Charles Mingus who, in 1962, brought Williams back into the spotlight briefly as a guest for the Town Hall concert.

== Collaborators and members of Williams' orchestras ==
- Danny Barker (1909–1994), banjoist
- Jabbo Smith (1908–1991), trumpeter
