= George Mitchell (jazz musician) =

American jazz cornet player (1899–1972)

- Born: March 8, 1899; Louisville, Kentucky, U.S.
- Died: May 22, 1972 (aged 73); Chicago, Illinois, U.S.
- Genres: Jazz
- Instruments: Cornet

George "Little Mitch" Mitchell (March 8, 1899 – May 22, 1972) was an American jazz cornet player active in the 1920s.

== Early life ==
Mitchell was born in Louisville, Kentucky. He began playing the cornet at the age of 12 and joined a local brass band in Louisville.

== Career ==
From 1921 to 1923, Mitchell recorded with Johnny Dunn's Original Jazz Hounds and Johnny Dunn's Original Jazz Band on the Columbia label. In 1926, he recorded with the New Orleans Wanderers and New Orleans Bootblacks, taking the place of the unavailable Louis Armstrong, and shortly afterwards recorded with Jelly Roll Morton's Red Hot Peppers. He also recorded with Luis Russell, Johnny Dodds and The Earl Hines Orchestra.

He ceased to be active in music about 1931 and became a bank messenger.
