= Avalon Regal Theater =

Music hall and theater in Chicago, Illinois, United States

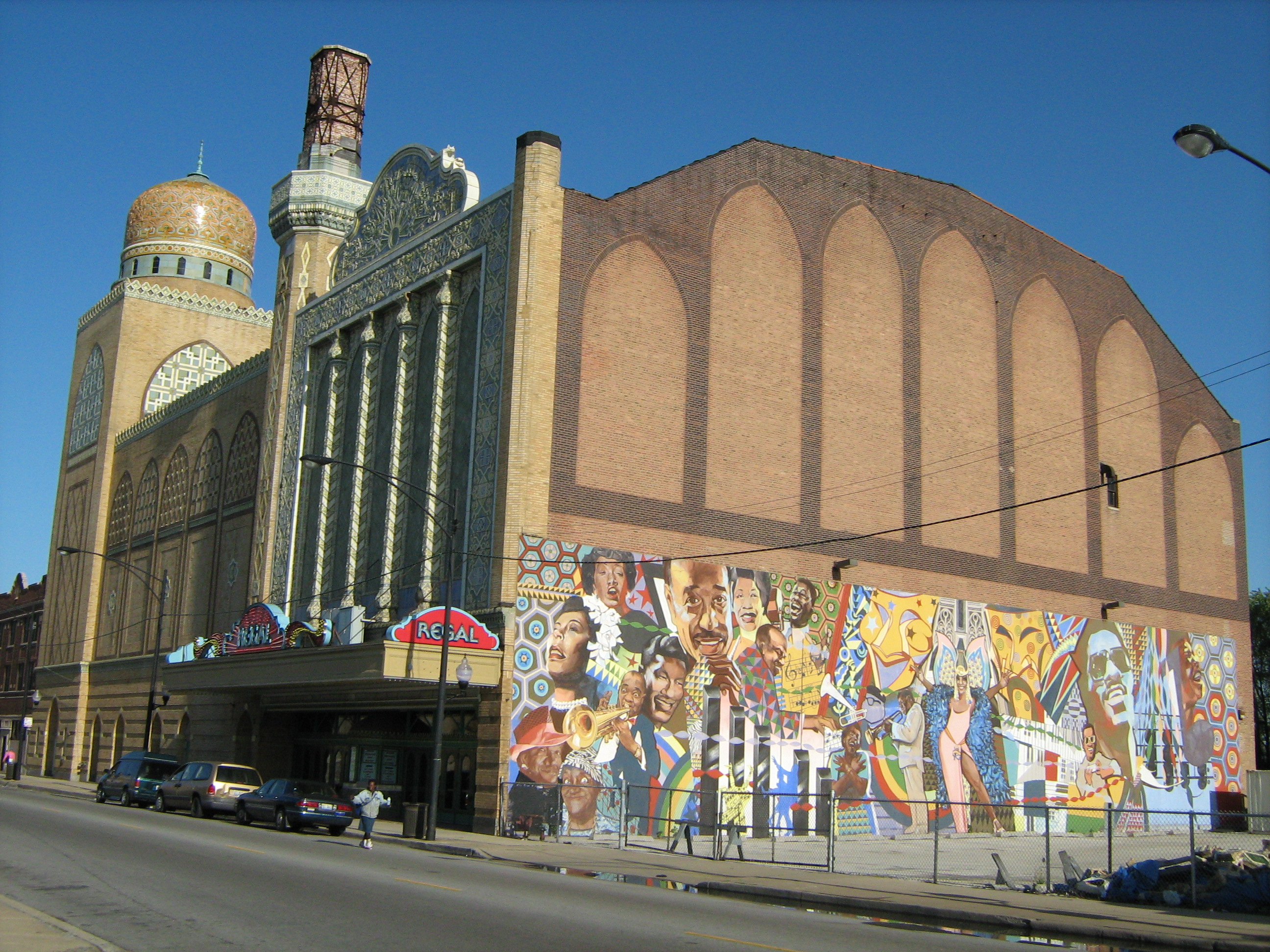
- Interactive map of Avalon Regal Theater
- Address: 1641 East 79th Street; Chicago, Illinois; United States
- Coordinates: 41°45′05″N 87°35′01″W
- Owner: Community Capital Investment, LLC
- Operator: Chicago Regal Foundation 501(c)(3)
- Capacity: 2,250 seats
- Type: Performing Arts Center; African American Cultural Center
- Designation: Chicago Landmark (June 17, 1992)

Construction
- Opened: August 29, 1927
- Closed: June 26, 2003–August 2008; March 2010
- Rebuilt: 1985 (renovated)
- Years active: 1927–1967; 1970–1985; 1987–2003; 2008–2010
- Architect: John Eberson

Website
- regaltheater.org

Chicago Landmark
- Official name: New Regal Theater
- Type: Cultural venue
- Designated: June 17, 1992

The Avalon Regal Theater (originally the Avalon Theater, and later the New Regal Theater) is a music hall located at 1641 East 79th Street, bordered by the Avalon Park and South Shore neighborhoods on the south side of Chicago, Illinois, United States. The theater opened in August 1927 and is a noted venue for African-American performers.

== Architecture ==
Architecturally, the Avalon Regal's atmospheric and Moorish Revivalist theme was conceived by Austrian-born architect John Eberson, who was nationally known for his exotic motifs. Eberson was reportedly inspired by an ornate Persian incense burner he found in an antique market in the French Quarter of New Orleans.

== History ==
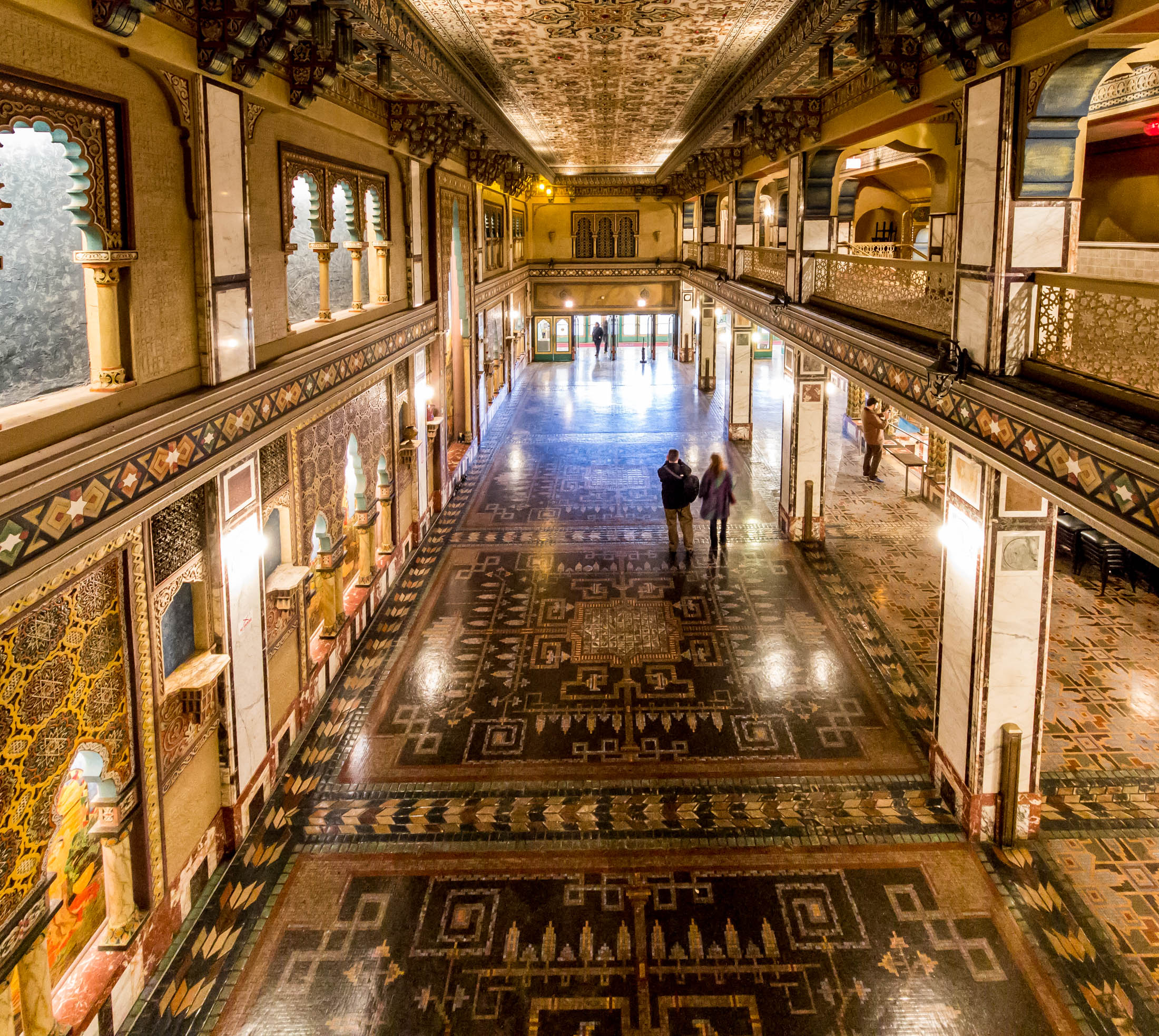
View of the lobby, looking toward entrance

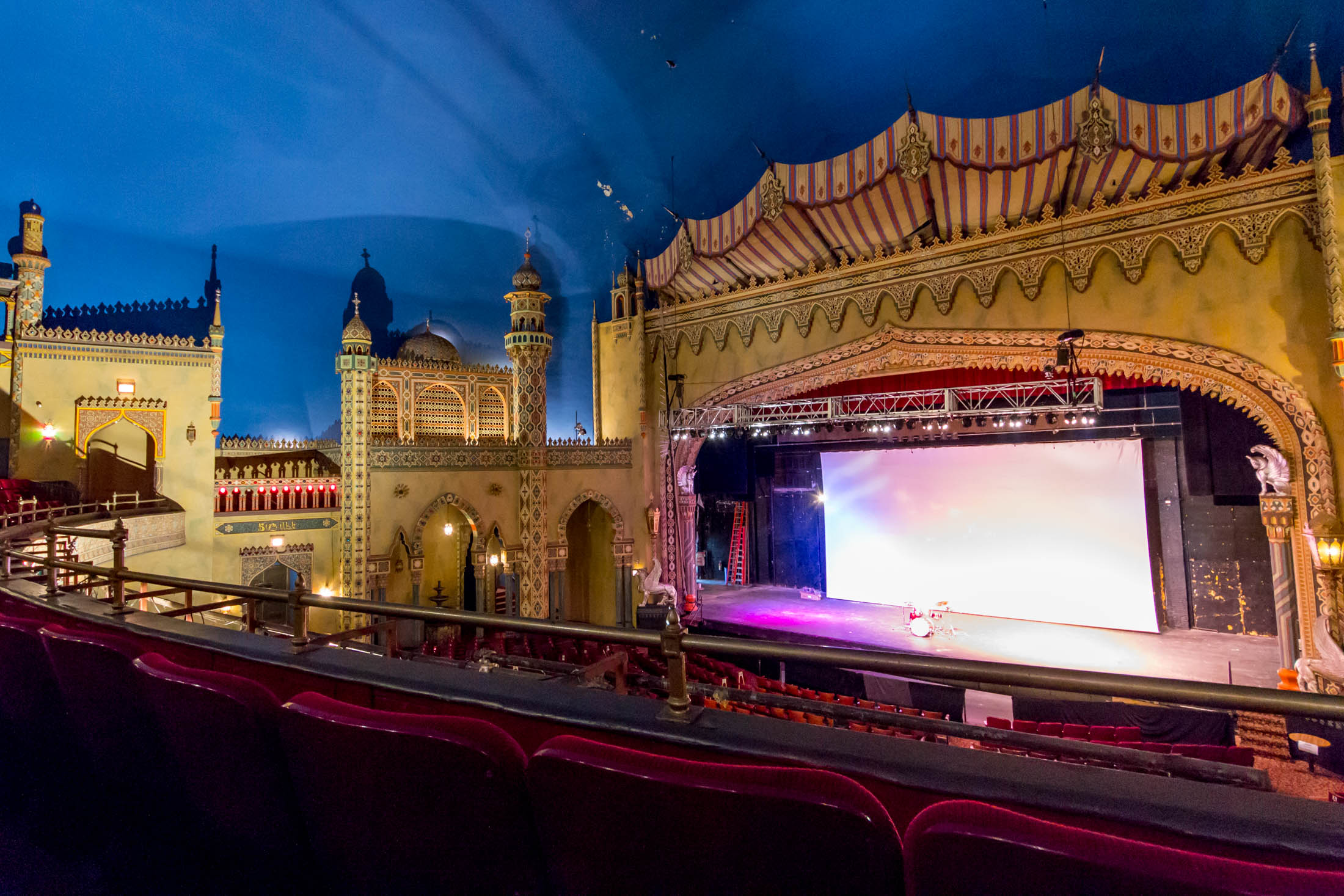
View of stage from second tier

The theater opened as the Avalon Theater on August 29, 1927, when the community was known as Avalon Park, a then predominantly German, Swedish, and Irish neighborhood. At the time of its opening, The theater served as a live performing arts venue until 1934. During the 1960s, more African Americans began to move into the area around the theater, becoming a staple for the Black community in the area.

The Avalon Theater operated as a movie theater from 1935 until its closing in 1967. When the theater was sold in 1970, It served as the Miracle Temple Church and a meeting place for 14 years. In 1985, the building was purchased by Edward and Bettiann Gardner, the founders of Soft Sheen Products. The Gardners renovated and reopened the theater as a performing arts venue in 1987, renaming it to The New Regal Theater in honor of the old Regal Theater in Bronzeville, a celebrated cultural center for Chicago's African American community from the 1920s to 1971. In May 1987, the theater received a $1 million grant for renovations from Illinois Development Action Grant program under mayor Harold Washington's administration, part of a financial package totaling $4.1 million. The theater received Chicago Landmark status on June 17, 1992. In June 2003, after 18 years, the Gardners closed the theater due to low attendance and operational cost of the building.

In 2008, the theater was purchased by Regina Evans, police chief of Country Club Hills, Illinois, and a state fund of $2.36 million, with the intent of reviving it as a cultural venue. Evans secured a state loan for $1.25 million for renovations to the theater but used the funds for personal use. The site held a party to celebrate Barack Obama's presidential nomination acceptance speech in August 2008. The theater was foreclosed and the Federal Deposit Insurance Corp. acquired the theater in 2011. It was later sold to Community Capital Investment, LLC. Jerald Gary, president and chief investment officer of Community Capital Investment Partners, LLC purchased the theater for $100,000 in a foreclosure deal in 2010 or February 2014. In September 2018, rapper and Chicago native Kanye West committed to help restore the theater, pledging to donate $1 million.

The Chicago Regal Foundation was created to raise funds to reopen and operate the Avalon Regal Theater, and offers tours of the building during the Chicago Architecture Foundation's annual Open House Chicago.
