= The Cab Calloway Orchestra =

American jazz band (1930–1940s)

Cab Calloway Orchestra
- Origin: Cotton Club, Harlem, New York, U.S.
- Years active: 1930–1940s
- Labels: Brunswick; Banner; Cameo; Conqueror; Perfect; Melotone; Oriole; RCA Victor; Variety; Vocalion; OKeh
- Past members: Cab Calloway

The Cab Calloway Orchestra, based at the exclusive Cotton Club in Harlem, was, for over a decade, one of the most important jazz bands in America. Different lineups featured the best available established musicians.

In 1930, Cab Calloway was hired to replace Duke Ellington at the Cotton Club, and recorded for Brunswick and ARC's dime-store labels (Banner, Cameo, Conqueror, Perfect, Melotone, Oriole, etc.) from 1930 to 1932. In 1932, he signed with RCA Victor for a year, but he was back on Brunswick in late 1934 through 1936, when he signed with manager Irving Mills's short-lived Variety in 1937, with whom he stayed with until the label's collapse; the sessions were continued on Vocalion through 1939 and then on OKeh through 1942.

When the Cotton Club closed in 1940, Calloway and his band went on a tour of the United States.

In 1941, Calloway fired Dizzy Gillespie from his orchestra after an onstage fracas. Calloway wrongly accused Gillespie of throwing a spitball; in the ensuing altercation, Gillespie stabbed Calloway in the leg with a small knife.

The band broke up in the late 1940s.

== Original band members ==
The first Cab Calloway Orchestra comprised Earres Prince on piano; Walter "Foots" Thomas and Thornton Blue on alto saxophones; Andrew Brown on tenor saxophone; R.Q. Dickerson and Lammar Wright Sr. on trumpets; DePriest Wheeler on trombone; Jimmy Smith on tuba; Morris White on banjo; and Leroy Maxey on drums.

== Full list of band members ==
=== Saxophone ===
Thornton Blue, Hilton Jefferson, Ben Webster, Leon "Chu" Berry, Chauncey Haughton, Rudy Powell, Andrew Brown, Walter "Foots" Thomas, Ike Quebec, Arville Harris (1931), Jerry Blake, Ben (Benjamin) Whitted (tenor saxophone)

=== Trumpet ===
R. Q. Dickerson, Dizzy Gillespie, Mario Bauzá, Adolphus "Doc" Cheatham (1931–9), Reuben Reeves (1931), Shad Collins (mid-1940s), Paul Webster (mid-1940s), Jonah Jones

=== Trombone ===
Claude Jones, Lammar Wright Sr., Keg Johnson, DePriest Wheeler, Floyd Marmon (1931–34), Tyree Glenn, Quentin Jackson

=== Tuba ===
Jimmy Smith

=== Piano ===
Earres Prince, Benny Payne, Dave Rivera (mid-1940s)

=== Guitar ===
Danny Barker

=== Bass ===
Al Morgan, Milt Hinton

=== Drums ===
Leroy Maxey, Cozy Cole, J. C. Heard (mid-1940s)
