= The Missourians (band) =

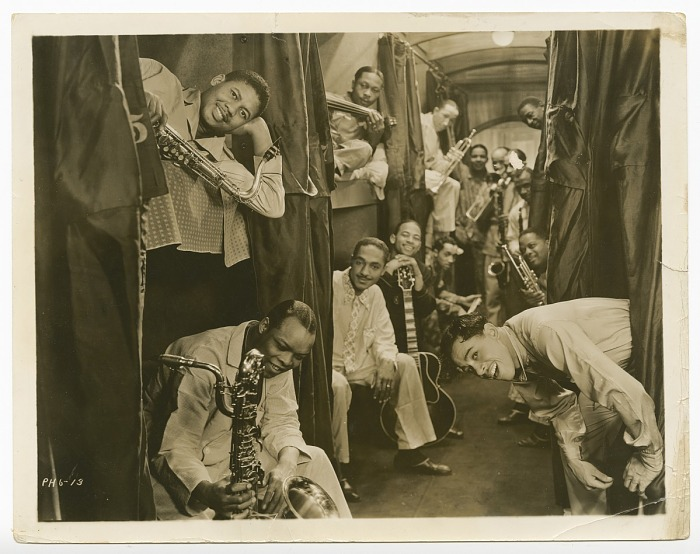
- Cab Calloway and members of his band sit in a sleeper train car

Background information
- Origin: St. Louis, Missouri, US
- Genres: Jazz
- Years active: 1923-
- Past members: Lammar Wright Sr.; R.Q. Dickerson (trumpet); Lockwood Lewis (vocals); Leroy Maxey (drums); George Scott (clarinet, alto saxophone); Dewey Jackson; William Thornton Blue (clarinet, alto saxophone); David Jones; Earres Prince (piano); Andrew Brown; DePriest Wheeler (trombone); Andy Brown (clarinet, tenor saxophone); Jimmy Smith (tuba); Morris White (violin)

The Missourians were an American jazz band active in the 1920s, who performed at the Cotton Club in New York City and eventually became the backing band for Cab Calloway.

The Missourians were formed by violinist Wilson Robinson in St. Louis in 1923 under the name Wilson Robinson's Bostonians. Later that year, the group moved to Chicago and changed their name to Willie Robinson's Syncopators. In 1923 and 1924 they toured widely including both the East and West coasts. Andrew Preer took leadership of the group in 1925, and brought them to perform at the Cotton Club until 1927 under the name Andrew Preer's Cotton Club Orchestra. In 1927 the group became the accompanying band for Ethel Waters on tour, and changed its name to The Missourians, since Duke Ellington's band had become known as the Cotton Club Orchestra. After returning to New York the band took up residency at the Savoy Ballroom from 1928 to 1929; reedist George Scott was its leader during this period. In 1929, Cab Calloway led the group intermittently, and assumed leadership of the band in 1930; soon after he began recording as Cab Calloway and His Orchestra. Prior to Calloway's arrival, the group recorded for Gennett Records and Victor Records. The group's membership in the 1920s included Lammar Wright Sr., R.Q. Dickerson, Dewey Jackson, William Thornton Blue, David Jones, Earres Prince, and Andrew Brown.

In 2007, Big Bill Bissonnette released Slip Horn, a CD on his Jazz Crusade Label. The CD included works from trombonists Kid Ory, Preston Jackson and DePriest Wheeler, the latter of which a member of The Missourians. Additionally, the CD's final five tracks were songs by the Missourians, who Bissonnette claimed as his "favorite band."

== Discography ==
The Missourians recorded for Victor Records between 1929 and 1930.

Date	Title	Label	Notes
June 3, 1929	"Market Street Stomp"	Victor	
June 3, 1929	"Ozark Mountain Blues"	Victor	
June 3, 1929	"You'll Cry for Me, but I'll Be Gone"	Victor	
June 3, 1929	"Missouri Moan"	Victor	
August 1, 1929	"I've Got Someone"	Victor	
August 1, 1929	"'400' Hop"	Victor	
August 1, 1929	"Vine Street Drag"	Victor	
February 17, 1930	"Two Hundred Squabble"	Victor	
February 17, 1930	"Swingin' Dem Cats"	Victor	
February 17, 1930	"Stoppin' the Traffic"	Victor	
February 17, 1930	"Prohibition Blues"	Victor	
