= How Big Can You Get?: The Music of Cab Calloway =

Studio album by Big Bad Voodoo Daddy
- Released: April 21, 2009
- Genre: Swing revival
- Length: 44:36
- Label: Vanguard

Big Bad Voodoo Daddy chronology
Everything You Want for Christmas (2004)	How Big Can You Get?: The Music of Cab Calloway (2009)	Rattle Them Bones (2012)

Professional ratings
Review scores
Source	Rating
AllMusic	3.5/5 stars

How Big Can You Get?: The Music of Cab Calloway is the sixth studio album released by the American musical group Big Bad Voodoo Daddy. The album features songs written or performed by bandleader Cab Calloway during his heyday of the 1930s to 1950s.

== Track listing ==
1. "Come On with the "Come On"" (Cab Calloway, Andy Gibson) – 3:22
2. "Calloway Boogie" (Calloway, Allen Leroy Gibson) – 4:02
3. "The Call of the Jitterbug" (Calloway, Irving Mills, Ed Swayze) – 3:29
4. "Hey Now, Hey Now" (Calloway, Elton Hill) – 4:34
5. "The Jumpin' Jive" (Calloway, Frank Froeba, Jack Palmer) – 4:01
6. "How Big Can You Get?" (Calloway, Buck Ram) – 4:05
7. "The Old Man of the Mountain" (George Brown, Victor Young) – 4:15
8. "The Ghost of Smokey Joe" (Rube Bloom, Ted Koehler) – 5:28
9. "Reefer Man" (J. Russel Robinson, Andy Razaf) – 2:54
10. "Minnie the Moocher" (Calloway, Mills) – 4:59
11. "Tarzan of Harlem" (Lupin Fein, Mills, Henry Nemo, Ram) – 3:24

== Personnel ==
- Karl Hunter – alto and tenor saxophone, clarinet
- Joshua Levy – piano, arranger, producer
- Glen "The Kid" Marhevka – trumpet
- Scotty Morris – vocals, guitar, producer, mixer
- Andy Rowley – baritone saxophone, vocals
- Dirk Shumaker – acoustic bass guitar, vocals
- Kurt Sodergren – drums

=== Additional musicians ===
- Alex "Crazy Legs" Henderson
- Anthony Bonsera Jr.
- Ira Nepus
- Tom Peterson
- Lee Thornburg
- Bernie Dresel
- Nick Lane
- Robbie Hioki
- Brian Swartz
- Scheila Gonzalez
- Lee Callet
- Jim Fox
