= Big Bad Voodoo Daddy (album) =

Studio album by Big Bad Voodoo Daddy
- Released: 1994
- Genre: Swing revival; jump blues
- Length: 41:36
- Label: Big Bad Records

Big Bad Voodoo Daddy chronology
Big Bad Voodoo Daddy (1994)	Watchu' Want for Christmas? (1997)

Professional ratings
Review scores
Source	Rating
AllMusic	2.5/5 stars

Big Bad Voodoo Daddy is the self-titled debut album by contemporary swing band Big Bad Voodoo Daddy released on the bands-own record label Big Bad Records. The band re-recorded the songs "Jumpin' Jack" and "King of Swing" for their following full-length album Americana Deluxe. Also, "So Long, Good Bye" appears on Americana Deluxe in a re-recorded version having the title slightly modified to "So Long, Farewell, Goodbye". "Machine Gun" was re-recorded for their third full-length album This Beautiful Life and appears under the title "2000 Volts" with modified lyrics. "13 Women" is a cover version of the song originally performed by Bill Haley & His Comets. "Fire" is originally performed by Louis Jordan.

== Track listing ==
Big Bad Voodoo Daddy track listing
No.	Title	Length
1.	"Jumpin' Jack"	4:41
2.	"13 Women"	5:04
3.	"Cruel Spell"	5:21
4.	"King of Swing"	5:15
5.	"Beggars' Blues"	5:35
6.	"Machine Gun"	5:31
7.	"Fire"	2:55
8.	"She's Gone"	3:08
9.	"So Long, Good Bye"	4:11
Total length:		41:36

== Personnel ==
- Scotty Morris – vocals, guitar
- Dirk Shumaker – Bass, vocals
- Andy Rowley – baritone, tenor saxophone, vocals
- Ralph Votrian – trumpet, vocals
- Kurt Sodergren – Drums, percussion

=== Additional Musicians ===
- Stan Middleton – trombone
- Bob Ayer – clarinet

== Charts ==
=== Weekly charts ===
Chart (1998)	Peak position
US Billboard 200	47

=== Year-end charts ===
Chart (1998)	Position
US Billboard 200	111
