= Walter Thomas (musician) =

American jazz saxophonist, flutist, and arranger (1907–1981)

- Also known as: Foots Thomas
- Born: February 10, 1907; Muskogee, Oklahoma, U.S.
- Origin: St. Louis, Missouri, U.S.
- Died: August 26, 1981 (aged 74); Englewood, New Jersey, U.S.
- Genres: Jazz
- Instruments: Saxophone, flute

Walter Purl "Foots" Thomas (February 10, 1907 – August 26, 1981) was an American saxophonist, flutist, and arranger in Cab Calloway's orchestra, one of the most famous bands of the swing era in jazz.

== Early life ==
Born in Muskogee, Oklahoma, Thomas moved to St. Louis, Missouri, where he played in Ed Allen's Whispering Band of Gold in the early 1920s. In 1924, he recorded with Fate Marable's Society Orchestra.

== Career ==
In 1927, Thomas moved to New York City, where he played with the New Orleans pianist and composer Jelly Roll Morton and Joe Steele. He then joined The Missourians in 1929, just before Calloway took the band over. Among his arrangements was Calloway's 1931 hit song, "Minnie the Moocher."

In 1943, he left Calloway's orchestra to work with the saxophonist and composer Don Redman. He led a 1944 recording session with sidemen including Coleman Hawkins, Hilton Jefferson, Eddie Barefield, and Jonah Jones; another session that year featured Ben Webster, Budd Johnson, and Emmett Berry.

During the mid-1940s he taught at a studio on West 48th Street in New York City; among his students was the hard bop alto saxophonist Jackie McLean. In the 1950s he became a manager and booking agent; he worked for the Shaw Artists Corporation, and for a time one of his clients was the trumpeter Dizzy Gillespie.

Thomas was inducted into the Oklahoma Jazz Hall of Fame in 1996.

== Personal life ==
Thomas's older sister was the chef and author Cleora Butler; his younger brother was the alto saxophonist and songwriter Joe Thomas.

Thomas lived with his wife, Marlyne, and their children in Englewood, New Jersey, near his old friend the trombonist Tyree Glenn, with whom he spent much time in retirement. He died from cancer on August 26, 1981.

== Bibliography ==
- Schuller, Gunther. The Swing Era: The Development of Jazz, 1930–1945 (1991), Oxford Paperbacks ISBN 0-19-507140-9
