= Save My Soul (album) =

Studio album by Big Bad Voodoo Daddy
- Released: July 8, 2003
- Genre: Swing revival
- Length: 41:12
- Label: Vanguard Records
- Producer: Scotty Morris, Big Bad Voodoo Daddy

Big Bad Voodoo Daddy chronology
This Beautiful Life (1999)	Save My Soul (2003)	Everything You Want for Christmas (2004)

Professional ratings
Review scores
Source	Rating
AllMusic	3/5 stars
PopMatters	

Save My Soul is the fourth studio album by swing group Big Bad Voodoo Daddy. It was released by Vanguard Records on July 8, 2003.

== Track listing ==
All songs written by Scotty Morris and arranged by Big Bad Voodoo Daddy, except where noted.

No.	Title	Writer(s)	Arranged by	Length
1.	"Zig Zaggity Woop Woop Pt. 1"			2:32
2.	"You Know You Wrong"			4:47
3.	"Always Gonna Get Ya"		Big Bad Voodoo Daddy, Tom Peterson	2:52
4.	""Don't You" Feel My Leg"	D. Baker, K. Harris		4:58
5.	"Oh Yeah"			4:36
6.	"Simple Songs"			4:29
7.	"Next Week Sometime"	Traditional
8.	"Save My Soul"		Big Bad Voodoo Daddy, Tom Peterson	6:34
9.	"I Like It"			4:19
10.	"Zig Zaggity Woop Woop Pt. 2"			4:44
11.	Untitled			0:53

== Personnel ==
- Scotty Morris - vocals, guitar
- Karl Hunter - clarinet, soprano, tenor, and alto saxophone
- Andy Rowley - baritone saxophone, background vocals
- Glen "The Kid" Marhevka - trumpet, cornet
- Joshua Levy - piano
- Dirk Shumaker - double bass, background vocals
- Kurt Sodergren - drums

=== Additional musicians and personnel ===
- Ron Blake - trumpet
- Lenny Castro - percussion
- Lee Thornburg - trumpet
- Ira Nepus - trombone
- John Noreyko - tuba, sousaphone
- Scotty Morris, Big Bad Voodoo Daddy - producer
- David Boucher and Ryan Freeland, Mark Ross - engineers
- Elliot Scheiner - mixer

== Charts ==
Chart performance for Save My Soul
Chart (2003)	Peak position
US Billboard 200	195
