= Elmon Wright =

- Born: October 27, 1929; U.S.
- Died: 1984 (aged 54–55)
- Genres: Jazz
- Occupation: Musician
- Instrument: Trumpet
- Years active: 1940s–1960s

Elmon Wright (October 27, 1929 – 1984) was an American jazz trumpeter. He was the son of Lammar Wright Sr. and the brother of Lammar Wright Jr.

Wright played with Don Redman early in his career, then with Dizzy Gillespie's first big band in 1945. Following this he played with Roy Eldridge and then went back to Gillespie's band, touring and recording with him from 1946 until 1950. He toured with Earl Bostic in 1954–55, then worked as a freelance musician in New York City, where he performed at the Apollo Theater in Harlem with R&B and rock groups. He played with Buddy Rich and Earle Warren in 1959 and recorded with Milt Jackson in 1963.

== Discography ==
With Dizzy Gillespie

- Good Bait (Spotlite, 1976)
- Groovin' High (Savoy, 1955)
- In the Beginning (Prestige 1973)
- Live at the Downbeat Club Summer 1947 (Jazz Guild, 1977)
- Live at the Spotlite '46 (Hi-Fly, 1978)
- The Complete RCA Victor Recordings (Bluebird, 1995)

With Milt Jackson

- For Someone I Love (Riverside, 1963)
- Big Band Bags (Milestone, 1973)
