= David Jones (jazz musician) =

American jazz musician

- Born: 1888; Lutcher, Louisiana, U.S.
- Died: 1956 (aged 67–68) Los Angeles, California, U.S.
- Genres: Jazz
- Occupation: Musician
- Instruments: Saxophone, mellophone

David Jones (c. 1888 – 1956) was an American jazz tenor saxophonist, mellophonist, teacher and arranger.

== Biography ==
Jones played with the Holmes Brass Band in his hometown of Lutcher in 1910, then played in Storyville, New Orleans, in the middle of the decade. He worked on the S.S. Capitol with Fate Marable from 1918 to 1921. Davey joined Marable's band at the same time as Louis Armstrong and taught the 17-year-old how to read sheet music.

Jones played with King Oliver in California in 1921, and then worked in St. Louis, Missouri, with R.Q. Dickerson's Record Breakers in 1922. Following this, he and Dickerson found work in Wilson Robinson's Bostonians, remaining in this ensemble after Andrew Peer took over and led the group for a residency at the Cotton Club in New York City. This group recorded as the Cotton Club Orchestra in 1925 and later was known as The Missourians.

Jones then returned to New Orleans to lead his own band at the Pelican Dance Hall. He played briefly with William Ridgley's Tuxedo Orchestra, then co-led the Jones & Collins Astoria Hot Eight with Lee Collins. Davey also gave lessons to young trumpeter Joe Newman, who later played with Count Basie.

Jones lived in California later in life, and died in 1965.
