= Monstrosity =

Monstrosity may refer to:

- Monstrosity (band), a death metal band from Florida
- Monstrosity (film), a 1963 science fiction film
- Monstrosity!, a 1988 album by the California State University, Los Angeles Jazz Ensemble

== See also ==
- Monster
- Monstrous birth
