= William Thornton Blue =

American jazz musician

William Thornton Blue (1902 – 1968), sometimes credited as Bill Blue, was an American jazz reed player.

Blue grew up playing in local bands in St. Louis, Missouri, where his father was a part-time music instructor. He played with Wilson Robinson's Bostonians, a territory band, and worked with Charlie Creath and Dewey Jackson in the middle of the 1920s. Later that decade he worked with Andrew Preer's Cotton Club Orchestra in New York City and on tour in Europe as a member of Noble Sissle's ensemble. He remained in Paris briefly, playing with John Ricks.

When he returned to New York, he joined The Missourians, led by Cab Calloway, then worked with Luis Russell. Due to failing health, Blue played little in the late 1930s and afterwards; he spent the last several years of his life in a sanatorium.
