= It's About Time (CSULA album) =

Studio album by California State University, Los Angeles Jazz Ensembles
- Released: 1990
- Recorded: Group IV Recording; Los Angeles, California; Sage and Sound Recording; Hollywood, California
- Genre: Jazz, big band, instrumental
- Label: CSULA 890
- Producer: David Caffey, Jeff Benedict, Scott Ackerman

California State University, Los Angeles Jazz Ensembles chronology
| Monstrosity! (1988) | It's About Time (1990) | For the Love of Art (1992) |
- cat. # CSULA 890

Audio sample
- "It's About Time": file; help

Audio sample
- "The Glide": file; help

It's About Time is the first CD digital format album release by the California State University, Los Angeles Jazz Ensembles completed in 1990. In addition to two big bands (1989/1990) the CD features the CSULA Jazz Sextet. The jazz bands had numerous student musicians that have made a name for themselves as professionals to include Luis Bonilla, Jack Cooper, Corey Gemme, Alan Parr, Randall Willis, Paul De Castro, Alex Henderson, Sheffer Bruton, Ruben Ramos, and José Arellano.

== Background ==
In 1984 and 1985, the California State University, Los Angeles Music Department and CSULA Associated Students decided to fund LP recordings of the jazz ensemble to better serve as a teaching tool for student music, jazz groups. It's About Times is the fifth of six albums to come from CSULA during the 1980s featuring the award-winning CSULA #1 Jazz Ensemble. The CD contains tracks from the #1 CSULA Jazz Ensembles of two successive years and a sextet to include compositions of five students and from the two directors (professors David Caffey and Jeff Benedict).

There has been a consistent tradition of musicians coming from the CSULA program who have worked with major musical acts, on major studio and movie projects, and hold positions in higher education in music. The roster on this album is self-evident as to the diversity and level of student musicians CSULA developed at that time and has for many years dating far back to musicians (graduates) such as Lennie Niehaus and Gabe Baltazar.

== Track listing ==
All tracks are written by various artists listed.

| No. | Title | Length |
|---|---|---|
| 1. | "It's About Time (José Arellano)" | 5:16 |
| 2. | "Only Forever (David Caffey)" | 5:40 |
| 3. | "The Glide (Ralph Towner, arr. Scott Ackerman)" | 7:34 |
| 4. | "There's a Small Hotel (Richard Rodgers, arr. Jack Cooper)" | 7:08 |
| 5. | "Tentatively Kimberly (Paul De Castro) - CSULA Jazz Sextet" | 7:03 |
| 6. | "Not A Moment To Lose (Ruben Ramos) - CSULA Jazz Sextet" | 7:03 |
| 7. | "Chick's Delight (Paul De Castro) - CSULA Jazz Sextet" | 3:23 |
| 8. | "Castle Creek Shuffle (Jeff Benedict)" | 6:33 |
| 9. | "Ain't It Wonderful? (Tom Kubis)" | 4:30 |
| 10. | "Incredible Journey (Bob Mintzer)" | 7:16 |
| Total length: | | 44:65 |

== Recording Sessions ==
- Recorded: May 11, 1989 Group IV Recording, Los Angeles, California
- Recorded: May 5 and 6, 1990 Sage and Sound Recording, Hollywood, California
- Mixing: May 25 and June 1, 1990 Sage and Sound Recording, Hollywood, California

== Personnel ==
=== Musicians ===
- Conductor: David Caffey and Jeff Benedict
- Saxes and woodwinds: Jack Cooper, David Quillen, Randall Willis, Victor Cisneros, Brian McFadin, Erick Clements, Luis Segovia
- Trumpets and flugelhorns: Alan Parr, Howard Choy, Corey Gemme, Jim Bynum, Steve Sotomoyor, Bub Gordon, Mike Collins
- Trombones: Gary Smith, Luis Bonilla, José Arellano, Alex Henderson, Brian Money, Gabino Varela, Sheffer Bruton
- Guitar: Andre Bush
- Piano: Paul De Castro, Richard Kahn
- Vibraphone and marimba: Cory Estrada
- Bass: Ruben Ramos
- Drums: Marc Guité
- Percussion: Mike Erpino

=== Production ===
- Recording engineers (Group IV Recording): George Belle
- Recording engineers (Sage & Sound): Jim Mooney and Jerry Wood
- Mixing engineers: George Belle (1989)
- Mixing engineers: Jim Mooney and David Caffey (1990)
- Mastering: CMS Digital, Robert Vosgien
- Cover photo: Greg Parks
