= Diversions (album) =

Studio album by California State University, Los Angeles Jazz Ensemble
- Released: 1987
- Recorded: Sage and Sound Recording; Hollywood, California
- Genres: Jazz, Big band, instrumental
- Length: 46:12
- Label: H D C Music Publications
- Producers: David Caffey, Charles Richard, and Scott Ackerman

California State University, Los Angeles Jazz Ensemble chronology
We're Back! (1986)	Diversions (1987)	Monstrosity! (1988)
- cat. # CSULA 887

Audio sample
- "Con Alma": file; help

Diversions is a 1987 album (LP Vinyl) released by the California State University, Los Angeles Jazz Ensemble, it featured the Charles Richard Suite for Jazz Orchestra which was premiered by Dave Edwards earlier that year. This group proved to be one of the finest college jazz orchestras of that era with having placed in the finals of the Pacific Coast Collegiate Jazz Festival. The jazz band had numerous student musicians that have made a name for themselves as professionals to include Sharon Hirata, Luis Bonilla, Jack Cooper, Charlie Richard, Eric "Bobo" Correa, Vince Dublino, Alan Parr, and José Arellano.

== Background ==
In 1984 and 1985 the California State University, Los Angeles Music Department and CSULA Associated Students decided to fund LP recordings of the jazz ensemble to better serve as a teaching tool for student music, jazz groups. Diversions is the third of six albums to come from CSULA during the 1980s featuring the award-winning CSULA #1 Jazz Ensemble. The LP contains tracks from the #1 CSULA Jazz Ensemble to include compositions of four students and from the director (professor David Caffey). The group was fortunate enough to have the assistance or both George Stone on piano for the recording and world-class saxophonist Dave Edwards who premiered Charlie Richard's work earlier that academic year.

The LP was entirely written and composed by the students and faculty of CSULA; this being the third LP in a row CSULA had done this.

There has been a tradition of musicians coming from the CSULA program who have worked with major musical acts, on major studio and movie projects, and hold positions in higher education in music. The roster on this album is self-evident as to the diversity and level of student musicians CSULA developed at that time and has for many years dating far back to musicians (graduates) such as Lennie Niehaus and Gabe Baltazar.

== Track listing ==
All tracks are written by various artists listed.

No.	Title	Length
1.	"Diversions (David Caffey)"	8:17
2.	"Ballad For Now (Scott Ackerman)"	5:18
3.	"Vaya! Trombones (José Arellano)"	8:31
4.	"Suite For Jazz Orchestra: Waltz, Ballad, Latin (Charles Richard)"	19:03
5.	"Con Alma (Dizzy Gillespie, arr. Jack Cooper)"	4:11
Total length:		46:12

== Recording Sessions ==
- Recorded: May 16, 17, and 22, 1987, Sage and Sound Recording, Hollywood, California
- Mixing: June 10, 15, 29, 1987, Sage and Sound Recording, Hollywood, California

== Personnel ==
=== Musicians ===
- Conductor: David Caffey
- Saxes and woodwinds: Charlie Richard, Sharon Hirata, Jack Cooper, Scott Ackerman, Randall Willis
- Trumpets and flugelhorns: Simon Austin, Alan Parr, Monty Montgomery, Chris Mauger, Jim Bynum
- Trombones: Gary Smith, Luis Bonilla, Jose Arellano, Rick Acosta
- Tuba: Dr. John Swain
- Guitar: John Taylor
- Piano: George Stone, Robert Gutierrez
- Vibraphone and marimba: Cory Estrada
- Bass: Mark Tavarez
- Drums: Vince Dublino
- Percussion: Eric "Bobo" Correa

=== Production ===
- Recording engineers: Jim Mooney, Bob Kinsey, and Jerry Wood
- Mixing engineers: Jim Mooney and David Caffey
- Mastering: K Disc
- Cover art: Randy Piland
