= Richard Maloof =

American musician (1940–2024)

Richard David Maloof (January 17, 1940 – May 1, 2024) was an American musician who played bass and tuba for the Lawrence Welk orchestra.

== Life and career ==
Richard Maloof was born and raised by Cy and Lucille Maloof, one of four children. Richard graduated from San Juan High School in Citrus Heights, then attended Sacramento State University, Los Angeles City College and UCLA while searching for work as a musician. He got his first break playing for Les Brown's band and later Carmen Cavallaro before joining the U. S. Army.

While stationed at the North American Air Defense Command (NORAD), Richard played in the NORAD Commanders Jazz Band alongside future Welk musicians Johnny Zell and Dave Edwards. During his NORAD stint he got the invitation to join Lawrence Welk, both with the orchestra and on his weekly television show. That was in August 1967 and he remained until the show ended in February 1982. Starting in 1976, he had a mustache as shown on the show.

Maloof also performed music for several television shows such as The Julie Andrews Show and Kojak as well as several commercials and feature films, and performed on stage for the show Forever Plaid. He also served six years with the Los Angeles Pops and also taught music sight and ear training for LA's Musicians Institute.

Maloof married fellow Welk star Mary Lou Metzger on June 16, 1973. They resided in Sherman Oaks, California. Richard Maloof died on May 1, 2024, at the age of 84.

== See also ==
- Richard Maloof at IMDb
