= Morris White =

American jazz musician

Morris Ellis "Fruit" White (January 17, 1911 – November 1986) was an American jazz banjoist and guitarist.

White was born in Nashville and grew up in Peoria, Illinois. He played in the 1920s with Charlie Creath, Dewey Jackson and Ethel Waters before joining The Missourians in 1928. In 1930, Cab Calloway became the leader of the ensemble and White became one of his most important sidemen, and remained with Calloway's band into 1938. He played with Lionel Hampton in 1941, then left the music industry for good.

== General references ==
- Morris White at Allmusic
- Howard Rye, "Morris White". Grove Jazz online
