= The Complete RCA Victor Recordings =

Compilation album by Dizzy Gillespie
- Released: January 24, 1995
- Recorded: May 17, 1937 – July 6, 1949
- Genre: Jazz, bebop, Latin jazz
- Length: 127:35
- Label: Bluebird; 07863 66528-2

The Complete RCA Victor Recordings is a 1995 compilation 2-CD set of sessions led by Jazz trumpeter and composer Dizzy Gillespie recorded for the RCA Victor label between 1937 and 1949.

== Reception ==
Professional ratings
Review scores
| Source | Rating |
|---|---|
| AllMusic | 5/5 stars |
| The Penguin Guide to Jazz | 👑 |
| Tom Hull | A− |

Writing for Allmusic, Richard S. Ginell states: "Although the sheer scope of this double-CD roundup of all of Dizzy's Victor sessions places it most obviously within the evolution of bebop, it is absolutely essential to Latin jazz collections as well".

Music historian and Arts Administrator for the National Endowment for the Arts, A. B. Spellman recommended the album for the NPR Basic Jazz Record Library, stating: "Primarily, I say this for the big band, but that's not all that's on here. You have some very early Dizzy, when he's playing with the Teddy Hill Orchestra or with the Lionel Hampton Orchestra. You have some small group stuff from the 52nd Street time, when he was playing all the clubs there. And you also have a very interesting couple of tunes from the Metronome All-Stars, which put him with a wide array of jazz talents of the period. But, mainly you've got Dizzy Gillespie's Big Band here working, and that's a band that is very important for everybody to know about".

The Penguin Guide to Jazz awarded the compilation a "Crown" signifying a recording that the authors "feel a special admiration or affection for".

== Track listing ==
All compositions by Dizzy Gillespie except where noted.

Disc one

1. "Manteca" (Chano Pozo, Dizzy Gillespie, Gil Fuller) – 3:06
2. "Anthropology" [Take 2] (Charlie Parker, Dizzy Gillespie) – 2:53
3. "King Porter Stomp" (Jelly Roll Morton) – 3:04
4. "Yours and Mine" (Arthur Freed, Nacio Herb Brown) – 2:41
5. "Blue Rhythm Fantasy" (Chappie Willett, Teddy Hill) – 2:42
6. "Hot Mallets" – (Lionel Hampton) – 2:17
7. "52nd Street Theme" [Take 1] (Thelonious Monk) – 3:13
8. "52nd Street Theme" [Take 2] (Monk) – 3:05
9. "A Night in Tunisia" [Take 1] (Dizzy Gillespie, Frank Paparelli) – 3:07
10. "A Night in Tunisia" [Incomplete Take] (Gillespie, Paparelli) – 2:05
11. "Ol' Man Rebop" (Leonard Feather) – 2:44
12. "Anthropology" [Take 1] (Parker, Gillespie) – 2:37
13. "Ow!" – 2:56
14. "Oop-Pop-A-Da" (Babs Gonzales) – 3:12
15. "Two Bass Hit" (Dizzy Gillespie, John Lewis) – 2:56
16. "Stay On It" (Dizzy Gillespie, Tadd Dameron) – 3:13
17. "Algo Bueno (Woody 'n You)" – 2:59
18. "Cool Breeze" (Billy Eckstine, Dizzy Gillespie, Tadd Dameron) – 2:48
19. "Cubana Be" – 2:41
20. "Cubana Bop" – 3:17
21. "Ool-Ya-Koo" (Gillespie, Fuller) – 2:52
22. "Minor Walk" (Gillespie, Linton Garner) – 2:44

Disc two

1. "Good Bait" (Count Basie, Tadd Dameron) – 2:46
2. "Guarachi Guaro" – 3:12
3. "Duff Capers" (Garner) – 3:10
4. "Lover, Come Back to Me" (Oscar Hammerstein II, Sigmund Romberg) – 3:32
5. "I'm Be Boppin' Too" [Take 1] (Lorraine Gillespie) – 2:18
6. "Swedish Suite" (Fuller) – 2:56
7. "St. Louis Blues" (W. C. Handy) – 3:07
8. "I Should Care" (Axel Stordahl, Paul Weston, Sammy Cahn) – 3:03
9. "That Old Black Magic" (Harold Arlen, Johnny Mercer) – 2:40
10. "You Go to My Head" (Haven Gillespie, J. Fred Coots) – 3:01
11. "Jump Did-Le Ba" – 2:28
12. "Dizzier and Dizzier" (Count Basie, Gerald Wilson) – 3:06
13. "I'm Be Boppin' Too" Take 2 (Lorraine Gillespie) – 2:22
14. "Hey Pete! Let's Eat More Meat" (Buster Harding, Dizzy Gillespie, Lester Peterson) – 3:01
15. "Jumpin' with Symphony Sid" (Lester Young) – 3:03
16. "If Love Is Trouble" (George Handy, Jack Segal) – 3:43
17. "In the Land of Oo-Bla-Dee" (Mary Lou Williams, Milt Orent) – 2:36
18. "Overtime" [Shorter Take] (Pete Rugolo) – 3:06
19. "Overtime" [Longer Take] (Pete Rugolo) – 4:31
20. "Victory Ball" [Shorter Take] (Lennie Tristano) – 2:40
21. "Victory Ball" [Longer Take] (Tristano) – 4:12

Notes

- Recorded in New York City on May 17, 1937 (tracks 1–3 to 1–5), September 11, 1939 (track 1–6), February 22, 1946 (tracks 1–2 & 1–7 to 1–12), August 22, 1947 (tracks 1–13 to 1–16), December 22, 1947 (tracks 1–17 to 1–20), December 30, 1947 (Tracks 1-1, 1–21, 1–22 & 2–1), December 29, 1948 (tracks 2–2 to 2–5), January 3, 1949 (tracks 2–18 to 2–21), April 14, 1949 (tracks 2–6 to 2–9), May 6, 1949 (tracks 2–10 to 2–13) and July 6, 1949 (tracks 2–14 to 2–17)

== Personnel ==
- Dizzy Gillespie – trumpet, vocals
- Benny Bailey (tracks: 1-1, 1–17 to 2–1), Benny Harris (tracks: 2–6 to 2–17), Bill Dillard (tracks: 1–3 to 1–5), Dave Burns (tracks: 1-1, 1–13 to 2–5), Elmon Wright (tracks: 1-1, 1–13 to 2–17), Fats Navarro (tracks: 2–18, 2–19, 2–21), Lammar Wright Jr. (tracks: 1-1, 1–17 to 2–1), Matthew McKay (tracks: 1–13 to 1–16), Miles Davis (tracks: 2–18, 2–19, 2–21), Ray Orr (tracks: 1–13 to 1–16), Shad Collins (tracks: 1–3 to 1–5), Willie Cook (tracks: 2–2 to 2–17) – trumpet
- Andy Duryea (tracks: 2–2 to 2–17), William Shepherd (tracks: 1-1, 1–13 to 2–1), Charles Greenlea (tracks: 2–14 to 2–17), Dicky Wells (tracks: 1–3 to 1–5), J. J. Johnson (tracks: 2–14 to 2–19, 2–21), Jesse Tarrant (tracks: 2–2 to 2–13), Kai Winding (tracks: 2–18 to 2–21), Sam Hurt (tracks: 2–2 to 2–13), Taswell Baird (tracks: 1–13 to 1–16), Ted Kelly (tracks: 1-1, 1–17 to 2–1) – trombone
- Buddy DeFranco – clarinet (tracks: 2–18 to 2–21)
- Benny Carter (tracks: 1–6), Charlie Parker (tracks: 2–18 to 2–21), Ernie Henry (tracks: 2–2 to 2–17), Howard Johnson (tracks: 1-1, 1–3 to 1–5, 1–13 to 2–1), John Brown (tracks: 1-1, 1–13 to 2–17), Russell Procope (tracks: 1–3 to 1–5) – alto saxophone
- Ben Webster (tracks: 1–6), Big Nick Nicholas (tracks: 1-1, 1–17 to 2–1), Budd Johnson (tracks: 2–2 to 2–5), Charlie Ventura (tracks: 2–18 to 2–21), Coleman Hawkins (tracks: 1–6), Don Byas (tracks: 1–7 to 1–11), James Moody (tracks: 1–13 to 1–16), Joe Gayles (tracks: 1-1, 1–13 to 2–17), Chu Berry (tracks: 1–6), Robert Carroll (tracks: 1–3 to 1–5), Teddy Hill (tracks: 1–3 to 1–5), Yusef Lateef (tracks: 2–6 to 2–17) – tenor saxophone
- Al Gibson (tracks: 2–6 to 2–17), Cecil Payne (tracks: 1-1, 1–13 to 2–5), Ernie Caceres (tracks: 2–18, 2–19, 2–21) – baritone saxophone
- Bill DeArango (tracks: 1–2, 1–7 to 1–12), Billy Bauer (tracks: 2–18 to 2–21), Charlie Christian (tracks: 1–6), John Collins (tracks: 1–13 to 1–16), John Smith (tracks: 1–3 to 1–5) – guitar
- Al Haig (tracks: 1–2, 1–7 to 1–12), Clyde Hart (tracks: 1–6), James Forman (tracks: 2–2 to 2–17), John Lewis (tracks: 1-1, 1–13 to 2–1), Lennie Tristano (tracks: 2–18 to 2–21), Sam Allen (tracks: 1–3 to 1–5) – piano
- Lionel Hampton (tracks: 1–6), Milt Jackson (tracks: 1–2, 1–7 to 1–16) – vibraphone
- Al McKibbon (tracks: 1-1, 1–17 to 2–17), Eddie Safranski (tracks: 2–18 to 2–21), Milt Hinton (tracks: 1–6), Ray Brown (tracks: 1–2, 1–7 to 1–16), Richard Fullbright (tracks: 1–3 to 1–5) – bass
- Bill Beason (tracks: 1–3 to 1–5), Cozy Cole (tracks: 1–6), J. C. Heard (tracks: 1–2, 1–7 to 1–12), Joe Harris (tracks: 1–13 to 1–16), Kenny Clarke (tracks: 1-1, 1–17 to 2–1), Shelly Manne (tracks: 2–18 to 2–21), Teddy Stewart (tracks: 2–2 to 2–17) – drums
- Chano Pozo – congas, bongos, vocals (tracks: 1-1, 1–17 to 2–1)
- Sabu Martinez – bongos (tracks: 2–2 to 2–5)
- Joe Harris (tracks: 2–2 to 2–5), Vince Guerra (tracks: 2–6 to 2–17) – congas
- Bill Dillard (tracks: 1–4), Joe Carroll (tracks: 2–11, 2–14, 2–17), Johnny Hartman (tracks: 2–8 to 2–10, 2–16), Kenny Hagood (tracks: 1–14, 1–18, 1–21) – vocals
