= Don Stovall =

American jazz musician

Don Stovall (December 12, 1913 – November 20, 1970) was an American jazz alto saxophonist.

Stovall began playing violin as a child before settling on alto. He played in St. Louis, Missouri, with Dewey Jackson and Fate Marable on riverboats in the 1920s, and then played with Eddie Johnson's Crackerjacks in 1932-33. In the 1930s he lived in Buffalo, New York, where he led his own ensemble and played with Lil Armstrong. He moved to New York City in 1939, and played there with Sammy Price, Eddie Durham, and Cootie Williams. Following this he recorded extensively with Red Allen, remaining with him until 1950. He also recorded with Pete Johnson and Snub Mosley over the course of his career, though he never recorded as a leader.

Stovall retired from the music industry in 1950, and spent the remainder of his life working for a telephone company.
