= Little Boy and the Old Man =

Song
- Released: 1953
- Songwriter(s): Wayne Shanklin

"Little Boy and the Old Man" is a song with words and music by Wayne Shanklin, first recorded by Frankie Laine and Jimmy Boyd in 1953.

In 1956, a new version of the song with French lyrics by René Rouzand, "L'Homme et L'Enfant," was used in the soundtrack for the French film of the same name. The French lyrics were subsequently adapted into a third version of the song, "Little Child," released by as well as Eddie Albert and Sondra Lee on Kapp Records in January 1956, their rendition reached number 59 on the Billboard Hot 100 in February 1956. Cab Calloway and his daughter Lael Calloway also released a version on ABC-Paramount which charted at number 62 on the Billboard Hot 100 in February 1956.
