= This Beautiful Life =

Studio album by Big Bad Voodoo Daddy
- Released: October 19, 1999
- Genre: Swing revival
- Length: 52:00
- Label: Coolsville/Interscope

Big Bad Voodoo Daddy chronology
Americana Deluxe (1998)	This Beautiful Life (1999)	Save My Soul (2003)

Professional ratings
Review scores
Source	Rating
AllMusic	3/5 stars
Los Angeles Times	2/4 stars

This Beautiful Life is the third studio album by the swing band Big Bad Voodoo Daddy. It was released in 1999 on Coolsville/Interscope Records.

== Critical reception ==
The Washington Post wrote that the album "borrows not only from swing but even more so from jump-blues and more recent roots-rock to provide a mongrelized, horn-fueled vehicle for Scotty Morris's songs." The Los Angeles Times thought that "there is some predictable, Krupa-esque drumming, and little attempt to push the genre in any new directions."

== Track listing ==
All tracks are written by Scotty Morris, except where noted.

This Beautiful Life track listing
No.	Title	Length
1.	"Big and Bad"	4:15
2.	"I Wanna Be Like You" (Robert and Richard Sherman)	3:40
3.	"Who's That Creepin'"	4:43
4.	"When It Comes to Love"	4:44
5.	"I'm Not Sleepin'"	4:16
6.	"Some Things"	4:39
7.	"What's Next"	3:40
8.	"Big Time Operator"	4:00
9.	"Still in Love With You"	4:30
10.	"2000 Volts"	6:01
11.	"Sleep Tight"	4:31
12.	"Ol' MacDonald"	3:00
Total length:		52:00

== Personnel ==
- Scotty Morris - vocals, guitar
- Karl Hunter - clarinet, soprano saxophone, tenor saxophone
- Andy Rowley - baritone saxophone, background vocals
- Glen "The Kid" Marhevka - trumpet, cornet
- Joshua Levy - piano
- Dirk Shumaker - acoustic bass, background vocals
- Kurt Sodergren - drums

== Technical ==
- Michael Frondelli - coproducer, engineer, mixing
- Brad Benedict - coproducer, engineer, mixing
- Tom Peterson - horn arranger

== Charts ==
Chart performance for This Beautiful Life
Chart (1999)	Peak position
US Billboard 200	93
