= Johnny Zell =

American trumpet player (born 1947)

- Born: November 24, 1947 (age 78); Fort Benning, Georgia, U.S.
- Occupation: Musician (trumpeter)
- Instrument: Trumpet

Johnathan Zell (born November 24, 1947) is an American musician, best known as a trumpeter from The Lawrence Welk Show, a musical, variety-show television series.

== Early life and education ==
Zell was born at Fort Benning, a United States Army post located southeast of the city of Columbus, Georgia.

While growing up in Los Angeles, California, he began studying music at an early age, starting first with the violin and later moving on to the trumpet.

His first attempt to audition for Lawrence Welk came when Zell was thirteen years old. Welk's orchestra was playing at the Hollywood Palladium and when he asked if he could play a trumpet solo for him, Welk, although impressed with his talent and moxie, thought that he was too young but told him to see him again when he was a bit older and had more experience.

== Career ==
After completing high school, Zell played for the Freddy Martin and Russ Morgan bands before he got his draft notice. He served in the army from 1965 to 1968.

During his time in the army, he played for the North American Aerospace Defense Command (NORAD) band known as The Commanders along with Dave Edwards and Richard Maloof, future Welk musicians.

In early 1968, while with the NORAD band, Zell had a second chance to audition for Welk. Zell was asked to do a television commercial for U.S. Army recruiting and part of the job was to do an interview for the Welk show and to play trumpet for the band. After his performance on that show, Welk hired him into the band upon his completion of his military service which was nine months away.

From 1968 until the television series ended in 1982, Zell was one of The Lawrence Welk Show's most popular musicians and was often featured in trumpet solos, including "At the Cross", "Hot Lips" and "A String of Pearls".

Zell was the protégé of Welk trumpet great Norman Bailey, who gave Zell one of his trumpets, made of gold.

As a born-again Christian, he was also involved in gospel ministry, pursuing both Christian and secular music, doing many concert dates and making albums. Later in life, Johnny became pastor of The Church of New Beginnings in Pacific City, Oregon, a position he held for over 17 years.

== Personal life ==
He is the father of two children.

== See also ==
- The Lawrence Welk Show
