= Watchu' Want for Christmas? =

EP by Big Bad Voodoo Daddy
- Released: 1995
- Genre: Swing revival; Christmas
- Label: Big Bad Records

Big Bad Voodoo Daddy chronology
Big Bad Voodoo Daddy (1994)	Watchu' Want for Christmas? (1995)	Americana Deluxe (1998)

Watchu' Want for Christmas? is an EP (and first Christmas album) by swing revival group Big Bad Voodoo Daddy. It was released in 1995. The three Christmas songs also appear on the band's 2004 album Everything You Want for Christmas.

== Track listing ==
1. "Rock-a-Billy Christmas"
2. "You & Me & The Bottle Makes 3 Tonight (Baby)"
3. "'Zat You Santa Claus"
4. "I Wan'na Be Like You (The Monkey Song)"
5. "Christmastime in Tinseltown (Again)"
6. "Go-Daddy-O"
