= Dave Edwards (musician) =

- Dave Edwards; Alto Saxophone; The Lawrence Welk Show, 1973

Background information
- Born: David W. Edwards; January 11, 1941
- Origin: Opelika, Alabama
- Died: August 12, 2000 (aged 59) Orlando, Florida
- Genres: Big Band; Cool jazz West Coast jazz
- Occupation: Multireedist
- Instruments: Saxophones; Clarinets; Flutes
- Years active: 1958-2000
- Labels: Columbia; Concord
- Website
- Military service
- Allegiance: United States
- Branch: United States Army
- Service years: 1965–1968
- Unit: NORAD Joint Forces Band

Dave Edwards (January 11, 1941 – August 12, 2000) was an American big band-style musician who most notably was the lead alto saxophonist and multireedist for the long running weekly television series, The Lawrence Welk Show from 1968 through 1979.

== Early life, education, and growing up in Alabama ==
Born in Opelika, Alabama, and reared in Tuskegee, he later moved with his family to Fairhope, Alabama. He attended Auburn University in Auburn, Alabama, where he played the saxophone and reeds (Multireedist) with The Auburn Knights Orchestra; Edwards would later try to complete his education at California State University, Los Angeles during the late-1980s while residing in Burbank. Out of school early from Auburn University (having played with The Auburn Knights Orchestra and singer Toni Tennille) he would play on the road with Richard Maltby and then with the Glenn Miller Orchestra before being drafted into the United States Army and stationed with the NORAD band in Colorado Springs, CO.

== Armed Forces and NORAD band ==
While stationed at the North American Air Defense Command (NORAD) during the 1960s, Dave Edwards would serve in the United States Army and play in the American/Canadian, joint armed serves NORAD Commanders Jazz Band alongside future Lawrence Welk Show musicians Richard Maloof and Johnny Zell. Stationed in Colorado Springs, this unit became one of the elite musical groups of the armed forces during the Cold War/Vietnam era due to the plethora of talented, young musicians being drafted into military service. Edwards would first meet longtime musical associates Dave Wolpe, Warren Luening, Bob Payne, and Larry Ford while stationed at Colorado Springs. He toured extensively with the NORAD musical groups to include appearances at Carnegie Hall (May 1966), the Hollywood Bowl and Disneyland (September 1966), Expo '67 - Montreal World's Fair, the Canadian National Exhibition in Toronto, Ontario, Canada (August and September 1967), the CBS The Mike Douglas Show, the Today Show, and NBC's The Tonight Show Starring Johnny Carson.

== The Lawrence Welk Show 1968-1979 ==
After being discharged from the Army, he moved to Los Angeles and joined the Lawrence Welk Show orchestra in early 1968. In his first season with the show he replaced Mahlon Clark on 2nd alto sax in the reed section and then moved later to playing the lead alto/reed chair with Russ Klein moving to tenor. Edwards performed on The Lawrence Show while it was carried on ABC-TV (up to 1971) and then in syndication; he left in 1979, when he was replaced by reedman Skeets Herfurt. The sax/reed section for The Lawrence Welk Show would finally be settled into having Edwards-lead alto/Section Leader, Bob Davis-2nd Alto Sax/lead Flute/Piccolo, Henry Cuesta-2nd tenor/clarinet soloist, Russ Klein- lead tenor sax, and Dick Dale- baritone/bass clarinet. During this time Edwards proved to be one of the finest lead alto players for big bands and orchestras of a generation being able to fit any style, display incredible consistency, and having total command of playing lead piccolo/flute/clarinet/soprano sax/alto sax or even the oboe. The schedule for rehearsing and taping the show was rigid, constant, and sometimes hectic; the musicians were expected to play almost exclusively for the Welk television production rehearsals plus live taping (with studio audience) every week at the Hollywood Palladium from 1968 to 1976, 1976-77 at the Hollywood Palace, and CBS Television City from 1977 to 1979.

== Later professional work and style ==
Edwards was prominent on movie and T.V. soundtracks on shows such as the ABC Captain & Tennille Variety Hour; he is most well known for playing the credits theme (soprano saxophone) for the 1980s T.V. show Moonlighting. During this time he lived in Burbank, CA near NBC Studios. While working in Los Angeles during the late 1960s, 1970s and 1980s Edwards played and recorded with a wide range of artists to include Ernestine Anderson, Nat Pierce, Roger Neumann, Frank Capp, Frank Sinatra Jr. and Madeline Vergari. Though his musical style could readily transform to the many venues or artists he played with, Edwards' personal saxophone playing was most heavily influenced by the alto saxophonists Charlie Parker and Cannonball Adderley. This style was much better shown when Edwards had the rare opportunity to be featured (at length) in 1987 on the premiere of Charlie Richard's Suite for Alto Sax and Jazz Orchestra.

Edwards later relocated in the 1990s to the Orlando, Florida region (with his wife Phyllis and sons David and Charles) and continued to work for Walt Disney World, several bands locally, and across the country. Edwards commented on the need to move away from the difficulties of living in the Los Angeles area and wanted to relocate back to the South.

Edwards died suddenly on August 12, 2000, of cardiac arrest at the age of 59.

== Select discography ==
- 1959: The Legend Of Bix, Metropolitan Jazz Octet (Argo Records)
- 1966: The NORAD COMMANDERS, The NORAD Commanders Jazz Band (Columbia Records special issue)
- 1977: Music from New York, New York, Bill Tole
- 1977: Come in from the Rain, Captain and Tennille (A&M Records)
- 1987: In the Mood (original movie soundtrack)
- 1987: Live at the Alley Cat, Frank Capp
- 1994: Here's That Swing Thing, Pat Longo
- 1994: Don't Stop Now, Louie Bellson
- 1995: This Is My Lucky Day, Madeline Vergari
- 2013: Hot Nights/Ready for Your Love, Buddy Greco

== Bibliography ==
- Edwards, Dave. Alabama Music Office, 4810 Watermelon Road, Northport, AL 35473, Copyright © 2011
- Fuqua, C. S. Dave Edwards Alabama Musicians: Musical Heritage from the Heart of Dixie The History Press. 2011.
