= Norman Bailey (musician) =

American musician

- Born: February 6, 1913
- Died: July 11, 1984
- Genres: Jazz
- Occupations: Musician, composer
- Instrument: Trumpet
- Years active: 1926–1973

Norman Bailey (February 6, 1913 – July 11, 1984) was an American musician who was a member of the Lawrence Welk orchestra from 1952 to 1973.

Born in Worcester, Massachusetts; he took up music with his instrument of choice, the trumpet. He joined the Welk band in 1951 after spending seventeen years with the Freddy Martin band. Some of his most notable solo numbers during his tenure on the show include Sugar Blues and Hot Lips, he also gave one of his trumpets to one of his protégés Johnny Zell, who later became a member of the Welk orchestra.
