= Lammar Wright Sr. =

American jazz trumpeter (1907–1973)

Lammar Wright (June 20, 1907 – April 13, 1973) was an American jazz trumpeter.

== Biography ==
Wright was born in Texarkana, Texas, and grew up in Kansas City, where he played with Bennie Moten's band in 1923. He relocated to New York City in 1927 to play with The Missourians, staying with the group after Cab Calloway became its leader. Wright remained Calloway's lead trumpeter until 1942 and continued playing with him sporadically through the rest of the 1940s. Wright also played with Don Redman (1943), Claude Hopkins (1944–1946), Cootie Williams (1944), Lucky Millinder (1946–1952), Sy Oliver (1947), and Louis Armstrong. He led his own groups from time to time.

In the 1950s and 1960s he taught music and worked as a studio musician, in addition to recording with Arnett Cobb (1951), Count Basie (1951), the Sauter-Finegan Orchestra (1957), and George Shearing (1959). He has a role in the 1968 film The Night They Raided Minsky's.

Both of Wright's sons, Lammar Wright Jr. and Elmon Wright, became trumpeters as well.

He died in Manhattan, New York City.
