= Monstrosity! =

Studio album by California State University, Los Angeles Jazz Ensemble
- Released: 1988
- Recorded: Sage and Sound Recording; Hollywood, California
- Genre: Jazz, Big band, instrumental
- Label: H D C Music Publications
- Producer: David Caffey and Scott Ackerman

California State University, Los Angeles Jazz Ensemble chronology
Diversions (1987)	Monstrosity! (1988)	It's About Time (1990)
- cat. # CSULA 888

Monstrosity! is the final LP Vinyl album release by the California State University, Los Angeles Jazz Ensemble before recording on digital/CD format in 1990. In addition to the big band, the LP featured the CSULA Jazz Quintet which won the Pacific Coast Collegiate Jazz Festival Combo division for 1988. Los Angeles Times jazz critic Zan Stewart gave the recording four of five stars in his May 1989 review. The jazz band had numerous student musicians that have made a name for themselves as professionals including Sharon Hirata, Luis Bonilla, Jack Cooper, Charlie Richard, Corey Gemme, Eric "Bobo" Correa, Vince Dublino, Alan Parr, Paul De Castro, Alex Henderson, Gary Smith and José Arellano.

== Background ==
In 1984 and 1985, the California State University, Los Angeles Music Department, and CSULA Associated Students decided to fund LP recordings of the jazz ensemble to better serve as a teaching tool for student music jazz groups. Monstrosity is the fourth of six albums to come from CSULA during the 1980s featuring the award-winning CSULA #1 Jazz Ensemble. The LP contains tracks from the #1 CSULA Jazz Ensemble to include compositions of four students and from the director (professor David Caffey).

The qualities of the LP that set it apart from numerous university jazz records of that era is the fact it was entirely written, composed, and copied (music also professionally copied by student Sharon Hirata) by the students and faculty of CSULA at a higher level than was usual of students at that time; also this being the fourth LP in a row CSULA had done this. There has been a consistent tradition of musicians coming from the CSULA program who have worked with major musical acts, on major studio and movie projects, and hold positions in higher education in music. The roster on this album is self-evident as to the diversity and level of student musicians CSULA developed at that time and has for many years dating far back to musicians (graduates) such as Lennie Niehaus and Gabe Baltazar.

== Track listing ==
No.	Title	Writer(s)	Length
1.	"Monstrosity!"	José Arellano	5:44
2.	"Karen and Norman"	Jack Cooper	7:20
3.	"Evening Thoughts"	José Arellano	4:54
4.	"Tasha's Revenge"	Scott Ackerman	6:42
5.	"Samba De Linda"	David Caffey	6:55
6.	"Pressing the Issue - (CSULA Jazz Quintet) -"	Mulgrew Miller	7:43
7.	"Blues for Wood"	Woody Shaw, arr. Luis Bonilla	7:10
Total length:			44:65

== Recording sessions ==
- Recorded: May 22, 28 and June 4, 1988 Sage and Sound Recording, Hollywood, California
- Mixing: September 1 and October 1, 1988 Sage and Sound Recording, Hollywood, California

== Personnel ==
=== Musicians ===
- Conductor: David Caffey
- Saxes and woodwinds: Sharon Hirata, David Quillen, Jack Cooper, Scott Ackerman, Randall Willis
- Trumpets and flugelhorns: Barry Parr, Alan Parr, Corey Gemme, Albert Balderas, Chris Mauger
- Trombones: Gary Smith, Luis Bonilla, José Arellano, Alex Henderson
- Piano: Paul De Castro
- Vibraphone and marimba: Cory Estrada
- Bass: Ruben Ramos
- Drums: Vince Dublino and Marc Guité
- Percussion: Eric "Bobo" Correa

=== Production ===
- Recording engineers: Jim Mooney and Jerry Wood
- Mixing engineers: Jim Mooney and David Caffey
- Mastering: David Travis, KM Recording Services
- Cover photo: Stan Carstenson, CSULA Creative Media Services
- Jacket design: Scott Ackerman, Sandra Fuentes, David McNutt, CSULA Creative Media Services

== Reception ==
Professional ratings
Review scores
Source	Rating
Los Angeles Times	4/5 stars

"(Monstrosity!) finds the first-rate Cal State Los Angeles Jazz Ensemble tearing through a handful of vital originals--Jose Arellano's title track and director David Caffey's "Samba de Linda" among them and a couple of Woody Shaw cookers. Solid solos from the likes of saxophonists Sharon Hirata and Randall Willis and trombonists Luis Bonilla and Gary Smith abound..."

—Zan Stewart, The Los Angeles Times
