= Sammy Price =

American jazz, boogie-woogie and blues pianist and bandleader (1908–1992)

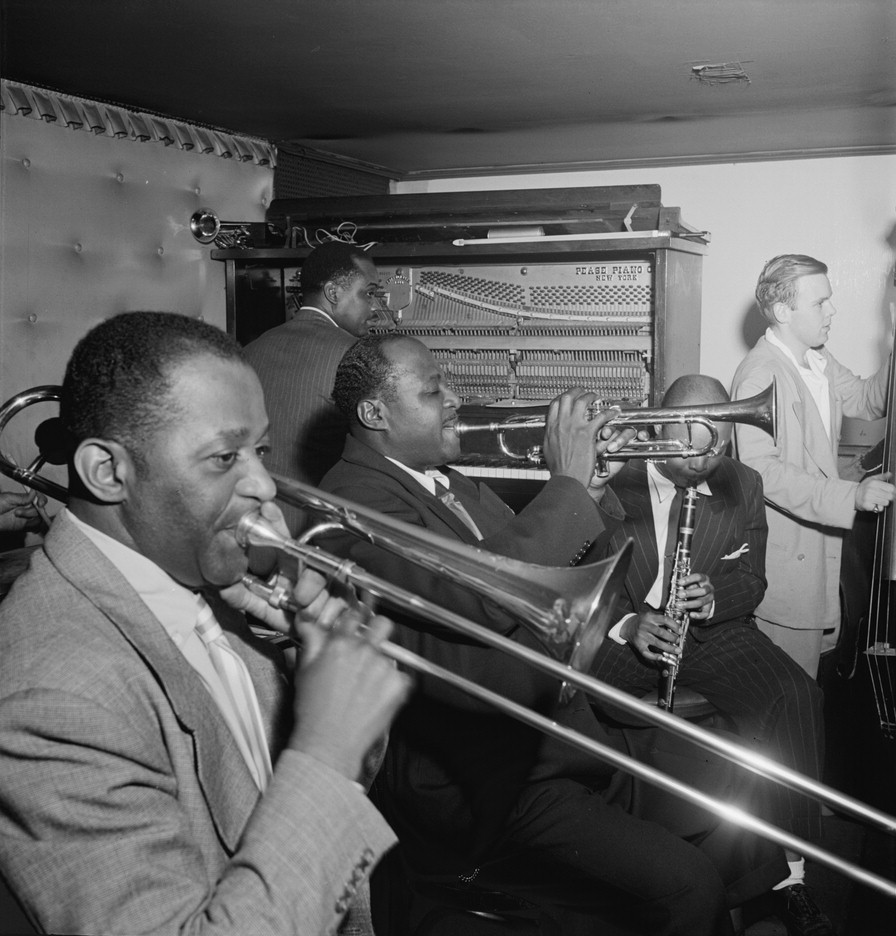
- Price (background) with Wilbur De Paris (left), Sidney De Paris, Eddie Barefield and Charlie Traeger, Jimmy Ryan's (Club), New York, c. July 1947. Photograph by William P. Gottlieb.

Background information
- Born: Samuel Blythe Price; October 6, 1908; Honey Grove, Texas, United States
- Died: April 14, 1992 (aged 83) New York City, United States
- Genres: Jazz, jump blues
- Occupations: Musician, dancer
- Instruments: Piano, vocals

Samuel Blythe Price (October 6, 1908 – April 14, 1992) was an American jazz, boogie-woogie and jump blues pianist and bandleader. Price's playing is dark, mellow, and relaxed rather than percussive, and he was a specialist at creating the appropriate mood and swing for blues and rhythm and blues recordings.

== Life and career ==
Price was born in Honey Grove, Texas, United States. Price formally studied the piano with Booker T. Washington's daughter, Portia Marshall Washington (1883–1978). In the mid-1920s, when he was employed in a Dallas music store, Price wrote to Paramount Records recommending Blind Lemon Jefferson to the label.

During his early career, he was a singer and dancer in local venues in the Dallas area. Price lived and played jazz in Kansas City, Chicago and Detroit. In 1938 he was hired by Decca Records as a session sideman on piano, assisting singers such as Trixie Smith and Sister Rosetta Tharpe. Price's trio accompanied Rosetta Tharpe and Marie Knight on many of their gospel recordings such as "Up Above My Head" and "Two Little Fishes and Five Loaves of Bread."

Price was known for his work with his own band, known as the Texas Bluesicians (recorded by Decca), that included fellow musicians Don Stovall and Emmett Berry. He was the accompanist on countless recording sessions for the Decca blues, race, and rhythm-and-blues catalogs, and featuring such singers as Trixie Smith ("Trixie Blues"), Blue Lu Barker ("Georgia Grind"), and Cousin Joe ("Box Car Shorty"). Price recorded under his own name, with gospel singers (Rosetta Tharpe, Evelyn Knight) and with Lester Young, toured Europe with Jimmy Rushing, appeared at many jazz festivals, and performed in a Broadway play starring Tallulah Bankhead (Clash By Night). Price also had a decade-long partnership with Henry "Red" Allen.

Beginning in 1943, Price was a blues and boogie-woogie pianist at the Café Society Uptown nightclub owned by Barney Josephson. He often appeared on a program with Art Tatum. Later, in the 1970s, Price played at Barney Josephson's restaurant, the Cookery. Initially, he played Sunday nights while Mary Lou Williams played during the week.

In 1955–1956, Price led a band touring France, Spain, Portugal and Tunisia, playing more than 90 concerts, under the auspices of the French national program "Les Jeunesses musicales de France", the first jazz group to appear in the program to bring music to young people.

During the 1960s and 1970s, he was an activist in civil rights and on behalf of the homeless. In Harlem, he organized for the campaigns of Congressman Adam Clayton Powell Jr., President Lyndon Johnson and Senator Robert F. Kennedy. From 1965 to 1978, Price served in many capacities with the Haryou-Act antipoverty program, notably as Director of Neighborhood Board #2 in Central Harlem, and as chairman of the Board of the Arts and Culture pre-vocational program.

In the 1970s and 1980s, Price was a mainstay at the West End Bar on Broadway near Columbia University, working in a longstanding program of jazz produced by Phil Schaap.

Later in his life, Price partnered with the Roosevelt Hotel in New York City, and was the headline entertainment at the Crawdaddy Restaurant, a New Orleans themed restaurant in New York in the mid-1970s. Both Benny Goodman and Buddy Rich played with Price at this venue. In a lighthearted ceremony at the Crawdaddy in 1977, the pianist Eubie Blake crowned Price as the King of Boogie-Woogie. In the 1980s, he switched to playing in the bar of Boston's Copley Plaza. In the 1990s, Price played at the Blue Note jazz club and appeared in a folk masters program at Carnegie Hall.

He died of a heart attack in April 1992, at home in Harlem, in New York City, at the age of 83.

== Songs ==
- "The Goon Drag"
