= Minnie the Moocher =

1931 song by Cab Calloway

Single by Cab Calloway
- Released: 1931
- Recorded: March 3, 1931, New York City
- Genre: Jazz
- Length: 3:00
- Label: Brunswick; BR6074
- Songwriters: Cab Calloway, Irving Mills, Clarence Gaskill

Original 1931 recording
- "Minnie the Moocher" on YouTube

"Minnie the Moocher" is a jazz song written by American musicians Cab Calloway and Irving Mills, and first recorded in 1931 by Calloway and his swing orchestra. Famous for its nonsensical ad libbed lyrics and scat singing—particularly its refrain of "Hi de hi de hi de ho"—the song became one of the most recognizable recordings in American jazz history. In performances, Calloway would have the audience and band members participate by repeating each scat phrase in a form of call and response.

== Composition and lyrics ==
Employing period slang, the song describes Minnie as a moocher, meaning a person who exploits the generosity of others (Note: Merriam-Webster defines moocher as "one who exploits the generosity of others : a person who mooches off others") or a petty thief. (Note: Green's Dictionary of Slang defines moocher as a petty thief or a person who exploits the generosity of others.) She is further described as a "red hot hoochie coocher", a performer of the hoochie coochie dance, and more broadly understood as a sexually promiscuous woman, (Note: Green's Dictionary of Slang defines hoochie coocher as a performer of the hoochie coochie dance, with broader connotations of sexual promiscuity.) and as a frail, meaning prostitute. (Note: Green's Dictionary of Slang defines frail as a prostitute.) Minnie's bloke, (Note: Green's Dictionary of Slang defines bloke as a man) Smokey, is described as cokie, a slang term for a user of cocaine, (Note: Green's Dictionary of Slang defines cokie as a user of cocaine.) while the phrase "kick the gong around" was slang for drug use especially opium, heroin or morphine. (Note: Green's Dictionary of Slang defines "kick the gong around" as slang for drug use, especially opium, heroin, or morphine.)

The song's central narrative is a cautionary tale centered on Minnie's drug-induced dreams of gaudy wealth and luxury—being gifted a gold home, a diamond car, racehorses, and endless multi-course banquets—but revealing that Minnie, even with unlimited fantasy, chose to obsessively recount a million dollars in small change. It ends with the lament: "Poor Min!"

According to Calloway's autobiography, the song's famous "Ho-de-ho" refrain originated during a live radio broadcast at Harlem's Cotton Club in 1931 when he forgot the lyrics and improvised the phrase, then invited the audience to repeat it back. 'They hollered back and nearly brought the roof down.'

It is based lyrically on Frankie "Half-Pint" Jaxon's 1927 version of the early twentieth-century vaudeville song "Willie the Weeper", a version of which is performed by Bette Davis in The Cabin in the Cotton.

== Recordings and performances ==
In addition to the 1931 recording, Calloway recorded multiple versions of the song in then-contemporary styles. For example, in 1953 he recorded a big band version with expurgated drug references for Bell Records, and in 1978 he recorded a disco version with drug references restored and enhanced with sniffing sound effects. In the 1980 comedy film The Blues Brothers, Calloway performed the song and also played a supporting role.

=== Cover versions ===
"Minnie the Moocher" has been covered or simply referenced by many other performers. Its refrain, particularly the call and response, is part of the language of American jazz.

In 1967, the song was covered by Australian band the Cherokees. A version by the Reggae Philharmonic Orchestra made number 35 on the UK Singles Chart late in 1988.

Commander Cody and His Lost Planet Airmen included a cover of Minnie the Moocher on their 1975 album, Tales from the Ozone.

L.A.-based new wave/rock band Oingo Boingo covered the song during live performances throughout their career, dating back to their years as Mystic Knights of the Oingo Boingo. In 1990, Hugh Laurie performed a part of the song in the first episode of the British comedy television series Jeeves and Wooster, playing the role of Bertie Wooster, duetting with Reginald Jeeves, played by Stephen Fry; a recording was later released on the Jeeves and Wooster soundtrack.

In 1992, rapper Positive K recorded a song called "Minnie the Moocher" for his album The Skills Dat Pay da Bills. Tupac Shakur and Chopmaster J made a hip hop version of the song in 1989, later released on Beginnings: The Lost Tapes 1988–1991 in 2007. Contemporary swing band Big Bad Voodoo Daddy recorded a cover on their 1998 album, Americana Deluxe.

On January 19, 2001, Wyclef Jean opened his All Star Jam @ Carnegie Hall concert with this number, walking to the stage from the back of the audience, dressed in all white like Calloway's preferred white suit for performing. During a performance on the first season of American Idol (2002), Tamyra Gray performed the song on "Big Band" night. In a 2006 interview on The Tonight Show with Jay Leno, Hugh Laurie stated that his charity cover band, Band from TV, has the most popular recording of "Minnie the Moocher" available on the iTunes Store.

In 2009, Big Bad Voodoo Daddy covered the song again on their Calloway tribute album, How Big Can You Get?: The Music of Cab Calloway. The song "The Mighty O" by Outkast is also heavily inspired by "Minnie the Moocher".

English singer Robbie Williams performed "Minnie the Moocher" on the Take the Crown Stadium Tour (2013), changing the lyrics to be about himself as a tongue-in-cheek response to lighthearted criticism of his tendency to engage audiences in call and response. He then released a studio recording on his tenth studio album, Robbie Williams Swings Both Ways (2013).

== Reception and legacy ==
First released by Brunswick Records, the song was the first jazz record to sell over one million copies and was the biggest chart-topper of 1931. Calloway publicized and then celebrated a "12th birthday" for the song on June 17, 1943, while performing at New York's Strand Theatre, reporting he was singing it at the beginning and end of four performances daily and estimating he had sung it more than 40,000 times.

In 1978, Calloway's disco version reached No. 91 on the Billboard R&B chart.

Calloway's 1980 performance of the song in the comedy film The Blues Brothers, in which he also played a supporting role, introduced "Minnie the Moocher" to a new generation of listeners.

"Minnie the Moocher" was inducted into the Grammy Hall of Fame in 1999, and in 2019 was selected for preservation in the National Recording Registry as "culturally, historically, or aesthetically significant" by the Library of Congress.

At the Cab Calloway School of the Arts, which is named after the singer, students perform "Minnie the Moocher" as a traditional part of talent showcases.

The composition will enter the American public domain on January 1, 2027. (Note: The copyright was originally registered on April 7, 1931 (EP22824) and renewed on March 27, 1959 (R2344240). Under the Copyright Act's 95-year term for works published with notice before 1978, the composition enters the public domain in the United States on January 1, 2027.)
