= Americana Deluxe =

Studio album by Big Bad Voodoo Daddy
- Released: February 24, 1998
- Recorded: Capitol Studios B&C
- Genre: Swing revival
- Length: 54:21
- Label: Interscope

Big Bad Voodoo Daddy chronology
Watchu' Want for Christmas? (1997)	Americana Deluxe (1998)	This Beautiful Life (1999)

Singles from Americana Deluxe
- 1. "You and Me and the Bottle Makes 3 Tonight (Baby)" Released: 1998

Professional ratings
Review scores
Source	Rating
AllMusic	3/5 stars

Americana Deluxe is the second studio album by Big Bad Voodoo Daddy. This album is sometimes called Big Bad Voodoo Daddy, as the album cover prominently displays a stylized "Big Bad Voodoo Daddy" logo and does not feature the phrase "Americana Deluxe". The liner notes and the band's website have the title Americana Deluxe.

== Track listing ==
All tracks are written by Scotty Morris, except where noted.

Americana Deluxe track listing
No.	Title	Length
1.	"The Boogie Bumper"	3:38
2.	"Mr. Pinstripe Suit"	3:37
3.	"King of Swing"	4:58
4.	"Minnie the Moocher" (Cab Calloway, Irving Mills)	4:42
5.	"You and Me and the Bottle Makes 3 Tonight" (Baby)	3:34
6.	"Jump with My Baby"	6:09
7.	"Maddest Kind of Love"	5:04
8.	"Go Daddy-O"	3:12
9.	"Please Baby"	4:59
10.	"Mambo Swing"	5:07
11.	"Jumpin' Jack"	4:47
12.	"So Long-Farewell-Goodbye"	4:34
Total length:		54:21

"The Boogie Bumper" incorporates a passage from "The Sailor's Hornpipe," a traditional hornpipe melody.

"You and Me and the Bottle Makes 3 Tonight (Baby)" incorporates a passage from the waltz "Sobre las Olas" by Juventino Rosas.

"Jumpin' Jack" includes a portion of "It Don't Mean a Thing (If It Ain't Got That Swing)" by Duke Ellington and Irving Mills.

== Personnel ==
- Jeff Harris – trombone
- Karl Hunter – clarinet, alto/tenor/baritone saxophone
- Joshua Levy – piano, vocals
- Glen "The Kid" Markevka – trumpet, vocals
- Scotty Morris – guitar, vocals, producer, package concept
- Andy "Lucious" Rowley – tenor/baritone saxophone, vocals, art direction, design
- Dirk Shumaker – bass, vocals, double bass
- Kurt Sodergren – percussion, drums, gong

== Technical ==
- Michael Frondelli - coproducer, engineer, mixing
- Brad Benedict - coproducer, art direction
- Tom Peterson - horn arranger
