= Jones and Collins Astoria Hot Eight =

The Jones and Collins Astoria Hot Eight were an American jazz band.

The Jones and Collins Astoria Hot Eight were led by cornetist Lee Collins and tenor saxophonist David Jones. They took their name from the "Astoria Gardens" the dance hall room of the Astoria Hotel on Rampart Street in New Orleans where they were the house band in 1928 and 1929. The group included a number of noted New Orleans jazz musicians in its relatively short life.

The ensemble recorded only once, doing a session at the Italian Hall in New Orleans on November 15, 1929 [some sources list December 15, 1929]. A total of four sides were released from these sessions: "Astoria Strut" b/w "Duet Stomp", issued on Victor Records, and "Damp Weather" b/w "Tip Easy Blues", issued on Bluebird Records. Alternative takes of Damp Weather and Tip Easy Blues survived to appear on reissues decades later.

== Members ==
- Lee Collins - cornet
- David Jones - tenor saxophone
- Nat Story - trombone (does not play on the recording)
- Big Eye Louis Nelson - clarinet (does not play on the recording)
- Sidney Arodin - clarinet; substituting for Nelson on the recording session.
- Theodore Purnell - alto saxophone
- Joseph Robichaux - piano
- Emanuel Sayles - banjo
- Al Morgan - double bass
- Joe Strode (Joe Stouger) - drums
