= Andrew Brown (musician) =

American jazz musician

- Born: February 2, 1900
- Died: August 1960 (aged 59–60)
- Genre: Jazz
- Instruments: Clarinet; Bass Saxophone; Alto Saxophone; Tenor Saxophone
- Years active: 1920s-1940s

Andrew Brown, sometimes given as Andy Brown, (February 2, 1900 – August 1960) was an American jazz reedist. He played clarinet, bass saxophone, alto saxophone, and tenor saxophone, and is best known for his longtime association with Cab Calloway.

Early in the 1920s, Brown worked in the bands of P.B. Langford and Wilson Robinson. He was a member of the house band at Harlem's Cotton Club starting in 1925. This group eventually came to be known as the Missourians under bandleader Andrew Preer; by the end of the 1920s, Cab Calloway had taken leadership of it. Brown played in Calloway's band until 1945, including on many recording sessions and a tour of Europe in 1934. He appeared alongside Calloway as a performer in sound films including Hi-De-Ho (1937), Blues in the Night (1942), and Minnie the Moocher (1942). In the late 1940s Brown ran a music education studio in New York.
