= Dewey Jackson =

American jazz trumpeter and cornetist (1900–1994)

- Born: June 21, 1900; St. Louis, Missouri, U.S.
- Died: January 1, 1994 (aged 93) St. Louis, Missouri, U.S.
- Genres: Jazz
- Instruments: Cornet, trumpet

Dewey Jackson (June 21, 1900 – January 1, 1994) was an American jazz trumpeter and cornetist.

== Early life ==
Jackson was a native of St. Louis, Missouri.

== Career ==
Jackson began playing professionally at an early age, with the Odd Fellows Boys' Band (1912), Tommy Evans (1916–17), and George Reynolds's Keystone Band. He played with Charlie Creath on riverboats, then led his Golden Melody Band from 1920 to 1923. In 1926, he performed with his St. Louis Charleston Peacock Band on the Streckfus Steamboat Lines' steamer Capitol.

He continued to be a regular performer on riverboats into the early 1940s, heading his groups and working as a sideman for Creath and Fate Marable. He was briefly away from boats in 1926 when he played for four months with Andrew Preer at the Cotton Club in New York City. From 1937 to 1941, Jackson led the Dewey Jackson's Musical Ambassadors on riverboats but also led bands on land.

Jackson played little in the 1940s but returned to work in the 1950s with Singleton Palmer and Don Ewell. He recorded four sides as a leader in 1926. The album Live at the Barrel, 1952 with 10 tracks on the Delmark label was released in 2006. Among his sidemen were Pops Foster, Willie Humphrey, Don Stovall, Morris White, Albert Snaer, William Thornton Blue, and Clark Terry.

== Sources ==
- Scott Yanow, Dewey Jackson at Allmusic
