= Lammar Wright Jr. =

American jazz musician

Lammar Wright Jr. (September 26, 1924 – July 8, 1983) was an American jazz trumpeter. He was born in Kansas City, Missouri, the son of trumpeter Lammar Wright Sr., and died in Los Angeles.

Wright's credits are not always clear because many records do not append the suffix "Jr." or "Sr." to the player's name. Furthermore, father and son would sometimes substitute for each other on some recordings. Lammar Wright Jr. worked with Lionel Hampton from 1943 to 1946, then followed with stints in Dizzy Gillespie's band (1947) and as the principal soloist for Charlie Barnet.

== Discography ==
With Dizzy Gillespie

- The Complete RCA Victor Recordings (Bluebird, 1937-1949, [1995])
