= Everything You Want for Christmas =

Studio album by Big Bad Voodoo Daddy
- Released: 2004
- Genre: Swing revival; Christmas
- Length: 37:54
- Label: Vanguard Records
- Producer: Big Bad Voodoo Daddy

Big Bad Voodoo Daddy chronology
Save My Soul (2003)	Everything You Want for Christmas (2004)	How Big Can You Get? (2009)

Professional ratings
Review scores
Source	Rating
AllMusic	3/5 stars

Everything You Want for Christmas is the fifth studio album by Big Bad Voodoo Daddy. "Rockabilly Christmas", "Is Zat' You Santa Claus?", and "Christmastime in Tinseltown" previously appeared on the band's first EP, 1997's Watchu' Want for Christmas?.

== Track listing ==
All songs written by Scotty Morris, except where noted.

1. Rockabilly Christmas - 3:26
2. Merry Christmas Baby (Lou Baxter, Johnny Moore) - 3:03
3. Mr. Heatmiser (Maury Laws, Jules Bass) - 4:22
4. Blue Christmas (Bill Hayes, Jay Johnson) - 3:55
5. Last Night (I Went Out with Santa Claus) - 3:48
6. Christmastime in Tinseltown - 4:32
7. A Party for Santa (Robert Nelson) - 2:52
8. Jingle Bells (Cha Cha) (James Pierpont) - 3:27
9. Is Zat' You Santa Claus? (Jack Fox) - 3:18
10. We Three Kings (John Henry Hopkins Jr.) - 3:00
11. Jingle Bells (Salsa Funk Version) (Hidden track) - 2:11

== Personnel ==
Big Bad Voodoo Daddy

- Scotty Morris - vocals, guitar
- Karl Hunter - clarinet, soprano saxophone, tenor saxophone
- Andy Rowley - baritone saxophone, background vocals
- Glen "The Kid" Marhevka - trumpet, cornet
- Joshua Levy - piano
- Ruben Estrada - vibraphone
- Ronnie Manaog - marimba, glockenspiel, timpani, wood block, jingle bell
- Dirk Shumaker - acoustic bass, vocals, background vocals
- Kurt Sodergren - drums

Additional personnel

- Ryan Freeland - audio mixer
