= Lee Collins (musician) =

American jazz musician (1901–1960)

- Birth name: Leeds Collins
- Born: October 17, 1901; New Orleans, Louisiana, U.S.
- Died: July 3, 1960 (aged 58); Chicago, Illinois, U.S.
- Genres: Jazz
- Instruments: Trumpet

Leeds "Lee" Collins (October 17, 1901 – July 3, 1960) was an American jazz trumpeter.

== Early life ==
Collins was born in New Orleans, Louisiana. As a teenager, he played in brass bands, including the Young Eagles, the Columbia Band, and the Tuxedo Brass Band.

== Career ==
In the 1910s, Collins played in New Orleans alongside Louis Armstrong, Papa Celestin, and Zutty Singleton. Hemoved to Chicago, Illinois, in 1924, where he replaced Louis Armstrong in King Oliver's band. He also played with Jelly Roll Morton, but the two had disagreements and fell out when Collins claimed that Morton stole the song "Fish Tail Blues" from him. Collins returned to New Orleans, where he played on the recordings of the Jones & Collins Astoria Hot Eight in 1929. He then played in New York City with Luis Russell in 1930. He went back to Chicago, where he played with Dave Peyton (1930), the Chicago Ramblers (1932), Johnny Dodds and Baby Dodds, Zutty Singleton, Mezz Mezzrow, Lovie Austin, and Jimmy Bertrand (1945).

Collins played in Chicago through the 1930s and 1940s as an accompanist to many blues singers and in nightclubs. After 1945, he led his own band at the Victory Club, on Clark Street in Chicago, and gigged with Bertha Hill (1946), Kid Ory (1948), and Art Hodes (1950–1951). He played in Europe with Mezz Mezzrow in 1951 and 1954 and in California with Joe Sullivan in 1953. In the mid-1950s he retired because of illness.

== Personal life ==
Collins wrote an autobiography, Oh, Didn't He Ramble, with the aid of his wife, Mary, which was originally published posthumously in 1974.

Collins died in Chicago in July 1960, at the age of 58.

== Bibliography ==
- Feather, Leonard; Gitler, Ira (1999). The Biographical Encyclopedia of Jazz. New York City: Oxford University Press. p. 144. ISBN 9780195074185.
