= George Stone (composer) =

- Born: George Stone; January 19, 1965 (age 61); Newhall, California, U.S.
- Genres: Big band jazz
- Occupation: Educator
- Instrument: Trumpet

George Stone (born January 19, 1965) is a musician and educator. He had composed and arranged music for instrumental and vocal ensembles, with the bulk of his material for the big band format. He is best known for his 1990 MIDI composition CANYON.MID ("Trip Through the Grand Canyon"), which was included in the MEDIA directory in Microsoft Windows versions 3.0 with Multimedia Extensions to 2000.

Born and raised in Newhall, CA, George was a product of the local music programs and teachers of the Santa Clarita Valley. He graduated from Hart High School and received his degrees from Cal State University Northridge, where he was a member of the Jazz A-Band.

According to his (now defunct) website, he has collaborated with "Maynard Ferguson, Clare Fischer, Dave Grusin, Tom Scott, the American Jazz Philharmonic (SJO) and the Tonight Show Orchestra with Doc Severinsen," and "has composed for CBS, NBC, HBO, ABC and Disney."

After graduation from Cal State Northridge he taught music at William S. Hart High School. A move to Cambria, CA, brought him to the music faculty at Cuesta College, San Luis Obispo, CA, where he currently teaches Audio Technology and Music Theory/Composition.

George Stone self-published the jazz album The Real Deal in 2010. Under the larger band moniker The George Stone Big Band, he released the album Piece by Piece in 2000, under the label Sea Breeze Jazz.
