= Glen Marhevka =

American trumpet player

Glen Marhevka is an American trumpet player. He grew up in Valencia, California, U.S., where he attended William S. Hart High School. He was mentored by George Stone, Dirk Fischer and Larry Thornton. After graduating from California State University, Northridge with a bachelor's degree in Trumpet Performance and working as a freelance musician, he became a member of the Grammy nominated band Big Bad Voodoo Daddy of which he has been the featured trumpet soloist for over 21 years.

Marhevka has also performed and or recorded with artists such as Ben Harper, B.B. King, Gary Cherone, and Disney's Imagination Movers. He is a Yamaha Artist and clinician. He has promoted music education in schools across the country.
