= R. Q. Dickerson =

American jazz musician

Roger Quincey Dickerson
- Born: 1898; Paducah, Kentucky, U.S.
- Died: January 21, 1951 (aged 53) Glens Falls, New York, U.S.
- Genre: Jazz
- Occupation: Trumpeter
- Instruments: Trumpet
- Years active: Late 1910s–1931, 1949

Roger Quincey Dickerson (1898 – January 21, 1951) was an American jazz trumpeter.

== Biography ==
He was born in 1898 in Paducah, Kentucky.

Dickerson was raised in St. Louis, Missouri, where he worked in local theaters in the late 1910s. He toured with Wilson Robinson's Bostonians in 1923, and then worked in Andrew Preer's group at the Cotton Club in New York City, remaining in the group after Preer's death in 1927. Dickerson was still in the group when Cab Calloway took it over in 1930, and he recorded several times under Calloway. He also recorded in small groups with Harry Cooper (1925) and Jasper Taylor (1928); the latter session also featured Johnny Dodds.

Dickerson left Calloway's employ in 1931 and quit music, but recorded again in 1949 accompanying a singer named Ray Cully.

He died on January 21, 1951, in Glens Falls, New York.
