= Big Bad Voodoo Daddy =

American swing band formed 1989

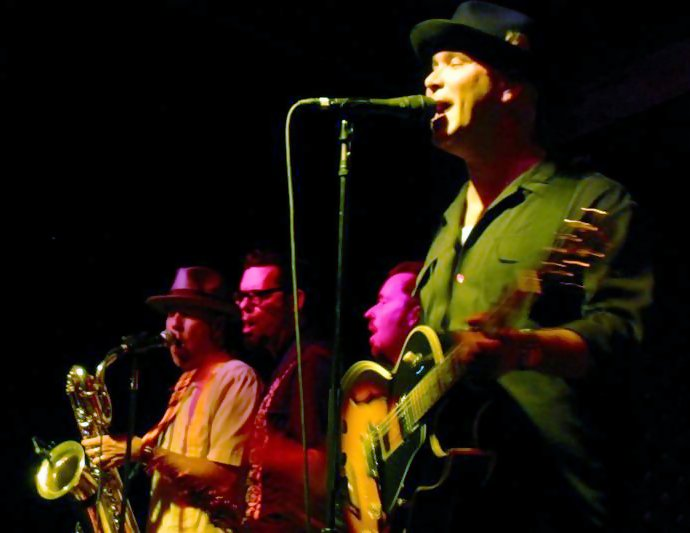

Background information
- Origin: Ventura, California, U.S.
- Genres: Swing revival; jump blues; lounge
- Years active: 1989–present
- Labels: Big Bad, Interscope, Capitol, Vanguard, Savoy, Concord
- Members: Scotty Morris; Kurt Sodergren; Dirk Shumaker; Andy Rowley; Glen "The Kid" Marhevka; Karl Hunter; Joshua Levy
- Past members: Jeff Harris; Ralph Votrian; Nick Murphy; Paul Ritchey; Josh Henderson
- Website: www.bbvd.com

Big Bad Voodoo Daddy is a contemporary swing revival band from Southern California. Their notable singles include "Go Daddy-O", "You & Me & the Bottle Makes 3 Tonight (Baby)", and "Mr. Pinstripe Suit". The band played at the Super Bowl XXXIII halftime show in 1999.

The band was originally formed in Ventura, California, in 1989 by leader Scotty Morris (guitar and vocals). The band was named Big Bad Voodoo Daddy after Scotty Morris met blues guitar legend Albert Collins at one of the latter's concerts. "He signed my poster 'To Scotty, the big bad voodoo daddy'," Morris explains. "I thought it was the coolest name I ever heard on one of the coolest musical nights I ever had. So when it came time to name this band, I didn't really have a choice. I felt like it was handed down to me."

Morris and drummer Kurt Sodergren are the two original members who have appeared in every incarnation of the band. Big Bad Voodoo Daddy has concentrated on performing their own interpretations of swing music of the 1940s and 1950s and original songs in a similar style, regularly touring and performing worldwide.

== History ==
=== Early career: 1989–1996 ===
After playing in punk and alternative rock bands during the 1980s, including False Confession, part of the Oxnard, California Nardcore scene, Scotty Morris founded Big Bad Voodoo Daddy with Kurt Sodergren. The band launched two CDs, Big Bad Voodoo Daddy and Watchu' Want for Christmas? under their own label (Big Bad Records) before getting their big break when their songs "You & Me & the Bottle Makes 3 Tonight (Baby)", "I Wan'na Be Like You" and "Go Daddy-O" were featured in the soundtrack of the 1996 comedy-drama Swingers.

The band was also the house band for the television game show Big Deal, a partial remake of Let's Make a Deal.

=== Commercial success: 1997–2004 ===
From there, they were signed by Interscope Records. With Interscope, the band released Americana Deluxe, This Beautiful Life, and Save My Soul. The band has continued their tours, performances and album releases. The band appeared at the half-time show of Super Bowl XXXIII (January 31, 1999) and the 2006 Capital One Bowl, and also served as the house band for ESPN's ESPY Awards for a few years. The band created a version of the opening theme for the sitcom 3rd Rock from the Sun, which was used for the 1998–1999 and 1999–2000 seasons.

=== Live performances and return: 2005–present ===
They created a new song for the movie The Wild, "Big Time Toppin' (Go Man Go)", and recorded a song for Disney's Phineas and Ferb "Christmas Vacation" special. Big Bad Voodoo Daddy also performed on the hit television show Dancing with the Stars, and The Tonight Show with Jay Leno to promote their album How Big Can You Get?: The Music of Cab Calloway, a collection of their renditions of Cab Calloway songs that was released in April 2009. They also have been performing at EPCOT for the annual Food and Wine Festival since 2008. They performed at Kahilu Theatre, Waimea, Hawaii and while Sodergren was there, he spoke of going to Morris's house in Ventura and working on a new album beginning February 2019. He also mentioned that the band had played at one of Donald Trump's birthday parties. Their website was updated for their 30th anniversary, which took place in 2023, and mentions upcoming releases.

== Band members ==
Current members

- Scotty Morris (lead vocals and guitar)
- Kurt Sodergren (drums and percussion)
- Dirk Shumaker (double bass and vocals)
- Andy Rowley (baritone saxophone and vocals)
- Glen "The Kid" Marhevka (trumpet)
- Karl Hunter (saxophones and clarinet)
- Joshua Levy (piano, arranger)

Touring members

- Alex "Crazy Legs" Henderson (trombone)
- Mitchell Cooper (Lead trumpet)
- Matthew Mill (Lead trumpet)

Former members

- Jeff Harris (trombone) (Americana Deluxe)
- Ralph Votrian (trumpet) (Big Bad Voodoo Daddy)

== Discography ==
=== Albums ===
==== Studio albums ====
Title	Details	Peak chart positions		
Title	Details	US	US Indie	US Jazz
Big Bad Voodoo Daddy	Released: 1994; Label: Big Bad	—	—	—
Americana Deluxe	Released: February 24, 1998; Label: Interscope, Coolsville	47	—	—
This Beautiful Life	Released: October 19, 1999; Label: Interscope, Coolsville	93	—	—
Save My Soul	Released: July 8, 2003; Label: Big Bad, Vanguard	195	12	—
Everything You Want for Christmas	Released: October 12, 2004; Label: Big Bad, Vanguard	—	31	—
How Big Can You Get?: The Music of Cab Calloway	Released: April 21, 2009; Label: Big Bad, Vanguard	—	—	—
Rattle Them Bones	Released: August 31, 2012; Label: Savoy, Concord	129	—	2
It Feels Like Christmas Time	Released: October 22, 2013; Label: Savoy	—	—	—
Louie Louie Louie	Released: June 16, 2017; Label: Savoy	—	—	7

==== Live albums ====
Title	Details
Big Bad Voodoo Daddy Live	Released: 2004; Label: Big Bad, Vanguard

==== Compilation albums ====
Title	Details
20th Century Masters - The Millennium Collection: The Best of Big Bad Voodoo Daddy	Released: 2005; Label: Interscope

=== Extended plays ===
Title	Details
Watchu' Want for Christmas?	Released: 1995; Label: Big Bad

=== Singles ===
Title	Year	Peak chart positions		Album
Title	Year	US	US Alt	Album
"You and Me and the Bottle Makes Three Tonight (Baby)"	1998	104	31	Americana Deluxe

== Filmography ==
- Big Bad Voodoo Daddy appeared as themselves in Night of the Living Doo, a special farcical episode of Scooby-Doo.
- Big Bad Voodoo Daddy appeared as themselves in the 1996 film Swingers, in which they played a set (including "You & Me & the Bottle Makes 3 Tonight (Baby)") at a club that the characters visit.
- An uncredited appearance as the band at Salinger's Restaurant in the Party of Five season 2 episode "Change Partners... And Dance".
- The band appeared on an episode of Hell's Kitchen when they attended dinner service in the twelfth episode of Season 13.
- In 1999, the band appeared in season 2 episode 19 of Ally McBeal, "Let's Dance", during a swing dance competition.
- The band performed the theme song for the NBA on TNT from 1999 to 2000.
