= Cab Calloway =

American jazz singer, songwriter, and bandleader (1907–1994)

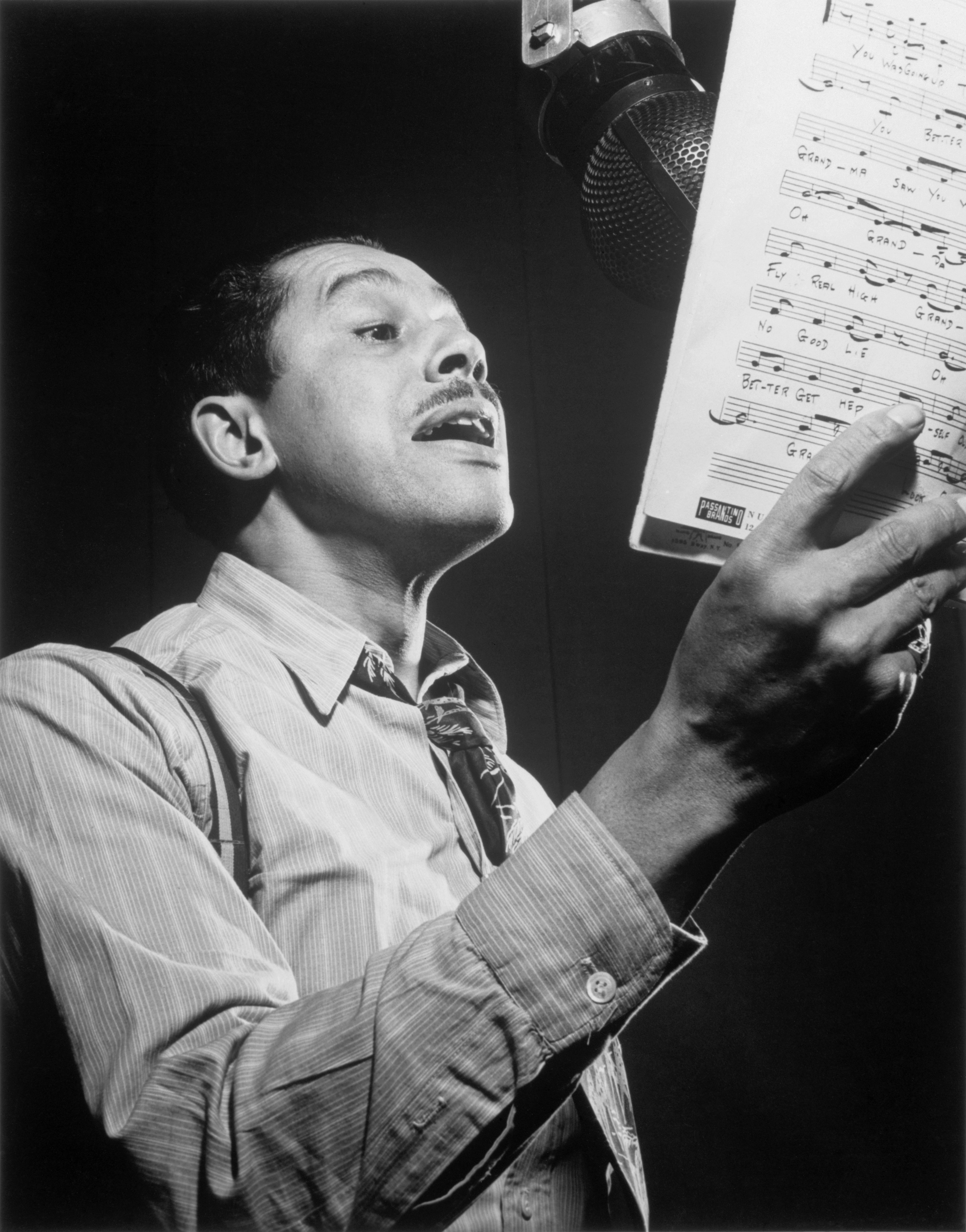
- Cab Calloway in 1947
- Born: Cabell Calloway III; December 25, 1907; Rochester, New York, U.S.
- Died: November 18, 1994 (aged 86); Hockessin, Delaware, U.S.
- Burial place: Ferncliff Cemetery
- Occupations: Singer; songwriter; bandleader; actor
- Years active: 1927–1994
- Spouses: Wenonah Conacher (m. 1928; div. 1949); Zulme MacNeal (m. 1949)
- Children: 5, including Camay Calloway Murphy
- Musical career
- Genres: Jazz; blues; swing; big band
- Labels: Brunswick; Epic; Gone; RCA Victor; Coral; Pickwick International
- Website: www.cabcalloway.com

Cabell Calloway III (December 25, 1907 – November 18, 1994) was an American jazz singer, songwriter, bandleader, and actor. He was a regular performer at the Cotton Club in Harlem, where he became a popular vocalist of the swing era. His niche of mixing jazz and vaudeville won him acclaim during a career that spanned over 65 years.

Calloway was a master of energetic scat singing and led one of the most popular dance bands in the United States from the early 1930s to the late 1940s. His band included trumpeters Dizzy Gillespie, Jonah Jones, and Adolphus "Doc" Cheatham, saxophonists Ben Webster and Leon "Chu" Berry, guitarist Danny Barker, bassist Milt Hinton, and drummer Cozy Cole.

Calloway had several hit records in the 1930s and 1940s, becoming the first African-American musician to sell one million copies of a record. He became known as the "Hi-de-ho" man of jazz for his most famous song, "Minnie the Moocher", originally recorded in 1931. He reached the Billboard charts in five consecutive decades (1930s–1970s). Calloway also made several stage, film, and television appearances. He had roles in Stormy Weather (1943), Porgy and Bess (1953), The Cincinnati Kid (1965), and Hello, Dolly! (1967). In the 1980s, Calloway enjoyed a marked career resurgence following his appearance in the musical comedy film The Blues Brothers (1980).

Calloway was the first African-American to have a nationally syndicated radio program. In 1993, Calloway received the National Medal of Arts from the United States Congress. He posthumously received the Grammy Lifetime Achievement Award in 2008. His song "Minnie the Moocher" was inducted into the Grammy Hall of Fame in 1999 and was selected for preservation in the Library of Congress' National Recording Registry in 2019. In 2022, the Library of Congress selected his home films for preservation in the National Film Registry as being "culturally, historically or aesthetically significant films". He was inducted into the Big Band and Jazz Hall of Fame and the International Jazz Hall of Fame.

== Early life ==
Cabell Calloway III was born in Rochester, New York, on December 25, 1907. His father, Cabell Calloway Jr., graduated from Lincoln University of Pennsylvania in 1898. His mother, Martha Eulalia Reed, was a Morgan State College graduate, teacher, and church organist, and worked as a lawyer and in real estate. The family moved to Baltimore, Maryland, in 1919. Soon after, his father died and his mother remarried to John Nelson Fortune.

Calloway grew up in the West Baltimore neighborhood of Druid Hill. He often skipped school to earn money by selling newspapers, shining shoes, and cooling down horses at the Pimlico racetrack where he developed an interest in racing and gambling on horses. After he was caught playing dice on the church steps, his mother sent him to Downingtown Industrial and Agricultural School in 1921, a reform school run by his mother's uncle in Chester County, Pennsylvania. Calloway resumed hustling when he returned to Baltimore and worked as a caterer while he improved his education in school. He began private vocal lessons in 1922 and studied music throughout his formal schooling. Despite his parents' and teachers' disapproval of jazz, he began performing in nightclubs in Baltimore. His mentors included drummer Chick Webb and pianist Johnny Jones. Calloway joined his high school basketball team, and in his senior year, he started playing professional basketball with the Baltimore Athenians, a team in the Negro Professional Basketball League. He graduated from Frederick Douglass High School in 1925. After this, he spent a short period of time at law school in Chicago but left to continue performing in nightclubs.

== Music career ==
=== 1927–1929: Early career ===
In 1927, Calloway joined his older sister, Blanche Calloway, on tour for the popular black musical revue Plantation Days. His sister became an accomplished bandleader before he did, and he often credited her as his inspiration for entering show business. Calloway's mother wanted him to be a lawyer like his father, so once the tour ended, he enrolled at Crane College in Chicago, though he was more interested in singing and entertaining. While at Crane, he refused the opportunity to play basketball for the Harlem Globetrotters to pursue a singing career.

Calloway spent most of his nights at black and tan clubs, such as Chicago's Dreamland Café, Sunset Cafe, and Club Berlin, performing as a singer, drummer, and master of ceremonies. At Sunset Cafe, he was an understudy for singer Adelaide Hall. There, he met and performed with Louis Armstrong, who taught him to sing in the scat style. He left school to sing with the Alabamians band.

In 1929, Calloway relocated to New York with the band. They opened at the Savoy Ballroom on September 20, 1929. When the Alabamians broke up, Armstrong recommended Calloway as a replacement singer in the musical revue Connie's Hot Chocolates. He established himself as a vocalist, singing "Ain't Misbehavin'" by Fats Waller. While Calloway was performing in the revue, the Missourians asked him to front their band.

=== 1930–1955: Success ===
In 1930, the Missourians became known as Cab Calloway and His Orchestra. At the Cotton Club in Harlem, New York, the band was hired in 1931 to substitute for the Duke Ellington Orchestra while Ellington's band was on tour. Their popularity led to a permanent position. The band also performed twice a week for radio broadcasts on NBC. Calloway appeared on radio programs with Walter Winchell and Bing Crosby and was the first African American to have a nationally syndicated radio show. During the depths of the Great Depression, Calloway was earning $50,000 a year at 23 years old.

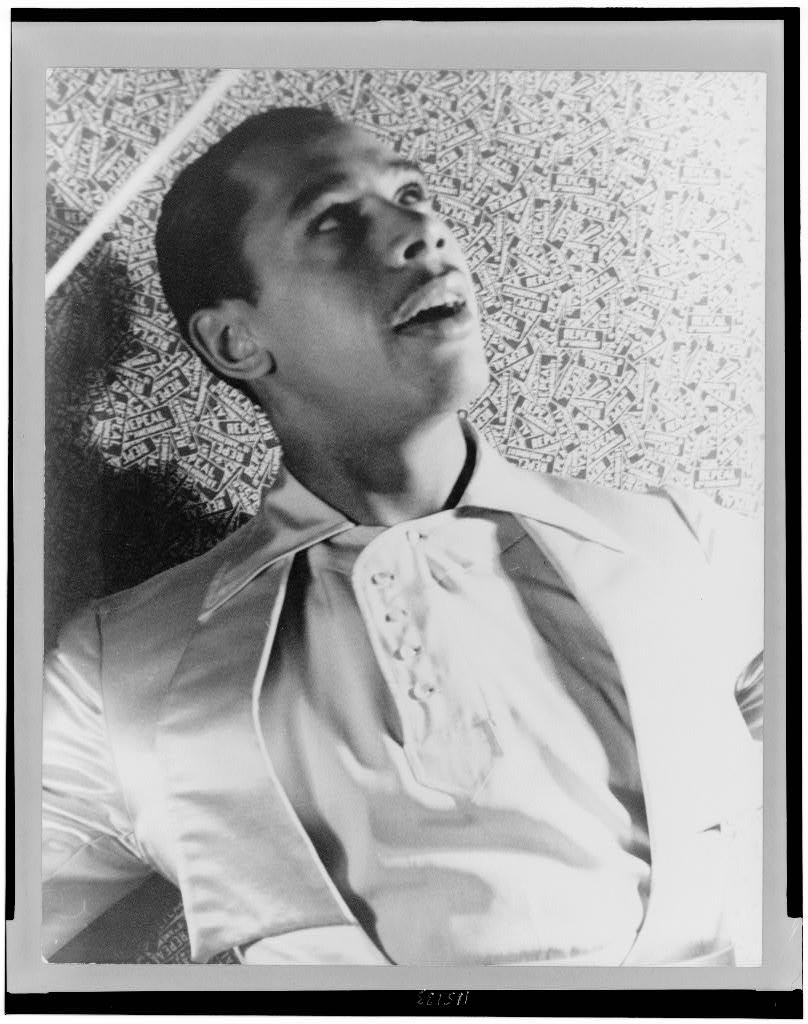
Calloway by Carl Van Vechten, 1933

In 1931, Calloway recorded his most famous song, "Minnie the Moocher". It was the first single record by an African American to sell a million copies. Calloway performed the song and two others, "St. James Infirmary Blues" and "The Old Man of the Mountain", in the Betty Boop cartoons Minnie the Moocher (1932), Snow-White (1933), and The Old Man of the Mountain (1933). Calloway performed voice-over for these cartoons, and through rotoscoping, his dance steps were the basis of the characters' movements.

As a result of the success of "Minnie the Moocher", Calloway became identified with its chorus, gaining the nickname the "Hi-de-ho man". He performed in the 1930s in a series of short films for Paramount. Calloway's and Ellington's groups were featured on film more than any other jazz orchestras of the era. In these films, Calloway can be seen performing a gliding backstep dance move, which some observers have described as the precursor to Michael Jackson's moonwalk. Calloway said 50 years later, "it was called The Buzz back then." The 1933 film International House featured Calloway performing his classic song "Reefer Man", a tune about a man who smokes marijuana. Fredi Washington was cast as Calloway's love interest in Cab Calloway's Hi-De-Ho (1934). Lena Horne made her film debut as a dancer in Cab Calloway's Jitterbug Party (1935).

Calloway made his first Hollywood feature film appearance opposite Al Jolson in The Singing Kid (1936). He sang several duets with Jolson, and the film included Calloway's band and 22 Cotton Club dancers from New York. According to the film critic Arthur Knight, the creators of the film intended to "erase and celebrate boundaries and differences, including most emphatically the color line ... when Calloway begins singing in his characteristic style – in which the words are tools for exploring rhythm and stretching melody – it becomes clear that American culture is changing around Jolson and with (and through) Calloway".

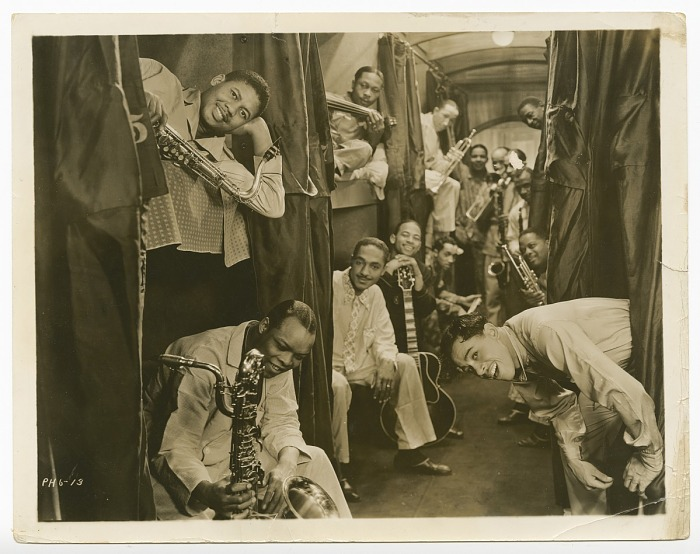
Calloway (lower right) and members of his band posing for a photo in a train sleeping car, 1933

In 1938, Calloway released Cab Calloway's Cat-ologue: A Hepster's Dictionary, the first dictionary published by an African American. It became the official jive language reference book of the New York Public Library. A revised version of the book was released, Professor Cab Calloway's Swingformation Bureau, in 1939. He released the last edition, The New Cab Calloway's Hepsters Dictionary: Language of Jive, in 1944. On a BBC Radio documentary about the dictionary in 2014, Poet Lemn Sissay stated, "Cab Calloway was taking ownership of language for a people who, just a few generations before, had their own languages taken away."

Calloway's band in the 1930s and 1940s included many notable musicians, such as Ben Webster, Illinois Jacquet, Milt Hinton, Danny Barker, Doc Cheatham, Ed Swayze, Cozy Cole, Eddie Barefield, and Dizzy Gillespie. Calloway later recalled, "What I expected from my musicians was what I was selling: the right notes with precision, because I would build a whole song around a scat or dance step." Calloway and his band formed baseball and basketball teams. They played each other while on the road, played against local semi-pro teams, and played charity games.

In 1941, Calloway fired Gillespie from his orchestra after an onstage fracas erupted when Calloway was hit with spitballs. He wrongly accused Gillespie, who stabbed Calloway in the leg with a small knife.

From 1941 to 1942, Calloway hosted a weekly radio quiz show called The Cab Calloway Quizzicale. Calling himself "Doctor" Calloway, it was a parody of The College of Musical Knowledge, a radio contest created by bandleader Kay Kyser. During the years of World War II, Calloway entertained troops in United States before they departed overseas. The Calloway Orchestra also recorded songs full of social commentary, including "Doing the Reactionary", "The Führer's Got the Jitters", "The Great Lie", "We'll Gather Lilacs", and "My Lament for V Day".

In 1943, Calloway appeared in the film Stormy Weather, one of the first mainstream Hollywood films with a black cast. The film featured other top performers of the time, including Bill "Bojangles" Robinson, Lena Horne, the Nicholas Brothers, and Fats Waller. Calloway would host Horne's character, Selina Rogers, as she performed the film's title song as part of a big all-star revue for World War II soldiers.

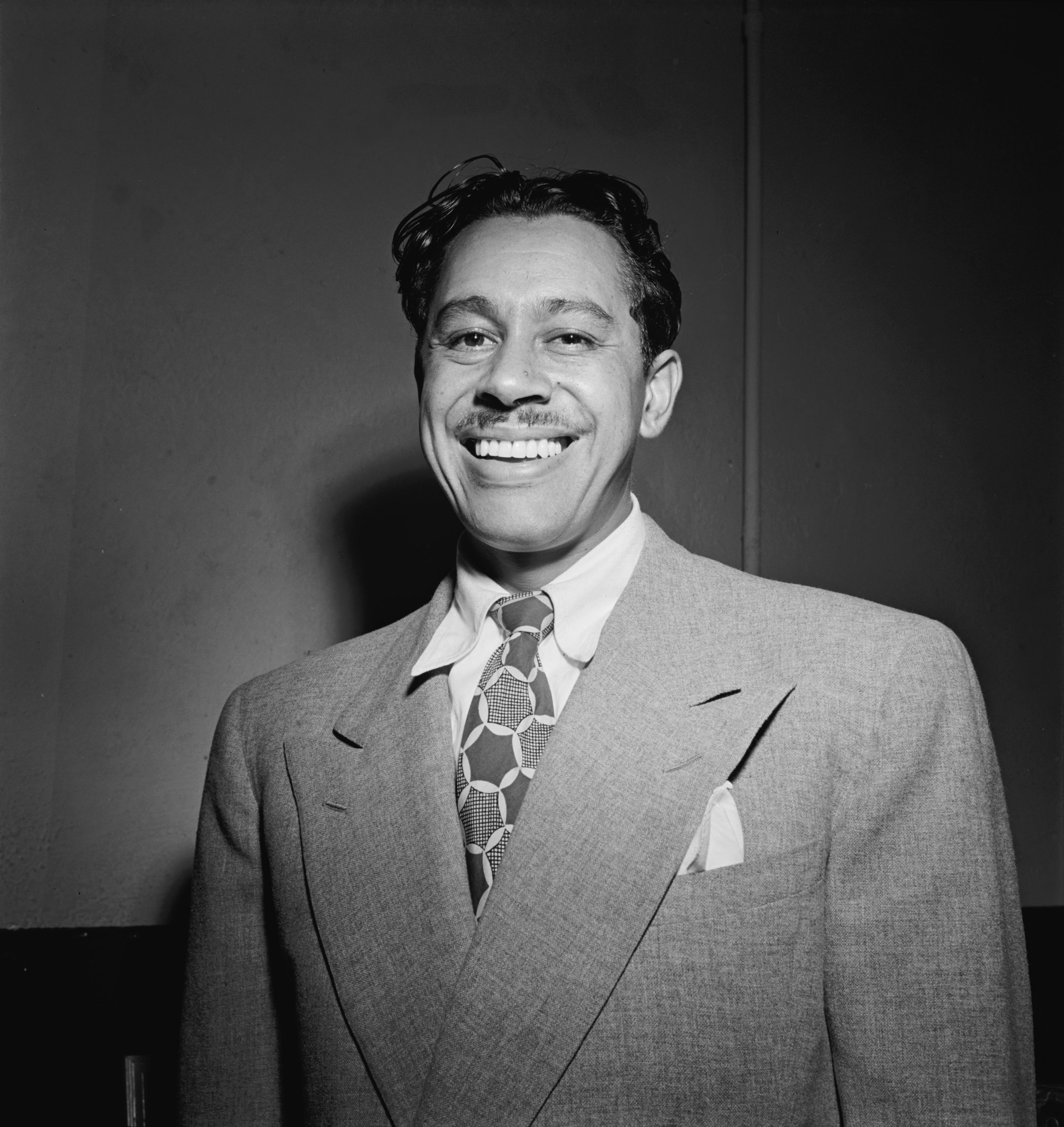
Calloway in New York City, c. October 1946

Calloway wrote a humorous pseudo-gossip column called "Coastin' with Cab" for Song Hits magazine. It was a collection of celebrity snippets, such as the following in the May 1946 issue: "Benny Goodman was dining at Ciro's steak house in New York when a very homely girl entered. 'If her face is her fortune,' Benny quipped, 'she'd be tax-free.'" In the late 1940s, however, Calloway's bad financial decisions and his gambling caused his band to break up.

In 1953, Calloway played the prominent role of Sportin' Life in a Broadway revival of Porgy and Bess.

=== 1956–1960: Cotton Club Revue ===
Calloway and his daughter Lael recorded "Little Child", an adaption of "Little Boy and the Old Man". Released on ABC-Paramount, the single charted on the Billboard Hot 100 in 1956.

For the second season, Lee Sherman was the choreographer of the Cotton Club Revue of 1958, which starred Calloway. The revue featured tap-dancing prodigies Maurice and Gregory Hines.

In March 1958, Calloway released his album Cotton Club Revue of 1958 on Gone Records. It was produced by George Goldner and conducted and arranged by Eddie Barefield. That year, Calloway appeared in the film St. Louis Blues, the life story of W. C. Handy, featuring Nat King Cole and Eartha Kitt.

The Cotton Club Revue of 1959 traveled to South America for engagements in Rio de Janeiro and São Paulo. They also stopped in Uruguay and Argentina before returning to North America which included a run on Broadway.

=== 1961–1993: Later years ===
Calloway remained a household name due to TV appearances and occasional concerts in the U.S. and Europe. In 1961 and 1962, he toured with the Harlem Globetrotters, providing halftime entertainment during games.

Calloway was cast as "Yeller" in the film The Cincinnati Kid (1965), with Steve McQueen, Ann-Margret, and Edward G. Robinson. He appeared on The Ed Sullivan Show on March 19, 1967, with his daughter Chris Calloway. In 1967, he co-starred with Pearl Bailey as Horace Vandergelder in an all-black cast of Hello, Dolly! on Broadway during its original run. Chris Calloway also joined the cast as Minnie Fay. The new cast revived the flagging business for the show and RCA Victor released a new cast recording, rare for the time. In 1973–74, Calloway was featured in an unsuccessful Broadway revival of The Pajama Game with Hal Linden and Barbara McNair.

His autobiography, Of Minnie the Moocher and Me, was published in 1976. It included his complete Hepster's Dictionary as an appendix. In 1978, Calloway released a disco version of "Minnie the Moocher" on RCA Victor which reached the Billboard R&B chart. Calloway was introduced to a new generation when he appeared in the 1980 film The Blues Brothers performing "Minnie the Moocher".

In 1985, Calloway and his Orchestra appeared at The Ritz London Hotel where he was filmed for a 60-minute BBC TV show called The Cotton Club Comes to the Ritz. Adelaide Hall, Doc Cheatham, Max Roach, and Nicholas Brothers also appeared on the bill. A performance with the Cincinnati Pops Orchestra, directed by Erich Kunzel, in August 1988 was recorded on video and features a classic presentation of "Minnie the Moocher", 57 years after he first recorded it.

In January 1990, Calloway performed at the Meyerhoff Symphony Hall with the Baltimore Symphony Orchestra. That year, he made a cameo in Janet Jackson's music video "Alright". He continued to perform at jazz festivals, including the New Orleans Jazz & Heritage Festival and Greenwood Jazz. In 1992, he embarked on a month-long tour of European jazz festivals. He was booked to headline "The Jazz Connection: The Jewish and African-American Relationship", at New York City's Avery Fisher Hall in 1993, but he pulled out due to a fall at home.

== Personal life ==
In January 1927, Calloway had a daughter named Camay with Zelma Proctor, a fellow student. His daughter was one of the first African Americans to teach in a white school in Virginia. Calloway married his first wife, Wenonah "Betty" Conacher, in July 1928. They adopted a daughter named Constance and divorced in 1949. Calloway married Zulme "Nuffie" MacNeal on October 7, 1949. They lived in Long Beach on the South Shore of Long Island, New York, on the border with the neighboring Lido Beach. In the 1950s, Calloway moved his family to Westchester County, New York, where he and Nuffie raised their daughters, Chris Calloway (1945–2008), Cecilia "Lael" Eulalia Calloway, and Cabella Calloway (1952–2023).

Calloway was an Episcopalian.

=== Legal issues ===
In December 1945, Calloway and his friend Felix H. Payne Jr. were beaten by a police officer, William E. Todd, and arrested in Kansas City, Missouri, after attempting to visit bandleader Lionel Hampton at the whites-only Pla-Mor Ballroom. They were taken to the hospital for injuries, then charged with intoxication and resisting arrest. When Hampton learned of the incident, he refused to continue the concert. Todd said he was informed by the manager, who did not recognize Calloway, that they were attempting to enter. He claimed they refused to leave and struck him. Calloway and Payne denied his claims and maintained they had been sober; the charges were dismissed. In February 1946, six civil rights organizations, including the NAACP, demanded that Todd be fired, but he had already resigned after a pay cut.

In 1952, Calloway was arrested in Leesburg, Virginia, on his way to the race track in Charles Town, West Virginia. He was charged with speeding and attempted bribery of a policeman.

== Death ==
On June 12, 1994, Calloway suffered a severe stroke at his home in White Plains, New York. Following months of hospitalization and specialized care, he was moved to Cokesbury Village, a retirement and nursing facility in Hockessin, Delaware. On November 18, 1994, at the age of 88, he died of pneumonia with his family at his side. A public memorial service celebrating his life and musical career was held in Manhattan at the Cathedral of St. John the Divine. The service functioned as a joyous concert rather than a somber funeral, featuring performances of his signature music and a eulogy by Bill Cosby, who remembered Calloway's boundless showmanship, humor, and influence on younger Black artists. He was survived by his wife, Zulme "Nuffie" MacNeal Calloway, who died in 2008, five daughters, and seven grandsons. Calloway's body was cremated, and following his wife's passing, their ashes were interred together in the Rosewood Mausoleum at Ferncliff Cemetery in Hartsdale, New York.

== Legacy ==
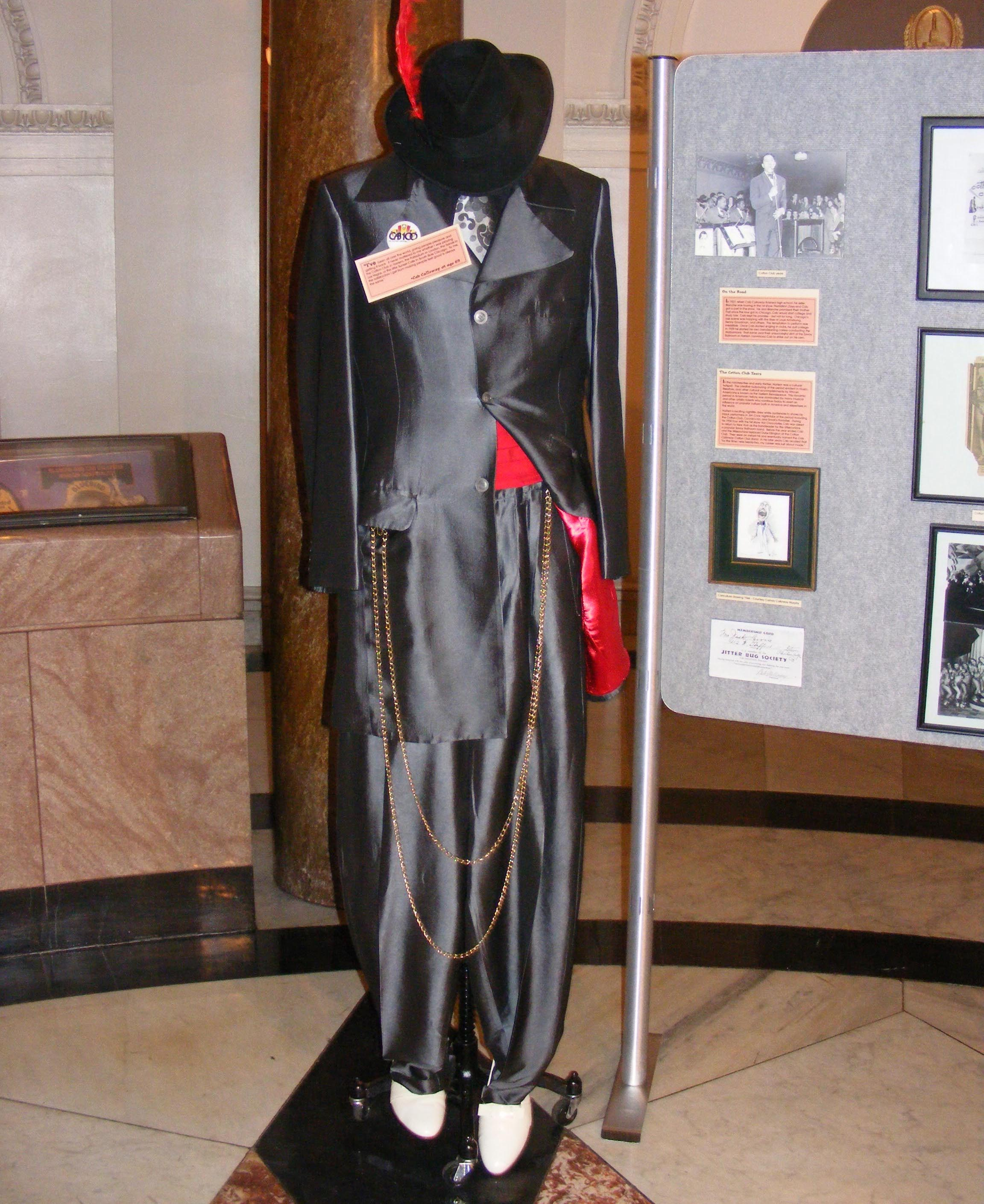
One of Calloway's zoot suits on display in Baltimore City Hall, October 2007

Music critics have written of his influence on later generations of entertainers such as James Brown, Michael Jackson, and Janet Jackson, as well as modern-day hip-hop performers. John Landis, who directed Calloway in the 1980 film The Blues Brothers, stated, "Cab Calloway is hip-hop." Journalist Timothy White noted in Billboard (August 14, 1993), "No living pathfinder in American popular music or its jazz and rock 'n' roll capillaries is so frequently emulated yet so seldom acknowledged as Cabell 'Cab' Calloway. He arguably did more things first and better than any other band leader of his generation."

In 1998, the Cab Calloway Orchestra directed by Calloway's grandson Chris "CB" Calloway Brooks was formed. In 2009, Big Bad Voodoo Daddy released an album covering Calloway's music titled How Big Can You Get?: The Music of Cab Calloway. In 2012, Calloway's legacy was celebrated in an episode of PBS's American Masters titled "Cab Calloway: Sketches".

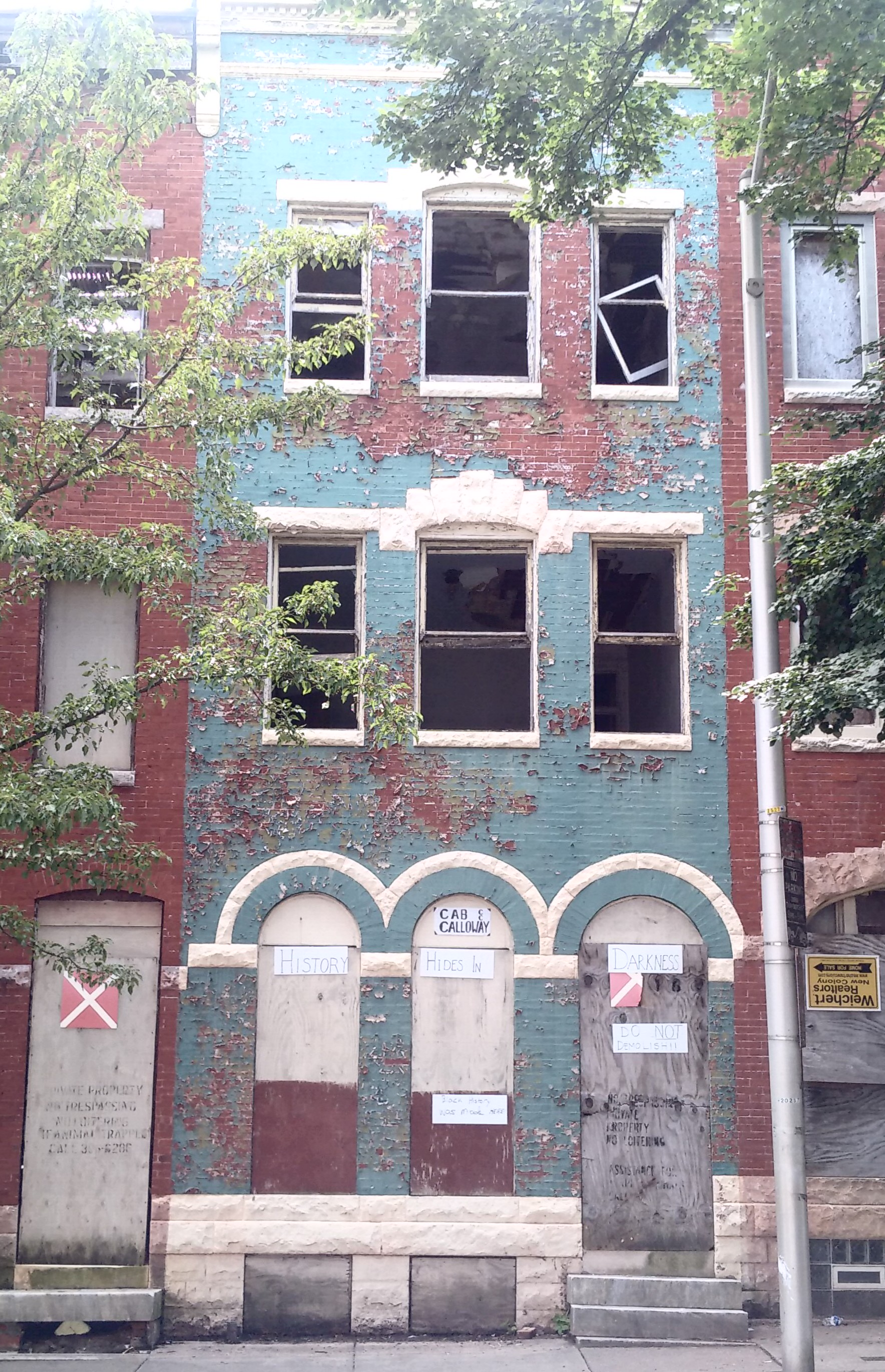
Calloway's boyhood home in Baltimore, before its demolition in September 2020

In 2019, plans were announced to demolish Calloway's boyhood home at 2216 Druid Hill Avenue in Baltimore, replacing the abandoned structure and the rest of that block with a park to be named Cab Calloway Legends Park in his honor. Family members and the National Trust for Historic Preservation advocated preservation of the house, however, as a significant artifact of African-American cultural heritage. Although the block is designated "historically significant" on the National Register of Historic Places, Baltimore City officials said at a hearing on July 9, 2019, that there is "extensive structural damage" to the Calloway house as well as adjacent ones. The Commission on Historical and Architectural Preservation's executive director, however, said that properties in worse condition than the Calloway House have been restored with financial support from a city tax credit program. Maryland Governor Larry Hogan also urged that demolition of the Calloway House be forestalled for its potential preservation as a historic house museum akin to the Louis Armstrong House in New York. Design options for the planned Cab Calloway Square may include an archway from the facade (pictured) as part of the Square's entrance, as proposed by architects working with Baltimore City and the Druid Heights Community Development Corporation, a nonprofit community-oriented group. Despite objections, the house was razed on September 5, 2020.

=== Awards and honors ===
In 1985, Town Supervisor Anthony F. Veteran issued a proclamation, declaring a ''Cab Calloway Day'' in Greenburgh, New York.

In 1990, Calloway was presented with the Beacons in Jazz Award from The New School in New York City. New York City Mayor David Dinkins proclaimed the day "Cab Calloway Day".

In 1992, the Cab Calloway School of the Arts was founded in Wilmington, Delaware.

In 1994, Calloway's daughter Camay Calloway Murphy founded the Cab Calloway Museum at Coppin State College in Baltimore, Maryland.

The New York Racing Association (NYRA) annually honors the jazz legend, a native of Rochester, New York, with a stakes races restricted to New York–bred three-year-olds, as part of their New York Stallion Series. First run in 2003, The Calloway has since undergone various distance and surface changes. The race is currently run at Saratoga Race Course, Saratoga Springs, New York. The Cab Calloway Stakes celebrated its 13th renewal on July 24, 2019, and was won by Rinaldi.

In 2020, Calloway was inducted into the National Rhythm & Blues Hall of Fame.

Calloway received the following accolades:

- 1967: Best Performance, Outer Critics Circle Awards, for Hello, Dolly!
- 1987: Inducted into the Big Band and Jazz Hall of Fame
- 1990: Beacons in Jazz Award, The New School
- 1993: National Medal of Arts
- 1993: Honorary Doctorate of Fine Arts, University of Rochester
- 1993: Cab Calloway School of the Arts dedicated in his name in Wilmington, Delaware
- 1995: Inducted into the International Jazz Hall of Fame
- 1999: Grammy Hall of Fame Award for "Minnie the Moocher" (1931)
- 2008: Grammy Lifetime Achievement Award
- 2019: "Minnie the Moocher" added to the Library of Congress' National Recording Registry

== Discography ==
=== Albums ===
- 1943: Cab Calloway and His Orchestra (Brunswick)
- 1956: Cab Calloway (Epic)
- 1958: Cotton Club Revue 1958 (Gone)
- 1959: Hi De Hi De Ho (RCA Victor)
- 1962: Blues Make Me Happy (Coral)
- 1968: Cab Calloway '68 (Pickwick International)

=== Select compilations ===
- 1968: Cab Calloway Sings the Blues (Vocalion)
- 1974: Hi De Ho Man (Columbia)
- 1981: Minnie the Moocher (RCA International)
- 1983: Mr. Hi. De. Ho. 1930–1931 (MCA)
- 1990: Cab Calloway: Best of the Big Bands (Columbia)
- 1992: Cab Calloway & Co. (RCA)
- 1992: The King of Hi-De-Ho 1934–1947 (Giants of Jazz)
- 1998: Jumpin' Jive (Camden)
- 2001: Cab Calloway and His Orchestra Volume 1: The Early Years 1930–1934 (JSP)
- 2003: Cab Calloway & His Orchestra Volume 2: 1935–1940 (JSP)

=== Charting singles ===
Release date	Title	Chart positions
1930	"Saint Louis Blues"	16
1931	"Minnie the Moocher"	1
1931	"Saint James Infirmary"	3
1931	"Nobody's Sweetheart"	13
1931	"Six or Seven Times"	14
1931	"You Rascal, You"	17
1931	"Kicking the Gong Around"	4
1931	"Between the Devil and the Deep Blue Sea"	15
1931	"Trickeration"	8
1932	"Cabin in the Cotton"	17
1932	"Strictly Cullud Affair"	11
1932	"Minnie the Moocher's Wedding Day"	8
1932	"Reefer Man"	11
1932	"Hot Toddy"	14
1932	"I've Got the World on a String"	18
1933	"I Gotta Right to Sing the Blues"	17
1934	"Jitter Bug"	20
1934	"Moon Glow"	7
1934	"Chinese Rhythm"	7
1935	"Keep That Hi-De-Hi in Your Soul"	20
1936	"You're the Cure for What Ails Me"	20
1936	"Copper Colored Gal"	13
1937	"Wake up and Live"	17
1937	"Congo"	17
1937	"Peckin'"	18
1937	"She's Tall, She's Tan, She's Terrific"	17
1937	"Moon at Sea"	19
1937	"Mama, I Want to Make Rhythm"	20
1938	"Every Day's a Holiday"	18
1938	"Mister Toscanini, Swing for Minnie"	19
1938	"F.D.R. Jones"	14
1938	"Angels with Dirty Faces"	3
1939	"The Ghost of Smokey Joe"	13
1939	"(Hep Hep!) The Jumpin' Jive"	2
1940	"Fifteen Minute Intermission"	23
1941	"Bye Bye Blues"	24
1941	"Geechee Joe"	23
1941	"I See a Million People"	23
1942	"Blues in the Night"	8
1943	"Ogeechee River Lullaby"	18
1944	"The Moment I Laid My Eyes on You"	28
1945	"Let's Take the Long Way Home"	28
1946	"The Honeydripper"	3 (R&B)
1948	"The Calloway Boogie"	13 (R&B)
1956	"Little Child"	62
1966	"History Repeats Itself"	89
1978	"Minnie the Moocher" (disco version)	91 (R&B)

== Stage ==
Year	Production	Location	Role	Notes
1953	Porgy and Bess	Ziegfeld Theatre, New York City	Sportin' Life	
1967	Hello, Dolly!	St. James Theatre, New York City	Horace Vandergelder	Cast replacement on November 12, 1967
1973–1974	The Pajama Game	Lunt-Fontanne Theatre, New York City	Hines	
1976–1977	Bubbling Brown Sugar	ANTA Playhouse, New York City	Calloway provided music	
1986	Uptown... It's Hot!	Lunt-Fontanne Theatre, New York City	Calloway provided music	

== Filmography ==
Features

- The Big Broadcast (1932) – Himself
- International House (1933) – Himself
- The Singing Kid (1936) – Cotton Club Band Leader
- Manhattan Merry-Go-Round (1937) – Cotton Club Orchestra Leader (uncredited)
- Stormy Weather (1943) – Himself
- Sensations of 1945 (1944) – Himself
- Ebony Parade (1947) – Himself (archive footage)
- Hi De Ho (1947) – Himself
- Rhythm and Blues Revue (1955)
- Basin Street Revue (1956) – Himself
- St. Louis Blues (1958) – Blade
- Schlager-Raketen (1960) – Sänger / Himself
- The Cincinnati Kid (1965) – Yeller
- The Littlest Angel (1969) – Gabriel
- The Blues Brothers (1980) – Curtis

Short subjects

- Minnie the Moocher (1932) – Himself – Bandleader (uncredited)
- Snow-White (1933) – Koko the Clown (voice, uncredited)
- The Old Man of the Mountain (1933) – Himself, Old Man
- Betty Boop's Rise to Fame (1934) – Old Man (voice, uncredited)
- Cab Calloway's Hi-De-Ho (1934) – Himself
- Cab Calloway's Jitterbug Party (1935) – Himself
- Hi De Ho (1937) – Himself
- Mother Goose Goes Hollywood (1938)
- Meet the Maestros (1938) – Band Leader, ZaZuZaz number
- Alright by Janet Jackson (1990) – Himself
