= Chocolate Kiddies 1925 European tour =

Three-act Broadway-styled revue

The Chocolate Kiddies is a three-act Broadway-styled revue that, in its inaugural production – from May to September 1925 – toured Berlin, Hamburg, Stockholm, and Copenhagen. The show never actually performed on Broadway, but was conceived, assembled, and rehearsed there. Chocolate Kiddies commissioned new works, but was also an amalgamation and adaptation of several leading African American acts in New York, specifically Harlem, intended to showcase exemplary jazz and African American artistry of the Harlem Renaissance. Early jazz was uniquely American; and, while New Orleans enjoys popularity for being its birthplace, the jazz emerging from Harlem during the Renaissance had, on its own merits, captured international intrigue.

== History ==
The impetus for producing the Chocolate Kiddies was partly a culmination or outgrowth of (i) the success of a Harlem (and Atlantic City) jazz band led by Sam Wooding (1895–1985) and a floor show, initially developed for the 1923 opening of the Nest Club and (ii) the success of Eubie Blake and Noble Sissle's Broadway musical, The Chocolate Dandies, which, after 96 performances, closed November 22, 1924 ... leaving some of the cast available, from which, the Chocolate Kiddies picked up choreographer Charlie Davis and singer Lottie Gee. The cast included singer Adelaide Hall, who came from the Miller and Lyles Broadway production Runnin' Wild, The Three Eddies, Rufus Greenlee and Thaddeus Drayton, Bobbie and Babe Goins, Charles Davis and Sam Wooding and his Orchestra.

Leoni Leonidoff (né Leonid Davydovich Leonidoff-Bermann; born abt. 1886) became the owner-producer of the Chocolate Kiddies tour. He was a Russian-Jewish exile living in Berlin as a theatrical impresario.

Leonidoff's introduction to Wooding was possibly influenced by a Russian-Jewish-born American impresario living in New York, Morris Gest (1875–1942) and his brother and partner, Sam Gest (1889–1960), an impresario living in Berlin. Leonidoff, in 1925, signed Wooding to take his band on a European tour, provided that a musical revue was added.

Russian-born Jewish American impresario Arthur Seymour Lyons (1895–1964) staged an adaptation and, for several weeks prior to departure, rehearsed the company at Bryant Hall. Before settling on the name Chocolate Kiddies, the show had been billed as the Club Alabam Revue and Club Alabam Fantasies. (Note: Club Alabam was a Broadway after-theater jazz club set in a rathskeller of the now bygone 44th Street Theatre at 216 West 44th Street. The club endured since the theater's inception in 1912, originally known as the "Little Club," but became known as "Club Alabam" in 1924 and henceforth flourished with jazz. Following the Prohibition, the bar closed and remained vacant for years. On March 2, 1942 – 2 months and 19 days after the United States officially entered World War II – the American Theatre Wing opened it back up as the Stage Door Canteen for American and Allied servicemen. The property, as of 2019, was owned and managed by the Kushner Companies.)

Duke Ellington, with Jo Trent as lyricist, composed four songs for the production – his first work for a musical revue genre.

=== 1925 Departure ===
After a farewell reception at the Bamville Club in Harlem two days earlier, over 500 theatrical professionals swarmed the White Star Line Pier (either Pier 59 or 60; current site of Chelsea Piers) on May 6, 1925, as Wooding, his band, and the revue performers boarded the SS Arabic and departed for Hamburg.

Members of the revue who did not travel aboard the SS Arabic included Helen Miles, Willie Robbins, Arthur Robbins, Ruth Williams, and Evelyn Dove, who traveled from London. Lottie Gee was aboard as Lottie Kyer – she had been married from 1913 to 1924 to pianist "Peaches" Kyer (né Wilson Harrison Kyer; 1888–1982).

=== Arrival and tour ===
The company arrived in Hamburg May 17, 1925, and traveled to Berlin, arriving May 18 and opened May 25 at the Admiralspalast, where they performed 8 weeks. One of the audience members, 17-year-old Berliner Alfred Lion, later said, "It was the first time I saw colored musicians and heard the music. I was flabbergasted . . . – It was something brand new, but it registered with me right away." Thirteen years later, in 1938, Lions co-founded Blue Note Records in New York. The Chocolate Kiddies Orchestra also did a recording sessions in Berlin June 5–10, 1925, at Vox Records.

On July 28, Chocolate Kiddies opened in Hamburg at the Thalia Theater for 32 performances, ending August 24. Then Stockholm, opening August 25 and closing September 14. The Stockholm performances included a benefit for the Swedish Red Cross, for the brother of the King. Then they performed in Copenhagen in the Circus Building, opening September 15, closing September 25.

=== La Revue Nègre 1925 opening in Paris ===
Hotsy Totsy, a tab dance revue backed by The Charleston Jazz Band, led by Claude Hopkins, renamed La Revue nègre, opened in Paris October 2, 1925. The cast included Will Marion Cook and Josephine Baker. At least one Chocolate Kiddies cast member, Lydia Jones, joined the production.

== Production personnel and cast ==
=== Production ===
Book and staging:

- Arthur Seymour Lyons

Music:

- Joe Trent (né Joseph Hannibal Trent; 1892–1954), lyrics
- Duke Ellington, music
1. "Deacon Jazz" – prior to the 1925 debut of the Chocolate Kiddies, Jo Trent and the Deacons recorded "Deacon Jazz" c. November 1924 in New York; Jo Trent (vocals); Otto Hardwick (C-melody sax); Duke Ellington (piano); George Francis (banjo); Sonny Greer (drums) – discographer Brian Rust lists Fred Guy on banjo; Matrix T-2007-1; Jazz Panorama JPLP12
2. "Jig Walk," Charleston
3. "Jim Dandy"
4. "With You"

Orchestration:

- Arthur Johnston (1898–1954)

Choreographer:

- Charles Davis (né Charles Columbus Davis; 1894–1963) ‡ (Note: Charles Davis aka C. Columbus Davis (1894–1963), when he died, was living in Englewood, New Jersey, at 111 Reis Avenue. His big break came as a principal dancer in Shuffle Along, after which, he rapidly rose to notability as a choreographer at the Apollo and Lafayette Theatres in Harlem. Davis also did the choreography for the 1927 Broadway musical, Rang Tang. He and his wife, Cecile (1898–1975), had two daughters, Meta J. Davis (1919–2012) and Anna L. Davis (1921–2016) (Duke Ellington's Music for the Theatre, by John Childs Franceschina, McFarland & Company, 2000, p. 14; OCLC 469316674))

Set design and costumes:

- Willy Pogany (1882–1955)

Publisher:

- Robbins-Engel; OCLC 498586615

=== Cast ===
Sam Wooding's Orchestra from Club Alabam

1. Sam Wooding, piano, leader
2. Willie Lewis (1905–1971), clarinet
3. Eugene Sedric (1907–1963), clarinet, tenor sax
4. Garvin Bushell (1902–1991), clarinet, alto sax, oboe, bassoon
5. Tommy Ladnier (1900–1939), trumpet
6. Bobby Martin (1903–1983), trumpet
7. Maceo Elmer Edwards (1900–1988), trumpet
8. Herb Flemming (1898–1976), trombone
9. John Warren, tuba
10. Johnny Mitchell, banjo
11. George Howe (1892–1936), (Note: George Howe (aka George Washington Howe; né Robert Washington Howe; 1892–1936), drummer, led the house band at the Nest Club beginning 1927, when Teddy Hill was in the band. Luis Russell replaced Howe in 1928. Howe had been the drummer for Sam Wooding. Howe and fellow musician George E. Dyer (1884–1936), both, in the mid-1930s, living in Glens Falls, drowned November 23, 1936, in the Champlain Canal, near Fort Ann, after a car driven by Howe submerged in the canal as a result of side-swiping a 10-ton truck (U.S. Class 6) towing another 10-ton truck on Comstock Road. They were returning from a gig at a nightclub operated by Maxie Gordon (né Maxime Godon Gordon; 1891–1956) – two miles from Whitehall. They had left Hudson Falls at 1:30 am and were followed by Jimmie Gillespie and banjoist Percy Richardson. Trombonist Benny Morton (1907–1985), also at the gig, decided at the last minute not to ride with Howe and Dyer. Howe was buried at Cypress Hills National Cemetery, Brooklyn.) drums

Huvudroller (Swedish)
(leading roles):

Greenlee & Drayton

1. Rufus Greenlee (1893–1963) (Note: Rufus Greenlee (né Rufus Edward Greenlee; 1893–1963), born in Asheville, North Carolina, became a native of New Haven, Connecticut. From about 1924–1925 to about 1930, he was married to cast member Thelma Greene (see Greene's brief bio in Notes). In Greenlee's post-vaudeville days, beginning in the mid-1930s, until is death, he owned and operated the Monterey Cafe, a jazz venue in New Haven at 265–167 Dixwell Avenue in the Dixwell neighborhood. Johnny "Hammond" Smith's 1962 album, Black Coffee, was recorded there. As a side note, his grand nephew, Lou Jones (1932–2006), was an Olympic Gold Medalist in the 4 × 400 metres relay in the 1956 Summer Games.)
2. Thaddeus "Teddy" Drayton (1893–1964)

The Three Eddies

3. Shakey Beasley (né Clarence Beasley; (1897–1939)
4. Earle "Tiny" Ray (1887–1963)
5. Chick Horsey (1903–1933) (Note: Chick Horsey (né Layburn Horsey; 1903–1933), born in Chester, Pennsylvania, died July 19, 1933, in Naples, Italy, at the Hotel Diana.)

Leading roles (continued)

6. Evelyn Dove (1902–1987)
7. Margaret Sims (maiden 1903–1974) (Note: Margaret Sims (maiden; 1903–1974), born in Washington, D.C., was a blues singer. In 1935, the New York Age stated that she epitomized the complete metamorphosis of the blues singer. She married Broadway producer Irvin Colloden Miller (1884–1975). Her sister, Edith G. Sims (1905–1973), was the second of three wives of actor Jimmy Baskett (1904–1948).)

Bobby and Babe Goins
(acrobatic dancers) (Note: Philadelphia-born Bobby Goins (né Walter Robert Goins; 1902–1986) and Babe (aka "Baby") Goins (née Mary or Marie Hall; born 1906) were a husband-and-wife acrobatic dance team who, with productions, toured Europe several times. Bobby and Babe married April 19, 1925, in Manhattan – seventeen days prior to embarking on the 1925 European tour. That tour, incidentally, was Babe's first break as a performer. Babe, who toured Europe three more times, won celebrated acclaim on all tours. According to an article published by the New York Age (May 18, 1932), Babe was born in Havana, Cuba; tho', some sources give Washington, D.C., as her place of birth. At age three Babe moved to Washington, D.C. Bobby and Babe divorced around 1930. Bobby – on January 13, 1933, in Manhattan – married again to Irene Winifred Bennett (maiden; 1914–1986). Babe – on May 10, 1936, in Manhattan – married again to William F. Joyce, Jr. However, a 1932 article in the New York Age (May 28) stated that Babe and Joyce were married (in 1932). Bobby went on to dance as a member of the Crackerjacks, a dance team that influenced the next-generation of professional dancers in Harlem. Bobby became a member of the American Guild of Variety Artists. Bobby – on January 13, 1933, in Manhattan – married again to Irene Winifred Bennett (maiden; 1914–1986).)

8. Robert Goins (né Walter Robert Goins; 1902–1986)
9. Mary Goins (née Mary or Marie Hall; 1906)

Leading roles (continued)

10. Arthur "Strut" Payne (né Arthur Henry Payne; 1878–1937), baritone
11. Adelaide Hall (1901–1993)
12. Lottie Gee (1886–1973)
13. Charles Davis (1894–1963)
14. George Staton (né George Franklin Staten; 1904–1967)
15. Willy Robbins – In one segment, Robbins and Chick Horsey performed "Two Happy Boys" in blackface. According to recollections of Garvin Bushell, "They sang a song, then they went 'Wah wah, wah wah,' and Bobby Martin emulated their speech with his trumpet. That was a big hit. They were trying to do Johnny Hudgins's act."
16. Jessie Crawford
17. Arabella Fields (1879–1931)
18. Lydia Jones (Note: Lydia Jones was portrayed in a one-woman off-Broadway play, The Sensational Josephine Baker, by Cheryl Howard (née Cheryl Gay Alley; born 1953), wife of Ron Howard)
19. Helen Miles
20. Ruth Williams

Prisbelönta dansöser från New Yorks största Neger teatrar
(Award Winning Dance Shows From New York's Greatest Black Theaters)

21. Allegritta Anderson (1898–1944) (Note: Allegretta Anderson (née Alegretta Summers; 1898–1944) was a Chicago-born actress who – on May 29, 1916, in Chicago – married Julian Kirby Anderson (1895–1954). She later was married to Agaton H. Magboo. She acted in the 1930 film, Georgia Rose.)
22. Viola ("Jap") Branch
23. Pearl Brown
24. Marie Bushell (née Marie Roberts; 1902–1971) (Note: Marie Bushell (née Marie Roberts; 1902–1971) was the first of two wives of Garvin Bushell. They married July 24, 1923, in Manhattan.)
25. Thelma Green (1900–1990), wife of Rufus Greenlee (Note: Thelma Greene (née Thelma M. Contee; 1900–1990) was, from about 1924 to about 1929, married to cast member Rufus Greenlee. Her stage surname was that of her ex-husband, Jesse Warren Greene (born 1898), whom she married around 1918, and with whom she had a daughter, Jessica Iris Greene (1918–2007), who, in 1939, married Edward D. Julian Austin. Thelma, between 1942 and 1946, married Leonard G. Hyman (né Leonard Grimke Hyman; born 1894), who, from 1927 to 1932, had been Head of the Photography Division and Official Photographer at the Tuskegee Institute. Leonard Hyman's predecessors and successors there were distinguished photographers, notably Frances Benjamin Johnston (1862–1952) and C. M. Battey (1873–1927), who he replaced. P. H. Polk (1898–1984) was, at the time, one of Hyman's assistants, and in 1933, succeeded him as Head of Photography.)
26. Bernice Miles (née Bernice M. Miles; 1907–1931)
27. Rita Walker (1905–1983) (Note: Rita Walker (maiden 1905–1983) – on April 9, 1945, in Manhattan – married Dennis Ragland (1896–1971).)
28. Thelma Watkins (maiden; 1906–1954) (Note: Thelma Watkins (maiden; 1906–1954) was born in Philadelphia. At some point, she married James Adrian McDaniel (born c. 1917). The date-of-birth on her birth certificate – November 11, 1906 – differs from the date listed on two ship manifests: 1. SS Arabic, which departed New York May 6, 1925, and arrived in Hamburg May 17, 1925 (Storyville, Vol. 60, August–September 1975, p. 218); 2. SS Nieuw Amsterdam, which departed Boulogne-sur-Mer February 24, 1926, and arrived in New York March 6, 1926 (Ancestry.com))
29. Mamie Savoy
30. Bobbie Vincent (1906–1978) (Note: Bobbie Vincent (née Bobbye Vincson; 1906–1978), born in Kansas City, Missouri, went on to perform with other companies, including 37 performances in Buenos Aires in 1938 with Clarence Robinson's Cotton Club Revue Company, booked by B and B Artists Bureau of Harlem, headed by William B. Cohen and B.L. Burtt (né Bernard Lamberson Burtt; 1884–1944). More than two decades later, she was an official of the X-Glamour Girls revue, composed of former entertainers from the Cotton Club. The company performed in October 26, 1962, at the Riviera Ballroom in New York at Broadway and 53rd Street. One of her older sisters, Flash Amber Vincson (1902–1975), married – on August 23, 1927, in Chicago – vaudeville entertainer Buck Washington (1903–1955) of Buck and Bubbles.)
31. Arthur Robbins

== Selected songs ==
From Act 1
"Night Life in a Negro Cafe in Harlem in New York"

1. "Deacon Jazz," sang by Adelaide Hall with chorus

From Act 2
"Symphonic Concert Jazz Concert by the Sam Wooding Orchestra of the Club Alabam, New York"

1. "Indian Love Call"
2. "St. Louis Blues"
3. "Medley of American Hits"
4. "Shanghai Shuffle" – Vox (audio) (1925 recording)
5. "Alabamy Bound" – Vox (audio) (1925 recording)
6. "O Katharina," L. Wolfe Gilbert (1886–1970) (words), Richard Fall (1882–1945) (music) – Vox 01882; re-released on Jazz Panorama (vinyl) LP 20 (audio) (1925 recording)
7. "By the Waters of Minnetonka," Thurlow Lieurance (1878–1963) (w&m) – Vox; re-released on Jazz Oracle (sv) BDW 8070 (CD Vol. 1 of 3) (audio)

From Act 3

1. "Jim Dandy," a strut dance
2. "With You," sung by Lottie Gee
3. "Jig Walk," Charleston, to which an ensemble danced the Charleston

== Gallery ==
While in Berlin, the band, recorded several selections for the Berlin-based Vox label.

Sam Wooding and His Orchestra aka The Chocolate Kiddies

1925 photo taken at the Vox Phonograph Studio – Sam Wooding and his Orchestra; Seated, left to right: Tommy Ladnier (trumpet), John Warren (tuba) (behind), Sam Wooding (piano/leader), Willie Lewis (reeds), George Howe (1892–1936) (drums). Standing, left to right: Herb Flemming (trombone), Eugene Sedric (reeds), Johnny Mitchell (banjo), Bobby Martin (trumpet), Garvin Bushell (reeds), Maceo Elmer Edwards (1900–1988) (trumpet).
Not pictured: Arthur Lange (1889–1956), Arthur Johnston (1898–1954), arrangers

== Selected subsequent tours ==
- November 1925 – Performance in Vienna, Austria (Raimund theatre)
- 1926 – Chocolate Kiddies 1926 Russian tour
- 1927 – Sam Wooding and the Chocolate Kiddies, with much of the 1925 cast performed in Argentina in 1927 for six months, returning to New York December 3, 1927, aboard the Voltaire (de).
- 1929 – Sam Wooding and His Orchestra, billed as the "Chocolate Kiddies Orchestra," toured Spain in 1929, without the chorus and dancers. They performed in San Sebastián, Madrid, and Barcelona. The tour has been chronicled as Spain's first live jazz performances by Americans. On July 3, 1929, while in Barcelona, the orchestra recorded ten songs for Parlophon. Eight of the songs were recorded twice, to accommodate different record formats.

Musicians: Bobby Martin (1903–1983) (trumpet, vocals), Doc Cheatham (1905–1997) (trumpet, vocals, arranger), Albert Wynn (1907–1973) (trombone), Billy Burns (1904–1963) (trombone), Willie Lewis (1905–1971) (clarinet, alto sax, bari sax, vocals), Jerry Blake (1908–1961) (clarinet, alto sax, vocals), Gene Sedric (1907–1963) (clarinet, tenor sax, vocals), Freddy Johnson (1904–1961) (piano, vocals, arranger), Johnny Mitchell (banjo, guitar), Sumner Leslie "King" Edwards (1894–1957) (tuba, bass), Ted Fields (né Edward Fields; 1905–1959) (drums), Sam Wooding (director)

=== Bibliography ===
- Williams, Iain Cameron Underneath a Harlem Moon: The Harlem to Paris Years of Adelaide Hall. Bloomsbury Publishers, ISBN 0-8264-5893-9. Chapter 6: The Chocolate Kiddies Come to Town – is devoted to the 1925 Chocolate Kiddies tour.
- Bourne, Stephen Evelyn Dove: Britain's Black Cabaret Queen [Jacaranda Books, 2016] ISBN 978-1-909762-35-0. Chapter 4: The Chocolate Kiddies.
