= Vox Records (Germany) =

German record label

Vox-Schallplatten- und Sprechmaschinen A.-G.
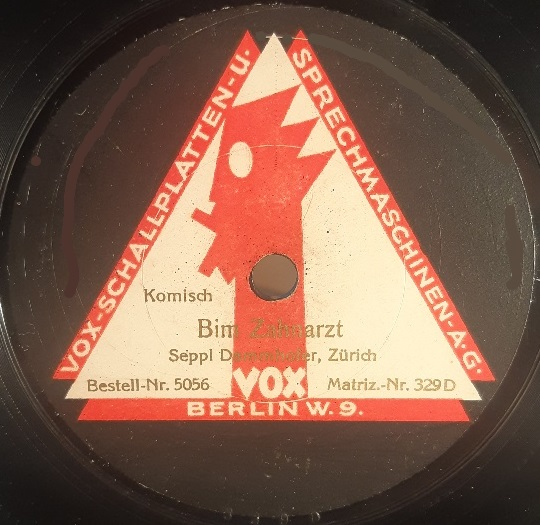
- Vox label designed by Wilhelm Deffke
- Industry: Record label
- Founded: 1921
- Founders: Otto Klung, August Strauch and Curt Stille
- Defunct: 1929
- Headquarters: Potsdamerstrasse 39A, Berlin
- Parent: Hauptgesellschaft für Industrien

Vox AG, officially Vox-Schallplatten- und Sprechmaschinen A.-G., was a German record label and public limited company founded in 1921 by Otto Klung, August Strauch and Curt Stille. It was established for the manufacture of phonographs and shellac records. Vox records feature a triangular label with a stylized depiction of a singer's side profile designed by the graphic and advertising artist Wilhelm Deffke. One source suggests that it issued the first electrical recordings in Germany in late 1924 or early 1925, presumably recorded by a method other than that of Western Electric, but notes that it did not generally adopt electric recording technology until some 18 months later. The company declared bankruptcy in 1929 due to significant competition from larger record labels in Germany.

== Selected sessionography ==
Sam Wooding and His Orchestra aka The Chocolate Kiddies Recorded at Vox Studios, Berlin June 5–10, 1925
Matrix	Music Title	Composer(s) lyricist(s)	Catalog No.
2357–A	"O Katharina"	L. Wolfe Gilbert (words); Richard Fall (music)	Vox 01890
2358–A	"Shanghai Shuffle"	Larry Conley (w&m); Gene Rodemich (w&m)	Vox 01890 audio
2359–A	"Alabamy Bound"	Ray Henderson (music); Buddy DeSylva (words); Bud Green (words)	Vox 01890 audio
2359–	"Alabamy Bound" (alternate take)	Ray Henderson (music); Buddy DeSylva (words); Bud Green (words)	Jazz Panorama LP20
2360–	"By the Waters of Minnetonka"	Thurlow Lieurance (w&m)	Vox 01882
2755–B	"O Katharina"	L. Wolfe Gilbert (words); Richard Fall (music)	Vox 01883
2756–B	"Shanghai Shuffle"	Larry Conley (w&m Gene Rodemich (w&m)	Jazz Panorama LP20
2757–B	"Alabamy Bound"	Ray Henderson (music); Buddy DeSylva (words); Bud Green (words)	Vox 1891

== Gallery ==
Sam Wooding and His Orchestra
akaThe Chocolate Kiddies
(from the Nest Club, Harlem)

1925 photo taken at the Vox Phonograph Studio — Sam Wooding and his Orchestra; Seated, left to right: Tommy Ladnier (trumpet), John Warren (tuba) (behind), Sam Wooding (piano/leader), Willie Lewis (reeds), George Howe (1892–1936) (drums). Standing, left to right: Herb Flemming (trombone), Eugene Sedric (reeds), Johnny Mitchell (banjo), Bobby Martin (trumpet), Garvin Bushell (reeds), Maceo Elmer Edwards (1900–1988) (trumpet).
Not pictured: Arthur Lange (1889–1956), Arthur Johnston (1898–1954), arrangers

== See also ==
- List of record labels
