= The Nest Club =

Bygone Harlem jazz club

The Nest Club was a cabaret in Harlem, more specifically an afterhours club, at 169 West 133rd Street – a street known then both as "Swing Street" (Note: Following the repeal of prohibition in the United States, 52nd Street in Midtown became known as "Swing Street.") and "Jungle Alley" – two doors east of Seventh Avenue, downstairs. The club, operating under the auspices of The Nest Club, Inc., was founded in 1923, co-owned, and operated by John C. Carey (né John Clifford Carey; 1889–1956) and Mal Frazier (né Melville Hunter Frazier; 1888–1967). (Note: One of Mal Frazier's sisters, Hattie Naomi Frazier (1890–1974) was married to Russell Eccles Talmadge Walker (1890–1923), a son of Maggie L. Walker (1864–1934), the first African American woman to charter a bank and serve as its president in the United States.) The club flourished through 1933. The U.S. Prohibition — a nationwide ban on the sale of alcoholic beverages — ran from 1920 to 1933. The club faced a formidable challenge to its viability following the Great Crash of October 1929, followed by the Great Depression that bottomed around March 1933.

== History ==
The Nest Club, 100 feet (30.48 m) east of Seventh Avenue, opened in 1923 with a Leonard Harper revue and Sam Wooding's band. Performers, dressed in bird costumes, did a routine in the theme, "Where do the birds go every night? To the nest! To the nest!" Dance historian Jacqui Malone, in her 1996 book, Steppin' on the Blues: The Visible Rhythms of African American Dance, explained that, at the Nest Club, floor shows were less elaborate than those of larger venues while the emphasis was on the music.

Johnnie Cobb managed the Nest Club from about 1923 to about 1926. Jeff Blood managed it beginning 1927. James Sampson (né James Thomas Sampson; 1876–1948) was business manager. A barbecue restaurant, owned and operated by Carey and Frazier, occupied the ground floor. In 1924, Carey and Frazier also opened on October 23, 1924, and operated the Bamville Club in Harlem at 65 West 129th Street, 2 doors east of Lenox Avenue – where blacks and whites danced in mixed couples.

In 1932, the Rhythm Club, which had been located at 168 West 132nd Street, moved to a room behind the Nest Club. The Nest Club itself closed in 1933.

In 1933, Dickie Wells (né Richard Wells; 1907–1949) (Note: Dickie Wells (né Richard Wells; 1907–1909) had been a dancer in a trio known as Mordecai, Wells, and Taylor – Jimmy Mordecai and Ernest Taylor (died 1934).) (not the trombonist by the same name) took over the lease and opened the Shim Sham Club.

Carey and Frazier, later, owned and operated the Saratoga Club, on Lenox at 140th Street, which had been founded by Casper Holstein (1876–1944).

=== Selected musicians, including houseband members ===
- 1923–1925: Sam Wooding (1895–1985), piano, director. On May 6, 1925, Wooding, his band, and revue performers sailed for Germany aboard the SS Arabic, arriving in Hamburg May 17, 1925, traveling to Berlin, arriving May 18, and opened May 25 at the Admiralspalast, where they performed 8 weeks. During this time, they recorded at Vox Records. On July 28, their revue opened in Hamburg at the Thalia Theater for 32 performances, ending August 24. Then Stockholm, opening August 25, and closing September 14. The Stockholm performances included a benefit for the Swedish Red Cross, for the brother of the King. Then they performed in Copenhagen in the Circus Building, opening September 15, closing September 25.

- 1923–1925: Willie Lewis (1905–1971), clarinet
- 1923–1925: Herb Flemming (1898–1976), trombone
- 1923–1925: Eugene Sedric (1907–1963), clarinet, tenor sax
- 1923–1925: Bobby Martin (1903–1983), trumpet
- 1923–1925: Garvin Bushell (1902–1991), clarinet, alto sax, oboe

- 1925: Elmer Snowden (1900–1973), banjo, director

- 1925: Rex Stewart (1907–1967), trumpet under the direction of Elmer Snowden
- 1925: Prince Robinson (1902–1960), clarinet and saxophone under the direction of Elmer Snowden

- 1925: Billy Butler (né William Henson Butler; 1903–1981), director

- 1925: Demas Dean (1903–1991), trumpet, played when Butler was director
- 1927–1928: Teddy Hill (1909–1978), saxophone, clarinet

- 1926–1927: George Howe (1892–1936), drums, director (Note: George Howe (aka George Washington Howe; né Robert Washington Howe; 1892–1936), drummer, led the house band at the Nest Club beginning 1927, when Teddy Hill was in the band. Luis Russell replaced Howe in 1928. Howe had been the drummer for Sam Wooding. Howe and fellow musician George E. Dyer (1884–1936), both, in the mid-1930s living in Glens Falls, drowned November 23, 1936, in the Champlain Canal, near Fort Ann, after a car driven by Howe submerged in the canal as a result of side-swiping a 10-ton truck (U.S. Class 6) towing another 10-ton truck on Comstock Road. They were returning from a gig at a nightclub operated by Maxie Gordon (né Maxime Godon Gordon; 1891–1956) – two miles from Whitehall. They had left Hudson Falls at 1:30 am and were followed by Jimmie Gillespie and banjoist Percy Richardson. Trombonist Benny Morton (1907–1985), also at the gig, decided at the last minute not to ride with Howe and Dyer. Howe was buried at Cypress Hills National Cemetery, Brooklyn.)
- 1927: Luis Russell (1898–1962), piano, director

- 1928: Barney Bigard (1906–1980) played clarinet for Russell at the Nest Club and Duke Ellington first heard him there
- 1926–1928: Charles Holmes (1910–1985), alto sax, played under George Howe and Louis Russell

- 1928: Harry White (1898–1962), trombone, director

- 1929–1930: Hannah Sylvester (1903–1973), blues singer
- 1927–1927: Ed (aka "Andy") Anderson (né Donnell Edward Anderson; 1903–1983), trumpet
- Danny Barker (1909–1894), guitar
- Mattie Hite (1890–1935), singer
- Johnny Hudgins (1896–1990), vaudeville performer
- Marjorie Sipp (maiden; 1889–1944) (Note: Marjorie Sipp (1889–1944) was a singer, acclaimed by the black press, and also by Carl Van Vechten and Donald Angus (né Evan Donald Angus; 1899–1988). Sipp made no recordings and appeared only at The Nest.)
- 1920s: Lizzie Miles (1895–1963)
- 1932: Lorenzo Tio, Jr. (1893–1933), clarinet, alongside Sidney Bechet
- 1932: Sidney Bechet (1897–1959), saxophone

==== Billie Holiday ====
In the late 1920s, Billie Holiday, under her birth name, Eleanora Fagan, sang for tips at small Harlem venues, namely the Nest Club, Pod's and Jerry's, the Yeah Man (1925–1960) (Note: Yeah Man, a jazz venue at 2350 Seventh Avenue, between 137th and 137th Street, across the street from the Renaissance Ballroom & Casino, became Jock's Place in the late 1930s.) at 2350 Seventh Avenue at 138th Street, and Monette's at 148 West 133rd (1926–). Microphones to amplify vocalist were not yet used in Harlem nightclubs.

Mae Barnes, a singer and dancer, reminisced about the first time she heard Eleanora sing. Both she and Eleanora had been performing at the Nest. Barnes said, "Billie wasn't doing her own style. She was doing everything that Louis Armstrong was doing. She knew his records backwards ... She wasn't imitatin' his style, she was using all his numbers. That was her beginnin' of changing Louis's style to her own ... "

She had this heavy voice, this gravelly tone. While at the Nest Club, Eleanora changed her name to Billie Holiday, drawing on the pseudonym of one her favorite actors, Billie Dove, and the surname of her father, Clarence Holiday. Side note: Music writer Donald Clarke avers that Holiday adopted her first name from a jazz vocal team, Billie Haywood (1903–1979) and Cliff Allen who, had been singing at a Harlem venue. Haywood was, according to Barnes, a hell of a rhythm singer. (Note: The term "rhythm singer" is more apropos with the Swing era, which began around 1933. During that period, bands commonly featured a female and male vocalist; generally one singer primarily sang straight renditions of ballads, while the other was more of a rhythm singer, someone who swung tunes. It's not clear whether Mae Barnes meant that Billie Haywood was a "hell of a rhythm singer" in the late 1920s or early 1930s, or later. [Yanow, Scott (2000). Bebop. Miller Freeman, Inc. p. 172 – via Google Books. OCLC 47008488 (all editions)].)

=== Radio broadcasts ===
In 1925, the Nest Club Orchestra, directed by Billy Butler, nationally broadcast their performances Tuesday and Saturday evenings, 11:30 to midnight, from host WFBH, a short-lived Manhattan radio station in existence from July 15, 1924, to November 6, 1926.

=== Prohibition ===
During the Prohibition, many cabarets across the country were speakeasies. And, at the time, many in Harlem's Swing Street district have been chronicled as having been controlled by organized crime.The extent to which the Nest Club operated (i) as a speakeasy or (ii) under the duress of organized crime is not well-chronicled.

However, Michael Aloysius Lerner, in his 2007 book, Dry Manhattan: Prohibition in New York City, pointed out that the Amsterdam News and the New York Age both argued that cabarets in Harlem had been unfairly targeted by prohibition enforcement officers. Yet, not a single venue in Harlem had been padlocked until September 1928, when the Nest Club was closed for violating the Volstead Act. When Police Commissioner Grover Whalen ordered a massive citywide crackdown on speakeasies in 1929, 45 of the 786 clubs were in Harlem, a ratio that, according to Lerner, "suggests Harlem was neither ignored nor specifically targeted."

=== Building demolished ===
The building at 169 West 133rd Street, a 2-story structure with a basement, was demolished in 2012. In 2009 and 2012, the fabric awning over the front door – dark brown with white lettering – had the words "Brown's Palace."

=== New building ===
In 2015, on the same lot with the same address, a newly erected six-story, 10,385 square feet (964.8 m^{2}), healthcare clinic named "The Nest" opened under the auspices of Harlem United, a New York non-profit founded in 1988 during the throes of the HIV/AIDS epidemic in New York. The Nest has exams rooms, dental operatories, a floor dedicated to behavioral health, and a floor for pediatric care. The staff uses the facility to offer primary care for the lesbian, gay, bisexual, queer, and transgender community as well as provide treatment and care for individuals with viral hepatitis. As of April 2020, leadership of Harlem United included Jacquelyn Kilmer, Chief Executive Officer; Marvin Griffith, Chairman; and Douglass J. Dukeman, Chairman of HU's Upper Room AIDS Ministry, Inc.

Harlem United (official site)

=== Other notable occupants, later ===
In the 1970s, the LaRocque Bey Dance Company, founded in 1960, was listed at 169 West 133rd Street. Bey (né LaRocque Norvel Wright; 1937–1990) was an African American choreographer, dancer, percussionist, composer, and founder of the Harlem dance school and theater bearing his name that, as of 2026, still endures, currently located at the Malcolm Shabazz Cultural Center at 102 West 116th Street at Malcolm X Boulevard (Lenox Avenue).'

== Anecdotes ==
In the early days at the Nest Club, gangsters would come in at three o'clock in the morning and they'd hang there until 10 or 11 o'clock in the next day . . . sitting there and requesting numbers and passing out money.

— Charlie Holmes, saxophonist

The sole purpose of these clubs, according to Malcolm X, was 'to entertain and jive the white night crowd to get their money'

== Gallery ==
Musicians of the Nest Club

1925 photo taken at the Vox Phonograph Studio, Berlin — Sam Wooding and His Orchestra; seated, left to right: Tommy Ladnier (trumpet), John Warren (tuba) (behind), Sam Wooding (piano/leader), Willie Lewis (alto sax, bari sax, vocals), George Howe (drums). Standing, left to right: Herb Flemming (trombone), Eugene Sedric (clarinet, tenor sax), Johnny Mitchell (banjo), Bobby Martin (trumpet), Garvin Bushell (clarinet, alto sax, oboe), Maceo Elmer Edwards (1900–1988) (trumpet).

== Other music venues in the area ==
- Pod's and Jerry's (1925–1948), 133rd Street
- Renaissance Ballroom & Casino (1924–1979), 2341–2349 Adam Clayton Powell Jr. Boulevard, on the east-side of the boulevard between 137th and 138th Streets
- Savoy Ballroom (1926–1958), 596 Lenox Avenue, between 140th and 141st Streets
- Smalls Paradise (1925–1980s), 2294 Seventh Avenue, at 135th Street
- St. Nick's Pub (1930s–still operating), 773 St. Nicholas Avenue, at 149th Street, in the Sugar Hill neighborhood of Harlem
