= Jerry Blake =

American jazz musician (1908–1961)

- Born: Jacinto Chabania; January 23, 1908; Gary, Indiana, U.S.
- Origin: Nashville, Tennessee, U.S.
- Died: December 31, 1961 (aged 53)
- Genres: Jazz
- Instruments: Alto saxophone, clarinet

Jerry Blake (January 23, 1908 – December 31, 1961) was an American jazz alto saxophonist and clarinetist.

== Early life ==
Blake was born "Jacinto Chabania" in Gary, Indiana and grew up in Nashville, Tennessee. He played violin before switching to reeds.

== Career ==
In 1924, Blake toured with the Sells Floto Circus, but was left stranded in Chicago. He later joined Al Wynn's band, played with Bobby Lee and Charlie Turner, and toured Europe in 1928 and 1929 as a member of Sam Wooding's ensemble. In the 1930s, he played in the U.S. with Chick Webb, Zack Whyte, and Don Redman (1933–34) before returning to Europe to play with Willie Lewis in 1934 and 1935. Once more in the United States, he spent time playing with Claude Hopkins, Fletcher Henderson (1936–38), and Cab Calloway (1938–42); he served as Calloway's musical director for part of that period.

In the early-1940s, Blake played with Count Basie, Earl Hines, Lionel Hampton, and Redman. Around 1943, Blake had a mental breakdown and was unable to play again for the rest of his life, most of which he spent in mental institutions. He never recorded as a leader.

== Bibliography ==
- Scott Yanow, Jerry Blake at Allmusic
- Jazz Link Enterprises
