= Arthur Lyons =

Arthur Lyons may refer to:

- Arthur Lyons (writer) (1946–2008), American fiction writer
- Arthur S. Lyons (1895–1963), actors talent agent
