= Billy Burns (trombonist) =

American jazz trombonist

- Born: Henry William Burns c. 1904; Cleveland, Ohio, U.S.
- Died: December 1963 (aged 59) New York City, New York, U.S.
- Genres: Jazz
- Instruments: Trombone

Henry William Burns (c. 1904 – December 1963) was an American jazz trombonist.

== Career ==
Burns worked early in his career with Sam Wooding in Upstate New York and toured Europe with Wooding in 1929. He continued playing in Europe in 1930 as a member of Noble Sissle's band, and was part of recording sessions with Sissle in New York City in 1931. He also received an offer to play with Paul Whiteman. He spent most of the 1930s playing in Europe, playing principally with Willie Lewis, and also with Fud Candrix and Freddy Johnson. He also played with Bill Coleman in Egypt in 1938. In 1941, he moved back to the United States, and was less active in performance thereafter.
