= Johnny Dunn =

American jazz trumpeter (1897–1937)

Johnny Dunn (February 19, 1897 – August 20, 1937) was an American traditional jazz trumpeter and vaudeville performer, who was born in Memphis, Tennessee. He is probably best known for his work during the 1920s with musicians such as Perry Bradford or Noble Sissle. He has been compared in sound and style to both King Oliver and Louis Armstrong. In 1922, he recorded as a member of Mamie Smith's Jazz Hounds, together with Garvin Bushell, Coleman Hawkins, Everett Robbins, Bubber Miley and Herb Flemming.

== As bandleader ==
As a bandleader, he led the following lineups:

- Johnny Dunn's Original Jazz Hounds (1921-3): Perry Bradford, Herschel Brassfield, Elmer Chambers, Charlie Dixon, Earl Granstaff, Ernest Ellis, Herb Flemming, Robert Horton, Harry Hull, Charles E. Jackson, George Mitchell, Rollen Smith, Dan Wilson, Sam Wooding, George Rickson, and Bob Ricketts (arranger)
- Johnny Dunn and his Jazz Band (1923): Sam Speed, Leroy Tibbs, others unknown
- Johnny Dunn and his Original Jazz Band (1923): Perry Bradford, Herschel Brassfield, Earl Granstaff, Harry Hull, George Mitchell, Rollen Smith, George Rickson, Sam Speed and Jesse Baltimore
- Edith Wilson and Johnny Dunn's Jazz Hounds (1921-4): Dope Andrews, Garvin Bushell, Herschel Brassfield, Ernest Elliot, Herb Flemming, Harry Hull, Leroy Parker, Edith Wilson, Dan Wilson
- Johnny Dunn and his Band (1928): Garvin Bushell, Herb Flemming, James P. Johnson, John Mitchell, Jelly Roll Morton, Mort Perry, and Fats Waller

== Recordings ==
In 1928, Dunn recorded four tracks with Jelly Roll Morton, and two more with both James P. Johnson and Fats Waller. Although he is either the bandleader or is featured on many recordings from about 1923 on, he never made any more recordings after 1928, and relocated permanently to Europe.

== Personal life ==
Dunn died of tuberculosis aged 40 in Paris, France in August 1937, but his playing style was so out of fashion, that he was largely forgotten by that time.

== Influence ==
In 1921, Dunn's trumpet playing style, with a plunger, inspired Tricky Sam Nanton to use the plunger with the trombone. This became known as the wah-wah effect. Two stories circulate about Dunn's visit to the Sunset Café to embarrass a young Louis Armstrong. In one story, Dunn stumbled around an unfamiliar key after asking Armstrong to yield his horn; in another story, Dunn and Armstrong dueled by alternating choruses until Armstrong won.
