= Stereo nightclub =

Nightclub in Montreal, Canada

Stereo
- Interactive map of Stereo
- Address: 858 rue Ste-Catherine est
- Location: Montreal, Quebec, Canada
- Coordinates: 45.5159°N 73.5581°W
- Owner: Thomas Piscardelli and Mike Rein
- Capacity: 700
- Type: Nightclub
- Events: House, Techno

Construction
- Opened: 1998

Website
- www.stereonightclub.net

Stereo is a nightclub and afterhours club in Montreal, Quebec which primarily features house and techno music. The nightclub is known for its sound system and loyal following. Stereo has ranked among the top nightclubs in North America and internationally.

Stereo was founded in 1998 by DJ-producer Angel Moraes and is currently owned by Tommy Piscardelli. The nightclub has a two floor configuration with the afterhours portion of the club located on the upper floor and a smaller nightclub 'StereoBar' which serves alcohol during sanctioned hours on the lower floor. The nightclub has twice been a target of arson which forced the club to close for repairs in 2008. The reopening, scheduled for September 4, 2009, was delayed due to a second arson attack.

The nightclub has a zero-tolerance policy on the drug GHB which is often used as a date rape drug. Stereo permanently bars any patrons caught in possession of the drug.

== See also ==
- List of electronic dance music venues
- List of LGBTQ bars
- Rave
