= 133rd Street (New York City) =

West-east street in New York City

Coordinates: 40°48′50″N 73°56′41″W

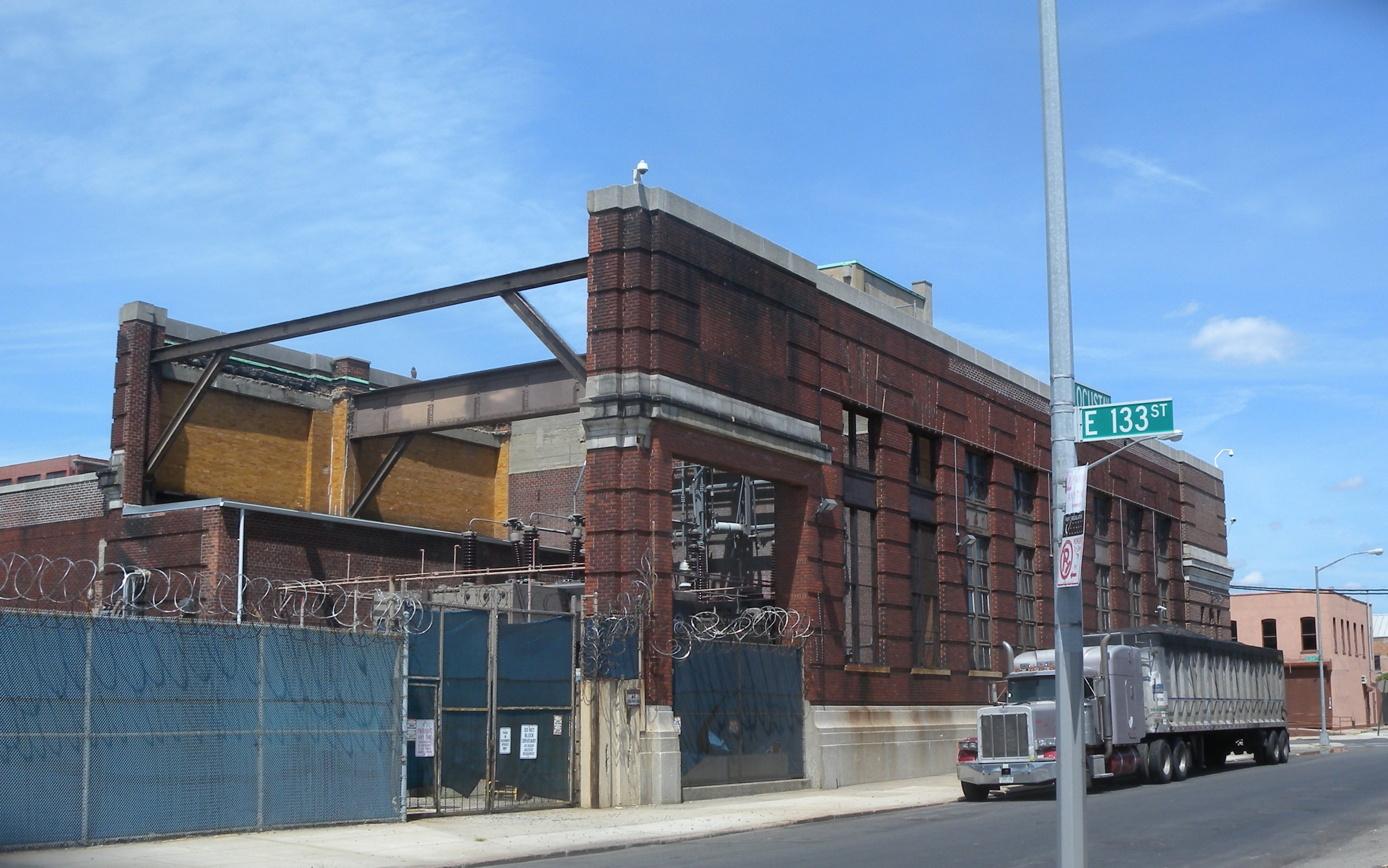
- The electric substation on 133rd Street in the Bronx
- Interactive map of 133rd Street
- Location: Manhattan and the Bronx
- West end: Riverside Drive (Manhattan); Bruckner Boulevard and St. Ann's Place (Bronx)
- Major junctions: Broadway, Seventh Avenue
- East end: Lenox Avenue/Malcolm X Boulevard (Manhattan); Locust Avenue (Bronx)

133rd Street is a street in Manhattan and the Bronx, New York City. In Harlem, Manhattan, it begins at Riverside Drive on its western side and crosses Broadway, Amsterdam Avenue, and ends at Convent Avenue, before resuming on the eastern side, crossing Seventh Avenue, and ending at Lenox Avenue. In Port Morris in the Bronx, it runs from Bruckner Boulevard/St. Ann's Place to Locust Avenue.

The block between Seventh Avenue and Lenox Avenues was once a thriving night spot, known as "Swing Street", with numerous cabarets, jazz clubs, and speakeasies.

The street is described in modern times as "a quiet stretch of brownstones and tenement-style apartment houses, the kind of block that typifies this section of central Harlem".

== History ==
The street has historical significance during the Prohibition era when there were many speakeasies operating on the street and it was known as "Swing Street". The street also gained a reputation as "Jungle Alley" because of "inter-racial mingling" on the street.

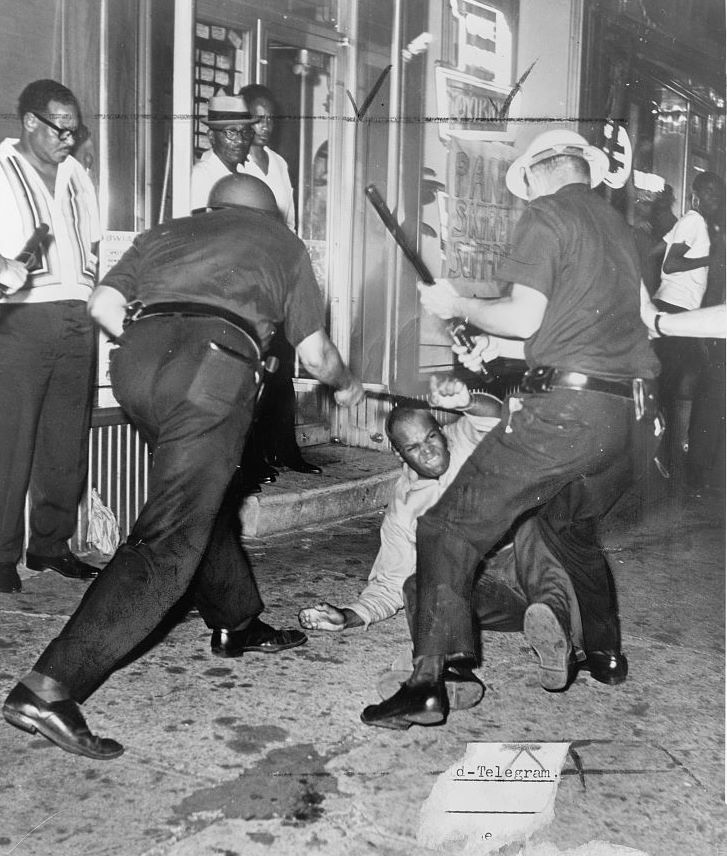
An incident during the Harlem Riot of 1964 at the corner of 133rd Street and Seventh Avenue

During the Jazz Age there were at least 20 jazz clubs on the street, mainly concentrated between Lenox Avenue (Malcolm X Boulevard) and Seventh Avenue, and a young Billie Holiday performed here and was discovered here at the age of 17. Holiday has cited 133rd Street as the original Swing Street, playing a major role in the development of African-American entertainment in Harlem and jazz. The Nest Club opened in 1923 when Melville Frazier and John Carey leased the building at 169 West 133rd Street and established the Barbecue Club on the main floor and The Nest on the downstairs floor, which opened on October 18, 1923.

Jazz historian Frank Driggs described the club as having a "Chicago gangland atmosphere". Nightclubs of note include Tillie's Chicken Shack, known for torch singer Elmira, Bank's Club, Harry Hansberry's Clam House at 146 W. 133rd St., one of New York City's most notorious LGBT speakeasies established in 1928, featuring Gladys Bentley in a tuxedo singing "her own risque lyrics to popular songs", and Catagonia Club, better known as Pod's and Jerry's, which featured jazz pianist and composer Willie "The Lion" Smith.

The street began to lose its attraction following the repeal of Prohibition in 1933, and the Harlem Riot of 1935 effectively killed the reputation of the street as a racial safe haven and most of the interracial clubs were forced to close. One of the last clubs to stay open was Pod's and Jerry's, which was renamed "The Log Cabin" in 1933, and stayed open until about 1948-9, long after 52nd Street had replaced 133rd Street as the "Swing street". Further racial violence broke out at 133rd Street and Seventh Avenue during the Harlem Riot of 1964.

== Landmarks ==
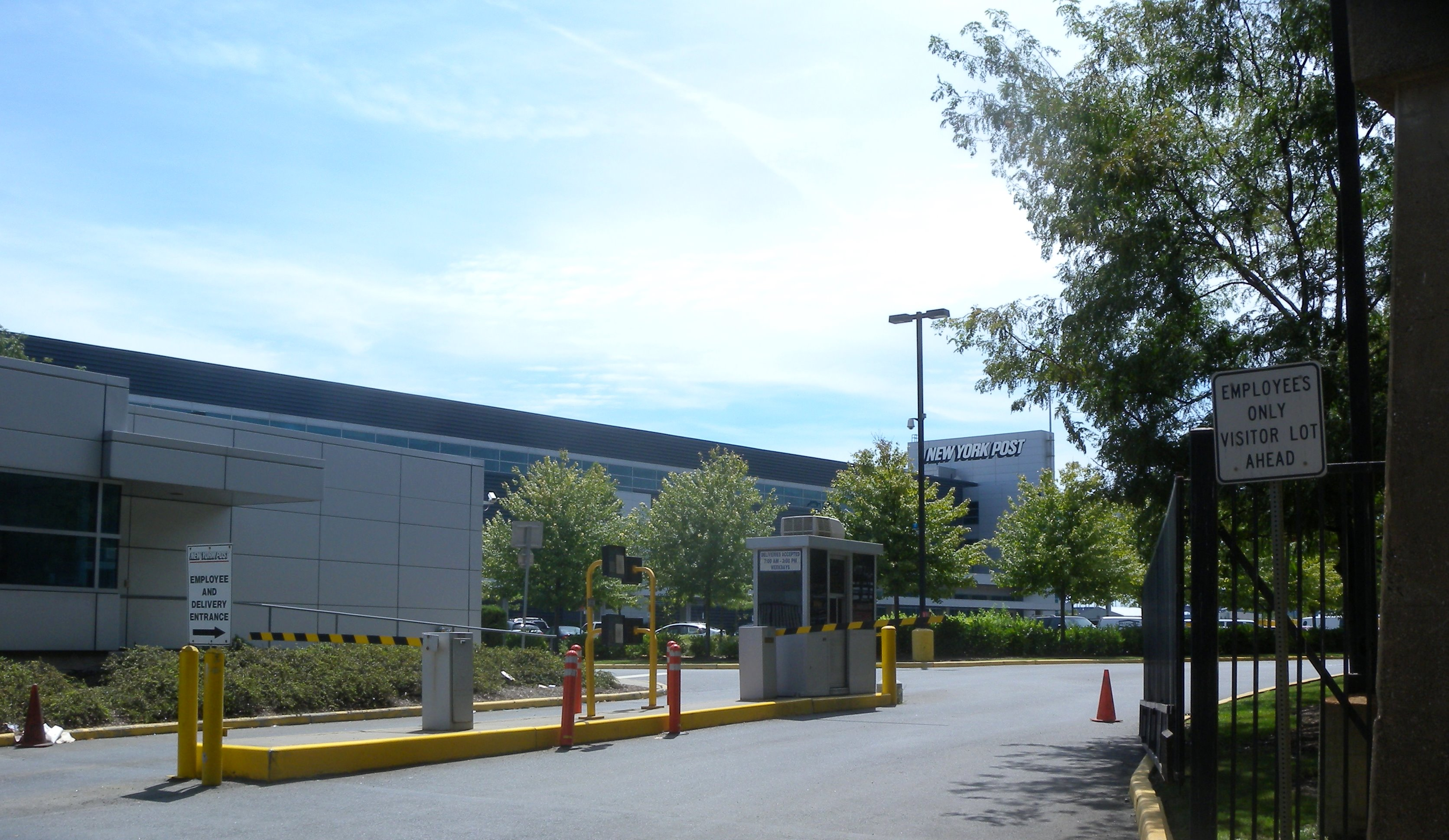
The New York Post printing building

Numerous mills sprang up along the street on the eastern side but many of the former derelict buildings have been razed to the ground and new buildings erected. The New York Post has a printing centre here. On the western side is the Terence D. Tolbert Educational Complex and Roberto Clemente School, KIPP Infinity Charter School and the Manhattanville Bus Depot. The New York Structural Biology Center is situated in the Park Building at 89 Convent Avenue opposite the street.

On the eastern side is Bethlehem Moriah Baptist Church and Bill's Place, a jazz club established in 2006 by tenor saxophonist Bill Saxton in a building which was the former speakeasy Tillie's Chicken Shack. Bishop R.C. Lawson once had a Bible book store on 133rd Street.

== See also ==
- List of numbered streets in Manhattan
