= Millboro School =

Historic school complex in Virginia, US

- U.S. National Register of Historic Places
- Virginia Landmarks Register
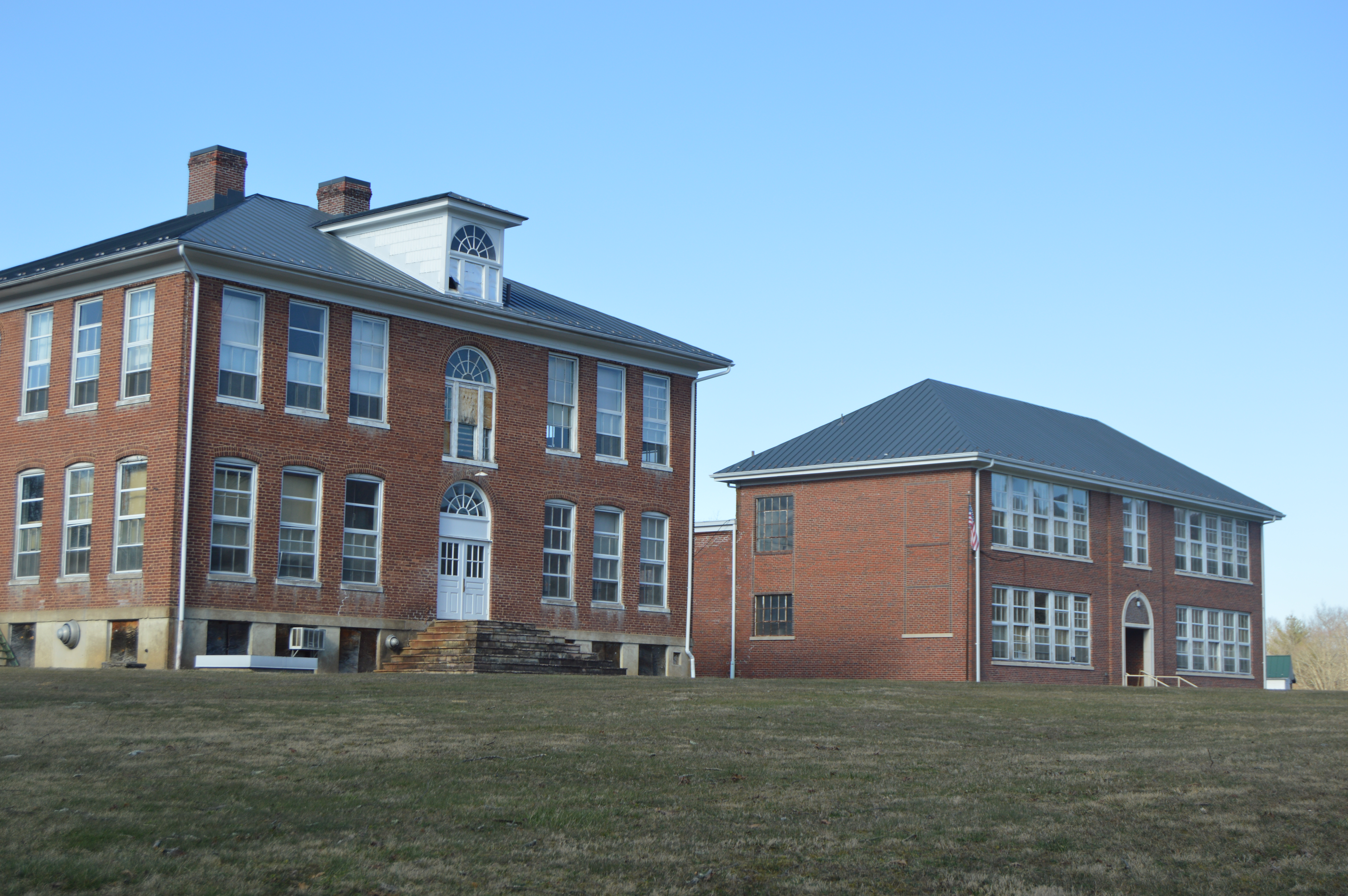
- Overview from the southwest

- Location within Virginia Location within the United States
- Location: Junction of High and Main Streets in Millboro, Virginia
- Coordinates: 37°58′43″N 79°36′12″W
- Area: 6.7 acres (2.7 ha)
- Built: 1916-1918, 1933, 1936, 1962
- Built by: Virginia State Board of Education; Hinnant, Addison, and Hinnant
- Architectural style: Colonial Revival
- NRHP reference No.: 03001439
- VLR No.: 008-5024

Significant dates
- Added to NRHP: January 16, 2004
- Designated VLR: September 10, 2003

Millboro School, also known as Millboro Elementary School, Millboro High School, and Bath County High School, is a historic school complex located at Millboro, Bath County, Virginia. It was built in three phases. The original two-story, brick school building dates from 1916–1918. The Colonial Revival style building has a standing-seam metal hipped roof, with two tall central chimneys and a central hipped dormer. In 1933, a separate two-story, hipped roof, brick classroom structure with a gymnasium/auditorium wing was constructed to the east of the original building. The two structures were connected in 1962, with the addition of a one-story building. Also on the property is a contributing Home Economics Cottage (1933) and Agricultural Instruction Building (1936). The school closed in 1989.

The complex was listed on the National Register of Historic Places in 2004.
