= Henry (Bass) Edwards =

American jazz musician (1889-1965)

- Born: Henry Edwards; February 22, 1889; Atlanta, Georgia, US
- Died: August 22, 1965 (aged 76) New York City
- Genres: Jazz; Classical music
- Occupation: Musician
- Instruments: Tuba, Double Bass
- Formerly of: Duke Ellington Orchestra, Fats Waller

Henry "Bass" Edwards was an American tuba player and string bassist. He began playing as a teen in an Odd Fellows band in Atlanta, Georgia, and later attended Morris Brown College and Morehouse College where he studied music. He served with the U.S. Army Bands in World War I, including a spell with Lt. James Tim Brymn's "Black Devils", the regimental band of the 350th Field Artillery. After the war, he played in dance bands in Philadelphia and Atlantic City. Edwards joined Duke Ellington in 1925, but stayed less than a year. During that time, he was considered an excellent jazz soloist and "the best-trained musician in the band". He appeared on several recordings including East St. Louis Toodle-Oo and Black and Tan Fantasy. Although he played tuba with Ellington, he was replaced by Wellman Braud on string bass.

After Ellington, Edwards recorded with Clarence Williams. He later worked with Leon Abbey in New York and toured South America with him in 1927. He also worked with the Allie Ross Orchestra, including the Blackbirds shows on Broadway. In 1929, he joined Noble Sissle on a European tour. Returning to New York, he worked with Fats Waller, James P. Johnson, and Eubie Blake, before rejoining Allie Ross for Rhapsody in Black on Broadway. In 1933, he was with the Charlie Matson Orchestra.

In later years, he worked little on tuba, but played upright bass with a variety of classical ensembles such as the WNYC Symphony Orchestra and the New York Symphonic Band.
