= Angel Moraes =

American DJ (1965–2021)

Angel Luis Morales
- Born: August 7, 1965; Brooklyn, New York, U.S.
- Died: February 27, 2021 (aged 55)
- Occupation: DJ producer

Angel Moraes (August 7, 1965 – February 27, 2021) was an electronic music DJ from Brooklyn, New York.

== Career ==
He began his career in the 1980s and was the DJ at NYC nightclubs. He formed the record label Hot 'N' Spycy in 1993. One of his own first releases on the label was "Release Yourself". In 1995 his single "Heaven Knows" reached number 25 on Billboard's Dance charts, and in 1996 his track "Burnin' Up" reached number 41 on the same chart. In 1996 his label began a distribution deal with UK label Subversion Records. Over his career he co-created music with other electronica musicians, including Junior Vasquez. As a remixer, he worked with musicians including Pet Shop Boys, k.d. lang, Roy Davis Jr., Jaydee, and Funky Green Dogs.

== Stereo nightclub ==
In 1998, Moraes became the co-founder of Stereo nightclub in Montreal, and released the live album Back From Stereo in 2000.

== Death ==
Moraes died on February 27, 2021, at the age of 55.
