= Wellman Braud =

American jazz double bassist (1891–1966)

- Also known as: Wellman Breaux
- Born: January 25, 1891; St. James Parish, Louisiana, United States
- Died: October 29, 1966 (aged 75) Los Angeles, California
- Genres: Jazz
- Occupations: Musician, bandleader
- Instruments: Double bass, trombone, tuba, violin
- Years active: 1910–1966
- Formerly of: Duke Ellington, Jimmie Noone, Wilber Sweatman, Spirits of Rhythm

Wellman Braud (January 25, 1891 – October 29, 1966) was an American jazz upright bassist. His family sometimes spelled their last name "Breaux", pronounced "Bro".

== Biography ==
Born in St. James Parish, Louisiana, Braud settled in New Orleans, in his early teens. He was playing the violin and the upright bass and leading a trio in venues in the Storyville District before 1910. He moved to Chicago, Illinois in 1917. In 1923, he visited London with the Plantation Orchestra, in which he doubled on bass and trombone. Next, he moved to New York City, where he played with Wilber Sweatman's band before joining Duke Ellington, replacing Henry (Bass) Edwards.

It has been observed by Branford Marsalis that Braud was the first to utilize the walking bass style, that has been a mainstay in modern jazz, as opposed to the 'two-beat' pattern the tuba plays in the New Orleans style. His vigorous melodic bass playing, alternately plucking, slapping, and bowing, was an important feature of the early Ellington Orchestra in the 1920s and 1930s. Braud's playing on Ellington's regular radio broadcasts and recordings helped popularize the slap style of string bass playing, as well as encouraging many dance bands of the time to switch from using a tuba to an upright bass. (Like many of his contemporary New Orleans bassists, Braud doubled on tuba, and he recorded with that instrument on some sides with Ellington).

In 1936, Braud co-managed a short-lived Harlem club with Jimmie Noone, and recorded with the group Spirits of Rhythm from 1935 to 1937. He played with other New York bands including those of Kaiser Marshall, Hot Lips Page, and Sidney Bechet, and returned for a while to Ellington in 1944. In 1956, he joined the Kid Ory Band. In the late 1950s, he joined Barbara Dane's trio alongside pianist/cornetist Kenny Whitson, turning down opportunities to return to Duke Ellington's band or tour with Louis Armstrong.

He is a distant relative of the Marsalis brothers on their mother's side.

He died in Los Angeles, California, at the age of 76.

Duke Ellington subsequently paid tribute to Braud, including the composition ‘Portrait of Wellman Braud' on his 1970 album New Orleans Suite.
