= Zack Whyte =

American jazz bandleader (1898–1967)

Zack Whyte (sometimes spelled Zach Whyte) (1898 – March 10, 1967) was an American jazz bandleader, best known for leading the territory band the Chocolate Beau Brummels.

== Biography ==
Whyte was born in 1898 in Richmond, Kentucky. He studied at Wilberforce University, where he played banjo with Horace Henderson and arranged pieces for him. He led his own Cincinnati-based bands from the early 1920s, and put together the Chocolate Beau Brummels late in the decade. This ensemble recorded for Gennett, Supertone, and Champion in 1929, amounting to about ten tunes. Some of the recordings were released under the names "Eddie Walker & His Band" and "Smoke Jackson & His Red Onions". Whyte died on March 10, 1967, in Kentucky

Among those who played in Whyte's bands were Herman Chittison, Jerry Blake, Truck Parham, Sy Oliver, Roy Eldridge, Vic Dickenson, and Al Sears.

== Discographical note ==
- 1927-33 VV AA Richmond Rarities (Recorded In Richmond, Indiana 1927-33) (Jazz Oracle BDW80008, ?). Contains the complete Zack Whyte recorded legacy plus Alex Jackson, Alphonse Trent and Red Perkins' complete recordings.
