= Elmer Chambers =

American jazz trumpeter (1897–1952)

- Also known as: Frog, Muffle Jaws Chambers
- Born: Dallas Elmer Chambers; 1897; Bayonne, New Jersey, United States
- Died: 1952 (aged 54–55) Jersey City, New Jersey, United States
- Genres: Jazz
- Occupation: Trumpeter
- Instrument: Trumpet
- Years active: Late 1910s – 1930s

Dallas Elmer Chambers, also called Frog and Muffle Jaws Chambers (1897, Bayonne, New Jersey - ca. 1952, Jersey City, New Jersey) was an American jazz trumpeter.

Chambers played in marching bands while serving in World War I, where he met bandleader Sam Wooding. He played with Wooding in Atlantic City, Detroit, and New York City, but left his service before Wooding's tours abroad. In 1923 he began playing with Fletcher Henderson in both large and small ensembles, and played on recordings behind the blues singers Alberta Hunter, Rosa Henderson, Clara Smith, and Ida Cox. He played with Louis Armstrong, and recorded with him on sessions for Decca, Verve, and Paramount. While with Armstrong he played alongside Coleman Hawkins, Don Redman, Buster Bailey, and Joe Smith.

Chambers left Henderson in 1926 and played subsequently in the bands of Ellsworth Reynolds (1926), Billy Fowler (1926–27), and Russell Wooding (1930). He played in pit orchestras, in touring revues, and with Fats Waller, Sidney Bechet, and June Cole before going into semi-retirement in the 1930s.
