= Garnet Clark =

American jazz musician (1917–1938)

Garnet Clark, sometimes credited as Garnett Clark (February 16, 1917 – November 30, 1938), was an American jazz pianist.

Clark began playing professionally in his birthplace of Washington, D.C., United States, at age 16 in Tommy Myles's band. By 1934, he was playing regularly in New York City clubs; in the mid-1930s he recorded with Alex Hill and Charlie Barnet. Benny Carter was playing with Barnet at the time, and he and Clark decided to quit Barnet's group and move to Europe in 1935 with Willie Lewis. While there he recorded with Django Reinhardt, although it was noted with only a hint of the prowess exhibited in New York, and also with Bill Coleman, but soon after left this group to play solo. He accompanied Adelaide Hall in Switzerland in the mid-1930s.

In 1937, he suffered a nervous breakdown, ending his career. Clark died soon after, in St Rémy, Haute-Saône, France, in November 1938, at the age of 21.
