= Bobby Lee (musician) =

American steel guitarist

Bobby Lee (Robert Paul Lee born 1949, died 2023), was a pedal steel guitar player and active promoter of the instrument, creating several Internet websites and most recognized as the founder of the website the Steel Guitar Forum.

Inspired by the steel guitar styles of Jerry Garcia and Don Helms, Bobby Lee took up the steel guitar in 1972. He started performing with country bands in Northern California in 1975, and became a common fixture in Sonoma County's country music scene starting in 1979. His country band affiliations included The Cowpokes, The Western Rhythm Gang, The Wheelers, Scott Gerber, The StringBusters and The Country All-Stars, among many others. In 1996, he recorded and produced Quasar Steel Guitar, a CD of his steel guitar music.

In 2001, Bobby Lee joined John Reese and Open Hearts, a band that plays original music in a wide variety of styles. He played on two of their CDs, and left the band in 2008. In 2009, he created The Burnside Scramblers with Al Stern, Ehlert Lassen, and Dennis Lassen. The band focused on western swing music and standards.

As "b0b" (his online handle), Bobby became involved in BBSes in the 1980s. He used that experience to start The Steel Guitar Forum in 1997. Over the years that followed, The Steel Guitar Forum has become the online center of the international steel guitar community.

In addition to his musical and internet activities, Bobby Lee was a professional software engineer specializing in consumer graphics applications.
