= St. Cecilia Academy =

- U.S. National Register of Historic Places
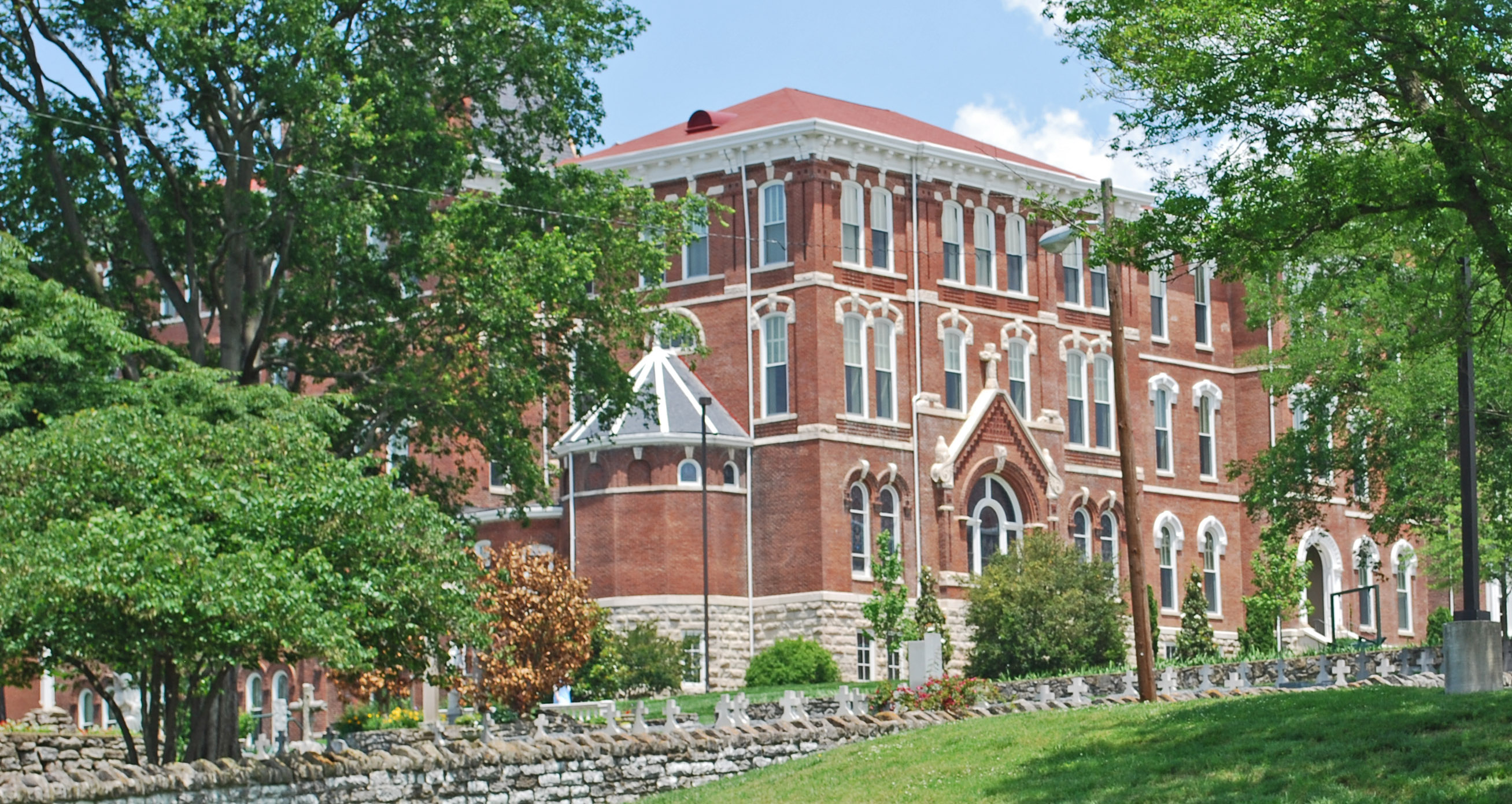
- The St. Cecilia Academy in 2010

- Location within Tennessee
- Location: 8th Avenue and Clay Street, Nashville, Tennessee
- Coordinates: 36°11′10″N 86°48′1″W
- Area: 20.8 acres (8.4 ha)
- Built: 1862
- NRHP reference No.: 76001772
- Added to NRHP: December 12, 1976

St. Cecilia Academy is a historic religious building in Nashville, Tennessee, U.S..

== History ==
The building was built on a mansion designed in the Greek Revival architectural style for John F. Erwin and his wife Lavinia Robertson Erwin. By 1903, three more houses were joined together to become home to the first Roman Catholic school in the state of Tennessee. It is now home to the convent for the Dominican Sisters of Saint Cecilia.

The building has been listed on the National Register of Historic Places since December 12, 1976.
