= Pod's and Jerry's =

Bygone Harlem jazz club

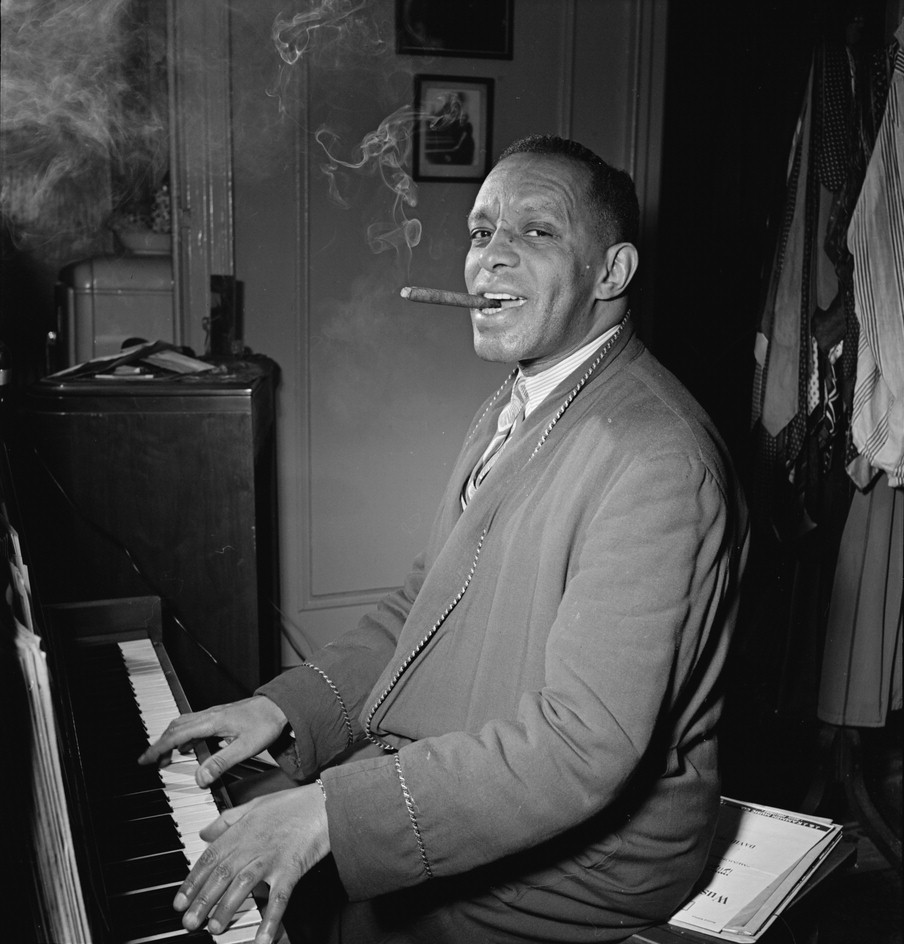
Willie "The Lion" Smith was house pianist during the Prohibition era.

Pod's and Jerry's, officially the Catagonia Club, was a cabaret and jazz club on 133rd Street in Harlem, New York City. It was one of the thriving speakeasies during the Prohibition era when the street was known as "Swing Street". It was established in 1925 by Charles "Pod" Hollingsworth and Jeremiah (Jerry) Preston. After the end of Prohibition in 1933 the club was renamed The Log Cabin, which was one of the last clubs to close on 133rd street in 1948, long after its demise.

== Description ==
The club has been described as "perhaps the city's most egalitarian entertainment spot prior to the Village's Cafe Society which opened in 1938", an "after-after-hours joint" which was a "racially integrated cellar speakeasy, jumpin' with music, singing and dancing". It typically opened at midnight and was still full at 3-4 am, and it was not uncommon for patrons to be served breakfast at the club as late as 8am. The club, a "dimly lit enclave of twenty-five tables with red and white checkered table cloths", was known for its wine and gin, and also served red beans and rice, chicken dishes, and a club specialty, "pig's feet". The peculiar mixed aroma of cooking meat and marijuana smoke characterized the place. All guests which ranged from African-American drug dealers to elite white Hollywood actresses were treated as equals. The owners Pod and Jerry had strong feelings against racists who objected to sitting with blacks, and if anybody caused a fracas, Pod would escort them out of the club to an all-white club.

== Notable people ==
The club featured jazz pianist and composer Willie "The Lion" Smith as a house pianist for some time, and he met his future wife, "Silvertop" Jennie, at the club. Billie Holiday cites the club as her first gig as a singer in 1933. Jazz musicians such as Artie Shaw, Benny Goodman, Sonny Greer, Charlie Barnet and The Dorsey Brothers all performed at Pod's and Jerry's, and actresses Mae West, Tallulah Bankhead and Joan Crawford and boxers Jack Dempsey and Gene Tunney regularly attended.
