= Bryant Hall Building =

Coordinates: 40°45′16.5″N 73°59′5″W

Bryant Hall Building was a Manhattan edifice erected in 1820 at 725–727 Sixth Avenue, between 41st Street and 42nd Street. House numbers on that avenue were later revised; the current building on the lot is 1095 Avenue of the Americas. Known as Trainors' Hall at first, it was also called Lyric Hall. A well-known landmark of midtown Manhattan, the building was enlarged in 1840 and renamed Lyric Hall. From 1914 - 1934 its ground floor was occupied by a Horn & Hardart restaurant. It was remodeled under the supervision of Philadelphia, Pennsylvania architect Ralph B. Bencker.

== History ==
Laura Cuppa Smith, a California resident, spoke on the subject of "Modern Religion: What Is Its Value?" at Bryant Hall Building on February 11, 1872.

The edifice was noted for holding wedding receptions and balls. Tompson and Peet were among the early lessees, followed by Terhune and Robas. Bryant Hall Building was badly burned in July 1888, when a fire began in John Simpson's dry goods store on the ground level.

Lyric Hall was host to a "testimonial," on October 5, 1892, by Ida B. Wells who spoke on lynching in the Southern states. Ms. Wells was a regular columnist for the New York Age, one of the most prominent African-American newspapers of the day. In her autobiography, Crusade for Justice, she described the occasion as "the greatest demonstration ever attempted by race women for one of their numbers."

Late in the 19th century the area became associated with crime and vice and was called the Tenderloin, Manhattan.

A ten-round boxing match between Joe Jeanette and Sam McVey was sponsored by the National Sporting Club of America on April 15, 1907. McVey was the first opponent James J. Jeffries faced in his career.

Grace Leroy, 19, was shot and killed during a Fashion Ball at Bryant Hall Building on January 3, 1910. She was the accidental victim of a gang feud in which revolver shots were fired in the café which adjoined the dance hall.

== Remodeling ==
The antiquated condition of Bryant Hall Building led to its remodeling and conversion into a single story structure in 1934. The upper floors, except for its walls and roof, were removed. Columns were then raised on the ground floor to support a new roof. Upon the columns the steel work for the roof and sign supports was installed. Steel girders and beams were run through the old walls, which were two feet thick in some places. Finally a terra cotta front was installed. The single story structure then measured twenty feet in height. The restaurant was kept open while the remodeling progressed.
