= Millboro, Virginia =

Unincorporated community in Virginia, US

Coordinates: 37°58′30″N 79°36′10″W

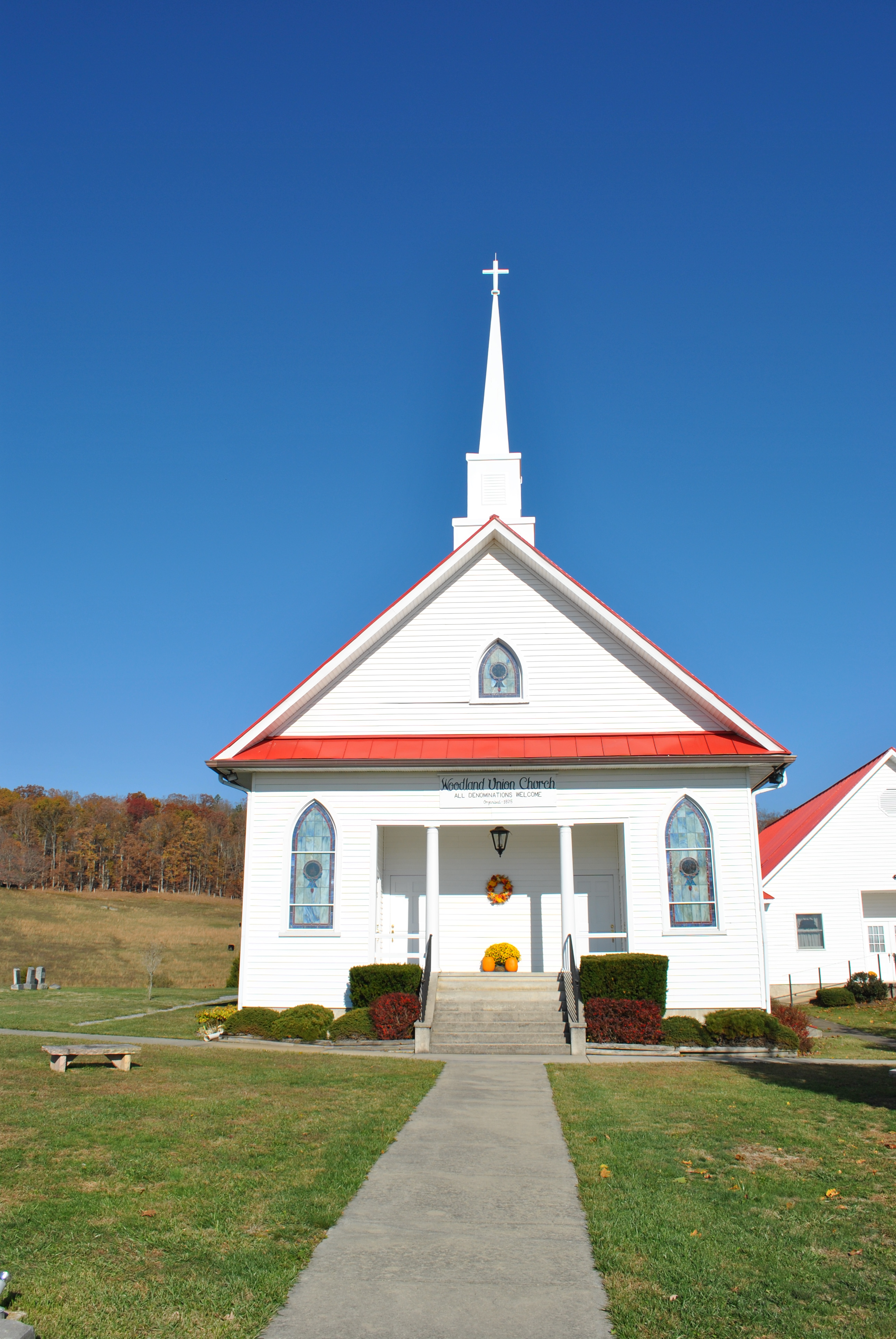
Woodland Union Church in Millboro

Millboro is an unincorporated community and census designated place in Bath County, Virginia, in the United States. As of the 2020 census, Millboro had a population of 236.

Douthat State Park Historic District and Millboro School are listed on the National Register of Historic Places.

== Demographics ==
Millboro first appeared as a census designated place in the 2020 United States census.
