= Lottie Gee =

American actress (1886–1973)

Lottie Gee (née Charlotte O. Gee; 17 August 1886 in Millboro, Virginia – 13 January 1973 in Los Angeles) was an American entertainer who performed in shows and musicals during the Harlem Renaissance. She is perhaps best known as a performer in the 1921 Broadway hit, Shuffle Along, the show that launched the careers of Josephine Baker and Florence Mills.

== Biography ==
Lottie Gee was born in Millboro, Virginia, United States. Initially a dancer in Aida Overton Walker's shows, she appeared in The Red Moon by Aida Overton Walker in 1904 and later toured the vaudeville circuit in multiple acts.

In 1910, composer Ford Dabney (1883–1958) formed several touring vaudeville groups, among which, he and violinist Willie Carroll (né William Thomas Carroll; 1881–1943) conceived and produced Dabney's Ginger Girls, a duet composed of Gee, as dancer and soprano, and Effie King, as dancer and contralto. The partnership first performed at Dabney's Theater in Washington, D.C., before touring. Effie King was the stage name of Anna Green (maiden; 1888–1944), who in 1907, married actor Frank Henry Wilson (1885–1956).

Gee sang the song "I'm Just Wild About Harry" in the musical Shuffle Along in 1921. Gee appeared in The Chocolate Dandies (1924). In 1925, she was a featured performer with Chocolate Kiddies on its European tour.

Gee and Edith Spencer became partners as Harlem’s Sweethearts in 1928. Later, Allegretti Anderson (1898–1944) (Note: Allegretta Anderson (née Alegretta Summers; 1898–1944) was a Chicago-born actress who – on May 29, 1916, in Chicago – married Julian Kirby Anderson (1895–1954). She later was married to Agaton H. Magboo. She acted in the 1930 film, Georgia Rose.) joined the group and they became a trio billed as Harmony Trio, the Creole Beauties, and the Three Dark Sisters. In 1927, Gee was an honorary pallbearer in the funeral of Florence Mills.

Gee was a longtime girlfriend of the composer Eubie Blake (1887–1983).

Gee was grandaunt to Grammy, Tony-award winner Dee Dee Bridgewater.

== Marriages ==
Lottie Gee married at least twice:

- From 1913 to 1924, she was married to pianist "Peaches" Kyer (né Wilson Harrison Kyer; 1888–1982).
- On October 7, 1967, in Los Angeles, she married Joseph B. Moy (1887–1986)

== Posthumous ==
Audra McDonald portrayed Lottie Gee in Shuffle Along, Or, the Making of the Musical Sensation of 1921 and All That Followed in 2016.
