= Arthur S. Lyons =

Actors talent agent (1895–1963)

Arthur Seymour Lyons (né Efroimsky; 27 May 1895 Minsk, Russia – 26 July 1963 Hollywood) was a theatrical agent for stage, radio, and film. He was also a one-time film producer.

== Career ==
Lyons was well-known for having been Jack Benny's manager. His brother, Samuel Theodore Lyons (né Schleima Efroimsky; 1899–1941), also born in Minsk, helped catapult Jack Benny into big-time show business beginning 1929. Arthur Lyons produced the 1948 film, Ruthless. Until his brother's death, Arthur and Sam were business partners. As producers, they were Lyons & Lyons. As agents, they were, in the 1930s, Lyons, McCormick and Lyons, then A & S Lyons Agency, Inc. Arthur was agent representative for Eugene O'Neill, Cole Porter, Jerome Kern, Joan Crawford, Ida Lupino, Lucille Ball, Hedy Lamarr, Carole Lombard, Kitty Carlisle, and Ray Milland.

Lyons is credited as book writer and staging of the Chocolate Kiddies 1925 European tour.

== Family ==
Lyons was married three times. His second, from 1938 to 1940, was to B movie actress Irene Rhodes, pseudonym of Ila Rae Curnutt (maiden; 1918–1982). Ila, sometime around 1940, presumably after her divorce from Lyons, became engaged to Ronald Reagan, which, according to her, lasted 8 or 9 months.

His third marriage – on November 16, 1961, in Los Angeles, to Winnifred L. Gilbert (née Winnifred L. Murphy; 1909–1991) – his surname on the marriage license was the maiden name of his mother, "Klionsky."
