= Afterhours club =

Nightclub open past curfew closing time

An afterhours club (aka after hours club and afterhour club) is a nightclub that is open past the designated curfew closing time for clubs that serve alcohol (which is often an hour long). Such clubs may cease serving alcohol at the designated time, but have special permission to remain open to customers and to sell non-alcoholic sodas and often highly caffeinated drinks.

In Western Europe—specifically in Germany, Spain, and the United Kingdom—24-hour "music and dance" licences, which do not necessarily have alcohol restrictions, are granted. These licences are granted in Victoria, Australia, too; an example being the Revolver Upstairs club.

In North America, afterhours clubs are typically small venues for professional musicians and entertainers to perform after their main gigs and patrons seeking entertainment after their evening's main event.

== Evolution of the term ==
While historically associated with nightclubs and venues that remain open after traditional closing hours, the term "Afterhours" has evolved to encompass broader meanings. In modern contexts, it is used in professional, creative, and commercial settings to describe activities, services, or events that operate outside conventional hours. This expanded use highlights flexibility, innovation, and productivity, making the term relevant to contemporary lifestyles and practices.

== Selected after hours clubs ==
Europe

- Canteret, Cullera Valencia 1981
- Chocolate, Valencia 1983
- Spook Factory, Valencia 1984
- Amnesia, Ibiza 1985
- Ku, Ibiza 1986
- Puzzle, Valencia 1987
- ACTV, Valencia 1988
- KGB, Barcelona 1988
- Attica, Madrid 1988
- Space, Ibiza 1989
- NOD, Riba-roja_de_Túria Valencia 1989
- Psicodromo, Barcelona 1989
- Babalu Club, Munich 1990, first afterhours club in Germany
- Trade, London 1990
- Rush, London 2001

North America

- Stereo, Montreal

Historic North America

- Macomba Lounge, Chicago
- Catacombs, Philadelphia
- Save the Robots, New York
- Nest Club (1923–1933), Harlem

== See also ==
- Techno
