= Book writer =

The book writer is the member of a musical's team who creates the book – the musical's plot, character development, and dramatic structure. Essentially, the book writer is the playwright of the musical, working very closely in collaboration with the lyricist and composer to create an integrated piece of drama.

== Role ==
Unlike the playwright of a traditional stage play, the book writer of a musical has to leave ample room for musical numbers to be sung and danced. This may mean that characters are not developed in as much detail as they would be in a play, and dialogue is often kept simple and concise.

The book writer may also be the musical's lyricist, composer, or director.
