= Richard Fall =

Austrian composer

Richard Fall (3 April 1882 – January 1945) was an Austrian composer and conductor of Jewish descent. One of his most famous compositions is the popular Was machst du mit dem Knie lieber Hans.

== Life ==
Born in Jevíčko, Österreich-Ungarn, Fall grew up in a family of musicians. His two brothers Leo and Siegfried as well as his father were also composers and conductors. Fall worked as operettas conductor in Berlin and Vienna and as film composer in Hollywood.

After the Anschluss (1938), he fled National Socialism to France.

On 20 November 1943 he was deported from the Drancy internment camp to the KZ Auschwitz-Birkenau, where he died early in January 1945, before the liberation of the concentration camp.

== Works ==
=== Stage plays ===
- Goldreifchen. Fairy tale in 3 acts. Libretto: Paul Wertheimer and Mia Ewers. UA 1909 Vienna
- Das Damenparadies. Operetta in one act. Libretto: Julius Brammer and Alfred Grünwald. UA 1911 Vienna
- Wiener Fratz. Operetta in one act. Libretto: Ernst Klein and Michail Alexandrowitsch Weikone. UA 1912 Vienna
- Arms and the Girl. Operetta in 2 scenes, Libretto: Austen Hurgon. UA 1912 London
- Leute vom Stand. Operetta in one act. Libretto: Robert Bodanzky and Fritz Grünbaum. UA 1913 Vienna
- Der Weltenbummler. Operetta in one prelude and 2 acts. Libretto: Fritz Löhner-Beda and Karl Lindau. UA 1915 Berlin
- Die Dame von Welt. Operetta in 3 acts. Libretto: Fritz Löhner-Beda and Hans Kottow. UA 1917 Vienna
- Die Puppenbaronessen. Musical comedy in 2 acts. Libretto: Alexander Engel and Fritz Grünbaum. UA 1917 Vienna
- Großstadtmärchen. Operetta in 3 acts. Libretto: Bruno Hardt-Warden and Erwin Weill. UA 1920 Vienna
- Im Alpenhotel. Operetta in one act. Libretto: Julius Horst and Ernst Wengraf. UA 1921 Vienna
- Der geizige Verschwender. Operetta in 3 acts. Libretto: Richard Kessler and Arthur Rebner. UA 1922 Berlin
- Apollo? Nur Apollo! Revue in 18 scenes (together with other composers). Libretto: Fritz Grünbaum, Wilhelm Sterk and Fritz Löhner-Beda. UA 1925 Vienna
- Hallo! Hier Grünbaum! Revue. Text: Fritz Grünbaum. UA 1927 Vienna

=== Songs ===
- Junger Mann, text: Arthur Rebner. 1923. Verlag Gabor Steiner, N.Y.
- Liebe Katharina, komm zu mir nach China! Lied and Foxtrot. Text: Fritz Löhner-Beda. 1927. Wiener Bohême Verlag
- Meine Tante, deine Tante. One-step, text: Fritz Löhner-Beda. 1925. Wiener Bohême Verlag
- Was machst du mit dem Knie, lieber Hans. Pasodoble, text: Fritz Löhner-Beda. 1925. Wiener Bohême Verlag
- Wenn man’s noch nie gemacht. Foxtrot, text: Arthur Rebner. 1923. Verlag Gabor Steiner, N.Y.
- Wo sind deine Haare, August? Foxtrot, text: Fritz Löhner-Beda

== Bibliography ==
- Kay Weniger: Zwischen Bühne und Baracke. Lexikon der verfolgten Theater-, Film- und Musikkünstler 1933 bis 1945. With an introduction by Paul Spiegel. Metropol, Berlin 2008, ISBN 978-3-938690-10-9, p. 387.
