= Shanghai Shuffle =

Song by Fletcher Henderson and his orchestra
- Recorded: October 10, 1924
- Genre: Dixieland jazz
- Label: Pathé, Vocalion
- Composer(s): Larry Conley; Gene Rodemich

"Shanghai Shuffle" is a jazz standard composed by Larry Conley and Gene Rodemich and recorded in 1924 by Fletcher Henderson featuring Louis Armstrong. It is in the key of F major and is evidently influenced by "Limehouse Blues". The signature clarinet sound has an eastern quality to it; Jeffrey Magee calls it an attempt to "reinforce the exotic jazz-Chinese connection".
