= SS Arabic (1920) =

Transatlantic ocean liner

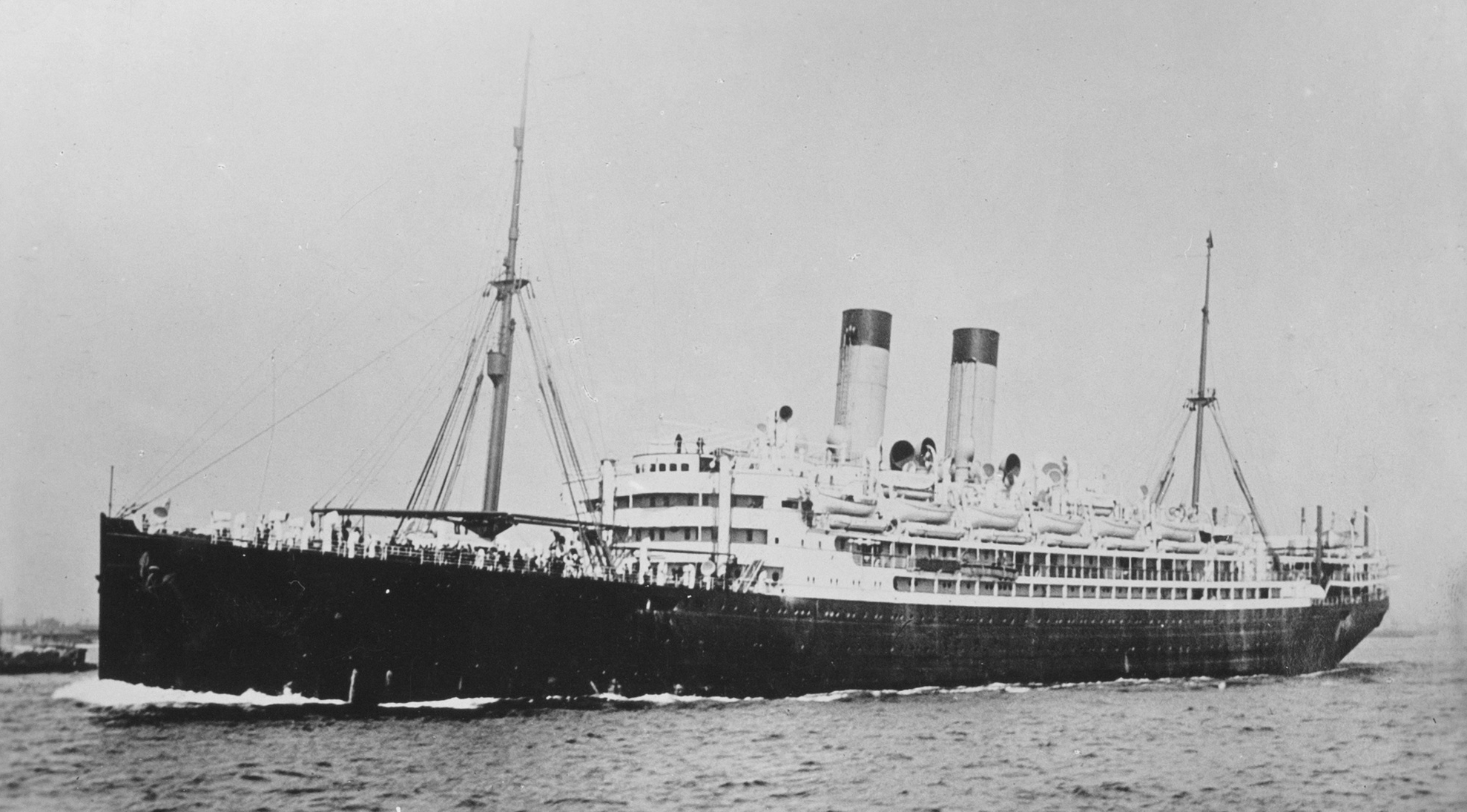
- Arabic at sea

History

German Empire
- Name: Berlin
- Operator: Norddeutscher Lloyd
- Builder: AG Weser, Bremen
- Launched: 7 November 1908
- Completed: 25 April 1909
- Commissioned: October 1914
- Fate: Interned 18 November 1914

United Kingdom
- Name: Arabic
- Operator: White Star Line; Red Star Line
- Acquired: by purchase, November 1920
- In service: 7 September 1921
- Fate: Sold for scrap, December 1931

General characteristics
- Type: ocean liner
- Tonnage: 17,324 GRT, 9,834 NRT
- Displacement: 23,700 t
- Length: 613 ft (187 m)
- Beam: 69.7 ft (21.2 m)
- Depth: 38.5 ft (11.7 m)
- Decks: 4
- Installed power: 2 × Quadruple expansion steam engines, 16,000 ihp (11,931 kW), 1,950 NHP
- Propulsion: 2 × screws
- Speed: 19 knots (35 km/h)
- Capacity: 3,212 passengers: 266 × 1st class; 246 × 2nd class; 2,700 × 3rd class
- Crew: 410

SS Arabic, built as Berlin, was an ocean liner launched on 7 November 1908 by the AG Weser shipyard in Germany. She made her maiden voyage on 1 May 1909 from Bremerhaven to New York and Genoa. In September 1914 she became an auxiliary cruiser of the Imperial German Navy as a minelayer.

Berlin remained in Norway for the remainder of the war. In 1919 she was transferred to Britain as war reparations and became White Star Line's Arabic. In 1931 she was discarded and broken up for scrap.

== History ==
=== Early career ===
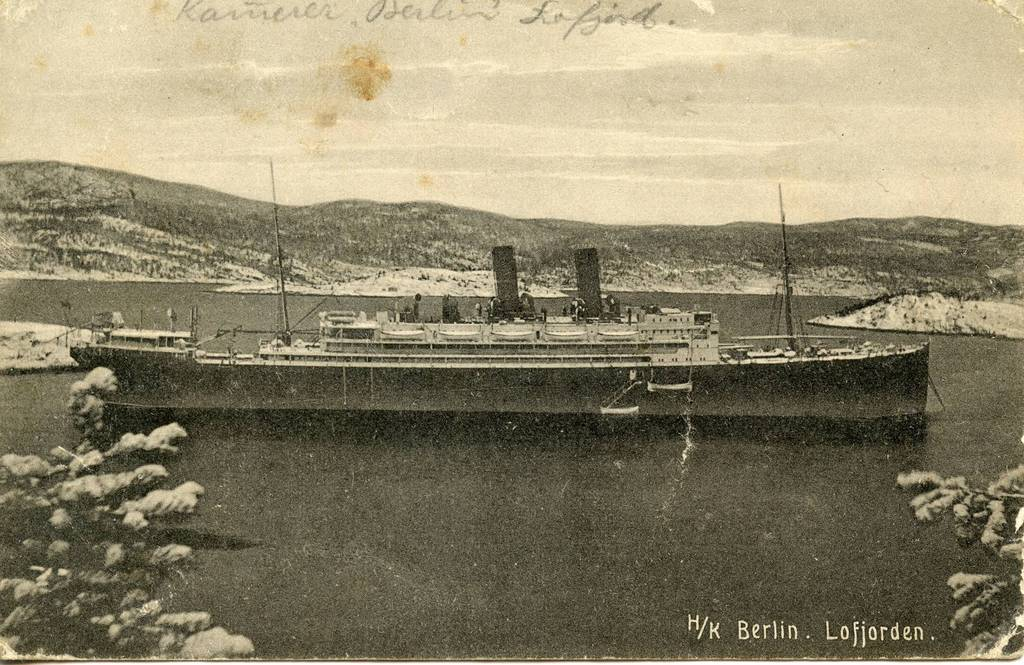
Berlin interned at Lofjord, in Trondheim, Norway

Berlin was built in 1908 by AG Weser of Bremen for the North German Lloyd shipping line, and saw service on the Genoa to New York City route prior to the outbreak of the First World War. In August 1914 Berlin was at Bremerhaven undergoing repairs, and was taken over by the Imperial German Navy for service as an auxiliary cruiser.

=== World War I ===
Berlin was intended for use as a fast minelayer, and also to be a commerce raider. This was part of Germany's kleinkrieg campaign, to wear down Britain's numerical advantage by using mines and other devices to sink warships, or to divert them from fleet operations into trade protection. Berlin was converted for the role at Kaiserliche Werft (KWW) in Wilhelmshaven, and equipped with minelaying equipment and 200 mines. She also carried two 105 mm guns, and several heavy machine guns.

Commissioned in October 1914 under the command of KzS Hans Pfundheller, the ship's first mission was laying a mine field off the northwest coast of Ireland against British trade. This she succeeded in doing, laying 200 mines on 23 October off Tory Island. The first victim of Berlin's minefield was the British cargo ship Manchester Commerce of 5,363 GRT. By chance the Grand Fleet had evacuated Scapa Flow under the threat of U-boat attacks (the Flow being undefended at that time) and were stationed temporarily at Lough Swilly. On 27 October vessels of the Grand Fleet sailed into Berlin’s minefield; the new dreadnought battleship HMS Audacious was struck and damaged, sinking later as efforts were made to tow her to safety. The transatlantic liner RMS Olympic was also in the area, with a full complement of passengers, but she did not hit any of Berlin’s mines, and thus avoided a major diplomatic incident.

Berlin sought to return to Germany, but put in at Trondheim with storm damage. Having outstayed her 24 hours' grace and unfit to leave port, she was interned by the Norwegians on 18 November 1914.

=== Post-war career ===
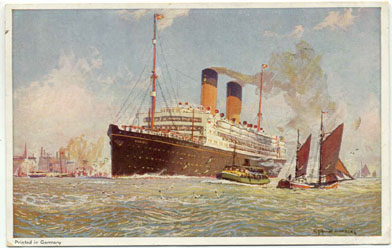
Postcard of Arabic

In December 1919 she was a war reparation to P&O. About a year later in 1920 she was bought by White Star Line, based in Liverpool and was refitted in Portsmouth, it was then she was renamed Arabic. In September 1921 she made her first voyage as a White Star Line ship, between Southampton and New York. Afterwards, she sailed on the Mediterranean to New York service until 1924, when she was moved to the Hamburg to New York route. Later that year her passenger accommodation was modified, and on 29 October 1926 she made her first voyage under charter to the Red Star Line. She remained with Red Star until 1930, when she reverted to the White Star and her passenger accommodation was again modified. Less than one year later she was sold for breaking up at Genoa.

== Bibliography ==
- Halpern, Paul G. (1994). A Naval History of World War I. London: UCL Press. ISBN 1-85728-295-7. OCLC 31160583.
- Hawkins, Nigel (2002). The Starvation Blockades: Naval Blockades of WW1. Barnsley: Leo Cooper. ISBN 978-0-85052-908-1. OCLC 1154858280.
- Schmalenbach, Paul (1979). German Raiders: A History of Auxiliary Cruisers of the German Navy, 1895-1945. Cambridge [England]: Patrick Stephens. ISBN 0-85059-351-4. OCLC 7843588.
