= Garvin Bushell =

American musician (1902–1991)

- Garvin Bushell (standing, third from right) with Sam Wooding and his Orchestra, 1925

Background information
- Born: Garvin Lamont Payne; September 25, 1902; Springfield, Ohio, U.S.
- Died: October 31, 1991 (aged 89) Las Vegas, Nevada
- Genres: Jazz, classical
- Occupations: Musician, educator
- Instrument: Woodwind instruments

Garvin Bushell (né Garvin Lamont Payne; September 25, 1902 – October 31, 1991) was an American clarinetist, saxophonist, and bassoonist. He performed with many prominent 20th-century jazz musicians, including Jelly Roll Morton and John Coltrane.

== Early life ==
Bushell was born in Springfield, Ohio, to Alexander Payne, Jr. (1875–1908) and Effie Penn (maiden; 1879–1968). After his father's death, his mother – on January 12, 1910, in Covington, Kentucky – married Rev. Joseph Davenport Bushell (1878–1960). Garvin adopted the surname of his stepfather.

== Career ==
Bushell played both jazz and classical music on clarinet, alto clarinet, oboe, english horn, flute, saxophone, bassoon, and contrabassoon.

He was best known as a jazz sideman with people such as Perry Bradford, and performed and/or recorded with many of jazz's great names, such as Fletcher Henderson, Bunk Johnson, Fats Waller, Cab Calloway, Eric Dolphy, Gil Evans, and John Coltrane. Bushell never recorded as a session leader.

Bushell eventually settled in Las Vegas, Nevada, where he worked as a music teacher.

== Personal life ==
Bushell – on July 24, 1923, in Manhattan – married Marie Roberts (maiden; 1902–1971), who, among other things, had been a member of the Chocolate Kiddies chorus for the 1925 European tour. Garvin was a member of the band for that tour.

Bushell – in 1965 in Manhattan – married Louise Olivari (maiden; 1925–1994), to whom he remained married until his death in 1991. Garvin and Louise had two sons, Garvin P. Bushell and Philip Bushell.

== Discography ==
- John Coltrane, Africa/Brass (Impulse!, 1961)
- John Coltrane, The Other Village Vanguard Tapes ABC (Impulse!, 1977)
- Doc Cook/Johnny Dunn, Doc Cook and His Dreamland Orchestra and 14 Doctors of Syncopation/Johnny Dunn and His Band with Jelly Roll Morton (VJM, 1970)
- Wilbur de Paris, The Wild Jazz Age (Atlantic, 1960)
- Wilbur de Paris, On the Riviera (Atlantic, 1962)
- Gil Evans, The Individualism of Gil Evans (Verve, 1964)
- Ella Fitzgerald/Chick Webb, Ella Fitzgerald & the Chick Webb Orchestra (Joker, 1974)
- Fletcher Henderson All Stars, The Big Reunion (Jazztone, 1958)
- Barbara Lea, Lea in Love (Prestige, 1956)
- Kid Ory/Bunk Johnson, New Orleans Legends (CBS, 1975)
- Rex Stewart, Rendezvous with Rex (Felsted, 1959)
- Rex Stewart, Henderson Homecoming (United Artists, 1959)
- Ethel Waters, Ethel Waters 1938–1939 (RCA Victor, 1972)
- Chick Webb Orchestra/Ella Fitzgerald, Live Session at the Savoy Ballroom Harlem December 1939 (Musidisc, 1975)
- Edith Wilson, Edith Wilson/1921-22 (Fountain, 1974)
- Sam Wooding, Sam Wooding & His Chocolate Dandies (Biograph, 1970)
