= Gene Sedric =

American jazz clarinetist and tenor saxophonist (1907–1963)

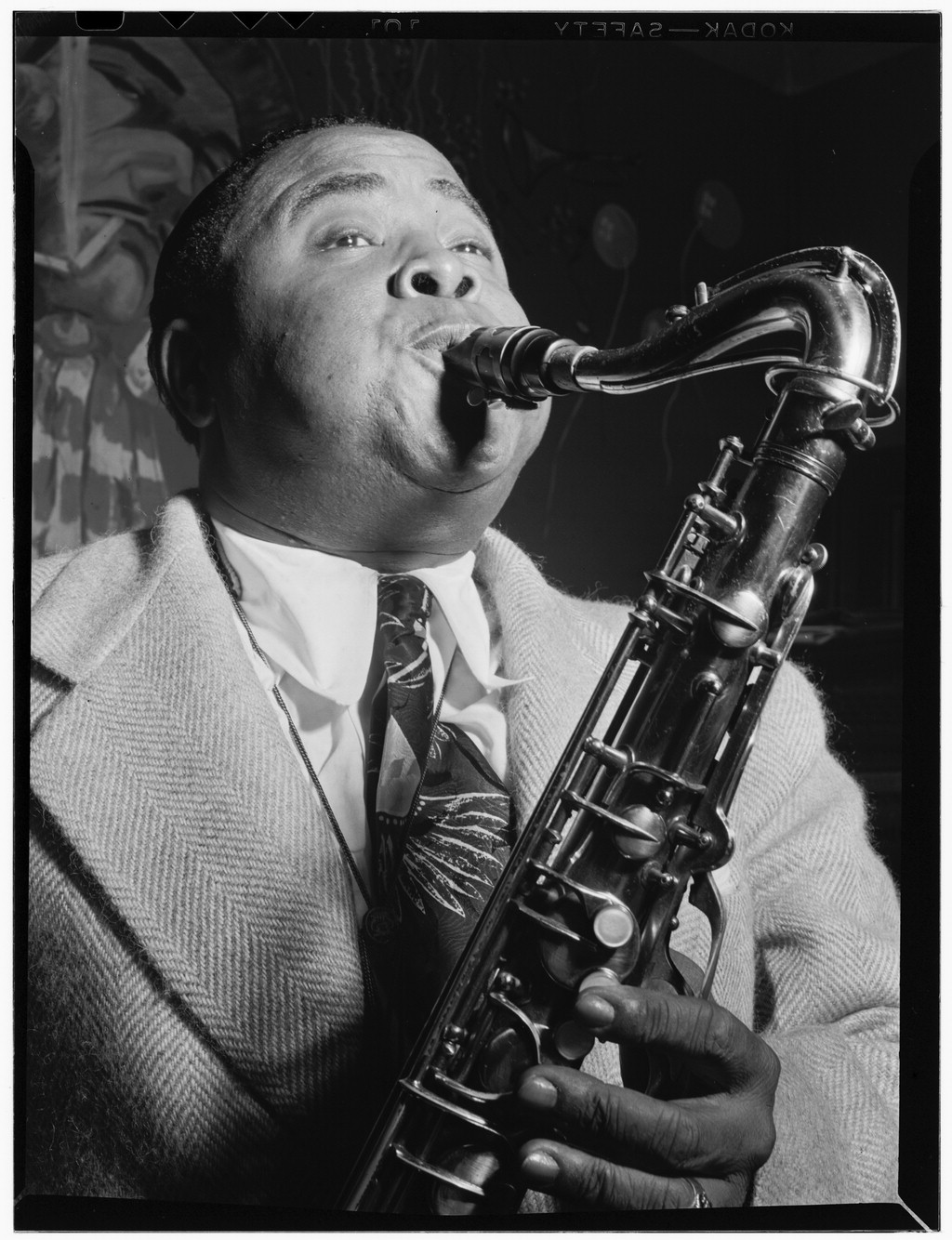

Background information
- Birth name: Eugene Hall Sedric
- Also known as: "Honey Bear"
- Born: June 17, 1907; St. Louis, Missouri
- Died: April 3, 1963 (aged 55); New York City
- Genres: Jazz
- Occupation: Musicians
- Instrument(s): Saxophone, clarinet

Eugene Hall Cedric June 17, 1907, St. Louis, Missouri – April 3, 1963, New York City) was an American jazz clarinetist and tenor saxophonist. He acquired the nickname "Honey Bear" in the 1930s because of his large camelhair coat.

== Life ==
Sedric's father played ragtime piano. Sedric played with Charlie Creath in his hometown and then with Fate Marable, Dewey Jackson, Ed Allen, and Julian Arthur. He joined Sam Wooding's Orchestra in 1925, and toured Europe with him until 1931, when the unit dissolved. He returned to New York City and played with Fletcher Henderson and Alex Hill, then joined Fats Waller's Rhythm in 1934, remaining in Waller's employ until 1942.

When Waller went on solo tours Sedric found work gigging alongside Mezz Mezzrow (1937) and Don Redman (1938-39). Sedric put together his own group in 1943, then played with Phil Moore in 1944 and Hazel Scott in 1945. He put together another ensemble from 1946 to 1951, playing in New York. Later associations include time with Pat Flowers (1946–47), Bobby Hackett (1951), Jimmy McPartland, Mezzrow again (1953), Conrad Janis (1953), and Dick Wellstood (1961). Sedric recorded sparingly as a leader, in 1938, 1946, and with Mezzrow in 1953.

American filmmaker Woody Allen describes taking lessons from Sedric as a young man, "But the clarinet I mostly played by myself. I called up a jazz musician—quite a well known jazz musician named Gene Sedric, and asked him if he could give me some lessons. And he used to come to my house and he would just sit in the living room with me and play something and say: 'You do it now'. And, and gradually I learned how to ah, how to play."
