= Bobby Martin (musician) =

American jazz trumpeter

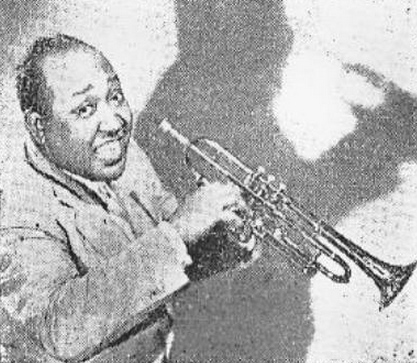
- Bobby Martin c. 1943

Background information
- Born: May 15, 1903; United States
- Died: March 1983 (aged 79)
- Genres: Jazz
- Occupations: Musician, club owner
- Instrument: Trumpet
- Formerly of: June Clark; Sonny Greer; Sam Wooding; Willie Lewis

Bobby Martin (May 15, 1903 – March 1983) was an American jazz trumpeter.

== Biography ==
Martin played trumpet as a child with June Clark and Sonny Greer. He played with Sam Wooding from 1925, and played with him both in New York City and on his tours of Europe through 1931.

From 1932 to 1936 Martin played abroad with Willie Lewis, and formed his own band after returning home in 1937. His quartet held an extended gig at the Palace in Greenwich Village; the other players were pianist Richard Edwards, drummer Ural Dean, and guitarist Samuel Steede. This era of Martin's life is poorly documented, however, because during a tour of The Netherlands at the Mephisto Club in Rotterdam, his entire book of arrangements was burned in a club fire.

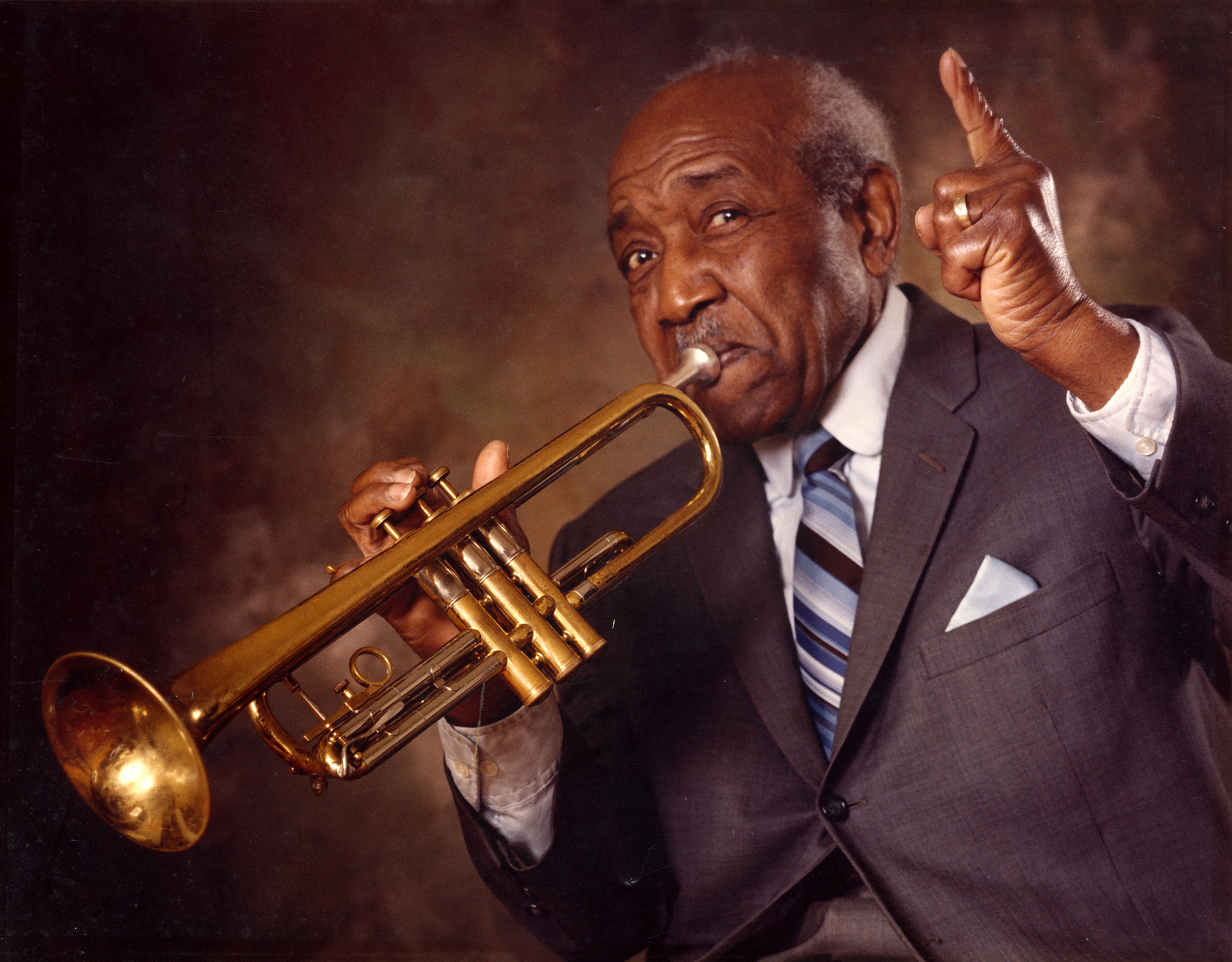
Martin, circa 1980.

Martin continued to tour Europe into the 1940s, then held residencies in New York City and New Jersey. He opened his own club briefly in the 1940s as well. He was married to Thelma Minor, a vocalist. He left the music industry in 1944.
