= Sam Wooding =

American jazz pianist (1895–1985)

- Born: Samuel David Wooding; 17 June 1895; Philadelphia, Pennsylvania, United States
- Died: 1 August 1985 (aged 90) Manhattan, New York, United States
- Genre: Jazz
- Occupations: Pianist, arranger, bandleader

Samuel David Wooding (17 June 1895 – 1 August 1985) was an American jazz pianist, arranger and bandleader living and performing in Europe and the United States.

== Career ==
Born in Philadelphia, Pennsylvania, United States, between 1921 and 1923 Wooding was a member of Johnny Dunn's Original Jazz Hounds, one of several Dunn-led line-ups that recorded in New York around that time for the Columbia label.

Wooding led several big bands in the United States and abroad.

=== 1925 European tour ===
Wooding and his band had developed a floor show for the 1923 opening of the Nest Club, and in 1925, while performing at Smalls Paradise, a Russian-American impresario booked Wooding and his band – as "the Chocolate Kiddies" – as well as his revue performers for a European tour, performing in Berlin, Hamburg, Stockholm, and Copenhagen. The cast of Chocolate Kiddies included singer Adelaide Hall, The Three Eddies, singer Lottie Gee, Rufus Greenlee and Thaddeus Drayton, Bobbie and Babe Goins, and Charles Davis.

While in Berlin, the band, recorded several selections for the Berlin-based Vox label.

Sam Wooding and His Orchestra
akaThe Chocolate Kiddies

1925 photo taken at the Vox Phonograph Studio — Sam Wooding and his Orchestra; Seated, left to right: Tommy Ladnier (trumpet), John Warren (tuba) (behind), Sam Wooding (piano/leader), Willie Lewis (reeds), George Howe (1892–1936) (drums). Standing, left to right: Herb Flemming (trombone), Eugene Sedric (reeds), Johnny Mitchell (banjo), Bobby Martin (trumpet), Garvin Bushell (reeds), Maceo Elmer Edwards (1900–1988) (trumpet).
Not pictured: Arthur Lange (1889–1956), Arthur Johnston (1898–1954), arrangers

=== 1927 Argentine tour ===
In the year 1927, just a few months before the Oito Batutas started their tour in southern Brazil in Florianópolis, and four years after the Brazilian musicians passed through Argentina, an orchestra that would be referred to as one of the first public contacts debuted in Buenos Aires Argentine with the so-called black jazz. Sam Wooding (Philadelphia, Pa, 6/17/1895 - 8/1/1985), pianist, arranger and bandleader, joins his orchestra, in 1925, to a magazine show called Chocolate Kiddies, with which he leaves, that year, on an excursion to Europe. There, the band separates from the troupe and continues to perform in several countries on the continent, before heading to South America in 1927. Wooding will return to Europe, touring intensively between 1928 and 1931. For Pujol (2004, p. 24 -27), Sam Wooding's was one of the first - and musically the best, because "de formación más compacta y de mejores solistas" - orchestras that made the Argentine public aware of a type of jazz after ragtime, more syncopated and very marked by improvisation. It would be Humberto Cairo himself, still in full activity as a businessman for Empire and Maipo, to bring Sam Wooding's orchestra to Argentina, apparently with a contract ended on a businessman's trip to Europe. The group will debut at the Empire on April 8, 1927, in a double session - at 6:30 pm – 11:00 pm - and, following the same initial script of the Eight Batutas in December 1922, they will also start playing at Maipo from the day 11, integrating a magazine called La Mejor Revista. The newspapers had been announcing for several days what would be the debut of, as announced in La Nación on April 3, "el jazz más formidable del mundo", or, still in the same newspaper, two days later, "el mejor jazz of black Americans ". The ads invariably highlighted the fact that it was a group of black, or colored, musicians.

=== 1929 European tour ===
In 1929, with slightly different personnel, Wooding's orchestra made more recordings in Barcelona and Paris for the Parlophone and Pathé labels.

=== Career (continued) ===
Wooding did return to America in 1934. On 14 February 1934, Wooding and his orchestra were featured at The Apollo theater in Harlem in a Clarence Robinson production titled Chocolate Soldiers, starring the Broadway star Adelaide Hall. The show ran for a limited engagement and was highly praised by the press and helped establish The Apollo as Harlem's premier theater. It was the first major production staged at the newly renovated theater.

Wooding returned to Europe, performing on the Continent, in Russia and England throughout most of the 1930s. Wooding's long stays overseas made him virtually unknown at home, but Europeans were among the staunchest jazz fans anywhere, and they loved what the band had to offer. "We found it hard to believe, but the Europeans treated us with as much respect as they did their own symphonic orchestras," he recalled in a 1978 interview. "They loved our music, but they didn’t quite understand it, so I made it a load easier for them by incorporating such melodies as "Du holder Abendstern" from Tannhäuser - syncopated, of course. They called it blasphemy, but they couldn't get enough of it. That would never have happened back here in the States. Here they looked on jazz as something that belonged in the gin mills and sporting houses, and if someone had suggested booking a blues singer like Bessie Smith, or even a white girl like Nora Bayes, on the same bill as Ernestine Schumann-Heink, it would have been regarded as a joke in the poorest of taste."

Returning home in the late 1930s, when World War II seemed a certainty, Wooding began formal studies of music, attained a degree, and began teaching full-time, counting among his students trumpeter Clifford Brown. From 1937 to 1941, Wooding led and toured with the Southland Spiritual Choir.

In the early 1970s, Sam Wooding formed another big band and took it to Switzerland for a successful concert, but this venture was short-lived.

=== Death ===
Wooding died August 1, 1985, in Manhattan at Saint Luke's Hospital.
