= Willie Lewis (jazz musician) =

American jazz musician (1905–1971)

William T. Lewis
- Born: 10 June 1905; Cleburne, Texas, United States
- Died: 13 January 1971 (aged 65); New York City, New York, United States
- Other names: Willie Lewis
- Occupation: Jazz Musician

William T. Lewis (né Willie Meria Tawlton Lewis; 10 June 1905 – 13 January 1971) was an American jazz clarinetist and bandleader.

== Career ==
Lewis was born Cleburne, Texas, United States. He grew up in Dallas and played in variety shows as a teenager. He attended the New England Conservatory of Music and then played in Will Marion Cook's orchestra. When Cook's band was taken over by Sam Wooding, Lewis traveled with him on tours of Europe, South America, and North Africa, remaining until Wooding disbanded the orchestra in 1931.

Following this, Lewis set up his own band called Willie Lewis and His Entertainers, which featured some of Wooding's former players and achieved great success in Europe. Among those who played under Lewis were: Herman Chittison, Benny Carter, Bill Coleman, Garnet Clark, Bobby Martin, and June Cole. Lewis's Entertainers recorded for French label Disques Swing.

In 1941, Lewis disbanded the Entertainers and returned to New York City. He performed infrequently after this; although he found some work as an actor, he took up bartending as his fortunes declined. He died in New York City at the age of 65.
