= List of New Orleans gangs =

Before Hurricane Katrina, New Orleans gangs tended to be small violent local groups divided among its 17 voting districts known as "wards". NOPD classified these groups as drug organizations or "cliques," with about 10-15 members. The most infamous criminal organizations formed in the city during the turbulent mid-1980s, with the Glenn Metz Gang, the Sam Clay Organization, Hardy Boys and the Richard Pena Organization being the most notorious. Other drug crews like the Balley Boys and the Hankton Organization were also active during the 1990s.

According to New Orleans Police Department, gang related homicides spiked in 2007, which drove the city's homicide rate to a record high. Some of the most violent cliques, like the Dooney Boys and the 9th ward G-Strip Gang, moved to other cities and clashed with each other in violent gun battles. New Orleans drug crews became involved in violent crime and murders and spread throughout the drug trade in host cities and states such as Atlanta, Houston, Tennessee, Dallas and Baton Rouge. In 2012, Mayor Mitch Landrieu formed the Multi-Agency Gang (MAG) Unit, which is the key enforcement component of the Group Violence Reduction Strategy (GVRS). The MAG Unit identifies the most dangerous and influential gang members and removes them from the community.

== Post-Katrina ==
- 39ers Gang, multi-state
- 110ers, Lower Garden District
- Byrd Gang, Central City
- Joesphine Dog Pound, Central City
- Dumaine Street Gang (also known as "D-Block"), Treme
- Ride or Die, St. Roch
- Taliban Gang, Pigeon Town (inactive)
- Big 8s, St Roch
- Glock Boyz
- Young Glock Slingers, also known as 150, Algiers
- Wild Side Gangstas, Treme
- Ghost Gang, Central City (inactive)
- Young Melf Mafia, Central City
- International Robbin Crew (IRC), multi-state (inactive)
- Hot Block, Algiers (inactive)
- FnD Gang, Seventh Ward (inactive)
- Deuce Gang Goonies, Iberville (inactive)
- Grave Diggers, Iberville
- Guap Boyz, Algiers
- PCB, Seventh Ward. (inactive)
- Mob Pirus
- Mid City Killers, Mid-City

== Pre-Katrina ==
- Dooney Boys, multi-state (inactive)
- Whitney Boys, Algiers (inactive)
- D-Block Boys, Algiers (inactive)
- 3-N-G, Central City (merged with G-Strip)
- G-Strip, Ninth Ward (merged with 3-N-G)
- Phillip and Clara Crew, Central City (inactive)
- Hot Boys, Central City.
- Dorgenois and Dumaine Crew (now known as D' Block)
- Fischer Fools, Algiers (now known as 150)
- Cuthroat Posse, Lower Garden District
- Florida Posse, Ninth Ward (inactive)
- 7th Ward Hardheads, Seventh Ward (inactive)St.Bernard Boys by way of Slidell la ( Lincoln Park)(inactive)
- Deslonde Boys, Ninth Ward (inactive)
- Porch Boys, Central City (inactive)
- Josephine and Danneel Crew, Central City
- Cutt Boys, Central City (inactive)
- Gotti Boys, Central City (inactive)
- Cutoff Posse, Algiers
- 11th Ward Hustlers, Irish Channel
- Gertown Hounds, Gertown
- Eagle Street Crew, Hollygrove
- Melph Mafia, Central City

- Park Place Pipers, Terrytown.
