= D-Block Boys =

- Founded: New Orleans
- Founding location: Algiers, New Orleans
- Years active: 2004–2017
- Ethnicity: Primarily African American
- Criminal activities: Drug trafficking, murder, theft
- Allies: Fischer Fools

The D-Block Boys, also known as DBG, was an American criminal street gang that operated in Algiers, New Orleans, Louisiana. The gang has been involved in criminal activity including drug trafficking and multiple murders. According to NOPD, The "D-Block Gang" has a history of violations, along with involvement in violent crimes. This gang is not to be confused with the Dumaine street drug ring operating out of the 6th Ward of New Orleans, which is also called D'Block.

== Overview ==
The gang formed in the Algiers neighborhood by teenagers who lived in the DeGaulle Manor Public Housing Complex, and the Fischer Projects. The name derived from the apartments which were nicknamed "D-Block." The D-Block clique have been tied to several homicides, most of which were between 2005 and 2007. NOPD's Fourth District police have been tracking the gang since the mid-2000s as they distributed heroin and cocaine out of abandoned units in the DeGaulle Manor apartments, the base of their operation. Investigators stated the D-Block gang had access to high-powered assault rifles, which they used in deadly conflicts with rival drug organizations. NOPD linked the gang to nine homicides in the Algiers area and five in Jefferson Parish from 2004 to 2006. In 2011 the Federal Bureau of Investigation listed the gang as a threat. In 2017, three members were arrested on Westpark Court in a raid for possession of a firearm while in possession of illegal narcotics, possession of a stolen firearm and possession with the intent to distribute heroin and marijuana, as well as a felon being in possession of a firearm. During the search, detectives confiscated multiple firearms, 31 individually wrapped clear bags of a white powder substance later determined to be heroin, 36 individually wrapped clear bags of marijuana, cash and other items.

== 2006 investigation ==
The events leading up to the investigation began in the summer of 2005. NOPD linked the gruesome slaying of two Avondale cousins to the D-Block gang. The decomposed bodies were discovered on May 8 in DeGaulle Manor, inside the trunk of a car. Both men were tied up with gunshot wounds to the head. Homicide detectives did not have enough physical evidence to charge them. In July, three members; Jamal Brooks, Hyran Brooks and Nicholas Wix were charged with first-degree murder for another double homicide, which took place on June 27. The slayings in June were that of a man and woman. According to authorities, the two were killed inside their home in the 1600 block of Murl Street after it was sprayed with more than 20 bullets; they were not the intended targets for the attack.

- March 2006, police arrested members Jerome Gray and Cornell Williams in DeGaulle Manor for allegedly shooting assault rifles in the courtyard. The weapons would be traced to the April 26 shooting in the 2300 block of Murl Street.
- April 2006, NOPD Fourth District linked Bryan Thomas as the fourth suspect to the June 27th double homicide.
- July 2006, NOPD arrested five D-Block members in the Fischer Projects. Anthony "Nut" Thomas who was suspected of the April 26 shooting, had an active warrant out. SWAT team raided the complex and found the group in the courtyard. One of them was in possession of an SKS rifle. All five men were arrested. Thomas, who had a pending warrant, was booked with two counts of illegally carrying a weapon, possession of an obliterated serial number, drug possession and resisting an officer.

== See also ==
- List of New Orleans gangs
