= 110ers =

American criminal organization

110ers Gang
- Founding location: 10th/11th Ward
- Years active: 2000's–present
- Territory: Garden District Irish Channel
- Ethnicity: Primarily African American
- Criminal activities: drug trafficking, murder, theft and kidnapping
- Rivals: Ride or Die Gang, Young Melph Mafia, 39ers gang

The "110ers Gang" is a criminal organization located in New Orleans, Louisiana. They are one of the most violent gangs operating out of the 11th and 10th Wards which is located in the Uptown area. Some of the original members grew up in the old St. Thomas Projects which was torn down in 1998. Multi-Agency Gang (MAG) Unit have been investigating the gang since 2010 and linked the gang to several drug-related murders in the Central city neighborhood. In recent years the gang have been known to feud with the Young Melph Mafia and the Ride or Die Gang from the 8th Ward of New Orleans. The bloodshed between the gangs lasted for years until the gang was under a federal investigation by the FBI.

== 2013 indictment ==
- In May 2013, 15 members of the 110ers gang was charged in a 51-count indictment which was the "most sweeping street gang indictment" in the city's history. Prosecutors say the gang members are responsible for at least 10 killings; including the death of a little girl at a birthday party in May 2012.
