= Behrman, New Orleans =

Coordinates: 29.935°N 90.027°W

Behrman also known as Central Algiers, is a largest community located in Algiers, New Orleans

== History ==
Freed slaves would inhabit the area primarily on Saux Lane, which was the home of historical jazz musicians Tom Albert and Eddie Vincent. The second portion known as "Behrman Heights", would be constructed during the mid-1960s and early 1970s with apartments, townhouses and duplexes that served as middle class housing. Behrman Stadium is located in between both sections. Beginning of the 1970s, Behrman Heights became more diverse with whites and blacks living together until public housing was built, which resulted in an influx of low-income black families. This led to the middle class families moving to New Auroa and Huntlee Village. By 1975, the community was 75% African American. In the 1980s, crime raised major concerns for residents, urging some to organize neighborhood watch groups. Crime still remains an ongoing problem, as well as vacant lots which were cleaned up in efforts to keep the community clean.

== Demographics ==
The neighborhood is predominantly African American, with 90.4% of residents identifying as such in the 2000 Census.

== Crime ==
The neighborhood has long suffered from a high crime rate due to gun violence and drugs. Starting in the mid-1980s with drugs such as cocaine, Pentazocine, heroin, and phencyclidine strongly affected the neighborhood, mostly around Elizardi and Murl Streets. In 1990, residents of Behrman Heights began to organize neighborhood watch groups stating that they are "fed up with crime" after frequent shootings, robberies, and auto thefts. The anti-crime block parties were meant to help reduce crime but had little effect. Throughout the 1990s and early 2000s, drug activity in the neighborhood had only worsened along with violent crime.

The overall crime rate in Behrman is 141% higher than the national average. For every 100,000 people, there are 19.52 daily crimes that occur in Behrman. Behrman is safer than 16% of the cities in the Louisiana. The number of total year over year crimes in New Orleans has increased by 12%. Berhman also ranks sixth in city annual gun violence.

== Housing ==
The median home price in Behrman is 38% lower than the national average. The median rent asked in Behrman is 1% higher than the national average. The average number of people per household is 13% higher than the national average. The number of owner-occupied households in Behrman is 25% lower than the national average. The number of renters occupied households in Behrman is 45% higher than the national average.

=== Public Housing ===
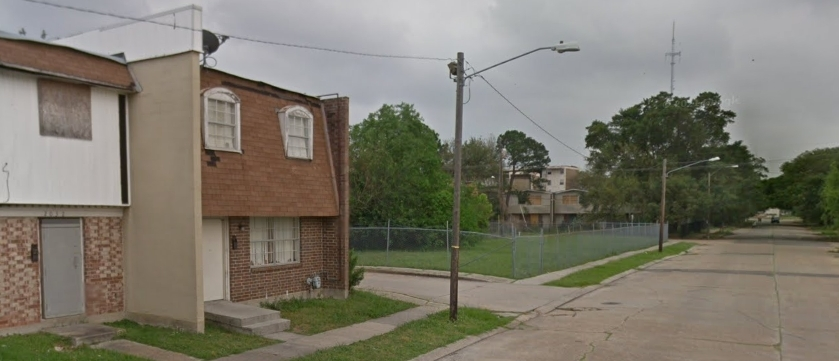
Christopher Homes and DeGaulle Manor complexes on Murl Street in 2008.

Public housing complexes in Behrman were filled mostly with low income residents who lived in DeGaulle Manor and the Christopher Park Homes. The two complexes were located along Murl Street and Vespasian Boulevard and mainly housed poor African American families. HANO and HUD began to shut down and demolish the complexes in the years following Hurricane Katrina, though some remain abandoned. These areas where also plagued with various problems including high-vacancy, drugs, and crime.

== Education ==
The community is zoned to New Orleans Public Schools (NOPS) and the Recovery School District (RSD) operates public schools and handles charter schools.
