= Thomas Albert =

Thomas Albert may refer to:

- Thomas Albert (composer) (born 1948), American composer and educator
- Thomas Albert (politician) (born 1985), member of the Michigan Senate
- Tom Albert (1877–1969), American jazz violinist, trumpeter and band leader

== See also ==
- Albert Tom (born 1956), member of the Arizona House of Representatives
