= Joe Blakk =

American rapper

- Born: Joseph Francois; September 1, 1970 (age 55)
- Origin: New Orleans, Louisiana, United States
- Genres: Hip hop
- Occupations: Rapper, activist
- Years active: 1993–2003
- Labels: Mercenary Records; Blakk Magic Entertainment

Joseph Francois (born September 1, 1970), better known by his stage name Joe Blakk, is an American rapper and activist from New Orleans. He gained success in the early 1990s after releasing his hit songs "It Ain't Where Ya From" and "Boot Up or Shut Up."

== Career ==
Joe Blakk was raised in the Christopher Homes Housing Development in the Algiers neighborhood of New Orleans. While in his senior year at Southern University, he released his debut album It Ain't Where Ya From on Mercenary Records. The album, produced by Ice Mike, sold 75,000 units, along with the title song, which became popular in New Orleans. He then released his second single, JB's Revenge, in 1994 to commercial success. In 1998, he released the single "Boot Up or Shut Up" which became his most successful song. It peaked at #41 on the Hot R&B/Hip-Hop Songs chart. The single would later be released on Joe Blakk's second album Blood, Sweat & Tears. As of 2009, Blakk ran an income tax preparation business in Louisiana.

== Discography ==
- 1993: It Ain't Where Ya From
- 1998: Blood, Sweat & Tears

== Singles ==
=== As lead artist ===
List of singles, with chart position, showing year released and album name
Title	Year	Peak chart position on US R&B	Album
"It Ain't Where Ya From"		—	Blood Sweat & Tears
"Boot Up or Shut Up" (featuring T.T. Tucker)		41	Blood Sweat & Tears
