= 39ers gang =

Drug clan in New Orleans, US

39ers Gang
- Founded: 2009
- Founding location: Central City, New Orleans 9th Ward of New Orleans
- Years active: 2009–present
- Territory: Third Street and Galvez Street Central City, New Orleans Gallier Street 9th Ward of New Orleans
- Ethnicity: Primarily African American
- Criminal activities: Drug trafficking, bank robbery, prostitution, murder, theft and kidnapping
- Rivals: Byrd Gang, Young Melph Mafia, Ride Or Die, 110ers, Taliban Gang, Dooney Boys

The "39ers gang," is a “hybrid” force of the Upper 9th Ward's G-Strip (Gallier Street) gang and 3-N-G, a notorious Central City drug gang named for its stronghold around Third and Galvez streets. Several of the alleged members also hailed from the Florida housing development. The gangs combined forces in early 2010 to press for control of the heroin trade in both areas, federal prosecutors allege, often through bloodshed against associates of rival gangs, such as "Ride or Die gang" from the 8th Ward of New Orleans and gangs associated with the former Calliope and Desire Projects. The gang is also held accountable for the double 2010 homicide in which the famous rapper Magnolia Shorty was killed. Authorities have connected the 39ers to over 45 murders.

== History ==
=== G-Strip ===
The G-Strip gang Gallier Street is a gang that operates in the 9th Ward of New Orleans. The gang is based around Gallier Street nicknamed "G-Strip". Members also controlled dope houses around the Desire and Florida Housing projects. NOPD Homicide detectives have linked the gang to various homicides around the 9th Ward.

=== 3-N-G ===
The "3-N-G" gang" 3rd and Galvez is a feared street gang operating in the Central City neighborhood of New Orleans. They are well known for their murderous reputation in the streets and violent acts towards other gangs including the Young Melph Mafia. The gang originated around Third and Galvez street near the Calliope Projects in the early 2000s and controlled the drug trade in Central City before joining forces with G-Strip gang to form the 39ers gang. In the early 2000s they were known to feud with another Central City gang called the "Calliope Porch Boyz". According to the New Orleans Police Department, the Porch Boyz where completely "wiped out" by 2003. This gave the gang notability in the city and attracted attention from the FBI and the ATF. In 2009 the gang clashed with the Byrd Gang at a Mardi Gras Parade which left seven people wounded by bullets.

== Indictment ==
- In February 2017 10 members of the gang were indicted on various charges including racketeering and murder. All men received maximum sentences in prison. The defendants were implicated in 14 murders, including the death of a local rapper and a federal Informant. The jury found all 10 guilty of a racketeering charge.
