= Metz Gang =

Defunct drug ring in New Orleans

- Founded by: Metz brothers
- Named after: Glenn Metz
- Founding location: New Orleans
- Years active: 1985–1992
- Territory: Central City
- Ethnicity: Mostly African-American
- Leader: Glenn Metz
- Criminal activities: Racketeering, extortion, money laundering, murder, robbery, drug trafficking
- Rivals: Various organizations over, Sam Clay organization

The Metz Gang was a notorious drug ring founded by Glenn Metz and his brother Cordell "Jethro" Metz; Glenn Metz is currently serving life in prison. From 1985 to mid–1992, The Metz Gang distributed approximately 1,000 kilograms of cocaine in the New Orleans metropolitan area and, in furtherance of the conspiracy, committed murders, attempted murders, and other violent crimes. In 1993, Metz, his wife, and several of his henchmen were convicted and charged in a 22 count indictment with various charges arising from a narcotics conspiracy. In 2016, President Barack Obama commuted the life sentence of Danielle Metz, wife of Glenn Metz.

== Overview ==
When crack cocaine took root in New Orleans in 1987, it seemed to spawn a pattern of crime as hyperkinetic and unpredictable as the drug itself. Dealers moved on to street corners as fast as others were arrested or killed. Alliances formed and dissipated from one big sale to the next. Profits evaporated in the thin smoke of an overnight addiction. Glen Metz's crew was the first organized drug gang the city has had besides Sam Clay's crew. After Sam "Scully" Clay was gunned down in the Calliope Projects in 1987, the drug market in New Orleans exploded with violence and mayhem. Metz's crew had dominated narcotics sales in several public housing complexes since 1985, maintaining power by killing anyone who dared to compete. In the early 1990s, NOPD began to crack down on gangs, arresting over 150 members and enforcers.

In 1992, enforcer Derrick Mahone broke out of the Louisiana Training Institute in Monroe. During the time he was free, he was arrested and released six times, four times on weapons charges. In 1993, he was gunned down in Algiers and barely survived. According to the Times-Picayune, Mahone was shot 17 times by three men who opened fire on him with submachine guns in a parking lot.

Following a trail of tips through rural Mississippi, in January 1993 federal authorities tracked down and arrested the last fugitive, Danielle Metz, at an apartment complex in Jackson, Mississippi. Metz was tracked down after information led U.S. marshals to Yazoo City, Mississippi, where several residents recognized photographs of the suspect, a deputy marshal said. Metz apparently had contacts in Yazoo County, said the marshal. on December 15, 1993, Danielle Metz was convicted of conspiracy to possess with intent to distribute and distribute cocaine, continuing criminal enterprise, possession with intent to distribute cocaine, and laundering of monetary instruments. U.S. District Judge A.J. McNamara sentenced her to mandatory life in prison.

=== 1992 Indictment ===
In 1992, enforcers Gennero "Meatball" Arthur and Gerald Elwood were arrested and indicted with 10 other members for murder and cocaine distribution. Elwood, who went by the nickname "Nap" and was reportedly one of the main hitmen for the Metz gang (along with Arthur), became famous for his customized Ford pickup truck that had armored plating inside of the frame and the words "VILLAIN IN BLACK" emblazoned on the sides of it and more famously "HOMICIDE" on the front of the hood. Elwood was arrested in 1991 after leaving a hotel in LaPlace, Louisiana with another Metz gang operative with drugs, weapons, and cash. He was found guilty for his role in the gang's operations and is currently serving life at FCI Coleman detention facility in Florida.

Arthur, who was suspected of killing 70 people, was arrested in a Seattle restaurant where he was hiding out as a dishwasher. A spokesman for the U.S. Marshals Service said Arthur is believed to have been hiding out in Seattle for two or three years. In his role as an enforcer, marshals say Arthur is believed to have machine-gunned to death three people and wounded two others in the so- called "Earhart Expressway Ambush" in 1990. On another occasion, marshals claim Arthur confronted a government witness in a housing project and machine-gunned the man in the legs, leaving him as an example to others who might consider testifying against the Metz group. Law enforcement officials also believe Arthur was the triggerman in the "Scully" Clay murder, although they were never able to get any sound evidence on him about that case, which remains unsolved to date.

== See also ==
- Crack epidemic in the United States
- List of New Orleans gangs
