= Christopher Homes Housing Development =

Former housing development in Algiers, New Orleans, Louisiana, United States

Christopher Homes, also known as Christopher Park Homes, was a scattered-site housing complex in the Algiers neighborhood, operated by HANO, with originally 250 townhouse style units which opened in 1971. It would be celebrated as the nation's first rent-to-own public housing. Since the complex first opened, disgusted homeowners have been driven away by Formosan termites and rotting wood left under the complex's flat roofs. Families also fled in the 1980s after a ceiling collapsed on a girl's head and a roof leak caused an electrical short that set a boy's bed on fire. Due to the poor living conditions, pests became a major problem for residents living in the Christopher Homes. There had been numerous reports about large rodents known as "Nutria Rats" roaming though the buildings and outside, but HANO refused to get the buildings fumigated.

In the early 2000s, Christopher Homes was severely run-down with only 150 units occupied as the rest were demolished or boarded up and abandoned. Several years before Hurricane Katrina, HANO, for reasons unknown, quit leasing the complex's vacant apartments. By 2005, only 80 units were occupied. In April 2013 The demolition on Christopher Homes was complete.
