= Edgar Mosely =

American jazz musician (1895–1961)

- Born: Edgar Paul Mosely; November 12, 1895; New Orleans, Louisiana, U.S.
- Died: October 28, 1961 (aged 65) Los Angeles, California, U.S.
- Genres: Jazz
- Instrument: drums
- Years active: 1914–1954

Edgar Mosley (November 12, 1895 – October 28, 1961) was an American jazz composer, and drummer from New Orleans, Louisiana. He is best known for his work with Kid Howard, Jim Robinson and George Lewis. Mosely is regarded as one of the greatest jazz drummers.

== Biography ==
Edgar Paul Mosely was born on November 12, 1895, in New Orleans, Louisiana, and was raised in the Algiers neighborhood. During his late teens he became a member of the Algiers Brass Band playing the drums alongside his older brother John Baptiste Mosely. He later relocated to the Tremé area in 1923 at the age of 28.

While in Tremé, Edgar studied with Kid Howard and began his professional career as a bass drummer with Howard's marching band in 1926 until 1943. In the 1930s he played on occasion with the Eureka Brass Band when he was not traveling with Kid Howard. He recorded with George Lewis in 1943.

In 1943, Mosely moved to California and played in Polo Barnes' Young Imperial Jazz Eagles band. Mosley also played with Kid Rena's, Red Allen's, and Chris Kelly's brass bands, as well as dance bands playing a trap set with Kid Rena.

Mosely retired in California, where he was musically inactive until 1954, when Paul Barnes enticed him to come out of retirement for a time. He died on October 28, 1961, in Los Angeles at the age of 65.
