= DeGaulle Manor =

Former housing project in Algiers, New Orleans, Louisiana, United States

Charles DeGaulle Manor Apartments
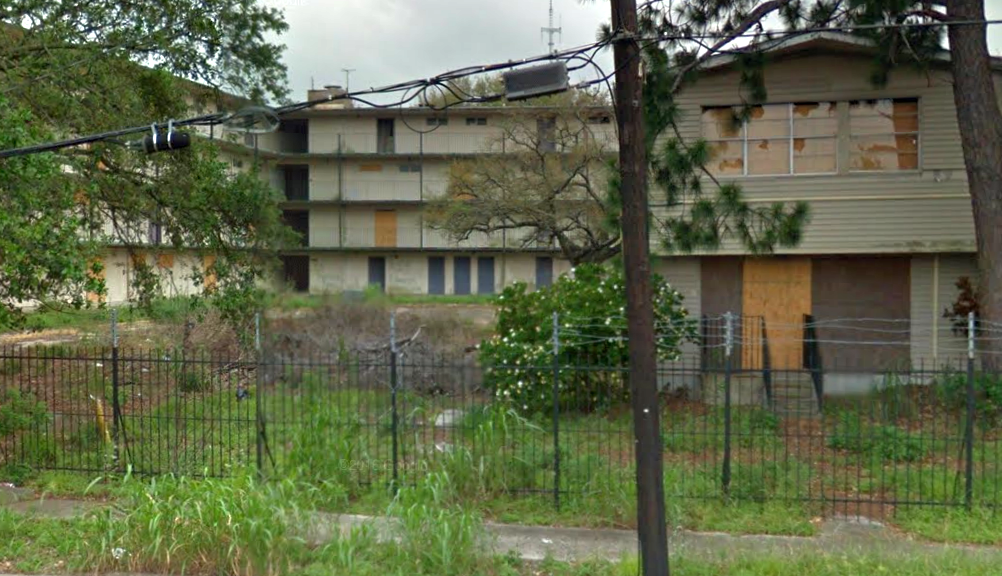
- Photograph of buildings viewed from Murl Street
- Interactive map of Charles DeGaulle Manor Apartments

General information
- Location: 3010 Sandra Drive, New Orleans, LA 70114
- Coordinates: 29.9295°N 90.0251°W
- Status: Vacated in 2005, partly reopened in 2007 and closed again in 2012

Construction
- Constructed: 1963–1964

Listing
- Demolished: Partly razed in 1996, demolition ongoing as of 2024

Other information
- Governing body: Louisiana Housing Corporation HUD
- Famous residents: Malik Rahim

DeGaulle Manor was a low-income public housing complex in the Algiers neighborhood of New Orleans. The apartment complex was known for crime and was one of the oldest and most troubled apartment complexes in the city before being shut down in 2012. It later became a dumping ground for trash and in 2014, became a work of art as it was transformed into a graffiti display.

== History ==
The 450-unit apartment complex opened in 1964, with 12 5-6 story mid-rise buildings originally known as "Bridge Plaza". Members from the Black Panther Party were among the first blacks to move into the apartments along with the New Orleans Saints players. Towards the early 1970s most of the 200 apartments were being leased by the Federal Housing Administration and some were being administered and subsidized by the Red Cross. It later became a low-income PBV assisted property by the Louisiana Housing Corporation (LHC), through U.S. Department of Housing and Urban Development (HUD). Between 1970 and the present, no owner kept the property for more than seven years; and each time that it changed hands, the new owners made little effort to rectify the many problems that arose under the supervision of the previous owners. By the mid-1980s only 364 units remained occupied as the rest were abandoned with squatters who would normally burglarize the apartments. With bad management, the apartments fell into terrible conditions with interior walls damaged from water leaks of rusted pipes and broken elevators. Large rats and cockroach infestations were commonplace as well as rotting garbage stacked up in clogged trash in the dumpsters. The balcony railings were rusted along with the security gates which did not close. The broken gates made the complex easily accessible for drug dealers to openly distribute narcotics. In 1993, the complex became one of NOPD's Fourth District hotspots for drug activity and violence. Robberies and killings occurred frequently to the point local taxi cab companies suspended cab services around the apartments for several months. In 1996, HUD razed 39 abandoned townhouse units that were allegedly being used as heroin dens. That year it was renamed the Live Oaks. HUD granted approval to sale the complex due to poor living conditions and it was then placed on the market. In December 2000 Woody Koppel, Neal Morris and Mark Schreiner bought the complex for $5 million in hopes of transforming it but many apartments still failed HUD inspections. By then it became ground zero for heroin sales, prostitution and violence. Locals nicknamed the area "D-Block". In 2005 after Hurricane Katrina struck, 135 out of 364 units were vandalized. One hundred families still lived in the apartments until they were evicted on Thanksgiving. Johnson Properties Group purchased the complex and was able to renovate 160 units. In 2007, Common Ground Collective bought the property from Johnson Properties Group, renaming it the Crescent City Gates Apartments. Only a portion of the complex was opened at the time and was in poor condition with termites and rodents infesting the apartments. North of Crescent City Gates were the Christopher Homes Development, another run-down housing complex torn down in 2013.

In 2024, The City of New Orleans announced the demolition of the complex which was on mayor LaToya Cantrell's blighted properties list known as the "Dirty Dozen". According to the city, "the ownership was found guilty of 15 violations, including deteriorating condition of sidewalks, driveways, exterior walls, porches, doors, windows and roof, as well as trash and debris, rodents and graffiti".

=== Kevin Mosley death ===
On October 28, 1999, 13-year-old Kevin Joseph Mosley was visiting his aunt. Mosley climbed out of an open hole in the top of the cab of the elevator and got stuck and was crushed. Several hours later, a wall was removed to retrieve him from the elevator shaft. Mosley was pronounced dead in the early morning hours of October 29, 1999. Mosley's wrongful death was caused by the negligence of DeGaulle Manor under the theories of strict liability, gross negligence, total neglect and negligence. Carolyn Kitzman was the manager of the apartment complex at the time of Kevin Mosley's death. Carolyn Kitzman communicated with existing tenants and employed and supervised the groundskeeping crews which cleaned the interior of the elevator cars.

== Police shootings ==
- April 6, 2000: A 12-year-old boy who was living in an abandoned apartment with his 13-year-old brother was shot in the neck by a New Orleans police officer searching the building for a murder suspect. The 12-year-old identified as Troy Harvey was rushed to Charity Hospital after he was shot around 7 p.m. by officer Ricky Blanchard, who said Troy sprang at him from a closet in the apartment at Vespasian and Murl streets. Troy and his brothers Adrien and Corey Harvey were all booked in jail for criminal trespassing and attempting to disarm a police officer. The brothers were later released.
- June 3, 2001: Fourth District police officer Kevin Smith fatally shot 18-year-old Erik Daniels who was being served an arrest warrant for aggravated battery. New Orleans Police Department reported he was shot in the chest around 3 p.m. in the 2300 block of Murl Street and died shortly after the shooting at Charity Hospital. Police spokesman Lt. Marlon Defillo said Smith believed the suspect was retrieving a weapon from under his shirt. Relatives of Erik Daniels disputed police accounts of the shooting, claiming authorities beat the victim and threw his body off of the balcony. No charges were filed against Officer Smith.
- November 8, 2001: A shootout erupted in the 2400 block of Murl Street between fourth district police and three men after the trio tried to elude authorities following an armed robbery. According to Times-Picayune, the men lead authorities on a wild chase before stopping in the back of the apartments and fleeing the car. 21-year old Carlos Smith began firing at them with a 45 caliber pistol on foot. Two of the officers returned fire in pursuit of Smith who've fled to the back of the apartments. Police would later apprehend Smith after his gun Jammed. The other men were also arrested and booked them with armed robbery. Smith was charged with two counts of attempted first-degree murder of a police officer.
- December 10, 2004: Fourth District's police commander, Capt. Louis Dabdoub, was injured in a shooting near the complex after he stopped a suspected truant. Dabdoub was shot in the leg by a teenager who opened fire on him, police said. Dabdoub fired several shots back, but then the suspect collapsed, got up and then fled into the complex. After the shooting DeGaulle Manor was placed on lockdown while police searched apartments for the suspect. The teen was caught and later charged in 2005.

=== 2005 double murder ===
On May 8, 2005, authorities discovered the decomposed bodies of two men, stuffed in the trunk of a car parked in the 2900 block of Vespasian Street. Officers arrived and found two men dead, both with gunshot wounds to the head. No arrests were made.

== ExhibitBe ==
In 2014, Brandan Odums and his graffiti crew transformed DeGaulle Manor into a graffiti art exhibit, painting murals of famous civil rights leaders and entertainers such as Tupac Shakur, Malcolm X, Martin Luther King Jr. and Muhammad Ali. The murals located on 3010 Sandra Drive attracted 3,000 people when Odums opened it as ExhibitBe on 15 November 2014. It was described as "the largest single-site street art exhibit in the American South". ExhibitBe closed in January 2015 with a concert including musicians David Banner, Erykah Badu, Dead Prez, Dee-1 and a performance by the Edna Karr High School Marching Band.

== In popular culture ==
Film

- The 2019 film Black and Blue was filmed at the complex as "Kingston Manor"
- Featured in season 1 in the 2015 TV series Zoo
- NCIS: New Orleans filmed at 2400 Murl Street
- Featured In the 2012 film Contraband
- Featured in the 2020 film "Project Power"
- Featured in season 1 in the 2018 TV series The Purge

== See also ==
- List of public housing developments in the United States
