= Algiers Brass Band =

Brass band in New Orleans

- Second line on Decatur Street, French Quarter, for deceased musician Albert "Pud" Brown.

Background information
- Origin: New Orleans, Louisiana, United States
- Genres: Brass band
- Years active: c. 1886–1947, 1987–present
- Past members: Irvin Mayfield; Papa Celestin; Tom Albert; Frank Bedell

The Algiers Brass Band is one of the oldest active brass bands in New Orleans Louisiana.

== History ==
They were originally formed sometime in the late-1880s in the Algiers neighborhood which is located directly across the Mississippi River from the French Quarter.

It is unknown who led the band during the early 20th century. According to The Daily Advertiser, the band have been active in the New Orleans area since 1886. The most well known members of the Algiers Brass Band is Papa Celestin who played cornet from 1904 to 1909. Tom Albert was also a member.

In 1947 the band disbanded and was reformed 40 years later in 1987 by Ruddley Thibodeaux. In 1990 the band performed with Danny Barker at Kingsley House for a Jazz Workshop sponsored by the Festival. They also led the second line for Freddie Kohlman's funeral.

The band is rarely found on a stage and known for leading the informal music of the streets for special occasions. In the early days the band regularly played at the pride of Algiers Masonic temple, eureka hall and Whitney Ballroom.

Frank Bedell, the driver involved in the May 9, 1999, Mother's Day bus crash that resulted in 22 fatalities, was a long-time member of the group. Bedell played the tuba with the band for more than 11 years. Despite struggling with severe health issues, he performed with the band at the French Quarter Festival and the New Orleans Jazz & Heritage Festival just weeks before the accident.
