= Algiers Point =

Historic place in Louisiana, US

- U.S. National Register of Historic Places
- U.S. Historic district
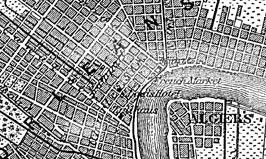
- Detail from an 1888 German map of New Orleans

- Location within East New Orleans Location within Louisiana Location within the United States
- Location: New Orleans, Louisiana
- Coordinates: 29°57′19″N 90°3′19″W
- NRHP reference No.: 78001428
- Added to NRHP: August 1, 1978

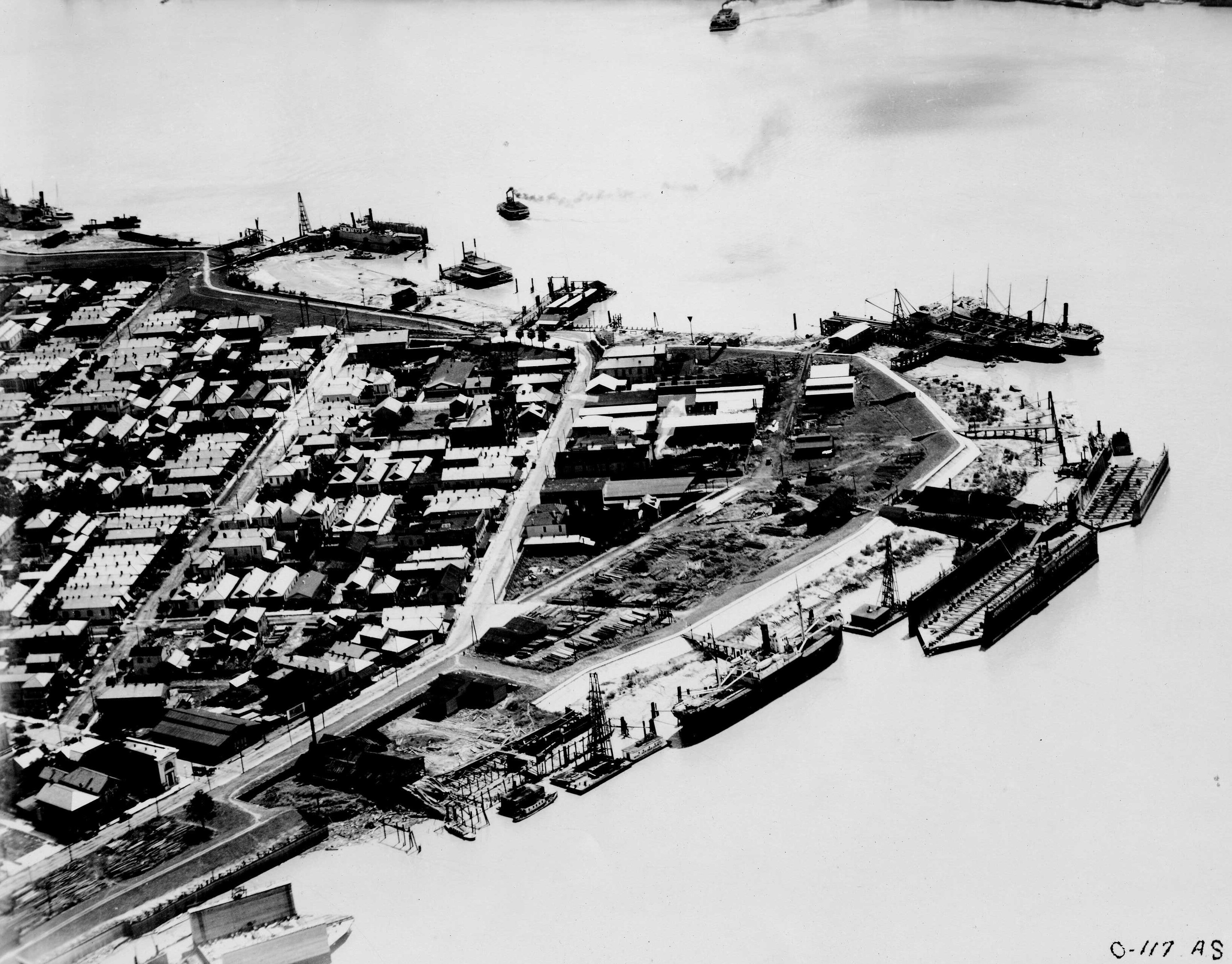
Algiers Point in 1922

Algiers Point is a location on the Lower Mississippi River in New Orleans, Louisiana. In river pilotage, Algiers Point is one of the many points of land around which the river flows—albeit a significant one. People from Algiers Point (and Algiers as a whole) are known as Algierines, or Algerines.

== Navigational point ==
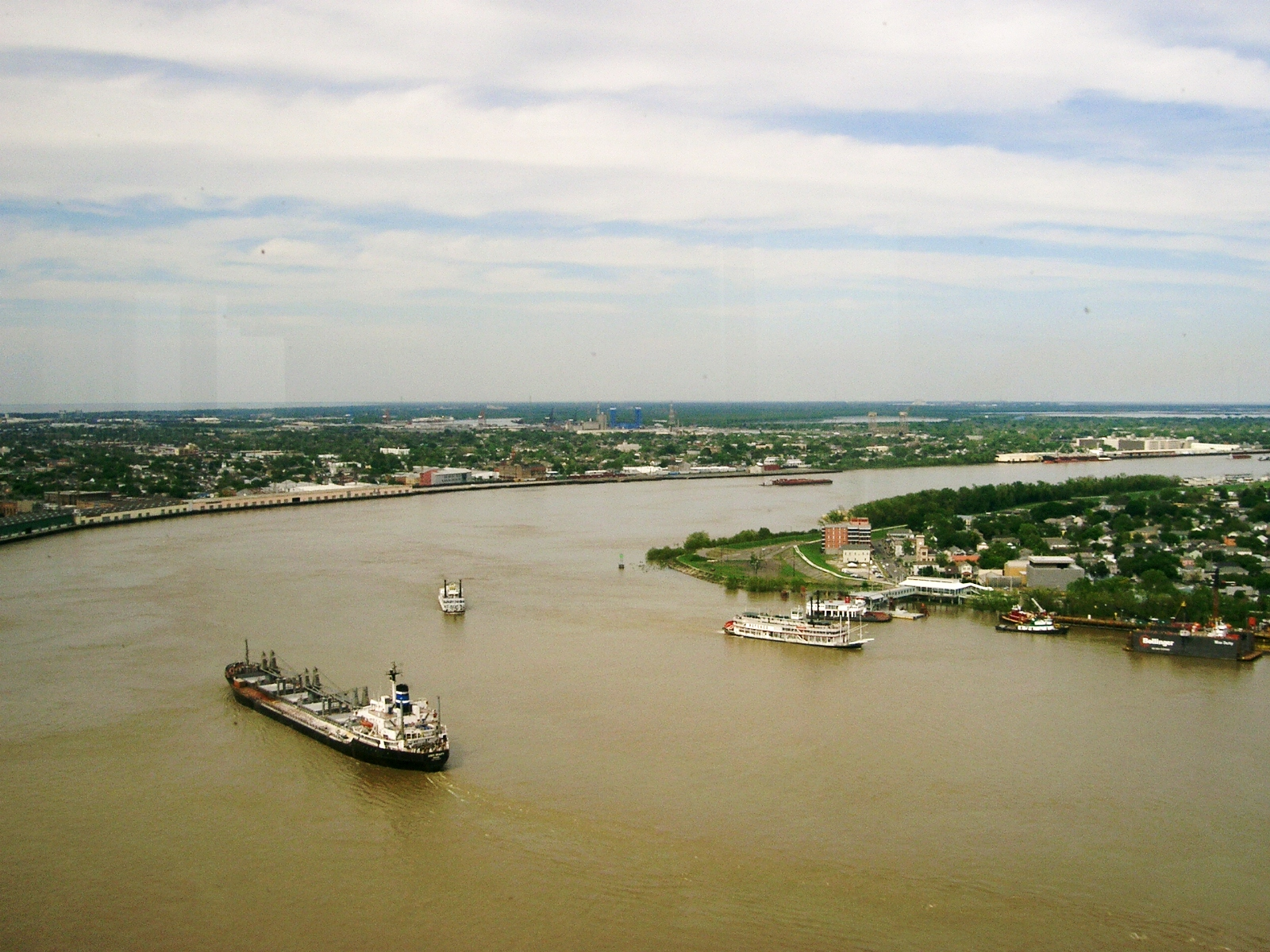
Rounding Algiers Point A downbound ship and other vessels on the Lower Mississippi River, with Algiers Point to the right

The course of the Mississippi River past and through New Orleans is in the shape of a crescent. As the river reaches the downriver end of that crescent, flowing by then in a northerly direction, it makes a sharp "right-hand" turn to the east. The French Quarter, Faubourg Marigny and Bywater lie on the outside of the bend on the river's left descending bank. The point of land on the river's right descending bank is, and has historically been, called Algiers Point.

Just off this point is where the Mississippi River is at its deepest, approximately 60 meters (200 ft) deep. This depth varies from year to year as the river alternately scours and deposits silt. A U.S. Coast Guard aid to navigation, Algiers Point Light "95," marks the point. Its geographic coordinates are 29°57′19″N 90°03′19″W

The U.S. Army Corps of Engineers' linear description of the location is mile 94.6 AHP (above Head of Passes) on the Lower Mississippi River.

In the 20th century, the Coast Guard began regulating marine traffic approaching and rounding Algiers Point. Licensed pilots were enlisted to man a tower atop the Gov. Nicholls Street Wharf across the river from the point, and to communicate with mariners via marine VHF radio and via a red and green traffic light, in order to restrict two-way traffic when high water makes such traffic hazardous.

== Neighborhood ==
This is a brief description of a neighborhood within the larger Algiers section of New Orleans.

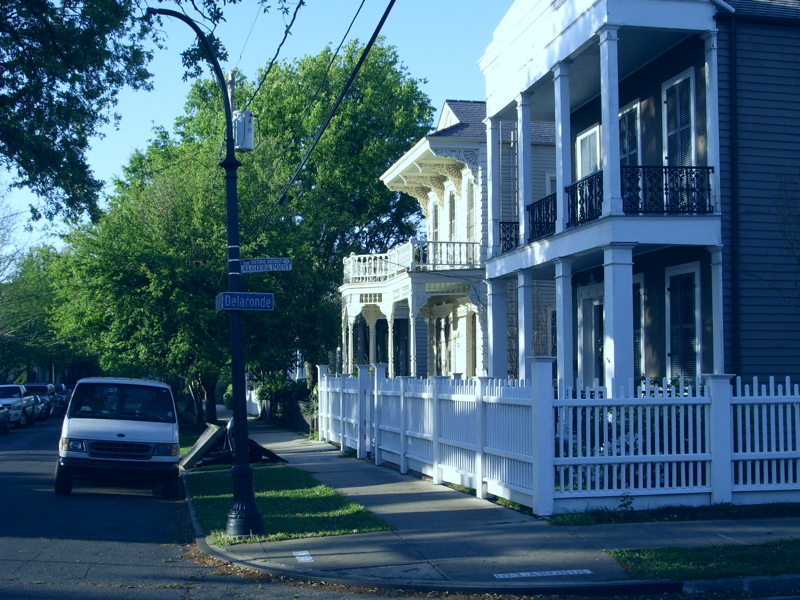
Algiers Point houses Late 19th-century houses at the corner of Delaronde and Olivier Streets

The size and boundaries of the neighborhood depend on colloquial or legal context, but a conservative description is the approximately 50 city blocks bounded by Opelousas Avenue, Atlantic Avenue and the river. Originally Algiers Point extended all the way to Newton Street but after the 1895 fire, many old structures were destroyed. Several streets were reconstructed and renamed including Market Street which was renamed Opelousas Avenue. Opelousas Avenue became the new border that separated Algiers Point from the McDonoghville section of Orleans Parish. However, some still refer to the area above Newton Street as Algiers Point with the street signs on Slidell and Homer Streets having the Historic Algiers Point District marker on them. The Algiers Point National Historic District still place Algiers Point at its original boundaries on the south by Slidell Avenue instead of Opelousas Avenue. The southern boundary of the city-regulated Algiers Point Historic District, as defined by the New Orleans Historic District Landmarks Commission, is Newton Street.

Numerous small businesses such as bars, restaurants, coffee shops, and professional services are located here, creating a mixed use neighborhood.

== Demographics ==
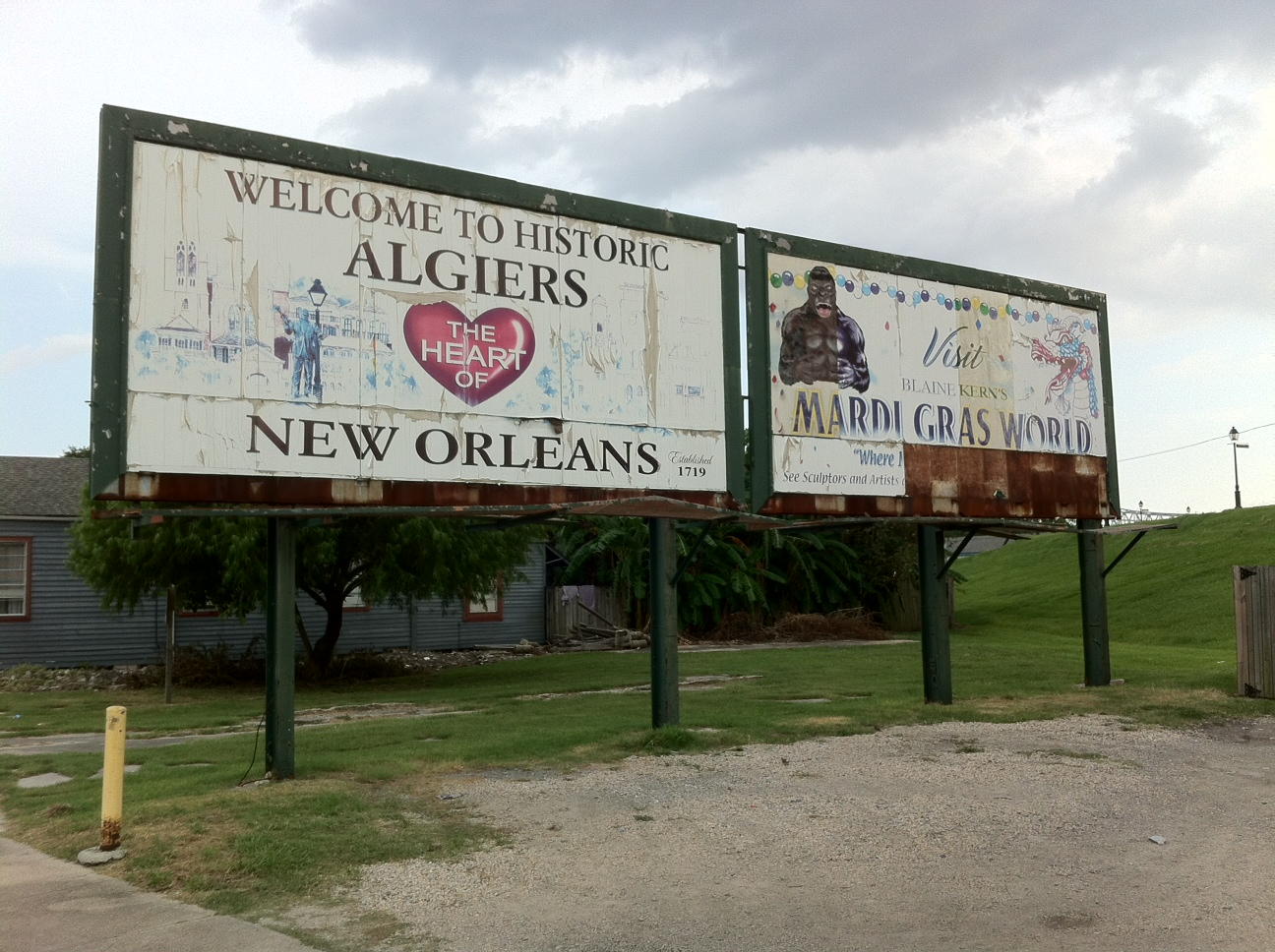
Algiers Point sign

As of the census of 2000, there were 2,381 people, 1,145 households, and 555 families residing in the neighborhood.

As of the census of 2010, there were 2,455 people, 1,229 households, and 574 families residing in the neighborhood.

== Education ==
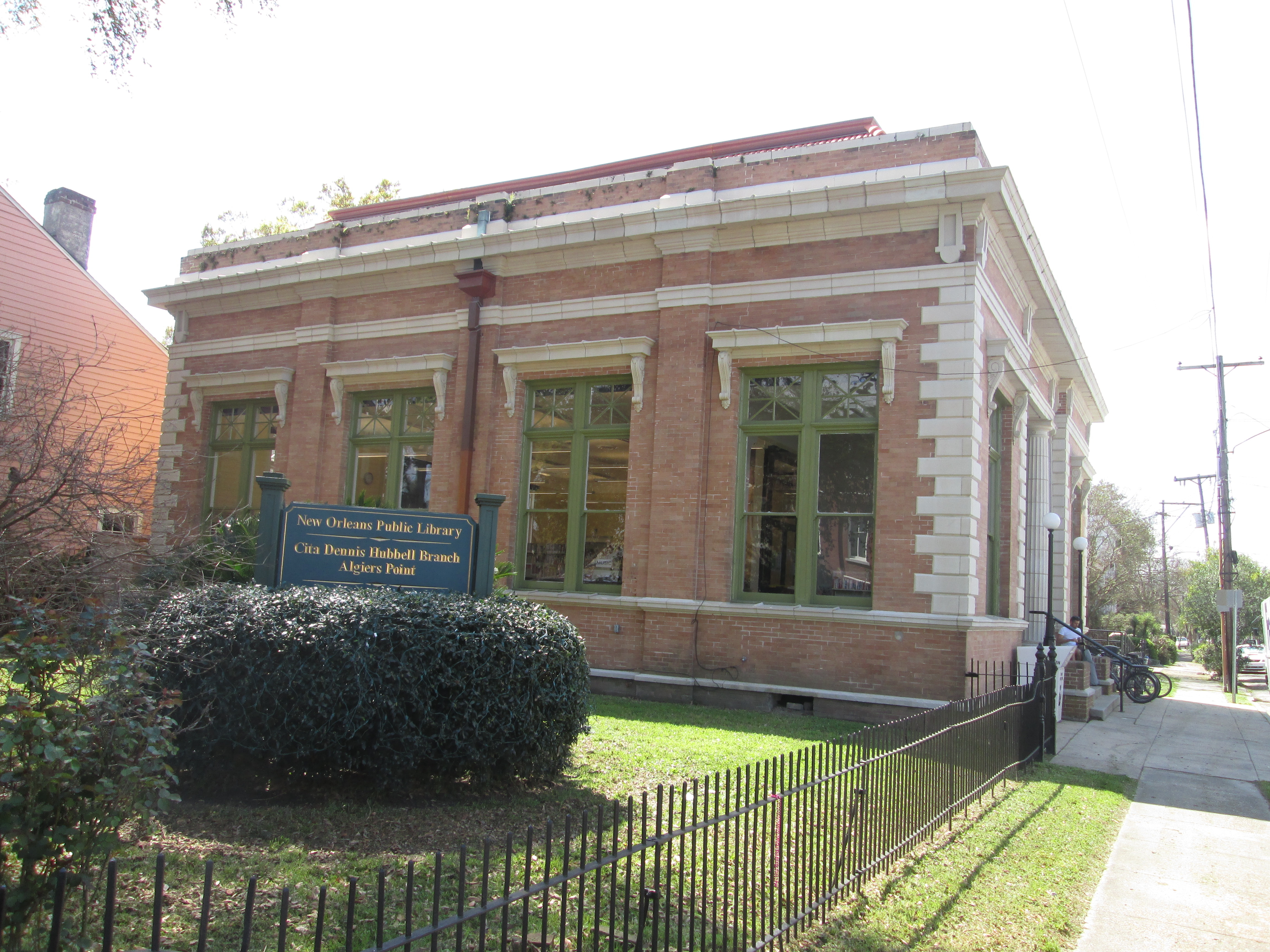
Cita Dennis Hubbell Library (formerly Algiers Point Branch)

Orleans Parish School Board (OPSB) or New Orleans Public Schools (NOPS) operates public schools. The Adolph Meyer School is an elementary school in the neighborhood which is listed on the National Register of Historic Places, and also known as the Harriet R. Tubman Elementary School.

=== Public library ===
New Orleans Public Library (NOPL) operates the Cita Dennis Hubbell Branch in Algiers Point. It occupies the oldest public library building in the city. It opened as the Algiers Branch, a Carnegie library, in 1907 and was the only library in the Algiers area for many years. It was one of five New Orleans Carnegie libraries, and as of 2013, one of two that are still open as libraries.

It was originally closed after the opening of the Algiers Regional Library, but Cita Dennis Hubbell and a group led by her campaigned to have it reopened, citing the long distance from Algiers Point to the new library. In 2005 Hurricane Katrina hit Algiers Point. Hubbell's daughter campaigned for the library to be reopened. It reopened shortly after Katrina, but when officials processed concerns about the structural integrity of the building they decided to close the library. The library closed in 2006, but then had termite damage and structural damage ameliorated with renovations. The branch held a grand re-opening in 2013.

== See also ==
- Algiers, New Orleans
