= Byrd Gang =

American criminal organization

- Founding location: Central City, New Orleans
- Years active: 2006–present
- Territory: Central City, New Orleans
- Ethnicity: Primarily African American
- Membership (est.): 30-50
- Leader: …
- Criminal activities: Drug trafficking, Murder, Theft and Kidnapping
- Allies: 39ers, BTY, AHM, Gerttown Hounds. Fischer Projects, 3NG
- Rivals: Ghost Gang Goonie Gang, Young Melph Mafia St Bernard Projects

The Byrd Gang also known as the Piff Gang or “M3”, is a criminal organization located in New Orleans, Louisiana. Detectives with New Orleans Police Department's Multi-Agency Gang unit previously described the Byrd Gang as "one of the most murderous gangs in town." The gang has a long history of violence which has made them gain notoriety among other gangs in the city.

== History ==
The Byrd Gang originated from the former C.J. Peete public housing development, known as Magnolia Projects, an infamous housing project in Central City. The gang has feuded with the 3-N-G gang for years, clashing with them during the 2009 Mardi Gras parade where seven people were shot, including a baby. The shooting made national headlines in the news and brought the gang to the attention of the FBI. In 2017, members of the gang were involved in a violent shootout on Magazine Street in broad daylight that left two men wounded. In November 2020, six members of the Byrd Gang were charged with murder and conspiracy to commit murder for fatally shooting a woman from Grass Valley, California after they attempted to purchase 30 pounds of marijuana from her with counterfeit bills and then attempted to flee. The woman and another person began to chase the Byrd Gang members. One of the members then pulled out his pistol and shot the woman in the head. Later in April 2019, 2 members were arrested for retaliation to the injustice murder of Torrence Allen.

== Indictments ==
In March 2018, three members of the Byrd Gang were indicted by a grand jury, charged with multiple counts of distributing heroin.

In August 2021, several members of the gang were indicted by the United States District Court for the Eastern District of Louisiana under charges of murder, racketeering, drug trafficking and RICO as well as other associated crimes.

== See also ==
- List of New Orleans gangs
