= Aurora, New Orleans =

Neighborhood in New Orleans, Louisiana, United States

Coordinates: 29.925°N 89.997°W

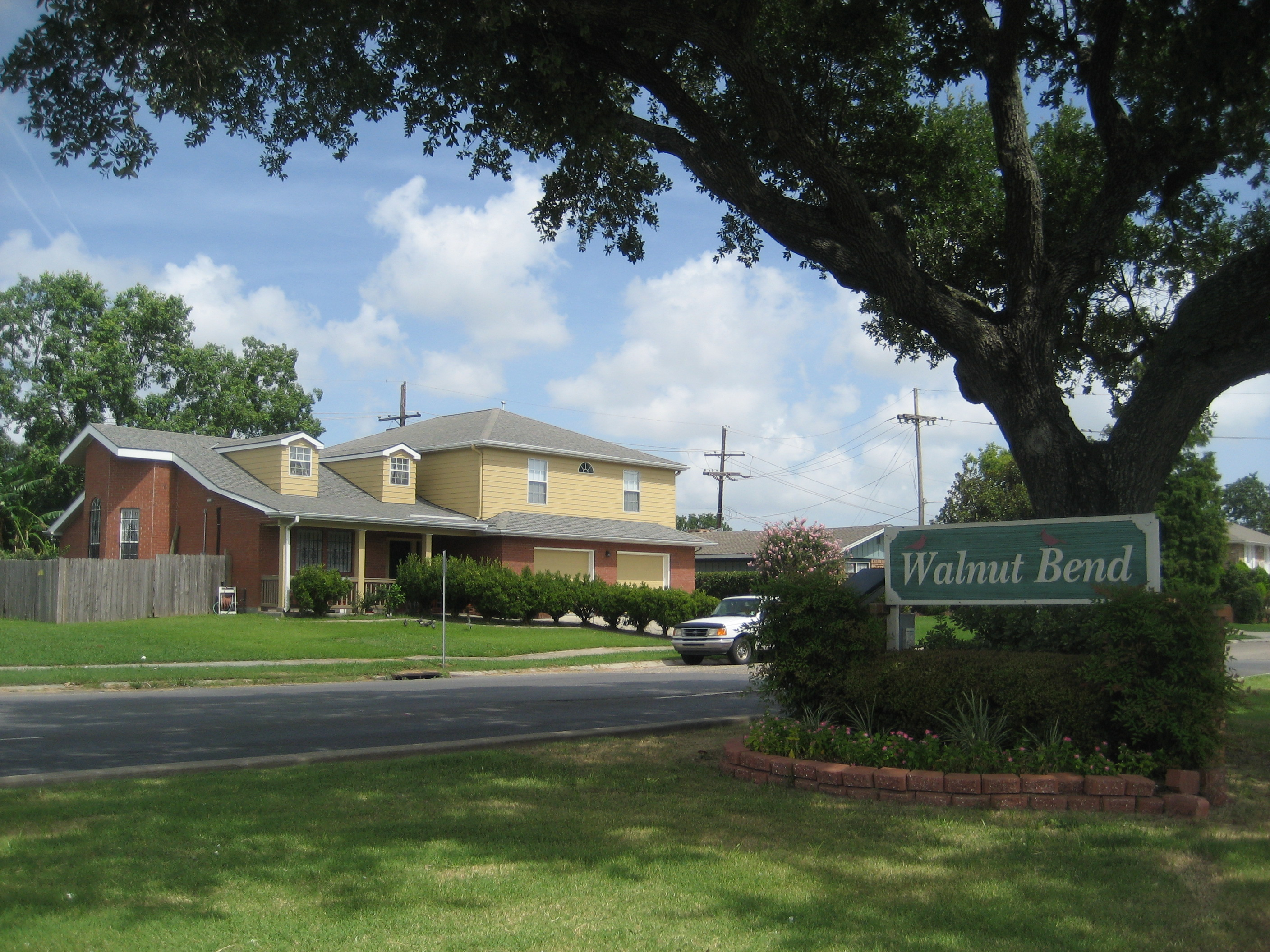
Walnut Bend

Aurora is a community of Algiers in New Orleans, Louisiana. It is divided into three areas: Old Aurora, Walnut Bend, and Huntlee Village.

From the 1950s, the original name of the Old Aurora neighborhood was Aurora Gardens. The residential subdivision was developed on acreage which formerly belonged to the Aurora Plantation.

Part of the Battle of New Orleans (1814–1815) was waged in Aurora along the west bank of the Mississippi River. There remain some earthworks near the river and a state historical marker to commemorate the event.
