= Corey Calliet =

American bodybuilder and actor

- Born: July 10, 1984 (age 42); New Orleans, Louisiana, U.S.
- Occupations: Internet personality, actor, fitness trainer, bodybuilder
- Years active: 2014-present

Corey Calliet (born July 10, 1984), is an American bodybuilder and fitness trainer for celebrities and television personalities. Calliet is best known for his work in transforming Michael B. Jordan for his lead role as Adonis Creed in the 2015 movie Creed. He has also worked with many other notable clients such as John Boyega, Terrence J, James Frecheville, Lance Gross, Flex Alexander, Tony Bellew, Steelo Brim, Frankie Delgado, Rocsi Diaz, Winston Duke, Tyreke Evans, Robbie Jones, Bronson Koenig, Martin Sensmeier, and Terrell Tilford. He has served as the lead trainer for major motion pictures such as Creed, Fantastic 4 and for Marvel's Black Panther.

Calliet was named one of the 50 most fit men in the world on the Flex50 list by AskMen Magazine in 2016.

Calliet has a featured role in Khloe Kardashian’s television show Revenge Body.

In 2025, Calliet was cast as pest control professional Big Ray in Season 2 of BET+ original series Churchy.

== Personal life ==
Calliet was raised in the poverty-stricken Algiers neighborhood of New Orleans, Louisiana, where he attended O.P. Walker High School. He then went on to Southeastern University. In 2014 he moved to Los Angeles, where he began his career.
