= St. Thomas Development =

Former housing project in New Orleans, Louisiana, United States

St. Thomas Housing Development
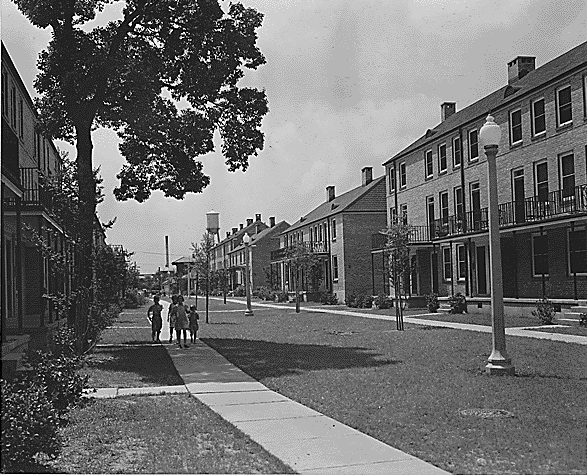
- Buildings on St Thomas St., early 1940s
- Interactive map of St. Thomas Housing Development

General information
- Coordinates: 29°55′34″N 90°04′21″W
- Status: Demolished

Construction
- Constructed: 1941-42

Listing
- Demolished: 1998-2001

Other information
- Governing body: Housing Authority of New Orleans
- Famous residents: DJ Jubilee; Thomas James Kirk II

St. Thomas Development was a notorious housing project in New Orleans, Louisiana. The project lay south of the Central City in the lower Garden District area. As defined by the City Planning Commission, its boundaries were Constance, St. Mary, Magazine Street and Felicity Streets to the north; the Mississippi River to the south; and 1st, St. Thomas, and Chippewa Streets, plus Jackson Avenue to the west. In the 1980s and 1990s, St. Thomas was one of the city’s most dangerous and impoverished housing developments. It made national headlines in 1992 after the deadly shooting of Eric Boyd. In 1982 Helen Prejean moved into the St. Thomas development in order to live and work with the poor. While there, Sister Helen began corresponding with Patrick Sonnier, who had been sentenced to death for the murder of two teenagers. After witnessing the executions, she sat down and wrote a book, Dead Man Walking. The book inspired the 1995 film Dead Man Walking. In 1998 the project was demolished and replaced with mixed income "River Garden."

== History ==
Initially the original site of the Irish Channel, bordered by Tchoupitoulas and St. Charles, between Felicity and Phillip streets, St. Thomas Development was one of the oldest housing projects of New Orleans. It was bordered by St. Thomas Street to the south, a service alley between Constance and Laurel Streets to the north, Felicity Street to the east, and Josephine Street to the west. St. Thomas housing development was originally designated for white occupants only. After the Civil Rights Act of 1964, all of the city’s public housing projects were desegregated. At that time, the residents were a group of racially diverse, low-income, working-class families. In the mid/late 60s, many of these families were forced out when the federal government decided that their income was too high. At the same time, there was a decrease in social services in the housing developments – a decrease many attribute to the money going into the Vietnam war. The exodus of industry from the inner city plunged the St. Thomas residents into great poverty, and subsequent White flight meant that, in recent years, residents have been primarily African American. Living conditions and crime became a problem during the mid-1970s when Heroin flooded the project. Problems in St. Thomas continued throughout the '80s and '90s. In 1996, the Housing Authority of New Orleans received a H.U.D. Hope VI grant to demolish and rebuild the area. The grant included the costs of relocating the nearly 3,000 then-residents to other properties.

By the end of 2001, all of the buildings except a few had been demolished to create a mixed-income neighborhood named "River Garden." A section of Chippewa Street was re-aligned in the process. Also, a new Wal-Mart superstore was constructed on long-vacant property one block south of the project site.

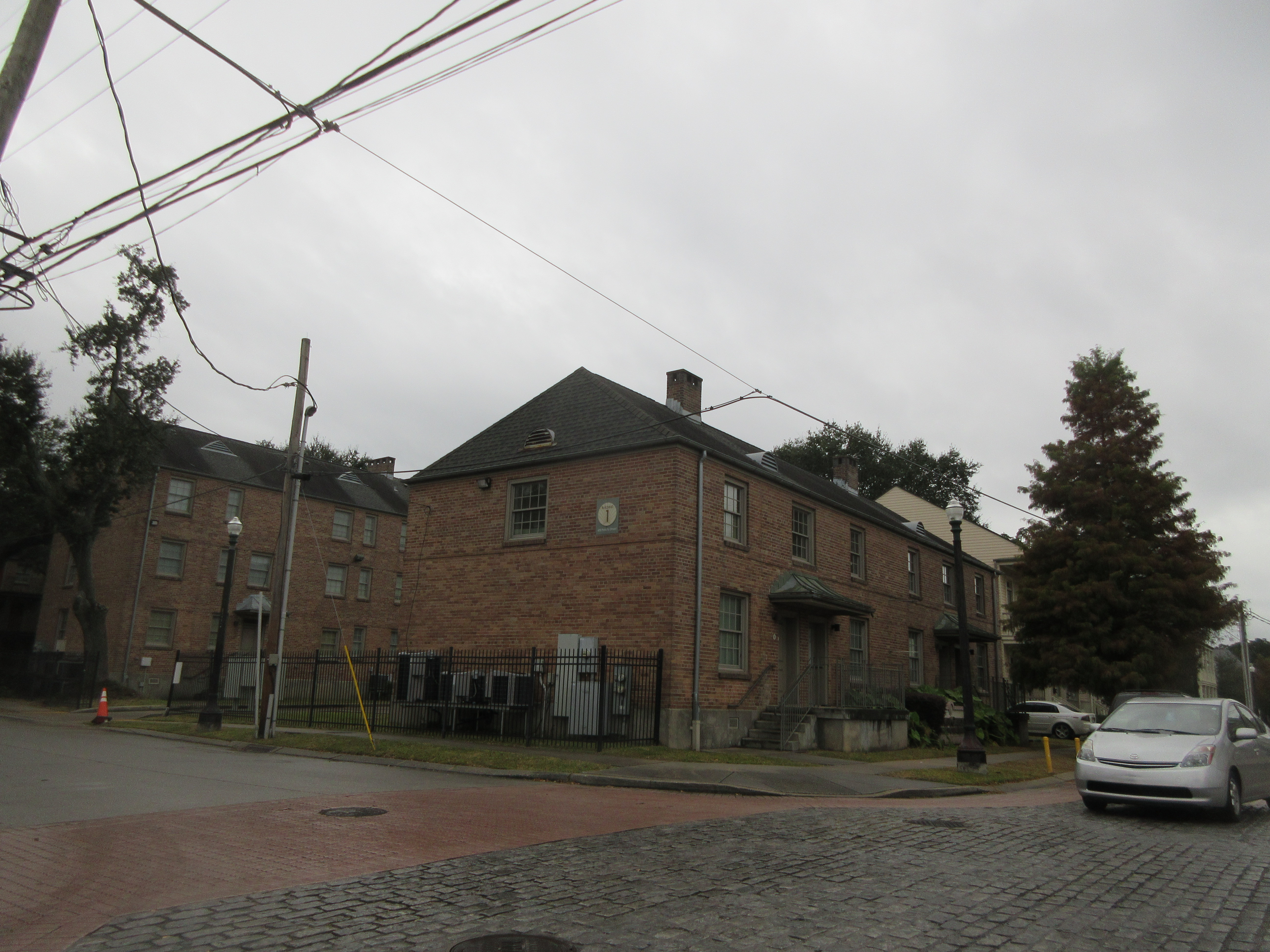
Surviving buildings from old St. Thomas Projects, New Orleans.

Construction of the rental property was completed in early 2009, with a final phase of construction focusing on condominiums and ground floor retail space. The plans for condominiums did not materialize and were substituted with additional subsidized rental property. Single-family housing was built near the center of the development. HRI, the developer, initially built approximately one-third of the planned number of single-family homes. The remaining homes were built later.

== Demographics ==
As of the census of 2000, there were 2,957 people, 834 households, and 608 families residing in the neighborhood. The population density was 12,857 /mi² (4,928 /km²). As of the census of 2010, there were 2,161 people, 1,001 households, and 471 families residing in the neighborhood.

== Crime and violence ==
The St. Thomas Housing Development was often considered one of the most dangerous housing projects in the country in the 1980s. Many residents boarded up their windows to prevent stray bullets from coming through. Police were also hesitant driving through St. Thomas and would often avoid passing down St Thomas Street for their own safety. In 1989, a stray bullet hit and killed a 5-year-old boy as well as injuring a 4-year-old girl. The bullet was not intended for the children, and hit the girl's shoulder while she played in a courtyard during a birthday party. Another 4-year-old girl was hit in the stomach as she played on her porch, and an 8-year-old girl was hit in the legs with a shotgun blast. In 1991, St. Thomas led all housing projects in rates of violent crime, according to the Housing Authority. From 1987 and 1991, St. Thomas tenants reported 48 murders, 27 rapes, 370 robberies and 638 assaults.

=== Shooting of Eric Boyd ===
On the morning of October 23, 1992 4-year old Eric Boyd was struck by a stray bullet in a courtyard in the St. Thomas Project. According to police, Boyd was stepping outside to walk to preschool when gunfire erupted in front of him in the courtyard. As the 4-year-old's family yelled for him to duck inside, a stray bullet pierced the wooden door frame and struck Eric in the chest.

== See also ==
- New Orleans neighborhoods
