= Fischer Projects =

Former housing project in Algiers, New Orleans, Louisiana, United States

William J. Fischer Housing Development
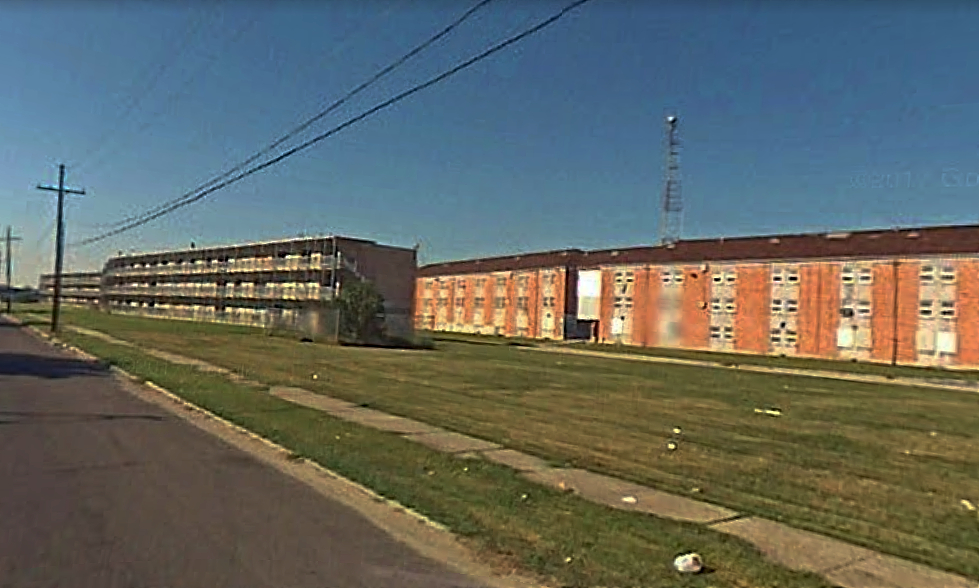
- William J. Fischer Housing Development last buildings before demolition.
- Interactive map of William J. Fischer Housing Development

General information
- Location: 1900 Whitney Avenue, New Orleans, LA 70114; United States
- Coordinates: 29.9215°N 90.0725°W
- Status: Demolished

Construction
- Constructed: 1964–65

Listing
- Demolished: 1996–2007

Other information
- Governing body: Housing Authority of New Orleans

The William J. Fischer Housing Development, better known as the Fischer Projects, was a housing project in Algiers, New Orleans, Louisiana, United States. It was known notoriously for a series of high-profile murders in the 1970s and 1980s. It was the last conventional public housing development constructed in New Orleans, and one of the first to begin demolition. It originally consisted of a 13-floor high-rise and fourteen 3-floor units. The area has been undergoing redevelopment since about 2004 and currently none of the original low-rise buildings remain. The development is located along Whitney Avenue in the Algiers area of the city's west bank, which is part of the 15th Ward and is named for William J. Fischer who served as chairman of HANO in the 1950s. The property is now converted to a small low-income housing development.

== History ==
The Fischer Housing Projects was constructed in January 1964 and opened in 1965 on 48 acres (190,000 m^{2}) of land adjacent to the Mississippi River Bridge and its approach roads. The development was isolated from other West Bank communities by the bridge, the Donner Canal and a Southern Pacific Railroad line. The 14 low-rise buildings were built in long parallel lines and positioned using the scattered site method resulting in large park areas covering approximately 60% of the 48-acre (190,000 m^{2}) site. A 13-story high-rise building was constructed in 1966 and served as housing for the elderly. Upon completion of the high-rise, the development had a total of 1002 units. The development also included Murray Henderson Elementary School, constructed in 1965 and William J. Fischer Elementary School which opened in 1967. Over its relatively short existence, the development became rundown and saw a rise in violent crime similar to other public housing developments in New Orleans and around the country. The Fischer Projects made national headlines in the news in 1980 when a police officer was murdered. In retaliation of the murdered officer, four black men were killed in a raid by officers.

== Crime problems ==
The Fischer housing projects have been notorious for violence since the 1970s, however the problem itself had likely existed since it was opened. In the early 1980s police brutality between the New Orleans Police Department and Fischer residents grew to concern after police officer Gregory Neupert was killed by a sniper while patrolling the project at night. The violent police response to Neupert's killing led to the federal indictment of seven officers. They would be known as the "Algiers 7." After the officers indictment, policemen were afraid to enter back into the project in fear of being killed. A sniper set uptop the Fischer high-rise building and regularly fired at police passing.

In May 1989 a gunman sprayed a crowd with bullets in a courtyard in the Fischer, resulting in the death of a man and four injuries. The next month a veteran police officer who was on a stakeout in the project, narrowly escaped serious injury when a gunman riddled the officer's van with bullets, police said. Officer Gary Dewey, was showered with broken glass and possible metal fragments at 9:38 p.m. in what appeared to be an attempt to kill him. Crime was so ferocious in the Fischer to where The Regional Transit Authority had to discontinue nighttime service through Fischer and along Whitney Avenue after several buses were shot at or had bricks and rocks thrown at them. In May 1991 one person was killed and five were wounded in a shooting spree in the project. The shootings had occurred a couple hundred yards from Fischer Elementary School. The most famous murders of the Fischer Projects were the murders of nursing student Jo Ellen Smith, Claudette McGowan and her eight-year-old child, and the murder of Officer Gregory Neupert.

=== 1990 crime crackdown ===
In the summer of 1990 the police arrested 18 people and seized two machine guns as part of a crackdown on crime in the Fischer housing project. Police beefed up patrols in the project since the end of August 1990 to curtail drug dealing and violence. Marked and unmarked patrol cars spent eight to nine hours twice weekly in the 1,500-unit complex instead of the occasional drive-through they use to do the monitor drug dealing.

=== JoEllen Smith murder ===
On Tuesday April 10, 1973, police found the body of 22-year-old nursing student JoEllen Smith near the Fischer Projects, between Atlantic and Socrates Streets. She had been missing since Sunday April 8, 1973. Smith suffered from four gun shot wounds to the head and had been sexually assaulted. She had attended the Fischer Projects to provide care for an elderly resident. Steven Berry and Timothy Rudolph, both of whom had criminal records for violent offences, were charged with Smith's muder. Following her murder, Smith's father set up a foundation called the JoEllen Smith Foundation that aided the community, and a hospital was constructed and built in remembrance of her life, called the JoEllen Smith Memorial Hospital. The hospital was demolished in 2016.

=== Shooting of Officer Adams ===
On Saturday May 26, 1979, 21-year-old rookie cop Wesley Adams, was critically wounded during a gun battle in the Fischer Projects. According to New Orleans police spokesman, the incident began when four plainclothes Gretna policemen spotted two known drug traffickers leaving a Gretna bar. The detectives including Adams then followed the men by car to the Fischer, where the men then eluded them. Shortly after 8pm officers entered the project on foot, where they confronted the pair in front of an apartment building. One of the men was identified as Jimmy Pierce, a well known narcotics dealer in the neighborhood. Authorities stated Pierce came back home to New Orleans from Chicago to visit relatives and was rumored to have possibly running drugs for a big-time dealer. The officers approached the group believing a drug transaction was in progress. Pierce backed into a hallway and when officers identified themselves, he emerged with a 45-caliber automatic firing at the officers. Adams was struck once in the chest. Detective Stan Ferguson returned fire, killing Pierce. The other men that were with Pierce drew their guns but then fled into the buildings and escaped on foot. After the shooting, officers searched Pierce and found a bottle of “T’s and blues”(street name for Talwin and pyribenzamine). At the time, the drug was in frequent use due to it producing a heroin-like high when taken together.

=== Murder of Officer Gregory Neupert ===
On November 9, 1980 Gregory Neupert, a police officer, was shot and killed making his rounds near Fischer Projects. His body was found in ditch the next day. This death sparked a huge controversy and lead to the raid of the Fischer projects by the New Orleans Police Department. Four people were killed due to the raid and black community members became enraged, claiming that the New Orleans Police Department was out of control and that their raids had become brutal. Later these officers would be remembered as the Algiers 7. The police officers in the Algiers community were enraged, some were in search of redemption for Officer Neupert, other for redemption of the slain people caught in the cross fires laced in anger in the raid. The murder of Officer Gregory Neupert and the four people murdered by the police resulted in a civil rights protest against the New Orleans Police Department, citing racism and police brutality.

=== Claudia McGown & Leslie McGown murders ===
On August 25, 1987, William J. Brown murdered his girlfriend, Claudia McGown and her daughter Leslie in McGown's apartment in the Fischer Projects. Brown stabbed McGown then threw McGown's three children from the balcony of the third storey apartment. Eight year old Leslie McGown was killed by the fall and the other two children were injured. Brown was reportedly intoxicated by a drug called “clickum Juice,” a concoction containing PCP, at the time of the murders. Residents of the Fischer Projects reported that use of “clickum Juice” and heroin were widespread in the community. Brown was arrested shortly after and charged with two counts of murder and two counts of attempted murder.

== Redeveloped into low-income housing ==
Starting in the early 2000s, HANO began planning a redevelopment of the complex. These plans included expanding the site to 73 acres (300,000 m^{2}) by acquiring adjacent properties, phased demolition of the high-rise and low-rise housing units, and construction of at least 640 new housing units. Additionally, the plans included a new community for elderly residents, a community center and playgrounds.

The Fischer high-rise was imploded on January 25, 2004, drawing large crowds as New Orleans' first demolition by implosion. Replacing the high-rise were numerous low-income houses.

Demolition of the last three low-rise buildings began in January 2008 as part of a $1.2 million project to remove the vacant buildings and construct the infrastructure necessary for redeveloping the area. Plans for this stage of redevelopment call for construction of approximately 70 homes and 26 rental units, most of which are intended for public housing and Section 8 residents.

== Demographics ==
As of the census of 2000, there were 2,034 people, 506 households, and 425 families residing in the neighborhood.

As of the census of 2010, there were 849 people, 269 households, and 171 families residing in the neighborhood.

== See also ==
- Housing Authority of New Orleans
