= Housing Authority of New Orleans =

Housing authority in New Orleans, Louisiana, United States

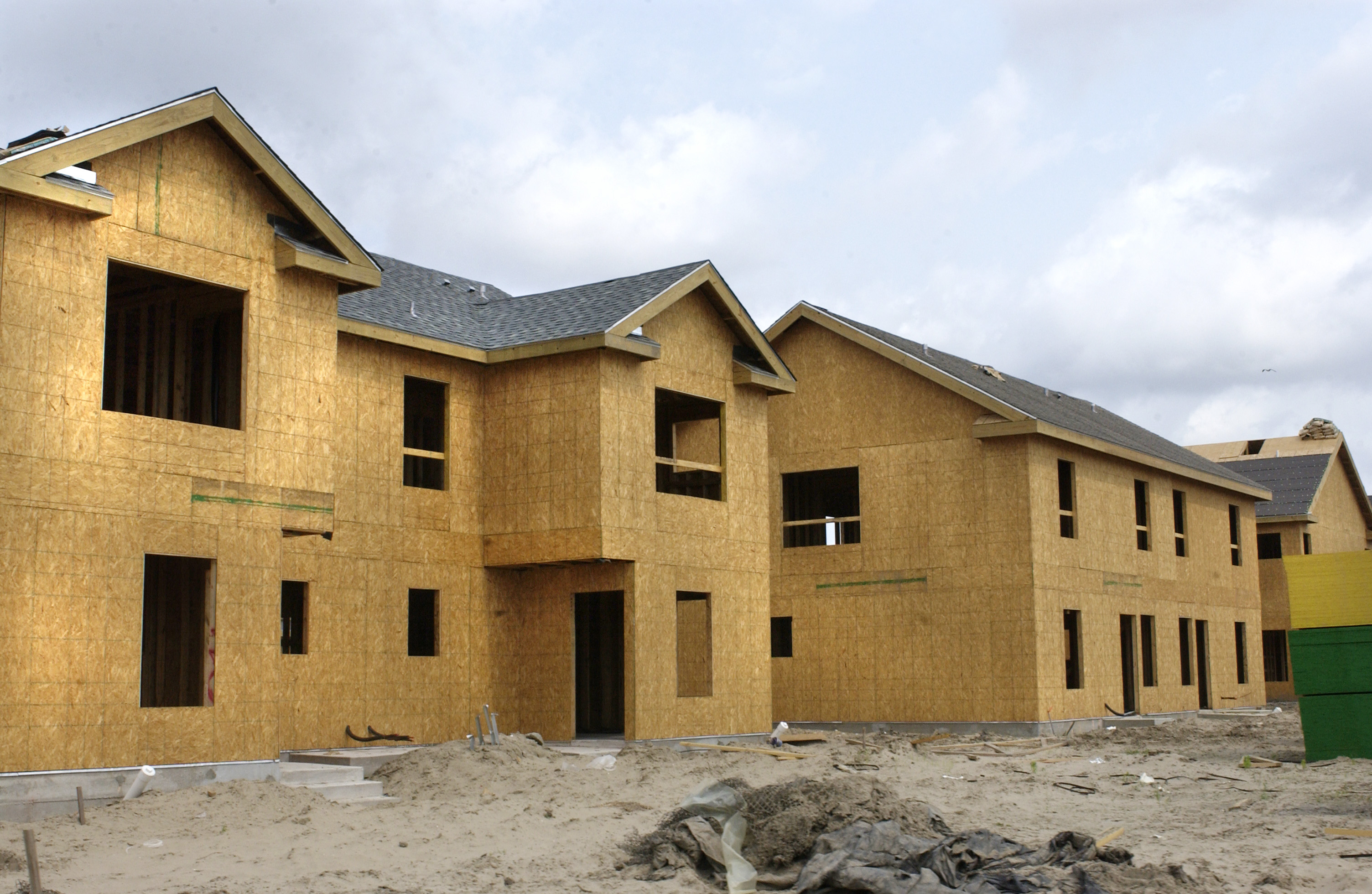
These are homes being built by the Department of Housing and Urban Development

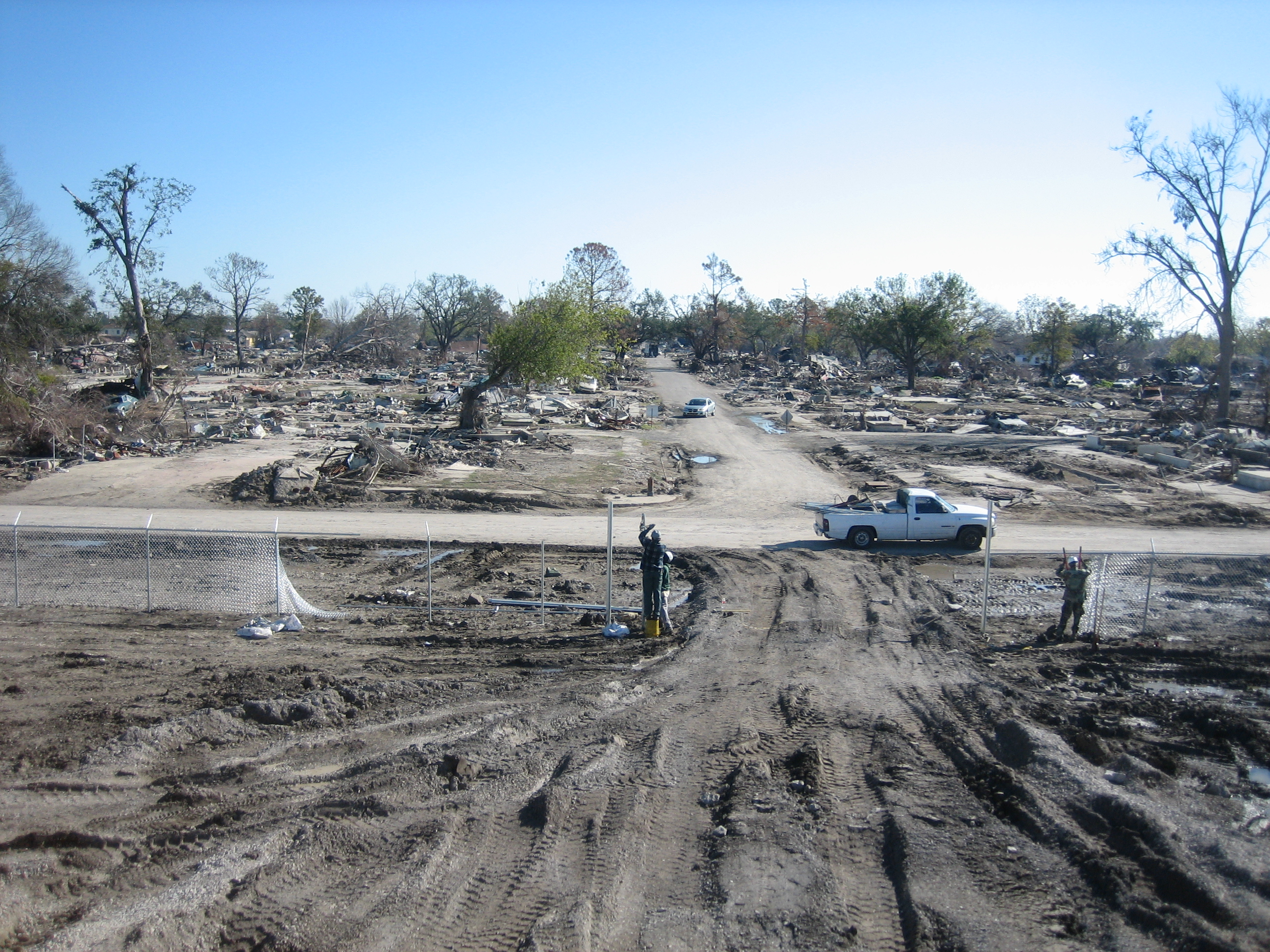
This picture shows the destruction of the 9th Ward after Katrina. Thousands of people displaced by their homes.

The Housing Authority of New Orleans is a housing authority in New Orleans, Louisiana, tasked with providing housing to low-income residents.

== History ==
Public housing in New Orleans has been subject to federal control for a number of years before Hurricane Katrina. These housing projects in New Orleans have also been home to important cultural contributions, such as the birth of Bounce music. In 1936, the Louisiana Legislature passed the Housing Authority Act, allowing for the creation of the Housing Authority of New Orleans and paving the way for the city to participate in the national low-rent housing program. Some of the first developments broke ground between 1938 and 1940 over slums and old stores in the Tremé and Uptown area. The Lafitte, Magnolia, Calliope and St Bernard known as the Big Four, all opened in 1941 to black families. St. Thomas and the Iberville developments opened for whites in 1942. In the 1950s the Florida and Desire developments opened in the 9th Ward neighborhoods with the Desire for blacks and Florida for whites. Families of the Desire claimed that the new project was run-down while the Florida was nicely built in good condition. Between 1961 and 1964 HANO construed two more housing projects for low-income black families. The Melpomene housing project opened in 1964 in Central City with the Fischer opening in 1965 in Algiers. Both projects contained a high-rise building and an elementary school. By the early 1970s, the projects had severely declined with crime and poor living conditions being the main problems. Residents complained to HANO and the state for funding but no money was funded to renovate the run-down developments. Certain projects were so bad police refused to enter them fearing for their lives. Other projects like the Lafitte remained peaceful and with very little crime due to neighborhood watch groups. Drugs like heroin played a major role in corruption as well as abandonment of law enforcement. Throughout the 1980s and 1990s violent crimes and murders made New Orleans projects one of the deadliest in the country with an average of 40% of the city's killings taking place in public housing projects. In 1986, crime statistics complied by NOPD showed that generally in three housing projects considered the most dangerous -Desire, St. Thomas, Fischer, had the less police response from 911 dispatch. In 1990, Housing Authority and the New Orleans Police Department was offered 1 million in federal grants for police sub stations in the city's most troubled developments. The substations were planned to reduce crime mainly for the St. Thomas and Fischer developments, which at the time was leading the city in violent crimes. However plans for the substations did not go through and in 1993, New Orleans tailed 395 killings. The death toll was more per capita than in the country's five largest cities; 99 of New Orleans' slayings were on public housing property. Even in Chicago, with three times the number of public housing residents, the housing authority recorded half as many murders as New Orleans did in its developments After Hurricane Katrina many of HANO's residents was forced to vacate their apartments due to water damage although many buildings sustained only minor damage. At the time of the storm, the Housing Authority of New Orleans was serving 14,129 families. Out of those, 64 percent, or 8,981, received vouchers, while 36 percent, or 5,148, were in public housing. After families moved out many projects were demolished and converted into mixed-income townhouses. Between 2005 and 2013 HANO demolished all of its properties with only a couple of buildings preserved as historic landmarks.

== List of New Orleans housing projects ==
=== Uptown projects ===
- C.J. Peete (Magnolia) ł Central City
- Guste (Melpomene) ł Central City
- B.W. Cooper (Calliope) Central City
- St. Thomas ł Lower Garden District

=== Downtown projects ===
- St. Bernard ł Seventh Ward
- Desire ł Ninth Ward
- Florida ł Ninth Ward
- Lafitte Treme
- Iberville ł Iberville area

=== Westbank projects ===
- Fischer ł Algiers

=== Scatter Sites ===
- Christopher Park Homes (first rent to own housing complex)
- Imperial Drive
- Press Park
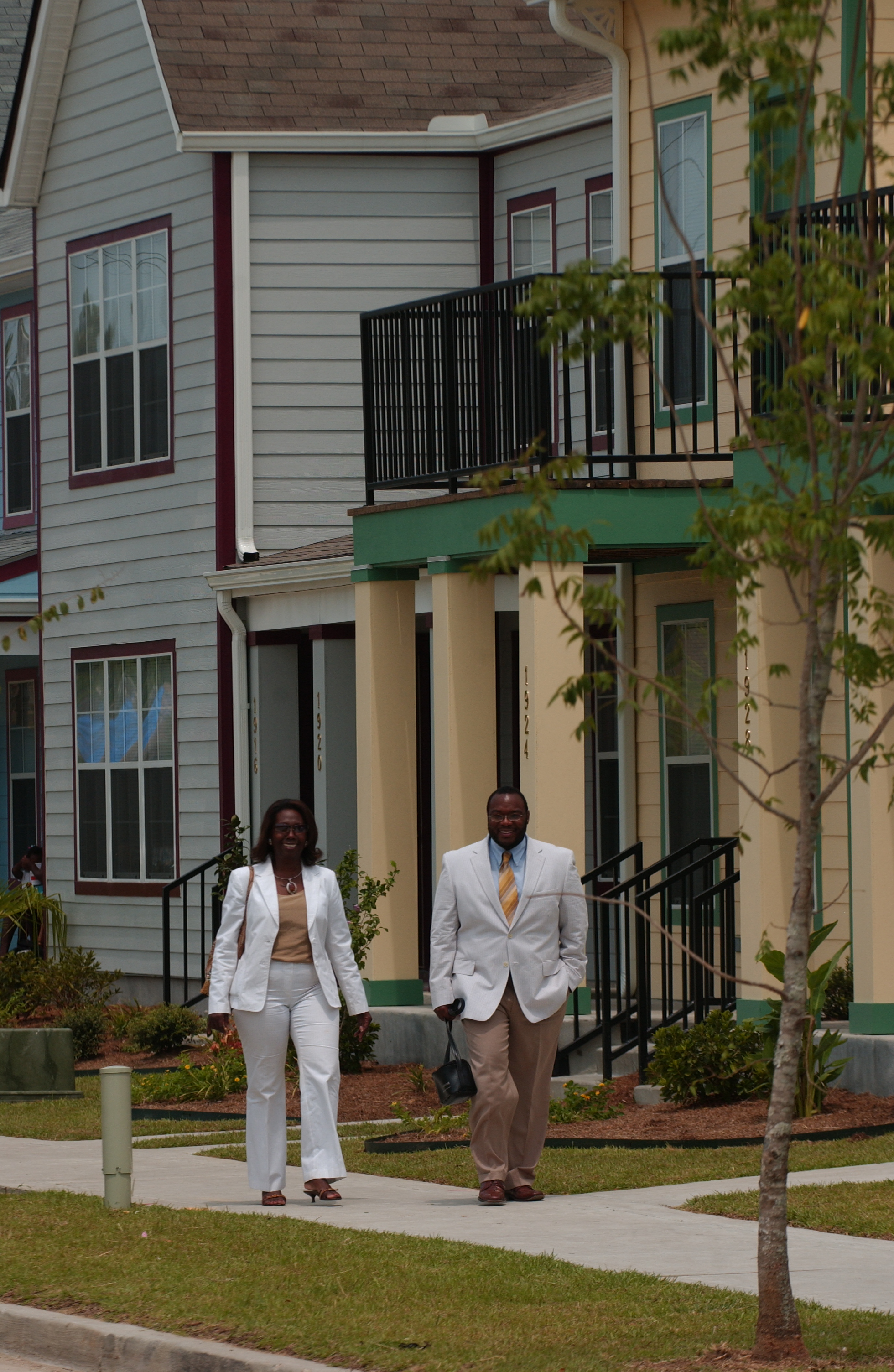
  Newly built public housing is being visited one year after Katrina. Providing spaces for a few families.
- 410 Pleasant Street
- 2331 Annunciation Street
- 1229 Constance Street
- Hendee Homes

== Police Department ==
In June 2011, Senate Bill 78 of the Regular Louisiana Legislative Session, introduced by Senator Edwin R. Murray of New Orleans and then HANO Chief Mitchel S. J. Dussett created the Housing Authority of New Orleans Police Department. The statute gave the officers the same authority as that of the Louisiana State Police. Currently the department employs full-time commissioned police officers who are primarily responsible for providing protective services within and around the public housing developments. In addition, these officers provide assistance to the New Orleans Police Department on a daily basis by answering calls for service in and around the developments. The officers employed by HANO have the authority to effect arrests, issue traffic citations, issue municipal summons and enforce municipal, state and federal laws.

== Post-Katrina reductions and controversy ==
=== Lawsuit ===
On June 27, 2006, a class action lawsuit was filed by displaced residents of New Orleans public housing to challenge the plan of the United States Department of Housing and Urban Development (HUD) to reduce the number of public housing units in the city from 5,100 before Hurricane Katrina to only 2,000 units.

=== City council vote ===
The New Orleans city council voted unanimously on December 20, 2007, to allow HUD to destroy 4,500 units of low-income housing. HUD planned to replace the units with mixed-income housing. The city council took this decision despite protests that were at times violent.

== Racial composition ==
No direct public housing racial statistics are available for the City of New Orleans however, racial data from HUD's Resident Characteristics Report, as of December 31, 2013, indicate that of the 2,078 public housing units in Orleans Parish, 1,974 (95%) of the occupants are black, or about 1% of the Parish's overall black population of 206,985 (60.2%). The corresponding HUD statewide figures for Louisiana's 21,708 public housing units show that 17,366 (80%) of the occupants are black, or, again, about 1% of Louisiana's black population of 1,498,652 (32.4%). Blacks occupy 874,000 (46%) of the 1,900,000 public housing units nationwide, or about 2% of the 39,684,125 (12.5%) black people in America.
