= ROD Gang =

New Orleans drug ring

Ride or Die
- Founded: 2007
- Founding location: 8th Ward of New Orleans
- Years active: 2007-2013
- Territory: St. Roch
- Ethnicity: Primarily African American
- Criminal activities: Drug trafficking, Murder,
- Rivals: 39ers gang

The "Ride or Die Gang," was a small murderous drug ring that operated in New Orleans. Authorities stated the crew violently ruled narcotics activity in the St. Roch neighborhood from 2007 to 2013.

Members formed their crew among the trailers parked in St. Roch Park after Hurricane Katrina, a group of neighborhood teens that, prosecutor allege, sold drugs in the 8th Ward and ruthlessly defended their turf. Federal investigators said the gang used an abandoned house on Mandeville Street as a base of operations to package, sell and store narcotics, as well as store firearms. The Multi-Agency Gang Unit have been tracking the gang since 2010 and reported they dealt crack, marijuana and heroin in the St. Roch.

In 2013 twelve members were indicted on murder and racketeering charges. According to a 33-page indictment, members of the gang had been arrested repeatedly with crack cocaine, marijuana and heroin. The 20-count federal indictment also accused three men of murder.
