= FnD Gang =

Drug clan in New Orleans, US, 2006 to 2013

- Founded: 2006
- Founding location: Seventh Ward of New Orleans
- Years active: 2007-2013
- Territory: Frenchmem Street and Derbingy Street
- Ethnicity: Primarily African American
- Criminal activities: Drug trafficking murder,
- Rivals: PCB 7th ward, Deslonde Boys

FnD gang is a small violent drug organization in the Seventh Ward of New Orleans. The Frenchmen and Derbigny gang, or "FnD," operated from 2007-2013. The gang was most notable for the 2013 Mother's Day mass shooting that left 20 people wounded. The shooting made national headlines which led to a massive indictment on the gang in 2013. Despite many of the gang members getting lengthy sentences in prison, the gang is still very much alive and active and has since been rebranded as French bread or simply the bread which is a play off the street original name Frenchmen

== Overview ==
According to court documents, the FnD gang was an enterprise engaged in racketeering under federal law. Members of this gang, conspired to commit numerous overt acts in furtherance of the gang's activities. Gang members sold illegal drugs, such as heroin and crack cocaine, and they committed acts of violence, including shootings. FnD members often sold drugs in the Frenchmen Meat Market, a convenience store located at the corner of Frenchmen and North Derbigny Streets. FnD members used intimidation, violence, and threats of violence to maintain the gang's control over turf that extended from Elysian Fields Avenue, North Johnson Street, the I-10 Interstate Highway, St. Anthony Street, and North Claiborne Avenue. In 2012, FnD began feuding with two rival gangs known as the Desolnde Boys and PCB (Prieur and Columbus Boys). The feud resulted in multiple killings and shootings stemming from drugs according to Multi-Agency Gang Unit.

=== 2013 mass shooting and indictment ===
On May 12, 2013, at a second-line Mother's Day celebration, brothers Shawn and Akein Scott opened fire in a crowd striking 20 people. The shooting happened at the intersection of Frenchmen and North Villere streets. The area surrounding the intersection is where the FnD gang is known to sell drugs, according to sources familiar with the group. NOPD confirmed the hit was on FnD's rivals which they spotted in the crowd. Among the 20 shot was Leonard Epps, who suffered multiple gunshot wounds to his upper torso. Epps was confirmed as a member of the rival Deslonde Boys, in which authorities believed he was one of the intended targets. 19 others suffered minor and life-threatening injuries. The two brothers were arrested and charged with 20 counts of attempted second-degree murder. In 2014 nine members were indictment on federal gun and drug charges including the Scott brothers. In 2015, Travis and Akein Scott pled guilty and were sentenced to life plus 10 years. While Shawn and Stanley Scott were each sentenced to 40 years, according to the U.S. Attorney's Office.
