= Manuel Manetta =

American jazz multi-instrumentalist (1889–1969)

Manuel "Fess" Manetta (October 3, 1889 – October 10, 1969) was an American jazz multi-instrumentalist.

== Early life ==
Manetta was born in New Orleans (district of Algiers) on October 3, 1889. He was of African and Italian descent. He came from a family of brass players, and could play at least six instruments capably: violin, guitar, piano, cornet, saxophone, and trombone.

== Later life and career ==
He was able to play two brass instruments at the same time, including very late in his life. He played early in the 20th century with the Eagle Brass Band and the Tuxedo Brass Band, and was a veteran of some of Buddy Bolden's bands.

He played in New Orleans for much of his career, but toured with Kid Ory in 1919 and with the Martels Family Band as a pianist in the 1920s. He played on riverboats with Ed Allen in that decade as well. He continued working up until his death, playing in the bands of Papa Celestin, Arnold Du Pas, Manuel Perez, and others. The final four decades of his life were spent mostly on teaching, but he also recorded in 1957, laying down tracks that were first released on Whorehouse Piano. He died in New Orleans on October 10, 1969.
