= Calliope Projects =

B.W. Cooper Housing Development Calliope Housing Projects
- New Orleans neighborhood
- Nicknames: CP3, Da Calliope
- Location within Louisiana
- Coordinates: 29°57′02″N 90°05′32″W
- Country: United States
- State: Louisiana
- City: New Orleans
- Police District: District 6, Central City

Area
  - Total: 0.30 sq mi (0.78 km^{2})
  - Land: 0.30 sq mi (0.78 km^{2})
  - Water: 0.00 sq mi (0 km^{2})
- Elevation: 0 ft (0 m)

Population (1993)
  - Total: 1,100
  - Density: 3,700/sq mi (1,400/km^{2})
- Time zone: UTC−6 (CST)
  - Summer (DST): UTC−5 (CDT)
- Area code: 504

The B. W. Cooper Public Housing Development, also known as The Calliope Projects, was a neighborhood of the city of New Orleans and one of the housing projects of New Orleans. This project of New Orleans gained notoriety for its extremely high violent crime rate. It was demolished in 2014 and replaced with newer, mixed-income apartment buildings.

== History ==
Officially called the B. W. Cooper apartments, the Calliope Projects was one of the Housing Projects of New Orleans located in Central City, New Orleans. There were 1,546 units on 56 acres (230,000 m^{2}) of land (or 24 city blocks.) The project was built between 1939 and 1941. The original boundaries were South Dorgenois, Erato, Calliope (now Earhart Boulevard) and South Prieur Streets. In 1941, rents ran from $8.25 a month for a one bedroom apartment to $22.00 a month for a three bedroom. Until the projects were built, the buildings in the neighborhood were one- or two-story wooden shot-gun structures for the most part. The projects were sturdily made of brick with iron grill trimmings and manicured lawns. The floor plans of the project apartments allowed for more privacy for bedrooms than the traditional neighborhood residences.

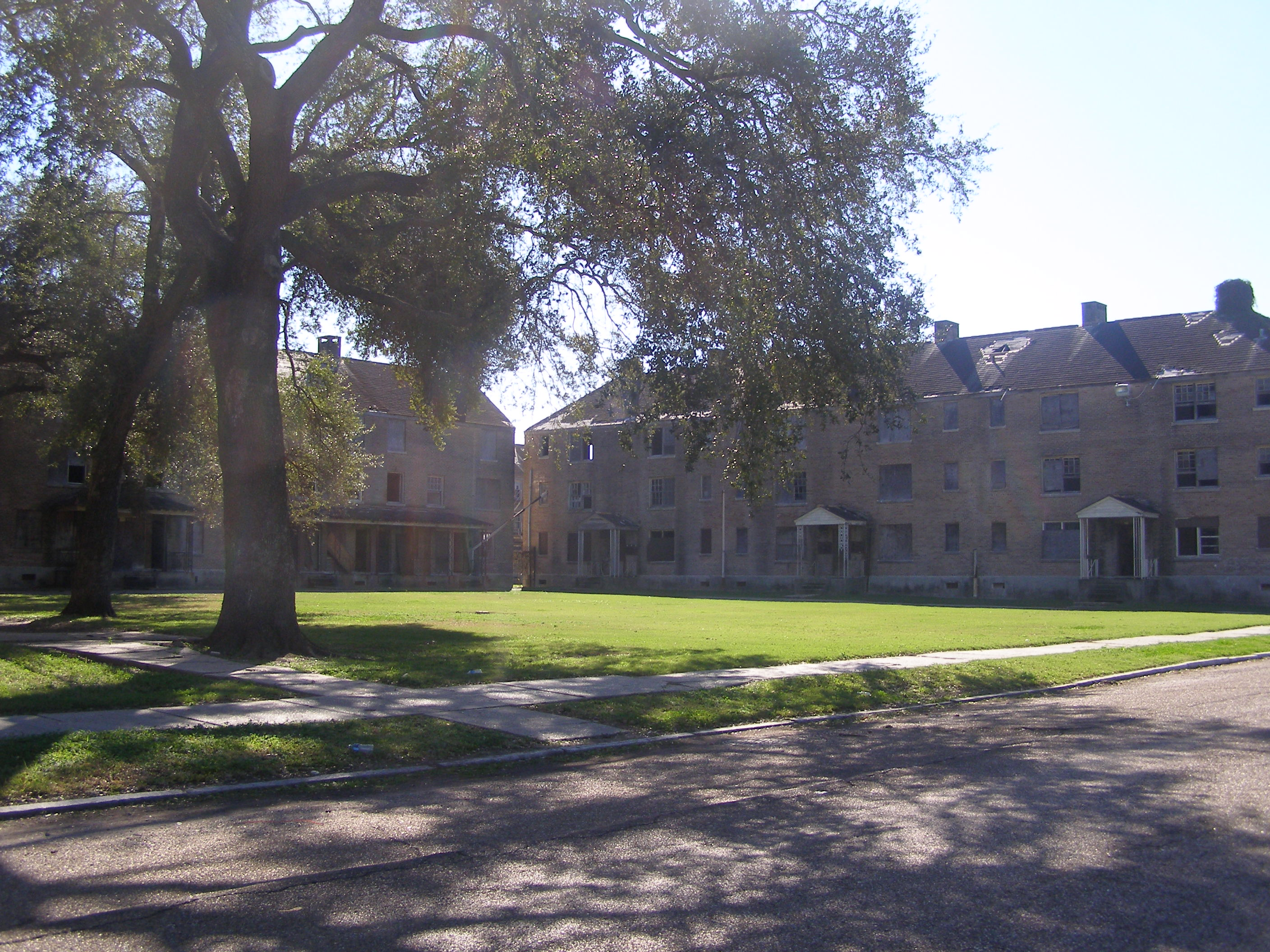
This picture shows the B. W. Cooper apartments known as the Calliope Project. This picture shows what the building looked like before Hurricane Katrina. This building usually has 1 to 3 bedroom apartments.

During the Calliope's early days, it was considered a means for working-class families to live comfortably, while saving up the funds to purchase their own homes. St. Monica's Catholic Church and School were considered anchors of the neighborhood, along with the local public schools like Booker T. Washington High School. Along with a steady stream of outstanding musicians, the neighborhood produced educators, including a Superintendent of Orleans Parish Schools, and politicians, who served city and state government. There were 690 apartments in the original development. In 1949, a gymnasium was added at Broad and Calliope Streets. In 1954, a twelve block expansion added 860 new units. The expansion pushed the western boundary of the Calliope back two blocks from Erato Street to Melpomene Avenue (now Martin Luther King, Jr. Boulevard). In May 1981, the Calliope was renamed the B.W. Cooper Apartments. Mr. Cooper worked for the Housing Authority of New Orleans for 33 years and served on several civic and social organizations until his death in 1974.

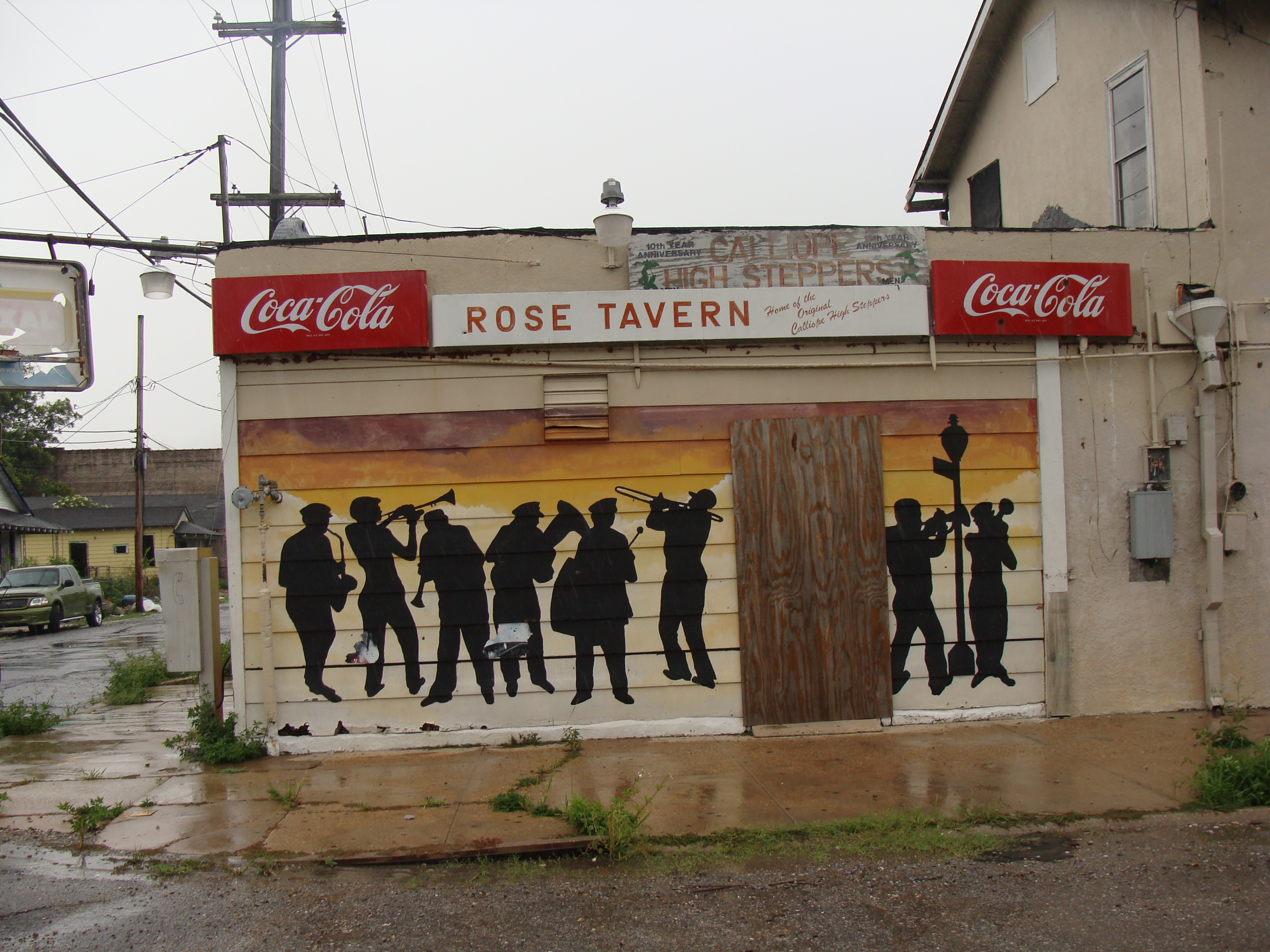
The Rose Tavern where the adults often hung out and relaxed after work.

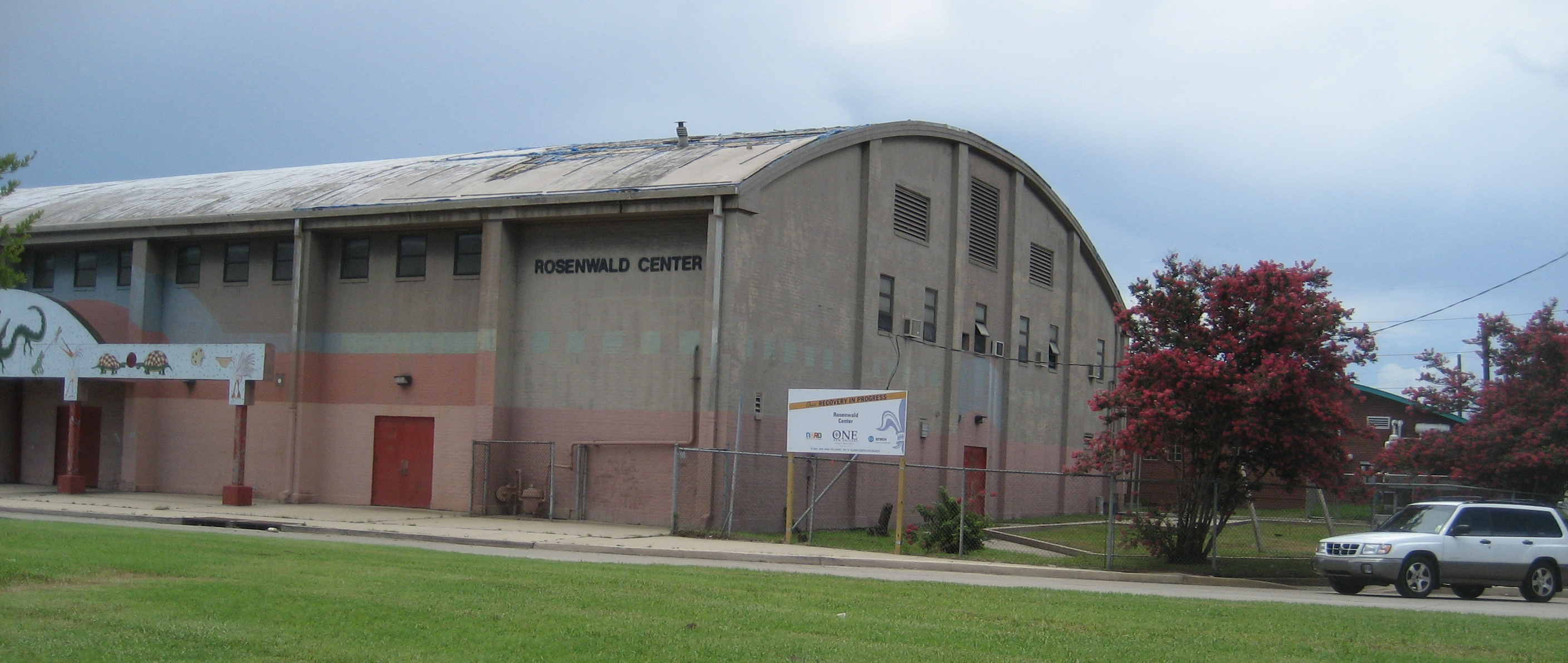
This is where the kids and teenagers hung out. They held talent shows, swimming lessons, tap lessons, etc.

=== Decline ===
Since the early 1980s, rival drug dealing rings have operated in & around the Calliope area, spawning what the law enforcement community in New Orleans called "a seemingly nonstop cycle of retaliatory violence." According to the New Orleans Police Department, the violence escalated in the late 80s, peaking in the early 1990s. After drug kingpin Sam "Sculley" Clay was gunned down in the Calliope in 1987, the drug trade spiraled out of control in a war over the drug trade in that area. From 1993 to 2004, 88 people were killed in the Calliope Projects.

=== Demolition ===
In the wake of Hurricane Katrina, most of Calliope was closed and slated for demolition. In January 2007, a small section of the Calliope was reopened to residents. The development was completely demolished in 2014. A "newer" BW Cooper development was opened in 2012, and was renamed Marrero Commons. This was a collaboration between HUD and a former resident rapper Master P. With 175 units, it was named for Yvonne Marrero, a community leader and former president of the Cooper Resident Management Corporation.

== Geography ==
The Calliope Projects were located at 29°57′02″N 90°05′32″W and have an elevation of 0 feet (0.0 m). This is in the 2nd Ward. According to the United States Census Bureau, the district had a total area of 0.30 square miles (0.8 km^{2}). 0.30 square miles (0.8 km^{2}) of which is land and 0.00 square miles (0.0 km^{2}) (0.0%) of which is water.

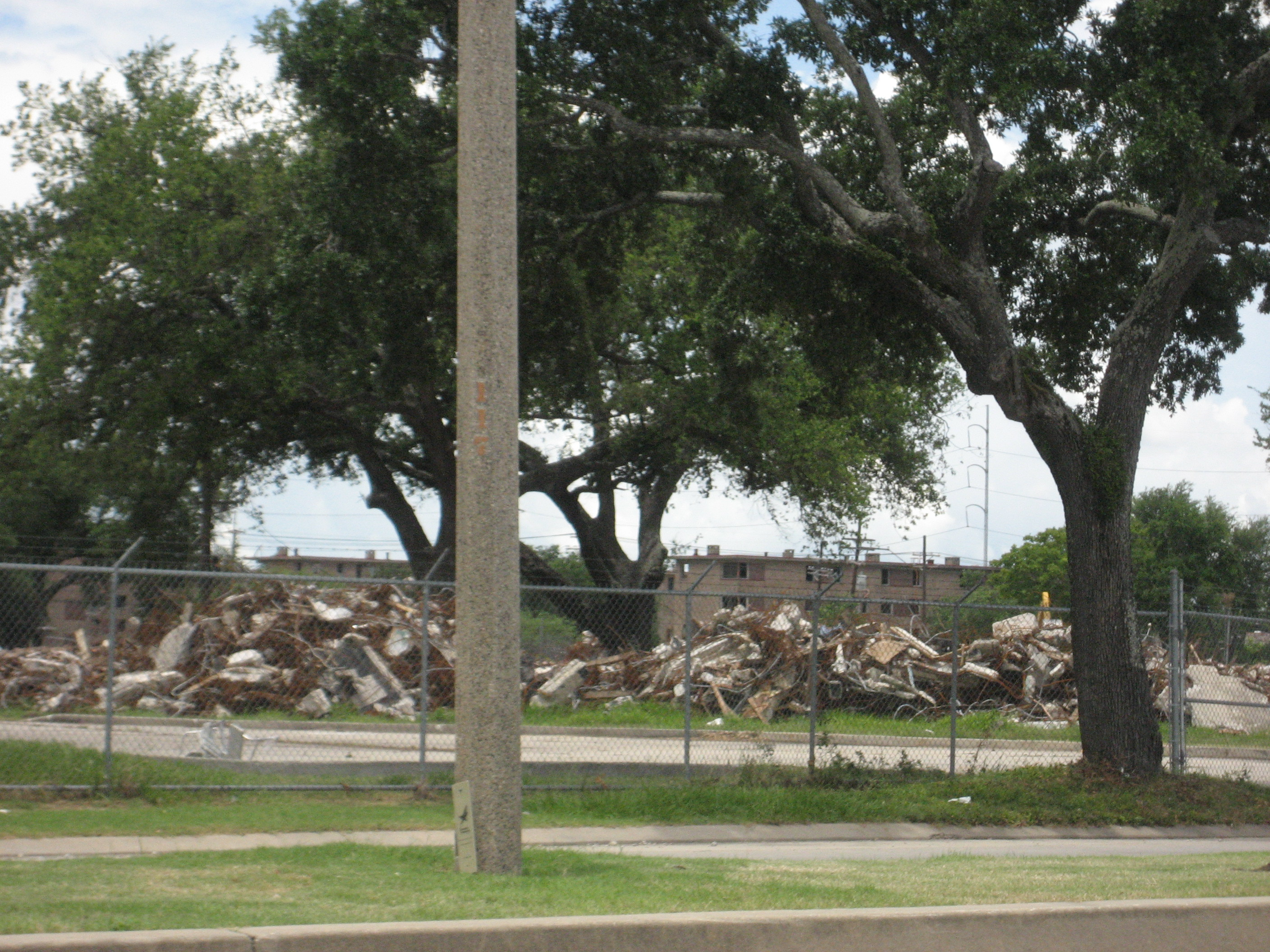
Aftermath of the demolitions.

=== Boundaries ===
The New Orleans City Planning Commission defines the boundaries of the B. W. Cooper neighborhood as: Pontchartrain Expressway, South Claiborne Avenue, Martin Luther King Boulevard and South Broad Street.

== Demographics ==
As of the 2000 census, there were 4,339 people, 1,421 households, and 1,139 families residing in the neighborhood. The population density was 14,463 /mi^{2} (5,424 /km^{2}).

As of the 2010 census, there were 806 people, 318 households, and 181 families residing in the neighborhood.

== Notable residents ==
- C-Murder, rapper
- Lloyd, singer
- Master P, rapper, actor, record executive, and entrepreneur
- Henry Butler (1948–2018), jazz and blues pianist
- Silkk the Shocker, rapper
- Harold Sylvester, actor, writer, producer
- Willie Tee, musician
- The Neville Brothers, family of R&B/funk/soul musicians

== See also ==
- Neighborhoods in New Orleans
- Housing Authority of New Orleans
