= Algiers, New Orleans =

15th Ward of New Orleans

Algiers 15th Ward
- Neighborhood
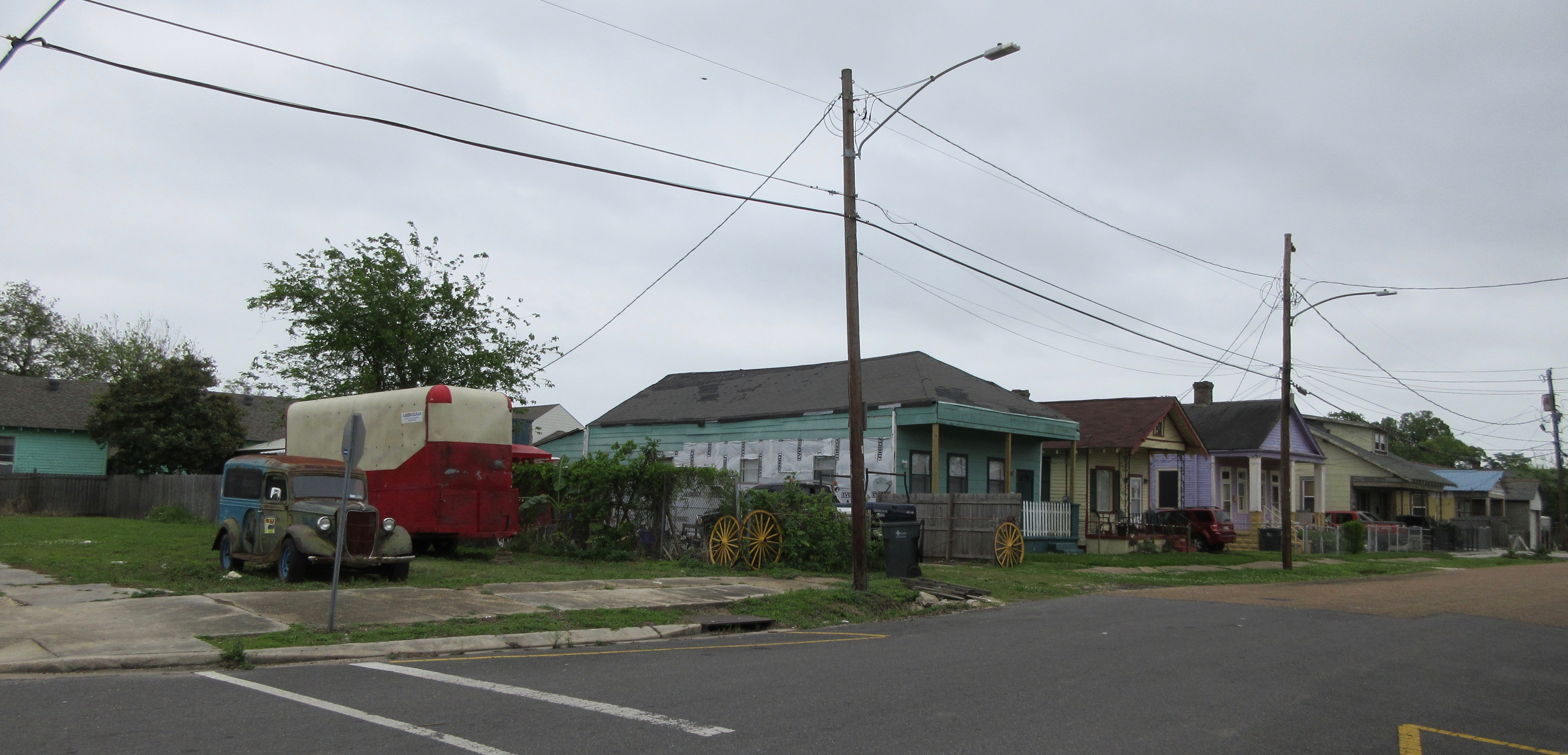
- Shotgun houses in Old Algiers
- Interactive map of Algiers
- Coordinates: 29°55′30″N 90°00′50″W
- Country: United States
- State: Louisiana
- City: New Orleans
- Police District: District 4, Algiers
- Established: 1719

Area
  - Total: 0.62 sq mi (1.6 km^{2})
  - Land: 0.62 sq mi (1.6 km^{2})
  - Water: 0.00 sq mi (0 km^{2})

Population (2010)
  - Total: 25,995
  - Density: 42,000/sq mi (16,000/km^{2})
- Demonyms: Algierene, or Algerine
- Time zone: UTC-6 (CST)
  - Summer (DST): UTC-5 (CDT)
- Area code: 504

Algiers (/ælˈdʒɪərz/) is a historic neighborhood of New Orleans and is the only Orleans Parish community located on the West Bank of the Mississippi River. Algiers is known as the 15th Ward, one of the 17 wards of New Orleans. It was once home to many jazz musicians.

== History ==
=== Early settlement ===
Algiers was established in 1719 as a plantation, not a neighborhood. It was first used as the location for the city's powder magazine, a holding area for the newly arrived enslaved Africans. Decades later, it became a port call for the displaced Cajuns. This region of the city was a French colonial encampment originally managed by Le Page du Pratz on which cabins housed the enslaved. According to geographer Richard Campanella, the area was used as a "warehouse, workshop, lumber mill and a farm in service of the principal colony across the river. Its primary use, however, was as a depository for captive Africans recently arrived from Senegambia as well as the Bight of Benin and Congo regions. Before then it was known as the Company Plantation, the site in the 1720s had more than 30 cabins used for the temporary sheltering of slaves until they were sold to colonists, or for their permanent housing if they were owned by the Company itself—as were 154 people at one point, making present-day Algiers Point".

Developed as a town by Barthelemy Duverjé, Algiers expanded due mainly to the shipbuilding and repair industries of the dry docks and the extensive railroad yards. A large part of the town surrounding the Courthouse was destroyed by fire in 1895.

In 1870, Algiers was annexed to the city as the 15th Ward, an arrangement which has remained despite repeated discussions of secession. Until the latter 1930s, rail yards housed large amounts of freight and rolling stock, which was brought back and forth across the Mississippi River by barge. Then, the Huey P. Long Bridge, which included a railway bridge, was built upriver at Bridge City, Louisiana. The largest railroad presence had been the Southern Pacific yard. That location is still known to Algerines as "the SP yard." For decades, it was largely a vacant strip. Portions of the tract were redeveloped for housing in the early 21st century. In the yard's active days, a steam-powered Southern Pacific train ferry brought railroad cars from there across the Mississippi River.

=== 20th century ===
In 1901, the U.S. Navy established a naval station in Algiers. During the early 20th century, Algiers was segregated due to the Jim Crow Laws of the Southern United States. Under Jim Crow, blacks were not allowed to live in Algiers Point, which was tended for whites or Creoles of color who passed as white. Blacks occupied the area downriver from Algiers Point called McDonoghville (locals refer to it as "Over the Hump"). The neighborhood was named after John McDonogh. Before his death in 1850, McDonogh established "Freetown" for formerly enslaved people and other people of color. Freetown was renamed McDonoghville in 1815. When Algiers became a part of Orleans Parish in 1870, it became the largest populated black community on the West bank of the Mississippi River. Many Jazz artists such as Kid Thomas Valentine and Red Allen all grew up in McDonoghville section in Algiers during the 1910s.

Some of the early black neighborhoods included Riverview, Tunisbourg McCLendonville, LeBeoufville, Hendeeville, Oakdale, and Whitney. In 1938, L.B. Landry High School opened as the first all-black school in Algiers. The school was named after Dr. Lord Beaconsfield Landry, who lived in the area and died in 1934. It was also one of the first schools in New Orleans to serve African Americans.

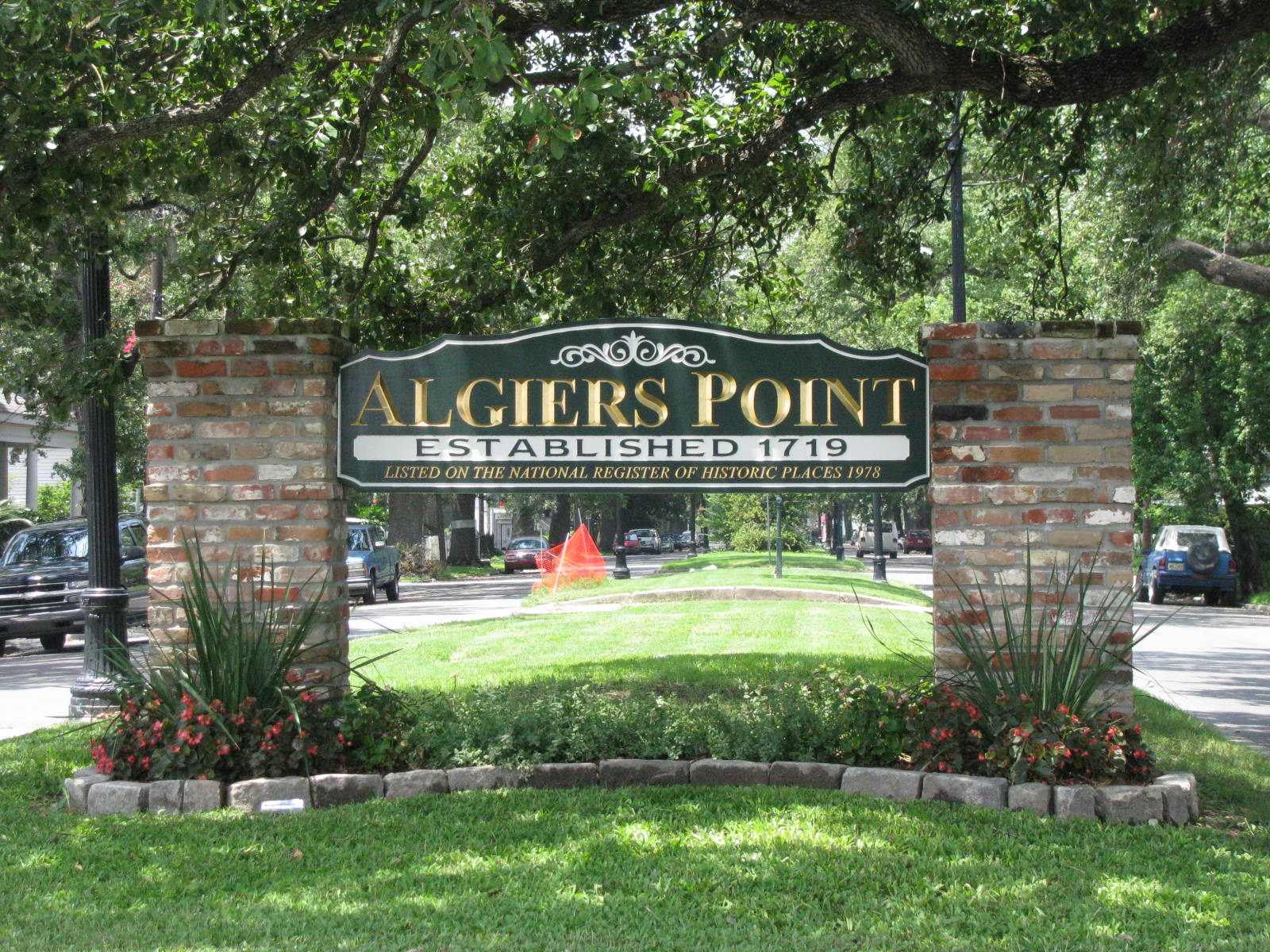
Algiers Point sign

Around the 1930s and early 1940s, several other schools and neighborhoods were built for blacks, including Peter S. Lawton School in Tunisbourg-McCLendonville and Oakdale. Oakdale once stood on the edge of Jefferson Parish and stretched from Whitney Avenue to the Mississippi River. It was destroyed in the late 1950s to make room for the Greater New Orleans Bridge.

Newton Street became the heart of Algiers's black community as it was once filled with ballrooms, and juke joints. The most famous, Greystone Voter's League, became the place for Rhythm & Blues shows and great singers such as Ray Charles, Son House, and B. B. King, who all played there. Other popular hangout spots like Kohlman's Tavern, Ping Pong Club, and Whitney's Ballroom attracted hundreds of people every weekend. Most of the jazz venues in Algiers closed by the 1970s.

Algiers slowly declined after suburban neighborhoods were developed along Gen. Meyer and Gen. De Gaulle. Many white families from across the river began to move into the newly built subdivisions of Algiers during the late 1950s and early 60s. The old plantation homes further down river, known as the “Lower Coast” were sold off and developed into suburbia. These neighborhoods include Aurora, Huntlee Village and Walnut Bend subdivisions. All of which were mostly white middle-class areas. The oil industry provided many jobs and sustained the growth of commerce. In 1970, New Orleans Public Schools opened O. Perry Walker Senior High School. O. Perry Walker was named after former New Orleans Public Schools superintendent Oliver Perry Walker who supported segregated school systems. Before the school opened its doors, many of the white students attended Martin Behrman High School until it was converted into a middle school in 1969.

During the 1970s, Whites had begun to move out of the new section of Behrman Heights after the Housing Authority of New Orleans opened the Christopher Park Homes for low-income black families. The building of a public housing site led to further White flight. However Aurora and Huntlee Village remained white well into the 1990s. The White flight resulted in a major decline, as many businesses left Algiers for more sustainable neighborhoods in the neighboring Jefferson Parish.

== Culture ==
Algiers was home to various jazz pioneers such as Red Allen, Peter Bocage, George Lewis, Papa Celestin, Kid Thomas Valentine and many others. Jazz musicians of the 1920s referred to Algiers as the "Brooklyn of the South", the latter for its proximity to New Orleans as compared to New York and Brooklyn, both separated by a river. Algiers also has a long history of Brass bands. The most notable is the Algiers Brass Band, one of the oldest traditional brass bands still active in the city. There were several social halls, including Algiers Masonic Hall, the Elks Hall, and the Ladies of Hope Benevolent Hall, where early jazz was played. There is some jazz parading in the neighborhood today.

== Demographics ==
Algiers is predominantly African American, with 89.4% of residents identifying as such in the 2000 Census. Algiers' total population pre-Katrina, according to the census, was 28,385 of whom 45.9 were male and 54.1 female. The average age is 29.6, while the population for children under 5 was 2,515. Aged 18 and over was 19,204, while 65 and over were a total of 2,839. Non-Hispanic whites make up 21.8% of the population in Algiers Point, while African Americans make up 73.6%. Native Americans and Alaskan Natives are 0.2% of the population. Hawaiians barely registered, and Latino/as make up 4.3 percent. The average household size is 2.68; the average family size is 3.41. The total number of housing units in Algiers was 12,351; 83.9 per cent were occupied, and 16.1 vacant. 40.6 of those units are owned by homeowners, while 59.4 are rented. Socially speaking, 72.3% are high school graduates, and 14.3% hold at least a bachelor's degree. The married population is 41.2 percent male, and 33.2 are female. Families that are below the poverty level are at 30.3%; individuals below the poverty level are 35.3%.

== Crime ==
Algiers lies within NOPD's 4th District jurisdiction of Orleans Parish. The 4th District violent crime rate in low-income neighborhoods, besides Algiers Point, has struggled with crime since the 1980s during the crack epidemic. The areas drugs affected the most include the notorious Fischer Projects, Whitney, and Behrman Heights neighborhoods.

Between 1987 and 1988, 4th District's violent crime rate doubled with the biggest increase in gun homicides. Algiers made national headlines during 1981 with the "Algiers 7" case, in which seven officers were indicted for killing and torturing black families in revenge for the slaying of NOPD officer Gregory Neupert in 1980.

Throughout the 1990s, homicides were the only violent crime that remained high in the district, reaching 29 in 1995, which was a slight decrease from 1991 rate.

In 2015, the district tallied 25 homicides, 26 in 2020. In 2022, the district was second in homicides behind Eastern New Orleans, with 38 homicides just 1 killing above the previous year.

In 2017, 4th district teamed with the NOPD's street-gang unit to quell gun battles spurred by conflicts between neighborhood groups. The groups were formed of loose associations among people, not stable enough to be considered traditional gangs, and had "some very petty, petty beefs that led to very violent encounters," he said. To reduce crime, law enforcement installed 13 crime surveillance cameras, including ten fixed cameras and three mobile cameras, along with five license-plate readers, including three fixed readers and two mobile readers.

== Neighborhoods ==
Algiers contains many neighborhoods, such as

- Algiers Point
- McDonogh (also known as "Over The Hump")
- Old Aurora (formally known as Aurora Gardens)
- New Aurora
- Lower Algiers (Cutoff, River Park)
- Whitney
- Behrman
- Fischer Housing Development
- Tall Timbers/Brechtel
- Tunisburg-McClendonville
- Oakdale (demolished)

== Education ==
=== Primary and secondary schools ===
Algiers is zoned to schools in the Orleans Parish School Board (OPSB), also known as New Orleans Public Schools (NOPS). The district has its headquarters in the Westbank area of Algiers.

The schools include:

- Martin Behrman Elementary School (K-8)- Algiers Point
- Dwight D. Eisenhower Elementary School (K-8)- Tall Timbers/Brechtel
- William J. Fischer Elementary School (K-8)- Fischer Development
- McDonogh #32 Elementary School (K-8)- McDonogh
- L.B. Landry High School - Old Algiers
- O.P. Walker High School - Old Algiers

The InspireNola Charter Schools operate

- Edna Karr High School- Old Aurora
- Alice M. Harte Elementary School (K-8)- Old Aurora

Crescent City Schools include

- Harriet Tubman Charter Elementary School
- Paul B Habans Elementary School

One campus of the International School of Louisiana (ISL) is in Algiers.

== Notable people ==
- Henry "Red" Allen, jazz trumpeter and singer raised at 414 Newton St.
- Joe Blakk, rapper
- Corey Calliet, trainer, actor
- Keenan Lewis, former NFL cornerback
- Peter Bocage, jazz trumpeter and violinist, raised at 425 Brooklyn Ave.
- Gary Carter, Jr., politician
- Papa Celestin, jazz trumpeter, moved to Algiers in 1891.
- Patricia Clarkson, actress
- J. Lawton Collins, World War II general
- Frankie Duson, jazz trombonist
- Alvin Haymond, retired NFL player
- Rich Jackson, former NFL defensive end
- Anthony Johnson, NFL defensive tackle for the New England Patriots
- Cee Pee Johnson, jazz drummer and vocalist
- Freddie Kohlman, jazz drummer raised at 428 Homer St.
- L. B. Landry (1878–1934), physician, and civil rights activist
- George Lewis, jazz clarinetist
- Kendrick Lewis, NFL free safety for the Baltimore Ravens
- Lance Louis, NFL offensive guard for the Indianapolis Colts
- Manuel Manetta, jazz musician raised at 416 Powder St.
- Memphis Minnie, blues singer and guitarist
- Jimmy Palao, jazz musician raised at 900 Verret St.
- Malik Rahim, Black Panther Party member and activist
- James Ray, Denver Nuggets power forward
- Cyril Richardson, NFL guard for the Buffalo Bills
- Virgil Robinson former NFL New Orleans Saints running back
- Lou Sino, jazz trombonist and singer
- Herb Tyler, LSU quarterback
- Kid Thomas Valentine, jazz trumpeter and pioneer of the Preservation Hall Jazz band raised at 825 Vallette St.
- Mike Wallace, NFL wide receiver for the Baltimore Ravens
- Eddie Bo, singer
- John Lindsay, jazz musician raised at 1019 Verret.
- Joe Thomas, jazz clarinetist
- Lester Young, jazz saxophonist
- Bobby Mitchell, singer
- Herman Riley, jazz saxophonist
- Jim Robinson, jazz trombonist, moved to Algiers in 1911
- Clarence "Frogman" Henry, rhythm and blues singer
- Tom Albert, jazz violinist and trumpeter
- Shawn Wilson, politician
- Edgar Mosely, jazz drummer

== See also ==
- Algiers Point
- Canal Street Ferry
- History of New Orleans
- National Register of Historic Places listings in Orleans Parish, Louisiana
- Neighborhoods in New Orleans
- Wards of New Orleans
