= Tom Albert =

American jazz musician and band leader

- Tom Albert against a doorframe near his home in New Orleans, Louisiana September 25, 1954.

Background information
- Also known as: Kid Albert
- Born: Thomas Albert; December 23, 1877; Belle Chasse, Louisiana, U.S.
- Origin: New Orleans, Louisiana
- Died: December 12, 1969 (aged 91)
- Genres: Jazz
- Instruments: Trumpet, violin, guitar
- Years active: 1899 - 1949

Tom "Kid" Albert (December 23, 1877 – December 12, 1969) was a jazz violinist, trumpeter and band leader from New Orleans, Louisiana. He began his musical career in the 1890s working with the band's violinist Johnny Gould, with "Big Eye" Louis Nelson Delisle on clarinet. From 1908 to 1949 he led his own band and also became one of the founding members of the Eureka Brass Band.

== Biography ==
Tom Albert was born on a plantation field in Plaquemines Parish, Louisiana, on December 23, 1877. He later relocated to New Orleans sometime in his early childhood, settling in the Algiers neighborhood. Tom lived in a run-down shack on Saux Lane, an impoverished strip nearby the Naval station. He initially played the guitar before learning how to play the violin. He was taught basic methods for each instrument by Jimmy Palao. Soon after he mastered the cornet and the violin. The first band Albert was in was his own which included Papa Celestin and Manuel Manetta. In 1920, he founded the Eureka Brass Band. During the earlier years, Albert's band played in Algiers with Henry Red Allen Sr. Band. In his late thirties, Albert moved across the river to the French Quarter and reformed his band, branding it ""Kid Albert Band." The band then began performing in several halls around the city, mostly in the Storyville and Treme sections. For a decade, kid Albert Band played alongside jazz pioneers Louis Armstrong, Kid Thomas Valentine and other small brass bands but never recorded. In 1949 Albert retired from the bands and died on December 12, 1969, at the age of 91.
