= 8th Ward of New Orleans =

Coordinates: 29.993°N 90.052°W

Map of ward boundary

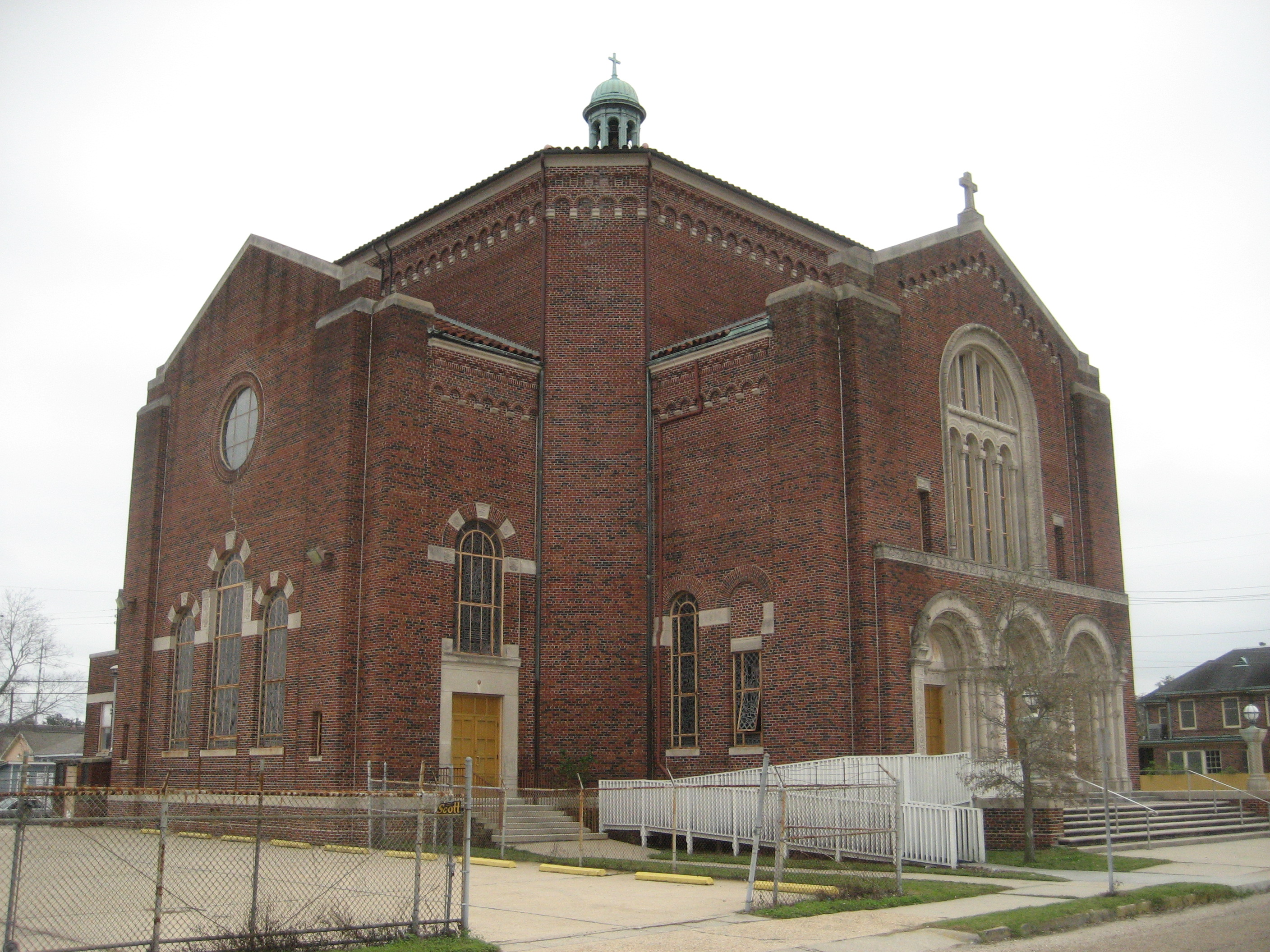
Our Lady Star of the Sea Church in the St. Roch neighborhood is an 8th Ward landmark.

The 8th Ward is a section of New Orleans, Louisiana. It is one of the Downtown wards of New Orleans, with a Creole history.

The 8th Ward is a narrow strip stretching from the Mississippi River on the south to Lake Pontchartrain in the north. East, or "down," is the 9th Ward, the boundary being Franklin Avenue, Almonaster Avenue, then People's Avenue, and a line straight north into the Lake at part of the University of New Orleans campus. On the west, or "upper" side, the boundary is Elysian Fields Avenue, the boundary with the 7th Ward of New Orleans.

== History ==
As in most of New Orleans, the area along natural high ground of the riverfront was developed for urban use first. This is now part of Faubourg Marigny. Other than the narrow high ground of Gentilly Ridge, the majority of the area between Claiborne Avenue and the Lake was little developed until improved drainage was initiated at the start of the 20th century (see: Drainage in New Orleans).

In the 19th century, in the area from Gentilly Ridge to the lake, the People's Avenue Canal formerly stretched along the ward's back boundary, with the Lower Line Protection Levee in back of it, marking the city limit of New Orleans. This section of the canal has been filled in, but a raised railroad line built atop the old levee still gives a distinct dividing line from the neighborhoods of the 9th Ward on the other side.

On the upper edge of the ward, the commercially important Pontchartrain Railroad ran for about 100 years, connecting the Riverfront with Milneburg on the Lakefront.

Neighborhoods in the 8th Ward include the Marigny Rectangle, St. Roch, Gentilly Terrace, Milneburg, Seabrook and Lake Oaks.

Theodore M. Hickey represented the 8th Ward in the Louisiana State Senate from 1955 to 1957 and again from 1963 to 1984.

== Influences ==
Native Americans called the city of New Orleans Balbancha, which translates to "land of many tongues," and they inhabited rich delta lands between the Mississippi River. They also would call the Mississippi River ("Father of Waters") and Okwa-Ta ("Big Water," Lake Pontchartrain). It was during the Spanish colonial era that New Orleans transformed from a village-like environment of wooden houses to a city of sturdier brick buildings with urban infrastructure, largely due to the unpaid labor of enslaved people. Residents in the new American city of New Orleans held tight to their Francophile ways, including language, religion, customs, a complex social strata, and a penchant for the epicurean.

== Neighborhoods ==
Neighborhoods in the 8th ward include Marigny Rectangle, St. Roch, Gentilly Terrace, Milneburg, Seabrook and Lake Oaks. Marigny Rectangle is down the river of the French Quarter, which is to the north-east by compass. This neighborhood is an odd shape as it follows a bend in the Mississippi River. This is often divided by the locals into the Marigny triangle. This triangle runs from Esplanade Avenue to Elysian Fields Avenue. The Gentilly Terrace boundaries are defined by the City Planning Commission consists of Filmore Avenue of the North, People's Avenue to the east, Dahlia Walk and Benefit street to the South. This neighborhood is divided into Gentilly Terrace & Gardens, Edgewood Park and Fairmont Park.
