= Dave "Fat Man" Williams =

American musician (1920–1982)

Background information
- Born: Dave Albert Williams Jr. August 20, 1920; New Orleans, Louisiana
- Died: March 12, 1982 (aged 61) New Orleans
- Genres: Jazz, blues, rhythm and blues
- Occupations: Pianist, singer, songwriter, bandleader
- Instrument: Piano
- Years active: 1930s–1982
- Labels: Ego, New Orleans, GHB, Music Mecca, Ace, CSA, Black Magic, Black Top

Dave Albert Williams Jr. (August 20, 1920 - March 12, 1982) was an American jazz, blues, and rhythm & blues pianist, bandleader, singer, and songwriter. He was the author of "I Ate Up The Apple Tree", a staple of contemporary New Orleans brass bands. His career as a working musician spanned five decades.

== Early life ==
Williams was born in New Orleans, Louisiana on August 20, 1920, to Dave Sr. and Viola (nee Frazier) Williams. His mother, who played piano and organ at the First Free Will Baptist Church, was his first teacher. He was playing the piano by age five. Williams grew up in an extended musical family that included his cousin Preservation Hall drummer Josiah "Cie" Frazier. Frazier commented, "In my family there are many musicians interrelated. My father played guitar, my two brothers played piano. My cousins Simon, Eddie, John, and their father Billy Marrero all played. Also there was my brother Sam who played drums, my two sisters Victorine and Loretta played the piano, and my cousin Dave Williams piano." In his youth Williams studied with Papa Celestin, and by age twelve was playing "nickel parties." He explained, "... you paid a nickel to come in and anything from a penny to a nickel for homemade ice cream, pies, and things like that. It was supposed to be for the children, but grown-up people would buy alcohol and water undercover." Three years later Williams was recruited to play with his second cousins Paul Barnes ("Polo") and Lawrence Marrero at the Cadillac Club in the Ninth Ward. He also worked at the San Jacinto Club and the old Perseverance Hall, social clubs that sponsored dances and jazz performances. Williams' career as a musician was interrupted when he entered the Army in 1941. He served in the 590th Ordnance Ammunition Company in the Pacific theater.

== Education ==
Williams had his first formal musical instruction when he enrolled at the Grunewald School of Music in 1948 under the G.I. Bill. Faculty members included Louis Barbarin, Willie Humphrey, Sr., Clyde Kerr Sr., and Wardell Quezergue. During this time he played at many of New Orleans' legendary nightclubs including Club Desire, The Hideaway, and the Dew Drop Inn. Williams also often played at affairs for black social organizations. He played in the Freddie Kohlman band, then in bands at many of the music clubs on Bourbon Street beginning in the 1950s and through the early 1980s.

== Career ==
In 1967 New Orleans clarinetist Louis Cottrell Jr. was chosen for a U.S.O. tour to entertain U.S. troops in Vietnam. He took a band with him that included Williams on piano and vocals. Headquartered in Saigon, the band performed twice a day, moving around the country from show to show by helicopter. Williams recalled the junket in an interview with The Hogan Jazz Archive at Tulane University. He noted that the Army helicopters were sometimes co-opted to carry out casualties, "packing up dead people, put 'em in a bag, put you right along with 'em." The tour also included travel to Thailand for two weeks.

By the 1970s Williams was performing with Kid Thomas Valentine's band at Preservation Hall. During the 1970s and early 1980s he traveled frequently to Europe and Japan with jazz bands and as a solo act. Williams toured and performed with the Preservation Hall Jazz Band across the United States in the 1970s and into the 1980s. He appeared nationwide on the National Public Radio broadcasts Folk Festival U.S.A. and Jazz Alive from the New Orleans Jazz and Heritage Festival. He played in Denmark in 1976 with Peter Nissen's New Orleans Band, and led his own Dave Williams' International Jazz Band in Copenhagen in 1981.

Williams appeared as a sideman on recordings from the 1950s through the 1970s, including sessions with Cousin Joe, Captain John Handy, Kid Howard, Little Sonny Jones, and Freddie Kohlman.

He cut four sides under his own name for Specialty Records in 1959, all of which remained unreleased until 1986 when his cover of the Fats Domino/Dave Bartholomew composition "Don't You Hear Me Calling You" appeared on the compilation album, Crescent City Bounce, on Ace Records (U.K.). His first release was "I Would If I Could" b/w "It's Me, O Lord" on Ego, Inc. Records in 1963. These two songs were included on his 1974 LP New Orleans Jazz and Blues "I Ate Up The Apple Tree" by Dave Williams, released on New Orleans Records. The majority of the songs on the album were recorded at Lu and Charlie's jazz club in New Orleans on March 5, 1974, with a band that included Williams on piano and vocals, Clive Wilson on trumpet, Clarence Ford on clarinet and tenor sax, James Prevost on bass, and Chester Jones on drums. Also on the disc were four songs recorded in 1963 featuring Williams on piano and vocals, Ernest Poree on alto sax, Narvin Kimball on string bass, and Lloyd Washington on drums. In 2014 GHB Records released Dave Fat Man Williams- I Ate Up The Apple Tree which adds six additional songs from a 1975 session. A 1981 live set from Femø Island, Denmark featuring Williams, Sammy Rimington and Doc Houlind was released by GBH Records in 1996. Recording sessions with Peter Nissen's New Orleans Band in 1976 from Herlev, Denmark and Dave Williams' International Jazz Band in 1981 from Copenhagen, Denmark have not yet been issued. Williams is featured on piano and vocals on two cuts of Little Sonny Jones New Orleans Rhythm & Blues.

Williams spoke of his unusual approach to songwriting. "I think of the words and music at the same time. They come to me in my sleep and wake me up. I just go to the piano. They're so beautiful sometimes I hates to get up." When asked how his wife felt about these early morning sessions Williams said, "I've got me a good wife; she never complains." Williams' signature song "I Ate Up The Apple Tree" was covered by The Dirty Dozen Brass Band on their first album in 1984. The song was subsequently recorded by Rebirth Brass Band, Original Pin Stripe Brass Band, Dr. John, Kermit Ruffins, New Birth Brass Band, and numerous others.

Among the noted musicians Williams performed with in jazz and R&B settings are Louis Cottrell Jr., Lizzie Miles, Wild Bill Davison, Cousin Joe, Freddie Kohlman, George Lewis, Thomas Jefferson, Paul Barbarin, Louis Barbarin, Kid Howard, Big Joe Turner, Lloyd Price, Kid Thomas Valentine, Bunk Johnson, Harold Battiste, Willie Humphrey, Waldren "Frog" Joseph, Papa Celestin, and Alvin Alcorn. In 1962 he was honored as Grand Marshall with Onward Brass Band.

== Personal life ==
Dave "Fat Man" Williams and his wife Pearl Jones Williams were the parents of six sons and three daughters. Williams was proud that he supported his family working as a musician. "That's all I ever did," he said. Tom Sancton, traditional jazz clarinetist and Andrew W. Mellon Professor in the Humanities at Tulane University, considered Williams a New Orleans music legend. He died at his home in New Orleans on March 12, 1982, and is buried in Holt Cemetery.

== Discography ==
- "I Would If I Could" b/w "It's Me, O Lord" (Ego, 1963)
- "I Ate Up the Apple Tree" b/w "Jukebox Sadie Lee" (New Orleans, 1974)
- "New Orleans Jazz & Blues" b/w "I Ate Up the Apple Tree" (New Orleans, 1974)
- "I Ate Up the Apple Tree" (GHB, 2013)
- Dave "Fat Man" Williams featuring Sammy Rimington and Doc Houlind (GHB, 1996)
- "Fat Man" Williams & Houlind-Rimington International Jazzband Live at Femø (Music Mecca, 1981)
- "Don't You Hear Me Calling You" from Crescent City Bounce (Ace, 1986)
- "She's 'My Desire", "Here I Stand with My Heart in My Hand" from Little Sonny Jones New Orleans Rhythm & Blues (CSA, 1975), (Black Magic, 1993), (retitled Little Sonny Jones New Orleans R&B Gems) (Black Top, 1995)
