= Blanche Thomas =

American musician

- Born: October 5, 1922; New Orleans, Louisiana, U.S.
- Died: April 21, 1977 (aged 54) New Orleans, Louisiana, U.S.
- Genres: Blues, traditional jazz
- Occupation: Singer
- Years active: c.1937-1975
- Labels: Imperial, Pontchartrain, Nobility

Blanche Thomas (October 5, 1922 – April 21, 1977) was an American blues and jazz singer, based in New Orleans.

== Life and career ==
She was born in New Orleans, the daughter of Sam Thomas, a musician who played bass and trumpet in bands featuring Kid Howard and Jim Robinson. Blanche began singing in her mid-teens at the Tick Tock Roof Garden on South Rampart Street, while also working as a waitress. In the 1940s, she sang at USO engagements for Japanese internees in Texas, and also toured with a tent show, Dodison's World Circus. Returning to New Orleans, she continued to sing in clubs with musicians including Louis Cottrell and Joe Robichaux.

In the early 1950s she was a featured vocalist in Dave Bartholomew's band at the Dew Drop Inn. Her first recording, for Imperial Records in 1954, was "You Ain't So Such A Much", written by Thomas (though credited to Bartholomew) and featuring guitarist Ernest McLean and drummer Earl Palmer, but – unusually – with no brass section or saxophone. (The song is not related, except in its identical title, to Cousin Joe's 1946 song.) Blanche Thomas also sang regularly at Leon Prima's 500 Club, and at Sid Davila's Mardi Gras Lounge, and appeared fleetingly in Elvis Presley's 1958 film King Creole.

In 1958, she recorded a version of "This Love of Mine" with a small group led by trumpeter Wallace Davenport, released on his Pontchartrain label. Soon afterwards, at the suggestion of drummer and bandleader Paul Barbarin, she began singing with traditional jazz bands. She also performed regularly in clubs in Chicago in the early 1960s. After returning to New Orleans, around 1964 she recorded the album Am I Blue, with Papa French and his New Orleans Jazz Band, featuring Alvin Alcorn, with arrangements by Waldren Joseph. The album, on which Thomas was credited as "Queen of the Blues", was released on the Nobility label. She also recorded with Barbarin's band in the 1960s, and toured with Barbarin to entertain troops in Vietnam and Cambodia in 1967.

During the 1960s and 1970s, Thomas sang regularly at the Dixieland Hall, Heritage Hall, and other venues in New Orleans. She also performed at the grand opening of the Kennedy Center in Washington, D.C. She featured on two albums, Blanch Thomas Meets The Last Straws in New Orleans (1972) and New Orleans Heritage Hall Jazz Band (1973), and a single, "Bald Headed Beulah". She also sang with the Al Hirt band in St Louis, and in 1974 sang at the Carnegie Hall in New York with Louis Cottrell, Jr's Heritage Hall Jazz Band. She toured Europe with Cottrell in 1974, and appeared at the Grand Parade du Jazz festival in Nice with Cottrell and Barney Bigard. She also toured Europe in 1975, as part of Dick Hyman's New York Repertory Company show, The Musical Life of Louis Armstrong.

She died in New Orleans in 1977 at the age of 54, from cancer.

== Discography ==
=== Albums ===
Year	Title	Record label	Notes
1971	Blanche Thomas Meets the Last Straws in New Orleans	Shalom	Blanche Thomas and The Last Straws

=== Guest appearances and collaborations ===
Year	Title	Artist	Record lable	Notes
1965	Dixieland Hall Presents Blanche Thomas with Papa French and his New Orleans Jazz Band – Am I Blue	Various artists	Nobility	With Papa French, Jeanette Kimball, Alvin Alcorn, Waldren "Frog“ Joseph, Joseph "Cornbread“ Thomas, Frank Fields, Louis Barbarin
1993	The Spirit of New Orleans: The Genius of Dave Bartholomew	Dave Bartholomew	Imperial	Performing artist
2005	Rhythm & Blues: Original Masters	Various artists		Primary artist
2008	Rhythm & Blues, Vol. 7	Various artists		Primary artist
2010	With the New Orleans Creole Jazz Band and Monk Hazel's Band	The Thomas Jefferson International New Orleans Jazz Band		Vocals
2010	Rhythm & Blues	Various artists		Primary artist
2011	Let Me Tell You About the Blues: New Orleans	Various artists		Primary artist
2011	Early Rappers	Various artists		Primary artist
2013	The History of New Orleans Rhythm & Blues, Vol. 3: Jazz, Blues & Creole Roots 1953-55	Various artists		Primary artist
