= Dolly Adams =

American musician

Background information
- Born: Odalie Marie Douroux; January 11, 1904; New Orleans, Louisiana, U.S.
- Died: November 6, 1979 (aged 75) New Orleans, Louisiana, U.S.
- Genres: jazz
- Occupation: Musician
- Instruments: piano, trumpet, drums, bass, and guitar
- Years active: 1913 – 1970s

Odalie Marie Douroux Adams (née Odalie Marie Douroux; January 11, 1904-November 6, 1979), known as Dolly Adams, was an American jazz musician and bandleader in New Orleans for over sixty years.

== Early years ==
Dolly Adams was born Odalie Marie Douroux to Louis and Olivia (Manetta) Douroux in the Algiers neighborhood of New Orleans. Her parents were both from notable Creole musical families of color with Sicilian, French, and African ancestry. Louis Douroux worked as a butcher by day. He was also a trumpet and cornet player with many of the brass bands in the Algiers area, including the well-known Excelsior and Eureka Brass Bands. Olivia was also a skilled musician, adept on piano and violin as well as trumpet and cornet. Her brother Manuel "Fess" Manetta was a multi-instrumentalist and music educator who played solo piano in brothels and with the Original Tuxedo Orchestra in Storyville.. Dolly Adams received her first musical instruction from her mother, father, and Manetta. She was already playing piano at the age of five, and honed her skills on guitar, bass, and drums in the following years.

== Career ==
Dolly Adams became a professional musician playing with one of her brothers at private parties at nine years old. At age thirteen she was hired by her uncle "Fess" to play piano in his band alongside frequently changing bandmates including Louis Armstrong, Joe (later "King") Oliver, and Kid Ory. Manetta had been the band's pianist but he gladly relinquished the chair to Adams. Manetta was then free to play any of the several other instruments at which he was adept. Among the places Adams played with Manetta's band was Lulu White's Mahogany Hall in Storyville. At age fifteen she joined Peter Bocage's Creole Serenaders and stayed with that group for several years until she married. Besides Bocage and Adams the band featured Peter's brothers Henry and Charlie, their father Paul, and Lorenzo Tio Jr., the latter being the scion of another New Orleans musical family. At age seventeen she started her own four-piece band at the Othello Theater on South Rampart Street, playing behind movies and vaudeville acts. Dolly Adams was one of the early professional women musicians in New Orleans according to Danny Barker. He speculated that only a few women became noteworthy as pianists and singers with early New Orleans jazz bands. Playing the music that was begun and nurtured in brass marching bands and marching on the street with heavy brass instruments wasn't considered acceptable behavior for girls. Even when the bands performed indoors and included pianos many mothers wouldn't let their girls join them. Pianist Dolly Adams became much sought-after when pianos became essential to many jazz bands.

In 1922 Adams met and married contractor Placide Adams. She took a sabbatical until 1937 to raise a family, teaching their seven children to play multiple instruments. In the 1930s Adams' uncle Manuel "Fess" Manetta formed a band with her and her brothers Irving and Lawrence that later included three of her sons. Her son Placide Adams Jr. remembered, "Mother was a very talented woman. She could play anything and write anything and was a sight-reader." Dolly Adams was in demand across the city, playing the piano in groups led by Luis "Papa" Tio, Lorenzo Tio Jr. and Alphonse Picou. Adams led the family band in the 1940s and 1950s, continuing to play side jobs with the Bocage brothers, George Lewis, "Creole" George Guesnon, and Papa Celestin. After the death of her brother Irving Douroux she enlisted her sons in a new family band that played at clubs such as the Varsity, Gay Paree, and Moonlight Inn. She led her own group at Preservation and Dixieland Halls. Dolly Adams was one of the first piano players to play at Preservation Hall. Adams was noted for her musical aptitude throughout her career, ably performing traditional jazz, swing, modern jazz, and rock 'n' roll. She was one of the few women musicians, including Jeanette Kimball and Sweet Emma Barrett, whose long careers excelled their early work in Storyville.

== Later years ==
Dolly Adams stayed active in music until the mid-1970s. She died November 6, 1979 following a long illness, and is buried in New Orleans at St. Louis Cemetery No. 3. She was survived by her six sons, including professional musicians Placide, Justin and Gerald, and one daughter.
