= Sam Dutrey =

American jazz clarinetist and saxophonist

Sam Dutrey (March or May 1909 in New Orleans – August 27, 1971) was an American jazz clarinetist and saxophonist.

Dutrey's father (1888–1941) had played clarinet in the Excelsior Brass Band and worked on riverboats with Fate Marable. His uncle was Honore Dutrey. He played with Isaiah Morgan, then with Sidney Desvigne and John Robichaux in the 1930s and 1940s. He toured with Freddie Kohlman in 1947, and played in Japan in 1970. He appears on the 1961 album New Orleans Creole Jazz Band.
