= Sweet Emma Barrett =

American jazz pianist and singer (1897–1983)

- Also known as: Bell Gal
- Born: March 25, 1897; New Orleans, Louisiana, United States
- Died: January 28, 1983 (aged 85) Metairie, Louisiana, United States
- Genres: Jazz, Dixieland
- Occupations: Singer, musician
- Instruments: Vocals, piano
- Years active: 1920s–1983
- Label: Riverside
- Formerly of: Papa Celestin

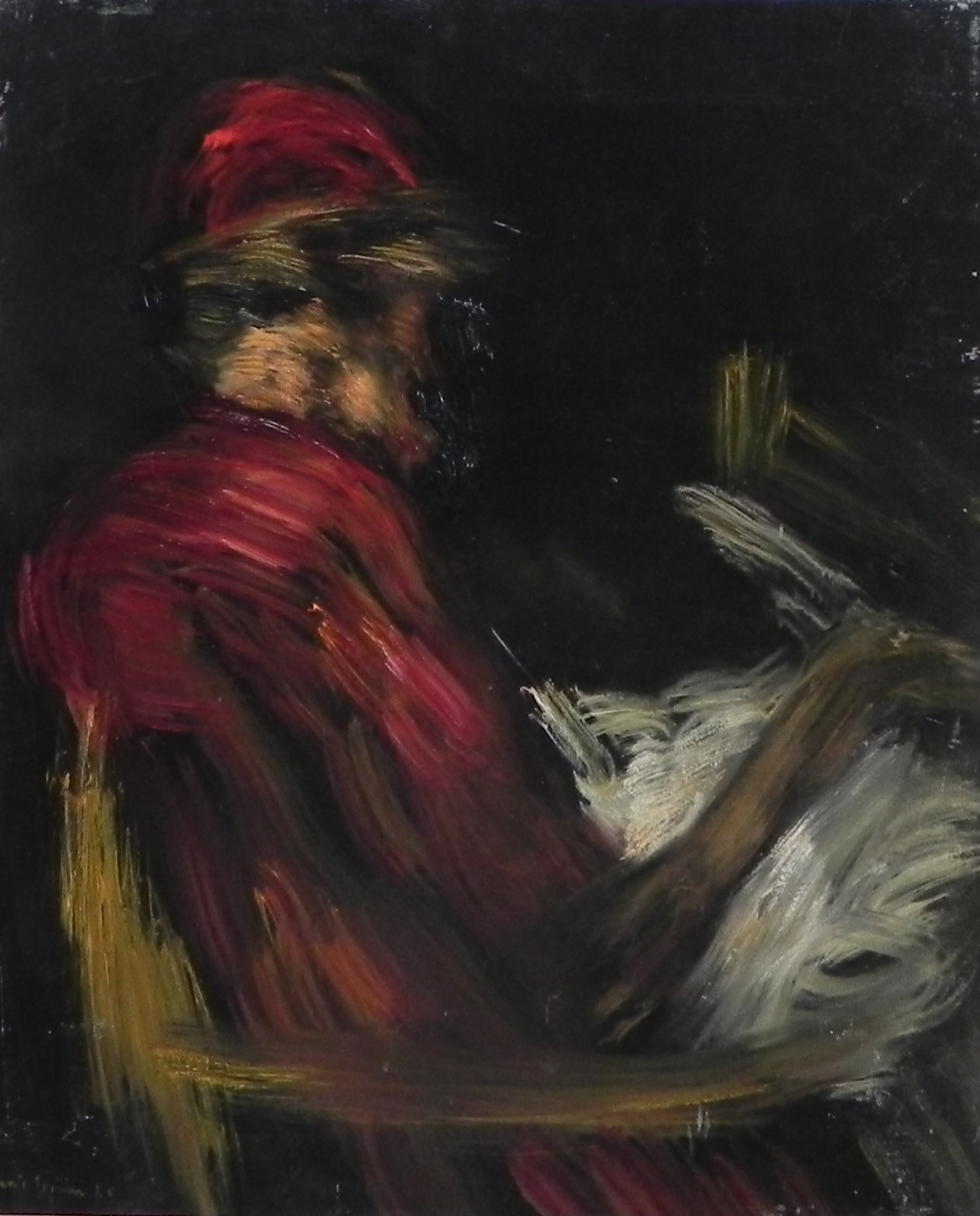
Sweet Emma Barrett

"Sweet Emma" Barrett (March 25, 1897 – January 28, 1983) was an American self-taught jazz pianist and singer who worked with the Original Tuxedo Orchestra between 1923 and 1936, first under Papa Celestin, then William Ridgely. She also worked with Armand Piron, John Robichaux, Sidney Desvigne and the Preservation Hall Jazz Band.

== Biography ==
Born March 25, 1897, in New Orleans, Louisiana. Her father was Capt. William B. Barrett, who she said fought for the North in the Civil War. At age seven, she began to play the piano. In the early 1920s, Barrett joined Oscar Celestin's Original Tuxedo Jazz Orchestra. In 1928, when the Celestin's band split, she began intermittently playing music with Bebe Ridgeley's Tuxedo Jazz Orchestra, which continued for the next 10 years.

In 1947, she accepted a steady job at Happy Landing, a local club in Pecaniere, Louisiana, but it was her recording debut in 1961, with her own album in the Riverside Records New Orleans: The Living Legends series, that brought her recognition. Although most of the songs on the album were instrumentals, others featured vocals by Barrett that the liner notes described as her first recordings as a vocalist.

She was nicknamed "Bell Gal" because she wore a red skull cap and garters with Christmas bells that jingled in time with her music. She was featured on the cover of Glamour magazine, and written about in publications in the United States and Europe. She toured with the Preservation Hall Jazz Band domestically and internationally, including a stint at Disneyland in 1963.

Despite the popular exposure she received at concerts and overseas appearances, Barrett continued to feel most comfortable in her native New Orleans, especially the French Quarter.

In 1963, on her album The Bell Gal and Her Dixieland Boys Music, Barrett sings on four of the eight songs and heads two overlapping groups. She is joined throughout by banjoist Emanuel Sayles, bassist Placide Adams, and drummer Paul Barbarin; and four songs feature trumpeter Alvin Alcorn, trombonist Jim Robinson and clarinetist Louis Cottrell Jr; the remaining four numbers have trumpeter Don Albert, trombonist Frog Joseph and clarinetist Raymond Burke. Overall, this set gives listeners a good sampling of the sound of New Orleans jazz circa 1963, and is one of the few recordings of Barrett mostly without the regular members of what would become the Preservation Hall Jazz Band (Robinson and Sayles excepted). The ensemble-oriented renditions of numbers such as "Big Butter and Egg Man", "Bogalusa Strut" and "Take Me Out to the Ball Game" are rendered with fun and joy.

The Preservation Hall Jazz Band made a brief appearance in the 1965 film The Cincinnati Kid, which featured Barrett as vocalist and pianist for the band and included a close-up of her.

In 1967, she suffered a stroke that paralyzed her left side, but she continued to work, occasionally recording. She played music until her death in 1983 at age 85. She died at Metairie's Bonnabel Hospital. She was funeralized at St. Raymond Catholic Church in New Orleans.

== Discography ==
| Year | Title | Genre | Label |
|---|---|---|---|
| 1968 | Sweet Emma Barrett And Her Original Tuxedo Jazz Band At Dixieland Hall | Jazz | Riverside |
| 1964 | Sweet Emma Barrett and Her Preservation Hall Jazz Band | Jazz | Preservation Hall |
| 1963 | Sweet Emma Barrett and Her New Orleans Music | Jazz | Southland |
| 1961 | The Bell Gal and Her Dixieland Boys | Jazz | Riverside |
| 1960 | Sweet Emma | Jazz | Riverside |
| 1970 | Sweet Emma Barrett with Papa French | Jazz | |

== See also ==
- Preservation Hall Jazz Band
- Women in jazz
