= Narvin Kimball =

American jazz musician

Narvin Kimball (March 2, 1909 - March 17, 2006) was a jazz musician who played 4-string banjo and string bass and was also known for his fine singing voice.

The left-handed virtuoso banjo player was born in New Orleans, Louisiana, the son of well-regarded string bass player Henry Kimball. He was playing music professionally by the mid-1920s with such groups as the bands of Fate Marable and Papa Celestin. He married a fellow member of Celestin's Tuxedo Jazz Band, pianist Jeanette Kimball (née Salvant).

In the 1930s during the Great Depression Kimball switched to string bass to play in swing bands such as Sidney Desvigne's, but music did not provide enough money; he got a day job as a mailman. He continued playing music in the evening, leading his band called "Narvin Kimball's Gentlemen of Jazz".

After World War II he formed a singing group called "The Four Tones" with Fred Minor, Alvin Alcorn, and Louis Barbarin that enjoyed some local success.

Around 1960 with the revival of interest in traditional jazz, Kimball was able to return to playing the banjo professionally again. He played regularly at such French Quarter venues as Preservation Hall and Dixieland Hall, at the latter often leading a band under his own name. However, he kept his day job as a postman until his retirement in 1973; until then he only took brief tours outside the city while on vacation from his postal job. After this date, he toured the United States and Europe extensively with the Preservation Hall Jazz Band. His singing "Georgia on My Mind" was a reliable show stopper. He was the oldest member of the band at his retirement in 1999 at age 90.

When Hurricane Katrina was threatening New Orleans, in 2005, Preservation Hall leader Ben Jaffe made a point to make sure Kimball and his wife were evacuated to Baton Rouge. He died in exile with relatives in South Carolina.
