= Cag Cagnolatti =

American jazz trumpeter

- Born: Ernie Joseph Cagnolatti; April 2, 1911; Madisonville, Louisiana, United States
- Died: April 7, 1983 (aged 72) New Orleans, Louisiana, United States
- Genres: Jazz
- Occupation: Trumpeter
- Instrument: Trumpet
- Years active: 1929-1980
- Formerly of: Herbert Leary, Sidney Desvigne, Papa Celestin, George Williams, Alphonse Picou, Paul Barbarin, Jim Robinson, Onward Brass Band

Ernie Joseph "Cag" Cagnolatti (April 2, 1911, Madisonville, Louisiana – April 7, 1983, New Orleans) was an American jazz trumpeter.

== Biography ==
He was one of six children born to Leonce "Leon" and Anna Shelby Cagnolatti. An excerpt from a piece written about Cosimo Matassa titled "Roll With It" stated that " Little Cag " shared Italian and African American parentage. He was also raised Catholic.

Cagnolatti began on trumpet around 1929 and played with Herbert Leary from 1933 to 1942, as well as off and on with Sidney Desvigne and Papa Celestin. Cagnolatti was a recurring member of many of the major New Orleans brass bands; he worked in the bands of George Williams in the 1940s and 1950s, and with Alphonse Picou in the early 1950s. He recorded with Paul Barbarin repeatedly over the course of the 1950s and 1960s. He and Jim Robinson collaborated in the early 1960s, and he also recorded with Harold Dejan in 1962 and with the Onward Brass Band in 1968. From 1974 to 1980 Cagnolatti was a mainstay at Preservation Hall.

He suffered a stroke in 1980 and did not play afterwards.
