= Papa Celestin's Golden Wedding =

Studio album by Oscar "Papa" Celestin and his New Orleans Band
- Released: 1955
- Recorded: New Orleans
- Genre: Traditional jazz
- Label: Southland Records
- Producer: Joe Mares

Professional ratings
Review scores
Source	Rating
AllMusic	4.5/5 stars

Papa Celestin's Golden Wedding is a studio album released by Papa Celestin and His New Orleans Band in 1955 on a Southland Records 10-inch LP record S- LP 206. The album was released posthumously, consisting of the last recordings made by Celestin, who died on December 15, 1954.

== Background ==
The recording sessions on this album were arranged by Southland Records' owner, Joe Mares. Mares had wanted to record Celestin, and knew that the jazz and New Orleans musician was in failing health. Needing enough material to fill an album, at least a 10-inch one, he arranged to have the songs recorded at extra length each, instead of the three-minute limit that was standard at the time. The liner notes put a spin on this, citing Mares' desire to record the songs in their "full and complete versions." However, Mares did not know if he would be able to book Celestin for another session, a fear that proved to be well founded. Needing an album that would sell well, the songs selected were highly associated with Celestin. Two of these are standards played by almost every Dixieland outfit in existence ("Down by the Riverside", "When the Saints Go Marching In"), but the other two were less well-known ("Marie La Veau", "Oh Didn't He Ramble"). The latter song is often wrongly attributed to W. C. Handy, but the correct attribution is 'Will Handy', a pseudonym for Bob Cole.

== Reception ==
AllMusic noted that this album is a celebration of Celestin the personality, so the vocals are prominent. The reviewer cites the performances as "authoritative and spirited" and a "precious example of early New Orleans jazz". However, it notes that the tracks are hampered by the forced extension of time.

== Personnel ==
- Papa Celestin - trumpet, vocals
- Edward Pierson – trombone, vocals
- Adolphe Alexander – alto sax
- Joseph Thomas - clarinet
- Sidney Brown – bass
- Jeanette Kimball – piano
- Albert French – banjo
- Louis Barbarin – drums

== Track listing ==
1. "Down by the River Side" (Joe Mares)
2. "Saints Come Marching In" (no credit)
3. "Marie La Veau" (Robert L. Gurley)
4. "Oh Didn't He Ramble" (Handy)
