= Al Morgan (bassist) =

American jazz double-bassist (1908–1974)

Albert Morgan (August 19, 1908 in New Orleans – April 14, 1974 in Los Angeles) was an American jazz double-bassist, who played with Cab Calloway and Fats Waller, among others. He also appeared in films such as The Gene Krupa Story, and played on records supporting the likes of Jack Teagarden and T-Bone Walker.

== Biography ==
Morgan came from a musical family; Sam Morgan and Isaiah Morgan were both bandleaders and trumpeters, and Andrew Morgan was a jazz reedist. Morgan started on clarinet, then learned baritone sax, tuba, and bass. He took lessons with Simon Marrero around 1919, then played with brother Isaiah. He relocated briefly to Pensacola, Florida, and played with Mack Thomas and Lee Collins before returning to New Orleans to play on riverboats with Fate Marable and Sidney Desvigne. He then played with Davey Jones and Cecil Scott and recorded with the Jones & Collins Astoria Hot Eight.

In the early 1930s Morgan played with Otto Hardwick. In 1932 he was part of the recording group the Rhythmakers. He then spent four years with Cab Calloway (1932–36). After leaving Calloway, he settled in California, playing live, on record, and on film. His film appearances include a feature on "Reefer Man" with the Calloway band in International House (1933), Cab Calloway's Hi-De-Ho (1934), with Louis Armstrong in Going Places (1938), and in The Gene Krupa Story (1959).

In the 1930s, Morgan led his own band and played as a sideman with Fats Waller, Les Hite, Zutty Singleton, Louis Jordan, and Sabby Lewis. From the 1950s to the 1970s, Morgan played extensively with Buddy Banks in a duo.

Morgan also appears on record with Chu Berry, Coleman Hawkins, Don Byas, Jack Teagarden, Jay McShann, Red Allen, and T-Bone Walker.
