= Onward Brass Band =

Name of two brass bands in New Orleans

The Onward Brass Band was either of two brass bands active in New Orleans for extended periods of time.

== Onward Brass Band (c. 1886–1930) ==
This incarnation of the Onward Brass Band played often in its early history at picnics, festivals, parades, and baseball games. It was under the leadership of Joseph Othello Lainez, a cornetist, by 1887, and quickly became as popular as the longstanding Excelsior Brass Band and Pickwick Brass Band. After 1903, Manuel Perez led the ensemble. The group typically held between 10 and 12 players, with three cornets or trumpets, two trombones, two clarinets, an alto horn, a baritone horn, a tuba, a snare drum, and a bass drum. Perez changed the group's name to the Imperial Brass Band in the middle of the 1920s; it disbanded in 1930. Among the group's members were Isidore Barbarin, George Filhe, Lorenzo Tio, Peter Bocage, George Baquet, and King Oliver.

== Onward Brass Band (1960–2011) ==
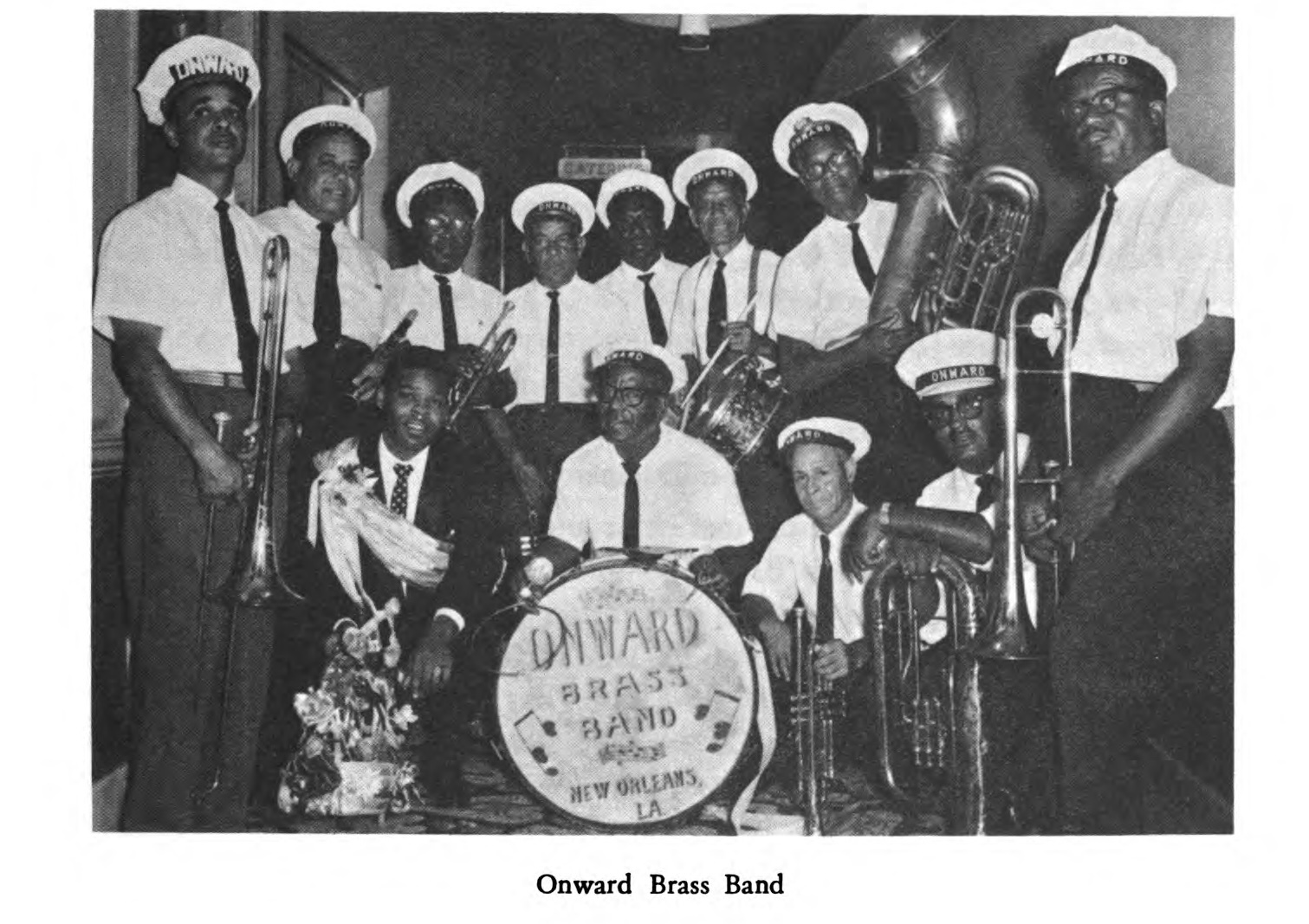
Onward Brass Band performed for the 1965 sesquicentenary of the Battle of New Orleans

In 1960, Paul Barbarin and Louis Cottrell Jr. revived the name Onward Brass Band for a new ensemble patterned after the old group. Barbarin led the group until 1969, after which time Louis Cottrell Jr. took over. Placide Adams took over the band after the death of Louis Cottrell. Jr. in 1978 and was the leader until his death in 2003. The band reorganized in 2005. This band recorded albums in 1965 and 1974 and recently in 2009, and consists of eight to ten players, hewing strictly to traditional brass band music. Its members included Cag Cagnolatti, Kid Howard, Andrew Morgan, Joe Thomas, Louis Barbarin, Alvin Alcorn, Danny Barker, and Freddie Kohlman. Some of the active N.O. musicians who have appeared with Onward include Gerald French, Freddie Lonzo, Marc Braud, Leon "Kid Chocolate" Brown, Tom Fischer, Dwayne Paulin, Shannon Powell, David W. Hansen, Kirk Joseph, Ernie Elie, Dimitri Smith, Louis Ford, and Christian Winther.

== Short history ==
The earliest known written references to the band performing can be found in The Weekly Pelican, the weekly newspaper that published African-American news. On Saturday, February 19, 1887, it noted the Onward Brass Band furnished the music at a banquet held for the L’Avenir Juvenile B.A. The Onward Brass Band gained considerable popularity during the 1880s. By the time of the Spanish–American War in the late 19th century, the ensemble had achieved a reputation as the number one marching band in New Orleans. About 1898 while under the direction of James McNeil, members of the Onward Brass Band enlisted in the Spanish–American War in the “Ninth Immunes Regimental Band”, serving in Cuba. Upon returning to the U.S. in 1899, those members played in the Victory Parade down Fifth Avenue in New York City.

Following the war, cornetist Manuel Perez (a student of Onward founder Sylvester Coustaut) assumed leadership of the band. Onward Brass Band soon came to be regarded in the local music community as the most exciting of the city's early brass bands. Its membership included many New Orleans music legends: in addition to Perez himself, names such as Peter Bocage, Lorenzo Tio Jr., George Baquet, Isidore Barbarin, and even, for a brief time, King Oliver. Unfortunately, this band never recorded. Perez was Onward's leader (on and off) from 1903 until the unit disbanded about 1930. The band seems to have fallen into decline during the Great Depression, and its history for the next three decades is obscure. Around 1960, famed drummer Paul Barbarin, the son of Isidore, decided to reform the band, and pattern it after its great predecessors. Under Paul's leadership, the Onward received new life, and included his younger brother Louis, nephew Danny Barker, Louis Cottrell Jr., Placide Adams and many other top New Orleans jazz musicians. They made two recordings (in 1965 and 1968).

When Barbarin died in 1969, clarinetist Louis Cottrell Jr. (godson of Manny Perez), took over the band's leadership. This group included several members from the preceding band as well as other fine jazz players such as Freddie Kohlman, Teddy Riley, Jack Willis and Waldren “Frog” Joseph. They are heard on two additional recordings (1974 and 1978). Cottrell died in 1978. With that, leadership of the Onward Brass Band passed to snare-drummer Placide Adams who headed the band for the following quarter century, taking over the leadership designated to him by Louis. During that time, the band continued to make yearly appearances at the annual New Orleans Jazz and Heritage Festival (It was pictured on the Miller Beer Jazzfest program in 2001.) Appearances waned due to Placide's ailing health, but occasional private performances continued. At the time of Adams’ death in 2003, plans were being made for the Onward's first recording session in 25 years. Those plans have now come to fruition as a result of the efforts of snare-drummer Kurt Nicewander, a member of the Onward Brass Band for 14 years and entrusted by Adams with the responsibility of ensuring that the Onward's rich heritage be kept alive. Accordingly, he assembled a stellar group of musicians, a few of whom had prior experience with the band, to make this recording.

== Discography ==
- 2009, The Tradition Continues, Onward Brass Band
- 2004, Last Journey Of A Jazzman: Funeral of Lester Santiago, Paul Barbarin and the Onward Brass Band, Nobility, recorded 1965
