= Joe Thomas (clarinetist) =

American jazz musician

- Also known as: Brother Cornbread
- Born: Joseph William Thomas; December 3, 1902; New Orleans, Louisiana, U.S.
- Died: February 18, 1981 (aged 78) New Orleans, Louisiana, U.S.
- Genres: Jazz, Dixieland
- Instruments: Clarinet, vocals

Joseph William "Brother Cornbread" Thomas (December 3, 1902 – February 18, 1981) was an American jazz clarinetist and singer, closely associated with the New Orleans jazz scene.

== Career ==
Thomas's first professional gig was in New Orleans with trombone player Joe Harris in 1923. Soon after that, he worked with Jack Carey, Chris Kelly, and Kid Rena. He recorded with Charles Derbigny in 1941, but the recordings were not publicly released until the 1960s, by which time Thomas had become a figure in the Dixieland revival movement. He led his own ensemble at New Orleans's H&J Tavern for much of the 1940s, then, in 1951, became a sideman for Papa Celestin. He worked with this ensemble for years, including after Papa French and Eddie Pierson had taken over as leader. Other associations in the 1950s and 1960s included work with Freddie Kohlman, Punch Miller, the Olympia Brass Band, and on Swedish television with Sweet Emma Barrett in 1968. In the 1970s he worked with the Legends of Jazz, replacing Joe Darensbourg.
