= Snaer (name) =

Snær is a personification of snow in Norse mythology. Notable people with the name include:

== Given name ==
- Andri Snær Magnason (born 1973), Icelandic writer
- Elliði Snær Viðarsson (born 1998), Icelandic handballer
- Hilmir Snær Guðnason (born 1969), Icelandic actor
- Ísak Snær Þorvaldsson (born 2001), Icelandic footballer
- Sturla Snær Snorrason (born 1994), Icelandic alpine skier
- Styrmir Snær Þrastarson (born 2001), Icelandic basketball player

== Surname ==
- Albert Snaer (1902–1962), American jazz trumpeter
- Louis Snaer (died 1917), American politician from Louisiana
- Michael Snaer (born 1990), American basketball player
