= New Orleans Records =

Record label in New Orleans, Louisiana

- Founded: 1949
- Country of origin: United States
- Location: New Orleans, Louisiana

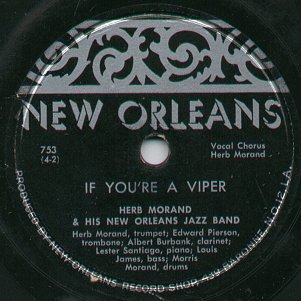
Label of the 1950 New Orleans recording of "If You're a Viper" performed by Herb Morand

New Orleans Records was an American record label based in New Orleans, Louisiana and active from 1949 until the early 1980s. Originally founded by Orin Blackstone in 1949, it was revived by Clive Wilson in 1972. The label specialized in New Orleans jazz.

== History ==
The New Orleans Records label was founded and originally run by the writer and jazz discographer Orin Blackstone (1907–1980). Blackstone though preferred the spelling of his first name to be "Oren". It was based in the book and record shop which Blackstone owned with his brother Harvey at 439 Baronne Street in New Orleans. The shop was also known for its backroom jam sessions where musicians including Raymond Burke and George Girard would play. One of the earliest recordings on the New Orleans label was Johnny Wiggs performing "Bourbon Street Bounce" which had been written by Harvey Blackstone. According to Charles Suhor in Jazz in New Orleans: The Postwar Years, the recording became a surprise hit on local radio. Other New Orleans jazz musicians who recorded for the original New Orleans Records included Armand Hug, and Raymond Burke.

Financial troubles forced the closure of the Blackstone record shop in the early 1950s, and Orin Blackstone eventually moved to Slidell, Louisiana where he became the editor of the Slidell-St. Tammany Times. In 1972, the British jazz trumpeter Clive Wilson, who had settled in New Orleans in 1964, along with Paige Van Vorst, a jazz fan who lived in Chicago, revived the label. Their first release was "Thomas Valentine at Kohlman's Tavern". Under Wilson the label recorded performances by Herb Hall, Frog Joseph, Dave "Fat Man" Williams, and Jeanette Kimball. Among the label's releases in the early 1980s was Kimball's Sophisticated Lady. Wilson and Van Vorst issued 10 LPs from 1972 – 1982, then sold the label to GHB/Jazzology Records in 1992. They published Dave Williams' original songs (French Market Music, BMI) which they retained, and pay royalties to the Williams family.

== Early discography ==
=== Singles ===
- 751 – Johnny Wiggs & His New Orleans Music: "Ultra Canal" / "Two Wing Temple In The Sky" (1949)
- 752 – Johnny Wiggs & His New Orleans Music: "Bourbon Street Bounce"/"Congo Square" (1949)
- 753 – Herb Morand & His New Orleans Jazz Band: "Down In Honky Tonk Town" / "If You're a Viper" (1950)

=== Albums ===
- NOR 7201: Kid Thomas at Kohlman's Tavern
- NOR 7202: Ray Burke's Speakeasy Boys
- NOR 7203: Lee Collins – A Night at the Victory Club
- NOR 7204: Dave "Fat Man" Williams – I Ate Up the Apple Tree
- NOR 7205: Alvin Alcorn and his New Orleans Jazz Band
- NOR 7206: Johnny Wiggs – Congo Square
- NOR 7207: Original Camellia Jazz Band with Special Guest Herb Hall
- NOR 7208: Jeanette Kimball – Sophisticated Lady
- NOR 7209: Don Ewell/Herb Hall Quartet in New Orleans
- NOR 7210: Clive Wilson Plays New Orleans Jazz

== See also ==
- List of record labels
