= Placide Adams =

American jazz musician

Placide Adams Jr. (August 30, 1929 – March 29, 2003) was an American jazz double bassist, who worked prolifically with a wide circle of New Orleans jazz stars over his 50-year career.

He was the son of the New Orleans pianist Dolly Adams, and the brother of New Orleans bassist Jerry Adams, and New Orleans recording session guitarist, Justin Adams, all of whom were descended from a popular New Orleans family band whose roots dated back to the 19th century.

== Career ==
=== Early contributions to American R&B ===
Although he was well-schooled in the Traditional New Orleans Jazz repertoire from an early age, Adams began his professional career in Rhythm & Blues. From 1949 to 1959, Adams performed and toured with such notable R&Bs stars as B. B. King, Chuck Berry, Ruth Brown, Clyde McPhatter and Big Joe Turner.

=== New Orleans jazz renaissance ===
Beginning with the onset of the New Orleans traditional jazz renaissance in 1959–1960, Adams concentrated exclusively on playing and promoting the authentic music of his native city over the ensuing 40 years. He performed frequently with the Preservation Hall Jazz Band, with trumpeter Oscar Papa Celestin, clarinetist Louis Cottrell at Heritage Hall and at the long-running Commander's Palace Jazz Brunch with the Alvin Alcorn band He also gigged with such New Orleans mainstays as trumpeter Al Hirt, vocalist Blanche Thomas, trombonist Waldren "Frog" Joseph, drummer Louis Barbarin, trombonist Louis Nelson, pianist Joe Robichaux, banjoist Emanuel 'Manny' Sayles and pianist Walter Lewis.

=== Historical appearances with George Lewis and Louis Cottrell ===
In 1964, Adams toured Japan with the band of clarinetist George Lewis, and he made 2 recording sessions with Lewis while there. The last of these sessions, recorded in the early morning hours of June 15, 1964, would prove to be Lewis's last recording session but arguably his finest. Although made by exhausted band members who had performed a concert the evening before and had made a string of additional concert appearances on two consecutive days prior to that, the well-recorded session reveals some of the cleanest and most creative lines Lewis ever performed and Adams is heard in solo on one notable track. Although an historical session of superb quality, the recording was not released until 1976, eight years after Lewis's death.

In 1974, Adams performed at Carnegie Hall with Louis Cottrell and The Heritage Hall Jazz Band.

=== The Onward Brass Band ===
Adams also played the bass drum with the Onward Brass Band, that performed for street funerals and in Mardi Gras parades. He assumed the leadership of the band after the death of Louis Cottrell in 1978.

Adams continued performing right up to his death, which occurred three weeks before he was scheduled to appear at the 2003 New Orleans Jazz & Heritage Festival.

== Personal life ==
Adams was Catholic.

== Selected discography ==
With Louis Cottrell and The Heritage Hall Jazz Band

- Live At Carnegie Hall (1974)

With George Lewis

- George Lewis and His New Orleans All-Stars (Recorded 1964, released 1976)

With The Onward Brass Band

- Last Journey Of A Jazzman: Funeral of Lester Santiago, Paul Barbarin and the Onward Brass Band, Nobility, recorded 1965, released 2004.

== Bibliography ==
- Al Rose and Edmund Souchon, New Orleans Jazz: A Family Album. Baton Rouge, Louisiana: The LSU Press, 1967.
- Jazz House. The Last Post: Placide Adams
