= Justin Adams (New Orleans musician) =

American guitarist (1923–1991)

- Justin Adams

Background information
- Born: Justin Lloyd Adams; June 1, 1923; New Orleans, Louisiana, U.S.
- Died: July 2, 1991 (aged 68); New Orleans, Louisiana, U.S.
- Genres: Rhythm and blues, jazz
- Occupation: musician
- Instruments: guitar, banjo
- Years active: c.1950s – c.1990s

Justin Lloyd Adams (June 1, 1923 - July 2, 1991) was an American jazz and rhythm and blues guitarist/banjoist who performed and recorded for more than forty years.

== Biography ==
Justin Adams was born in New Orleans, Louisiana. His parents Placide Adams, Sr. and Dolly Douroux Adams lived in Ward 15, the Algiers neighborhood, on the West Bank of the Mississippi River. Placide Adams, Sr. was a self-employed carpenter. Dolly Adams was the jazz pianist daughter of Louis Douroux, trumpet player with the Eureka and Excelsior Brass Bands, and Olivia Douroux, who also played trumpet, piano, and violin. Olivia's brother was Manuel "Fess" Manetta (1889-1969), a multi- instrumentalist performer and teacher who taught Dolly. He played piano in brothels in Storyville and with the Original Tuxedo Orchestra. Besides performing in the bands of Kid Ory, Manuel Perez, and Oscar "Papa" Celestin, Manetta taught trumpeters Buddie Petit and Henry “Red” Allen, among others. Dolly taught her seven children to play music, with Placide, Jr., Justin, and Gerald playing professionally.

Justin Adams said he became serious about music when he played in bands in the army during World War Two. After his discharge he joined his family's jazz group which consisted of mother Dolly on piano, and brothers Placide, Jr. on drums and Gerald on bass. They often played at West Bank venues such as the Moonlight Inn, the Varsity, and the Gay Paree. Adams joined Tommy Ridgely's band in 1953 and stayed with him until 1964, when he left for Dave Bartholomew's band.

In the late 1940s Dave Bartholomew began organizing and running recording sessions for DeLuxe Records, Imperial Records, and other independent labels at Cosimo Matassa's studio, the premier recording facility in New Orleans. He recruited Justin Adams to join the studio group. The band then consisted of Bartholomew (trumpet), Lee Allen and Alvin "Red" Tyler (saxophones), Ernest McLean, Edgar Blanchard, and Justin Adams (guitars), Ed Frank or Salvador Doucette (piano), Frank Fields, (bass) and Earl Palmer (drums). In September 1955 Adams backed Little Richard on his hit recording "Tutti Frutti", which sold 200,000 copies in the first two weeks after its release and remained on the R&B charts for 22 weeks. He played behind numerous other artists including Fats Domino, Smiley Lewis, Frankie Ford, Shirley and Lee, Bobby Mitchell, Huey "Piano" Smith, Charles Brown, Amos Milburn, Roosevelt Sykes, Clarence "Frogman" Henry, Professor Longhair, The Spiders, Allen Toussaint, Art Neville, Little Sonny Jones, and Ernie K-Doe. He also performed on many of label owner Johnny Vincent's Ace Records sessions.

By the mid-1960s Adams had returned to jazz, appearing with the family band at Preservation Hall and Dixieland Hall. He joined his mother, brother Gerald, and Uncle Fess Manetta to perform at the Creole Spring Fiesta Association Ball in 1968. It was one of his mother's last engagements. Adams played with various musicians including pianist Emile Venett in modern jazz venues around the city. He and trumpeter Wendell Brunious began the first Jazz Brunch at Commander's Palace restaurant in the 1970s. Adams and his family started the tradition of small strolling bands featured at jazz brunches in restaurants around New Orleans.

Justin Adams died of a heart attack on July 2, 1991. In 2012 Preservation Hall guitarist/banjoist Carl LeBlanc recorded a salute to Adams entitled "Justin Case: A Tribute to Justin Adams".
