= Gene Porter =

American jazz musician

Eugene Porter (June 7, 1910 – February 24, 1993) was an American jazz saxophonist and clarinetist.

== Early life ==
Porter was born in Pocahontas, Mississippi on June 7, 1910. He began on cornet, but when his instrument was stolen he picked up saxophone and clarinet (studying the latter under Omer Simeon). He moved to Chicago while still in high school, and left school early to start a career in music.

== Later life and career ==
Porter worked in and around New Orleans as well as on riverboats, with Papa Celestin, Joe Robichaux (1933), and Sidney Desvigne (1935). He was with the Jeter-Pillars Orchestra from 1935 to 1937, then played with Don Redman briefly before returning to Jeter-Pillars until 1942. Following this he worked with Jimmie Lunceford (1942) and Benny Carter (1942–44), working as assistant bandleader under Carter and appearing in several films, including with Fats Waller. He was in the Army in 1944–45, as part of an Army band, then played with Carter again and recorded with Dinah Washington (1945), Charles Mingus (1946), and Lloyd Glenn (1947). After moving to San Diego in 1948, he played with Walter Fuller (1948–60), and led his own ensemble at the Bronze Room in La Mesa, California beginning in 1967.

Porter was named a member of the St. Louis Jazz Hall of Fame in the 1980s. He died in San Diego County, California, on February 24, 1993.

== Discography ==
With Dinah Washington

- Dinah Washington Sings the Blues (Grand Award, 1955)
- Mellow Mama (Delmark, recorded 1945, compiled for release in 1992)
