= Tutti Frutti (song) =

1955 single by Little Richard

Single by Little Richard

from the album Here's Little Richard
- B-side: "I'm Just a Lonely Guy"
- Released: October 1955
- Recorded: September 14, 1955
- Studio: J&M (New Orleans, Louisiana)
- Genre: Rock and roll
- Length: 2:23
- Label: Specialty
- Songwriters: Dorothy LaBostrie, Little Richard
- Producer: Robert Blackwell

Little Richard singles chronology
"Always" (1954)	"Tutti Frutti" (1955)	"Long Tall Sally" (1956)

"Tutti Frutti" (Italian for "all fruits") is a song written by Little Richard and Dorothy LaBostrie, recorded in 1955, which was Richard's first major hit. With its energetic refrain and its hard-driving sound and wild lyrics, it became not only a model for many future Little Richard songs, but also for rock and roll itself.

Its refrain is often transcribed as "A-wop-bop-a-loo-mop-a-lop-bam-boom!" and was a verbal rendition of a drum pattern imagined by Little Richard. The song introduced several of rock music's most characteristic musical features with the preference of a loud volume, powerful vocal style, and distinctive beat and rhythm.

In 2007, an eclectic panel of recording artists ranked "Tutti Frutti" at No. 1 on Mojo's "The Top 100 Records That Changed The World" and hailed the recording as "the sound of the birth of rock and roll". In 2009, the U.S. Library of Congress National Recording Registry added the recording to its registry, saying the "unique vocalizing over the irresistible beat announced a new era in music". In April 2012, Rolling Stone magazine declared the refrain "the most inspired rock lyric ever recorded". It was inducted into the Grammy Hall of Fame in 1998.

== Original recording by Little Richard ==
Although "Little Richard" Penniman had recorded for RCA and Peacock Records since 1951, his records had been relatively undistinguished and did not result in the commercial success for which his producers hoped. In February 1955, he sent a demo tape to Specialty Records, which was heard by Specialty owner Art Rupe. Rupe heard promise in the tapes and arranged a recording session for Little Richard at Cosimo Matassa's J & M Studio in New Orleans in September 1955, with Robert "Bumps" Blackwell as producer and Fats Domino's backing band. The band included Lee Allen and Alvin "Red" Tyler on saxophones, Huey Smith on piano, Frank Fields on double bass, Justin Adams on guitar and Earl Palmer on drums.

As the session wore on, Little Richard became frustrated that his anarchic performance style was not being fully captured on tape. During a lunch break, he started pounding a piano and singing a ribald song that he wrote and composed, and which he had been performing live for a few years. According to some accounts, he first wrote and performed the song while working as a janitor in a bus station. The song that he sang was a piece of music that he "had polished in clubs across the South". Little Richard sang:

A-wop-bop-a-loo-mop a-good-Goddam!
Tutti Frutti, good booty

After this lively performance, Blackwell knew the song was going to be a hit, but recognized that the lyrics, with their "minstrel modes and sexual humor", needed to be revised for lyrical purity.

Blackwell contacted local songwriter Dorothy LaBostrie to revise the lyrics, with Little Richard still playing in his characteristic style. According to Blackwell, LaBostrie "didn't understand melody" but she was definitely a "prolific writer".

The original lyrics, in which "Tutti Frutti" verses contained descriptions of anal sex, were:

Tutti Frutti, good booty
If it don't fit, don't force it
You can grease it, make it easy

These were replaced with:

Tutti Frutti, aw rooty
Tutti Frutti, aw rooty.

"Aw rooty" was a slang expression meaning "All right". According to Charles Connor, Little Richard's drummer, the original lyrics were:

Tutti Frutti, good booty
If it's tight, it's all right
And if it's greasy, it makes it easy

In addition to Penniman and LaBostrie, a third name—Lubin—is credited as co-writer. Some sources considered this a pseudonym used by Specialty label owner Art Rupe to claim royalties on some of his label's songs, but others refer to songwriter Joe Lubin.

As possible evidence that the "sexual song" theory was created later, songwriter LaBostrie was quoted as saying, "Little Richard didn't write none of 'Tutti Frutti'. I'll tell you exactly how I came to write that. I used to live on Galvez Street and my girlfriend and I liked to go down to the drug store and buy ice cream. One day we went in and saw this new flavor, Tutti Frutti. Right away I thought, 'Boy, that's a great idea for a song'. So I kept it in the back of my mind until I got to the studio that day. I also wrote the flip side of 'Tutti Frutti', 'I'm Just A Lonely Guy', and a spiritual, 'Blessed Mother', all in the same day." However, Phil Walden, co-founder of Capricorn Records, said that as a teenager, he had seen Little Richard perform an "off-color" version of "Tutti Frutti" before the song was recorded. LaBostrie was still receiving royalty checks on the average of $5,000 every three to six months from the song in the 1980s.

Blackwell said time constraints prevented the development of a new arrangement, so Little Richard recorded the revised song in three takes, taking about 15 minutes, with the original piano part. The song was recorded on September 14, 1955. Released on Specialty 561, the record entered the Billboard Rhythm and Blues chart at the end of December 1955 and rose to No. 2 early in February 1956. It also reached No. 13 on the Billboard pop chart. In the UK, it only scraped into the top 30 in 1957, as the B-side of "Long Tall Sally". The song, with its twelve-bar blues chord progression, provided the foundation of Little Richard's career. It was seen as a very aggressive song that contained more features of African American vernacular music than any other past recording in this style.

Richard's contract with Peacock had been purchased by Specialty Records owner Art Rupe, who also owned the publishing company that bought Richard's songs. Specialty's deal with Richard was typical of most record companies' dealings with their artists.

=== Impact ===
Combining elements of boogie, gospel and blues, the song introduced several of rock music's most characteristic musical features, including its loud volume, its vocal style emphasizing power, and its distinctive beat and rhythm. The beat has its roots in boogie-woogie, but Richard departed from its shuffle rhythm and introduced a new distinctive rock beat. He reinforced the new rock rhythm with a two-handed approach, playing patterns with his right hand, with the rhythm typically popping out in the piano's high register. The song's new rhythm became the basis for the standard rock beat, which was later consolidated by Chuck Berry.

In 2007, an eclectic panel of recording artists voted "Tutti Frutti" No. 1 on Mojo's "The Top 100 Records That Changed The World," hailing the recording as "the sound of the birth of rock and roll." In 2009, the US Library of Congress National Recording Registry added the recording to its registry, stating that the hit, with its original a cappella introduction, heralded a new era in music. The song was No. 43 on Rolling Stone's list of "The 500 Greatest Songs of All Time". In April 2012, Rolling Stone magazine declared that the song "still has the most inspired rock lyric on record." Bob Dylan writing about the song opined "Little Richard was speaking in tongues across the airwaves long before anyone knew what was happening. He took speaking in tongues right out of the sweaty canvas tent and put it on the mainstream radio, even screamed like a holy preacher — which is what he was."

In June 2026, CBS News included the song in its list of the 250 essential American songs of the past 250 years.

=== The B-side ===
"I'm Just a Lonely Guy," the B-side ballad credited to LaBostrie-Penniman, has rarely appeared on albums or compilations in its original, undubbed mix, as heard on the single. A remix featuring overdubbed female backing vocals appeared on Little Richard's third album, The Fabulous Little Richard.

== Personnel ==
- Little Richard – vocals, piano
- Lee Allen – tenor saxophone
- Alvin "Red" Tyler – baritone saxophone
- Frank Fields – double bass
- Earl Palmer – drums

=== Additional personnel ===
- Justin Adams – guitar

== Certifications ==
Certifications for "Tutti Frutti"
Region	Certification	Certified units/sales
New Zealand (RMNZ)	Gold	15,000^{‡}
United Kingdom (BPI)	Silver	200,000^{‡}
^{‡} Sales+streaming figures based on certification alone.

== Early cover versions ==
The song has been covered by many musicians. After Pat Boone's success with "Ain't That a Shame", his next single was "Tutti Frutti", markedly toned down from the already reworked Blackwell version. Boone's version made No. 12 on the national pop chart, with Little Richard's trailing behind reaching only No. 21 in February 1956. Boone himself admitted that he did not wish to do a cover of "Tutti Frutti" because "it didn't make sense" to him; however, the producers persuaded him into making a different version by claiming that the record would generate attention and money. Bob Dylan said of Boone's cover, "Of all the people who sang 'Tutti Frutti,' Pat Boone was probably the only one who knew what he was singing about."

Little Richard admitted that though Boone "took [his] music", Boone made it more popular due to his high status in the white music industry. Nevertheless, a Washington Post staff writer, Richard Harrington, quoted Richard in an article:

They didn't want me to be in the white guys' way. ... I felt I was pushed into a rhythm and blues corner to keep out of rockers' way, because that's where the money is. When "Tutti Frutti" came out. ... They needed a rock star to block me out of white homes because I was a hero to white kids. The white kids would have Pat Boone upon the dresser and me in the drawer 'cause they liked my version better, but the families didn't want me because of the image that I was projecting.

== Elvis Presley version ==
"Tutti Frutti"
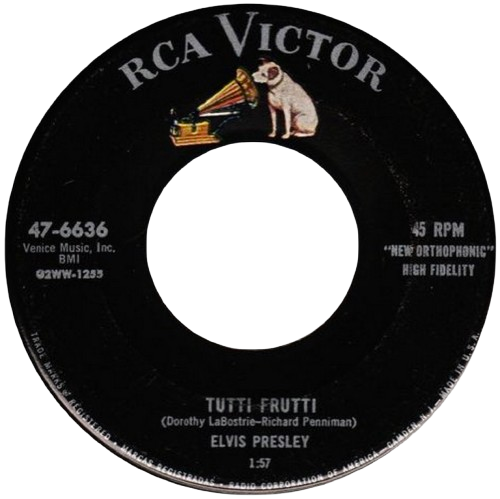
- B-side label of US single

Single by Elvis Presley

from the album Elvis Presley
- A-side: "Blue Suede Shoes"
- Released: August 31, 1956
- Recorded: January 30, 1956
- Studio: RCA, New York City
- Genre: Rock and roll, rockabilly
- Length: 1:57
- Label: RCA Victor
- Songwriters: Little Richard, Dorothy LaBostrie
- Producer: Steve Sholes

Elvis Presley singles chronology
"Shake, Rattle and Roll" (1956)	"Tutti Frutti" (1956)	"I Got a Woman" (1956)

Elvis Presley recorded the song and it was included in his first RCA album Elvis Presley, released March 23, 1956. Presley's version uses "A-wop-bop-a-loo-bop-a-lop-bam-boom!" for every verse, finishing the phrase with "bam-boom" instead of "bom-bom". Presley's cut of "Tutti Frutti" was also released as part of a four-track EP (RCA EPA-747) and as the b-side of "Blue Suede Shoes" (RCA 47–6636) which reached #20 on the Billboard chart.

== The Beatles versions ==
According to author Mark Lewisohn in The Complete Beatles Chronicles (p. 365) The Beatles performed "Tutti Frutti" live from at least 1960 through 1962 (in Hamburg, Liverpool and elsewhere). Reportedly the lead vocal was always by Paul McCartney, but it is unknown whether their version was actually based on the one by Elvis or that of Little Richard. No recorded version is known to have survived. However, according to author Allen J. Weiner in The Beatles – The Ultimate Recording Guide (p. 225) during the massive Get Back sessions a version of "Tutti Frutti" was recorded. A few months later George Harrison played on a live version which was recorded in Copenhagen with Delaney and Bonnie and Eric Clapton which came out on an unauthorized release, though a legitimate version was also recorded in concert in England (and released in 1970). In 1972 Ringo Starr drummed on, and produced a brief version with Elton John on piano and T. Rex singer Marc Bolan on lead vocal. Lastly, in the 1990s Paul McCartney did a (professionally recorded) soundcheck singing "Tutti Frutti" but not like Elvis or Little Richard but instead like an extremely laid-back Pat Boone of 1956 (Boone's real version was more lively). The McCartney version came out on an unauthorized release, Soundcheck Songs Vol. 1.

== Johnny Hallyday versions ==
"Tutti Frutti"

Single by Johnny Hallyday

from the album Johnny Hallyday et ses fans au festival de rock 'n' roll
- B-side: "Depuis qu'ma môme (live)"
- Released: April 14, 1961
- Recorded: February 24, 1961
- Venue: Dôme de Paris
- Genre: Rock and roll
- Length: 2:54
- Label: Disques Vogue
- Songwriters: Dorothy LaBostrie, Little Richard
- Producer: Lee Hallyday

Johnny Hallyday singles chronology
"24,000 baisers" (1961)	"Tutti Frutti" (1961)	"À New Orleans" (1961)

In 1961, French singer Johnny Hallyday (who is considered the French version of Presley) first covered the song live during a set at the Premier festival international de rock (meaning "First international rock festival"), which was held at the Dôme de Paris on February 24 that year, which is credited for having a great impact and truly launching rock and roll in France, which Hallyday performed at. Two months later, Hallyday's gig at the festival would be released by Disques Vogue on April 5 as "Johnny Hallyday et ses fans au festival de rock 'n' roll" ("Johnny Hallyday and his fans at the rock 'n' roll festival"), being Hallyday's first live album, and Hallyday's live rendition of "Tutti Frutti" would be released as the album's only single nine days later, being Hallyday's first single to feature both an English-language song and Foreign-language song on the A-side as well as his first live single. Hallyday's 1961 live version peaked at Number 8 on the French charts and Number 13 on the French Belgian charts. 14 years later, Hallyday would later record a studio version for his 1975 studio album "Rock à Memphis" but was not released as a single nor charted.

=== Personnel ===
- Jean-Pierre Martin: guitar
- Alf Masselier: double bass
- Teddy Martin: drums
- Georges Grenu: saxophone

=== Charts ===
Chart (1961)	Peak position
France (SNEP)	8
Belgium (Ultratop 50 Wallonia)	13

== Later recordings ==
Little Richard re-recorded the song in 1964 for Vee Jay Records' Little Richard's Greatest Hits and again in 1976 for a K-tel compilation titled Little Richard Live. Queen played the song live in their Magic Tour in 1986, and it appears on their live recordings Live at Wembley '86 and Hungarian Rhapsody. The song made its way into the 1987 animated movie The Brave Little Toaster in a scene where the main characters clean the cottage while Radio (Jon Lovitz) plays the song. The song is featured in the 1984 action comedy film Top Secret!, starring Val Kilmer, who also did the vocals.
