= Isidore Barbarin =

American jazz cornet and alto horn player (1871–1960)

Isidore Jean "John" Barbarin (September 24, 1871 – June 12, 1960) was an American jazz cornet and alto horn player. He was a mainstay of the New Orleans jazz scene in the decades around the turn of the 20th century.

Barbarin was born and died in New Orleans. He began learning cornet at age 14, then played in various New Orleans brass bands, such as the Onward Brass Band, the Excelsior Brass Band, and Papa Celestin's Tuxedo Brass Band. He did not make it on to record until 1945, when he recorded with Bunk Johnson; in 1946 he recorded with the Original Zenith Brass Band.

== Personal life ==
Isidore's sons, Paul and Louis, became noted musicians in their own right. His two other sons both became professional musicians as well; Lucien Barbarin (1905–1955) was a drummer, and William Barbarin (1907–1973) played cornet. His grandson, Danny Barker, to daughter Rose (1891–1954), is also a musician.

Barbarin was Catholic.

== General references ==
- Isidore Barbarin at Allmusic
- Russell/Kernfeld, "Isidore Barbarin". Grove Jazz online.
