= Andrew Morgan (musician) =

American jazz musician (died 1972)

- Born: Pensacola, Florida, U.S.
- Died: September 19, 1972; New Orleans, Louisiana, U.S.
- Genres: Jazz
- Instruments: Clarinet, saxophone

Andrew Morgan (died September 19, 1972) was an American jazz clarinetist and saxophonist.

== Early life ==
Morgan was born in Pensacola, Florida. He played clarinet with the Imperial Band in the mid-1920s and then joined his brother Isaiah Morgan's band in 1925. Sam Morgan led this ensemble for its recordings in 1927.

== Career ==
Morgan played in the late-1920s and 1930s with Kid Howard, Kid Rena, and Kid Thomas Valentine. He and Isaiah played together again in Biloxi, Mississippi in the 1940s, then Andrew moved back to New Orleans to play with Alphonse Picou, Kid Rena again, Herb Morand (1946–52), and Kid Clayton (from 1952). He played with the Young Tuxedo Brass Band from 1958 and led the group after 1964. He played with Percy Humphrey (1953), Sweet Emma Barrett (1960), Kid Howard again (1962), Alvin Alcorn (1964), Onward Brass Band (1965), Eureka Brass Band (1969), and Captain John Handy (1970). He recorded as a leader in 1969 for the album Down By the Riverside.

== Personal life ==
Morgan died in New Orleans, aged 71.
