= Achille Baquet =

American jazz clarinetist and saxophonist (1885–c. 1956)

Achille Joseph Baquet (November 15, 1885 – November 20, 1955/1956) was an American jazz clarinetist and saxophonist. He was an early musician on the New Orleans jazz scene.

Baquet was raised in a musical family. His father, Théogène Baquet, led the Excelsior Brass Band, and his brothers, Harold, and George, were both musicians, George being the most famous of the three. Achille was black ("Creole of Color" in the local terminology), but was light-skinned, and was the only member of the family who was able to pass for white. He learned clarinet from Luis Tio, and played with the Original Dixieland Jazz Band, Papa Jack Laine's Reliance Brass Band, and the Happy Schilling Dance Orchestra.

Baquet was thought to have been a member of the Whiteway Jazz Band, but the membership of this ensemble has never been established definitively. Jimmy Durante, who assumed leadership of the Original New Orleans Jazz Band, hired Baquet in 1918.

Baquet's credits as a composer include "Why Cry Blues", written with Jimmy Durante. According to Papa Jack Laine, he co-wrote "Livery Stable Blues" with Yellow Nunez.
