= Papa French =

American musician (1910–1977)

Albert "Papa" French Sr. (November 16, 1910 – September 28, 1977) was an American jazz musician, banjo player, and band leader in New Orleans.

== Career ==
He was a banjo player in the Original Tuxedo Brass Band of New Orleans. This band was founded in 1910 and led for 44 years by Papa Celestin. After the death of Papa Celestin in 1954, leadership was briefly taken over by trombonist Eddie Pierson until his death in 1958. The leadership of the band fell to Banjo player Albert French, who was called "Papa" French as a token of endearment of the Late Papa Celestin. Papa French led the band until his death in 1977.

He released the traditional jazz LP A Night At Dixieland Hall, recorded live in 1965. Released on the Nobility label as Nobility 702, this set was recorded at Dixieland Hall, 522 Bourbon Street, New Orleans. It featured Jeanette Kimball on Piano, Louis Barbarin on drums (incorrectly spelled "Louise" on the LP liner notes), Steward Davis on Bass Fiddle, Joseph "Cornbread" Thomas on Clarinet and Vocals, Waldren "Frog" Joseph on Trombone, Wendell Eugene on Trombone, and the well known Alvin Alcorn on Trumpet.

== Death ==
French died in 1977 and was funeralized at Our Lady of Lourdes Catholic Church in New Orleans.

== Personal life ==
Albert's son Bob French was a successful New Orleans musician and radio host who led the Tuxedo Jazz Band for decades after the death of his father in 1977.
