= Ride, Red, Ride in Hi-Fi =

Studio album by Henry "Red" Allen
- Released: 1957
- Recorded: 1957
- Genre: Jazz
- Length: 60:58
- Label: RCA Victor

Henry "Red" Allen chronology
Red Allen, Kid Ory & Jack Teagarden at Newport (1957)	Ride, Red, Ride in Hi-Fi (1957)

Professional ratings
Review scores
Source	Rating
AllMusic	5/5 stars

Ride, Red, Ride in Hi-Fi is a 1957 album by jazz trumpeter Henry "Red" Allen. The album was reissued on CD as World on a String.

== Track listing ==
1. "Love Is Just Around the Corner" – 5:49
2. "Let Me Miss You" – 5:31
3. "Ride, Red, Ride" – 4:40
4. "I Cover the Waterfront" – 8:25
5. "'S Wonderful" (George Gershwin, Ira Gershwin) – 5:29
6. "St. James Infirmary" – 3:45
7. "Algiers Bounce" – 6:48
8. "Love Me or Leave Me" (Walter Donaldson, Gus Kahn) – 5:13
9. "I've Got the World on a String" – 5:36
10. "Ain't She Sweet" (Milton Ager, Jack Yellen) – 4:08
11. "Sweet Lorraine" – 5:34

== Personnel ==
- Red Allen – trumpet, vocals
- Buster Bailey – clarinet
- Coleman Hawkins – tenor saxophone
- J. C. Higginbotham – trombone
- Everett Barksdale – guitar
- Marty Napoleon – piano
- Lloyd Trotman – double bass
- Cozy Cole – drums
