= Honoré Dutrey =

Dixieland jazz trombonist (1894-1933)

- Born: 1894 New Orleans, Louisiana, United States
- Died: July 21, 1935 (aged 40–41) Chicago, Illinois, United States
- Genres: Dixieland jazz
- Instrument: Trombone

Honoré Dutrey (c. 1894 in New Orleans, Louisiana – July 21, 1935 in Chicago, Illinois) was a Dixieland jazz trombonist, probably best known for his work in King Oliver's Creole Jazz Band. In New Orleans, Dutrey played with the Excelsior Brass Band and with John Robichaux's orchestra.

His playing has been contrasted with that of other New Orleans trombonists such as Kid Ory, in that he met the older harmonic and rhythmic functions. Recording with King Oliver's Creole Jazz Band, Dutrey displays his clean tailgate style. Rather than crowding the polyphonic improvisation of the other musicians, his transparent playing offers the important element of stable harmonic counterpoint.

He suffered from asthma most of his life after a ship accident damaged his lungs while he was in the Navy in 1917. To combat his asthma on the band stand, he would inhale a nasal spray prescribed to him by a doctor. Eugene Chadbourne wrote that Louis Armstrong worked with many trombonists in his career, "[but as] great as some of them were [...] there was never another Honore Dutrey," likely referring to his smooth glissando style.

Asthma was the cause of Dutrey's death on July 21, 1935.
