= Lizzie Miles =

American Afro-Creole blues singer (1895–1963)

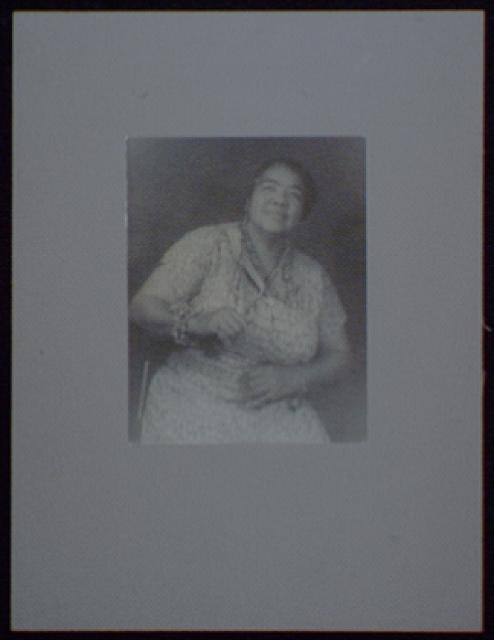
- Lizzie Miles (1957)

Background information
- Also known as: Miss Frankie (possibly)
- Born: March 31, 1895; New Orleans, Louisiana, United States
- Died: March 17, 1963 (aged 67) New Orleans, Louisiana, United States
- Genres: Blues
- Occupation: Singer

Elizabeth Mary Landreaux (March 31, 1895 – March 17, 1963), known by the stage name Lizzie Miles, was an Afro-Creole blues singer in the United States.

== Biography ==
Miles was born in the Faubourg Marigny neighborhood of New Orleans, Louisiana, in an Afro-Creole Kouri-Vini (Louisiana Creole) speaking family. As a child, she sang in her Catholic church and performed at parties and dances. She worked with Joe Oliver, Kid Ory, Bunk Johnson, and A.J. Piron from 1909 to 1911. She then toured the South, performing in theaters, circuses, and with minstrel shows owned/managed by J. Augustus Jones, Elmer H. Jones and their family. In 1917 she sang in Chicago with Manuel Manetta, and then, in 1921 with Freddie Keppard, Charlie Elgar, and again with Oliver. She moved to New York and made her first phonograph recordings in 1922. They were blues songs, but she did not like to be referred to as a blues singer since she sang a wide repertoire. She also worked at Dashy's Inn Golf Club as a soloist.

Miles toured Europe in 1924 and 1925 and then returned to New York and worked in clubs from 1926 to 1931. During this time she worked with her half-brother, Herb Morand. Miles recorded as leader of a trio with Oliver, and in a duo with Jelly Roll Morton. There is uncertainty in that some sources suggest that several of the Miss Frankie recordings were the work of Lizzie Miles. This particularly applies to the tracks "When You Get Tired of Your New Sweetie", and "Shooting Star Blues", issued on Conqueror Records (January 1928).

She suffered a serious illness and retired from the music industry in the 1930s, not before she recorded "My Man o' War", described by one music journalist as "a composition stuffed with rococo suggestiveness". Despite her illness, Miles appeared in two films in the early 1930s. She began working regularly again in 1935, performing with Paul Barbarin at the Strollers Club in New York. She sang with Fats Waller in 1938 and then worked in Chicago until she left music in 1942.

In 1950, Miles lived in California where she sang with George Lewis in 1953 and 1954. She performed and spent time with Bob Scobey in Las Vegas, Nevada, from 1955 to 1957. She sang with Joe Darensbourg in Chicago in 1958 and 1959. She returned to New Orleans, where she appeared with Freddie Kohlman and Paul Barbarin. She recorded with several Dixieland and traditional jazz bands, appeared at the Monterey Jazz Festival in 1958, and made regular radio broadcasts before retiring in 1959.

In 1959 she quit singing, except for gospel music. She began working closely with the Sisters of the Holy Family, an order of Black religious in the city, declaring that she had decided "to live the life of a nun". She died of a heart attack, in March 1963, at the sisters' Lafon Nursing Home in New Orleans and was buried in the city at Saint Louis Cemetery No. 3.

Woody Allen included her version of "A Good Man Is Hard to Find" on the soundtrack of his 2013 film Blue Jasmine.

Her half-sister, Edna Hicks, was also a blues singer.

== Personal life ==
She married August Pajaud in New Orleans, Louisiana on May 9, 1912. The marriage certificate indicates that she was 19 [sic].

She married John C. Miles, from whom she took her stage name, in Norfolk, Virginia in 1914. He was a bandleader also working for the Jones brothers. J.C. Miles died of Spanish flu in Shreveport, Louisiana on October 19, 1918 while on tour and was buried in Crown Hill Cemetery, Indianapolis, Indiana.

== Selected discography ==
Year of release	Album title	Label
1956	Hot Songs My Mother Taught Me	Cook Records
1956	Moans and Blues	Cook Records
1956	Torchy Lullabies My Mother Sang Me	Cook Records
1956	A Night In Old New Orleans	Capitol Records/Southland Records
1957	Bourbon Street	Verve Records
1959	Lizzie Miles With Tony Almerico's Dixieland Band	Rondo Record Corporation

=== Singles released in 1922 ===
The following singles were all released in 1922 by Okeh Records:

- "Wicked Blues"
- "Take It 'Cause It's All Yours"
- "Lonesome Monday Morning Blues"
- "Please Don't Tickle Me, Babe"
- "He May Be Your Man, but He Comes to See Me Sometimes"
- "Muscle Shoals Blues"
- "She Walked Right Up and Took My Man"

== See also ==
- Classic female blues
- Emerson Records
- Southland Records
- Circle Records
- List of classic female blues singers
- List of people from New Orleans
