= Karl George (musician) =

American jazz musician (1913–1978)

- Birth name: Karl Curtis George
- Born: April 26, 1913; St. Louis, Missouri, U.S.
- Died: May 1978 (aged 68)
- Genres: Jazz
- Instruments: Trumpet

Karl Curtis George (April 26, 1913 – May 1978) was an American jazz trumpeter. He was born in St. Louis, Missouri.

== Career ==
Early in his career, George played with McKinney's Cotton Pickers (1933) and Cecil Lee. Later in the 1930s he spent time in the Jeter-Pillars Orchestra and then in the orchestras of Teddy Wilson (1939–1940) and Lionel Hampton (1941–42). He served in the United States Army in 1942 and 1943, then moved to California and played with Stan Kenton (1943), Benny Carter (1944), Count Basie (1945), and Happy Johnson (1946). He led his own group on record in 1945 and 1946, and played in sessions led by Charles Mingus, Slim Gaillard, Oscar Pettiford, Dinah Washington, and Lucky Thompson.

== Personal life ==
George retired from music after the late-1940s due to ill health. He died in 1978.

== Discography ==
With Count Basie

- The Original American Decca Recordings (GRP, 1992)

With Stan Kenton

- Stan Kenton's Milestones (Capitol, 1950)
- Stan Kenton Classics (Capitol, 1952)
- The Kenton Era (Capitol, 1955)

With Dinah Washington

- Mellow Mama (Delmark, 1992)
