= Elbert Pee Wee Claybrook =

American jazz swing musician

Elbert "Pee Wee" Claybrook (March 13, 1912 – February 25, 1996) was a tenor saxophonist from St. Louis, Missouri. He played jazz for over 50 years. He began his musical career in the late 1930s playing with the Fate Marable Mississippi riverboat band.

In the 1930s, he was playing with many famous jazz artists such as Jimmy Blanton, Jimmy Forrest, Sid Catlett, Art Blakey, Sweets Edison and Clark Terry. In 1942, Pee Wee and his buddy Clark Terry were inducted into the U.S. Navy, and sent to the Great Lakes Naval Training Station band near Chicago, Illinois. In 1944, he was reassigned to the Navy's Pre-Flight School located at St. Mary's College in Moraga, California.

== Career ==
Claybrook hailed from St. Louis Missouri helping to kindle the big band music scene along with Clark Terry, trumpeter, bands like George Hudson's Orchestra, Eddie Randall's Blue Devils, Dewey Jackson, Jeter-Pillars Orchestra, St. Louis Crackerjacks.

In 1944 Pee Wee Claybrook was transferred out West to California. The big band era was waning after World War II. After being in the Navy Pee Wee stayed in California, and played with Earl Hines known as (Earl "Fatha" Hines) in San Francisco. Pee Wee continued his musical relationship with Vernon Alley, who had also been a member of the U.S. Navy 45-piece regimental band at the Navy's Pre-Flight School located at St. Mary's College, in Moraga, California. He was a family man and 'he kept his day job'. He bought a home in the new community, Parchester Village, Richmond, California, that was developed after WWII.

In 1995, Peewee reunited with his longtime navy and musical friend Clark Terry for a historic reunion concert at Berkeley's The Freight and Salvage Club. The reunion was recorded and Pee Wee was in excellent form on his tenor saxophone at the age of 84. The session was released 1995 as the album Reunion: Clark Terry and Pee Wee Claybrook.

Claybrook was an immense contributor to the Bay Area Jazz scene for over 50 years. He played with the Swing Fever Band performing at many of the Northern California jazz clubs, concert tours, Monterey Jazz Festival, Cotati Jazz Festival, and the Los Angeles Classic Jazz Festival. Because of his immense influence in the music scene in Jazz music in Northern California, the Napa Valley Jazz Festival established the "Peewee Claybrook Award". Thanks to Peewee's collaborations with Clark Terry his sounds are heard and known to international jazz audiences.

== Discography ==
- Reunion: Clark Terry and Pee Wee Claybrook, released November 21, 1995
- Grand Masters of Jazz, released October 15, 2013 on the Openart label, with the Swing Fever Big Band
