= Freddie Kohlman =

American jazz musician and bandleader

Louis Freddie Kohlman (August 25, 1918 – September 29, 1990, aged 72) was an American jazz drummer, vocalist, and bandleader who was a native of New Orleans. He studied under the famed drummer Louis Cottrell, Sr., and Manuel Manetta.

== Biography ==
Freddie Kohlman was born in New Orleans and began playing professionally as a teenager, working with A. J. Piron, Joe Robichaux, Papa Celestin, and Sam Morgan. He moved to Chicago in the middle of the 1930s, where he played with Albert Ammons, Stuff Smith, Earl Hines, and Lee Collins. After returning to New Orleans in 1941, he led his own band from 1944. Among the musicians in his band was pianist Dave "Fat Man" Williams. In the mid-1950s he played briefly with Louis Armstrong and recorded as a leader with the Jambalaya Four (1953), then became the house drummer at Jazz, Ltd. in Chicago ("where he played with everyone from Billie Holiday to Art Hodes") before returning to New Orleans once again in the 1960s. There he played with Louis Cottrell, Jr., the Dukes of Dixieland, and the Onward Brass Band (1968). In 1969 he appeared at the New Orleans Jazz Festival. As a member of the Preservation Hall Jazz Band, he traveled widely in the United States and overseas.

He played in European festivals with his own groups in the 1970s and 1980s. He recorded with Chris Barber and Dr. John in 1980, and also appears on record with Albert Nicholas, Art Hodes, Bob Wilber, Harry Connick, Jr., the Excelsior Brass Band, and the Heritage Hall Jazz Band.

Kohlman appeared in several films, including Pete Kelly's Blues, Pretty Baby and Angel Heart.

He died of cancer at his home in New Orleans, aged 75.

== Selected discography ==
- Freddie Kohlman, 1955
- All of Me, 1977
