= Joe Robichaux =

American jazz pianist (1900–1965)

- Born: March 8, 1900; New Orleans, Louisiana, US
- Died: January 17, 1965 (aged 64); New Orleans, Louisiana, US
- Occupation: Jazz pianist
- Relatives: John Robichaux

Joseph Robichaux (March 8, 1900 – January 17, 1965) was an American jazz pianist. He was the nephew of John Robichaux.

== Life and career ==
Robichaux was born in New Orleans, Louisiana, United States, and played piano from a young age and studied at New Orleans University. After working in the O.J. Beatty Carnival, he played with Tig Chambers briefly in 1918. He then returned to New Orleans and played with Oscar Celestin, Earl Humphrey, Lee Collins, and The Black Eagles (1922–23).

He arranged for the Jones-Collins Astoria Hot Eight in 1929 and also recorded with them; he also accompanied Christina Gray on record that year. In 1931, he formed his own ensemble, which featured Eugene Ware on trumpet, Alfred Guichard on clarinet and alto saxophone, Gene Porter on tenor sax, and Ward Crosby on drums.

They journeyed to New York City to record for Vocalion in August 1933, laying down 22 mostly stomping, uptempo sides and two alternate takes in a marathon five day recording schedule, which included Rene Hall on tenor banjo. Vocalion issued 10 records over the next year and two tracks with Chick Bullock vocals were issued under his name on Banner, Domino, Oriole, Perfect, and Romeo.

Problems with the musicians' union in New York prevented them from being able to play live there, and they returned to New Orleans not long after recording. Robichaux expanded the size of his ensemble over the course of the 1930s; Earl Bostic was among those who joined its ranks. They toured Cuba in the mid-1930s.

The band also recorded for Decca Records in 1936, recording four sides in New Orleans, but these were all rejected.

In 1939, Robichaux's ensemble disbanded, and he found work performing solo, mostly in New Orleans. He recorded as an accompanist on R&B recordings in the 1950s, and played with Lizzie Miles.

Late in his life he played with George Lewis (1957–64) and Peter Bocage (1962); he also performed at Preservation Hall.

He died of a heart attack, in New Orleans, at the age of 64 in 1965.

== Discography ==
=== As leader ===
- The Complete Robichaux (Blue-Disc, 1980)

=== As sideman ===
With George Lewis

- Dr. Jazz (Verve, 1957)
- George Lewis & Turk Murphy at Newport (Verve, 1957)
- The Perennial George Lewis (Verve, 1958)
- Oh, Didn't He Ramble! (Verve, 1959)
- Blues from the Bayou (Verve, 1959)
- George Lewis in Tokyo 1964 (King, 1964)
- Plays Hymns (Milneburg, 1965)
- George Lewis & His New Orleans All-Stars (Catalyst, 1976)
- Live at Club Hangover (Dawn Club, 1983)
- George Lewis in Japan (G.H.B., 1994)

With others

- Peter Bocage, New Orleans Legends Live Volume 23 (Jazzology, 1982)
- Louis Nelson, Louis Nelson Big Four (G.H.B., 1996)
