= George Baquet =

American jazz clarinetist (1881-1949)

George Francis Baquet (July 22, 1881 – Jan. 14, 1949) was an American jazz clarinetist, known for his contributions to early jazz in New Orleans. His father, Theogene V. Baquet, eminent New Orleans musician and educator, was also a clarinetist, as were his brothers, Achille and Harold.

Baquet's professional career began in 1897 while he was still in his early teens. He played in the Lyre Club Symphony Orchestra and then on the road with P.T. Wright's Nashville Students Company. He then joined the Georgia Minstrels, but returned to New Orleans in 1905, where he played with Buddy Bolden. In the 1900s and early 1910s he played off and on with John Robichaux, Freddie Keppard, and the Onward Brass Band. Baquet and Keppard played in Los Angeles with the Original Creole Orchestra, an ensemble Baquet remained in until 1916.

Later in the decade Baquet played in New York City at Coney Island. In 1923, he joined the Lafayette Players, in Philadelphia, where Baquet lived until his death. He assembled several of his own groups, including the New Orleans Nighthawks and George Bakey's Swingsters (sic). In the 1920s, Baquet recorded with Bessie Smith; in 1929, he recorded with Jelly Roll Morton, and in the 1940s with Sidney Bechet.
