= Albert Snaer =

American jazz musician

Albert Snaer (January 29, 1902 – 1962) was an American jazz trumpeter.

Snaer was born, in New Orleans, Louisiana and there studied with Paul Chaligny. He worked on riverboats on the Mississippi River in the 1920s, playing in the bands of Fate Marable, Dewey Jackson, and George Augustin. With Augustin, he co-led a band called the Moonlight Serenaders. He played in the Excelsior Brass Band before moving to New York City in 1928.

In the 1930s Snaer played with Andy Kirk and Leroy Smith, but spent most of his time as a member of Claude Hopkins's orchestra. He went into semiretirement in the 1940s, starting up a dry cleaning business in Connecticut. He played on some of Sidney Bechet's recordings in the late 1940s. In the middle of the 1950s he moved to San Francisco, where he played with Big Boy Goudie. In 1960 it was thought that he had died, and several papers ran obituaries about him; he did not actually die until 1962.
