= George Guesnon =

American jazz musician

Creole George Guesnon (May 25, 1907, New Orleans, Louisiana – May 6, 1968, New Orleans) was an American jazz banjoist, guitarist, and singer.

When he was twelve years old, Guesnon bought a ukulele under the influence of an uncle who played guitar. After completing school, he worked for his father, who was a plasterer. At twenty, he began substituting for banjoist Earl Stockmeyer at a cabaret. He received banjo lessons from John Marrero and then took his spot in the Papa Celestin band. Soon after, he took Danny Barker's place in the Willie Pajeaud band. He worked in Sam Morgan's band from 1930–35, then played briefly in Monroe, Louisiana with Lou Johnson's Californians.

In 1936, he moved to Jackson, Mississippi, where he played in a band led by Little Brother Montgomery. He recorded for the first time in 1936 on his song "Goodbye, Good Luck to You" with piano accompaniment by Montgomery. He did two tours with the Rabbit Foot Minstrels, then returned to New Orleans in 1938. But he found little work there and moved to New York City. In 1940 he recorded four songs in New York for Decca in addition to playing with Trixie Smith and Jelly Roll Morton. He worked for Pullman trains, then enlisted in the Merchant Marines when World War II started. He played locally in Louisiana in the 1950s, with the Mighty Four at the Melody Inn from 1953 to 1955, and toured with George Lewis in 1955. On several occasions he recorded with Kid Thomas Valentine and performed at Preservation Hall in his native New Orleans.
