= Jeanette Kimball =

American jazz pianist

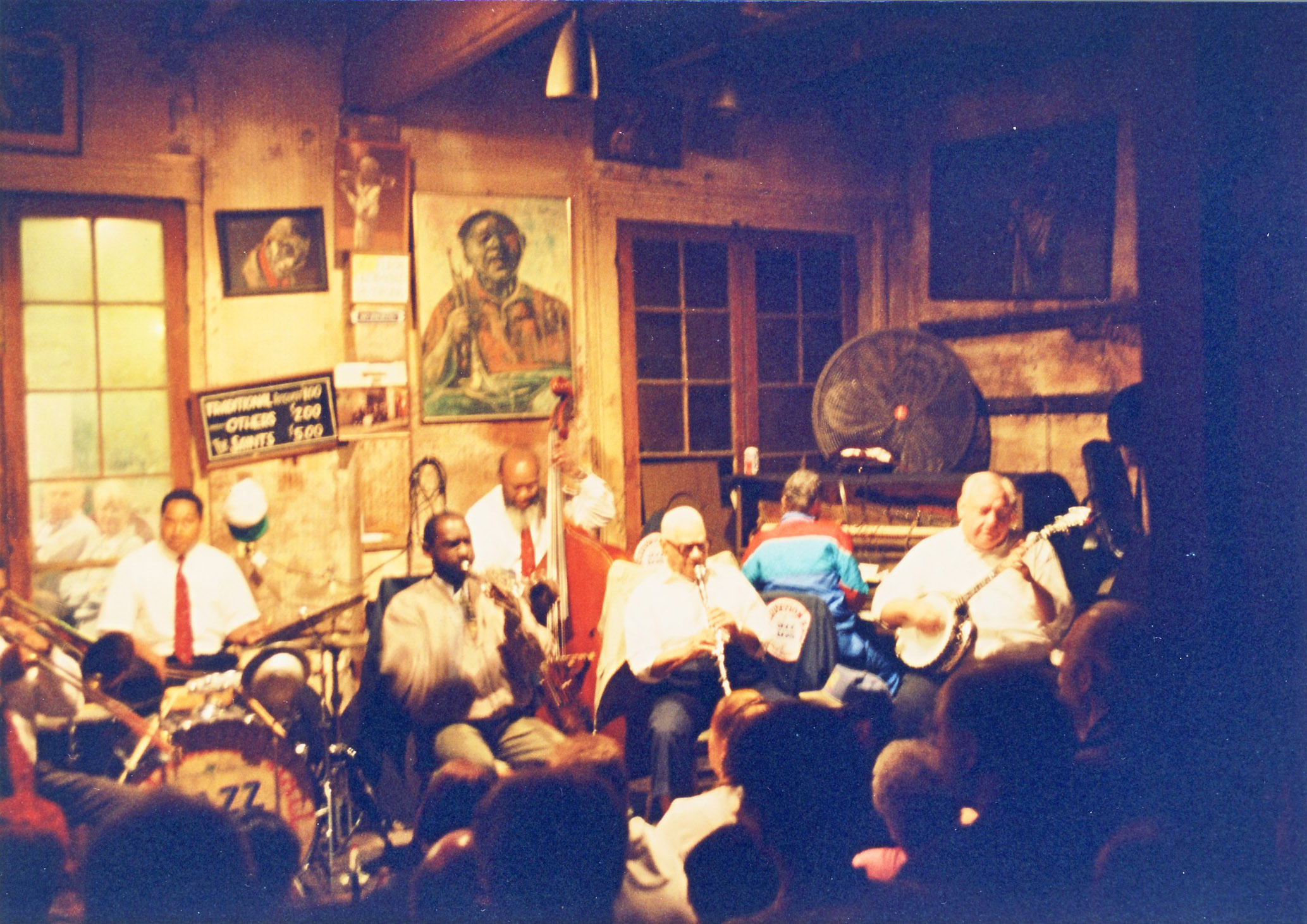
Preservation Hall Jazz Band, with Kimball on piano, playing in New Orleans

Jeanette Kimball (18 December 1906 – 28 March 2001), née Jeanette Salvant, was a classically trained American jazz pianist who played in jazz bands for more than 70 years, mostly in New Orleans. She received the Black Men of Labor Jazz Legacy Award in 1998.

== Life and work ==
Born in Pass Christian, Mississippi, Kimball came from a family with French Creole roots and was the niece of blues pianist Isadore "Tuts" Washington. At seven, she began playing the piano; as a teenager, she performed as a professional musician with classical string formations, then on the field of jazz. She played in the course of her 70-year-long career in traditional jazz bands, first in 1926 in a "Society" dance band, Papa Celestin's Original Tuxedo Orchestra, with whom she went on tour in the southern United States. In 1929, she married the banjo- and guitar player Narvin Kimball, who also belonged to Papa Celestin's band. In 1935 she left the band to raise their children. After her divorce, she used the name Kimball further and started her career anew in the mid-1940s. Among other things, she worked with Buddy Charles, Herb Leary and Sidney Desvigne. In addition, she served as organist and choir director at Holy Ghost Catholic Church.

In the 1950s, Kimball worked again with Papa Celestin, when he reactivated his band, which then was under the guidance of Papa French. She was also a member of the Preservation Hall Jazz Band and played with Clive Wilson's Original Camellia Jazz Band. She appeared in 1976 on the Jazz Festival Breda live album Jeanette Kimball Meets the Fondy Riverside Bullet Band; their album Sophisticated Lady (with Frank Fields and Freddie Kohlman) was released in 1999. That same year she was honored with the Black Men of Labor Jazz Legacy Award. In the field of jazz, Kimball worked between 1953 and 1991 with 72 recording sessions, among others with Alvin Alcorn, Paul Barbarin, Papa Celestin, Punch Miller and Johnny St. Cyr.

She left New Orleans in the 1990s to live in Ohio and South Carolina. She died in Charleston, South Carolina, at the age of 94.
