= Mellow Mama =

Compilation album by Dinah Washington
- Released: 1992
- Recorded: December 10, 12–13, 1945
- Studio: Los Angeles
- Genre: Jazz
- Length: 34:27
- Label: Delmark; DD-451
- Producer: Robert G. Koester, Steve Wagner

Mellow Mama is an album by the American jazz vocalist Dinah Washington, compiling her early recordings from 1945 with Lucky Thompson and His All Stars that were originally issued by Apollo Records. It was released by the Delmark label in 1992.

== Reception ==
Professional ratings
Review scores
Source	Rating
AllMusic	4.5/5 stars
The Penguin Guide to Jazz Recordings	3/4 stars

AllMusic reviewer Scott Yanow stated: "Recorded in Los Angeles during a three-day period, the 12 selections feature the singer with a swinging jazz combo that has tenor-saxophonist Lucky Thompson, trumpeter Karl George, vibraphonist Milt Jackson and bassist Charles Mingus among its eight members. The 21-year-old Washington was already quite distinctive at this early stage and easily handles the blues and jive material with color and humor. Recommended".

== Track listing ==
All compositions by John Henry except where noted

1. "Mellow Mama Blues" (Jessie Mae Robinson) – 3:05
2. "All or Nothing Blues" – 2:49
3. "Rich Man's Blues" (Thelma Lowe) – 2:51
4. "Chewin' Mama Blues" – 2:54
5. "Blues for a Day" – 2:49
6. "Wise Woman Blues" – 2:46
7. "My Voot Is Really Vout" – 3:07
8. "Pacific Coast Blues" (Robinson) – 2:37
9. "Beggin' Mama Blues" (Wilbert Barranco, Charles Mingus) – 2:49
10. "Walking Blues" (Lowe) – 2:38
11. "No Voot, No Boot" (Duke Henderson) – 3:00
12. "My Lovin' Papa" (Henderson) – 3:02

== Personnel ==
- Dinah Washington – vocals
- Karl George – trumpet
- Jewel Grant – alto saxophone
- Lucky Thompson – tenor saxophone
- Gene Porter – baritone saxophone, clarinet
- Milt Jackson – vibraphone (tracks 1, 3–7 & 9–12)
- Wilbert Baranco – piano
- Charles Mingus – bass
- Lee Young – drums

Recorded in Los Angeles on December 10, 1945 (tracks 4, 6, 10 & 11), December 12, 1945 (tracks 2, 3, 9 & 12) and December 13, 1945 (tracks 1, 5, 7 & 8)
