= Perseverance Hall =

- U.S. National Register of Historic Places
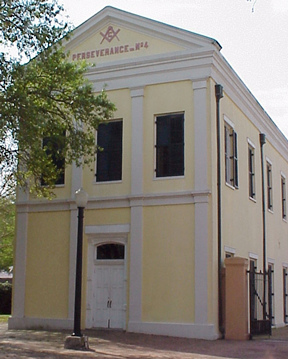
- Front of the hall

- Location within East New Orleans Location within Louisiana Location within the United States
- Location: 901 St. Claude Ave., New Orleans, Louisiana
- Coordinates: 29°57′46″N 90°4′4″W
- Area: less than one acre
- Built: 1820
- Architect: Correjolles & Chaigneau
- Architectural style: Greek Revival
- NRHP reference No.: 73000871
- Added to NRHP: October 2, 1973

Perseverance Hall No. 4 is a historic building within the Louis Armstrong Park in New Orleans, Louisiana, United States. Originally a Masonic lodge, it was built between 1819 and 1820, making it the oldest Masonic temple in Louisiana.

Its historic significance is based on its use for dances, where Louisiana Creole jazz performers and bands reportedly played for black and white audiences. Various organizations, both black and white, rented Perseverance Hall for dances, concerts, Monday night banquets, and recitals. The building was used by multiple masonic lodges, mainly Persévérance no. 4 (FR), but also l'Etoile Polaire no. 1 (FR), Germania Lodge no. 46 (AASR), Amor Fraternal no. 4 (AASR), Trinosophes no. 1 (AASR), Perfect Union no. 1 (YR).

During the early 20th century, some bands, such as the Golden Rule Band, were barred from appearing at Perseverance Hall, apparently because management considered them too undignified for the place. The building also served as a terminal point for Labor Day parades involving white and black bands. During the 1920s and 1930s, well past the formative years of jazz, various jazz bands played there.

Perseverance Hall was listed on the National Register of Historic Places on October 2, 1973.
