= Isaiah Morgan =

American jazz trumpeter (1897–1966)

Isaiah "Ike" Morgan (April 7, 1897 – May 11, 1966) was an American jazz trumpeter.

Morgan was born in Bertrandville, Louisiana, into a musical family; he was the brother of Al Morgan, Sam Morgan, and Andrew Morgan. He played in Plaquemines Parish in the early 1910s and then moved to New Orleans. He led his brothers in the Young Morgan Band from 1922, which was later led by Sam Morgan; this ensemble recorded for Columbia Records . After Sam suffered a stroke in 1932, Isiah resumed leadership of the group, but it disassembled in 1933. He was a bandleader in the Biloxi, Mississippi area in the 1930s and 1940s, and played with Andrew there as well. Isaiah recorded in 1955 on an album called Dance Hall Days, Vol. 1; his group at this time featured Freddie Land on piano. He retired from music the following year, and died in New Orleans.
