= Louis Snaer =

American politician

Louis A. Snaer (June 13, 1842 - 1917) was a state legislator in Louisiana. He served as an officer in the Louisiana Native Guard. He was Creole.

Snaer was seriously wounded in the American Civil War. He was honored for bravery. He was a Republican after the war. He had a wife Maria and three children. He died in California.

He was documented in the House as "of Iberia". He served two terms in the House. Other offices held by Snaer include school board director.

He was a storekeeper at the New Orleans Custom House. In 1866 he testified he saw police firing into the Mechanics Institute and at African Americans trying to escape and found them in his store where goods were missing. He and Samuel Wakefield were the proprietors of the Iberia Banner newspaper.

Sosthene L. Snaer represented Saint Martin Parish at the Louisiana Constitutional Convention of 1868. Samuel Snaer was a musician and composer in New Orleans.

Lerome Snaer is one of his descendants.
