= Little Sonny Jones =

American singer

Background information
- Born: Johnny Jones; April 15, 1931; New Orleans, Louisiana, United States
- Died: December 17, 1989 (aged 58) New Orleans, Louisiana, United States
- Genres: New Orleans blues
- Occupations: Singer, songwriter
- Instrument: Vocals
- Years active: Late 1940s–1989
- Label: Black Top

Johnny "Little Sonny" Jones (April 15, 1931 – December 17, 1989) was an American New Orleans blues singer and songwriter. Over his lengthy career, he worked with various blues musicians, notably Fats Domino.

He is not to be confused with the blues musicians Little Sonny and Little Sonny Warner.

== Biography ==
Jones was born in New Orleans, Louisiana. He started singing professionally in the late 1940s. He befriended Fats Domino and, while they were working together, was given his nickname by Domino. In 1953 he released his debut single, "Do You Really Love Me" backed with "Is Everything Allright?", for Specialty Records. He recorded another four songs for Imperial Records in 1954, produced by Dave Bartholomew, but his records failed to find a commercial market. His connection with Domino endured, and he remained as Domino's opening act until 1961. Jones's tracks included the blues standard "Farther Up the Road".

Jones was employed as the vocalist by a New Orleans–based band led by the brothers David and Melvin Lastie, until the late 1960s. He also had regular employment at a sugar factory. He returned to the recording studio in 1975 and issued the album New Orleans R&B Gems, initially on the Netherlands-based Black Magic label. With contributions from veteran musicians, including Dave "Fat Man" Williams, the record faithfully copied the R&B style and sound of the 1950s. It was reissued in 1995 by Black Top Records.

Jones was a regular performer at the New Orleans Jazz & Heritage Festival.

In December 1989, Jones died of heart failure in New Orleans, at the age of 58.

== Discography ==
Album title	Record label	Year of original release
New Orleans R&B Gems	Black Top (reissue, 1995)	1975

== See also ==
- List of New Orleans blues musicians
