= Red Allen =

American jazz trumpeter and vocalist (1908–1967)

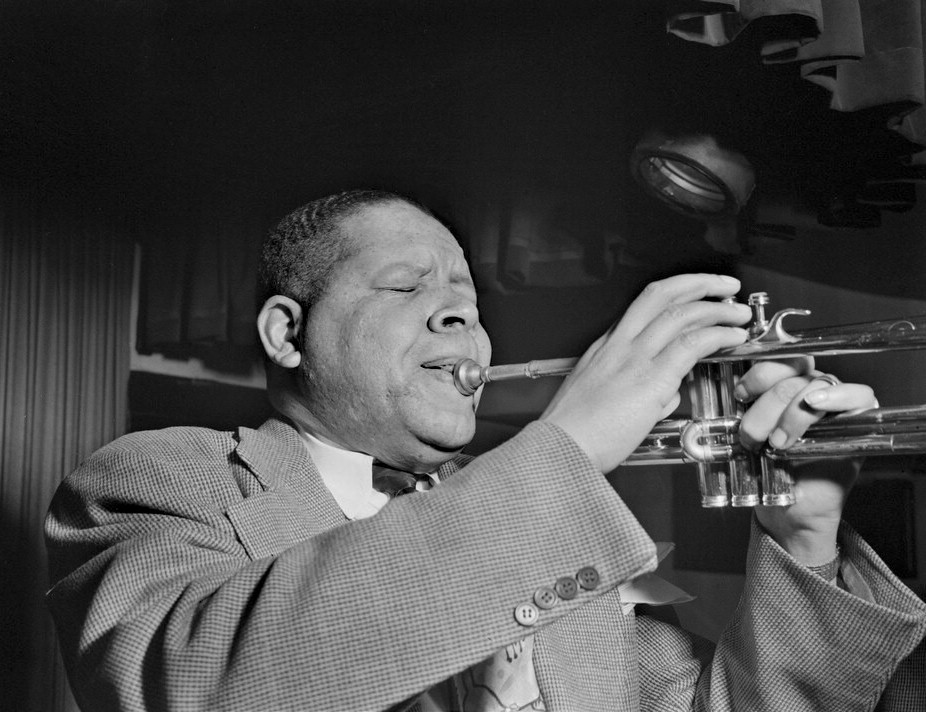
- Allen at the Onyx Club, New York City c. May 1946; Photo: William P. Gottlieb

Background information
- Born: Henry James Allen Jr. January 7, 1908; Algiers, New Orleans, Louisiana, U.S.
- Died: April 17, 1967 (aged 59) New York City, New York, U.S.
- Genre: Jazz
- Occupation: Musician
- Instrument: Trumpet
- Years active: 1924–1967

Henry James "Red" Allen Jr. (January 7, 1908 – April 17, 1967) was an American jazz trumpeter and vocalist whose playing has been described by Joachim-Ernst Berendt and others as the first to fully incorporate the innovations of Louis Armstrong.

== Life and career ==
Allen was born in the Algiers neighborhood of New Orleans, Louisiana, the son of the bandleader Henry James Allen Sr. He took early trumpet lessons from Peter Bocage and Manuel Manetta. His career began in Sidney Desvigne's Southern Syncopators. He was playing professionally by 1924 with the Excelsior Brass Band and the jazz dance bands of Sam Morgan, George Lewis and John Casimir. After playing on riverboats on the Mississippi River, he went to Chicago in 1927 to join King Oliver's band. Around this time he made recordings on the side in the band of Clarence Williams.

After returning briefly to New Orleans, where he worked with the bands of Fate Marable and Fats Pichon, he was offered a recording contract with Victor Records and went to New York City, where he joined the Luis Russell band, which was later fronted by Louis Armstrong in the late 1930s.

In 1929, Allen joined Luis Russell's Orchestra, in which he was a featured soloist until 1932. He took part in recording sessions that year organized by Eddie Condon, some of which featured Fats Waller and Tommy Dorsey. He also made a series of recordings in late 1931 with Don Redman. In 1932 he recorded with the Rhythmakers in New York City. In 1933 he joined Fletcher Henderson's Orchestra, in which he stayed until 1934. He played with Lucky Millinder's Mills Blue Rhythm Band from 1934 to 1937, when he returned to Russell for three more years, by which time Russell's orchestra was fronted by Louis Armstrong. Allen seldom received any solo space on recordings with Armstrong, but was prominently featured in the band's live performances, even getting billing as a featured attraction.

As a bandleader, Allen recorded for Victor from 1929 through 1930. He made a series of recordings as co-leader with Coleman Hawkins in 1933 for ARC (Banner, Melotone, Oriole, Perfect, Romeo, etc.) and continued as an ARC recording artist through 1935, when he was moved to ARC's Vocalion label for a popular series of swing records from 1935 through late 1937. A number of these were popular at the time. He did a solitary session for Decca in 1940 and two sessions for OKeh in 1941. After World War II, he recorded for Brunswick in 1944, Victor in 1946, and Apollo in 1947.

Allen continued making many recordings under his own name and also with Fats Waller and Jelly Roll Morton and accompanied such vocalists as Victoria Spivey and Billie Holiday. After a short stint with Benny Goodman, Allen began to lead his own band at the Famous Door in Manhattan. He then toured with the band around the United States into the late 1950s.

In December 1957, Allen appeared with Pee Wee Russell on the television program Sound Of Jazz. In 1959, he made his first tour of Europe when he joined Kid Ory's band. He led the house band at New York's Metropole Cafe from 1954, until the club ceased its jazz policy in 1965.

== Personal life and death ==
Allen was Catholic.

Allen returned to working under his own name and made numerous tours of the United States and Europe. He was diagnosed with pancreatic cancer in late 1966. After undergoing surgery, he made a final tour of England, which ended six weeks before his death, on April 17, 1967, in New York City. He is buried, in the newer section of Saint Raymond's Cemetery in the Bronx, in grave 52 of section 15. He was survived by his widow, Pearly May, and a son, Henry Allen III.

== Style and influence ==
Allen's trumpet style has been described by Joachim-Ernst Berendt and others as the first to fully incorporate the innovations of Louis Armstrong, and to develop an emphasis on phrasing. Allen's recordings received much favorable attention. His versatility is shown by his winning of DownBeat awards in both the traditional jazz and the modern jazz categories.

In 2022, the New Orleans City Council voted to rename "Slidell Street" in Algiers to "Red Allen Way", in his honor.

== Discography ==
- 1929-33 - The Chronological (Classics) 540, 1990)
- 1935-36 - The Chronological (Classics 575, 1990)
- 1936-37 - The Chronological (Classics 590, 1990)
- 1937-41 - The Chronological (Classics 628, 1990)
- 1944-47 - The Chronological (Classics 1067, 1990)
- 1957.07 - Red Allen, feat. Kid Ory & Jack Teagarden at Newport (Verve, 1957)
- 1957.03 - Ride, Red, Ride in Hi-Fi (RCA Victor, 1957) reissued as World on a String (RCA, 1991)
- 1957.05 - Dixiecats (Roulette, 1957)
- 1957 - Stormy Weather (Jazz Groove, ?)
- 1957.12 - Warhorses (Jass Records, 1987CD version) with Coleman Hawkins
- 1958 - High Standards, (Jass Records, 1987CD version) with Coleman Hawkins
- 1960.11 - Plays King Oliver (Verve, ?)
- 1960.11 - Stuyvesant Casino Nights (Stycon, ?)
- 1961.09 - Live at the London House (Fanfare, ?)
- 1962.03 - Rare Red Allen Trio performances (Flutegroove, ?)
- 1962.06 - Mr. Allen (Swingville, 1962)
- 1963 - Nice! (Phoenix, ?)
- 1965.06 - Feeling Good (Columbia, ?)
- 1967 - with the Alex Welsh Band (Jazzology, ?)
- 1968 - The College Concert (Impulse!, 1968) with Pee Wee Russell

with the Fletcher Henderson Orchestra

- 1932-34 - The Chronological (Classics 535, ?)
- 1934-37 - The Chronological (Classics 527, ?) HRA only in the first four tracks

with the Luis Russell Orchestra

- 1926-29 - The Chronological (Classics 588, 1991) HRA in the ten tracks of 1929
- 1930-34 - The Chronological (Classics 606, 1991) in all the tracks except the last six

with the Mills Blue Rhythm Band

- 1934-36 - The Chronological (Classics, ?)
- 1936-37 - The Chronological (Classics, ?) HRA in the 14 tracks of 1936

With Langston Hughes

- Weary Blues (MGM, 1959)
