= Peter Bocage =

American jazz trumpeter and violinist (1887–1967)

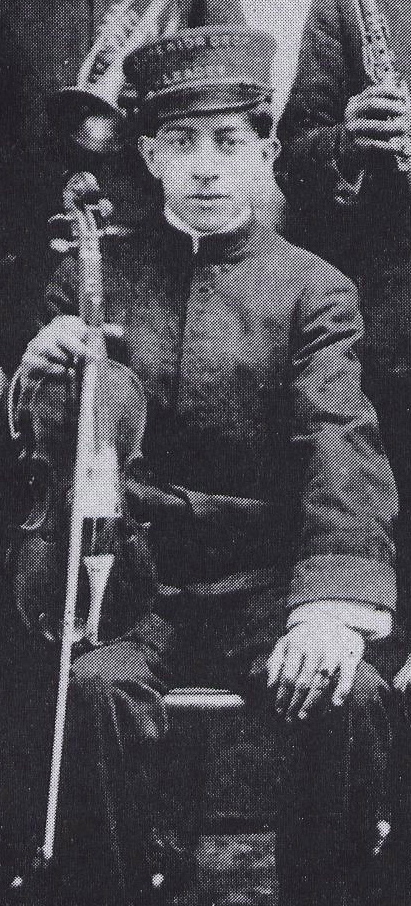
- Peter Bocage in 1910

Background information
- Birth name: Peter Edwin Bocage
- Born: July 31, 1887; New Orleans, Louisiana, U.S.
- Died: December 3, 1967 (aged 80); New Orleans
- Genres: Jazz
- Occupation: Musician
- Instrument(s): Trumpet, violin
- Formerly of: Onward Brass Band, Excelsior Brass Band

Peter Edwin Bocage (31 July 1887 – 3 December 1967) was an American jazz trumpeter and violinist.

== Career ==
At 21, he played violin as the leader of a ragtime band, the Superior Orchestra, which included Bunk Johnson. He played trumpet in the Tuxedo Orchestra, the Onward Brass Band, and as the leader of the Excelsior Brass Band. He played with King Oliver's band, the Fate Marable Orchestra, and A. J. Piron. He performed with Sidney Bechet and at the Cotton Club in New York City. He made records with Piron's New Orleans Orchestra in 1923, and later with his band the Creole Serenaders. He also taught Louis Armstrong how to read music notes. Both jazz musicians met during 'jam sessions' and created a friendship through music. In later years he performed at Preservation Hall in New Orleans.
