= Waldren Joseph =

American jazz musician

- Also known as: Frog Joseph
- Born: September 12, 1918; New Orleans, Louisiana, U.S.
- Died: September 19, 2004 (aged 86) New Orleans, Louisiana, U.S.
- Genres: Jazz
- Instruments: Trombone
- Children: 7, including Charles and Kirk

Waldren "Frog" Joseph (September 12, 1918 – September 19, 2004) was an American jazz trombone player from New Orleans, Louisiana.

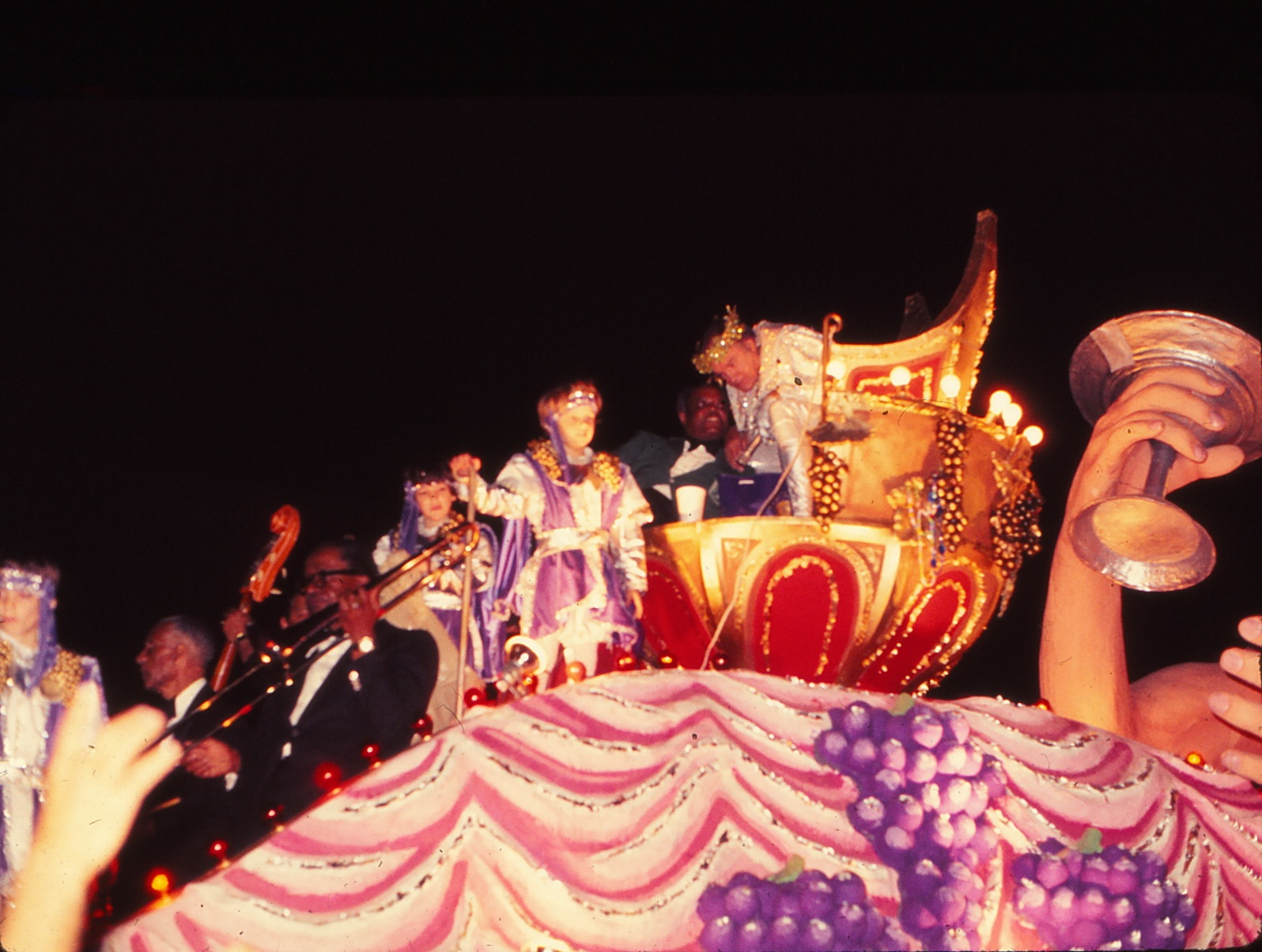
Frog Joseph on trombone on Krewe of Bacchus king's float for 1973 New Orleans Mardi Gras season.

== Career ==
Joseph played in a variety of styles over his career but was best known as a performer of traditional New Orleans jazz, a style carried by Preservation Hall ensembles. His first job as a teenager was playing piano, double bass, and trombone on an excursion boat on Lake Pontchartrain, and he went on to tour with a range of musicians including Joe Robichaux, Sidney Desvigne, and Lee Allen. Joseph also recorded with R&B artists such as Big Joe Turner, Earl King, Smiley Lewis, and Dave Bartholomew. In the traditional vein, he recorded and toured with New Orleans bandleaders like Paul Barbarin, Louis Cottrell, Jr., and Papa French. Late in his life he was a member of the Original Camelia Band led by trumpeter Clive Wilson.

== Personal life ==
Joseph was the father of seven children, including sousaphone player Kirk Joseph and trombonist Charles Joseph.
