= Fate Marable =

American jazz pianist and bandleader (1890–1947)

- Born: Fate Clifford Marable; December 2, 1890; Paducah, Kentucky
- Origin: Paducah, Kentucky, U.S.
- Died: January 16, 1947 (aged 56) St. Louis, Missouri, U.S.
- Genre: Jazz
- Occupations: Bandleader, musician
- Instruments: Piano, calliope
- Years active: 1907-1940

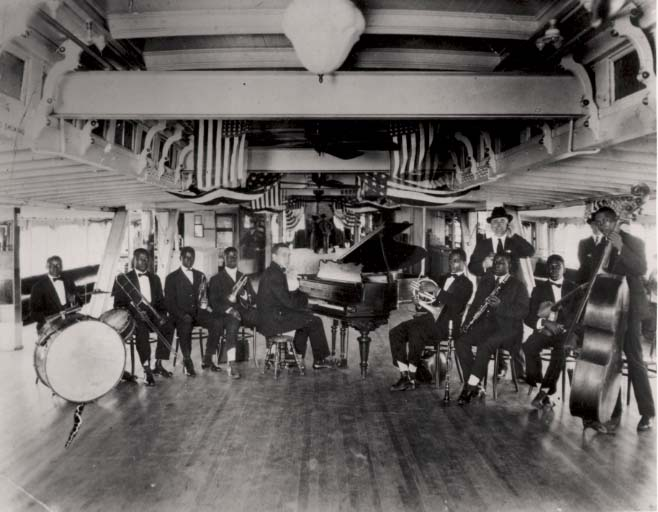
Fate Marable's New Orleans Band on the S. S. Sidney.jpg

Fate Marable (December 2, 1890 – January 16, 1947) was an American jazz pianist and bandleader.

== Early life ==
Marable was born in Paducah, Kentucky to James and Elizabeth Lillian (Wharton) Marable, a piano teacher. Fate had five siblings, including two brothers, Harold and James, and three sisters, Mabel, Juanita, and Neona. Elizabeth Marable, known as "Lizzie," gave her son music lessons, both in reading music and playing piano.

== Music career ==
At the age of 16, Marable began playing on the steam boats plying the Mississippi River. John and Joseph Streckfus hired him to replace their piano player, Charles Mills, who had accepted an engagement in New York City. There was a catch: Marable's responsibilities would include playing a large steam calliope. Steam streamed through the brass pipes and whistles at 80 pounds of pressure, the keys were hot and they were hard to hold down. Pitch varied with steam pressure, so there was a challenge of playing in tune. The calliope was designed to be clearly heard on shore, so the volume was overwhelming to the musician who was manipulating it. To prepare himself for playing the loud machine that spewed steam and water, Marable wore gloves, stuffed his ears with cotton, and donned raingear.

Later in 1907, he became bandleader for a paddlewheeler on the Streckfus Line running between New Orleans, Louisiana and St. Paul, Minnesota, a position he retained for 33 years. Later, he spent late nights in New Orleans' clubs scouting for talent and playing at jam sessions. There he discovered Louis Armstrong blowing cornet, and recruited him to play for his band on evening riverboat excursions cruising around the Crescent City.

As a bandleader, Marable shared the lessons from his mother with his musicians. Many of the musicians he hired played by ear, and he augmented their skills by teaching them to read music, and expected them all to learn how to play from sheet music on sight. As his one-time drummer, Zutty Singleton put it: "There was a saying in New Orleans. When some musician would get a job on the riverboats with Fate Marable, they'd say, 'Well, you're going to the conservatory.'" While he was training these musicians to better perform the dance arrangements for the steamboat passengers, he also boosted many of their careers when they were ready to move on. Streckfus Steamers' alumni went on to play with bandleaders such as Cab Calloway, Count Basie, Duke Ellington, Jimmie Lunceford, Fats Waller, and Chick Webb.

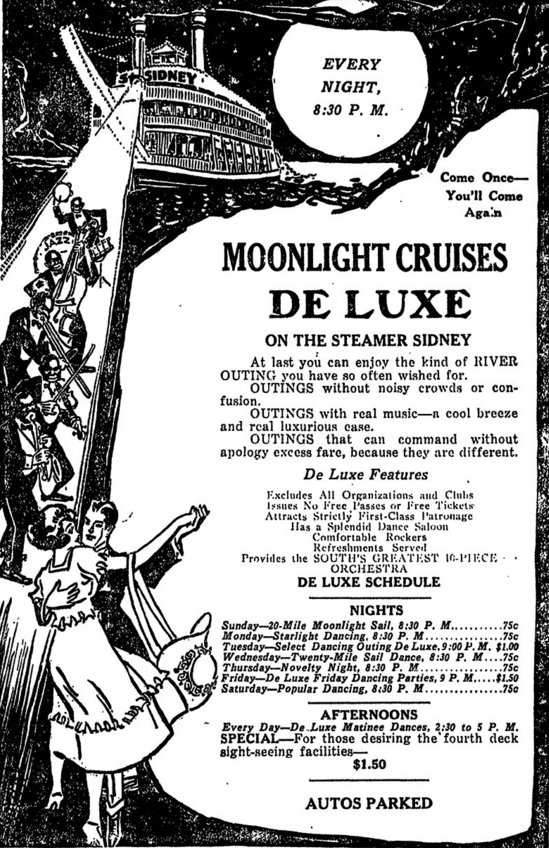
1920 advertisement for "Moonlight Cruises De Luxe" on a steamer at New Orleans which featured Marable's band.

Members of Marable's bands were expected to be able to play a wide variety of music, from hot numbers to light classics, playing by memory or ear, and from sheet music. Above all they were expected to keep the dancers happy. Marable was a strict bandleader, demanding musical proficiency and rigid discipline from all his bandmembers, yet allowing them to develop their individual strong points. For instance, Louis Armstrong's gift for improvisation was recognised as such by Marable, and he allowed him to improvise his breaks rather than play them note for note. Marable's band served as an early musical education for many other players who would later become prominent in jazz, including Red Allen, Baby Dodds, Johnny Dodds, Pops Foster, Erroll Garner, Narvin Kimball, Al Morgan, Jimmy Blanton, Elbert Pee Wee Claybrook, Joe Poston, and Zutty Singleton.

In 1916, Marable published the only original composition of his career, Barrell House Rag, co-written with Clarence Williams.

A young George Russell, later the deviser of the Lydian Concept, grew up listening to Marable's music.

== Death ==
Fate Marable died of pneumonia in St. Louis, Missouri. He was 56 years old. He is buried in Oak Grove Cemetery in Paducah, Kentucky.
