= Sam Morgan (musician) =

American jazz trumpeter (1887–1936)

Sam Morgan (December 18, 1887 – February 25, 1936) was an American New Orleans–based jazz trumpet player and bandleader.

He was born in Bertrandville, Louisiana, United States. Sidemen in the band included brothers Isaiah and Andrew Morgan on trumpet and tenor sax, respectively, Earl Fouché on alto sax and Jim Robinson on trombone. Robinson's cousin Sidney Brown (aka Little Jim or Jim Little) was the bassist, and George Guesnon was Morgan's banjoist from 1930 to 1935. The "Young Morgan Band" as it was commonly called by fans of the day, was one of the most popular territory bands touring the Gulf Coast circuit (Galveston, Texas to Pensacola, Florida).

Sam Morgan died in New Orleans in February 1936, at the age of 48.

== Reissues ==
Columbia Special Products, a division of Columbia Records, produced in 1964 a three record set, Jazz Odyssey, Volume 1: The Sound of New Orleans (1917–1947). The music of "Sam Morgan's Jazz Band", recorded in 1927 with Morgan on cornet, comprised all of the sixth side. The tracks were: "Steppin' on the Gas"; "Everybody's Talkin'"; "Mobile Stomp"; "Sing On"; "Short Dress Gal"; "Bogalusa Strut"; "Down by the Riverside"; and "Over in Gloryland". These eight 78 rpm sides are Morgan's entire recorded legacy.
