= Louis Barbarin =

American jazz drummer (1902–1997)

Louis Barbarin (nickname Lil Barb; October 24, 1902 – May 12, 1997) was a New Orleans jazz drummer.

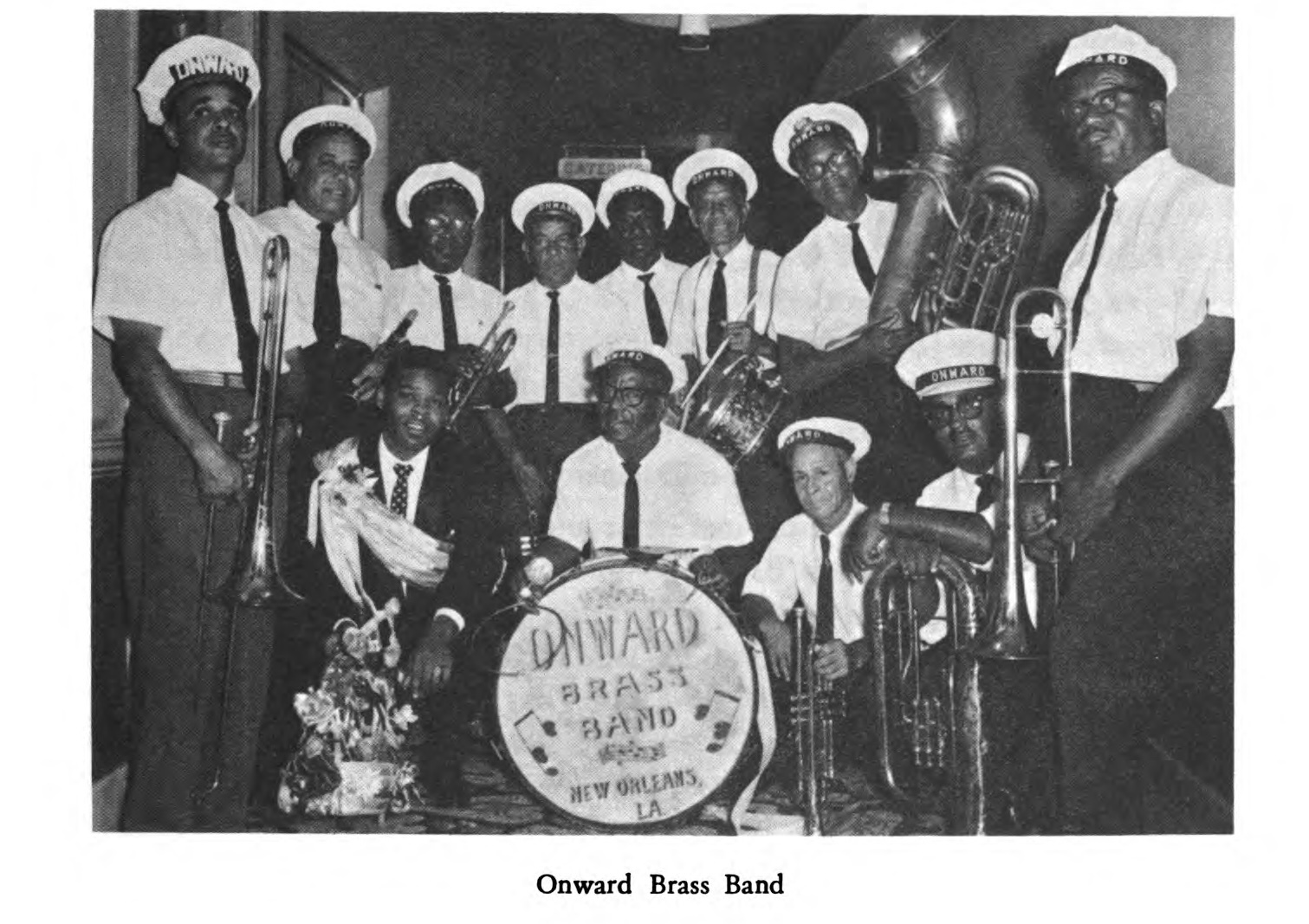
Onward Brass Band, 1965. Louis Barbarin holds snare drum, to upper right of his brother Paul Barbarin seated at center

== Early life ==
Barbarin was born in New Orleans on October 24, 1902. His father was Isidore Barbarin, and his brothers Paul, Lucien, and William all became musicians. He studied under the drummer Louis Cottrell, Sr.

== Later life and career ==
Barbarin "joined the first Onward Brass Band around 1918, when Manuel Perez was the leader. He played at dances with Kid Rena, the trombonist Jack Carey, and Punch Miller, and on excursion boats with Sidney Desvigne." He joined Papa Celestin's band in 1937 and stayed until Celestin's death. The band was then taken over by banjoist Albert French, and Barbarin remained as the drummer. He often recorded with each of the bands.

Barbarin sang in a quartet, the Four Tones, after World War II, then worked with Miller in the 1950s and 1960s. He played in several bands in the mid-to-late 1960s, and toured extensively in the 1970s, including in Europe. He stopped playing in 1982, and died in New Orleans on May 12, 1997. He was interred at Mount Olivet Cemetery in New Orleans.

== Personal life ==
Barbarin was Catholic.
