= Excelsior Brass Band =

- Origin: New Orleans, Louisiana, United States
- Genres: Brass band
- Years active: 1879–1931
- Past members: Théogène Baquet; George Moret; Peter Bocage; John Robichaux; George Baquet; Alphonse Picou; Luis Tio; Lorenzo Tio Sr.; Honore Dutrey; Sam Dutrey Sr.; Isidore Barbarin; Albert Snaer; Louis Cottrell Sr.; Willie Humphrey

The Excelsior Brass Band was a brass band from New Orleans active between 1879 and 1931. It was one of the earliest recognized brass bands on the New Orleans jazz scene.

The Excelsior was founded in 1879 by Théogène Baquet, who led it until 1904; following this it was led by George Moret (1904-1922) and then Peter Bocage, who led it from 1922 until its dissolution in 1931. The band typically held ten to twelve members, including three cornets or trumpets, two trombones, two clarinets, an alto horn, a baritone horn, a tuba, a snare drum, and a bass drum. Their repertory included marches, dance pieces, dirges, and hymns. Among its members were John Robichaux, George Baquet, Alphonse Picou, Luis Tio (Lorenzo Tio's uncle), Lorenzo Tio Sr. (Lorenzo Tio's father), Honore Dutrey, Sam Dutrey Sr. (Sam Dutrey's father), Isidore Barbarin, Albert Snaer, Louis Cottrell Sr., and Willie Humphrey.
