= John Robichaux =

American jazz bandleader, drummer, and violinist (1866–1939)

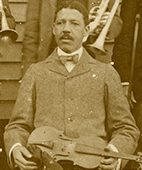

Background information
- Born: January 16, 1866; Thibodaux, Louisiana, United States
- Died: 1939 (aged 72–73) New Orleans, Louisiana, United States
- Genres: Jazz
- Occupations: Bandleader, drummer, and violinist

John Robichaux (January 16, 1866 – 1939) was an American jazz bandleader, drummer, and violinist. He was the uncle of Joseph Robichaux.

== Career ==
He was born in Thibodaux, Louisiana, United States to a Catholic family, on January 16, 1866. So he was raised Catholic. John Robichaux moved to New Orleans in 1891, where he was the bass drummer for the Excelsior Brass Band from 1892 to 1903. During this time he also worked as a bandleader, playing violin in his own ensembles from 1893 until the time of his death.

Among the ensembles he led was a 36-piece orchestra in 1913. Robichaux's bands were respected in his day and included many of the city's best musicians, such as Bud Scott, Lorenzo Tio, and Manuel Perez. He wrote over 350 songs and wrote many orchestral arrangements, which are now kept at the William Ransom Hogan Jazz Archive located at Tulane University.
