= Alvin Alcorn =

American jazz trumpeter (1912–2003)

- Born: Alvin Elmore Alcorn; September 7, 1912; New Orleans, Louisiana
- Died: July 10, 2003 (aged 90) New Orleans
- Genres: Jazz
- Occupation: Musician
- Instrument: Trumpet
- Years active: 1932–1990
- Formerly of: Kid Ory, Olympia Brass Band

Alvin Elmore Alcorn (September 7, 1912 – July 10, 2003) was an American jazz trumpeter.

== Career ==
Alcorn learned music theory from his brother. In the early 1930s, he was a member of the Sunny South Syncopators led by Armand J. Piron. He worked in Texas as a member of Don Albert's swing band, but he spent most his career in New Orleans in the dixieland bands of Paul Barbarin, Sidney Desvigne, Oscar Celestin, and Octave Crosby.

During the 1950s, he went to Los Angeles to join the band of Kid Ory, then a couple years later returned to New Orleans. He went on tour in Europe with Chris Barber in the late 1970s and continued to perform into the 1980s.
