= Paul Barbarin =

American jazz drummer (1899–1969)

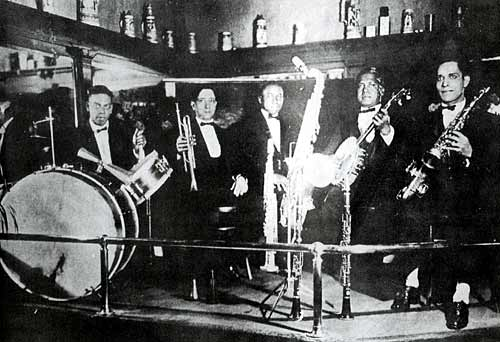
- Barbarin, left, plays drums with a band on Rampart Street in New Orleans, 1919. Also pictured are (left to right): Arnold Metoyer, trumpet; Luis Russel, piano; Willie Santiago, banjo; Albert Nicholas, saxophones and clarinet.

Background information
- Born: Adolphe Paul Barbarin; May 5, 1899; New Orleans, Louisiana, U.S.
- Died: February 17, 1969 (aged 69) New Orleans
- Genres: Jazz
- Occupations: Musician, composer
- Instrument: Drums

Adolphe Paul Barbarin (May 5, 1899 – February 17, 1969) was an American jazz drummer from New Orleans.

== Career ==
Barbarin grew up in New Orleans in a family of musicians, including his father Isidore, three of his brothers (including Louis), and his nephew (Danny Barker). He was a member of the Silver Leaf Orchestra and the Young Olympia Band. He moved to Chicago in 1917 and worked with Freddie Keppard and Jimmie Noone. From 1925–1927, he was a member of King Oliver's band.

During the following year, he moved to New York City and played in Luis Russell's band for about four years. He left Russell and worked as a freelance musician, but he returned to Russell's band when it supported Louis Armstrong. For a brief time beginning in 1942, he worked for Red Allen's sextet, with Sidney Bechet in 1944 and Art Hodes in 1953. In 1955, he founded the Onward Brass Band in New Orleans. He spent the rest of his life as the leader of that band.

Barbarin died on February 17, 1969, while playing snare drums during a Mardi Gras parade. Record producer Al Rose said that his funeral "attracted one of the great mobs in New Orleans funeral history."

== Personal life ==
Barbarin was Catholic.
