= Sidney Desvigne =

American jazz trumpeter (1893–1959)

Sidney Desvigne (September 11, 1893 – December 2, 1959) was an American jazz trumpeter.

He played in a large number of noted 1910s and 1920s-era New Orleans Jazz ensembles, including Leonard Bechet's Silver Bell Band, the Maple Leaf Orchestra, and the Excelsior Brass Band. He also played in Ed Allen's Whispering Gold Band on the Capitol, and later led his own band on the same riverboat.

== Career ==
Desvigne started his career with Fate Marable on the Steamer Capitol, playing with him for several years on the Mississippi River and also in St. Louis before forming his own band. In 1927 he formed Sidney Desvigne's Southern Syncopators, playing at St. Bernard's Country Club and on the riverboat Island Queen; among his sidemen were Red Allen, Pops Foster, and Al Morgan.

He attempted to create a New Orleans big band in the 1930s, hoping to capitalize on the swing jazz craze.

In the 1940s, New Orleans press called his orchestra "the South's No. 1 Hepcats". During World War II, they were the city's most popular dance band, playing regular gigs at the Gypsy Tea Room on Saturday and Sunday nights, which frequently featured a Battle of the Bands. The winner of their battle with the dance band from Algiers Naval Station, performing as the Gobs of Rhythm, was not announced in the press.

In 1945, he left New Orleans and opened a club in Southern California. He died in 1959.

== Personal life ==
Desvigne was Catholic.
