= Papa Celestin =

American jazz bandleader, trumpeter, cornetist and vocalist (1884–1954)

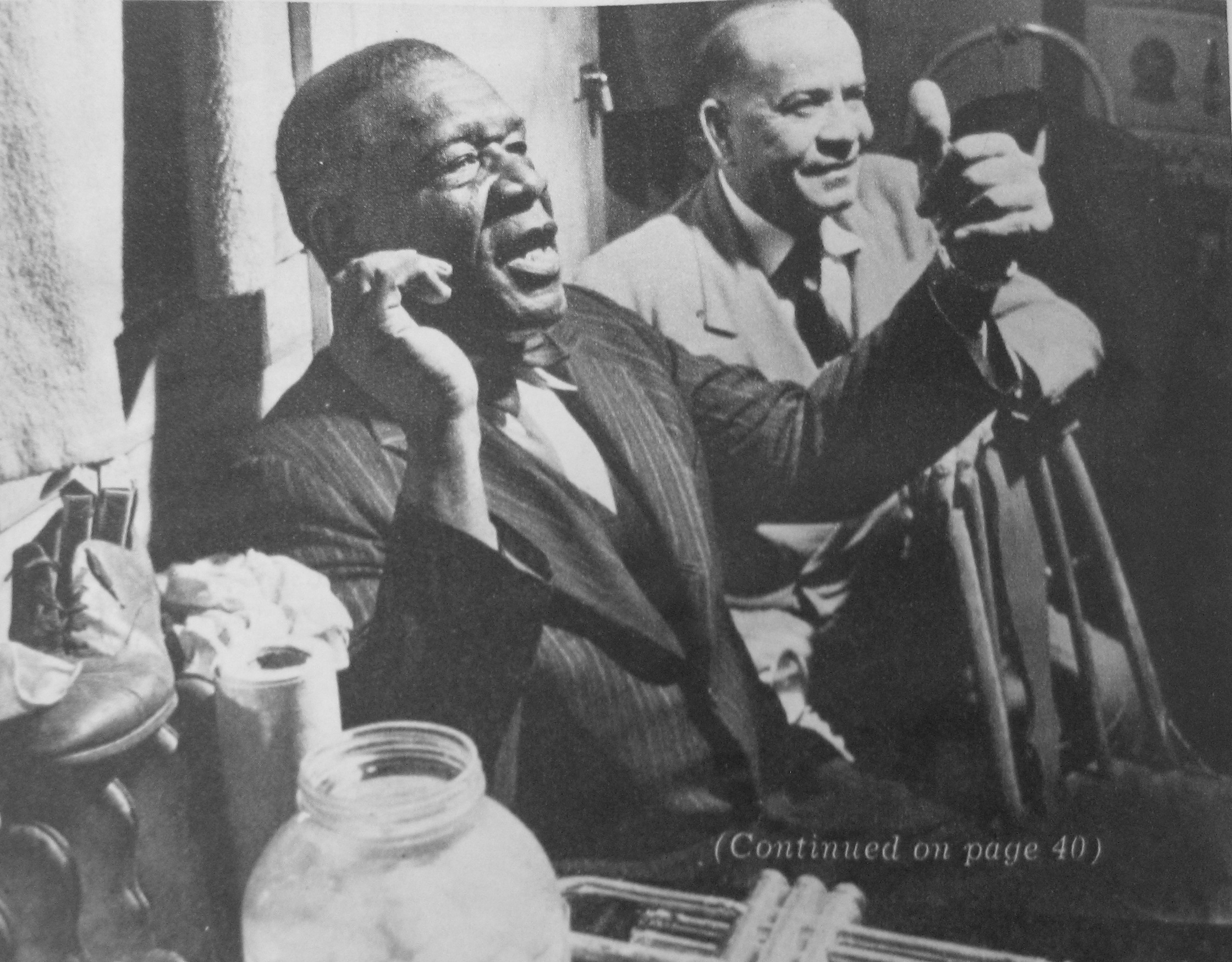
- Papa Celestin (foreground) with Alphonse Picou. Photo by Stanley Kubrick, 1950

Background information
- Born: Oscar Phillip Celestin; January 1, 1884; Napoleonville, Louisiana, U.S.
- Died: December 15, 1954 (aged 70) New Orleans, Louisiana
- Genres: Jazz, Dixieland
- Occupations: Musician, bandleader
- Instrument: Trumpet
- Years active: 1910–1953
- Labels: Okeh, Columbia, Southland
- Formerly of: Tuxedo Brass Band Algiers Brass Band

Oscar Phillip Celestin (January 1, 1884 – December 15, 1954), better known by his stage name Papa Celestin, was an American jazz trumpeter and bandleader.

== Life and career ==
Celestin was born in Napoleonville, Louisiana, to a Creole family, son of a sugar-cane cutter. In his youth he worked on rural Louisiana plantations. Eager for a better life, he worked as a cook for the Texas and Pacific Railway, saved up money and bought used musical instruments. He played guitar and trombone before deciding on cornet as his main instrument. He took music lessons from Claiborne Williams, who traveled down the Bayou Lafourche from Donaldsonville. He would later relocate to New Orleans as a teenager, settling in the Algiers neighborhood. In Algiers, he played cornet with the Algiers Brass Band and Red Allen's Excelsior Brass Band. About 1910, he gained a job as leader of the house band at the Tuxedo Dance Hall on North Franklin St. on the edge of Storyville.

For years, Celestin co-led the Tuxedo Brass Band with trombonist William Ridgely. They made their first recordings with the band during the Okeh Records field trip to New Orleans in 1925. After Ridgely and Celestin had a falling out, they led competing "Tuxedo" bands for about five years. Celestin's Original Tuxedo Orchestra made a series of recordings for Columbia Records in the 1920s. Celestin also led the Tuxedo Brass Band, one of the top brass bands in the city. Playing in the Original Tuxedo Orchestra with Celestin over the years were such notables as trombonist Bill Mathews, pianist Octave Crosby, drummer Christopher Goldston, cornetist Joe Oliver, trumpeter Mutt Carey, clarinetist Alphonse Picou, bassist Ricard Alexis and trumpeter Louis Armstrong.

In 1932 Celestin was forced out of the music business by the impact of the Great Depression. He worked in a shipyard until he was able to form a new band after World War II. The new Tuxedo Brass Band proved tremendously popular and was hailed as a key New Orleans tourist attraction. In 1953, Papa Celestin was filmed leading his band for the travelogue Cinerama Holiday (released in 1955). His band became a regular feature at the Paddock Lounge on Bourbon Street in the French Quarter, and made regular radio broadcasts, television appearances, and more recordings. In 1953 Celestin gave a command performance for President Eisenhower at the White House. His last recording was "Marie LaVeau" (1954), on which he sang.

In view of the contribution Celestin made in jazz throughout his lifetime, the Jazz Foundation of New Orleans had a bust made and donated to the Delgado Museum in New Orleans. Near the end of his life, he was honored as one of the greats of New Orleans music. 4,000 people marched in his funeral parade when he died in 1954. After his death, Tuxedo Brass Band leadership was briefly taken over by trombonist Eddie Pierson until his death in 1958. The leadership of the band then fell to banjo player Albert "Papa" French.

== Selective discography ==
Celestin recorded for Okeh in 1925, then for Columbia for the rest of the decade. He resumed recording in his final decade. A number of air-checks from Celestin's radio broadcasts have also been issued commercially.

Year	Title	Genre	Label
1994 reissue	Marie Laveau	Jazz	GHB
1950	The Battle of the Bands	Jazz	Fairmont
1955	Papa Celestin's Golden Wedding	Jazz	Southland
