= Creoles of color =

United States ethnic group originating from Louisiana

Creoles of color Gens de couleur Mounn koulè Criollos de color
Total population
- Indeterminable

Regions with significant populations
- New Orleans, Louisiana, Texas, Mississippi, Alabama, Maryland, Florida, Georgia, Memphis, Chicago, New York, Los Angeles and San Francisco

Languages
- English, French, Spanish and Louisiana Creole (Kouri-Vini)

Religion
- Predominantly Roman Catholic, Protestant; some practice Voodoo

Related ethnic groups
- African Americans, Cajuns, Louisiana Creole people, Isleños, Alabama Creole people, Québécois, Arkansas Creoles Peoples in Louisiana; African Americans in Louisiana; Isleños; Redbone; Other Métis; Acadians; French Americans; French-Canadian Americans; Cajuns; Native Americans; Caribbean Americans; Spanish Americans; Portuguese Americans; Afro Latino; Cuban Americans; Dominican Americans; Stateside Puerto Ricans; Canarian Americans; Mexican Americans; Italian Americans; German Americans; Irish Americans

The Creoles of color are a multiracial ethnic group of Louisiana Creoles that developed in the former French and Spanish colonies of Louisiana (especially in New Orleans), Mississippi, Arkansas, Alabama, and Northwestern Florida, in what is now the United States. French colonists in Louisiana first used the term "Creole" to refer to people born in the colony, rather than in Europe, thus drawing a distinction between Old-World Europeans and Africans from their descendants born in the New World. Today, many Creoles of color have assimilated into (and contributed to) Black American culture, while some retain their distinct identity as a subset within the broader African American ethnic group.

New Orleans Creoles of color have been named as a "vital source of U.S. national-indigenous culture." Creoles of color helped produce the historic cultural pattern of unique literature, art, music, architecture, and cuisine that is seen in New Orleans. The first black poetry works in the United States, such as Les Cenelles, were created by New Orleans Creoles of color. The centuries-old New Orleans Tribune was owned and operated by Creoles of color.

After the American Civil War, and Reconstruction, the city's black elite fought against informal segregation practices and Jim Crow laws. With Plessy v. Ferguson and the beginning of legal segregation in 1896, Creoles of color became disenfranchised in Louisiana and other southern states. Some moved to other states, sometimes passing into white groups as passé blanc, or integrating into Black groups. Creole of color artists, such as Sidney Bechet and Jelly Roll Morton, helped spread Jazz; and Allen Toussaint, the "beloved Creole gentleman", contributed to rhythm and blues.

Creoles of color who moved to other states founded diaspora communities, which were called "Little New Orleans", such as Little New Orleans, in Los Angeles and Little New Orleans, in Galveston.

== Historical context ==
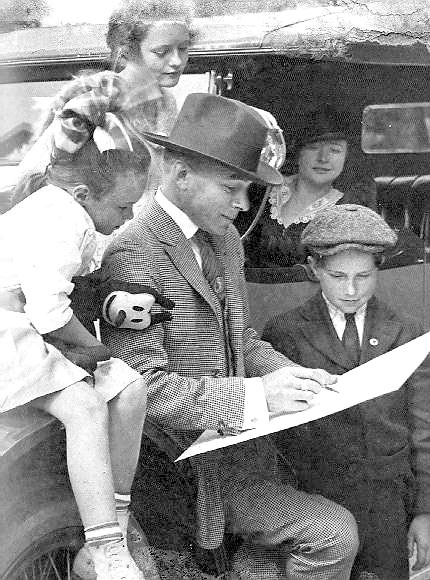
Creole cartoonist George Herriman

Créole is derived from Latin and means to "create", and was first used in the "New World" by the Portuguese to describe local goods and products. The Spanish later used the term during colonial occupation to mean any native-born inhabitant of the New World. French colonists used the term Créole to distinguish themselves from foreign-born settlers, and later as distinct from Anglo-American settlers.

Créole referred to people born in Louisiana whose ancestors came from other places. Colonial documents show that the term Créole was used variously at different times to refer to white people, mixed-race people, and black people, both free-born and enslaved. The addition of "-of color" was historically necessary when referring to Creoles of African and mixed ancestry, as the term "Creole" (Créole) did not convey any racial connotation until after the colonial period.

During French colonization, social order was divided into three distinct categories: Creole aristocrats (grands habitants); a prosperous, educated group of multi-racial Creoles of European, African and Native American descent (bourgeoisie); and the far larger class of African slaves and Creole peasants (petits habitants). French Law regulated interracial conduct within the colony. An example of such laws are the Louisiana Code Noir.

Though interracial relations were legally forbidden, or restricted, they were not uncommon. For a time, there were customs regulating relationships between white men and young women of African or mixed ancestry, whose mothers would negotiate the terms. These often included freedom for an enslaved woman and any children of the union, property settlement, and education. Mixed-race Creoles of color became identified as a distinct ethnic group, Gens de couleur libres (free persons of color), and were granted their free-person status by the Louisiana Supreme Court in 1810.

Social markers of creole identity have included being of Catholic faith, being a speaker of French and/or another French-derived language, having a strong work ethic, and being a fan of literature. Many may acquire Louisiana French or Louisiana Creole from familial exposure, but learn Standard French in school, particularly in Louisiana. There has been a revival of French after its systematic suppression for a period by Anglo-Americans. The approach to revitalization is somewhat controversial as many French Louisianians argue the prioritization of Standard French education deprioritizes Louisianisms.

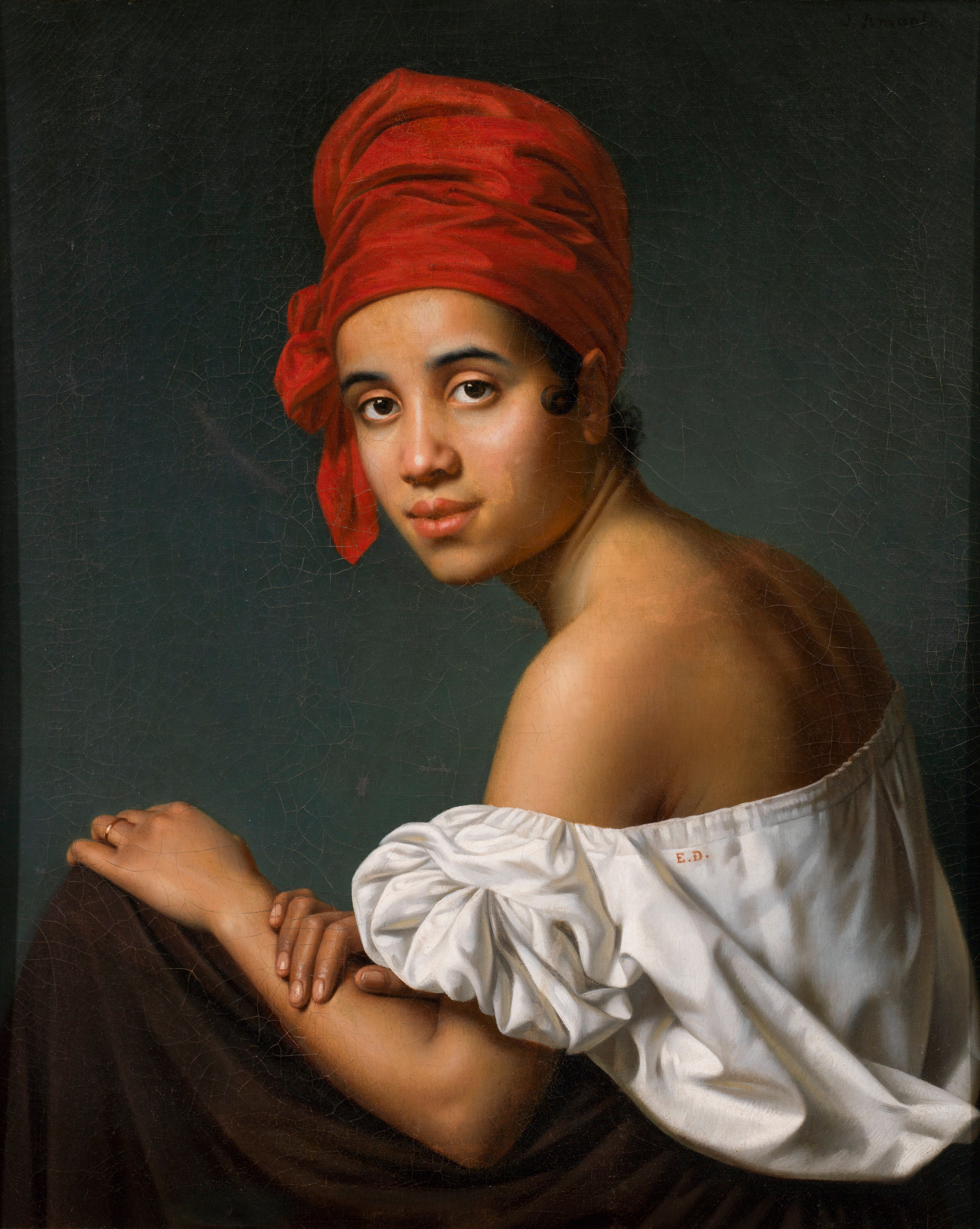
Portrait of a Creole woman in a red tignon c. 1840, painted by Jacques Amans

For many, being a descendant of the Gens de couleur libres is an identity marker specific to Creoles of color. Many Creoles of color were free-born, and their descendants often enjoyed many of the same privileges that whites did, including (but not limited to) property ownership, formal education, and service in the militia. During the antebellum period, their society was structured along class lines, and they tended to marry within their group. While it was not illegal, it was a social taboo for Creoles of color to marry slaves and it was a rare occurrence. Some of the wealthier and prosperous Creoles of color owned slaves themselves. Many did so to free and/or reunite with once-separated family members. Other Creoles of color, such as Thomy Lafon, used their social position to support the abolitionist cause.

Wealthy planter Francis E. Dumas, another Creole of color, emancipated all of his slaves in 1863. He organized them into a company in the Second Regiment of the Louisiana Native Guards, in which he served as an officer.

== Migration ==
=== First Wave ===
The first wave of creole migration out of Louisiana occurred between 1840 and 1890 with the majority of migrants fleeing to ethnic-dominant outskirts of larger U.S. cities and abroad where race was more fluid.

=== Second Wave ===
The reclassification of Creoles of color as black prompted the second migratory wave of Creoles of color between 1920 and 1940.

== Military ==
Creoles of color had been members of the militia for decades under both French and Spanish control of the colony of Louisiana. For example, around 80 free Creoles of color were recruited into the militia that participated in the Battle of Baton Rouge in 1779.

After the United States made the Louisiana Purchase in 1803 and acquired the large territory west of the Mississippi, the Creoles of color in New Orleans volunteered their services and pledged their loyalty to their new country. They also took an oath of loyalty to William C. C. Claiborne, the Louisiana Territorial Governor appointed by President Thomas Jefferson.

Months after the colony became part of the United States, Claiborne's administration was faced with a dilemma previously unknown in the U.S.; integration in the military by incorporating entire units of previously established "colored" militia. In a February 20, 1804, letter, Secretary of War Henry Dearborn wrote to Claiborne saying, "…it would be prudent not to increase the Corps, but to diminish, if it could be done without giving offense…" A decade later, the militia of color that remained volunteered to take up arms when the British began landing troops on American soil outside of New Orleans in December 1814. This was the commencement of the Battle of New Orleans.

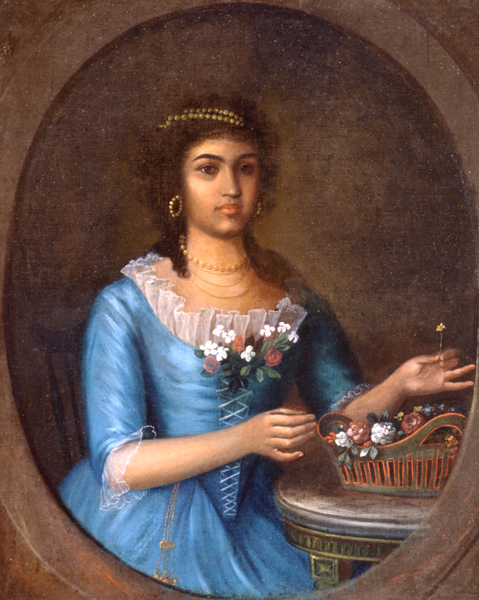
Portrait of Marianne Celeste Dragon in 1795, painted by José Francisco de Salazar y Mendoza.

A notable Creole family was that of Andrea Dimitry. Dimitry was a Greek immigrant who married Marianne Céleste Dragon, a woman of African and Greek ancestry, around 1799. Their son, Creole author and educator Alexander Dimitry, was the first person of color to represent the United States as Ambassador to Costa Rica and Nicaragua. He was also the first superintendent of schools in Louisiana.

Andrea Dimitry's children were upper-class elite Creole. They were mostly educated at Georgetown University. One of his daughters married into the English royal House of Stuart. Some Creoles served as prominent members of the Confederate Government during the American Civil War.

== Activism ==
With the advantage of having been better educated than the new freedmen, many Creoles of color were active in the struggle for civil rights and served in political office during Reconstruction, helping to bring freedmen into the political system.

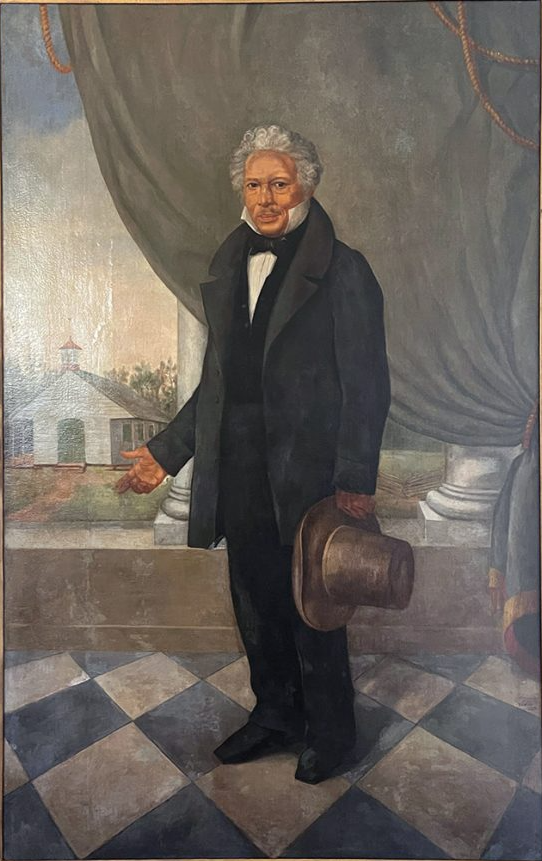
Nicholas Augustin Metoyer, son of Marie Thérèse Coincoin and founder of St. Augustine Catholic Church, 1836

During late Reconstruction, white Democrats regained political control of state legislatures across the former Confederate states by intimidation of blacks and other Republicans at the polls. Through the late nineteenth century, they worked to impose white supremacy under Jim Crow laws and customs. They disfranchised the majority of blacks, especially by creating barriers to voter registration through devices such as poll taxes, literacy tests, grandfather clauses, etc., stripping African Americans, including Creoles of color, of political power.

Creoles of color were among the African Americans who were limited when the U.S. Supreme Court ruled in the case of Plessy v. Ferguson in 1896, deciding that "separate but equal" accommodations were constitutional. It permitted states to impose Jim Crow rules on federal railways and later interstate buses.

On June 14, 2013, Louisiana Governor Bobby Jindal signed into law Act 276, creating the "prestige" license plate stating "I'm Creole", in honor of the Creoles' contributions, culture, and heritage.

== Education ==
It was common for wealthy francophone gens de couleur to study in France, with some remaining there for the rest of their lives. Creoles of color were often homeschooled or enrolled in private schools. These private schools were often financed and staffed by affluent Creoles of color. For example, L'Institute Catholique was financed by Madame Marie Couvent with writers Armand Lanusse and Joanni Questy serving as educators.

In 1850 it was determined that 80% of all gens de couleur libres were literate; a figure significantly higher than the white population of Louisiana at the time.

== Contribution to the arts ==
=== Literature ===
During the antebellum period, well-educated francophone gens de couleur libres contributed extensively to literary collections, such as Les Cenelles. A significant portion of these works were dedicated to describing the conditions of their enslaved compatriots. One example of such texts is the short story "Le Mulatre (The Mulatto)" by Victor Séjour, a Creole of color who lived and worked in Paris for most of his adult life. Other themes approached aspects of love, and religion, and many texts were likened to French romanticism. In daily newspapers locally and abroad, pieces written by Creoles of color were prominent. Even during the ban on racial commentary during the antebellum period, pieces written by these creoles reformulated existing French themes to subtly critique race relations in Louisiana. They still gained popularity among all readers.

=== Music ===
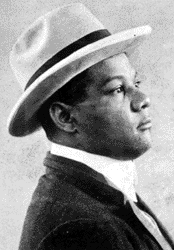
Creole jazz musician Sidney Bechet, a virtuoso on the soprano saxophone

Some Creoles of color trained as classical musicians in 19th-century Louisiana. These musicians would often study with those associated with the French Opera House; some traveled to Paris to complete their studies. Creole composers of that time are discussed in Music and Some Highly Musical People by James Monroe Trotter, and Nos Hommes et Notre Histoire by Rodolphe Lucien Desdunes.

=== Notable classical Creole musicians ===
- Basile Barès
- Edmond Dédé
- Laurent Dubuclet
- Charles Lucien Lambert
- Sidney Lambert
- Victor-Eugene McCarty
- Samuel Snaër

==== Jazz musicians ====
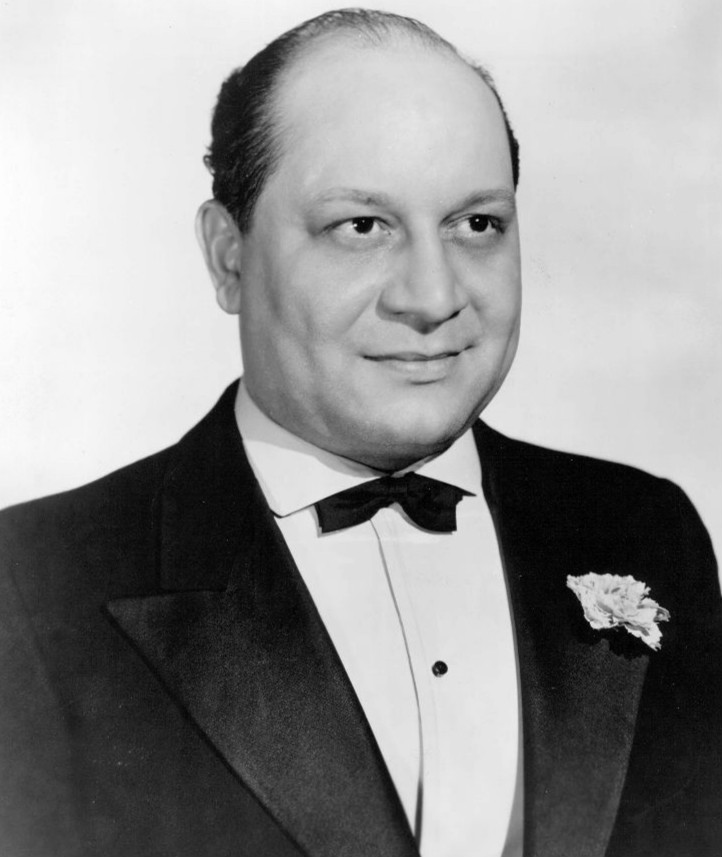
Barney Bigard, noted jazz clarinetist long a part of Duke Ellington's orchestra

Creoles of color from the New Orleans area were active in defining the earliest days of jazz. Some of the most notable names:

- Vernel Fournier
- George Baquet
- Paul Barbarin
- Louis Barbarin
- Danny Barker
- Emile Barnes
- Paul Barnes
- Sidney Bechet
- Barney Bigard
- Louis Cottrell, Sr.
- Louis Cottrell, Jr.
- Joe Darensbourg
- Louis Nelson Delisle
- Cie Frazier
- Illinois Jacquet
- Freddie Keppard
- Lawrence Marrero
- Jelly Roll Morton (Ferdinand J. LaMothe)
- Albert Nicholas
- Kid Ory
- Manuel Perez
- Jimmy Palao
- Alcide Pavageau
- Alphonse Picou
- De De Pierce
- Armand J. Piron
- John Robichaux
- Omer Simeon
- Lorenzo Tio
- Eddie Bo

== See also ==
- Criollo people
- List of Louisiana Creoles
- Louisiana Creole people
- Free people of color
- Louisiana French
- Louisiana Creole
- Cane River Creole National Historical Park
- Melrose Plantation
- Faubourg Marigny
- Tremé
- Little New Orleans
- Frenchtown, Houston
- Magnolia Springs, Alabama
- Arkansas Creoles
