= The Eagle Band =

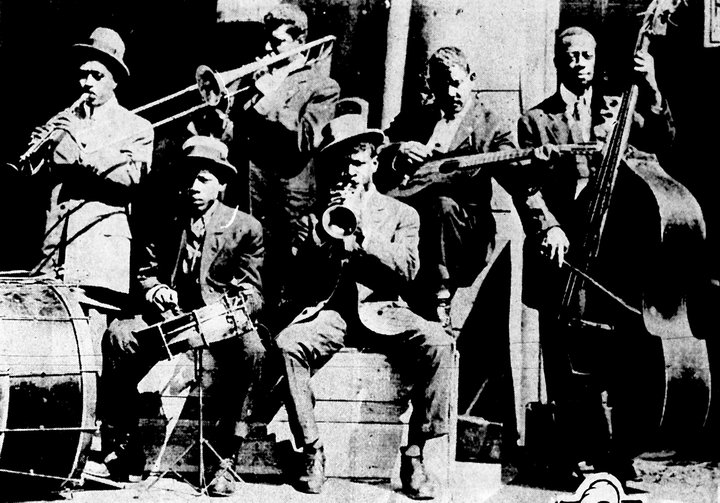
"The Eagle Band", South Rampart Street, New Orleans, February 1916. Big Eye Louis Nelson, clarinet; Frankie Duson, trombone; Chinee Foster, drums; Buddie Petit, cornet; Lorenzo Staultz, guitar; Dandy Lewis, string bass.

The Eagle Band was an American jazz band during the Ragtime and Early Jazz periods, (1895–1929) stationed in New Orleans, Louisiana. The instrumentation of the band was clarinet, drums, trombone, trumpet, guitar, and string bass, with one person on an instrument. The band was originally known as The Buddy Bolden Band, under the direction of Buddy Bolden from 1895–1906. On September 3, 1906, while playing in the Labor Day parade with his band, Buddy Bolden suffered a memorable breakdown, which included staggering out of marching formation and screaming. He was removed from the parade ranks and would permanently resign from the band.

After the resignation of Bolden, Frankie Dusen would be the one to lead the band, and change the name from The Buddy Bolden Band, to the Eagle Band, named after the Eagle Saloon on the corner of Perdido and Rampart Streets. The band maintained the popularity it had as The Buddy Bolden Band and primarily performed the same repertoire as before. Similar to the Hard Bop combo, Art Blakey and The Jazz Messengers, which would emerge in decades to come, The Eagle Band would serve as a stepping-stone for many prominent Hot Jazz players during the Early Jazz period. The Eagle Band was known as a very authentic, poignant band known for its ability to play slow gut-wrenching blues.

Members of the Band

Instrument	Artist
Clarinet	Sidney Bechet, Johnny Dodds, Frank Lewis, Big Eye Louis Nelson, Willie Parker, Lorenzo Tio Jr.
Trumpet	Peter Bocage, Tig Chambers, Edward Clem, Bunk Johnson, Joe Johnson, Frank Keelin, Freddie Keppard, King Oliver, John Penerton, Buddy Petit, Wild Ned
Trombone	Jack Carey, Frankie Dusen
Guitar	Richard Payne, Lorenzo Staulz, Cliff Stones
Bass	Pops Foster, Ed Garland, Bill Johnson, Dandy Lewis, Bob Lyons
Drums	Walter Brundy, Baby Dodds, Chinee Foster, Tubby Hall, Henry Zeno
