= Olympia Orchestra =

- Origin: New Orleans, Louisiana, United States
- Genres: Jazz
- Years active: c.1906–late 1910s
- Past members: Under Freddie Keppard: Joseph Petit; Alphonse Picou; Sidney Bechet; Louis Keppard; Ernest Trepagnier; Under A.J. Piron: King Oliver; Zue Robertson; Clarence Williams; Billy Marrero; John Lindsay; Louis Cottrell Sr.

The Olympia Orchestra was an American jazz dance band active in New Orleans from around 1906 into the late 1910s.

The Olympia Orchestra was founded by Freddie Keppard, and typically held between five and seven members. The instrumentation usually consisted of cornet, trombone, clarinet, guitar or banjo, piano, tuba or double bass, and drums. This group established Keppard's reputation as a cornetist; when he left the group in 1914, A.J. Piron became its leader, and he added King Oliver as the group's cornetist.

Under Keppard, the group's personnel included Joseph Petit, Alphonse Picou, Sidney Bechet, Louis Keppard and Ernest Trepagnier; under Piron, they included Zue Robertson, Clarence Williams, Billy Marrero (Lawrence Marrero's father), John Lindsay, and Louis Cottrell Sr.
