= Cie Frazier =

American jazz musician

Josiah "Cie" Frazier (February 23, 1904 – January 10, 1985) was an American jazz drummer.

Frazier studied drums under several New Orleans jazz musicians, including Louis Cottrell, Sr., James William “Red Happy” Bolton, and Face-O Woods. He joined the Golden Rule Band with cousin Lawrence Marrero in 1921, and played in Marrero's Young Tuxedo Orchestra in the 1920s. He recorded with Papa Celestin's Tuxedo Brass Band in 1927 and played with A.J. Piron and Sidney Desvigne in the late 1920s and early 1930s. During the Great Depression Frazier played in WPA bands and in Navy dance bands. In 1945, he recorded with Wooden Joe Nicholas, and worked in the 1950s with Celestin, Percy Humphrey, George Williams, and the Eureka Brass Band. He played in the Preservation Hall Jazz Band in the 1960s, working there into the 1980s, and recorded in his last few decades with Kid Howard, De De Burke, George Lewis, Emile Barnes, Captain John Handy, and Don Ewell. He appears in the Steve McQueen film The Cincinnati Kid and even drummed on one session for Helen Reddy.
