= Alex Bigard =

American jazz drummer (1898–1978)

Alexander Louis Bigard, Jr. (September 25, 1898, New Orleans – June 27, 1978, New Orleans) was an American jazz drummer. He was the brother of Barney Bigard and a cousin of Natty Dominique and A.J. Piron, and was involved for decades with the New Orleans jazz scene.

Bigard studied drums under Louis Cottrell, Sr., and played (sometimes with Cottrell) in A.J. Piron's band in the 1910s. He played with the Excelsior Brass Band and Maple Leaf Orchestra, as well as with Peter DuConge, Buddy Petit, and Chris Kelly in the late 1910s and early 1920s. He was a member of Sidney Desvigne's band in 1925, and soon after that with Kid Shots Madison; he worked with John Robichaux for much of the 1930s. In the mid-1940s he was in Kid Rena's band, then formed his own ensemble, the Mighty Four, in the 1950s.

During the Dixieland revival period of the 1960s, he was a regular at Preservation Hall, and performed or recorded with Harold Dejan, Kid Howard, Punch Miller, De De Pierce, Billie Pierce. He went deaf around 1967 and left active performance.
