= Louis Cottrell =

Louis Cottrell may refer to one of two noted jazz musicians:

- Louis Cottrell Sr. (1878–1927), drummer
- Louis Cottrell Jr. (1911–1978), reedist
