= Camelia Brass Band =

US musical group

The Camelia Brass Band (also in sit-down variation the Camelia Dance Orchestra) was a New Orleans-style brass band, founded by Wooden Joe Nicholas around 1917 or 1918 in New Orleans.

The Camelia Brass Band was named after a steamboat, the S.S. Camelia. The group generally featured about ten members, with trumpet, trombone, clarinet, tuba, snare drum, and bass drum. In some of its engagements it played in reduced numbers as a dance band, with six members on trumpet, trombone, clarinet, banjo, bass, and drums. The ensemble featured Buddy Petit, Joseph Petit, Alphonse Picou, Billy Marrero, and Lawrence Marrero as members.

In the 1920s, D'Jalma Thomas Garnier took leadership of the group, and thereafter made appearances both under its own name and under Ganier's name. The original spelling of the French Creole family name contains the "r": Garnier, and his descendants maintain that original spelling. For the sake of correct pronunciation, however, D'Jalma Garnier (Ganier) left out the "r" to facilitate the correct French pronunciation, which is used today whether there is an "r" in the name or not. Garnier is the grandfather of zydeco/Cajun musician, composer, and pedestrian scholar D'Jalma Garnier III.

D'Jalma Thomas Garnier, the bandleader, played trumpet, piano, and violin. He is rumored to have taught Louis Armstrong at the New Orleans Colored Waifs' Home.
