= Joseph Petit =

American jazz trombonist (1873 or 1880–1946)

Joseph Petit (1873 or 1880, in New Orleans – 1946, in New Orleans) was an American jazz trombonist. He was the stepfather of Buddy Petit, and played in many early New Orleans jazz groups.

Joseph Petit played in the Olympia Orchestra, the Camelia Brass Band, and the Terminal Brass Band early in the 20th century. He led his own group, the Security Orchestra, for a short time before World War I. He played with Sidney Bechet and King Oliver, in addition to a host of lesser-known New Orleans musicians such as Sheik-O, Buddy Luck, Arthur Ogle, Booker T. Glass, and Wooden Joe Nicholas, with whom he recorded in the group the Original Creole Stompers in 1945 for the American Music Records label. His only recordings were a few sides made at the urging of American Music's Bill Russell made after he had retired from music. While past his prime and out of practice when he recorded, his recordings confirm the basic "tailgate" style of New Orleans trombone dates back to Petit's generation.
