= Tuxedo Brass Band =

The Tuxedo Brass Band, sometimes called the Original Tuxedo Brass Band, was one of the most highly regarded brass bands of New Orleans, Louisiana in the 1910s and 1920s.

The band was led by Papa Celestin in around 1910. Many noted jazz greats were played in the band. The group never recorded (though the Original Tuxedo Jazz Band, a dance band using some of the same musicians, did record in the mid-1920s).

Personnel varied; as with most such New Orleans brass bands of the era; a group no larger than three trumpets or cornets, two trombones, one or two clarinets, alto horn, baritone horn, bass horn, snare drum, and bass drum considered sufficient for most jobs. The team of Papa Celestin playing a driving lead, Manuel Perez with sweet variations and Joe Oliver's hot bluesy counter melodies was remembered by many musicians of the era as the finest brass band trumpet team heard in the city.

Other notables who played in the band included Louis Armstrong, Peter Bocage, Mutt Carey, Louis Dumaine, Eddie Atkins, Harrison Barnes, Sunny Henry, Jim Robinson, John Casimir, Johnny Dodds, Jimmie Noone, Sweet Emma Barrett, Alphonse Picou, George Guesnon, Isidore Barbarin, Louis Keppard, Chinee Foster, Black Benny Williams, and Zutty Singleton.

A group of younger musicians formed the Young Tuxedo Brass Band, which is still in existence.

== Notes ==
- New Orleans Jazz: A Family Album by Al Rose and Edmond Souchon, Third Edition, Louisiana State University Press, 1984
