= Louis Cottrell Jr. =

American jazz clarinetist and tenor saxophonist (1911–1978)

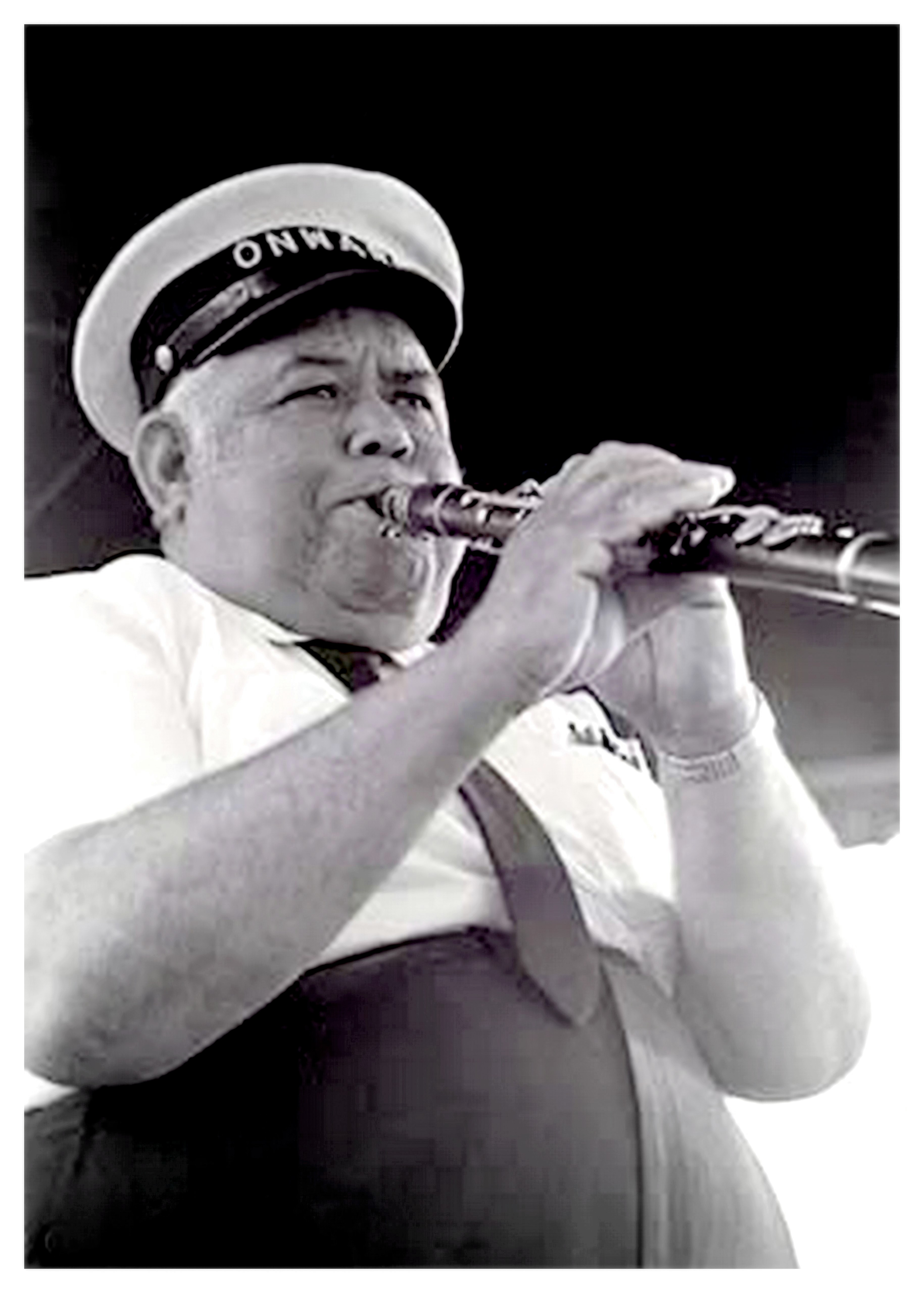
- Louis Cottrell

Background information
- Also known as: "Prez"
- Born: Louis Albert Cottrell Jr. March 7, 1911; New Orleans
- Died: March 21, 1978 (aged 67) New Orleans
- Genres: Traditional Jazz, Dixieland, New Orleans Jazz
- Occupations: Musician, bandleader, union leader
- Instruments: Clarinet, tenor saxophone
- Years active: c. 1925–1978
- Labels: Riverside, GHB, Southland
- Website: louiscottrell.com

Louis Albert Cottrell Jr. (March 7, 1911 – March 21, 1978) was a Louisiana Creole jazz clarinetist and tenor saxophonist. He was the son of the influential drummer Louis Cottrell, Sr., and grandfather of New Orleans jazz drummer Louis Cottrell III. As leader of the Heritage Hall Jazz Band, he performed at Carnegie Hall in 1974.

== Biography ==
Cottrell was born into an upper-class Creole musical family in New Orleans. His father, Louis "Old Man" Cottrell, Sr., was a famed drummer, and cornetist Manny Perez was his godfather. The young Cottrell grew up around such great musicians as Barney Bigard, John Robichaux, and A.J. Piron. Cottrell studied clarinet under Lorenzo Tio Jr. and Bigard. He began his career in the 1920s with the Golden Rule Orchestra, and then in 1925 played with Paul "Polo" Barnes.

Later in the 1920s he worked with Chris Kelly and Kid Rena, then in 1929 found work on the riverboat SS Island Queen with Lawrence Marrero's Young Tuxedo Brass Band and Sidney Desvigne. These were the years when he became a prominent union organizer. He joined Don Albert's orchestra soon after, recording an album with the orchestra in 1935 under the Vocalion label. He tried his hand at composing, and with Lloyd Glenn and Albert wrote, "You Don't Love Me (True)."

Rhythm and blues bandleader Paul Gayten would later approach Cottrell to record "You Don't Love Me" and it became one of the first hits of the R & B New Orleans era, having made it to the number 5 spot nationally on the R & B top ten charts. Cottrell toured widely throughout North America with Albert until 1939.

After leaving Albert he returned to New Orleans, playing with Paul Barbarin in 1940. They would form an enduring collaboration. He performed with A.J. Piron in 1941, then returned to play with Desvigne from 1942 to 1947. In the 1950s he played again with Barbarin, and recorded with him in 1951 and 1955.

Cottrell first recorded as a leader in 1961, when he formed the Louis Cottrell Trio to record for Riverside's "Living Legends" series. Barbarin and Cottrell in 1960 revived the Onward Brass Band. As a sideman he recorded with Peter Bocage (1960), Jim Robinson (1961–64), Harold Dejan (1962), Thomas Jefferson (1962), Paul Barbarin at Preservation Hall (1962), Sweet Emma Barrett (1963), Avery Kid Howard (1964), Waldren Joseph (1964–1965), Barbarin's Onward Brass Band (1968, 1968) and Paul "Polo" Barnes (1969). In 1967, Cottrell, went on a U.S.O. tour to entertain troops in Vietnam and Thailand. Cottrell took over the Onward Brass Band after Paul Barbarin's death in 1969.

He formed the Heritage Hall Jazz Band in 1971 and also led that ensemble up until his death. In its day, Heritage Hall rivaled the better known Preservation Hall, both located in the French Quarter. It was during this period in 1974 that the Heritage Hall Jazz Band, under Cottrell's leadership, played Carnegie Hall in New York City. Blanche Thomas was the featured vocalist. The recording of the live concert can be found on Viko. He made several television appearances, including Perry Como's Spring in New Orleans in 1976, and The Mike Douglas Show. He recorded "Big Lip Blues" on the Academy Award-nominated soundtrack "Pretty Baby" (1978), and had a cameo appearance in the film of the same name.

== Death ==
Louis Cottrell died suddenly at his home in New Orleans, after a short illness, in 1978, at the age of 67. Fittingly, he was honored with a jazz funeral, as thousands assembled in a small Gentilly Catholic church to bid him farewell.

Cottrell's grandson, Louis Cottrell III, became a drummer and performed with the Young Tuxedo Brass Band, Dr. Michael White and numerous other traditional jazz bands.

== Union activism ==
America throughout much of the 20th Century was a country which was racially divided. Chris Albertson, producer of the "Living Legends" series, recalls an incident in 1961 with a Black musician, McNeal Breaux, during recording of the "Living Legends" series in 1961: "[Breaux] owned a restaurant and invited Dave and me to have dinner there, but we had to enter through the back door, because of our color." Starting in his teens, Cottrell worked diligently to organize the Colored Musicians Union as a chapter of the American Federation of Musicians, Local 496. He would be elected president in 1956. He was as well known for seeking equitable treatment for musicians as for his music. Cottrell was able to see firsthand the fruits of his labor. Doug Ramsey wrote, "shortly before he died, [Cottrell] told a friend how happy he was that New Orleans had finally become a city where he and other musicians like him could make a living playing as they wanted to play.

== Musical style ==
Cottrell played traditional jazz, also referred to as Dixieland, the earliest form of jazz. It is distinguished by polymorphic improvisation by trumpet, trombone and clarinet. It has its origins in the marching bands of New Orleans which played at funerals. The main instruments of the bands, brass and woodwinds, would become the basic instruments of jazz. Cottrell's mastery of the clarinet and tenor saxophone enabled him to become a member of these bands and later lead his own. These brass bands were integral to the culture of the time. They performed at a wide variety of events, weddings, dances and most famously the jazz funeral. Rose of Sharon Witmer writes that the jazz funeral is a "living tradition carried on to this day and it owes a great debt to Louis Cottrell Jr."

Master clarinetist Lorenzo Tio Jr. taught Cottrell how to play the Albert system. The "Albert System" is a clarinet keying/fingering system. The Albert system of fingering requires the player to utilize "roller" keys to alternate between some notes on the instrument. The Albert system also generally has fewer keys than the more widely known "Boehm" fingering system. A fine example of his playing can be heard on Paul Barbarin's Onward Brass Band—in Concert. Cottrell leads the band during his favorite hymn, "What a Friend We Have in Jesus." His beautiful clarinet playing is a standout on the album.

== New Orleans: The Living Legends ==
In 1960-61 Riverside Records produced an acclaimed series of albums featuring jazz and blues greats such as Jim Robinson, Sweet Emma Barrett and Alberta Hunter. The objective was to record the music of veteran musicians before their artistry was lost forever. Many of the musicians were no longer active and their union memberships had expired. Recognizing the importance of the project, the American Federation of Musicians suspended the rules. This "Living Legends" series was initially recorded in New Orleans. Later sessions were recorded in Chicago. The sessions took place at Societé des Jeunes Amis Hall, built in the 1800s. According to the producer, Chris Albertson, the hall was a "Creole fraternal headquarters and it proved to have every advantage over a studio; apart from its live sound, it gave the performers familiar surroundings... The hall's acoustical sound was exactly what I wanted to recapture: the same kind of ambience that lent such character to Bill Russell's 1940's American Music recordings from San Jacinto Hall." One of the musicians invited to participate was Louis Cottrell Jr. Cottrell organized a trio comprising McNeal Breaux, Alcide "Slow Drag" Pavageau with Emanuel Sayles sitting in playing guitar and banjo. The band was so well received that they continued to play together. The music on this album has been described as "more polite and subtle than the city's 'downtown' music... an intimate, low-key delight." Cottrell's playing has also been well received:

[In 1961] Cottrell recorded a masterwork, entitled New Orleans: The Living Legends, which was reissued in 1994. To hear it is to conjure up the elegance of a bygone era by a man who did much to create it. From the opening note on "Bourbon Street Parade," to the charming "Three Little Words," to the reverent "What a Friend We Have in Jesus," the listener is hearing the living history of jazz.

== Discography ==
=== As leader ===
Year	Title	Label
1961	New Orleans: The Living Legends	Riverside
1963	Dixieland Hall Presents Louis Cottrell and His New Orleans Jazz Band	Nobility
1973	New Orleans Heritage Hall Jazz Band	GNP Crescendo
1974	Louis Cottrell's Heritage Hall Jazz Band Live at Carnegie Hall	Viko
1980	Louis Cottrell Quintet Hall Herb Quintet - Clarinet Legends	GHB

=== Other appearances ===
Year	Title	Label
1935	Boots And His Buddies / Don Albert & His Orchestra	Vocalion
1951	Paul Barbarin & His New Orleans Band – In Concert	504
1955	Paul Barbarin & His New Orleans Jazz Band – The Atlantic New Orleans Sessions	Mosaic
1960	Peter Bocage w. His Creole Serenaders & The Love Jiles Ragtime Orchestra	Riverside
1960	Peter Bocage & His Creole Serenaders – New Orleans: The Living Legends Peter Bocage	Riverside
1961	Jim Robinson And His New Orleans Band – New Orleans: The Living Legends Jim Robinson	Riverside
1961	Jim Robinson New Orleans Band – New Orleans: The Living Legends Jim Robinson Plays Spirituals And Blues	Riverside
1961	The Bell Gal And Her Dixieland Boys Music	Riverside
1962	Paul Barbarin & His New Orleans Band – Bourbonstreet Beat	GHB
1962	Paul Barbarin & His New Orleans Band – Punch Miller's Bunch & George Lewis	Atlantic
1962	Olympia Brass Band / Eureka Brass Band – Music Of New Orleans The Brass Bands	Jazzology
1962	Jim Robinson N.O.Band Pierce Billie & De De – Jazz At Preservation Hall 2	Atlantic
1962	Eureka Brass Band – Jazz At Preservation Hall	Collectables Jazz Classics
1962	Thomas Jefferson – Dreaming On The River To New Orleans	GHB
1962	Don Albert – Echoes Of New Orleans	GHB
1962	Peter Bocage & His Creole Serenaders	Jazzology
1963	Sweet Emma Barrett and Her New Orleans Music	Southland
1963	Chink Martin – Shades Of New Orleans	Southland
1964	Paul Barbarin & His New Orleans Band – The Best At Dixieland Hall	Nobility
1964	Bob Havens And His New Orleans All Stars	Southland
1964	Waldron Frog Joseph & His New Orleans Jazz Band	Nobility
1964	Frog and His Friends at Dixieland Hall	Nobility
1964	Barbarin's Best	Riverside
1964	Great Spirituals, Avery 'Kid' Howard and His New Orleans Jazz Band at Zion Hill Church	Nobility
1965	Waldron Frog Joseph Traditional New Orleans Jazz	Dulai
1966	Onward Brass Band In concert 1966	Jazz Crusade
1968	Onward Brass Band	Jazz Crusade
1969	Paul Barnes Quartets	Nola
1969	Paul Barnes & Emile Barnes Quartet	American Music
1969	Paul Barbarin's Onward Brass Band: in Concert	Nobility
1972	Wallace Davenport With Jim Robinson And Louis Nelson	My Jazz
1975	Two Sides of New Orleans	Louisiana Tourist Development Commission
1977	Teddy Riley – Smile With The Sounds Of ...	Kon-ti
1978	Soundtrack for Pretty Baby	ABC

=== Compositions ===
You Don't Love Me (true)
Composed by Cottrell, Lloyd C. Glenn and Don Albert in 1954, the song was included on New Orleans: The Living Legends

- "You Don't Love Me (true)"
- "Blues For Dixie"
- "Drag's Turnaround Blues"

The song "You Don't Love Me (true)" has been recorded by artists such as Paul Gayten, Roy Milton, Camille Howard, The Spiders, Jacques Gauthe and the Preservation Hall Jazz Band.
