= Steve Lewis (musician) =

American jazz musician (1896-c. 1941)

Steve Lewis (March 19, 1896 - c. 1941) was an American jazz pianist and composer.

Lewis was born in New Orleans, Louisiana. In 1910, he began his career as a member of the Silver Leaf Orchestra. He joined the Olympia Orchestra and toured with Bill and Mary Mack in 1917. When he returned to New Orleans, he spent the next ten years in bands with Armand J. Piron. During the 1920s, he taught piano to such students as Luis Russell. He worked as a bandleader and a freelance musician. His last days were spent in a mental institution in Louisiana.

Lewis was an eccentric character. He drove a Ford Model T which he had custom painted in bright multicolored polka-dots. He played the piano without using either of his middle fingers; these he kept extended straight while playing (in the manner of the rude gesture known as Shooting the Bird).

Lewis was influenced by the piano stylings of Tony Jackson and Jelly Roll Morton, and became the premier pianist in Storyville after those two older musicians left town.
