= John Lindsay (musician) =

American jazz musician

- Born: August 23, 1894; New Orleans, Louisiana, U.S.
- Died: July 3, 1950 (aged 63); Chicago, Illinois, U.S.
- Genres: Jazz
- Instruments: Trombone, double bass

John "Johnny" Lindsay or John Lindsey (born August 23, 1894 – July 3, 1950) was an American jazz double-bassist and trombonist, active in the New Orleans and Chicago jazz scenes.

== Career ==
Lindsay learned both instruments while young and played trombone in a military band and in ensembles late in the 1910s. In New Orleans, he played with John Robichaux and Armand J. Piron's Olympia Orchestra; Lindsay was Piron's trombonist on recordings made in New York City in 1923 and 1924. He was in Dewey Jackson's riverboat band in 1924, then relocated to Chicago, where he played with Willie Hightower, Carroll Dickerson, Lil Hardin, and Jelly Roll Morton's Red Hot Peppers. Most of his playing in Chicago and subsequently was on bass rather than trombone. Later in his career he toured nationally with Louis Armstrong (1931–32), Richard M. Jones, Jimmie Noone, Punch Miller, Johnny Dodds, Bertha Hill, Georgia White, Harlem Hamfats, and Baby Dodds.
