= Louis Keppard =

American jazz musician (1888–1986)

Louis Keppard (February 2, 1888, New Orleans – February 18, 1986, New Orleans) was an American jazz guitarist and tubist. He was the brother of Freddie Keppard.

Louis played in the Cherry Blossom Band and then led his own group, the Magnolia Band, which included King Oliver and Honore Dutrey among its members. He played with Papa Celestin's Tuxedo Brass Band and Manuel Perez, and following this with the Olympia Orchestra alongside Freddie. In 1917 he moved briefly to Chicago but returned soon after. He played in several brass bands in New Orleans as an alto hornist and guitarist from the 1920s through the 1950s, including in the Gibson Brass Band and the Young Excelsior Brass Band. His style of "shuffle rhythms" was an influence on Danny Barker. He recorded with Wooden Joe Nicholas in 1949, and retired from music some time after 1962.
