= Pretty Baby (soundtrack) =

Soundtrack album by Various artists
- Released: 1978
- Genre: Ragtime
- Label: ABC Records

The soundtrack to the film Pretty Baby used many local New Orleans musicians playing in the jazz, ragtime, and blues style of the city in the early 20th century. An LP album of the soundtrack, also entitled Pretty Baby, was issued in 1978 on ABC Records. The film is named after the song "Pretty Baby" by Tony Jackson.

The soundtrack was nominated for the Academy Award for Original Music Score in the "Adaptation Score" category.

Performers include the New Orleans Ragtime Orchestra (directed by Lars Edegran), Bob Greene, James Booker, Kid Thomas Valentine, Raymond Burke, Louis Nelson, Louis Barbarin, and Louis Cottrell, Jr.

== Track listing ==
1. "The Honey Swat Blues" (05:38) (public domain)
2. "Elite Syncopations" (03:14) (Scott Joplin; arranged by Lars Edegran)
3. "Heliotrope Bouquet" (02:38) (Scott Joplin/Louis Chauvin)
4. "Pretty Baby" (01:46) (Egbert Van Alstyne/Gus Kahn/Tony Jackson)
5. "King Porter Stomp" (02:52) (Jelly Roll Morton)
6. "Tiger Rag" (00:46) (Original Dixieland Jass Band)
7. "Swipesy" (02:47) (Scott Joplin/Arthur Marshall; arranged by Lars Edegran)
8. "Moonlight Bay" (04:26) (Percy Wenrich/Edward Madden)
9. "Heliotrope Bouquet" (03:25) (Scott Joplin/Louis Chauvin; orchestra version, arranged by Lars Edegran)
10. "Creole Belles" (02:53) (George Sidney/J. Bodewalt Lampe; arranged by Lars Edegran)
11. "Shreveport Stomp" (00:59) (Jelly Roll Morton)
12. "Winin' Boy Blues" (02:23) (Jelly Roll Morton) Vocal by James Booker
13. "After the Ball" (05:13) (Charles K. Harris)
14. "Where Is My Wandering Boy Tonight?" (01:33) (Robert Lowry)
15. "Big Lip Blues" (02:42) (Jelly Roll Morton)
16. "The Ragtime Dance" (01:42) (Scott Joplin; arranged by Lars Edegran)
17. "At A Georgia Camp Meeting" (02:01) (Kerry Mills)
18. "Buddy Bolden's Blues" (02:29) (Jelly Roll Morton)
19. "Mamie's Blues" (01:58) (Mamie Desdoumes)
