= Alcide Pavageau =

American jazz musician

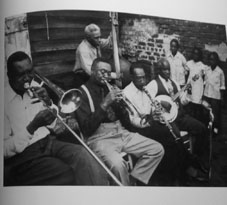
Alcide Pavageau second from left playing string bass. Photograph by Stanley Kubrick, published in Look magazine, 6 June 1950

Alcide Louis "Slow Drag" Pavageau (March 7, 1888 – January 19, 1969) was an American jazz double bassist and guitarist.

== Biography ==
Pavageau was born in New Orleans, Louisiana. He started his career as a dancer, mastering a dance called the Slow Drag which resulted in his nickname. He learned the guitar as a young man from his cousin Ulysses Picou, a singer in New Orleans. Pavageau came from a musical family and was related to families like the Tios, Picous, and Pirons who formed some of the earliest jazz bands. He played Buddy Petit, Bunk Johnson, and Herb Morand. Johnson bragged that he taught Louis Armstrong how to play cornet by ear. He started playing bass in 1927 when he was 39 years old and joined George Lewis's band in 1943. He also played in Bunk Johnson's band in New York City in 1945. He toured with Lewis through the end of the 1950s. In 1961, while playing with the Louis Cottrell Trio, he recorded New Orleans: The Living Legends for Riverside. He worked at Preservation Hall in the 1960s and recorded one album as a leader in 1965 in addition to frequent recording with Lewis.

Pavageau was the son of Ferreol "Joseph" Pavageau and Alice Philippe. He was the descendant of a marriage between two of the oldest Creole families in New Orleans. His family traced their roots to wealthy French planters who were displaced by the Haitian Revolution and friends of Bienville, the founder of New Orleans. For almost 40 years, he was the grand marshal of the Second Line of the Mardi Gras Parade. The second line is known for twirling ornamental umbrellas during their gatherings. The twirling of umbrellas may have been adapted from the early Italian immigrant custom of using umbrellas at funeral processions. Alcide died in 1969 in New Orleans at the age of 80.

Although rumors abound about Alcide Pavageau being a nephew of renowned New Orleans voodoo queen Marie Laveau, this is not true.

== Discography ==
=== As leader ===
- Slow Drag's Bunch (Jazz Crusade)

=== As sideman ===
- Sweet Emma Barrett, New Orleans' Sweet Emma and Her Preservation Hall Jazz Band (Preservation Hall, 1964)
- Louis Cottrell Jr., The Louis Cottrell Trio: Bourbon Street (Riverside, 1961)
- Bunk Johnson, New Orleans 1944 (American Music)
- Bunk Johnson, Hot Jazz (RCA Victor, 1946)
- George Lewis, New Orleans Jazz Band And Quartet (Riverside, 1954)
- George Lewis, George Lewis & Turk Murphy at Newport (Verve, 1957)
- George Lewis, The Perennial George Lewis (Verve, 1958)
- Jim Robinson, Jim Robinson's New Orleans Band (Riverside, 1961)
- Jim Robinson, Jim Robinson Plays Spirituals And Blues (Riverside, 1961)
