= Zue Robertson =

American jazz musician (1891–1943)

- Born: (C. Alvin) Robertson; March 7, 1891; New Orleans, US
- Died: 1943 (aged 51–52) Los Angeles
- Genres: Jazz
- Occupation: Musician
- Instruments: Trombone, piano, organ, bass

Zue (C. Alvin) Robertson (March 7, 1891 – 1943) was an American early jazz musician. He began on trombone in New Orleans, moved to Chicago in 1917, and in the following decade played with leading figures such as Jelly Roll Morton and King Oliver. Robertson switched to piano and organ after moving to New York in 1929, then added bass in the 1930s while living in California.

== Early life ==
Robertson was born in New Orleans on March 7, 1891. His first instrument was the piano, and he began playing the trombone at the age of 13.

== Later life and career ==
Robertson played in circus bands and traveling revues, including Kit Carson's Wild West Show. He was part of the Olympia Band around 1914 and was a trombonist for Manuel Perez, Richard M. Jones, and John Robichaux. Robertson was an early influence on Kid Ory – Robertson gave him lessons, and the two practised together.

After moving to Chicago in 1917 he played at the De Luxe Café, and "by the mid-1920s he was playing with leaders of the stature of Jelly Roll Morton, with whom he recorded 'Some Day Sweetheart/London Blues' (1923, OK 8105), and King Oliver (1924)". Robertson's playing on these tracks consisted of "short notes in a sometimes percussive way [...with] some elements similar to Ory's phrasing, rhythmic sense, and voicing [...] though with less glissando". With the Levee Serenaders, another Morton-led band, Robertson recorded "Midnight Mama" and "Mr. Jelly Lord" in 1928. These two sides, plus the two from 1923, are his only recordings.

After moving to New York in 1929, Robertson concentrated on playing the organ and the piano, and stopped playing the trombone the following year. A few years later he moved to California, where he played piano and bass during the 1930s. He died in Los Angeles in 1943. His life "was barely documented and stories about his talents have to remain unverified".
