= Louis Nelson Delisle =

American jazz clarinetist (1885–1949)

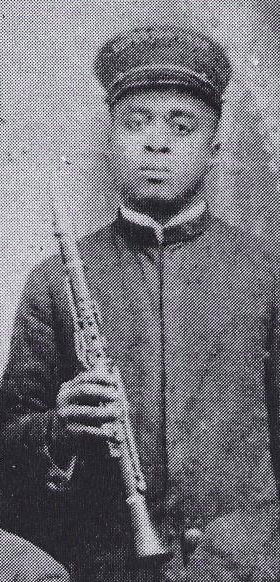
- Nelson Delisle in 1910

Background information
- Also known as: "Big Eye"
- Born: Louis Nelson Delisle; January 28, 1885
- Origin: New Orleans, Louisiana, U.S.
- Died: July 20, 1949 (aged 64)
- Genres: Dixieland, jazz
- Occupation: Musician
- Instrument: Clarinet
- Years active: 1910s – 1940s

"Big Eye" Louis Nelson Delisle (January 28, 1885 – August 20, 1949) was an American Dixieland jazz clarinetist in New Orleans, Louisiana. He also played double bass, banjo, and accordion.

== Early life and education ==
Nelson Delisle was born into a Creole of color family and spent most of his life in New Orleans. He studied clarinet with the elder Lorenzo Tio.

== Career ==
By the age of 15, Delisle worked professionally in the music venues of Storyville, an area of brothels and clubs in New Orleans. He developed a style of hot jazz, a.k.a. Dixieland, and was an influence on clarinetists Johnny Dodds and Jimmie Noone.

Early in his career Delisle often played a C clarinet, as opposed to the more common B♭; the C was used by other New Orleans clarinetists of the era, such as Alcide Nunez.

In 1917, Delisle joined the reconstituted Original Creole Orchestra that included Freddie Keppard and Bill Johnson. The band had disbanded in Boston in the spring of that year but was reassembled in New York City in the fall of the same year. Delisle replaced George Baquet, who had toured with the group in vaudeville. After a short while, Delisle was replaced by Jimmie Noone. He was the regular clarinetist with the Jones & Collins Astoria Hot Eight but did not play on their 1929 recording sessions.

He made his only recordings in his later years in the 1940s, by which time he was often in poor health.
