= Peter DuConge =

American jazz musician

Peter DuConge (1902-1966) was an American jazz reedist, active in the early New Orleans jazz scene.

DuConge was raised in a musical family. His father was a journeyman barber, and had a bass, singing voice. His mother, Daniska, was a soprano. She taught the piano and taught her children music. Three of his brothers were professional musicians; Adolphus DuConge was a pianist, Albert DuConge was a trumpeter, and Earl DuConge was a tenor saxophonist. He played at local clubs in New Orleans such as the Elite Club and Tom Anderson's, with Alex Bigard as one of his sidemen. In the mid-1920s he took work as a musician on riverboats on the Mississippi River, then moved to New York City, playing with the Jim Dandies and Vaughn's Lucky Sambo Orchestra. He then found work with Bill Brown and His Brownies (playing alongside Ovie Alston) and toured Europe as a member of Leon Abbey's orchestra. In 1929 he married Ada "Bricktop" Smith and played in clubs she owned in the 1930s before they formally separated.

Periodically, DuConge worked with Louis Armstrong. In 1932, he was a member of his ensemble for tours of England (1932) and continental Europe (1933–34). He played with Leon Abbey once again in 1934 while in the Netherlands, and also with Coleman Hawkins and Benny Peyton in Europe. In 1939, as World War II erupted, DuConge came back to the United States.
