= Freddie Keppard =

American jazz cornetist (1890-1933)

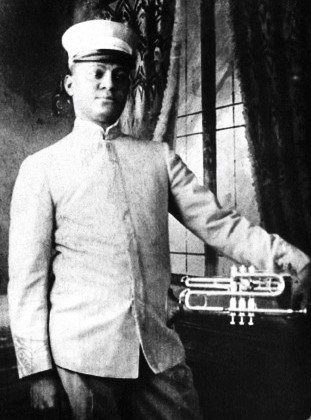

Background information
- Also known as: King Keppard; Fred Keppard
- Born: Freddie Keppard; February 27, 1890; New Orleans, Louisiana, U.S.
- Died: July 15, 1933 (aged 43) Chicago, Illinois, U.S.
- Genres: Jazz
- Occupation: Musician
- Instrument: Cornet

Freddie Keppard (sometimes rendered as Freddy Keppard; February 27, 1890 – July 15, 1933) was an American jazz cornetist who once held the title of "King" in the New Orleans jazz scene. This title was previously held by Buddy Bolden and succeeded by Joe Oliver.

== Early life and career in New Orleans ==
Keppard (pronounced in the French fashion, with relatively even accentuation and a silent d) was born in the Creole of Color community of downtown New Orleans, Louisiana.

Born in 1890, Keppard was Buddy Bolden's junior by thirteen years and Louis Armstrong's senior by eleven years. Keppard's father, Louis Keppard Sr., had been a New Orleans man and had worked as a cook in the Vieux Carré until his early death. His mother, Emily (Peterson) Keppard, was from St. James parish. His older brother, Louis, was his elder by two years and also became a professional musician later in life. The first tune they learned to play together was called "Just Because She Made Dem Goo-Goo Eyes", a tune by Hughie Cannon and popular New Orleans minstrel show star John Queen, published in 1900.

Keppard was raised on Villere Street in New Orleans in a home environment filled with music. His mother first started him on the violin, while his brother Louis first played guitar. When he was still a young boy, he and Louis, who by then had become an aspiring guitarist, would disguise their age from police by putting on long pants before going to Basin Street to shine shoes for a nickel a shine, hoping to get in on the music scene and get advice or even tutelage from their favorite musicians in the District while shoe-shining.

As such, Keppard did not receive any formal musical training and may have been a non-reader who, instead of reading arrangements, most likely learned all of his parts by ear and used his powerful and imaginative abilities to improvise parts that were even better.

Freddie played violin, mandolin, and accordion before switching to cornet. By the time he was ten years old, Freddie had already learned to play mandolin and was performing in a duo with Louis around their neighborhood. He did not begin playing cornet until he was sixteen.

This is most likely because, according to Louis Keppard, one strategy available to aspiring string players in those days was to switch to brass instruments in order to get more job opportunities with brass bands in parades. The Keppards' mother apparently "didn't think much of this music" until she saw them in their band uniforms, at which point Louis recalled that she became very proud.

As Freddie and Louis grew older, both brothers became band leaders in their own right and became part of the competitive New Orleans jazz scene. Freddie Keppard organized the Olympia Orchestra around 1905. This band featured Alphonse Picou on clarinet. As a Creole band, the Olympia Orchestra would have been expected to play a wide repertoire for a variety of gigs, and therefore could play "legitimate" enough to get society jobs, yet "hot" enough to get jobs at the uptown jazz halls a few years later. Louis Keppard led the Magnolia Orchestra, which became the regular band at Huntz's and Nagel's cabaret on Iberville in the District. The Magnolia Orchestra included Joe Oliver on cornet, who would later succeed Keppard's title as "King" by winning a "cutting contest" against him.

After playing with the Olympia Orchestra, Freddie Keppard joined Frankie Dusen's Eagle Band, taking the place recently vacated by Buddy Bolden. Soon after Bolden was off the music scene, Keppard was proclaimed "King Keppard" as the city's top horn player (see: jazz royalty). This was mostly because he kept Buddy's style, which was popular but had not been recorded. Indeed, many contemporaries have testified that Keppard's playing style was the closest to Bolden's that can be found in the history of jazz recordings and can be considered a more musical and sophisticated extension of Bolden's style: rugged and forceful, clipped and more staccato, and rhythmically closer to ragtime than later New Orleans jazz.

== Original Creole Orchestra ==
Sometime in either late 1911 or early 1912, bassist Bill Johnson, who had been making his career in Los Angeles, California since 1909, started the initiative to organize an "Original Creole Ragtime Band" to play the New Orleans style across the country. He invited players from his hometown of New Orleans, including Freddie Keppard, to join him in this enterprise. After Keppard accepted his invitation to play cornet for this band, Johnson managed to get Eddie Vinson on trombone, George Baquet on clarinet, Norwood Williams on guitar, Jimmy Palao on violin, and later Dink Johnson on drums. This group went on the Orpheum Theatre circuit out of San Francisco in 1913 as the "Original Creole Orchestra".

In the following years, the band would tour Chicago and New York. In their 1915 performance at the Winter Garden, for a show entitled Town Topics, the group was billed as "That Creole Band." Thus, Freddie Keppard was among the first musicians as well as the first cornetist to take the New Orleans ensemble style outside of the city.

In 1914, Keppard's band performed in Canada, at the Pantages Playhouse Theatres in Winnipeg, the first ever jazz performance outside the United States. This was the beginning of jazz as an international art form, although the name jazz was still a couple years in the future, the band performing as a ragtime band at the time.

Keppard, who signed one photograph of himself with a caption describing himself as the "star cornetist" of the "Creole Ragtime Band," probably considered himself the star of the Original Creole Orchestra. Although he was the youngest member of the band, he is perhaps the most well-known of all of its members and is more often mentioned in histories of jazz. This is most likely because he was one of the few members to make surviving recordings. Because of his relative fame compared to the other band members, many assume that the Creole Band was led by Keppard. There is, however, no evidence that Keppard played any major role in the organization of the band (planning tours and events, choosing songs for the repertoire, signing contracts, etc.). As such, Bill Johnson was most likely the leader of the group.

From 1915 to 1917, the Original Creole Orchestra (sometimes also rendered as the "Original Creole Band") landed jobs at Loew's Orpheum, Lexington Opera House, and the Columbia Theater, as well as a return performance to the Winter Garden. Newspaper reviewers in New York commented on the "rather ragged selection" of the band's repertoire as well as the "comedy effect of the clarinet," a testament to the American public's unfamiliarity with the "hot" style of New Orleans. During the band's time on the east coast, other personnel who came to play in the Original Creole Orchestra included Bab Frank on piccolo and Big Eye Louis Nelson (De Lisle) on clarinet.

The Original Creole Orchestra, after touring the Vaudeville circuit, gave other parts of the USA a first taste of the music that was not yet known as "jazz". While playing a successful engagement in New York City in 1915, the band was offered a chance to record for the Victor Talking Machine Company. This would probably have been the first jazz recording. An often repeated story says that Keppard didn't want to record because then everyone else could "steal his stuff." This fear, however, was not too far-fetched if we think forward to the Alligators in Chicago taking King Olivers' material, such as in the case of the recording of Oliver's "Eccentric" by the New Orleans Rhythm Kings. Another well known story is that he was so worried about being copied that he sometimes played with a handkerchief over his hand to conceal his fingering. Keppard's famous tendency to hide his fingerings during performances, however, was most likely a publicity stunt intended only to amuse the crowd. After all, a real musician would steal by ear and not by eye. In any case, the recording company offered him a $25 flat fee to make a record (a fairly standard rate for non-star performers at the time), far less than he was earning on the Vaudeville circuit. His retort to this offer, according to Lawrence Gushee, was: "Twenty-Five dollars? I drink that much gin in a day!" The reminiscences of the other members of the Creole Orchestra reveal that another factor was that the Victor representative had asked them to make a "test recording" without pay. The band balked, fearing it was a ploy to have them make records without being paid. Another popular rumor which traveled through some of the New York jazz circles for some time also suggested that Keppard had refused to record because he had been afraid of being cheated by the record company and had demanded the same fees as that of the Victor Company's highest paid and best-selling artist of the time, Enrico Caruso.

The band continued touring successfully until the group finally broke up in 1918. According to Dave Peyton, who had been the leader of the Grand Theater Orchestra in 1915, the Original Creole Band had been so popular when the group hit Chicago that they "were bidded for by every theatrical agency in the city." They were so popular, in fact, that, a few years after the band dissolved, Peyton asserted that "when they hit Broadway they were a great sensation and would be on the road today were it not for dissatisfaction among themselves and the loss of several of their members by death."

== Career in Chicago ==
About 1917, Keppard settled in Chicago, which would remain his home (except for briefly going to the East Coast to work with Tim Brymn's band about 1920). Soon after he had settled himself into the Chicago jazz scene, however, King Oliver became Chicago's "cornet king" and was said to have attracted crowds by "thrusting his horn out of a window and blowing Keppard down." Nevertheless, Keppard did well in finding continuous employment with a wide range of bandleaders, at one point leading his own group with Jimmie Noone on clarinet and Paul Barbarin on drums.

Keppard worked in Chicago both as a soloist and with the bands of Jimmie Noone, Johnny Dodds, Erskine Tate, Doc Cook (for several years), Don Pasqual, Lil Hardin Armstrong, Ollie Powers, and John Wycliffe, all of which were highly respected local bands. Keppard was one of the first to bring jazz to the West Coast.

Don Pasqual, who played reed instruments for Doc Cook for some time, had much to say about Keppard's contributions to Doc Cook's band:

Keppard really gave the band a lift and then we really went to town. Later, Andrew Hilaire and Johnny St. Cyr joined the band. Doc Cook seldom wrote out any special parts for Freddie Keppard but would just give him his head and while we were playing the arrangements Keppard would do anything he wanted.

— Don Pasqual

After he found steady employment in Chicago, Keppard's style helped create a demand for more New Orleans groups, paving the way for other New Orleans players seeking to migrate north. Throughout his travels, Keppard sent back clippings to his fellow musicians in New Orleans, encouraging other bands to take their chances on the cross-country circuits.

== Recordings ==
Sidney Bechet believed it was because Keppard was a "good-time guy" that he refused the Victor Company's offer to make the first jazz recordings while he was still playing with the Original Creole Orchestra. In other words, he simply didn't want to make the recordings because the Victor Company represented big business and commercialization. Thus, if Keppard had agreed to make recordings for them with the Original Creole Band, the music would no longer have been for pure enjoyment but would have been turned into a commodity.

In the Victor Company files, there is a listing for an unnumbered test recording for a song called "Tack 'em Down" made by the "Creole Jass Band" on December 2, 1918 nearly two years after Keppard's first performance in New York. This recording may have been Keppard and the Original Creole Band.

The first recordings of New Orleans/Dixieland jazz came out in the 1920s, nearly two decades after the "hot" New Orleans sound and style had first been developed. By the time musicians of color like Freddie Keppard were recording, the Original Dixieland Jazz Band, an all-white band, had already made the first jazz recordings and had dominated the market for jazz recordings with their million-dollar hit "Livery Stable Blues." The ODJB's rendition of "Livery Stable Blues" came from a song Freddie Keppard performed. According to Keppard's contemporaries, the barnyard effects in the ODJB's version were jokes. As Mutt Carey, a fellow New Orleans trumpeter recalled, when Keppard was feeling good, "he'd get devilish sometimes and he'd neigh on the trumpet like a horse" to be humorous.

Musicians from Keppard's time who had either worked with him or heard him play praised his technical abilities and creativity. Mutt Carey, while respecting King Oliver, spoke of Keppard as the king of New Orleans jazz, calling him the best cornetist before Louis Armstrong.

Freddie had a lot of ideas and a big tone too. When he hit a note you knew it was a hit. I mean he had a beautiful tone and he played with so much feeling too. Yes, he had everything: he was ready in every respect. Keppard could play any kind of song good. Technique, attack, tone, and ideas were all there. He didn't have very much formal musical education but he sure was a natural musician. All you had to do was play a number for him once and he had it… he was a natural! When Freddie got to playing… he was no freak man like Joe Oliver. Freddie was a trumpet player anyway you'd grab him. He could play sweet and then he could play hot. He'd play sweet sometimes and then turn around and knock the socks off you with something hot.

— Mutt Carey

Willie Humphrey, a New Orleans jazz clarinetist, had also played with Freddie Keppard around the summer of 1919, at a time when half of New Orleans followed Joe Oliver and half the town followed Keppard. Humphrey recalled that Keppard was known as the musician's musician, Jelly Roll Morton's favorite musician, and "everybody's all-star."

Freddie had such beautiful tone. Such beautiful tone. Good ideas. Freddie played all over his horn. He had a different style altogether from Joe Oliver. Oliver was much rougher, you understand. Freddie was nice and light. Clear. You could be sitting right under him, and it would sound just as nice. But you could hear him two, three blocks away.

— Willie Humphrey

Jelly Roll Morton said of Freddie Keppard that he "had the best ear, the best tone, and the most marvelous execution I ever heard." Buster Bailey, a clarinetist who played with both Joe Oliver and Louis Armstrong, recalled that Keppard "could play as soft and as loud, as sweet and as rough, as you would want." Alberta Hunter, a blues singer and another artist who had been largely forgotten until she made her comeback in her eighties, also wondered why Freddie Keppard was often overlooked or unmentioned in many accounts of the histories of jazz. "You know," she reportedly said, "he doesn't get the credit he should get."

Some of the commentary on Keppard's playing, however, is admittedly quite contradictory. Of those who spoke of Keppard as a "freak player," most referred to him in this way because of his ability to utilize a variety of mutes and playing techniques, such as flutter-tonguing and half-valving. Others, however, insist that Keppard was a "much straighter player" than Joe Oliver. Additionally, while qualified listeners like Jelly Roll Morton were full of praise for Keppard's playing style, others like the younger Louis Armstrong is said to have described Keppard's playing as "fancy" (in an unflattering sense of the word).

Keppard made all his known recordings in Chicago from 1923 to 1927. The only recordings under his own name are three sides under Freddie Keppard's Jazz Cardinals, then two with Erskine Tate's Vendome Orchestra, and a dozen with Doc Cook's Orchestra. These feature Keppard on second cornet, the logical and quite demanding seat for the premier cornetist in a two-cornet band, as evidenced by Louis Armstrong's role in similar sized bands and orchestras around the same period. His "Stockyard Strut" is an improvisation on the chords of "Tiger Rag". Keppard contributed to the Doc Cook recordings where he plays the 'walking-talking' style of "Stomp Cornet" that pre-dates jazz by about a half generation. It follows ragtime by the same margin. Keppard may have appeared on a few other recordings; many more are often dubiously attributed to him. Keppard was widely imitated both in New Orleans and Chicago, including contemporaneous and highly regarded players such as Louis Panico and Frank Guarente. Other recordings made by Keppard include Salty Dog," "Adam's Apple," "Stomp Time Blues," and "Messing Around." All the recordings quoted above are contained in the Retrieval CD at bottom.

Several musicians with clear memories of Buddy Bolden said that Freddie Keppard sounded the most like Bolden of anyone who recorded. This is how many jazz historians propose that Keppard got his fame but also how he lost it. Keppard did not have a sound of his own and he came up in between Buddy, Oliver, and Armstrong. Keppard was extremely talented but was not unique. Others, like Lawrence Gushee, insist that Keppard did have a unique approach to playing the cornet, which simply became overshadowed by Louis Armstrong's powerful influence. Gushee describes Keppard as "frequently on top of the beat or [anticipating] it," making his "phrasing excitable, even tense." Whereas "Armstrong seems to favor extended four or eight-measure structure, Keppard [built] his units out of shorter modules" underscored by vibrato. Gushee also argues that Keppard used a much more "rapid vibrato, more like an ornament, that could be used anyplace in a phrase." Armstrong and Keppard met, but unfortunately, their first encounter was a letdown; instead of playing with Armstrong on the band stand, Keppard left in order to talk to customers, including an attractive blonde.

Many contemporaries said that either Keppard was past his prime when he recorded or that his recordings do not do him justice, as Keppard's health was already declining by the time he recorded in 1926. Even with the constraints, the recordings demonstrate that Keppard was a very proficient player and an adventurous improviser. Keppard's style is much more raggy and characterized by a "brusque and staccato style" compared to Oliver's blues-tinged style. While Oliver had more admirers, to some extent preference was a matter of taste. Jelly Roll Morton, Lil Hardin Armstrong, and Wellman Braud all thought Keppard superior to Oliver.

Keppard suffered from alcoholism and tuberculosis in his final years, although he continued performing despite illnesses. He was still playing loud in the early 1930s in Chicago, although, according to contemporaries, no longer very well. By 1932, Keppard was restricted in his employment most likely due to his continued physical degradation. According to medical records, he was unable to work by December 1932. He died in Chicago in 1933, largely forgotten. However, trumpet player Bob Shoffner recalled that in 1931 when Louis Armstrong's band had been preparing to leave Chicago on a tour bus, Armstrong instructed the bus driver to stop in front of Keppard's apartment. The band went up the stairs to offer their greetings to the "old-timer."

== Discography ==
1923-27 - The Complete Set 1923-1926 (Retrieval, 1999) - All the recordings made by Keppard in his short life. The last 3 are the only know under his name.
