= Louis Cottrell Sr. =

American jazz drummer (1878–1927)

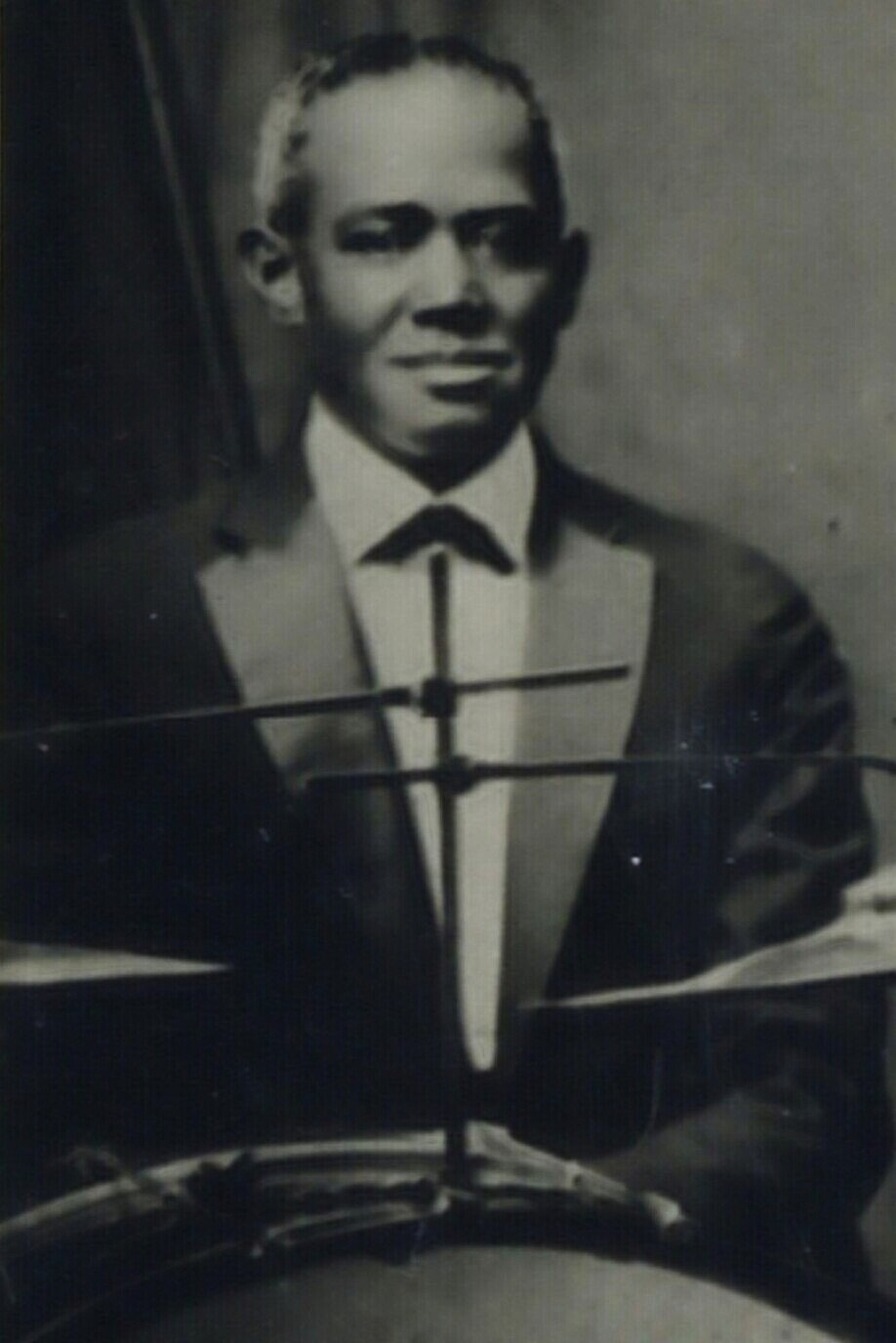
- Louis Albert Cottrell Sr.

Background information
- Also known as: "Old Man" Cottrell
- Born: December 25, 1878; New Orleans, Louisiana, United States
- Died: October 17, 1927 (aged 48) New Orleans
- Genre: Jazz
- Occupation: Drummer
- Formerly of: Olympia Orchestra
- Children: Louis Cottrell Jr. (son)

Louis Cottrell (December 25, 1878 – October 17, 1927) was an influential American jazz drummer. "Old Man" Cottrell was the father of Louis Cottrell Jr. and great-grandfather of New Orleans jazz drummer Louis Cottrell.

Cottrell was born and died in New Orleans. He played with John Robichaux's orchestra in 1909 and with the Olympia Orchestra in New Orleans from 1900 to 1915. From 1916 to 1918 he played in Chicago with Manuel Perez, then played with A.J. Piron until the time of his death.

"Old Man" Cottrell has been credited as the innovator of the press roll in jazz drumming, and was a significant influence on most New Orleans drummers of the time, having taught Alex Bigard, Baby Dodds, Paul Barbarin, Louis Barbarin, Freddie Kohlman, Cie Frazier and Alfred Williams.
