= Jimmy Palao =

American jazz musician

- Born: February 19, 1879; Algiers, New Orleans, Louisiana, United States
- Died: January 8, 1925 (aged 45) Chicago, Illinois
- Genres: Jazz
- Occupations: Instrumentalist, bandleader
- Instruments: Violin, saxophone, cornet, mellophone
- Years active: 1890s–1924

James Palao (February 19, 1879 – January 8, 1925) was an American jazz musician.

== Early life ==
Palao was born in Algiers, New Orleans, Louisiana, on February 19, 1879. His parents were Felix Palao and Clotile Rebecca Spriggs. Jimmy had violin lessons as a child.

== Later life and career ==
Palao's profession was recorded as "musician" in the 1900 census, but little is known of his career prior to 1907, although he did play in local bands such as the Pacific Brass Band. Palao married Armontine Carter in 1905. The couple had five children, four of whom survived infancy.

In 1911, his composition "O You Sweet Rag" was published by H. Kirkus Dugdale. Armontine left him in 1912 and moved to Los Angeles; Palao rejoined her there the following year. In California, he started working in a string trio with Norwood Williams and Dink Johnson. They recruited several others from New Orleans to form The Original Creole Orchestra. The other members were Freddy Keppard, Eddie Vincent, and George Baquet. Palao and his family moved to New York City around 1916, and stayed for two years.

Palao played with King Oliver's band during 1921–22. In 1923 he was with the Syncopated Ginger Snaps, accompanying Dave and Tessie, who were a song and dance act. Around 1924, Palao and his family moved to Chicago from Milwaukee. He had to leave the touring Syncopated Ginger Snaps and return to Chicago because he had tuberculosis. He died there on January 8, 1925, and was buried at Mount Olivet Cemetery.
