= Omer Simeon =

American jazz clarinetist (1902–1959)

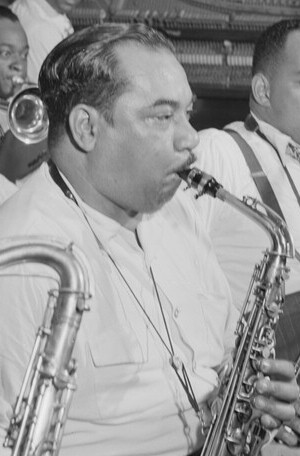
- Simeon circa 1947

Background information
- Born: Omer Victor Simeon; July 21, 1902; New Orleans, Louisiana, U.S.
- Died: September 17, 1959 (aged 57) New York City, U.S.
- Genres: Jazz
- Occupation: Musician
- Instrument: Clarinet
- Years active: 1920–1950s

Omer Victor Simeon (July 21, 1902 – September 17, 1959) was an American jazz clarinetist. He also played soprano, alto, and baritone saxophone and bass clarinet.

== Biography ==
The son of a cigar maker, Omer Simeon was born in New Orleans, Louisiana. His family moved to Chicago, Illinois. He learned clarinet from the New Orleans musician Lorenzo Tio, Jr. and started playing professionally in 1920.

He worked in Chicago and Milwaukee, Wisconsin, with various bands, including Jimmy Bell's Band and Charlie Elgar's Creole Orchestra.

Starting in 1926, he began playing with Jelly Roll Morton, and made a well regarded series of recordings with Morton's Red Hot Peppers and smaller groups. Simeon also taught music. In 1927, he joined King Oliver's Dixie Syncopators with whom he moved to New York City. After time back in Chicago with Elgar, he joined the Luis Russell in Manhattan, then again returned to Chicago in 1928 to play with the Erskine Tate Orchestra. In 1931, he began a 10-year stint with Earl Hines.

In the 1940s, he worked in the bands of Coleman Hawkins and Jimmie Lunceford. After some recordings with Kid Ory's band, he spent most of the 1950s with the Wilbur de Paris band, including a tour of Africa in 1957. In 1954, he played saxophone in a duet with Louis Armstrong on trumpet in Armstrong's popular Dixieland recording of "Skokiaan."

Omer Simeon died of throat cancer in New York City at the age of 57.
