= Frankie Duson =

American jazz musician

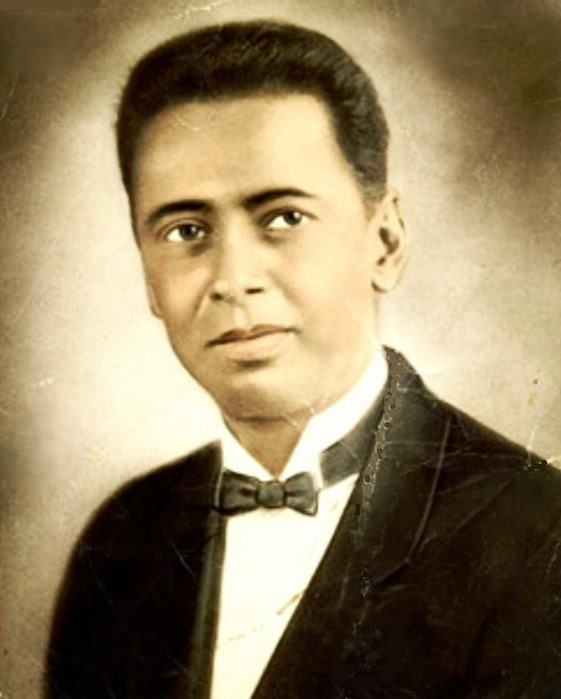
- Frankie Duson (1924)

Background information
- Born: 1878; New Orleans, Louisiana, U.S.
- Died: 1936 (aged 57–58) New Orleans
- Genre: Jazz
- Occupation: Musician
- Instrument: Trombone

Frankie Duson Jr. (also Dusen; 1878–1936) was an early New Orleans jazz trombonist.

== Biography ==
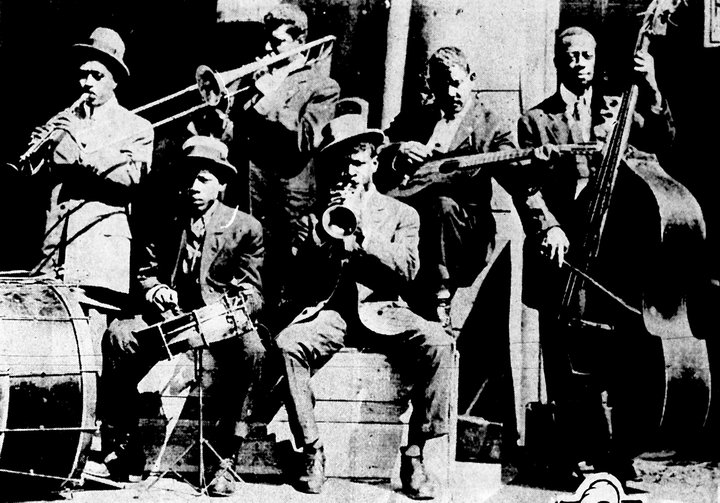
The Eagle Band with Dusen on trombone, 1916. This version of the band included Edmond Hall on clarinet and Buddie Petit on cornet.

He was born in Algiers section of New Orleans.

He played with Buddy Bolden's band, and following Bolden's health problems took over as bandleader of the group and renamed it The Eagle Band, considered one of the best in New Orleans for more than a decade. During the Great Depression he played with the era orchestra on the ship "S.S Capitol," and later played alongside Louis Dumaine.

He also taught music. He died in 1936 at the age of 58.
