= Lorenzo Tio =

American jazz clarinetist (1893–1933)

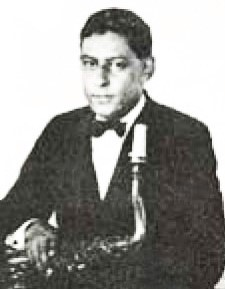
- Tio in 1920

Background information
- Born: April 21, 1893; New Orleans, Louisiana, U.S.
- Died: December 24, 1933 (aged 40) New York City, U.S.
- Genres: Ragtime; jazz
- Occupation: Musician
- Instruments: Clarinet; saxophone; oboe

Lorenzo Tio Jr. (April 21, 1893 – December 24, 1933) was an American clarinetist from New Orleans, Louisiana, United States.

== Biography ==
Tio was born into a family of musicians, including his father Lorenzo Tio Sr. (1867–1908) and uncle Louis "Papa" Tio (1862–1922). Their method of playing the instrument (which involved the Albert system, a double-lip embouchure, and soft reeds) was seminal in the development of the jazz solo.

The three Tios helped bring classical music theory to the ragtime, blues, and jazz musicians of New Orleans; Lorenzo Jr. eventually played jazz himself. Lorenzo Sr. taught Louis Nelson Delisle. Many reed players significant in early jazz studied with Lorenzo Tio Jr., including Sidney Bechet, Barney Bigard, Johnny Dodds, Omer Simeon, Louis Cottrell Jr., Jimmie Noone, and Albert Nicholas. Tio Jr. taught Bigard what would become the main theme to the Duke Ellington tune "Mood Indigo".

Lorenzo Tio Jr. also played oboe. He joined Manuel Perez's band in Chicago in 1916 and Armand J. Piron's from 1918 to 1928, and recorded with Piron, Bechet, Jelly Roll Morton, and Clarence Williams. After the dissolution of Piron's orchestra, Tio moved to New York in 1930, performing from 1932 with the orchestra at the Nest club.

He died of heart disease in New York on December 24, 1933, at the age of 40, and was buried in New Orleans on December 31.
