= Alphonse Picou =

African American jazz clarinetist (1878–1961)

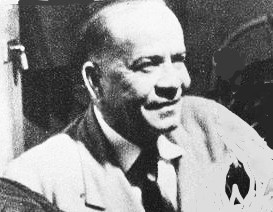
- Alphonse Picou (1950)

Background information
- Birth name: Alphonse Floristan Picou
- Born: October 19, 1878; New Orleans, Louisiana, United States
- Died: February 4, 1961 (aged 82); New Orleans, Louisiana, United States
- Genres: Jazz
- Occupation: Clarinetist
- Instrument: Clarinet

Alphonse Floristan Picou (October 19, 1878 – February 4, 1961) was an important very early American jazz clarinetist, who also wrote and arranged music. He was born and died in New Orleans, Louisiana.

== Early life and education ==
Alphonse Picou was born into a prosperous middle-class Creole of Color family in downtown New Orleans, Louisiana, United States. His parents were Alfred Picou and Clotilde (Serpas) Picou, who also had other children: Cecilia, Willie, Feriol, Joseph, and Philomene Picou.

== Career ==
By the age of 16, he was working as a professional musician on both the guitar and clarinet, but then concentrated on the latter instrument. As his family frowned on music being a person's sole trade, Picou trained and worked as a tinsmith, including putting the copper sheeting on church steeples. Soon Picou was so much in demand as a clarinetist that he made most of his living from music.

He played classical music with the Creole section's Lyre Club Symphony Orchestra. He also played with various dance bands and brass bands, including those of Bouboul Fortunea Augustat, Bouboul Valentin, Oscar DuConge, Manuel Perez, Freddie Keppard, Bunk Johnson, the Excelsior Brass Band, the Olympia Brass Band and others. The light-skinned Picou, with majority European ancestry, sometimes worked with white bands as well in his youth, including at least on occasion with Papa Jack Laine. (This opportunity was not available to musicians with darker skin due to racial discrimination in the U.S. Southern States at the time.)

Picou was one of the early musicians playing in the new style that was developing in the city, not yet known as "jazz". He sometimes played in the band of Buddy Bolden, perhaps the most important force in the musical change.

Many younger clarinetists, including Johnny Dodds and Jimmie Noone, cited Picou as an important influence. Picou's style (those who knew him for many years said that his style when he recorded was little changed from how he had played early in the 20th century) is lilting with a gentle raggy feel. His subtle variations are usually more melodic embellishments than what would later be called improvisation. His style struck many who heard Picou late in his career as either "not quite jazz" or "just barely jazz".

Picou is perhaps best known for originating the clarinet part on the standard "High Society". Some have mistakenly stated that he wrote the number, which was a 1901 marching band composition by Porter Steele. Picou rearranged it giving it a gentle swing and paraphrased the piccolo part to create his famous clarinet solo. This became a local standard part, and no younger New Orleans clarinetist was considered proficient until he could play a duplication of Picou's part. Unusually in a music that values improvisation, it became a set piece. Commonly, later clarinetists would solo once through reproducing or sticking close to Picou's solo, and then do their own improvisations on a second solo.

He often played on an unusual Albert Penzel-Mueler alto clarinet with the horn bent upwards instead of straight ahead. It can be seen on several photos of Picou and is displayed at the Historic New Orleans Collection.

Alphonse Picou at least once followed fellow musicians up north to Chicago about 1917–1918 (and possibly briefly to New York City in the early 1920s), but said he did not like life up North. He spent most of his career in his home city.

"King" Joe Oliver commissioned Picou to write new tunes for his band. Picou's compositions include "Alligator Hop", and "Olympia Rag".

During the Great Depression, Picou returned to metal smithing. In the 1940s, he was able to return to playing professionally regularly, made his first recordings, and opened a bar in a building he owned on Claiborne Avenue. For years into the 1950s, he was a regular on Bourbon Street in the French Quarter with Papa Celestin's Band (with whom he also did radio broadcasts) and leading his own group.

Picou's funeral procession in 1961, was one of the largest the city had seen, with several brass bands and many additional musicians playing Picou a sendoff. Though Picou was a Catholic, the service was conducted by a Baptist minister.
