= Armand J. Piron =

American jazz violinist (1888–1943)

- Born: Armand John Piron; August 16, 1888; New Orleans, Louisiana, U.S.
- Died: February 17, 1943 (aged 54) New Orleans, Louisiana, U.S.
- Genres: Jazz, Dixieland
- Occupation: Musician
- Instrument: Violin
- Years active: 1904–1935

Armand John "A.J." Piron (August 16, 1888 – February 17, 1943) was an American jazz violinist who led dance bands during the 1910s thru the 1930s.

== Early life ==
A.J. Piron was born August 16, 1888, to Octave Louis Piron and Marie Jeanne Zeringue (Jennie). While this is the date according to his draft registration card, his birth record states he was born August 26, 1889. The former date is more widely accepted. At home his family spoke English and French patois, although Piron spoke mostly English.

Piron grew up with his five siblings in the 7th Ward at 1523-24 Columbus Street, steps from Claiborne Avenue, which at that time was a bustling, tree-lined center of commerce and community life. Octave Piron was a shoemaker and a musician himself. He was both a music teacher and played in the Philharmonic Orchestra alongside many well known musicians of the time like Manuel Perez, Charlie Elgar, Ida Rose, and Alphonse Picou, among others. Octave Piron taught his sons Milford, Albert, and Armand Piron how to play.

At the age of seven Piron had an accident that damaged one of his legs. For the next five years while Piron recovered, he devoted himself to practicing the violin. This could be the reason A.J. Piron didn't join the numerous marching bands popular in New Orleans at that time but instead became a dance and concert band musician. At age twelve Piron made his musical debut when he joined a band his father led that included some of his students and Piron's brothers.

== Career ==
In 1903 Piron began playing in the Bloom Philharmonic. In 1908 he played for the Peerless Orchestra. Then in 1913 he played in the large, legendary orchestra organized by John P. Robichaux for the Carnival ball of the Elves of Oberon. That same year Piron was playing at the Rose Bud Theater on Dryades Street, sometimes with Papa Celestin's Tuxedo band. He also played in the Olympia Band with Sydney Bechet, Kid Ory, Louis Keppard, and Clarence Williams, among others.

After touring briefly with W.C. Handy in 1917, Piron started an orchestra which included Lorenzo Tio, Steve Lewis, John Lindsay, and Peter Bocage. The theme song of the orchestra was "The Purple Rose of Cairo", written by Piron and Steve Lewis. In 1923, Piron took his band to New York City.

== Discography ==
1923-25 Armand J. Piron_The Complete Set (Retrieval RTR 79041, 2003)
