= Sidney Bechet =

American jazz saxophonist, clarinetist, and composer (1897–1959)

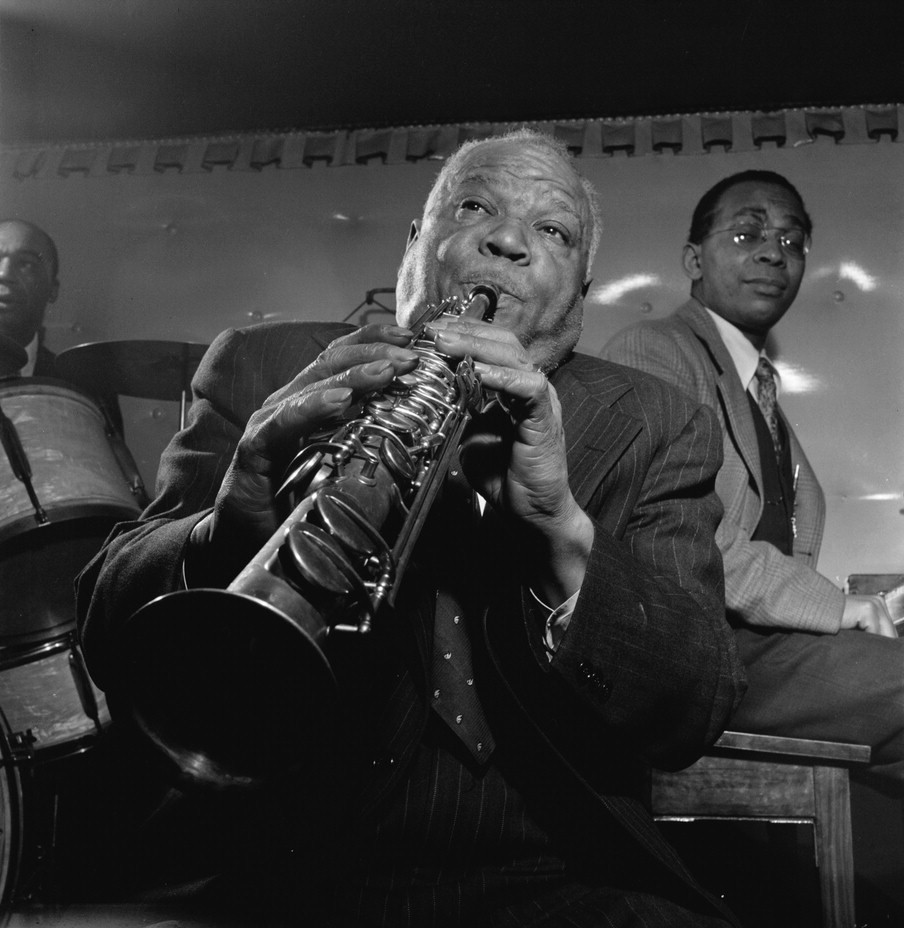
- Bechet at Jimmy Ryan's club, New York, 1947, photograph by William P. Gottlieb

Background information
- Born: May 14, 1897; New Orleans, Louisiana, U.S.
- Died: May 14, 1959 (aged 62) Garches, France
- Genres: Jazz, New Orleans jazz
- Occupations: Musician, composer
- Instruments: Clarinet, soprano saxophone
- Years active: 1908–1957
- Formerly of: Louis Armstrong, Tommy Ladnier

Sidney Joseph Bechet (/bɛˈʃeɪ/ beh-SHAY; May 14, 1897 – May 14, 1959) was an American jazz saxophonist, clarinetist, and composer. He was one of the first important soloists in jazz, first recording in July 1923, a few months after trumpeter Louis Armstrong's recording debut with King Oliver's Creole Jazz Band. His erratic temper hampered his music career, and not until the late 1940s did he earn wide acclaim. Bechet spent much of his later life in France.

== Biography ==
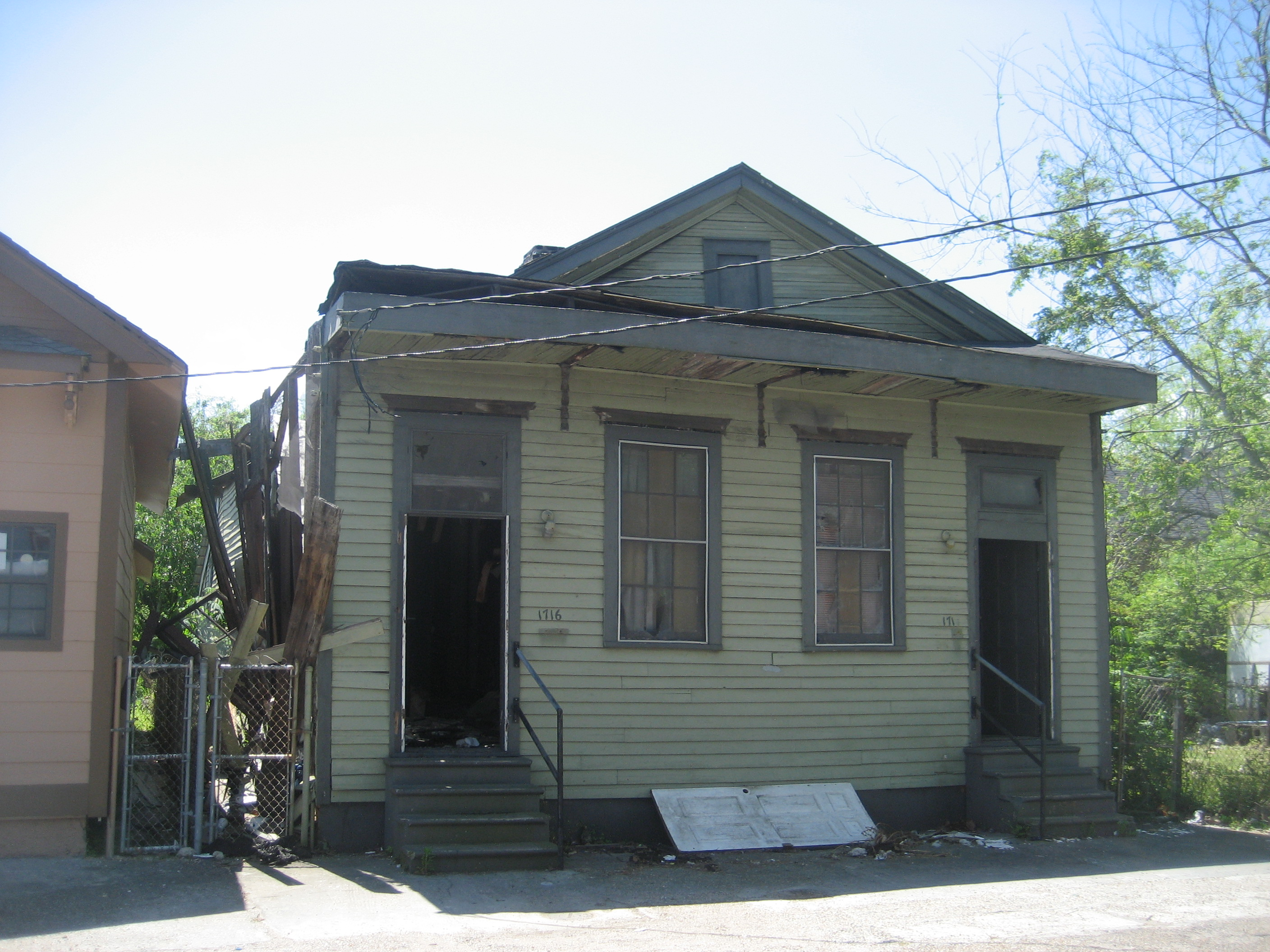
Bechet's childhood home in the 7th Ward of New Orleans

=== Early life ===
Bechet was born in New Orleans in 1897 to a middle-class Creole of color family. Bechet's father Omar was both a shoemaker and a flute player, and all four of his brothers were musicians as well.

His older brother, Leonard Victor Bechet, was a full-time dentist and a part-time trombonist and bandleader. Bechet learned and mastered several musical instruments that were kept around the house (he began on the cornet), mostly by teaching himself; he decided to specialize in the clarinet (which he played almost exclusively until about 1919).

At the age of six, he started performing with his brother's band at a family birthday party, debuting his talents to acclaim. Later in his youth, Bechet studied with Joseph "King" Oliver, Bunk Johnson, Freddie Keppard, Lorenzo Tio, "Big Eye" Louis Nelson Delisle, and George Baquet.

=== Musical development ===
Bechet played in many New Orleans ensembles using the improvisational techniques of the time (obbligatos with scales and arpeggios and varying the melody). While working with Louis Armstrong, Bechet was one of the first musicians to develop the loose, fluid "swinging" rhythmic style that set jazz apart from ragtime. Bechet liked to have his sound dominate in a performance, and trumpeters reportedly found it difficult to play alongside him.

He performed in parades with Freddie Keppard's brass band, the Olympia Orchestra, and in John Robichaux's dance orchestra. From 1911 to 1912, he performed with Bunk Johnson in the Eagle Band of New Orleans and in 1913–14 with King Oliver in the Olympia Band. From 1914 to 1917, he was touring and traveling, going as far north as Chicago and frequently performing with Freddie Keppard.

A Buescher True-Tone soprano saxophone, c. 1922–23, similar to that which Bechet played (although this example is pitched in C rather than B♭)

In the spring of 1919, he traveled to New York City and joined Will Marion Cook's Syncopated Orchestra. Soon after, the orchestra traveled to Europe, where they performed at the Royal Philharmonic Hall in London. The group was warmly received, and Bechet was especially popular.

While in London, he discovered the straight soprano saxophone and developed a style unlike his clarinet tone. Bechet was the first influential soprano saxophonist, leading to its rising popularity as a jazz instrument.

His saxophone sound could be described as emotional, reckless, and all-encompassing. He often used a broad vibrato, similar to some New Orleans clarinetists at the time. In 1919, a Swiss classical music conductor, Ernest Ansermet, wrote a tribute to Bechet. It was one of the earliest (if not the first) articles about a jazz musician written by an expert in the field of classical music, linking Bechet's music with that of Bach.

Bechet's first recordings, "Wild Cat Blues" and "Kansas City Man Blues", were made on July 30, 1923, with pianist Clarence Williams's "Blue Five"; the former is in a ragtime style with four 16-bar themes, and the latter is a 12-bar blues. Louis Armstrong joined the Blue Five the following year, including "Texas Moaner Blues". Armstrong and Bechet recorded together again in January 1925, on "Cake Walkin' Babies from Home", released under the Red Onion Jazz Babies billing. In 1924, Bechet worked with Duke Ellington for three months and made a significant impact on Ellington's early jazz style. Duke Ellington called him "the epitome of jazz". However, he never learned how to read music in his lifetime of being a musician.

=== Bechet in France ===
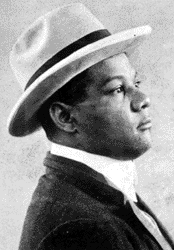
Bechet in 1922

On September 15, 1925, Bechet and other members of the Revue Nègre, including Josephine Baker, sailed to Europe, arriving at Cherbourg, France, on September 22. The revue opened at the Théâtre des Champs-Élysées in Paris on October 2. The show was an example of negrophilia in France at the time. He toured Europe with multiple bands, reaching as far as Russia in mid-1926. In 1928, he led his small band at Chez Bricktop (run by the popular Ada "Bricktop" Smith) in Montmartre, Paris.

In France, Bechet found that he was appreciated by a wider audience and had more general freedom than he did in the United States.

In 1928, Bechet was imprisoned in Paris for eleven months. In his autobiography, he wrote that he accidentally shot a woman when he was trying to shoot a musician who had insulted him. He had challenged the man to duel and said, "Sidney Bechet never plays the wrong chord." After his release, he was deported to the United States. He joined with Lorenzo Tio and also came to know trumpeter Roy Eldridge.

In 1932, Bechet returned to New York City to lead a band with Tommy Ladnier. The band, comprising six members, performed at the Savoy Ballroom. He played in Noble Sissle's orchestra, which toured in Germany and Russia.

=== Later life ===
In 1938, "Hold Tight, Hold Tight (Want Some Seafood Mama)", commonly known as "Hold Tight", was composed by Bechet's guitarist Leonard Ware and two session singers with claimed contributions from Bechet himself. The song became known for its suggestive lyrics and then for a series of lawsuits over songwriter royalties.

In 1939, Bechet and the pianist Willie "The Lion" Smith led a group that recorded several early versions of what was later called Latin jazz, adapting traditional méringue, rhumba and Haitian songs to the jazz idiom. On July 28, 1940, Bechet made a guest appearance on the NBC Radio show The Chamber Music Society of Lower Basin Street, playing two of his showpieces ("Shake It and Break It" and "St. Louis Blues") with Henry Levine's Dixieland band. Levine invited Bechet into the RCA Victor recording studio (on 24th Street in New York City), where Bechet lent his soprano sax to Levine's traditional arrangement of "Muskrat Ramble". On April 18, 1941, as an early experiment in overdubbing at Victor, Bechet recorded a version of the pop song "The Sheik of Araby", playing six different instruments: clarinet, soprano saxophone, tenor saxophone, piano, bass, and drums. A hitherto unissued master of this recording was included in the 1965 LP Bechet of New Orleans, issued by RCA Victor as LPV-510. In the liner notes, George Hoeffer quoted Bechet:

November 1947--Bill Reinhardt (clarinet), Danny Alvin (drums), Bechet (soprano sax), Mel Grant (piano), and Munn Ware (trombone).

I started by playing The Sheik on piano and played the drums while listening to the piano. I meant to play all the rhythm instruments but got all mixed up and grabbed my soprano, then the bass, then the tenor saxophone, and finally finished up with the clarinet.

In 1944, 1946, and 1953, he recorded and performed in concert with the Chicago jazz pianist and vibraphonist Max Miller; private recordings from Miller's archive have never been released. These concerts and recordings are described in John Chilton's biography Sidney Bechet: The Wizard of Jazz.

With jobs in music difficult to find, he opened a tailor shop with Ladnier. They were visited by musicians and played in the back of the shop. In the 1940s, Bechet played in several bands, but his financial situation did not improve until the end of that decade. By the end of the 1940s, Bechet had tired of struggling to make music in the United States. His contract with Jazz Limited, a Chicago-based record label, was limiting the events at which he could perform (for instance, the label would not permit him to perform at the 1948 Festival of Europe in Nice). He believed the jazz scene in the United States had little left to offer him and was getting stale.

In 1958, Bechet performed as a soloist and with various other renowned musicians including Buck Clayton and Sarah Vaughan in memorable, spirited concerts in the United States Pavilion at Expo 58, the World's Fair in Brussels, Belgium.

=== Permanent settlement in Paris ===
In 1951, he migrated to France permanently, after his performance as a soloist at the Paris Jazz Fair caused a surge in his popularity in that country, where he easily found well-paid work. Also, in 1951, he married Elisabeth Ziegler in Antibes.

Bechet in 1954

In 1953, he signed a recording contract with Disques Vogue that lasted for the rest of his life. He recorded many hit tunes, including "Les Oignons", "Promenade aux Champs-Élysées", and the international hit "Petite Fleur". He also composed a classical ballet score in the late Romantic style of Tchaikovsky called La nuit est une sorcière ("The Night Is a Witch"). Some existentialists in France took to calling him le dieu ("the god").

=== Autobiography and death ===
Shortly before his death, Bechet dictated his autobiography, Treat It Gentle, to Al Rose, a record producer and radio host. He had worked with Rose several times in concert promotions and had a fractious relationship with him. In his autobiography, Bechet's view of himself was starkly different from the one Rose knew.

"The kindly old gentleman in his book was filled with charity and compassion. The one I knew was self-centered, cold, and capable of the most atrocious cruelty, especially toward women."

Though other internet sources have picked up the claim that Bechet dictated his autobiography to Al Rose, the autobiography itself—Treat It Gentle (Twayne, 1960)—notes that "Among those who helped record and edit the tapes on which this book is based are Joan Reid, Desmond Flower, and John Ciardi." The "Foreword" to the book by Desmond Flower explains in detail how the material from the various interviews was put together into book form, and there is no mention of any involvement by Al Rose in the interviewing or editing process.

Although embellished and frequently inaccurate, Treat It Gentle remains a staple account for the "insider's view of the New Orleans tradition".

Bechet died in Garches, near Paris, of lung cancer on May 14, 1959, on his 62nd birthday. He is buried in a local cemetery. Two other major jazz musicians died that year: Billie Holiday and Lester Young.

=== Legacy ===
Popular French singer Patricia Kaas dedicated a song called "A L'Enterrement De Sidney Bechet (The Funeral Of Sidney Bechet)" in which she paid tribute to Sidney Bechet and his work The song was featured on her album Scene de Vie.

In 2013, a crater on Mercury was named after Bechet.

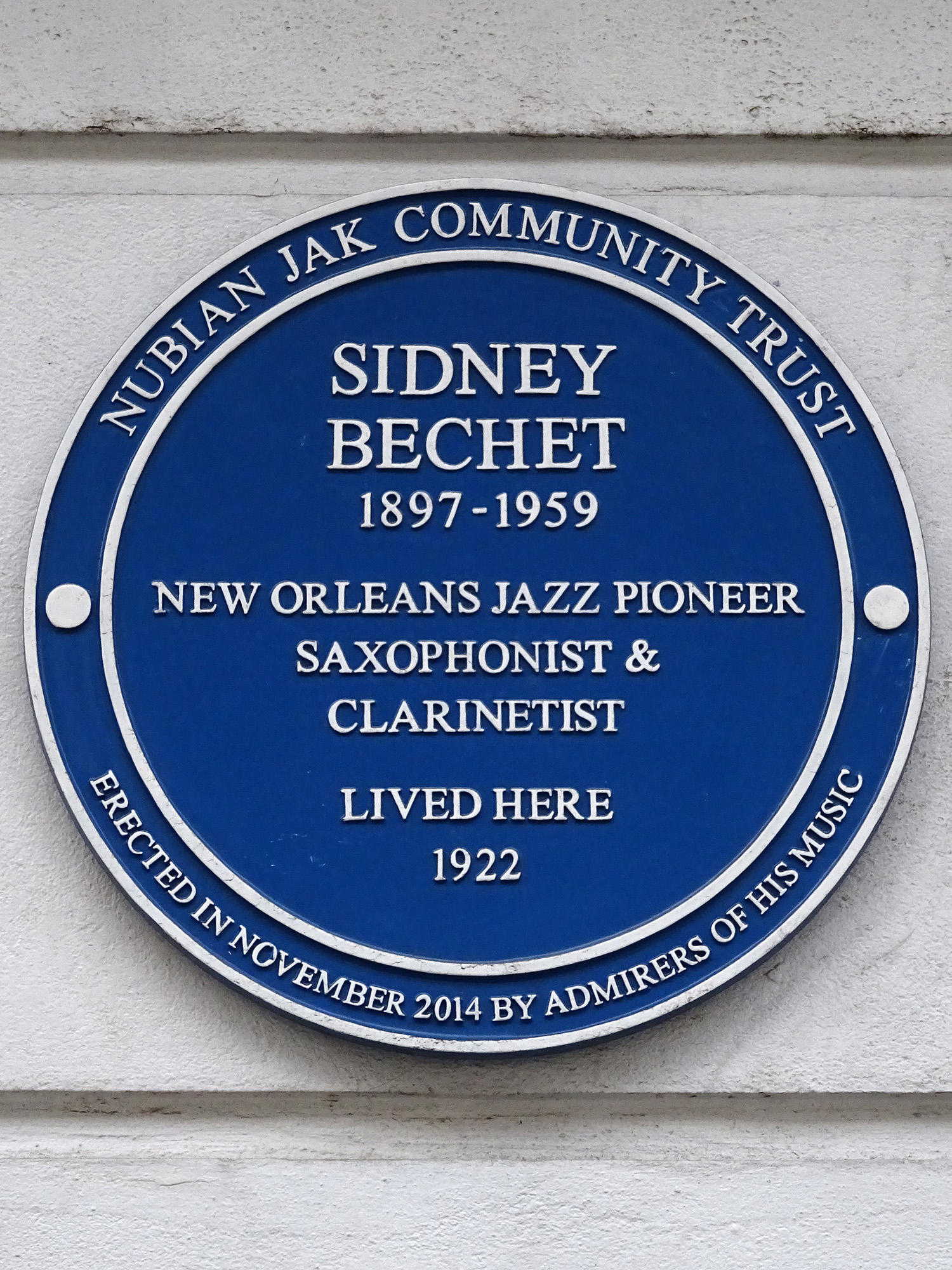
Plaque dedicated to Bechet

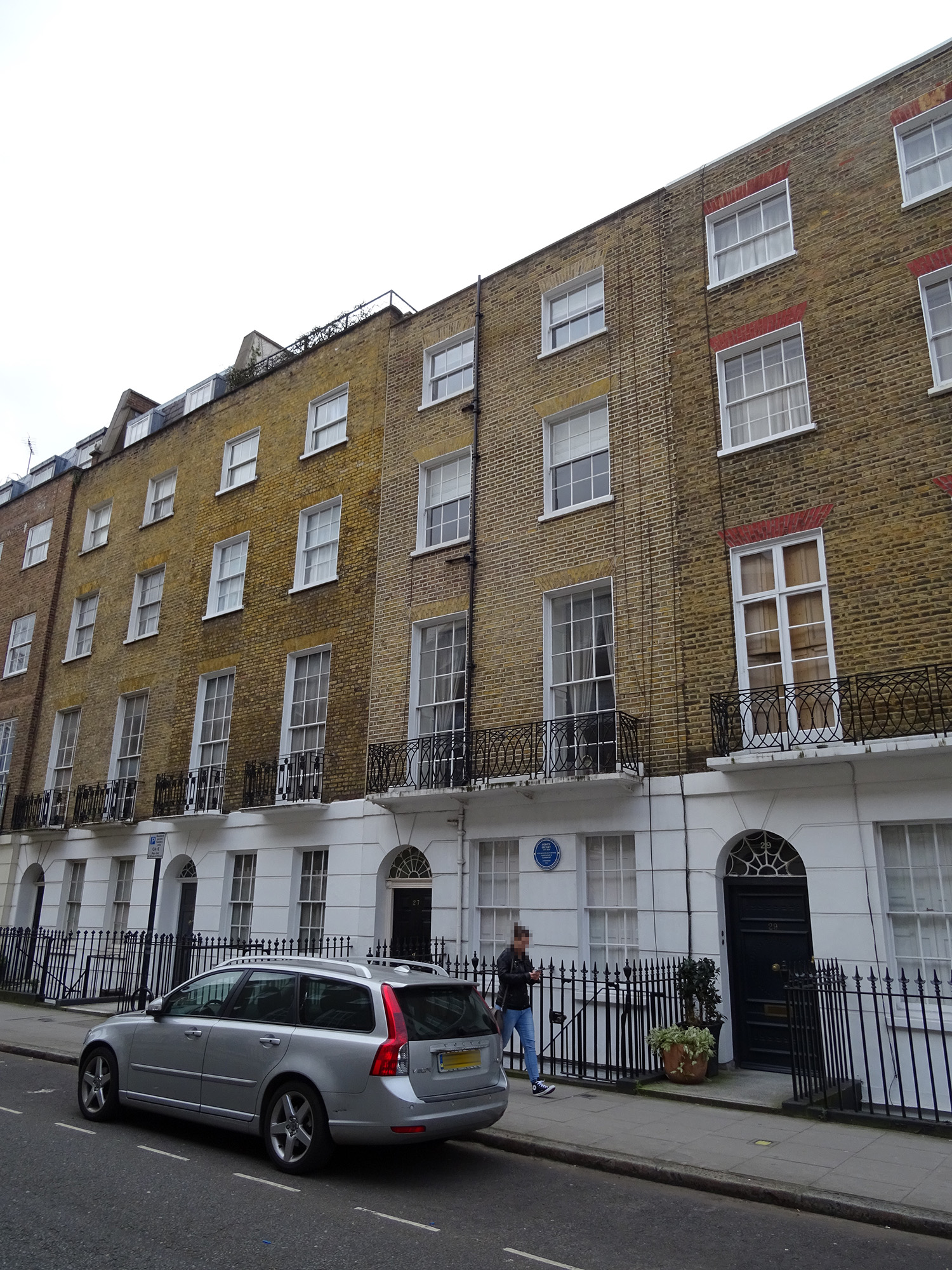
Bechet's former home in London

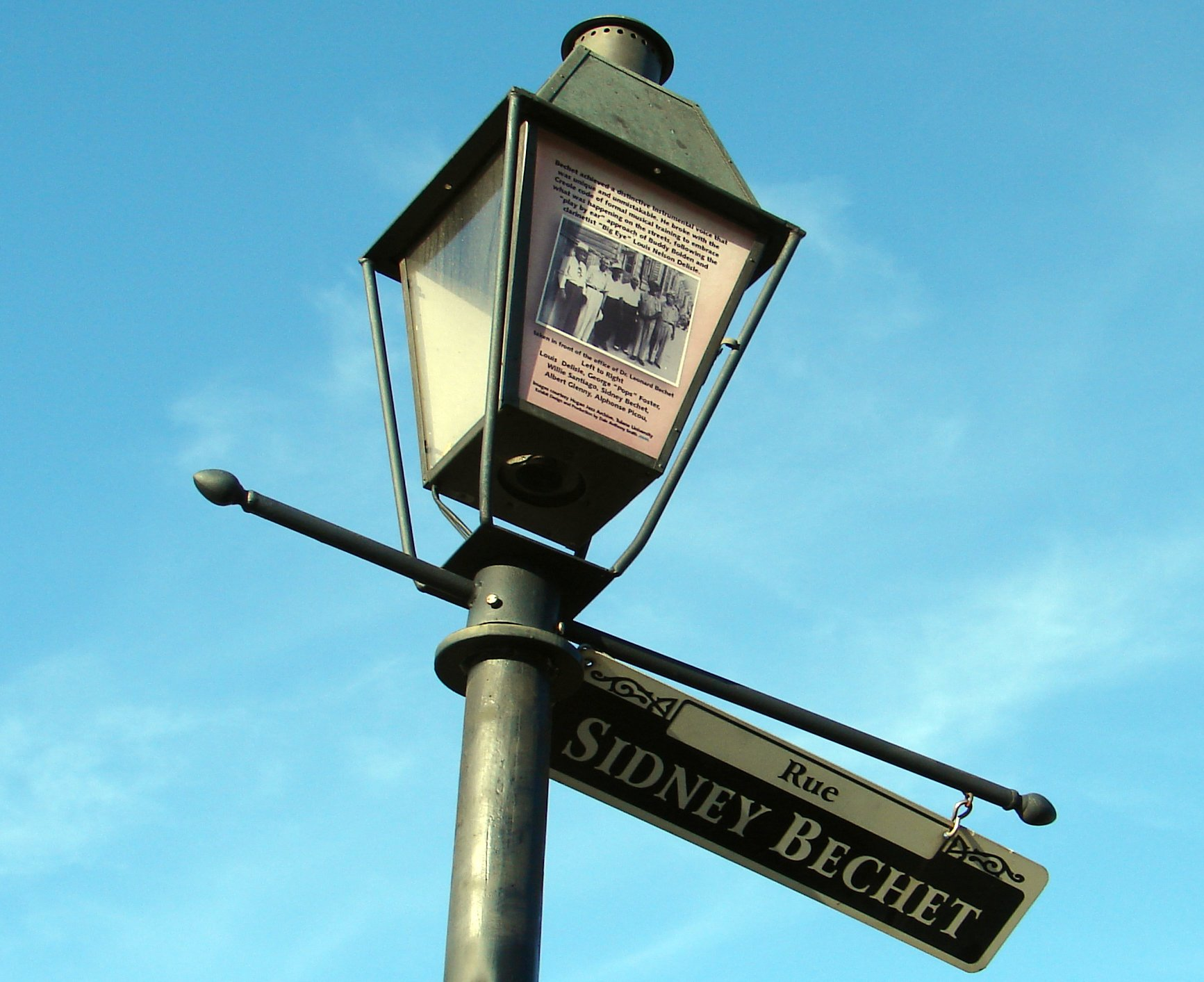
Rue Sidney Bechet in New Orleans

In the novel Steppenwolf by Hermann Hesse, Bechet was the inspiration for the character "Pablo".

Bechet's music has been included in the soundtracks of about 60 films, including the following: Flirting (1991), JFK (1991), Chocolat (2000), The Quiet American (2002), and Midnight in Paris (2011).

Philip Larkin wrote a poem called "For Sidney Bechet". It can be found in The Complete Poems. It is written about on the Philip Larkin Society website.

Van Morrison mentions Sidney Bechet in the song "See Me Through Part II (Just A Closer Walk With Thee)" from the 1990 album Hymns to the Silence: "...Sidney Bechet on Sunday afternoons in winter/Sidney Bechet, Sunday afternoons in winter..."

In Antibes, France, a small one-block park is named Sidney Bechet Square in his honor. The park contains a monument with a bust of Bechet and a plaque that reads, "To Sidney BECHET, one of the world's greatest jazz musicians, so honored by his new home. - Sidney J. BARTHELEMY, Mayor of New Orleans, April 16, 1994."

A fictionalized Sidney Bechet appears in two episodes of George Lucas's The Young Indiana Jones Chronicles portrayed by Jeffrey Wright.

Additionally, in an interview with Woody Allen, when asked what "dead person he would like to have dinner with", he responded, "... I guess maybe Sidney Bechet." Bechet continues to live on in the movies of Allen.

== Personal life ==
Bechet was Catholic.

Bechet was known for having an abrasive attitude, which has been compared to that of Coleman Hawkins. They were both incredibly sure of their relative importance in the music industry during a time in which jazz was losing popularity. They were stubborn and lacked patience with younger artists with less experience or knowledge of the jazz industry.

Bechet briefly took time off from the music industry in 1938 when he opened a tailor shop in New York.

Bechet had three wives: Elizabeth Ziegler (1951–death), Marie-Louise Crawford (1934–1942), and Norma Hale (1918–1929).

== Awards ==
- DownBeat magazine Hall of Fame, 1968
- Bechet was inducted into the Big Band and Jazz Hall of Fame in 1983.
- Awarded a blue plaque outside his former London home in 2014 (pictured).

== Discography ==
=== Singles ===
- "Texas Moaner Blues", with Louis Armstrong, 1924
- "Cake Walkin' Babies from Home", with Red Onion Jazz Babies, 1925
- "Got the Bench, Got the Park (But I Haven't Got You)", 1930
- "Blues in Thirds", 1940
- "Dear Old Southland", 1940
- "Egyptian Fantasy", 1941
- "Muskrat Ramble", 1944
- "Blue Horizon", 1944
- "Dutch Swing College Blues", 1954
- "Kansas City Man Blues", 1954
- "Petite Fleur", 1959
- "Dans les Rues D'Antibes", 1960
- "Premier Bal", 1960
- "Who's Sorry Now", 1961
- "Weary Blues", 1979

=== Albums ===
- A Jazz Masterwork, 1948
- Sidney Bechet & Claude Luter, 1950
- Jazz Classics Vol. 1, 1950
- Jazz Classics Vol. 2, 1950
- Sidney Bechet - Bunk Johnson: Days Beyond Recall, 1951
- Sidney Bechet, Claude Luter: On Parade, 1951
- Sidney Bechet, Claude Luter, Andre Reweliotty et son Orchestre: Bechet-Souvenirs, 1951
- Sidney Bechet, Muggsy Spanier: Jam Session, 1952
- Sidney Bechet, 1952
- Port of Harlem Six, 1952
- Soprano Sax Solos, 1952
- 1941–1944: Sidney Bechet, 1996
- French Movies, 2014

=== Movies ===
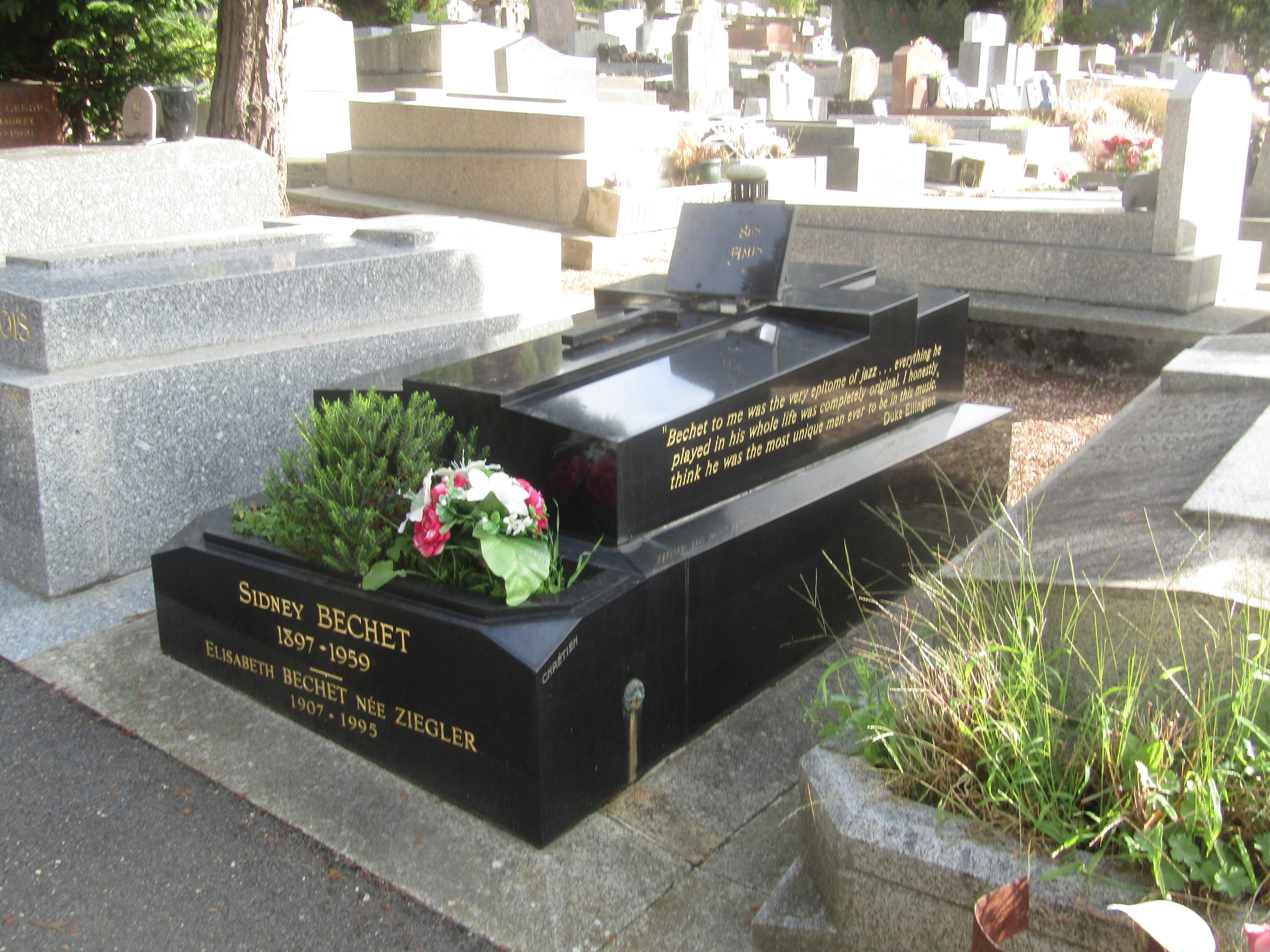
Bechet's grave in Cemetery of Garches, near Paris

Bechet was featured in three films and played a jazz musician.

- Série noire (1955)
- L'inspecteur connaît la musique (1956)
- Ah! Quelle équipe (1957)
