= Lawrence Marrero =

American jazz banjoist (1900–1959)

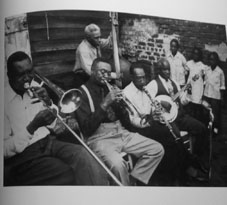
- Marrero on banjo. Photograph by Stanley Kubrick, for Look of June 6, 1950

Background information
- Also known as: Laurence Marrero
- Born: Lawrence Henry Marrero; October 24, 1900; New Orleans, Louisiana, United States
- Died: June 6, 1959 (aged 58)
- Genre: Jazz
- Occupation: Musician
- Instrument: Banjo
- Years active: 1919–1955

Lawrence Henry Marrero (October 24, 1900 – June 6, 1959) was an American jazz banjoist.

== Early life ==
Marrero was born in New Orleans, Louisiana, on October 24, 1900. He grew up in a musical family: three brothers became musicians – Eddie (bass), John (banjo) and Simon (tuba and bass) – and their father Billy was also a bass player. Lawrence (who chose to spell his name "Laurence") was taught music by his father, and became a professional player around 1918.

== Later life and career ==
In 1919 he got his first regular job on banjo with Wooden Joe Nicholas's Camelia Brass Band and from 1920 he joined on bass drum the Young Tuxedo Brass Band.

In 1942 Marrero was one of the musicians who part of the first recordings made by Bunk Johnson, and continued playing and recording in the New Orleans jazz revival. He was featured on many recordings and was a regular member of the George Lewis band from the late 1930s until ill health caused him to quit full-time performance in 1954. He occasionally played with his own band after that.

Marrero was considered to be a steady player with a good tone; he never recorded as a leader and rarely did he take solos. He died in New Orleans on June 6, 1959.
