= Wooden Joe Nicholas =

American jazz trumpeter and cornetist (1883–1957)

- Born: September 23, 1883; New Orleans, Louisiana, United States
- Died: November 17, 1957 (aged 74); New Orleans, Louisiana, United States
- Genres: Jazz
- Occupation: Instrumentalist
- Instrument(s): Trumpet, cornet

Wooden Joe Nicholas (September 23, 1883 – November 17, 1957) was an American jazz trumpeter and cornetist, active on the early New Orleans jazz scene.

He was born in New Orleans, Louisiana, United States. Nicholas began playing professionally on clarinet, and continued occasionally doubling on it in later years after he had mostly switched to cornet. Nicholas knew Buddy Bolden and said Bolden was the main influence on his cornet style, but did not begin playing cornet until 1915 when he was playing clarinet with King Oliver, and started playing around with Oliver's cornet while Oliver was on break.

He lived nearly his entire life in New Orleans, and played in many brass bands and street ensembles in the city for decades, in addition to forming the Camelia Brass Band in 1918. He was famed for his volume and his endurance, though these are not evident on most of his recordings (a notable exception being his driving version of "Shake It and Break It", American Music Records MX 800). Nicholas did not record until 1945, when he was 62 years old. He recorded again in 1949 as a leader, in addition to playing with Raymond Burke.

Nicholas died in New Orleans in November 1957. He was the uncle of clarinetist Albert Nicholas.
