= Buddie Petit =

American early jazz cornetist (c. 1896–1931)

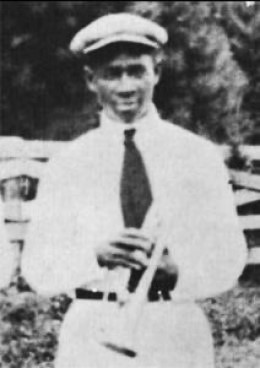
- Buddie Petit, 1920

Background information
- Born: Joseph Crawford; White Castle, Louisiana, United States
- Died: July 4, 1931
- Genres: Jazz
- Occupation: Musician
- Instrument: Cornet

Buddie Petit (born Joseph Crawford; most likely 1896 or 1897 — July 4, 1931), also spelled Buddy Petit, was an American early jazz cornetist.

His year of birth has been given in various sources as ranging from 1887 to 1897. He gave December 23, 1896 as his date of birth on his signed WWI Draft Card. He was born Joseph Crawford in White Castle, Iberville Parish, Louisiana but was adopted by the trombonist Joseph Petit, whose surname he took.

He took Freddie Keppard's place in the Eagle Band (a place earlier held by Buddy Bolden) when Keppard left town. He was briefly lured to Los Angeles by Jelly Roll Morton and Bill Johnson in 1917, but he objected to being told to dress and behave differently from what he was accustomed to and returned to New Orleans. He spent the rest of his career in the area around greater New Orleans, and the towns north of Lake Pontchartrain, not venturing further from home than Baton Rouge and the Mississippi Gulf Coast.

Okeh Records offered him a chance to record on their 1925 field trip to New Orleans, but Petit held out for more money and was never recorded. Danny Barker and Louis Armstrong said that it was a great loss to jazz history that there are no recordings of Petit.

He died on July 4, 1931, reportedly after "over-indulging" in food and drink.
