= Johnny Dodds =

American jazz clarinetist and saxophonist (1892–1940)

- Born: April 12, 1892; New Orleans, Louisiana, U.S.
- Died: August 8, 1940 (aged 48) Chicago, Illinois, U.S.
- Genres: Dixieland; Jazz
- Occupation: Musician
- Instruments: Clarinet, saxophone

Johnny Dodds (/dɒdz/; April 12, 1892 – August 8, 1940) was an American jazz clarinetist and alto saxophonist based in New Orleans, best known for his recordings under his own name and with bands such as those of Joe "King" Oliver, Jelly Roll Morton, Lovie Austin and Louis Armstrong. Dodds was the older brother of drummer Warren "Baby" Dodds, one of the first important jazz drummers. They worked together in the New Orleans Bootblacks in 1926. Dodds is an important figure in jazz history. He was the premier clarinetist of his era and, in recognition of his artistic contributions, he was posthumously inducted into the Jazz Hall of Fame. He has been described as "a prime architect in the creation of the Jazz Age."

== Biography ==
Dodds was born in New Orleans, Louisiana. His childhood environment was a musical one. His father and uncle were violinists, his sister played a melodeon, and in adolescence Johnny sang high tenor in the family quartet. According to legend, his instrumental skill began with a toy flute which had been purchased for his brother, Warren "Baby" Dodds. He was known for his serious and reserved manner as well as his "funky blues playing," which earned him the nickname "toilet."

He moved to New Orleans in 1909 and studied the clarinet with Lorenzo Tio Jr. and Charlie McCurdy. He played with the bands of Frankie Duson, Kid Ory, and Joe "King" Oliver. Dodds went to Chicago and played with Oliver's Creole Jazz Band, with which he first recorded in 1923. Dodds blamed the breakup on not wanting to travel and on musical conflicts due to Oliver's failing musical abilities. He also worked frequently with his good friend Natty Dominique during this period, a professional relationship that would last a lifetime. After the breakup of Oliver's band in 1924, Dodds replaced Alcide Nunez as the house clarinetist and bandleader of Kelly's Stables. From 1924 to 1930, Dodds worked regularly at Kelly's Stables in Chicago. He recorded with numerous small groups in Chicago, including Louis Armstrong's Hot Five and Hot Seven and Jelly Roll Morton's Red Hot Peppers. He also recorded prolifically under his own name, Johnny Dodds' Black Bottom Stompers, between 1927 and 1929 for Paramount, Brunswick/Vocalion, and Victor. He became a big star on the Chicago jazz scene of the 1920s, but his career precipitously declined with the Great Depression. Although his career gradually recovered, he did not record for most of the 1930s, affected by ill-health; he recorded only two sessions—January 21, 1938, and June 5, 1940—both for Decca. On August 8, 1940, Dodds died of a stroke in his Chicago home and was buried at Lincoln Cemetery in Blue Island, Illinois.

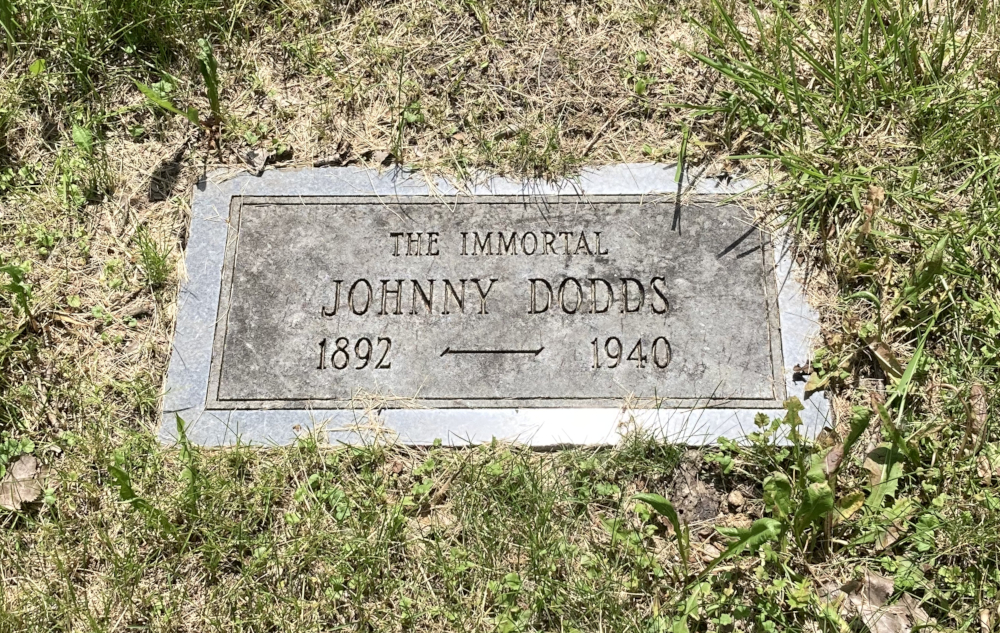
Dodds' grave at Lincoln Cemetery

Known for his professionalism and virtuosity as a musician and his heartfelt, heavily blues-laden style, Dodds was an important influence on later clarinetists, such as Benny Goodman, who stated that no one ever surpassed Dodds in achieving a finer tone with the clarinet. The tone was probably caused by the use of double embouchure (lower and upper lips over the mouthpiece) in combination with a very hard reed (a thin piece of cane resting against the mouthpiece) according to CDK Cook in the Syncophated Times May 10, 2020. Dodds was inducted into the DownBeat Jazz Hall of Fame in 1987.

== Sibling rivalry ==
Several accounts suggest the Dodds brothers did not always get along. When the brothers were young children, Johnny received a clarinet from his father while Baby did not get a drum even though he asked for one. In The Baby Dodds Story, Baby Dodds discusses his jealousy of his older brother when they were children. As they grew up, Johnny refused to let Baby play music with him because Baby was a heavy drinker and Johnny did not drink. When Joe Oliver hired Baby to join his band and Johnny realized how much Baby's talent as a drummer had grown, Johnny changed his mind. Although they continued to argue about Baby's excessive drinking, they grew closer as brothers and musicians. Baby was greatly affected by his brother's death.

== Discography ==
Releases featuring Johnny Dodds include the following.

- 1926-00 - The Chronological (Classics589#, 1991)
- 1927-00 - The Chronological (Classics603#, 1991)
- 1927-28 - The Chronological (Classics617#, 1991)
- 1928-40 - The Chronological (Classics#635, 1992)
- 1927-29 - Johnny Dodds On Paramount (2xCD) (Frog, 2011) Complete Paramount sides as leader and sideman
- 1927 - Johnny Dodds, Vol. 1 (Riverside RLP-1015, 1953) Paramount recs
- 1927 - Johnny Dodds, Vol. 2 (Riverside RLP-1002, 1953) Paramount Recs reissued as In the Alley (Riverside; 1961)
- 1925-27 - The Immortal Johnny Dodds (Milestone M-2002, 1972) Gennett and Paramount recs
- 1926-29 - Chicago Mess Around (Milestone M-2011, 1972) with Lovie Austin, Blind Blake, Ida Cox
- 1926-29 Johnny Dodds and Kid Ory (Columbia 16004; 1953) Columbia and Okeh recs
- 1926-29 – The Complete Johnny Dodds (RCA 741110/111, 1974) Victor Recs
- 1926-29 - Sixteen Rare Recordings (RCA PV-558, 1968) Victor Recs
- 1928-39 - Blue Clarinet Stomp (RCA Bluebird 2293–2, 1990) Victor recs
- 1927-29 - South Side Chicago Jazz (MCA MCAD-42326, 1989) Brunswick, Vocalion, Decca Recs
- 1926-1938 - King of New Orleans Clarinet (1926-1938) (Brunswick BL-58016, ?) Brunswick Recs

Compilations

- 1926-40 - Myth of New Orleans (Giants of Jazz 53077, 1986)
- 1923–40 - An Introduction to. His Best Recordings 1923-1940 (Best of Jazz 4014; 1994)
- 1923–40 - Wild Man Blues: His 24 Greatest (ASV/Living Era 5252, 1997)
- 1923–29 - Great Original Performances 1923–1929 (Louisiana Red Hot 622, 1998)

78 rpm (incomplete)

- Johnny Dodds & Tiny Parham, Paramount 261201.
- Dixieland Jug Blowers, Victor 261211.
- Johnny Dodds & Tiny Parham, Paramount 270401.
- Johnny Dodds Trio, Vocalion 270421.
- Dodds Black Bottom Stompers, Vocalion 270422.
- Dodds Black Bottom Stompers, Vocalion 271008.
- Johnny Dodds Trio, Victor 280705.
- Johnny Dodds' Washboard Band, Victor 280796.
- Johnny Dodds' Orchestra, Victor 290116.
- Johnny Dodds' Orchestra, Victor 290130.
- Johnny Dodds' Orchestra, Victor 290207.
- Johnny Dodds' Trio, Victor 290207.
- Johnny Dodds' Orchestra, Victor 290207.
- Johnny Dodds' Chicago Boys, Decca 380121.
- Johnny Dodds' Orchestra, Decca 400605.

== Bibliography ==
- Klatzko, Bernard (1999). "The Most Complete Biography of Johnny Dodds". 78 Quarterly. Vol. 1, no. 10.
- Lambert, George Edmund (1961). Kings of Jazz: Johnny Dodds. New York: Cassell. ASIN B000QRYGF2.
- Rust, Brian (1982). Shaw, Malcolm (ed.). Jazz Records 1897–1942 (5th ed.). Storyville Publications. ISBN 9780902391048.
- Dodds, Baby; Gara, Larry (1992). The Baby Dodds Story: As Told to Larry Gara. Louisiana State University Press. ISBN 9780807117569.
- Spencer, Frederick J. (2002). Jazz and Death: Medical Profiles of Jazz Greats. University Press of Mississippi.
- Dicaire, David (August 12, 2003). Jazz Musicians of the Early Years, to 1945. McFarland. ISBN 978-0-7864-8556-7.
