= Manuel Perez (musician) =

American jazz cornetist and bandleader (1871–1946)

Emanuel Perez (December 28, 1871 – 1946) was an American early New Orleans jazz cornetist and bandleader.

== Life ==
Some details of his early life remain obscure. He was born into a Creole of Color family of Spanish, French and African descent. One of his ancestors was an officer of the free black regiment which fought in the Battle of New Orleans.

At the turn of the century, Perez became a member of the Onward Brass Band, leading it from 1903 to 1930. He also started his own brass band, called the Imperial Orchestra, which operated from 1901–08. The Onward Brass Band was one of the most respected of its day. Some of the best-known players in New Orleans were a part of the group, including King Oliver, Peter Bocage, Lorenzo Tio, George Baquet, Isidore Barbarin, and Benny Williams. The Perez-Oliver two cornet, or "trumpet" team, was one of the most renowned in New Orleans. Perez was known for his beautiful tone, staying close to the lead, while Oliver improvised variations as a second cornet part.

Later, Perez went north to Chicago in 1915, playing with Charles Elgar's Creole Orchestra at the Arsonia Cafe and also with the Arthur Sims Band. Although Elgar and his Creole Orchestra recorded a few sides (albums) during this period, Perez is not heard on any of these early recordings.

Returning to the Crescent City in the 1920s, he played in the District (Storyville), on steamboat excursions with Fate Marable, and in parades with the Maple Leaf Orchestra. Perez suffered a stroke in 1930. During this period, he worked with his brother, who owned a moving company, while he ran the used furniture store.

Sidney Bechet said of him in the early 1940s:

I was down in New Orleans and I saw Manuel before he died. I saw him and I couldn't bear to see him; it was something awful. He just began to slobber at the mouth when you spoke to him...And when he looked at you there wasn't anything in his eyes … it was like they were missing from his face, and his face, it had just come apart.

Perez suffered a series of strokes that left him disabled and caused his death in 1946.

== Style and legacy ==
Louis Armstrong stated "Manuel and Joe King Oliver played together in the Onward Brass Band, really something to listen to when they played for parades and funerals. They had twelve musicians in their brass band. Eddie Jackson used to really swing the tuba when the band played marches. They sounded like a forty piece brass swing band." Armstrong would follow the brass band in the second line, as he listened to those early musicians whom he idolized in his youth.

In contrast to Buddy Bolden and his more improvisational free approach, Perez was a sight-reader and highly technical musician, some say he refined the play of Bolden and allowed for more of an orchestral (big band) style. Sidney Bechet comments "Manuel Perez was one. He was a musicianer; he was sincere. He stuck to his instrument." In the terminology of early 20th century New Orleans musicians, a "musicianer" was someone with good technical ability on their instrument adept at sight-reading written music.

Manuel Perez was an innovator, with a supreme sound. His legacy might be best understood, in looking at the musicians that praised him, and the styles he influenced. King Oliver went on to become the jazz impresario of Chicago. Sidney Bechet toured the world featuring some of the same sounds Perez himself had played while battling other bands on the neutral ground of Claiborne Avenue, and sitting solitary on the banks of the Mississippi River.

== Other sources ==
- Bechet, Sidney. Treat it Gentle.
- Armstrong, Louis. In his own words: selected writings.
