= Rift (disambiguation) =

A rift is a geological structure.

Rift(s) or The Rift may also refer to:

== Film and television ==
- The Rift (1990 film), a film directed by Juan Piquer Simón
- Rift (2017 film), a film directed by Erlingur Thoroddsen
- Rift (2019 film), a 2019 Nigerian film directed by Biodun Stephen
- Cardiff Rift or The Rift, a fictional wormhole in the Doctor Who universe

== Games ==
- Rift (video game), a 2011 massively multiplayer online role-playing game
- Rifts (role-playing game), 1990 multi-genre role-playing game created by Kevin Siembieda
- Rifts: Promise of Power, a 2005 video game
- Chasm: The Rift, a 1997 video game for MS-DOS
- Far Gate, development title The Rift, a 2001 computer game

== Literature ==
- The Rift (Allan novel), a 2017 novel by Nina Allan
- The Rift (Williams novel), a 1999 novel by Walter Jon Williams
- The Rift (Star Trek), a 1991 novel by Peter David
- Avatar: The Last Airbender – The Rift, a 2014 graphic novel
- The Rift (Richards novel), a 2025 novel by Douglas E. Richards and Joshua T. Calvert

== Music ==
- Rift (album), a 1993 album by Phish
- "Rift", a song by Northlane from the 2019 album Alien
- "The Rift", a song by Wolfheart from the 2017 album Tyhjyys
- Rifts (album), a 2009 album by Oneohtrix Point Never

== Other uses ==
- Rift, West Virginia, US, an unincorporated community
- Oculus Rift, a virtual reality head-mounted display
- Reactor-In-Flight-Test, a planned phase of the NERVA rocket engine development program

== See also ==
- Great Rift Valley (disambiguation)
- Rift valley (disambiguation)
