= St. Roch Market =

Coordinates: 29.96941°N 90.05219°W

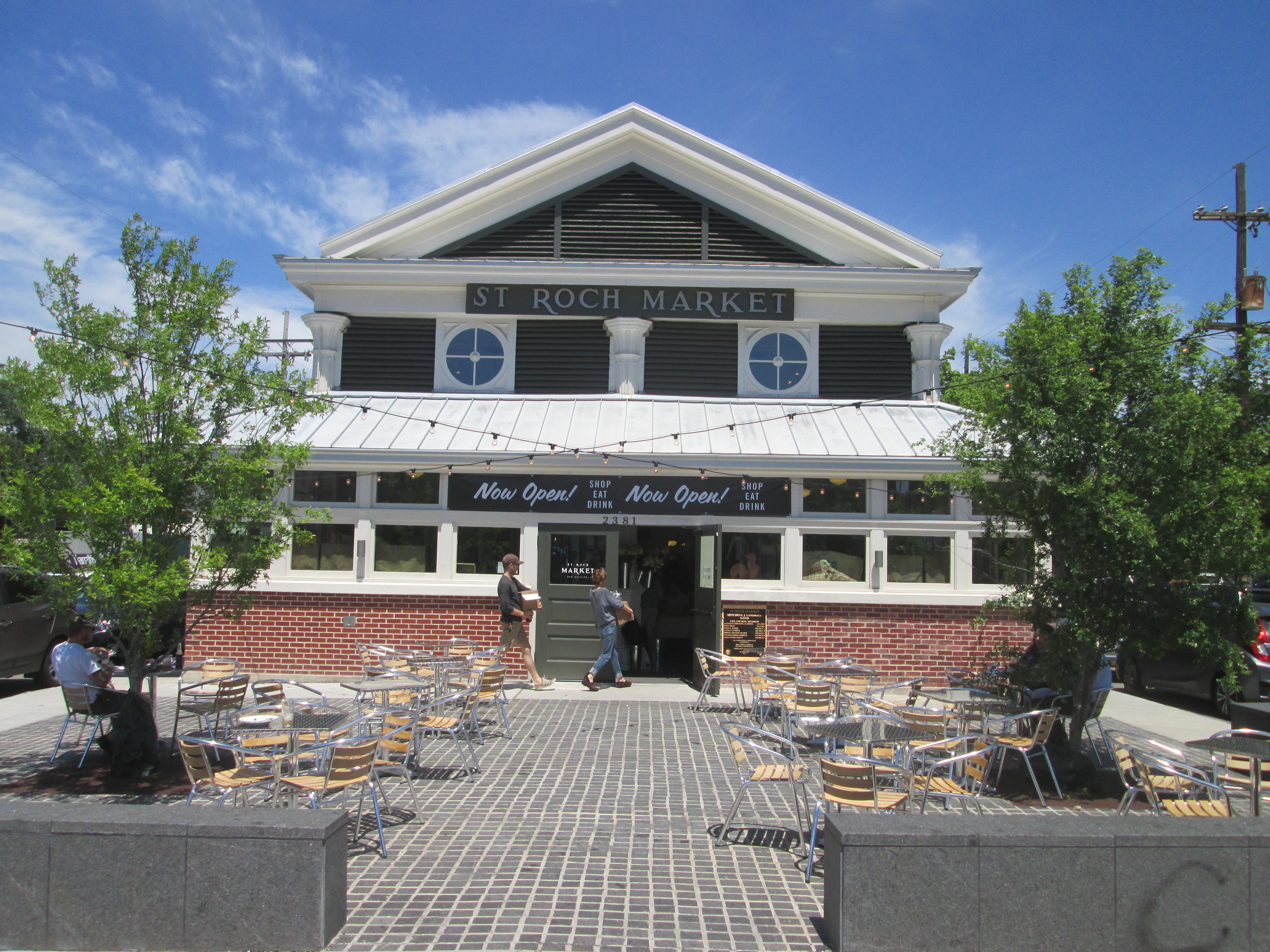
St. Roch Market shortly after its April 2015 reopening

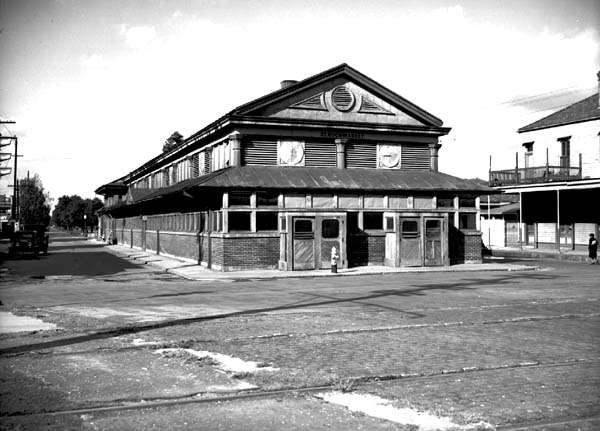
Exterior, 1937, shortly before WPA repairs and modernization

The St. Roch Market is a building on the median of St. Roch Avenue facing St. Claude Avenue in New Orleans. It was built in 1875, with extensive renovations in 1937-1938 and 2012-2015.

The ancestor of what became the St. Roch Market was a city market originally constructed in 1838 in the "New Marigny" neighborhood of New Orleans, Louisiana, United States, as an open-air market on Washington Avenue (later renamed St Roch Avenue). The neighborhood itself was originally called the "New Marigny", an extension of the slightly older Faubourg Marigny neighborhood on the other side of St. Claude Avenue. After a yellow fever epidemic in the early 1870s in which many neighborhood residents survived, the street, neighborhood, and the market itself was renamed as the St. Roch neighborhood after Saint Roch for the saint's patronage of incurable diseases and lost causes.

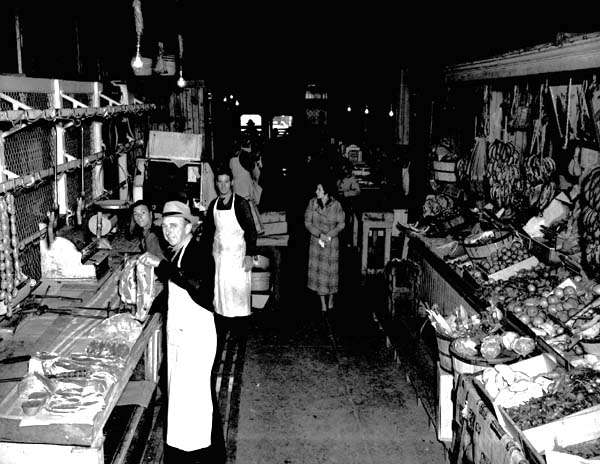
Interior, October 1937, before WPA renovations

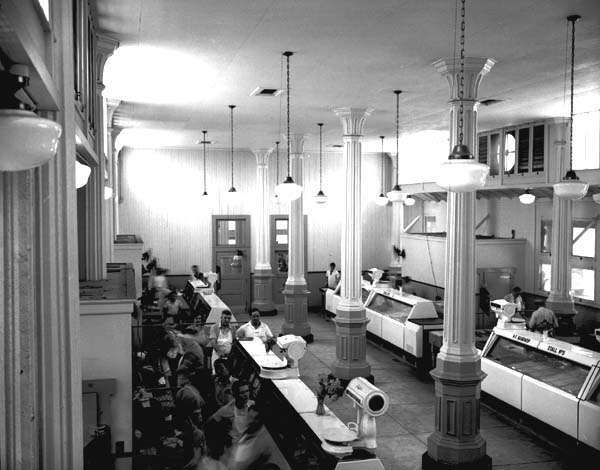
Interior, July 1938, after WPA renovations

The building itself has been renovated several times. In 1875, the current building was constructed and the market renamed the St Roch Market (post epidemic). It was next renovated and enclosed after World War I. Then in the 1930s through the Works Progress Administration, the building was once again restored and extensively remodeled. Up until the 1950s the market had been a multi-vendor market selling fresh produce, prepared foods, butchered items, and sundries of all varieties. After World War II, it was renovated to again and became the popular Lama's Supermarket, predominantly known for seafood and plate meals.

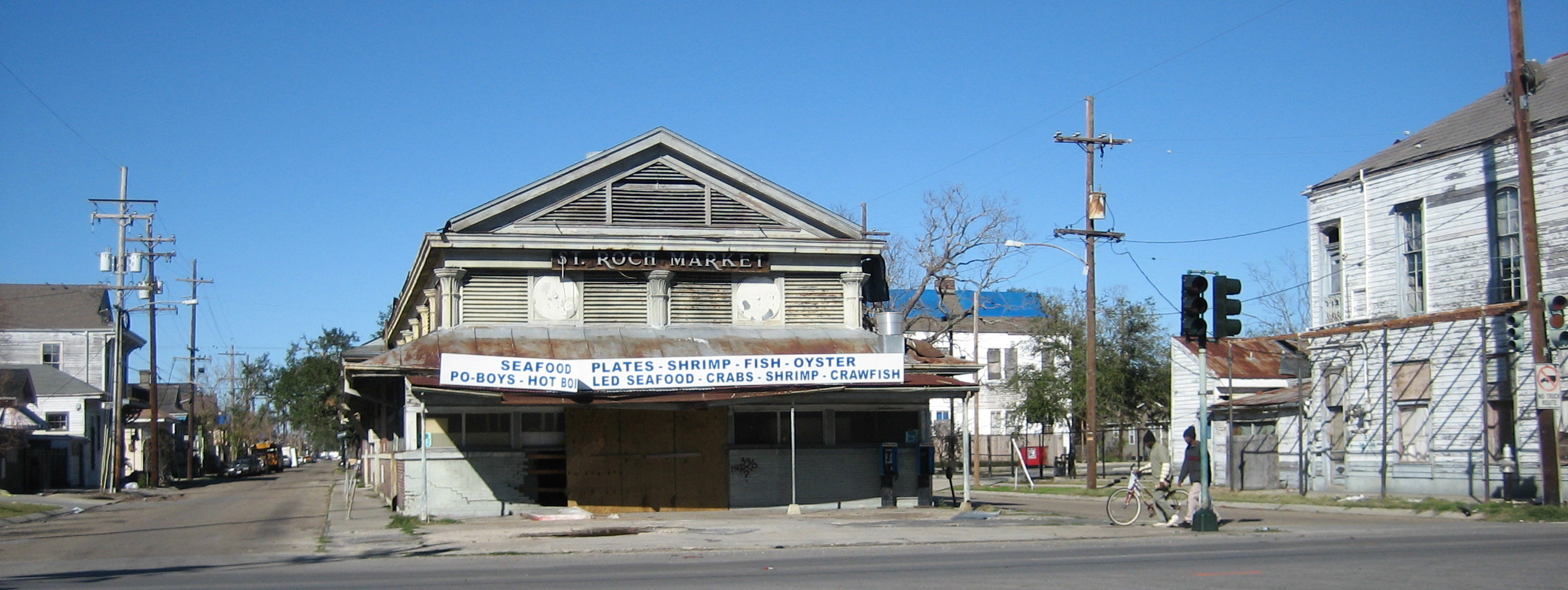
Shuttered St. Roch Market with its pre-Katrina signage, January 2006

In the 1990s it had fallen into disrepair, but was still an active part of the neighborhood. For a time it housed a Chinese food restaurant. In 2005 it was serving inexpensive seafood and po-boy sandwiches until the evacuation of the city for Hurricane Katrina. Like most of the city it was damaged in the hurricane and extensive Federal levee failure floods that followed, and the market did not reopen. In the 10 years that followed Katrina the building was gutted but sat vacant until 2012, when the city of New Orleans, under Mayor Mitch Landrieu began a campaign to obtain state and federal funding to restore the building. In August 2014 the city leased the building to a private business who returned the building to a multi-tenant "food hall" which is a modernization of the building's original use selling both prepared and fresh foods in a multi-vendor format.

Now, the St. Roch Market is a southern food hall featuring a diverse lineup of food and beverage purveyors.
