= Frenchmen Street =

Street in New Orleans, Louisiana, United States

Frenchmen Street is a street in the 7th Ward of New Orleans, Louisiana. It is best known for the three-block section in the Faubourg Marigny neighborhood which since the 1980s has developed as the center of many popular live-music venues.

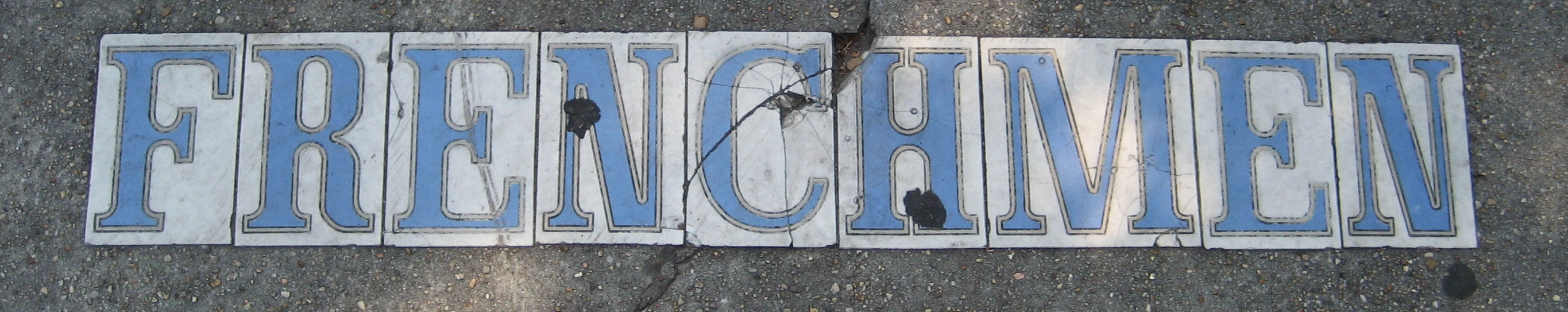
Frenchmen Street tiles

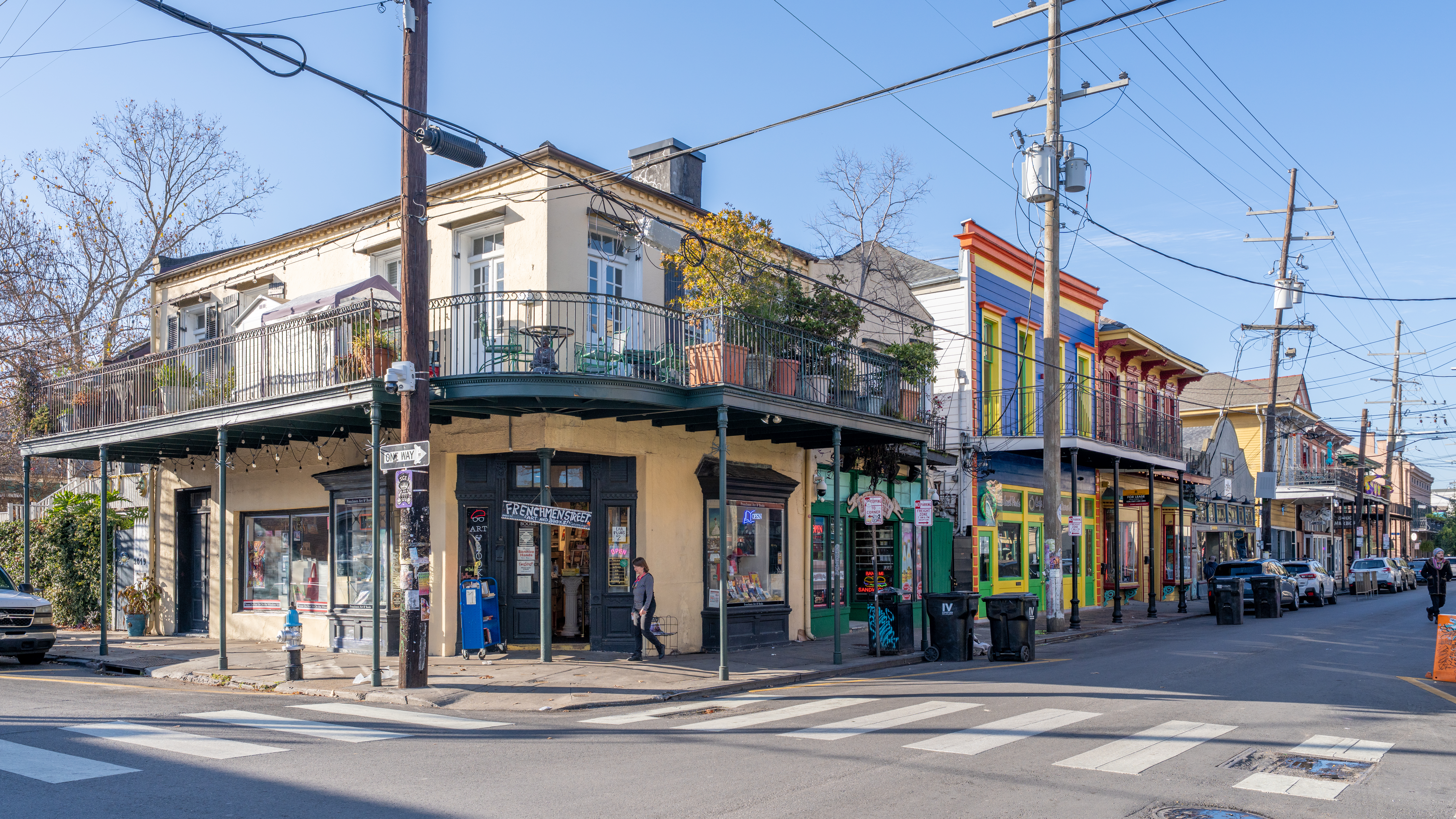
Corner of Frenchmen Street & Chartres Street, in Faubourg Marigny

Frenchmen Street runs from the intersection with Esplanade Avenue just inland from the Mississippi River, back to the Gentilly neighborhood.

== History ==
In 1806 local landowner Bernard de Marigny, subdivided his property in 1806 to sell lots and develop a residential area. Many of the remaining houses in this area were built during the nineteenth century and are more than 100 years old; some are much older. Frenchmen Street "was named after six French men who were executed after leading the Louisiana Rebellion of 1768 after France ceded Louisiana to Spain following its defeat by Great Britain in the Seven Years' War.

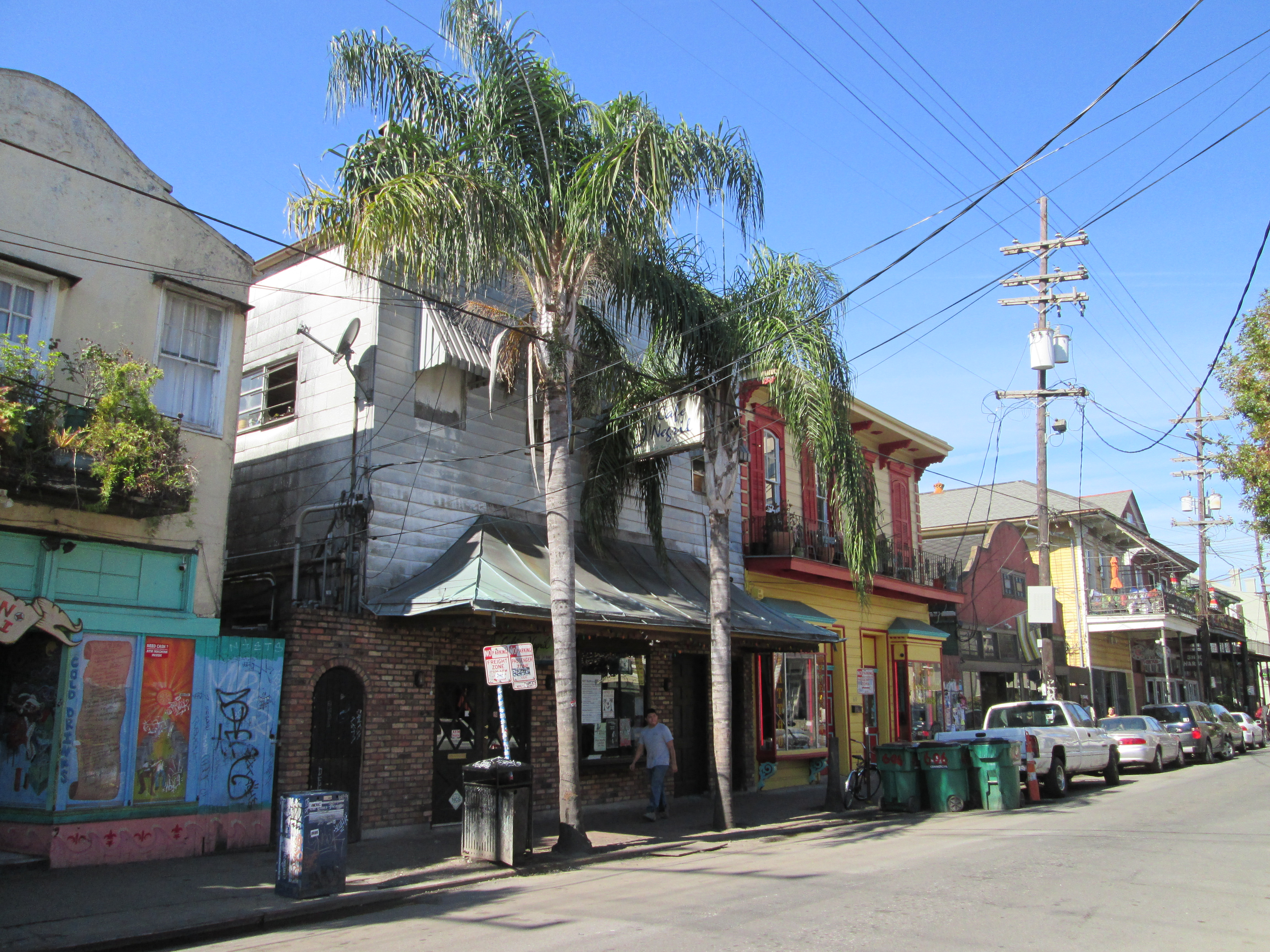
Frenchmen Street entertainment district

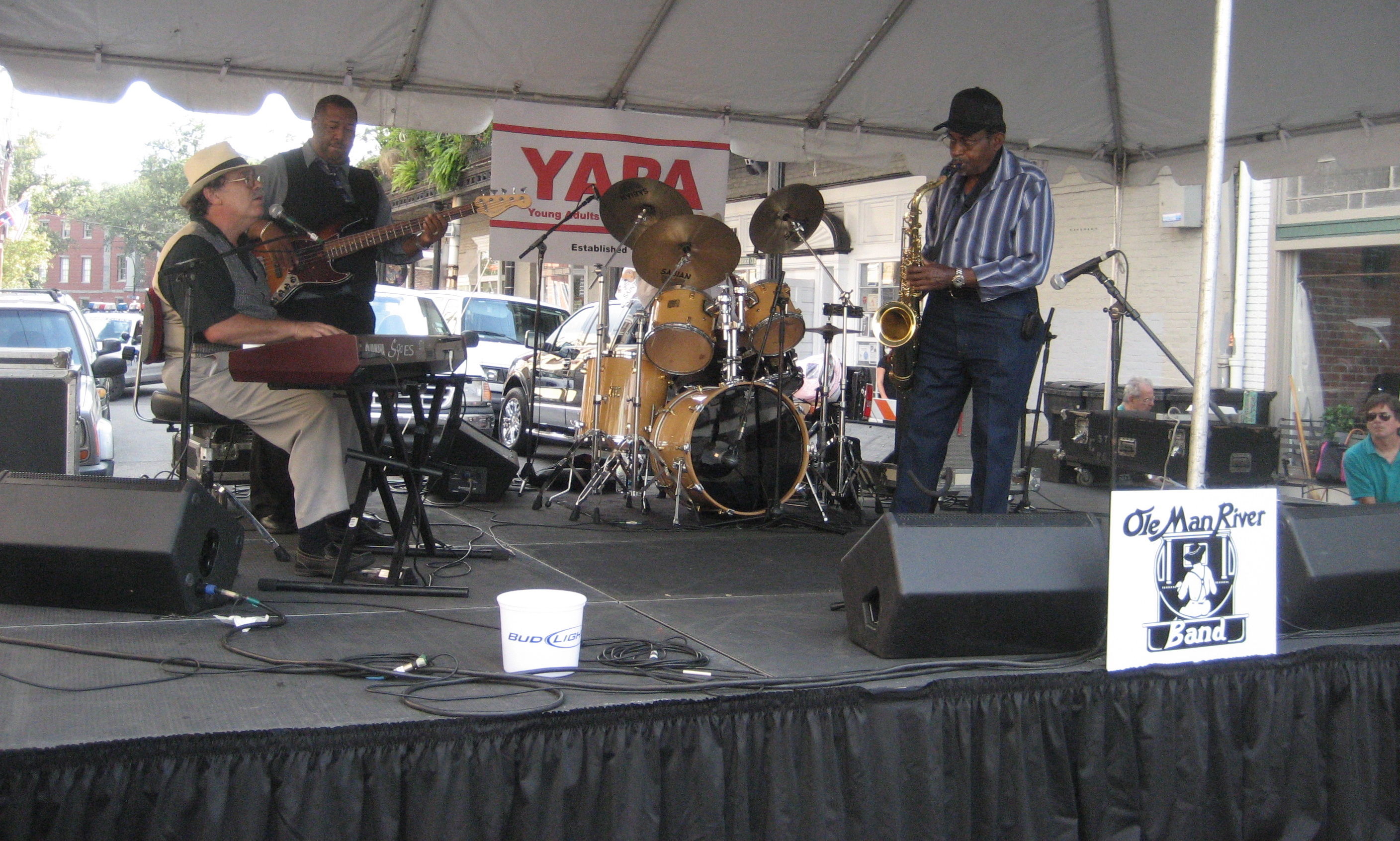
Ole Man River Band, Frenchmen Street

== See also ==
- List of streets of New Orleans
