= Fairgrounds, New Orleans =

Fairgrounds
- New Orleans Neighborhood
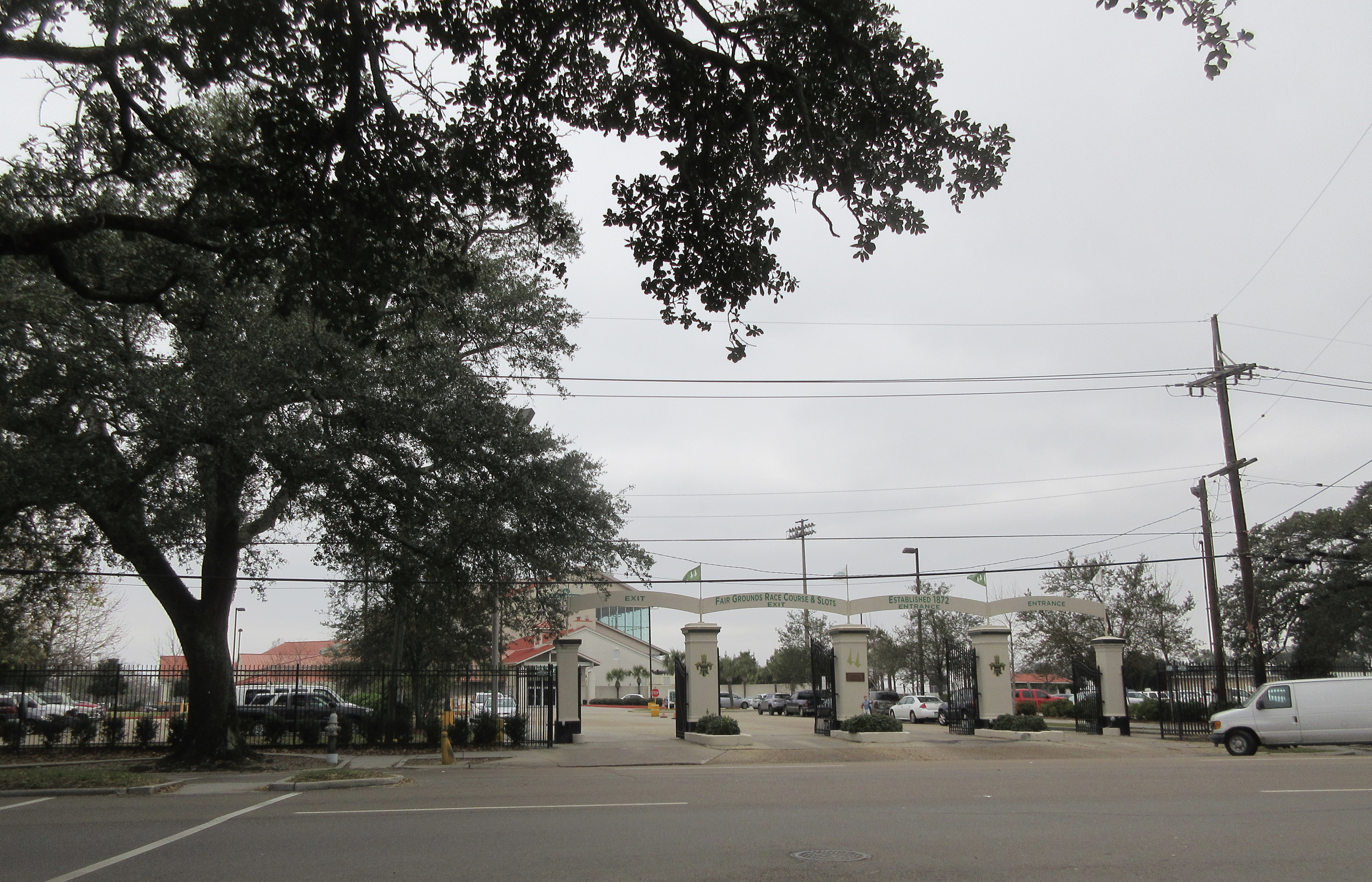
- The fairgrounds from which the neighborhood takes its name
- Interactive map of Fairgrounds
- Coordinates: 29°59′10″N 90°04′42″W
- Country: United States
- State: Louisiana
- City: New Orleans
- Planning District: District 4, Mid-City District

Area
  - Total: 0.87 sq mi (2.3 km^{2})
  - Land: 0.87 sq mi (2.3 km^{2})
  - Water: 0.00 sq mi (0 km^{2})
- Elevation: 0 ft (0 m)

Population (2010)
  - Total: 3,000
  - Density: 3,400/sq mi (1,300/km^{2})
- Time zone: UTC-6 (CST)
  - Summer (DST): UTC-5 (CDT)
- Area code: 504

Fairgrounds is a neighborhood of the city of New Orleans. A subdistrict of the Mid-City District Area, its boundaries as defined by the New Orleans City Planning Commission are: Florida Avenue, Dugue, Treasure, Republic and Abundance Streets to the north, North Broad Street to the east, Esplanade Avenue to the south and Bayou St. John to the west.

== Geography ==
According to the United States Census Bureau, the district has a total area of 0.87 square miles (2.3 km^{2}), 0.87 square miles (2.3 km^{2}) of which is land and 0.00 square miles (0.0 km^{2}) (0.0%) of which is water.

=== Adjacent neighborhoods ===
- St. Bernard Projects (north)
- St. Roch (north)
- Seventh Ward (east)
- Bayou St. John (south)
- City Park (west)

=== Boundaries ===
The New Orleans City Planning Commission defines the boundaries of Fairgrounds as these streets: Florida Avenue, Dugue Street, Treasure Street, Republic Street, Abundance Street, North Broad Street, Esplanade Avenue and Bayou St. John.

== Landmarks and cityscape ==
Neighborhood landmarks include the Fair Grounds Race Course which gives the neighborhood its name, and Saint Louis Cemetery #3.

The remainder of the neighborhood is predominantly residential, with some local businesses along Esplanade Avenue, Ponce de Leon Street, and Gentilly Road.

== Demographics ==
As of the census of 2000, there were 6,575 people, 2,983 households, and 1,551 families living in the neighborhood. The population density was 7,558 /mi^{2} (2,859 /km^{2}).

As of the census of 2010, there were 5,192 people, 2,496 households, and 1,162 families living in the neighborhood.

== See also ==
- New Orleans neighborhoods
