= 7th Ward of New Orleans =

Seventh Ward 7th Ward
- Neighborhood
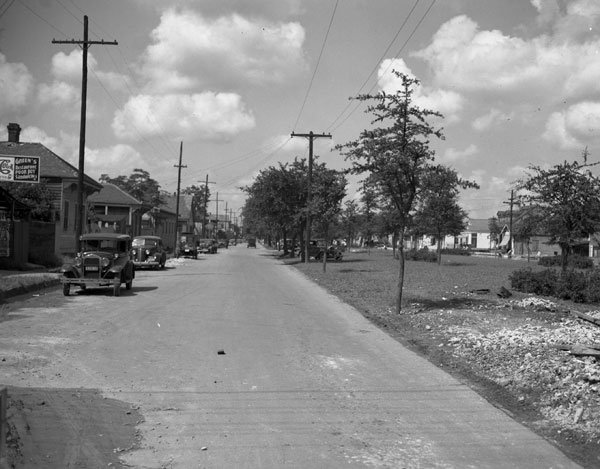
- Claiborne Avenue at Frenchmen Street, 1938
- Interactive map of Seventh Ward
- Coordinates: 29°58′38″N 90°03′56″W
- Country: United States
- State: Louisiana
- City: New Orleans
- Planning District: District 4, Mid-City District

Area
  - Total: 1.16 sq mi (3.0 km^{2})
  - Land: 1.16 sq mi (3.0 km^{2})
  - Water: 0.00 sq mi (0 km^{2})
- Elevation: 0 ft (0 m)

Population (2010)
  - Total: 5,116
  - Density: 4,410/sq mi (1,700/km^{2})
- Time zone: UTC-6 (CST)
  - Summer (DST): UTC-5 (CDT)
- Area code: 504

Map of the (voting) ward boundary

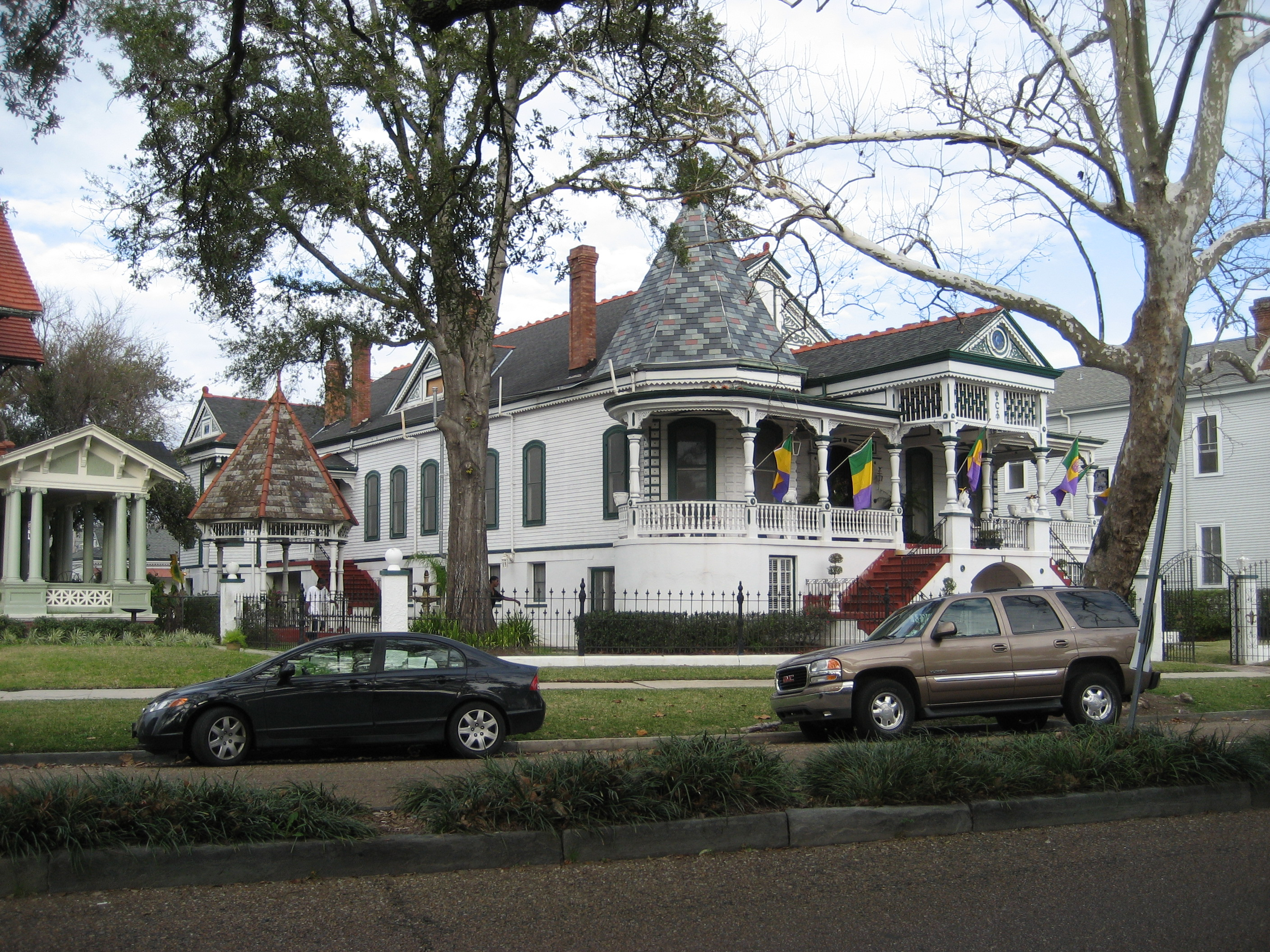
House on the 7th Ward side of Esplanade Avenue

The 7th Ward (Seventh Ward) is a legally defined voting ward and a neighborhood of the city of New Orleans. A sub-district of the Mid-City District Area, its boundaries as defined by the New Orleans City Planning Commission are: A.P. Tureaud Avenue, Agriculture, Allen, Industry, St. Anthony, Duels, Frenchmen and Hope Streets to the north, Elysian Fields Avenue to the east, St. Claude and St. Bernard Avenues, North Rampart Street and Esplanade Avenue to the south, and North Broad Street to the west.

The voting ward is geographically the third largest of the 17 wards of New Orleans, after the 9th Ward and 15th Ward.

== Boundaries and geography ==
According to the United States Census Bureau, the district has a total area of 1.16 square miles (3.0 km^{2}), all of which is land.

=== Boundaries ===
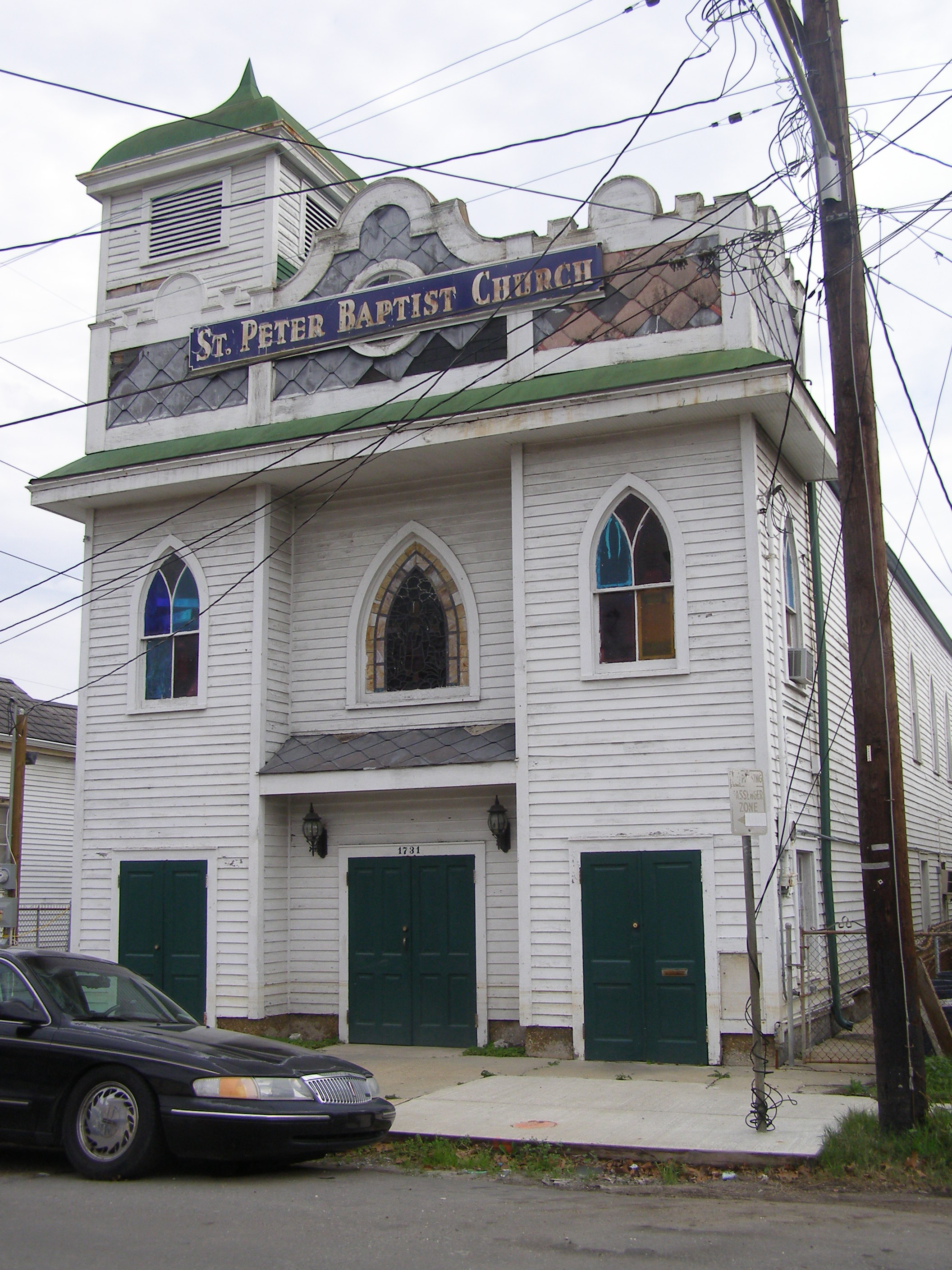
St. Peter Baptist Church

The New Orleans City Planning Commission defines the boundaries of Seventh Ward as these streets: A.P. Tureaud Avenue, Annette Street, Agriculture Street, Allen Street, Industry Street, St. Anthony Avenue, Duels Street, Frenchmen Street, Hope Street, Elysian Fields Avenue, St. Claude Avenue, St. Bernard Avenue, North Rampart Street, Esplanade Avenue and North Broad Street.

The 7th Ward stretches from the Mississippi River to Lake Pontchartrain. The eastern, or "lower" boundary is Elysian Fields Avenue, the boundary with the 8th Ward. In the "up-river" direction to the south-west, the boundary is Esplanade Avenue, the border with the 6th Ward; then from where Esplanade meets Bayou St. John the boundary follows the bayou north to the lake, with the 5th Ward being across the bayou.

=== Adjacent neighborhoods ===
- St. Roch (north & east)
- Marigny (south)
- Tremé (south)
- Fairgrounds (west)

== Features and landmarks ==
The London Avenue Canal runs through the ward from just in from Gentilly Ridge to the Lake. Dillard University is in the Ward, as is most of the University of New Orleans campus near the lakefront. The New Orleans Fairgrounds, home to horse racing and the New Orleans Jazz & Heritage Festival, is just back from Esplanade Avenue, as is Saint Louis Cemetery #3. Frenchmen Street, the popular destination for food and live music, is in the front of the ward near the French Quarter.

== Demographics ==
As of the census of 2000, there were 16,955 people, 6,489 households, and 3,965 families living in the neighborhood. By 2010, there were 10,187 people, 4,248 households, and 2,356 families living in the neighborhood. In 2000, the population density was 14,616 /mi² (5,652 /km^{2}). Historically, most of the inhabitants of New Orleans who are of Creole descent, were born in the Seventh Ward.

== Education ==
Orleans Parish School Board is the designated school district of New Orleans.

New Orleans Public Library will open the new Nora Navra Branch in the 7th Ward in 2017. Hurricane Katrina had damaged the previous facility in 2005. The Federal Emergency Management Agency (FEMA) was to pay for the costs of demolition of the previous library and construction of the new library since the previous facility had been, according to FEMA's estimation, over 50% damaged by Katrina. The features and amenities present in the new facility that were not in the previous facility were financed by other sources, including New Orleans municipal bond sales and funds from the Louisiana Recovery Authority. The "design-build" process, one specially allowed only in parishes affected by Hurricane Katrina under Louisiana law, was used to rebuild this library and four others. Two architectural firms, the New Orleans company Lee Ledbetter & Associates and the Kansas City, Missouri company Gould Evans Associates, were hired to design this library and four others. They were designed to have better access to public transportation and have reduced utility usage, including having electricity and water-saving features, in order to be more cost effective.

== History ==
As with most of New Orleans, the area along the high ground of the riverfront was developed first; this area is today the Marigny Triangle of the Faubourg Marigny. The Pontchartrain Railroad, the first US railroad away from the Atlantic coast, ran for a century along Elysian Fields between the Riverfront and the famous camps at Milneburg. The area is known for the Creole citizens who once heavily populated the area. Esplanade Ridge between Rampart and Bayou St. John was one of the first parts of town substantially developed away from the riverfront. Some of the elegant early 19th century Creole-style mansions can still be seen along Esplanade. The areas between Gentilly Ridge and the Lakefront was developed in the 20th century with improved drainage; see Drainage in New Orleans.

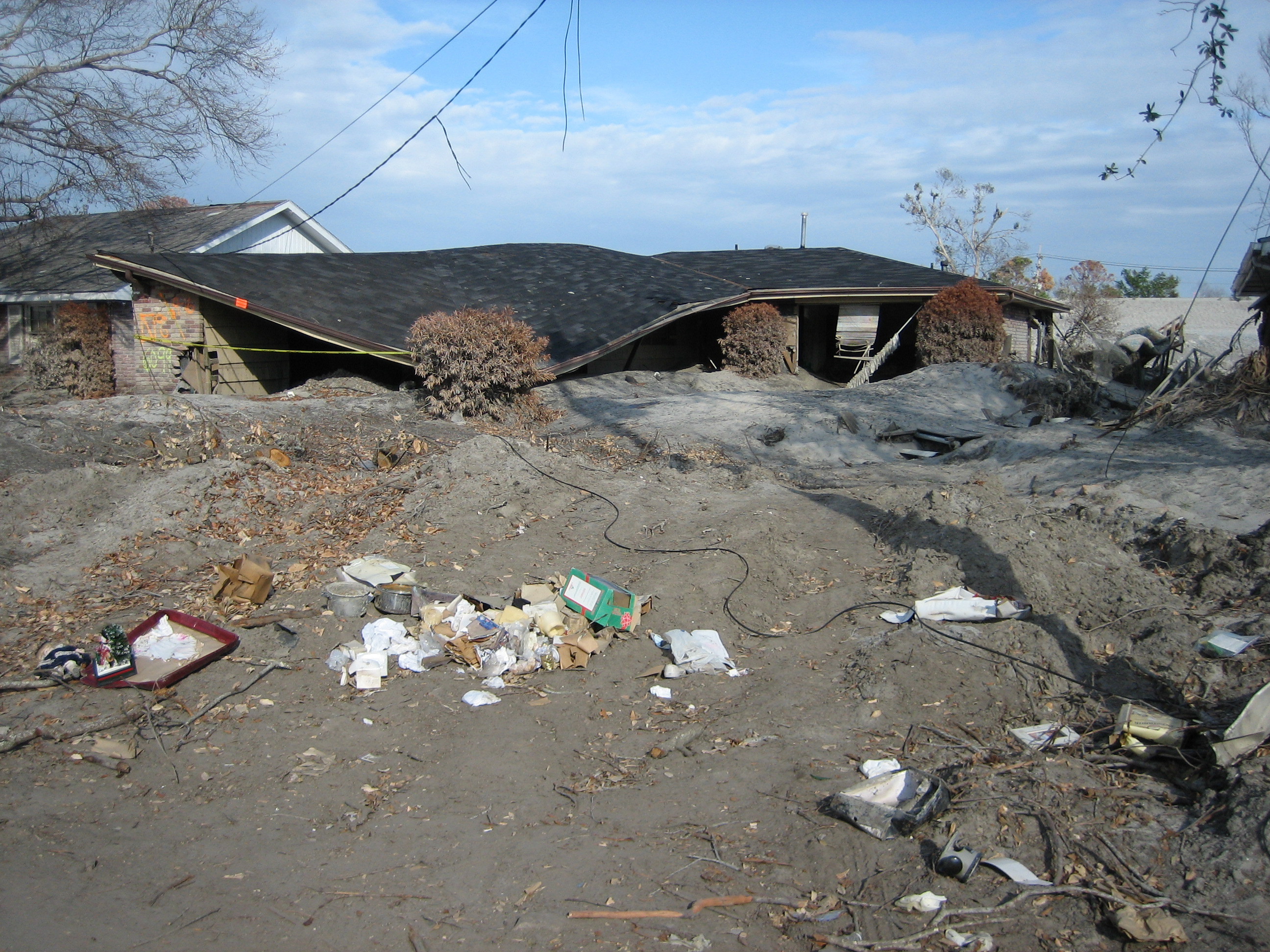
Ruined house in flood silt near the London Avenue Canal after the Hurricane Katrina levee failure disaster

When Hurricane Katrina struck New Orleans in 2005, the effects were disastrous. The London Avenue Canal breached catastrophically on both sides, flooding the majority of the ward and the surrounding area. The 7th ward has since seen many residents return.

== Notable people ==
Notable people from the 7th Ward include jazz musicians/composers Lionel Ferbos, Jelly Roll Morton, director, actor Vernel Bagneris, Barney Bigard, and Sidney Bechet, Allen Toussaint, singer Lee Dorsey, singer Lizzie Miles, Jazz singers Germaine Bazzle, Sharon Martin; actor Anthony Mackie, rapper/producer Mannie Fresh, rapper Mia X, author/commentator Melissa Harris-Perry, civil rights leader A. P. Tureaud, playwright Tyler Perry, authors Brenda Marie Osbey, Mona Lisa Saloy, Fatima Shaik, singer John Boutte, singer-songwriter Frank Ocean and fellow schoolmate R&B singer Luke James, singer August Alsina, football players Tyrann Mathieu Trai Turner and Leonard Fournette, boxer Joseph Dorsey Jr., mayors Ernest Morial, Sidney Barthelemy, and C. Ray Nagin, mathematician Beverly Anderson, rap artists Scott Arceneaux (Scrim) and Aristos Petrou (Ruby da Cherry) of Suicideboys.

== See also ==
- Neighborhoods in New Orleans
- Wards of New Orleans
- Dillard University
- Henry Braden and political organization COUP
