= Beverly Anderson =

American mathematician and academic (born 1943)

Beverly J. Anderson
- Born: September 10, 1943 (age 82); New Orleans
- Education: Dillard University; Howard University; Catholic University of America
- Scientific career
- Institutions: University of the District of Columbia; National Academy of Sciences
- Thesis: Facilitating the Learning of General Abstract Denotative Concepts in Mathematics (1978)

Beverly Jacques Anderson (born September 10, 1943) is an American mathematician and emeritus professor at the University of the District of Columbia. In the 1990s she worked at the National Academy of Sciences as Director of Minority Programs for the Mathematical Sciences Education Board, and led the Making Mathematics Work for Minorities program.

== Early life and education ==
Anderson grew up in the 7th Ward of New Orleans in a time of segregation. She was born to Alvin Joseph and Dorothy Ann, who never finished high school. Anderson attended Valena C. Jones School, an elementary school. She attended a high school for African-Americans, where she excelled in mathematics. She earned a bachelor's degree in mathematics at Dillard University. She was the first member of her family to leave New Orleans when she moved to Howard University for graduate school. She completed a PhD at the Catholic University of America in 1978.

== Research and career ==
Anderson began teaching mathematics at the University of the District of Columbia in 1969. She was awarded one of the faculty awards from the White House Initiative for Historically Black Colleges and Universities. She took a leave of absence to join the National Research Council of the National Academy of Sciences in 1988, where she launched the Making Mathematics Work for Minorities program. The program had three aims: to attract national attention to the need for minority students in mathematics, to identify best practice in mathematics education for minority students and develop a national strategy and alliance to improve mathematics education. She ran a series of workshops around the country, sharing ideas about how to help minorities excel in mathematics. Anderson argued that teaching mathematics without acknowledging the cultural bias that favoured students aligned with European tradition could significantly disadvantage people of colour.

Anderson identified that minority students enrolled in two-year college programs were 20% less likely to earn a bachelor's degree than those who started in four-year programs. She emphasized that school mathematics programs needed to be maintained long-term, for magnet schools to support the teaching profession and for comprehensive four-year college programs.

In her 40-year career at the University of the District of Columbia, Anderson was a Professor of Mathematics, Mathematics Department Chair, and Dean of the College of Arts and Sciences. She was made Provost and Vice President of Academic Affairs in 1997; however her appointment as provost was rescinded in 1999 after it was deemed to have been made without a proper search. She remained as a consultant on the National Academy of Sciences mathematics education program, serving as a consultant for the Everybody Counts report in 2000. In 2013 Anderson was appointed to the Prince George's County School Board.
