= Luke and Q =

African-American R&B duo

Luke & Q
- Origin: New Orleans, United States
- Genres: R&B
- Years active: 2004–2010
- Labels: J/Underdog
- Members: Luke Boyd; Quinten Spears

Luke and Q were an American R&B duo from New Orleans, consisting of Luke Boyd and Quinten Spears. They are best known for their 2006 single, "My Turn".

The duo met in eighth-grade when Boyd overheard Spears singing Ginuwine's "Same Ol' G". As Boyd recalls, "I was, like, You can sing, dog, but you may want to flip it," who then belted his version. They joined another childhood friend and formed a trio called Upskale, but the group disbanded almost as quickly as it began. The duo then began performing at local events, each landing roles as background vocalists for R&B singer Tyrese.

Through Tyrese, they met production duo Damon Thomas and Harvey Mason Jr. of The Underdogs for Underdog Entertainment, and were introduced to Clive Davis who subsequently signed them to the J Records imprint in 2004. "My Turn" served as their only major release; Boyd later branched off into a solo acting and recording career, while Spears has been yet to release any solo work.

== Discography ==
Singles

- 2006: "My Turn"
