= Joseph Dorsey Jr. =

American boxer

Personal information
- Nickname: Joe
- Born: Joseph Dorsey Jr. July 16, 1935 New Orleans, Louisiana, U.S.
- Died: October 20, 2004 (aged 69)
- Weight: Light heavyweight

Boxing career

Boxing record
- Total fights: 35
- Wins: 29
- Win by KO: 20
- Losses: 6

Joseph "Joe" Dorsey Jr. (July 16, 1935 – October 20, 2004) was an American professional boxer, ending with a 29-6 record, who won a court case in the 1950s against Louisiana's law banning interracial boxing matches. The New Orleans-born Dorsey began boxing at 16 and retired from the sport at age 31.

== Career ==
Boxing in New Orleans, a hotbed of enthusiasm for the sport, was segregated as early as 1892 when a black boxer named George Dixon beat his Irish challenger, Jack Skelly. By contrast, Louisiana state boxing officials didn't officially segregate the sport until 1950. In 1950, Governor Earl Long entrenched and widened the segregation policy, signing a law banning "dancing, social functions, entertainments, athletic training, games, sports or contests and other such activities involving personal and social contacts in which the participants or contestants are members of the White and Negro races."

Dorsey, a 7th Ward resident who was a light-skinned black man but would not pass for white, sued the state and its Louisiana State Athletic Commission for the right to box with white fighters on July 28, 1955. The New Orleans' major newspaper, The Times-Picayune, buried the story. In November 1958, a three-judge federal court in New Orleans found both the Louisiana law and the athletic commission's own rule against interracial bouts unconstitutional. Writing the opinion, Judge John Minor Wisdom of the United States Court of Appeals for the Fifth Circuit held that the Louisiana law was "unconstitutional on its face in that separation of Negroes and whites based solely on their being Negroes and whites is a violation of the Equal Protection Clause of the Fourteenth Amendment to the Constitution of the United States," and that segregated boxing matches were no exception. Louisiana appealed the ruling but the ruling was upheld by the Supreme Court in May 1959. The decision officially ended segregated athletic competition in the state, although it did not extend to the seating at sporting events, which remained segregated after the decision.

Dorsey retired from boxing not long after filing the lawsuit, partly because it was difficult for him to be allowed in boxing matches because he had been blacklisted, thanks to his part in boxing's desegregation. Dorsey worked nearly four decades as a longshoreman, retiring in 1997, after leaving boxing. Dorsey died October 20, 2004, from cancer. Dorsey's family survivors as of 2004 include his wife, Evelyn, and five sons and a daughter.
