= Bayou St. John (neighborhood) =

Bayou St. John Bayou Saint-Jean (French) Faubourg St. John
- Neighborhood
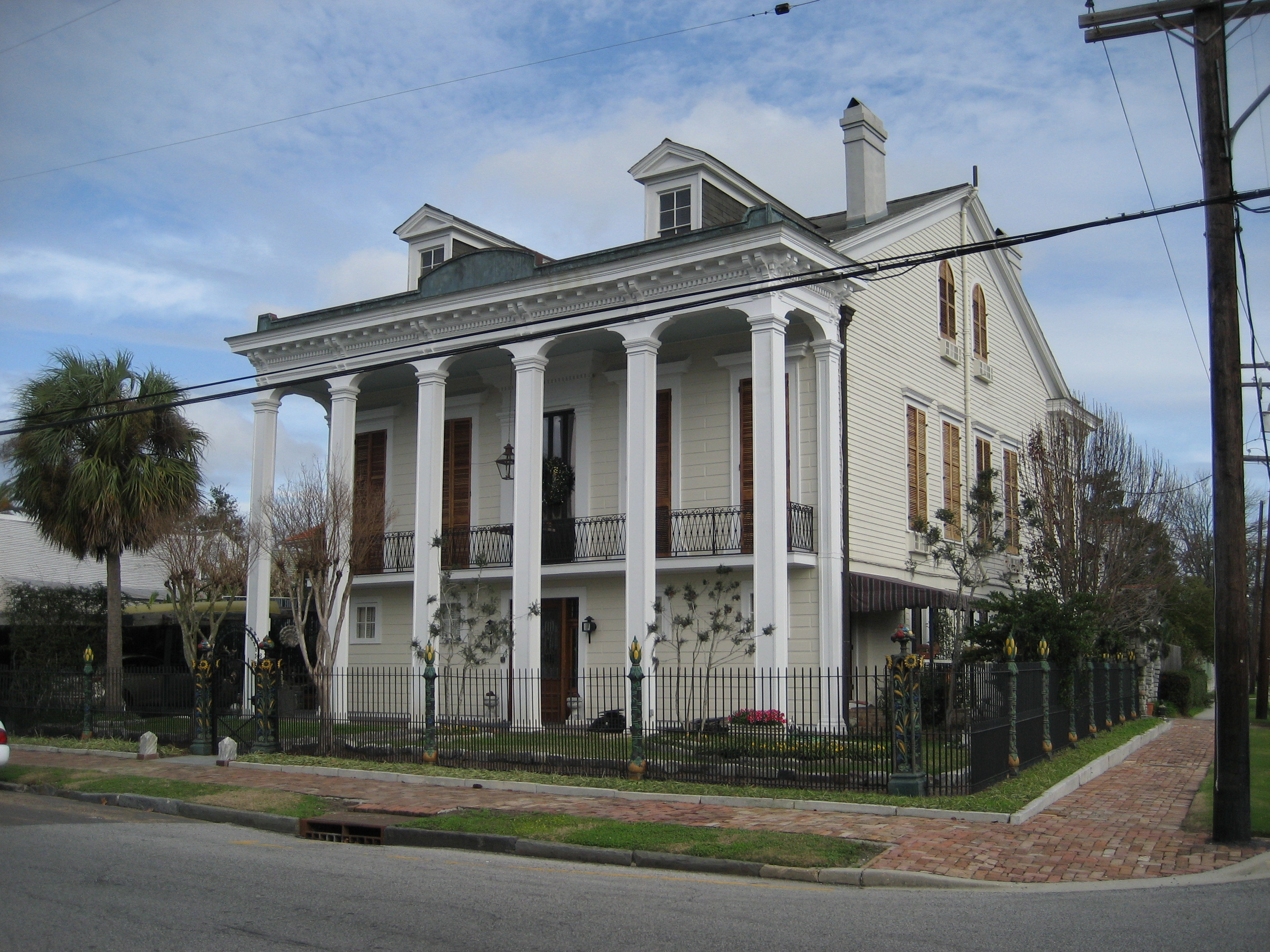
- The Dufour Plassan House with its "cornstalk fence" is a neighborhood landmark
- Interactive map of Bayou St. John
- Coordinates: 29°58′31″N 90°05′10″W
- Country: United States
- State: Louisiana
- City: New Orleans
- Planning District: District 4, Mid-City District

Area
  - Total: 0.42 sq mi (1.1 km^{2})
  - Land: 0.42 sq mi (1.1 km^{2})
  - Water: 0.00 sq mi (0 km^{2})
- Elevation: 0 ft (0 m)

Population (2010)
  - Total: 3,529
  - Density: 8,400/sq mi (3,200/km^{2})
- Time zone: UTC−6 (CST)
  - Summer (DST): UTC−5 (CDT)
- Area code: 504

Bayou St. John (French: Bayou Saint-Jean), also known as Faubourg St. John, is a neighborhood of the city of New Orleans. A subdistrict of the Mid-City area, its boundaries as defined by the New Orleans City Planning Commission are: Esplanade Avenue to the north, North Broad Street to the east, St. Louis Street to the south, and the Bayou St. John waterway, the neighborhood's namesake, to the west. The neighborhood was built along what is known as the Esplanade Ridge. The Esplanade Ridge Historic District was added to the National Register of Historic Places in 1980 and includes much of the neighborhood.

The neighborhood is known for its abundant parks, architecturally-significant homes, museums, and restaurants and shops along Ponce de Leon and Broad Streets.

== History ==
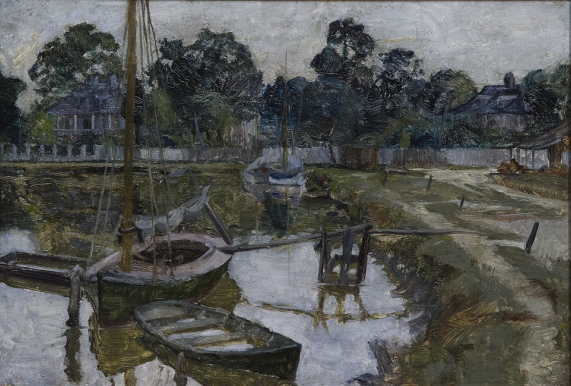
"Bayou Saint John at end of Grand Route Saint John" painted by William Woodward in 1887.

The area near the end of the navigable section of Bayou St. John was long a Native American trade route. Some French trappers and traders settled with the Native Americans by the end of the 17th century. In 1708, the community of Port Bayou Saint-Jean was established here. The town predated the official founding of New Orleans, but it was not incorporated into the city boundaries until the start of the 19th century.

A 1730 account notes Mardi Gras celebrations here. In 1794 the Carondelet Canal provided a navigable water link from the neighborhood to the city at the French Quarter.

A visitor at the start of the 19th century noted the neighborhood "has charming dance halls, cafes, and billiard parlors. The pleasures procured there by the young folks attract many people."

In 1852 the "Union Race Course" was laid out, later known as New Orleans Fair Grounds, it has long been a noted home to horse racing and other events. Since 1972 the Fair Grounds has been the venue for the New Orleans Jazz & Heritage Festival.

== Geography ==
According to the United States Census Bureau, the district has a total area of 0.42 square miles (1.1 km^{2}).

=== Adjacent neighborhoods ===
- Fairgrounds (north)
- Tremé (east)
- Mid-City (west)
- City Park (west)

=== Boundaries ===
The New Orleans City Planning Commission defines the boundaries of Bayou St. John as these streets: Esplanade Avenue, North Broad Street, St. Louis Street and Bayou St. John.

== Demographics ==
As of the census of 2000, there were 4,861 people, 2,113 households, and 1,082 families living in the neighborhood. The population density was 11,574 /mi^{2} (4,419 /km^{2}).

As of the census of 2010, there were 3,529 people, 1,719 households, and 747 families living in the neighborhood.

== Neighborhood association ==
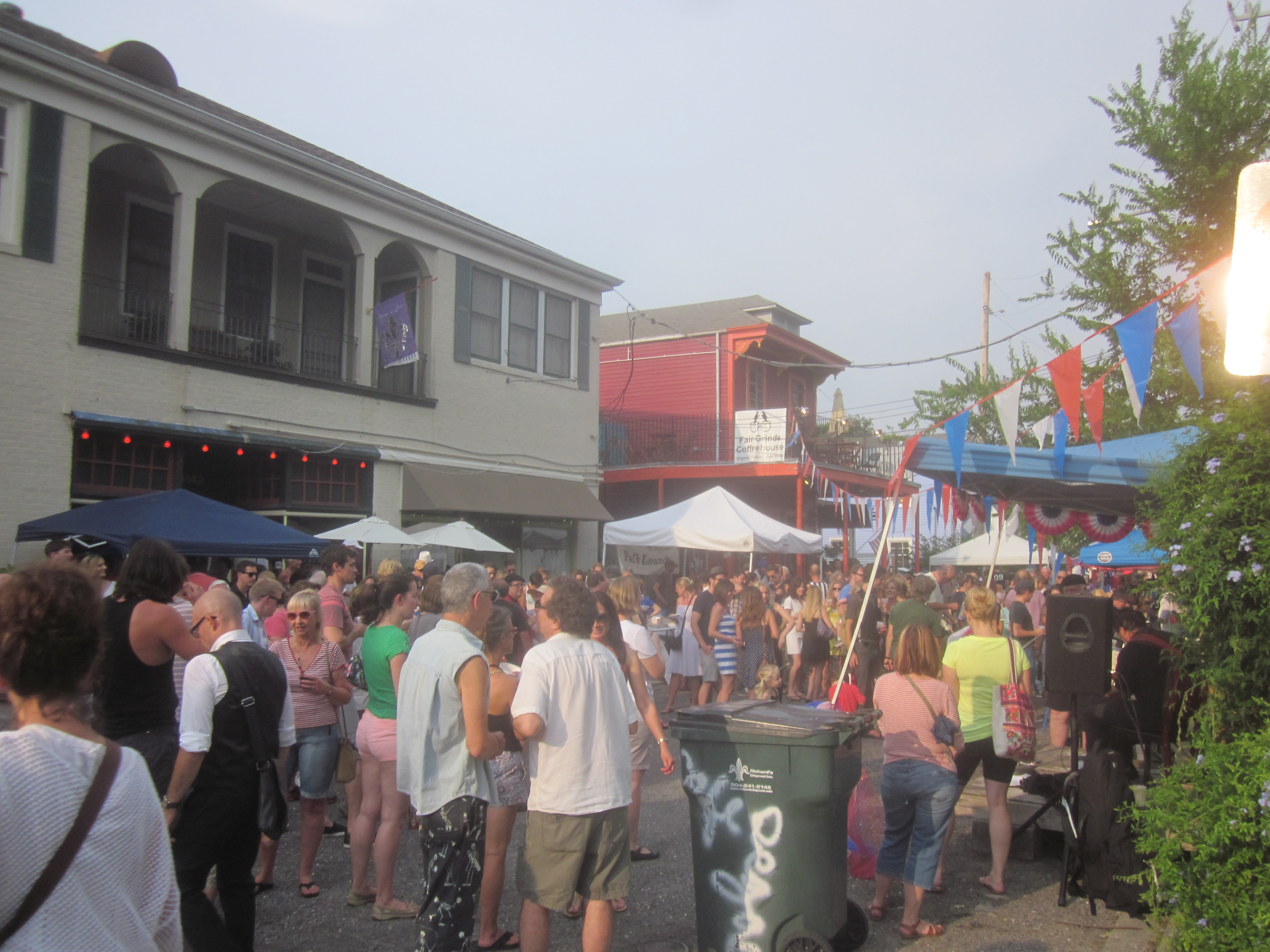
Bastille Day celebrations on Ponce de Leon Street, 2013.

The Faubourg St. John Neighborhood Association (FSJNA) has been around in one form or another since the 1920s. It was registered with the state in 1977. FSJNA is a benevolent group interested in continuing improvements in this historic New Orleans neighborhood through its people, children, historic waterway, public spaces and other environs. FSJNA has participated in numerous beautification efforts throughout Faubourg St. John from parks and playgrounds to simple street plantings. FSJNA works to keep its membership informed. It also reaches out to other non-profits and bordering neighborhood organizations, through its participation in area festivals, cultural events, community workshops, and informational seminars.

The current goal of the FSJNA is to revamp the worn Desmare Playground at 3456 Esplanade Avenue. Plans include making the playground a more welcoming place for children, with the addition of a swing set and complete replacement of the playground equipment.

== Schools and education ==
Cabrini High School is a girls' Catholic school located in Bayou St. John which offers grades 8-12 and was founded in 1905 by Mother Francesca Cabrini.

McDonough City Park Academy is a K-5 school.

== Landmarks ==
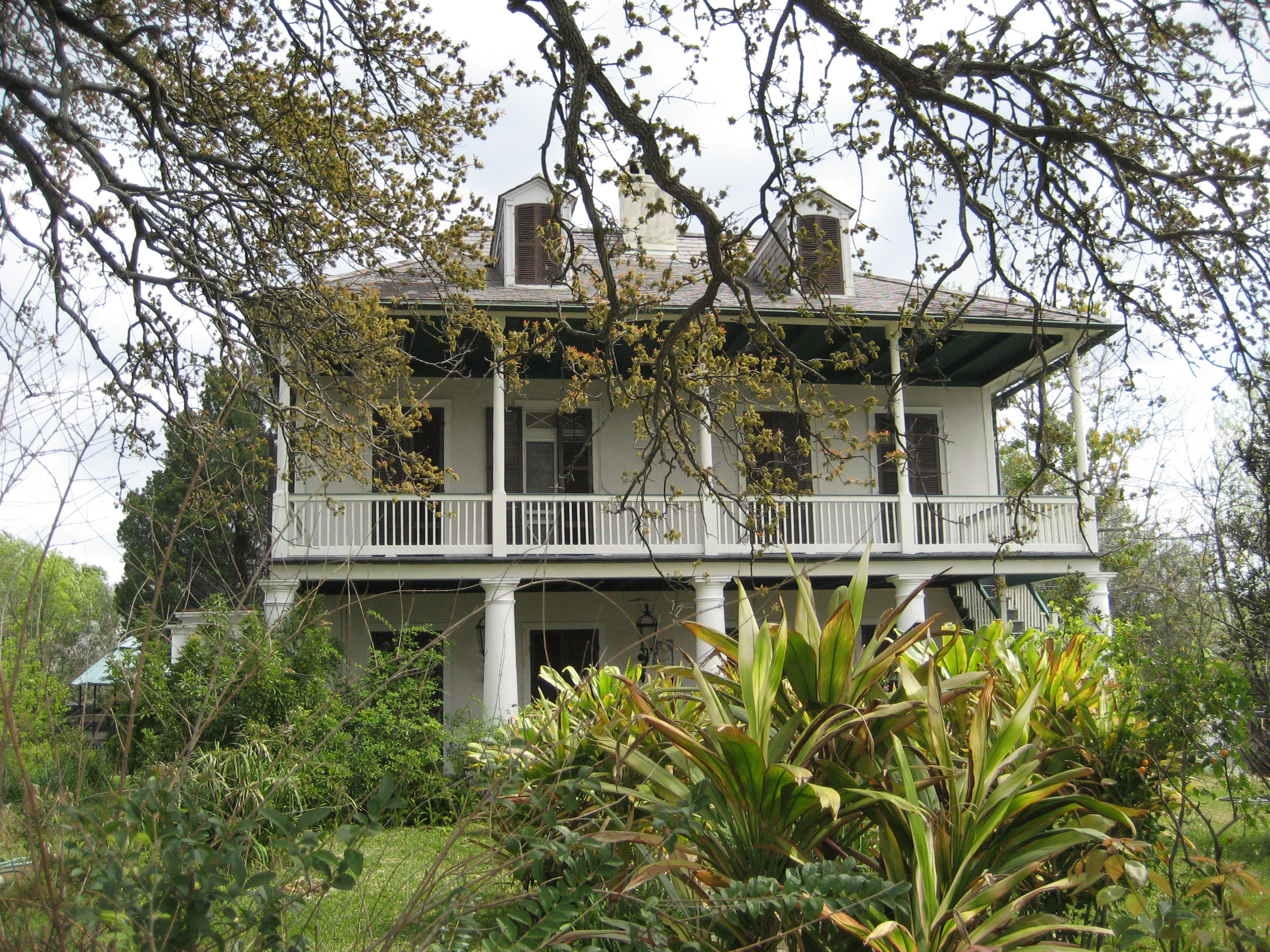
Old Spanish Customs House aka Lorreins Plantation House

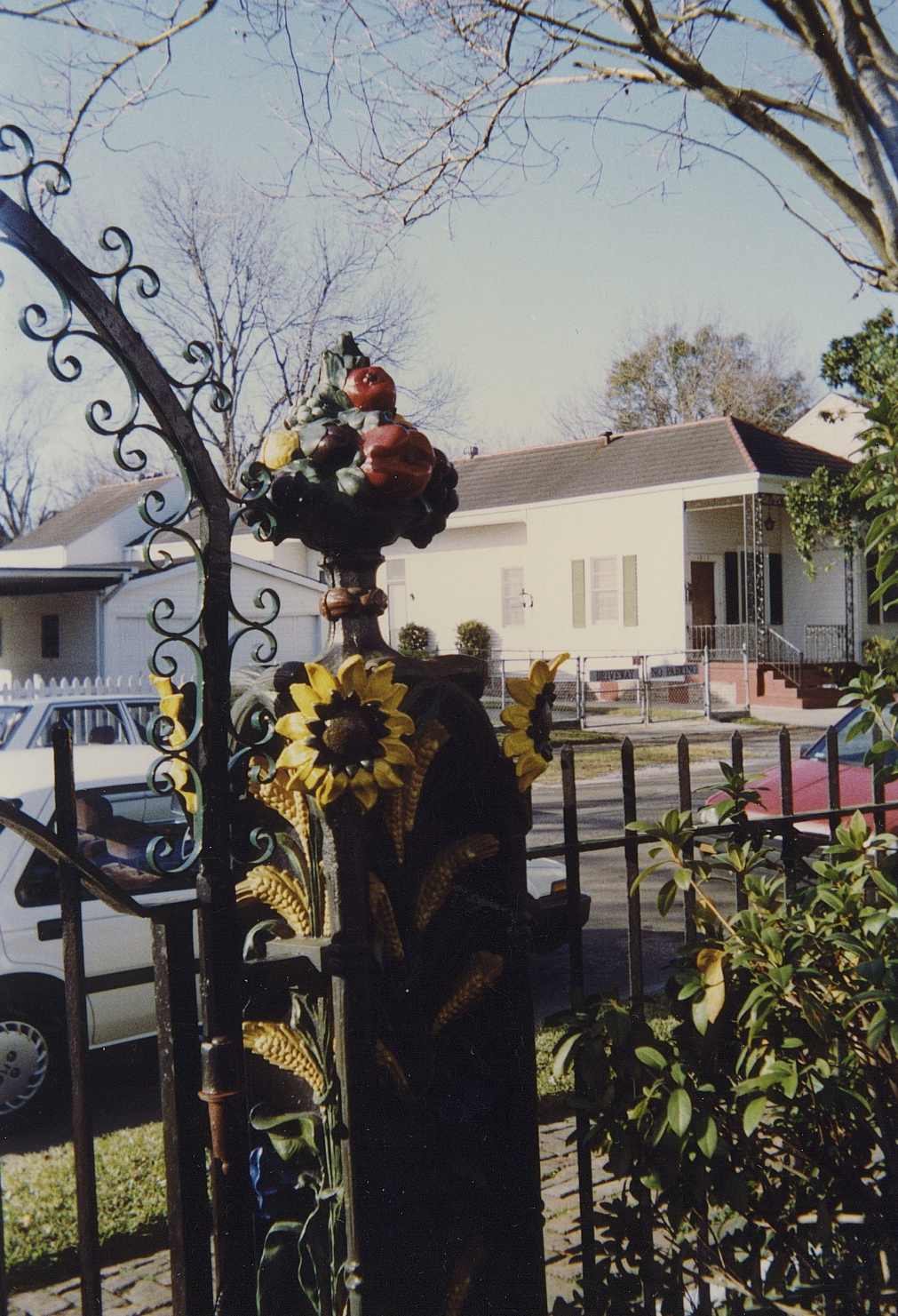
Detail of ironwork fence at the Dufour Plassan House

- New Orleans Fair Grounds
- Pitot House, the only Creole colonial house open to the public in New Orleans. It tells the story of life in the vicinity of Bayou St. John during the earliest times of settlement. The house is named for James Pitot, the second mayor of New Orleans, who resided there from 1810 to 1819. The house was restored to its former glory in the 1960s by the Louisiana Landmarks Association.
- Dufour Plassan House, built in 1870. The house is known for tall white columns and its elaborate cornstalk and sunflower decorated fence.
- Lorreins Plantation House, aka the Old Spanish Customs House, at Moss Street and Grand Route St. John.
- Saint Louis Cemetery #3, a historic cemetery established in 1854.

== See also ==
- Bayou St. John (waterway)
- Neighborhoods in New Orleans
