= Options (Luke James song) =

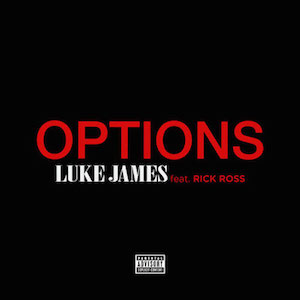

Single by Luke James featuring Rick Ross

from the album Luke James
- Released: June 3, 2014
- Recorded: 2012–2013
- Genre: R&B
- Length: 4:06
- Label: Island
- Songwriters: Dominic Gordon; Brandon Hesson; Jamaica "Kahn-Cept" Smith; William Roberts
- Producer: The Alliance

Luke James singles chronology
"Oh God" (2013)	"Options" (2014)	"Drip" (2017)

Rick Ross singles chronology
"They Don't Love You No More" (2014)	"Options" (2014)	"New Flame" (2014)

"Options" is a song recorded by American singer Luke James featuring American rapper Rick Ross. It was released on June 3, 2014, as the first single from James' self-titled debut studio album, Luke James (2014). The song was written by Dominic Gordon, Brandon Hesson, Jamaica "Kahn-Cept" Smith and Rick Ross, while the production was helmed by The Alliance. James' solo version of "Options" was nominated for a Grammy Award for Best R&B Song.

== Music video ==
The music video for "Options" featuring Rick Ross premiered on June 27, 2014, via James' Vevo channel. It was directed by Yolande Geralds.

== Charts ==
Chart (2014)	Peak position
US Adult R&B Songs (Billboard)	27

== Awards and nominations ==
Year	Awards	Category	Result	Ref.
2015	Grammy Awards	Best R&B Song	Nominated	
