= Luke James (singer) =

American singer-songwriter and actor

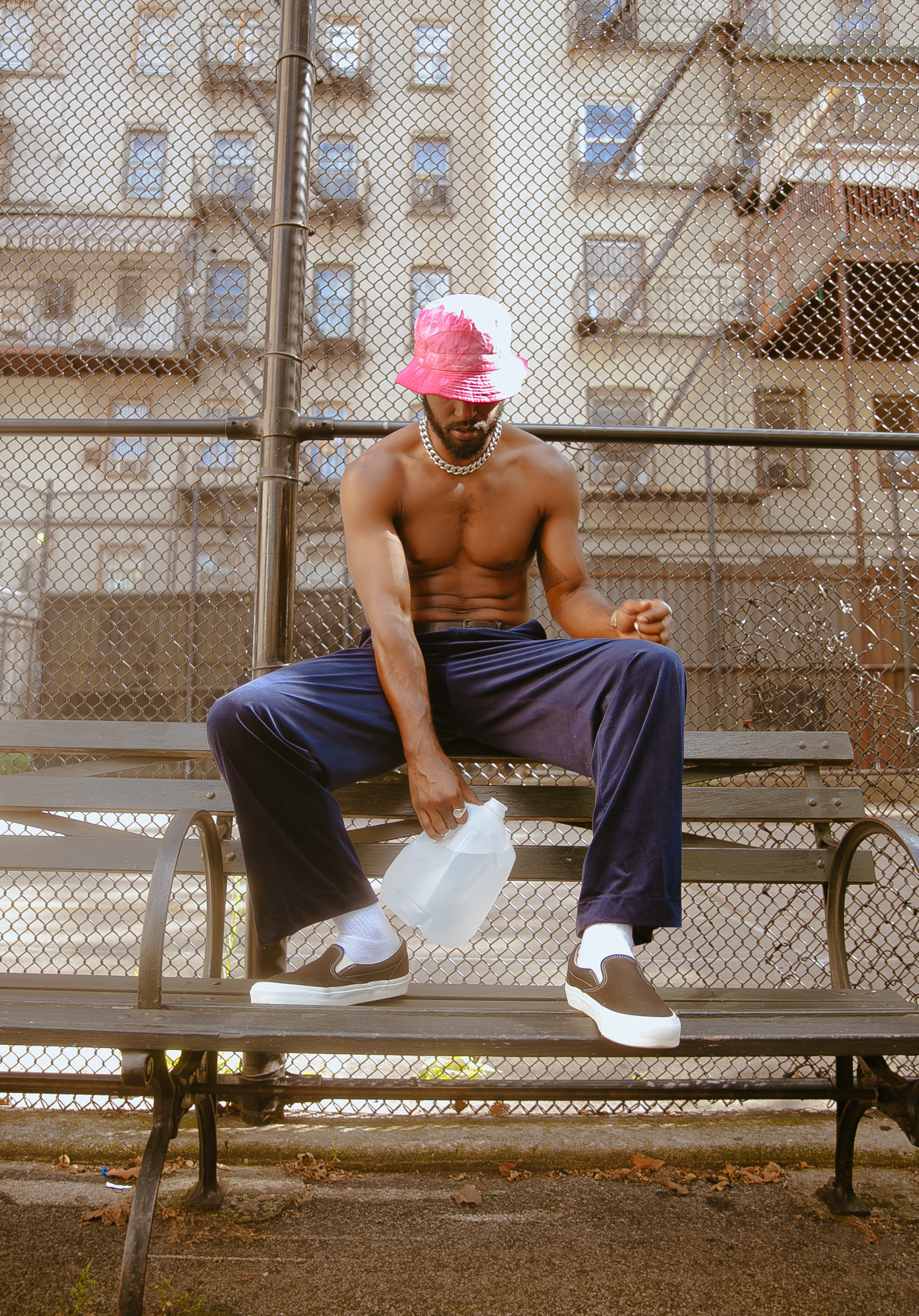
- Boyd in Brooklyn; 2019

Background information
- Also known as: WOLF
- Born: Luke James Boyd; June 13, 1984 (age 42); New Orleans, Louisiana, U.S.
- Genres: Alternative R&B; soul
- Occupations: Singer; songwriter; actor
- Instruments: Vocals; piano; keyboards; guitar; saxophone
- Years active: 2004–present
- Labels: Culture Collective; Island; Mercury; N.A.R.S.
- Formerly of: Luke and Q
- Website: officiallukejames.com

Luke James Boyd (born June 13, 1984) is an American singer, songwriter and actor from New Orleans, Louisiana. He began his career in 2004 as one half of the R&B duo Luke and Q, who served as backing vocalists for R&B singer Tyrese. While doing so, they became acquainted with the singer's primary songwriting-production team, the Underdogs; the duo was led to sign with J Records. Their 2006 debut single, "My Turn" failed to chart, although Boyd continued to write songs—often under the wing of the Underdogs—for other prominent artists including Chris Brown, Britney Spears, and Justin Bieber during the duo's inactivity and subsequent disbandment in 2010.

Further intent on a solo recording career, he signed with record producer Danja's label N.A.R.S., in a joint venture with Island Records to release his eponymous debut studio album (2014). Preceded by the mixtapes #Luke (2011) and Whispers in the Dark (2012), the album spawned the single "I Want You," which was nominated for Best R&B Performance at the 56th Annual Grammy Awards. His 2017 single, "Drip" (remixed featuring ASAP Ferg) preceded his self-released second studio album, to feel love/d (2020), which marked his return to music following a two-year hiatus and was nominated for Best R&B Album at the 63rd Annual Grammy Awards.

In his acting career, he starred as R&B singer Johnny Gill in BET's 2017 television biopic The New Edition Story. Since then, he has performed in Regina Hall and Will Packer film Little, in FOX's Star, HBO's Insecure, USA's Unsolved: The Murders of Tupac and the Notorious B.I.G., and BET's The Bobby Brown Story. He was also featured in the third season of The Chi on June 21, 2020. In 2024, Boyd starred as a lead male character in the Amazon Prime television series Them: The Scare, a sequel series to Them.

== Early life and career beginnings ==
Born in New Orleans, Louisiana, and raised by a single mother, James was influenced by an eclectic array of genres, particularly jazz and R&B. James said his love for music started when he watched a contestant perform a cover version of Donny Hathaway's version of "A Song for You" on Showtime at the Apollo.

As a child, James was inspired by several recording artists and musicians such as Marvin Gaye, Willie Nelson, Harold Melvin and the Blue Notes, Alabama, among others. He credits his mother for introducing him to all kinds of music. James attended St. Augustine High School in New Orleans with schoolmate, (and future OFWGKTA member) singer-songwriter Frank Ocean. While at St. Augustine, he joined a musical trio named Upskale with Quinten Spears (known as Q) and Tah for a brief period, which introduced him to his longtime manager, director, and choreographer Frank Gatson. After graduating St. Augustine, the trio split and James relocated to Los Angeles. Q and James later formed a duo called Luke & Q, where James performed under the name Luke The Singer.

== 2007–present: songwriting and breakthrough ==
After disbanding, James honed his skills as a songwriter, quickly hooked up with producer Danja, and began to craft hits for those in the pop, R&B and soul genres. He also worked alongside Tank. He then began to co-write hits, such as Chris Brown's "Crawl" for his third album, Graffiti. In addition to writing for Brown, he also wrote (or co-wrote) hits for pop artists such as Justin Bieber ("That Should Be Me"), Britney Spears ("Kill the Lights") and Keri Hilson ("Do It").

In 2005, he appeared in Destiny's Child's "Soldier" video, with the members of the Upskale music trio. In 2011, he was selected by R&B singer Beyoncé to appear as a model/actor in her "Run the World (Girls)" video. In December 2011, he released his debut extended play (EP) album #Luke as a free digital download. His first single, "I Want You", received universal acclaim from critics for its production and for James' vocal performance. The single later earned him a nomination for Best New Artist at the 2012 Soul Train Music Awards. Upon release of his second free digital mixtape, Whispers in the Dark, in December 2012, James began to garner buzz for his formal self-titled debut album, which is expected to be released from Def Jam in early 2014. On January 8, 2013, the album's first single, "Make Love to Me", was released to iTunes one month after the music video directed by Frank Gatson. At the 56th Annual Grammy Awards, James was nominated for Best R&B Performance award for his 2012 single "I Want You" (but he lost to Usher's "Climax"). On February 7, 2013, the song "I.O.U." was released as the second single from his anticipated debut album. In 2013, he was personally chosen by Beyoncé to be an opening act for her Mrs. Carter Show World Tour. In August 2013 he released a video for "Oh God" featuring Hit-Boy; the music video was directed by Sarah McColgan. On December 4, 2013, he released another visual for "Strawberry Vapors", also directed by Sarah McColgan, the song was another release off the Whispers in the Dark album. On December 5, 2014, James received his second career Grammy Award nomination for Best R&B Song for "Options (Wolfjames Version)".

In 2016, James auditioned for the role of Singer Johnny Gill in the BET Biopic Miniseries The New Edition Story, after being considered by long time music associate Elijah Kelley. Both were cast in the biopic (with Kelley in the role of Ricky Bell). From 2017 to 2019, James played Noah Brooks in the main cast of Lee Daniels' Musical Drama, Star on FOX. Later in 2019, he was cast in Will Packer's Little alongside Regina Hall and Issa Rae. .

== Discography ==
Studio albums

- Luke James (2014)
- to feel love/d (2020)
- For No Reason (2020)

Mixtapes

- #Luke (2011)
- Whispers in the Dark (2012)

Singles

List of singles by title, year, peak chart positions, and album
Title	Year	Peak chart positions			Album
Title	Year	US	US R&B	US Adult R&B Airplay	Album
"Make Love to Me"	2012	—	—	m	Luke James
"I Want You"	2012	—	97	40	Luke James / #Luke
"Oh God" (featuring Hit-Boy)	2013	—	—	—	Whispers in the Dark
"Options" (featuring Rick Ross)	2014	—	28	27	Luke James
"Drip"	2017	—	—	—	For No Reason
"World To Me" (produced by Tchami)	2017	—	—	—	Non-album single
"These Arms"	2018	—	—	—	For No Reason
"Amor, My Love" (ft. G.No)	2019	—	—	—	Non-album single
"Breathless" (with Jude Demorest)	2019	—	—	—	Star
"go girl" (featuring BJ The Chicago Kid and Ro James)	2019	—	29	—	to feel love/d
"all of your love'	2019	—	—	—	to feel love/d
"blow'	2019	—	—	—	to feel love/d

== Filmography ==
=== Film ===
Year	Title	Role	Notes
2011	Rift	Freddy Davis	
2013	Black Nativity	Jo-Jo	
2019	Little	Trevor	
2021	Horror Noire	Red	

=== Television ===
Year	Title	Role	Notes
2003	Half & Half	Tyrese's background singer	Episode: "The Big Sexy Shame Episode"
2017	The New Edition Story	Johnny Gill	Main cast
2017	Insecure	Ben	Episode: "Hella Open"
2017–2019	Star	Noah Brooks	Main cast (seasons 2–3)
2018	Unsolved	Sean Combs	5 episodes
2020–2026	The Chi	Victor "Trig" Taylor	Main cast (seasons 4–8); recurring (season 3)
2021	Genius: Aretha	Glynn Turman	2 episodes
2021	Christmas in Harmony	Kyle Noah	Television film
2024	Them: The Scare	Edmund Gaines	Main cast (season 2)

=== Theater ===
Year	Title	Role	Notes
2021	Thoughts of a Colored Man	Passion	Broadway debut
2026	Wanted: The Legend of the Sisters Clarke	Elijah	Broadway

=== Music videos ===
Year	Title	Artist(s)	Notes
2005	"Soldier"	Destiny's Child	as a member of 'Upskale'
2011	"Run The World (Girls)"	Beyoncé	
2013	"Superpower"	Beyoncé feat. Frank Ocean	
2024	"Made for Me"	Muni Long	

== Tours ==
- BET Music Matters Tour (with Estelle), (2012)
- The Mrs. Carter Show World Tour (opening act), (2013–14)
- Sweet Talker Tour (opening act for Jessie J), (2014–15)
- to feel love/d tour, (2020)

== Awards and nominations ==
Year	Awards	Category	Work	Result	Ref.
2012	Soul Train Music Awards	Best New Artist	—N/a	Nominated	
2013	Grammy Awards	Best R&B Performance	"I Want You"	Nominated	
2013	Soul Train Music Awards	Centric Award	—N/a	Won	
2015	Grammy Awards	Best R&B Song	"Options"	Nominated	
2020	Grammy Awards	Best R&B Album	To Feel Love/d	Nominated	
