= Germaine Bazzle =

American jazz vocalist (b. 1932)

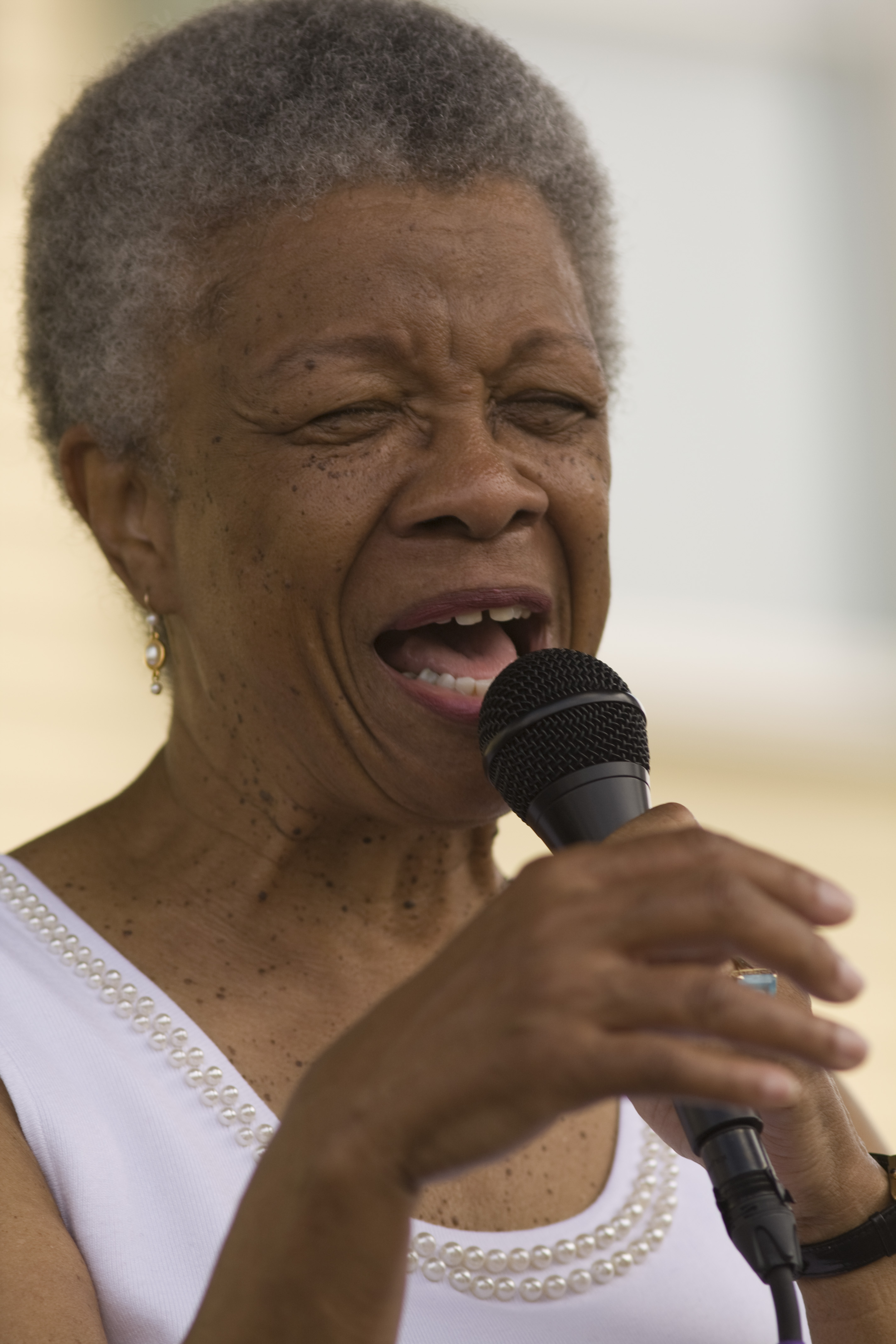
- Bazzle performing in 2009

Background information
- Born: March 28, 1932 (age 94); New Orleans, Louisiana, U.S.
- Genres: Jazz
- Instrument: Vocals

Germaine Bazzle (born March 28, 1932) is a jazz vocalist from New Orleans.

== Background ==
Bazzle was born in New Orleans in 1932 and is from the Seventh Ward. She grew up in a musical family and began playing the piano by ear at a young age. Her formal musical education began at the age of twelve at the Xavier Junior School of Music. Her musical influences include Sarah Vaughan, Ella Fitzgerald, and Billy Eckstein.

== Career ==
After graduating from the Xavier University of Louisiana Bazzle worked as a teacher, including as choir and music appreciation at Xavier Prep. She retired from teaching in 2008.

Since graduating from university Bazzle has been a performing musician. She has collaborated and performed with Red Tyler, Peter "Chuck" Badie, Victor Goines, George French, Ellis Marsalis, Emile Vinnette, Larry Siebert, and David Torkanowsky, along with their band Germaine Bazzle & Friends. She sang regularly with the Saint Louis Catholic Choir and The New World Ensemble. She has performed in New Orleans night clubs for over twenty years.

Bazzle is a supporter and faculty member of the Louis Armstrong Jazz Camp.

== Discography ==
Between 1985 and 1997 she participated in ten recording sessions as a vocalist and backing vocalist.

=== Albums ===
Year	Title	Record label	Notes
1996	Standing Ovation	AFO Records	
2018	Swingin’ At Snug	Independent	

=== Guest appearances and collaborations ===
Year	Title	Artist	Record label	Notes
1962	Ya! Ya!	Lee Dorsey	Hoo Doo Records	Composer, "Lonely Evening"
1963	The Boss of the Blues	Charles Brown	Mainstream/Legacy	Composer
1985	Lost in the Stars: the Music of Kurt Weill	Various artists	A&M	Vocals (background)
1985	Heritage	Alvin "Red" Tyler with Johnny Adams and Germaine Bazzle	Rounder Records	
1988	The New New Orleans Music: Vocal Jazz	Various artists	Rounder Records	Alvin "Red" Tyler, Germaine Bazzle & Friends, Lady BJ & the Ellis Marsalis Quartet
1994	Still Spicy Gumbo Stew	Various artists	AFO Records	Composer
1994	Joe Cool's Blues	Ellis Marsalis and Wynton Marsalis	Columbia	Vocals
1996	The Grand Encounter	Dianne Reeves	Blue Note	Vocals
1996	Mood Indigo	The New Orleans C.A.C. Jazz Orchestra	Rounder Records	with Johnny Adams, Germaine Bazzle, and George French
1998	The B-3 and Me	Davell Crawford	Bullseye Blues	Guest artist, vocals
1988	Modern New Orleans Masters	Various artists	Rounder Records	Primary artist, vocals, "A Foggy Day"
1999	Since I Fell For You	Charles Brown	Garland	Composer
2002	Reflections	Louis Ford	Louis Ford	Featured artist
2016	New Orleans Ladies Of Jazz & Music Alive Ensemble – I Saw Three Ships	Various artists	Independent	(2016), Independent, with Stephanie Jordan, Leah Chase

== Awards ==
In 2015, Bazzle received OffBeat's Lifetime Achievement in Music Education award. OffBeat also awarded her two Best of the Beat awards, Best Contemporary Jazz Vocalist in 1996 and Best Female Vocalist in 1997. In 1990, 1992, 1993, and 1994 she received the Big Easy Music Award for Best Female Performer.
