= Rift valley (disambiguation) =

A rift valley is a linear lowland formed by the action of a geologic rift.

Rift Valley may also refer to:

== Education ==
- Rift Valley Academy, Christian boarding school in Kijabe, Kenya
- Rift Valley University College, private university in Ethiopia
- Rift Valley Institute, non-profit research and training organization in East Africa

== Organizations ==
- Rift Valley Railways, manages the state-run railways of Kenya and Uganda
- Rift Valley Resources, mineral exploration company focusing on Tanzania
- Rift Valley United F.C., association football club based in Eldoret, Kenya

== Other ==
- Rift Valley Province, former province of Kenya
- Rift Valley lakes, group of lakes in the East African Rift
- Rift Valley fever, mild to severe viral disease

== See also ==
- Great Rift Valley (disambiguation)
- Jordan Rift Valley
- Waimangu Volcanic Rift Valley
