= Faubourg Marigny =

Marigny
- New Orleans neighborhood
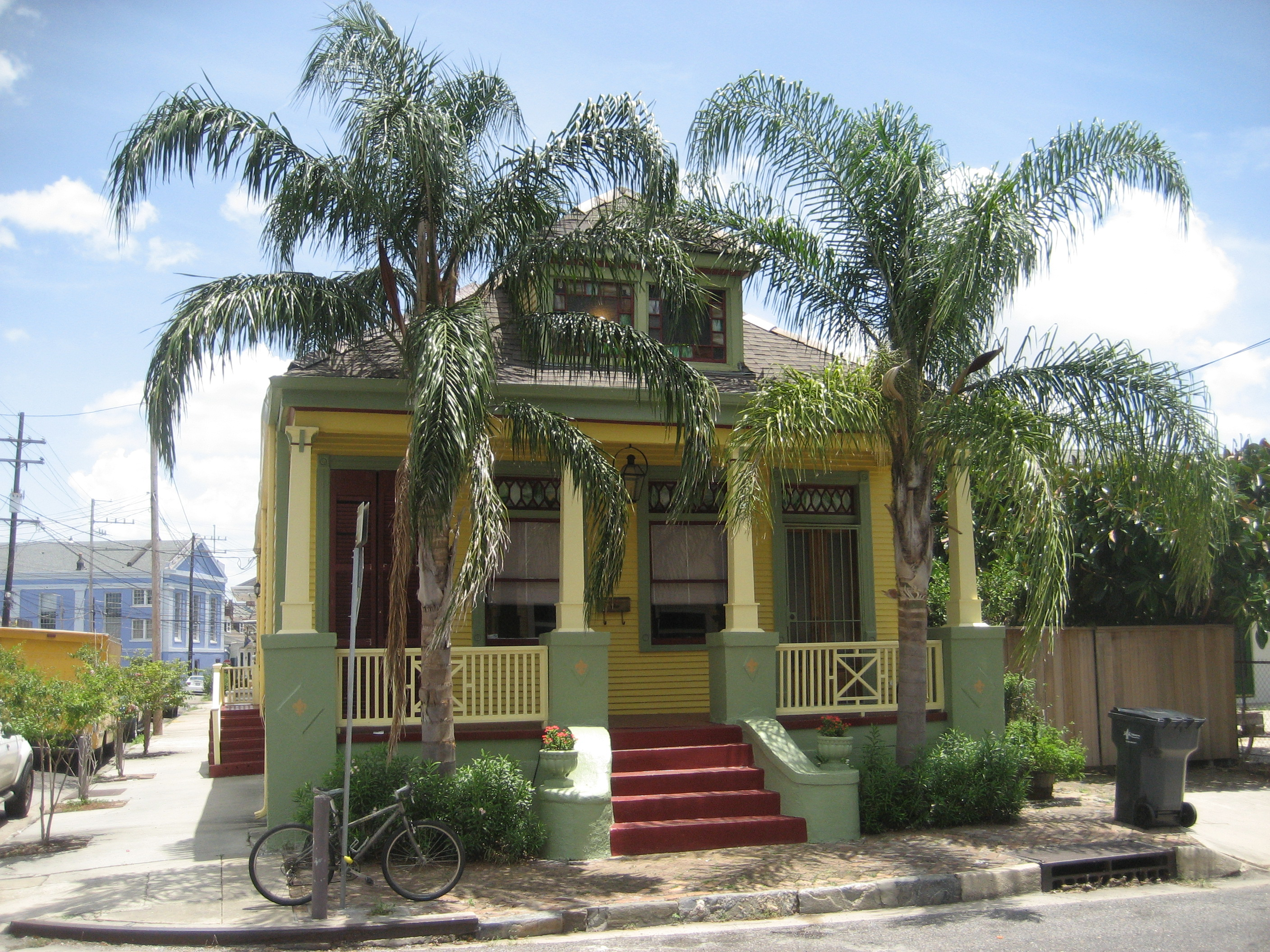
- Residential architecture in Faubourg Marigny
- Interactive map of Marigny
- Coordinates: 29°57′53″N 90°03′19″W
- Country: United States
- State: Louisiana
- City: New Orleans
- Planning District: District 7, Bywater District
- Named for: Bernard de Marigny

Area
  - Total: 0.3378 sq mi (0.875 km^{2})
  - Land: 0.31 sq mi (0.80 km^{2})
  - Water: 0.02 sq mi (0.052 km^{2})
- Elevation: 1 ft (0.30 m)

Population (2010)
  - Total: 2,128
  - Density: 6,900/sq mi (2,700/km^{2})
- Time zone: UTC-6 (CST)
  - Summer (DST): UTC-5 (CDT)
- Area code: 504

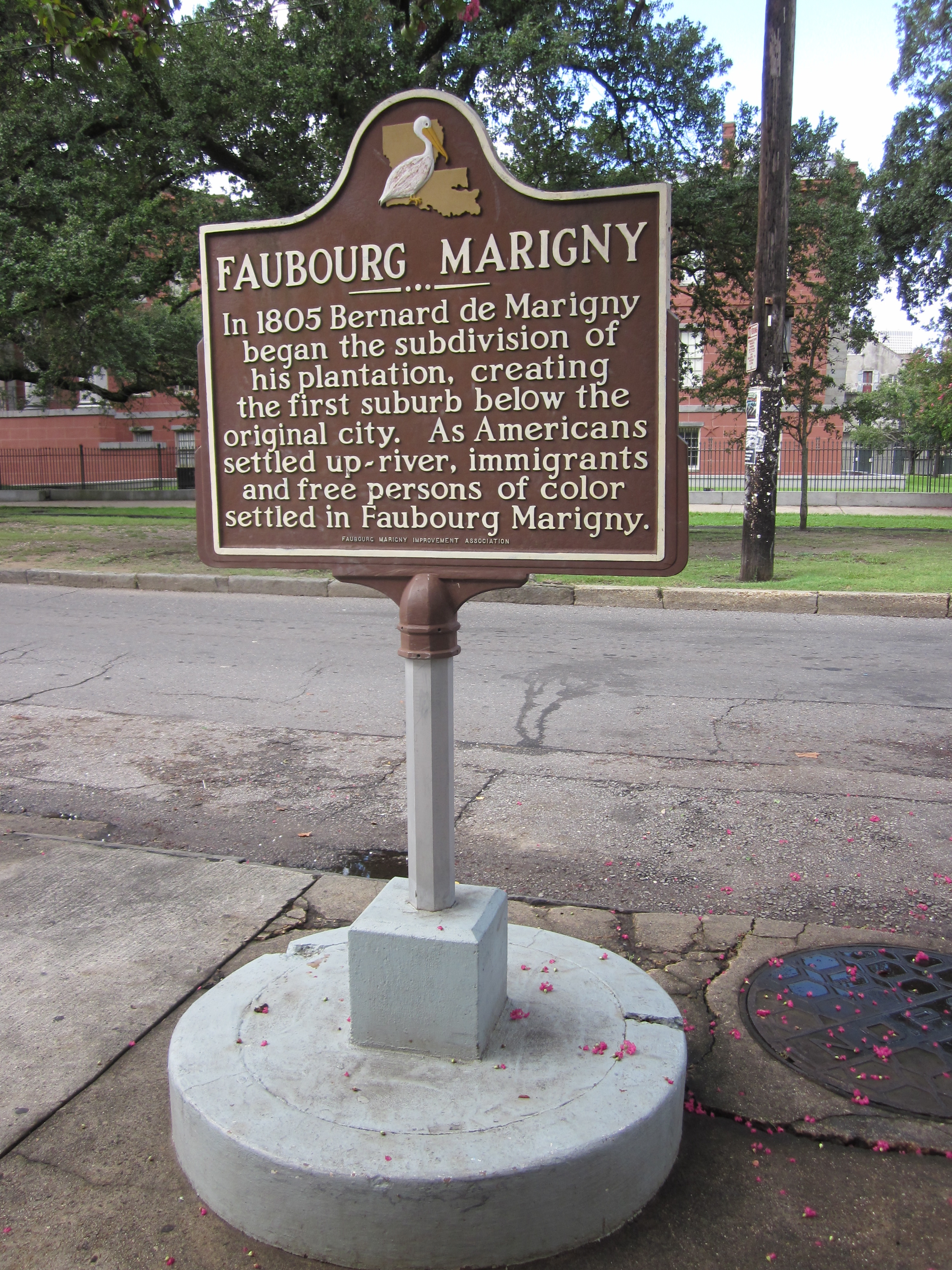
Marker commemorating the 1805 founding of the faubourg

The Faubourg Marigny (/ˈfoʊbɜːrɡ ˈmærɪni/ FOH-burg MAYR-in-ee; sometimes called The Marigny) is a neighborhood of the city of New Orleans, Louisiana, United States.

Its boundaries, as defined by the City Planning Commission, are North Rampart Street and St. Claude Avenue to the north, the railroad tracks along Homer Plessy Way (formerly Press Street) to the east, the Mississippi River to the south, and Esplanade Avenue to the west.

== Geography ==
The Faubourg Marigny is located at 29°57′53″N 90°03′19″W and has an elevation of 1 foot (0.3 m). According to the United States Census Bureau, the district has a total area of 0.33 square miles (0.9 km^{2}). 0.31 square miles (0.8 km^{2}) of which is land and 0.02 square miles (0.1 km^{2}) (6.06%) of which is water.

In the 19th century, the Faubourg Marigny was the old Third Municipality of New Orleans. The triangular area between Esplanade and Elysian Fields Avenue is sometimes called the Marigny Triangle and is part of the 7th Ward of New Orleans. The remainder is in the 8th and 9th wards of New Orleans.

=== Adjacent neighborhoods ===
- Seventh Ward (north)
- St. Roch (north)
- Bywater (east)
- French Quarter (west)

=== Boundaries ===
The City Planning Commission defines the boundaries of the Faubourg Marigny as: North Rampart Street, St. Claude Avenue, the railroad tracks along Homer Plessy Way (formerly Press Street), the Mississippi River, and Esplanade Avenue.

=== South 7th Ward ===
In 2013, the neighborhood corresponding to U.S. census tract 27, bound by N. Claiborne Avenue, Elysian Fields Avenue, St. Claude Avenue, and St. Bernard Avenue, was given the name South 7th Ward, by a consensus vote of residents of the area, following several public meetings of the neighborhood's neighbor organization.

=== New Marigny ===
The area farther back from the new Rampart/St. Claude street car to I-10 is considered New Marigny, the name dating to the early 19th century. The lower boundary, with the Bywater neighborhood, is either Press Street (a traditional boundary along the railroad tracks) or Franklin Avenue (the upper boundary of the city's 9th Ward).

The New Marigny Historic District was added to the National Register of Historic Places in 1994. The area contains parts of the 7th and 8th wards as well as the Faubourg Saint Roch and the upriver part of the Faubourg Saint Claude.

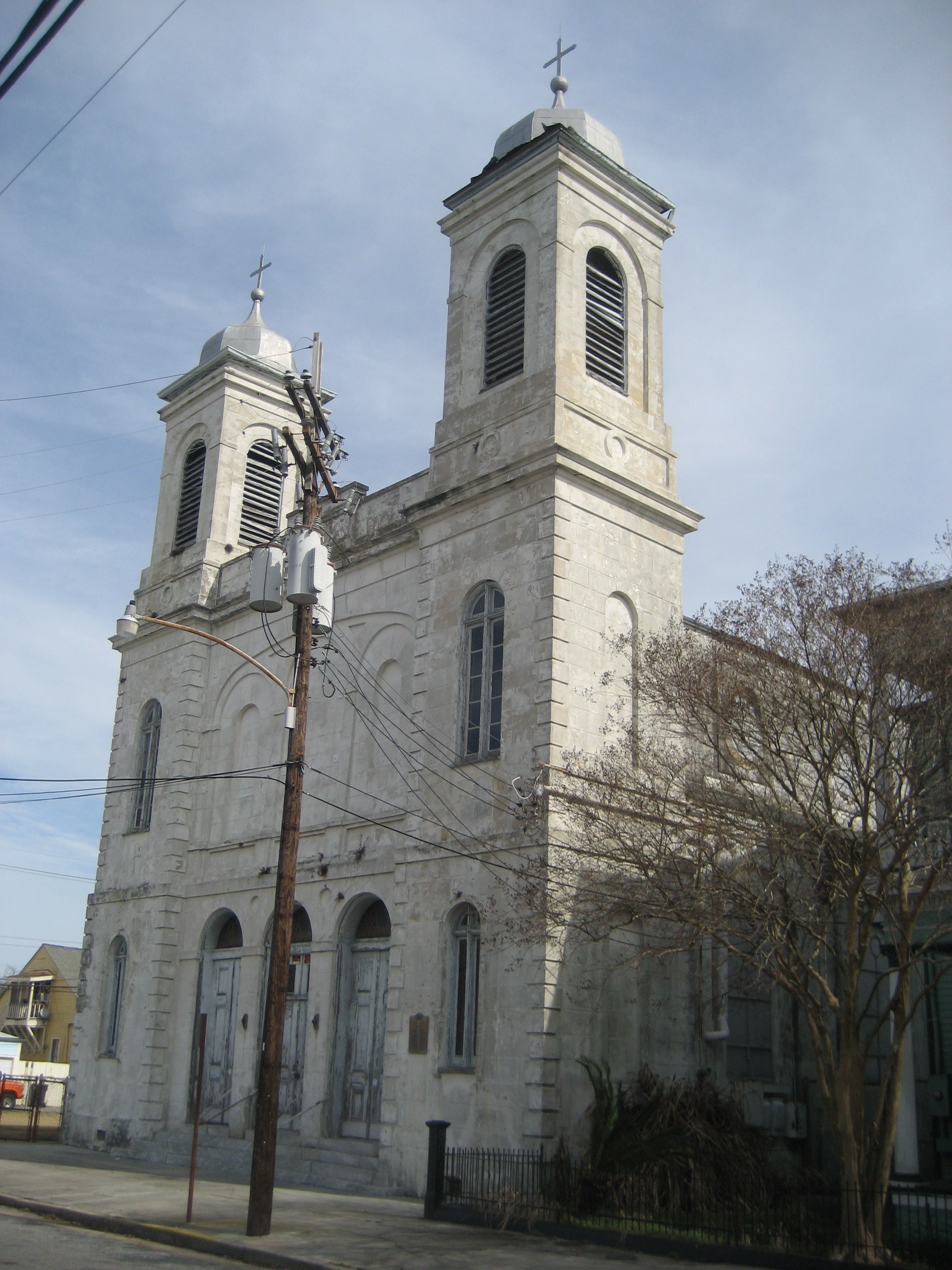
The Marigny Opera House, a performing arts center adapted from a former Catholic church, in Faubourg Marigny.

Formerly part of a plantation, this area was developed by Creole landowner Bernard de Marigny, beginning in the early 19th century. He divided his plantation and sold the lots in an 1806 subdivision, the Faubourg Marigny. They sold so quickly that he extended the development four years later. Sales of the affordable, modest-sized lots were spurred in 1831 when the Pontchartrain Railroad, or "Smoky Mary", began running on Elysian Fields Avenue.

Development of the area downriver of Elysian Fields Avenue followed when the Faubourg Franklin was laid out in 1834. This neighborhood, like the portion of the Faubourg Marigny located across St. Claude Avenue, was settled primarily by Louisiana Creoles of color and German immigrants between the 1830s and 1880s.

Several musicians either grew up in the neighborhood or moved here as adults. Ferdinand LaMothe, better known as Jelly Roll Morton, would sneak away from his upright Creole grandmother's home, just off Elysian Fields Avenue, to play piano in the red light district of Storyville. Sidney Bechet, Manny Perez, Danny Barker, and Paul Barbarin, all giants of New Orleans music, made their homes in the neighborhood.

In the 21st century, this area is the site of both funk palaces such as the Saturn Bar on St. Claude Avenue and 19th-century icons such as the St. Roch Market. This is one of the last surviving public market buildings in New Orleans. The independent Circle Market at 1522 St. Bernard Avenue continues to thrive despite competition from national grocery chains.

Longstanding oaks line St. Roch and Elysian Fields avenues, where Creole cottages and shotgun houses are being renovated and painted. A public park is being developed for the formerly industrial Press Street corridor.

== Demographics ==
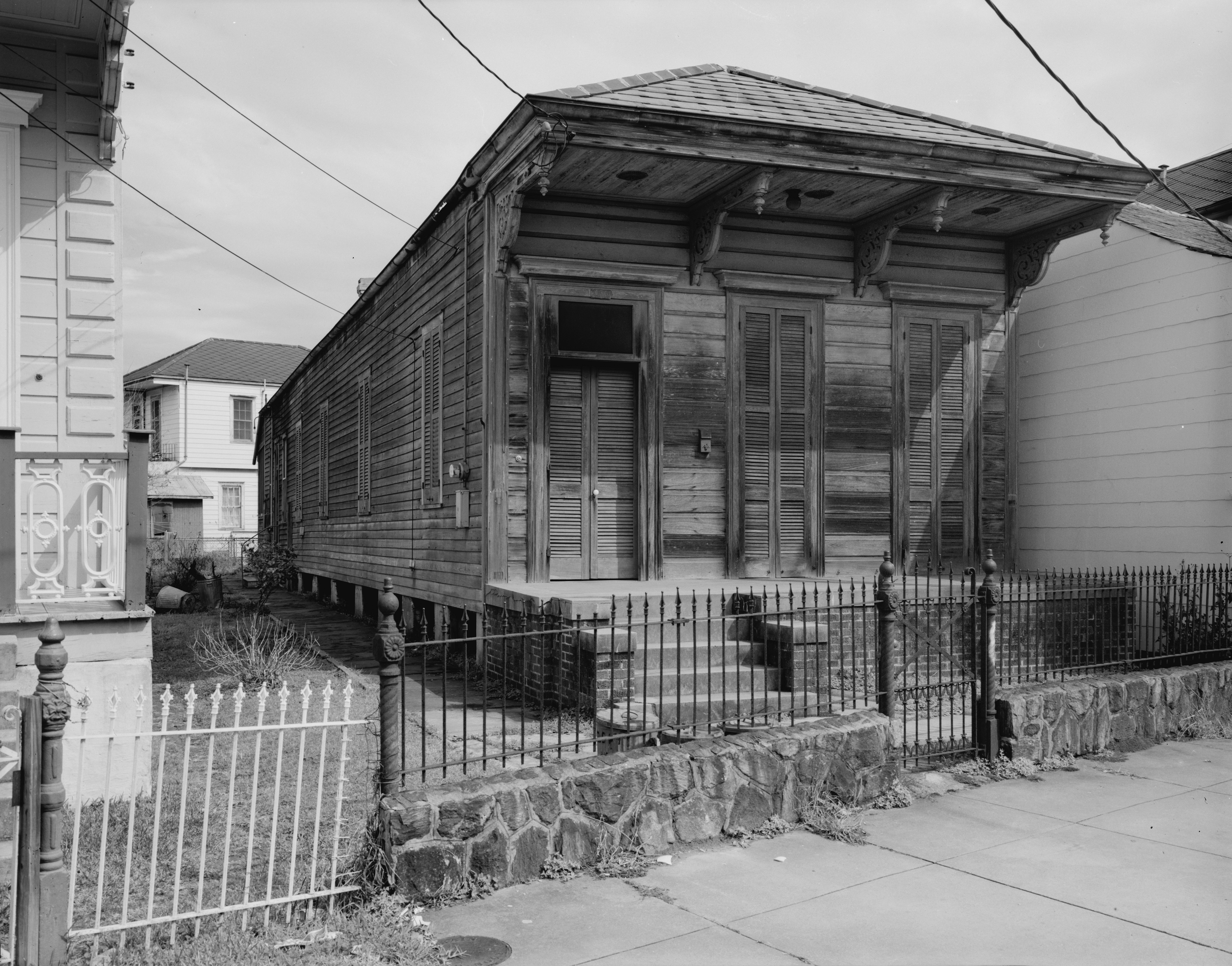
1979 photograph of 2519 Dauphine Street

As of the census of 2000, there were 3,145 people, 1,960 households, and 391 families residing in the neighborhood. The population density was 10,145 /mi² (3,931 /km²).

As of the census of 2010, there were 2,973 people, 1,881 households, and 359 families residing in the neighborhood.

== History ==
=== 19th century origins ===
The Faubourg Marigny was laid out in the first decade of the 19th century by Creole real estate developer and politician Bernard de Marigny, on land that had been his family's plantation just downriver from the old city limits of New Orleans.

The portion of the Faubourg Marigny closer to the river was built up first; the area on the side of St. Claude Avenue (formerly "Goodchildren Street") away from the river was sometimes called the New Marigny. In the early 19th century, the New Marigny was where white Creole gentlemen set up households for their mistresses of color (and their offspring) in the tradition of "plaçage".

Wide Elysian Fields Avenue, named after the Champs-Élysées in Paris, was designed to be the main street of the faubourg. It was the first street in the New Orleans area to extend directly from the riverfront to Lake Pontchartrain 8 km (5.0 mi) away. In 1830-31 the Pontchartrain Railroad was built, with its tracks down the center of Elysian Fields. (The area at the other end of the rail line developed into Milneburg.)

=== 20th century & beyond ===
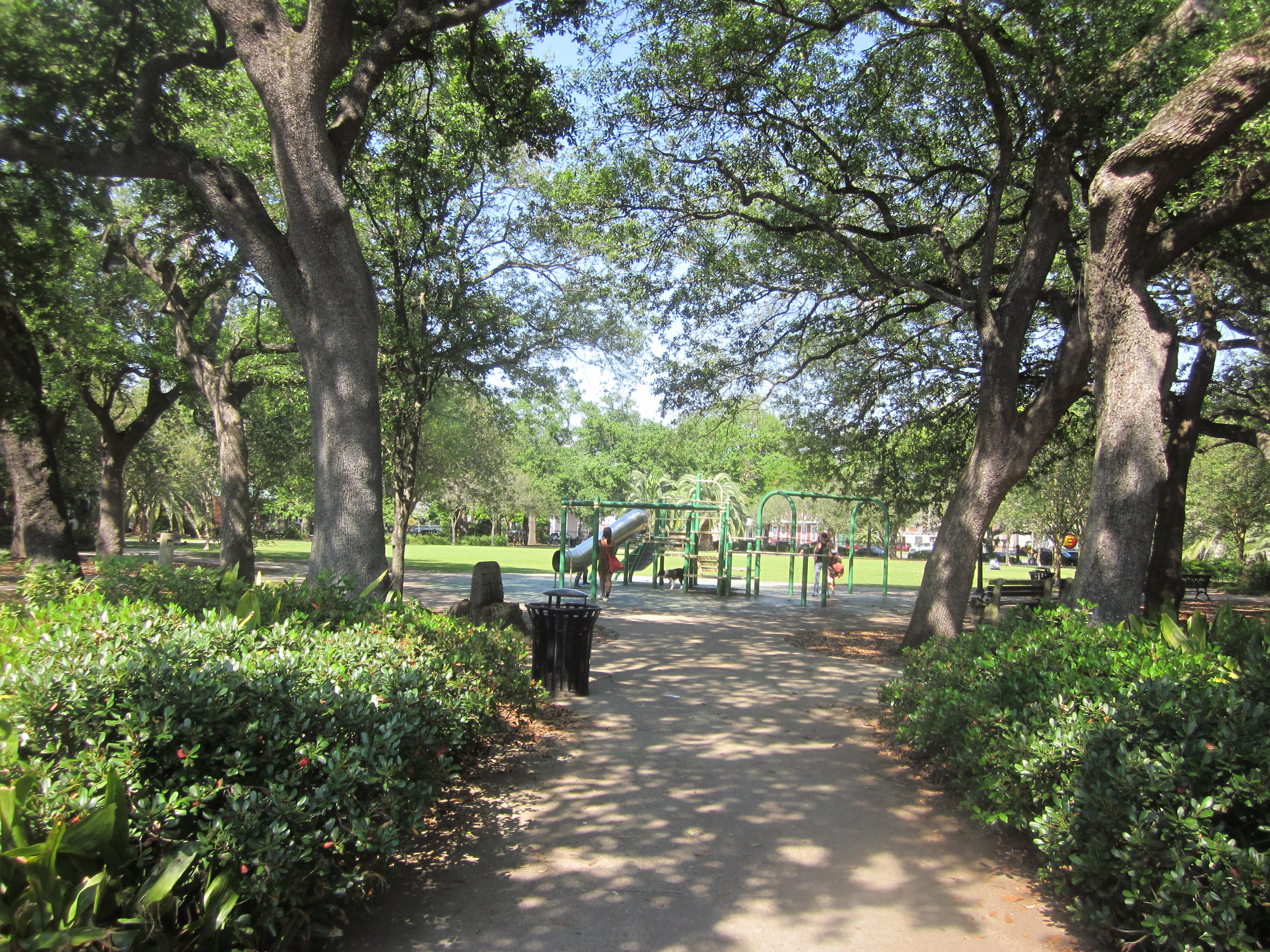
Washington Square park, playground view

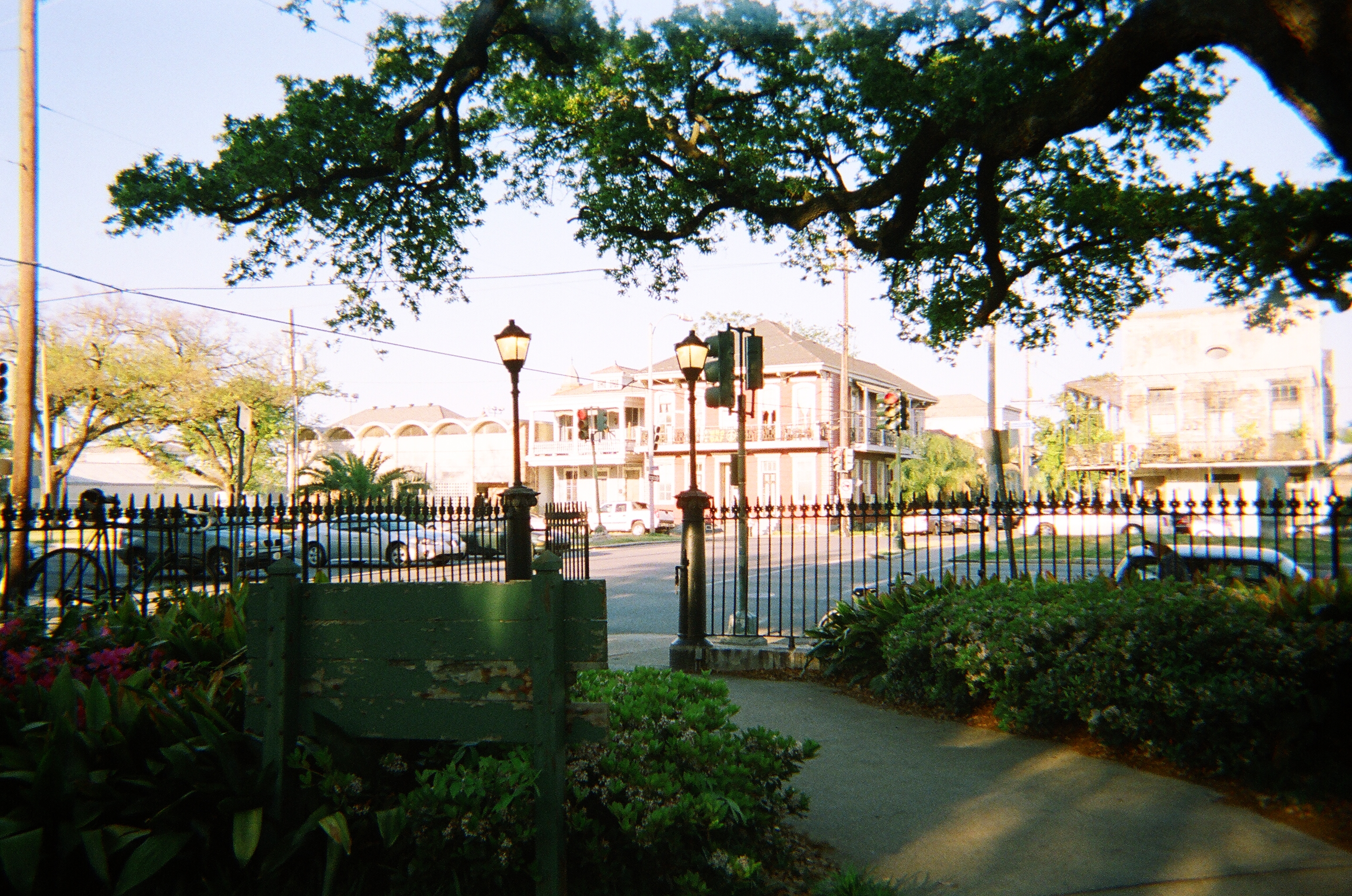
Washington Square, looking toward Elysian Fields Avenue

The neighborhood declined badly in the mid-20th century, and the area around Washington Square was nicknamed "Little Angola" (after the prison of that name) for the dangerous criminals there. After Hurricane Betsy many Filipino Americans who had been displaced by the hurricane called the neighborhood home. It came back strongly in the late 20th century.

Profiteering related to the 1984 World's Fair drove many long-term French Quarter residents into the Marigny. Frenchmen Street developed one of the city's premier locations for live music venues and restaurants and is a destination for music devotees. The neighborhood is also home to the New Orleans Center for Creative Arts riverfront facility.

The Faubourg Marigny is one of the city's most colorful neighborhoods; the architecture borrows heavily from the colonial French and Spanish and has elements of the Caribbean. This blending of cultures over time has resulted in a unique architectural style. The Marigny is one of the centers for homegrown New Orleans Mardi Gras (see Faubourg Marigny Mardi Gras costumes).

==== Hurricane Katrina recovery ====
Hurricane Katrina of late August 2005, which had a disastrous effect on most of New Orleans, had a less severe aftermath here. The section on the Mississippi River side of Rampart experienced some wind damage, but it was at a high enough elevation to escape the great flood. The lower-lying areas of New Marigny flooded, but not as deeply as elsewhere. A good portion of the 19th-century-style raised houses were elevated enough so that the flood waters did not do significant damage, even as far back as Claiborne Avenue.

A free community kitchen and goods-exchange camp was set up in Washington Square for a couple of months after the storm. The official reopening of the Marigny was delayed in September and early October 2005 because initial decisions were made to reopen areas by ZIP code, and the Faubourg Marigny shared a ZIP code with more badly damaged areas. After reopening, the area rebounded quickly.

== Education ==
The neighborhood is in the New Orleans Public Schools district.

The former Colton Middle School in Faubourg Marigny is now a Knowledge Is Power Program (KIPP) charter school, in the KIPP New Orleans Schools network.

== Notable people ==
- Jelly Roll Morton (1890–1941), jazz composer and musician
- Lizzie Miles (1895–1963), singer

== See also ==
- Desire Street
- Frenchmen Street
- New Orleans AIDS Monument
- New Orleans Center for Creative Arts
- Neighborhoods in New Orleans
