= Great Rift Valley (disambiguation) =

The Great Rift Valley is a series of connected geographic valleys from Lebanon to Mozambique.

Great Rift Valley may also refer to:

- Great Rift Valley, Ethiopia, branch of the East African Rift that runs southwest through Ethiopia
- Great Rift Valley, Kenya, part of the Gregory Rift that runs north to south through Kenya

== See also ==
- Rift valley (disambiguation)
- East African Rift
