= Esplanade Avenue, New Orleans =

Historic Street in New Orleans

Esplanade Avenue is a historic street in New Orleans, Louisiana. It runs northwest from the Mississippi River to Beauregard Circle at the entrance to City Park.

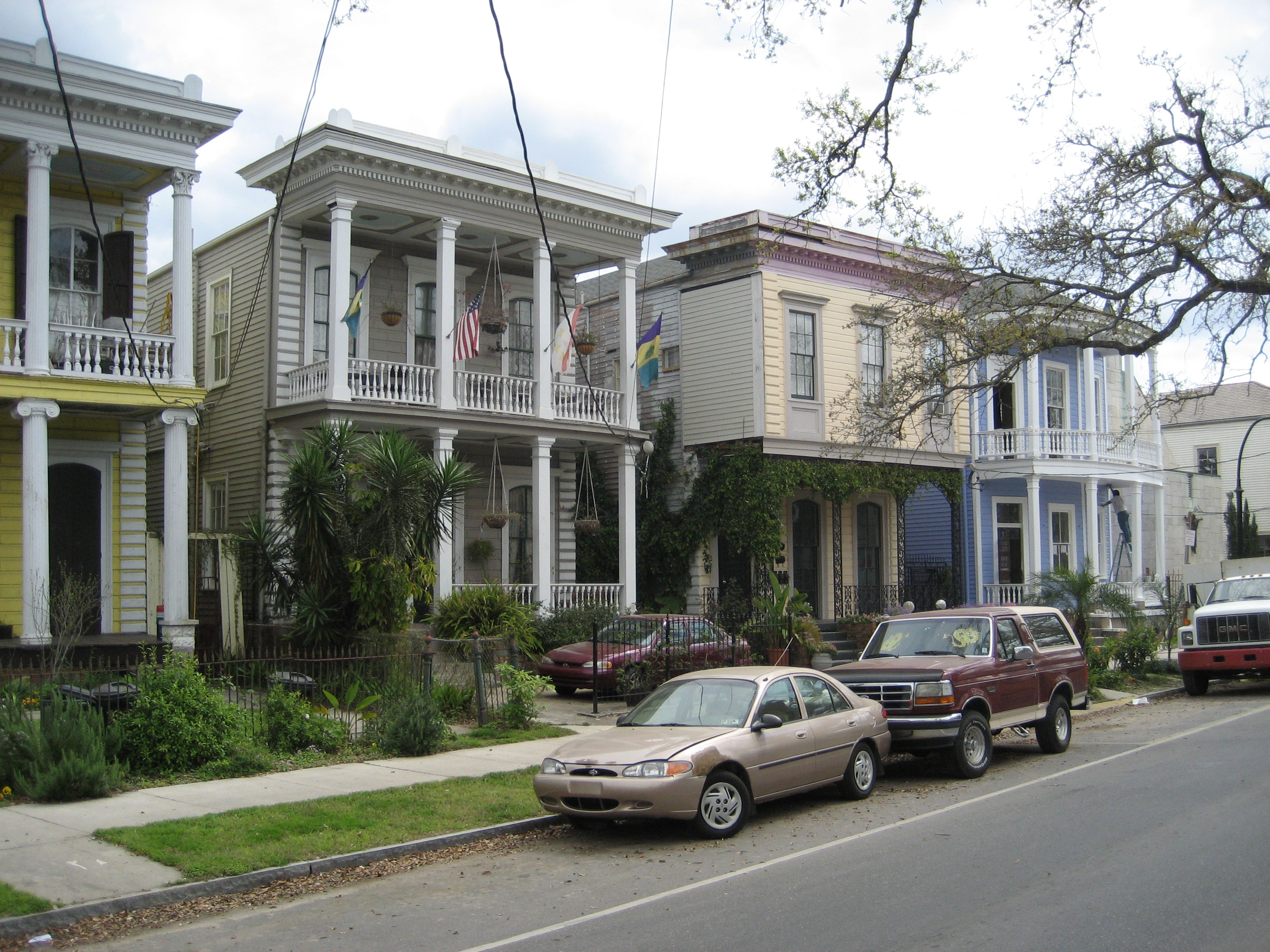
19th century residential architecture along Esplanade Avenue.

== History ==
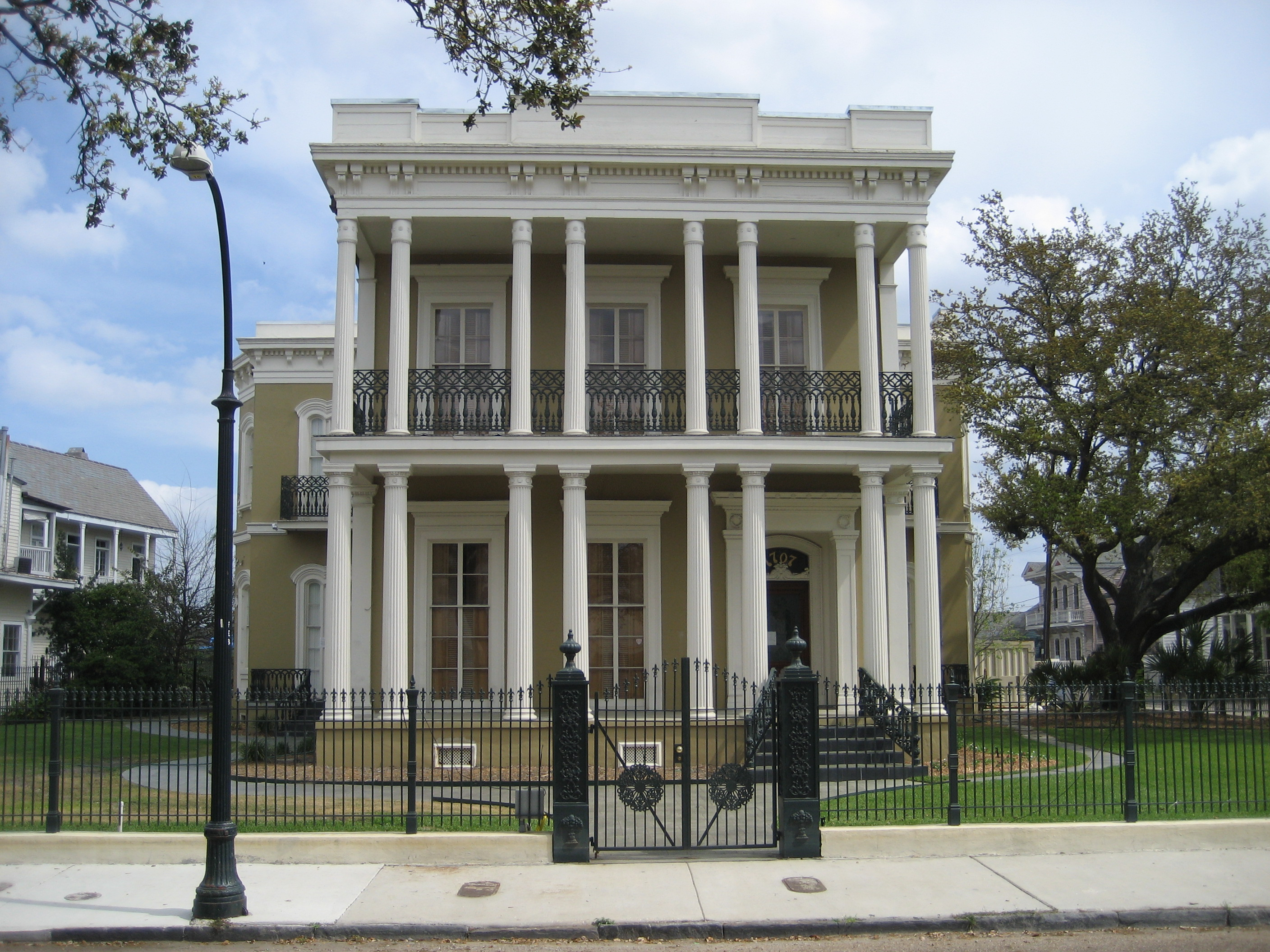
The Dufour-Baldwin House at 1707 Esplanade Avenue. It was completed in 1859.

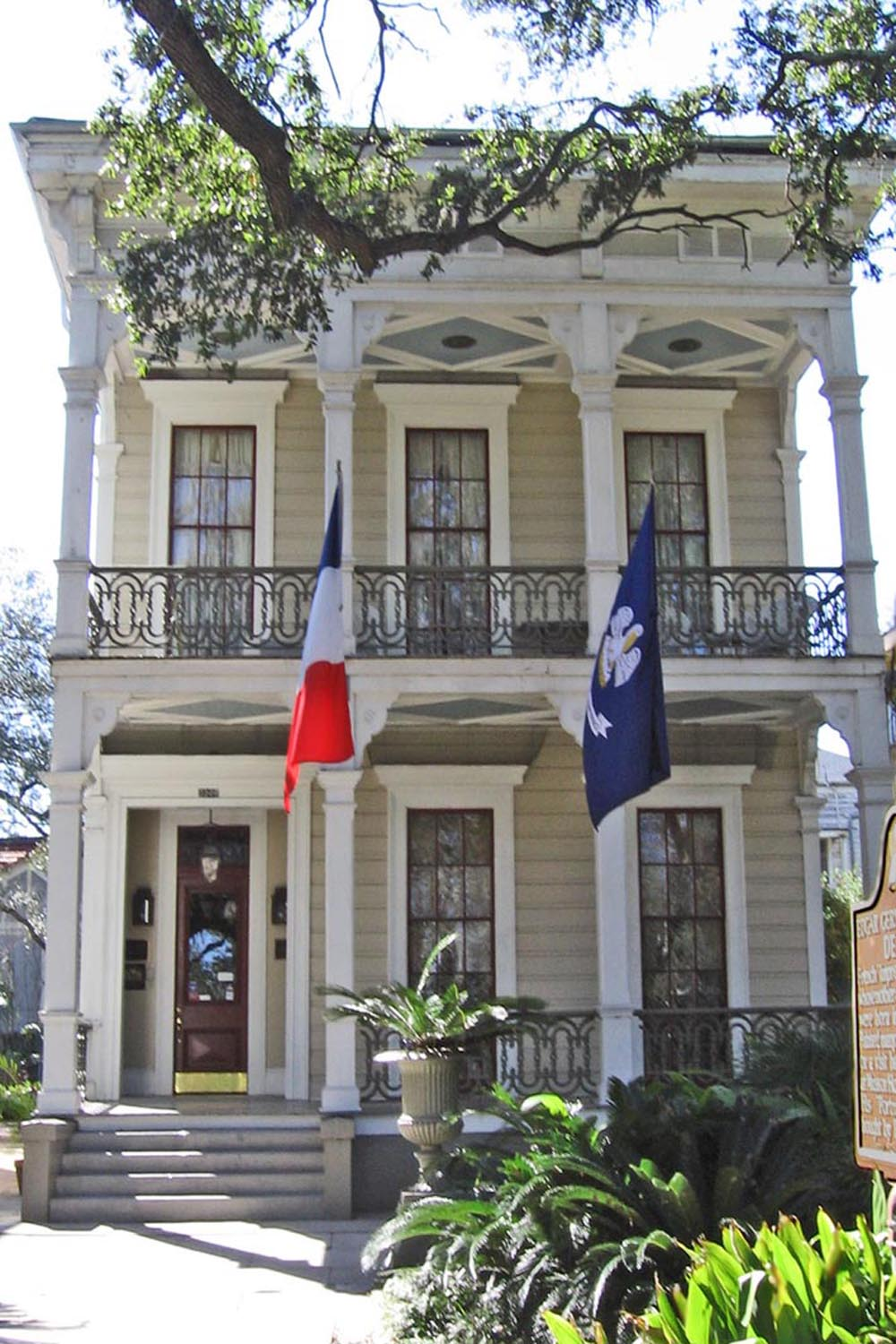
The Musson House, now known as the Degas House, at 2306 Esplanade Avenue. The artist Edgar Degas stayed here with his Musson relatives during 1872–73. The house was completed in 1852.

Esplanade Avenue was an important 18th-century portage route of trade between Bayou St. John, which linked to Lake Pontchartrain, and the River. Many 19th-century mansions still line the street; it functioned as a "millionaires row" for the Creole section of the city similar to that of St. Charles Avenue for the Anglophone section in uptown New Orleans.

Esplanade Avenue is the dividing line between the 6th and 7th Wards of the city.

From the River to Claiborne Avenue, Esplanade has one lane of traffic in both directions, with a raised neutral ground (median) in the center. From Claiborne to Carrollton Avenue it has one traffic lane in each direction, a dedicated bicycle lane, and a smaller neutral ground.

The segment from the River to Rampart Street separates the French Quarter from the Faubourg Marigny. Near the river on the French Quarter side is the old New Orleans Mint building.

Passing by the Faubourg Treme neighborhood, Esplanade goes through the area known alternatively as Faubourg St. John or Esplanade Ridge, near the New Orleans Fairgrounds. The house where Edgar Degas stayed during his time in New Orleans is in this section.

Just past Carrollton Avenue is the entrance to the New Orleans Museum of Art.

== Location ==
Point	Coordinates (links to map & photo sources)	Notes
Mississippi River/Peters Street	29.9614°N 90.0578°W	
Mid-point/Miro Street	29.9730°N 90.0738°W	Approximate
Beauregard Circle	29.9840°N 90.0899°W	

== See also ==
- New Orleans Mint
- Buildings and architecture of New Orleans
- List of streets of New Orleans
- General Beauregard Equestrian Statue, until 2017 located in Beauregard Circle
- Media related to Esplanade Avenue, New Orleans at Wikimedia Commons
