= Rift (2019 film) =

- Directed by: Biodun Stephen
- Produced by: Elizabeth Uhuegbu
- Starring: Enado Odigie; Kenneth Okolie; Emem Ufot; Eloho Festus; Ray Emodi
- Release date: 2019
- Country: Nigeria

Rift is a 2019 Nigerian movie directed by Biodun Stephen and produced by Elizabeth Uhuegbu.

== Plot ==
The movie tells a story of how a couple were living happily together until the man started to distance himself from the woman. The wife felt her husband was cheating on her so she decided to get closer to him but to no avail. Another man came into the picture of the woman, leading to many challenges.

== Cast ==
- Enado Odigie
- Kenneth Okolie
- Emem Ufot
- Eloho Festus
- Ray Emodi
- Biodun Stephen
