= George H. Buck Jr. Jazz Foundation =

The George H. Buck Jr. Jazz Foundation was created by George Buck in the 1980s to maintain the catalog of his jazz record labels. The catalog includes dixieland jazz, swing, blues, rhythm and blues, gospel, and cabaret music.

== History ==
Jazzology Records began when Buck commissioned a recording session in New York City on August 16, 1949. He was a college student who had been hosting a radio show for two years called Jazzology. The session consisted of Wild Bill Davison on coronet, Jimmy Archey on trombone, Tony Parenti on clarinet, Art Hodes on piano, Pops Foster on double bass, and Arthur Trappier on drums. He started GHB Records in the 1950s when he bought an album from Paradox Records, which was closing. He planned to use GHB for New Orleans jazz and Jazzology for Chicago jazz. During the 1960s he bought the labels Circle, Jazz Crusade, Icon, Mono, and Southland. With help from a bank loan and loyal customers, he bought World Transcriptions, a company that since the 1930 had provided prerecorded radio programs to independent jazz stations. During the 1970s and 1980s, he bought Audiophile Records, Progressive, Paramount, Monmouth-Evergreen, American Music Records, and Lang-Worth Transcription Company. In the 1980s, Buck moved Jazzology from Atlanta to New Orleans. He and his wife lived in the French Quarter and ran the Palm Court Jazz Café.

In 1979, it acquired Solo Art Records, which initially was purchased by Rudi Blesh and Harriet Janis from the original owner in 1946, and run alongside their Circle label. It had issued recordings of solo jazz and blues piano on 78 rpm discs.

== Notable musicians ==
- Red Allen
- Alvin Alcorn
- Albert Ammons
- Jimmy Archey
- Louis Armstrong
- Paul Barbarin
- Sweet Emma Barrett
- Ray Bauduc
- Sidney Bechet
- Barney Bigard
- Sharkey Bonano
- Big Bill Broonzy
- Pete Brown
- George Brunis
- Albert Burbank
- Raymond Burke
- Gus Cannon
- Rosemary Clooney
- Eddie Condon
- Bob Crosby
- Joe Darensbourg
- Cow Cow Davenport
- Wild Bill Davison
- Vic Dickenson
- Baby Dodds
- Johnny Dodds
- Tommy Dorsey
- Duke Ellington
- Don Ewell
- Pops Foster
- Pete Fountain
- Cié Frazier
- Bud Freeman
- George Guesnon
- Edmond Hall
- Fletcher Henderson
- Milt Hinton
- Art Hodes
- Kid Howard
- Blind Lemon Jefferson
- Bunk Johnson
- Pete Johnson
- Hank Jones
- Jonah Jones
- Lee Konitz
- Tommy Ladnier
- George Lewis
- Meade Lux Lewis
- Cripple Clarence Lofton
- Max Kaminsky
- Brownie & Stick McGee
- Jimmy McPartland
- Eddie Miller
- Punch Miller
- Jelly Roll Morton
- Ray Nance
- Albert Nicholas
- Wooden Joe Nicholas
- Hot Lips Page
- Tony Parenti
- Charlie Patton
- Piano Red
- Billie Pierce
- Sammy Price
- Alton Purnell
- Ma Rainey
- Luckey Roberts
- Jim Robinson
- Pee Wee Russell
- Harry Shields
- Rex Stewart
- Sonny Stitt
- Maxine Sullivan
- Ralph Sutton
- Roosevelt Sykes
- Mel Tormé
- Joe Turner
- Kid Thomas Valentine
- Ben Webster
- Dick Wellstood
- George Wettling
- Johnny Wiggs
- Lee Wiley
- Dave "Fat Man" Williams
- Robert Pete Williams
- Jimmy Yancey
- Louis Jordan
