= Circle Records =

Record label

- Parent company: Jazzology
- Founded: 1946
- Founder: Rudi Blesh; Harriet Janis
- Genre: Jazz
- Country of origin: U.S.
- Location: New Orleans
- Official website: www.jazzology.com

Circle Records is a jazz record label founded in 1946 by Rudi Blesh and Harriet Janis.

== History ==
In New York, Blesh and Janis heard jazz drummer Warren "Baby" Dodds playing inventive solos with Bunk Johnson's band. Blesh said he hated drum solos until he saw Dodds. To record Dodds and others, they started Circle Records. The name was given by fellow audience member Marcel Duchamp.

Circle recorded traditional jazz of the time, and its releases included Chippie Hill, George Lewis, and broadcasts of Blesh's This is Jazz radio show. The label was the first to release Jelly Roll Morton's Library of Congress recordings. Blesh and Janis continued the label until 1952. Circle Records also released modern classical music by artists including Henry Cowell and Paul Hindemith.

Circle was bought in the mid-1960s by George H. Buck, Jr. The Circle catalog is now under the control of the George H. Buck Jr. Jazz Foundation. Some of the original Circle recordings have been reissued on compact disc through other labels controlled by the George H. Buck Jr. Jazz Foundation, including American Music, Southland, (Note: Material from Circle Records album S-3 by Dan Burley has been reissued on Southland SCD-9.) and Jazzology. (Note: Material from Circle Records album S-8 has been reissued on Jazzology JCD-21.)

This Circle Records is not to be confused with the German record label of the same name.

== Selected label discography: 1946–1952 ==
The first record issued by Circle Records was by the Baby Dodds Trio. Many of their subsequent releases were albums of from two to four 10-inch, 78 rpm shellac records, issued in a binder. Many of the albums included cover art by Jimmy Ernst or Charles Alston.

Catalog No.	Artist	Title	Personnel	Notes
J-1001	Baby Dodds Trio	"Wolverine Blues / Drum Improvisation No. 1"	Clarinet– Albert Nicholas; Piano – Don Ewell; Drums – Baby Dodds	Later included on Circle album S-17
C-1	Chippie Hill	"Chippie Hill And The Blues: Now Appearing At The Village Vanguard"	Trumpet – Lee Collins; Piano – Lovie Austin, J.H. Shayne; Bass – John Lindsay; Drums – Baby Dodds	Two 78 rpm records. Reissued on Riverside Records RLP 1059
S-1	Original Zenith Brass Band	"Marching Jazz" (Note: Several members of the Original Zenith Brass Band, including Jim Robinson, George Lewis, and Baby Dodds, had previously recorded as members of a brass band led by Bunk Johnson for Bill Russell's American Music label.)	Trumpet – Kid Howard, Peter Bocage; Trombone – Jim Robinson; Clarinet – George Lewis; Baritone Horn – Harrison Barnes; Mellophone – Isidore Barbarin; Tuba – Joe Howard; Bass Drum – Lawrence Marrero; Snare Drum – Baby Dodds	Cover art by Charles Alston. Three 78 rpm records. Reissued on Riverside Records RLP 1058
S-2	Montana Taylor	"Barrel House Blues"	Piano – Montana Taylor	Three 78 rpm records.
S-3	Dan Burley	"South Side Shake"	Guitar – Brownie McGhee, Globe Trotter McGhee; Piano – Dan Burley; Bass – Pops Foster	Three 78 rpm records.
S-8	Tony Parenti's Ragtimers	"The Ragtime Band"	Cornet – Wild Bill Davison; Trombone – Jimmy Archey; Clarinet – Tony Parenti; Piano – Ralph Sutton; Banjo – Danny Barker; Tuba – Cy St. Clair; Drums – Baby Dodds	Three 78 rpm records. Reissued on Riverside Records RLP 12-205
S-9	Wild Bill Davison	"Wild Bill Davison Showcase"	Cornet – Wild Bill Davison; Trombone – Jimmy Archey; Clarinet, Bassoon – Garvin Bushell; Piano, Celeste – Ralph Sutton; Bass – Sid Weiss; Drums – Morey Feld	Three 78 rpm records. Reissued on Circle Records LP L-405
S-15	The All Star Stompers	"This Is Jazz, Vol. 3"	Cornet – Wild Bill Davison; Trombone – Jimmy Archey; Clarinet – Edmond Hall, Albert Nicholas; Piano – Ralph Sutton, James P. Johnson; Guitar – Danny Barker; Bass – Pops Foster; Drums – Baby Dodds	Three 78 rpm records. Material recorded for Rudi Blesh's radio show “This Is Jazz”
S-20	Ralph Sutton	"St. Louis Piano"	Piano – Ralph Sutton	Two 78 rpm records.
S-21	Tony Parenti's Ragpickers	"Tony Parenti's Ragpickers"	Clarinet – Tony Parenti; Piano – Ralph Sutton; Drums – George Wettling	Three 78 rpm records. Reissued on Riverside Records RLP 12-205
L-51-100	Paul Hindemith	Four Compositions By Paul Hindemith		Released on LP. Part of the Composer's Workshop series.
L-51-101	Henry Cowell	The Piano Music Of Henry Cowell		Released on LP. Part of the Composer's Workshop series.
Vol. I to Vol. XII	Jelly Roll Morton	"The Saga Of Mr. Jelly Lord"	Piano, Vocals – Jelly Roll Morton	The Library of Congress recordings, released as a series of albums with three or four 78 rpm red vinyl records. Reissued by Circle as L 14001 to L 14012; and by Riverside as RLP 9001 to RLP 9012.

== Circle Records today ==
Circle Records was reactivated and is used by the George H. Buck Jr. Jazz Foundation to release swing music. The reactivated Circle label put out recordings from the Lang-Worth and World transcriptions.

- Ray Anthony
- Charlie Barnet
- Count Basie
- Les Brown
- Frankie Carle
- Bill Challis
- Bob Crosby
- Xavier Cugat
- Jimmy Dorsey
- Tommy Dorsey
- Duke Ellington
- Ziggy Elman
- Vince Giordano
- Benny Goodman
- Glen Gray
- Woody Herman
- Dean Hudson
- Harry James
- Henry Jerome
- Jonah Jones
- Louis Jordan
- Sammy Kaye
- Hal Kemp
- John Kirby
- Gene Krupa
- Don Lamond
- Jimmie Lunceford
- Clyde McCoy
- Jimmy McPartland
- Glenn Miller
- Russ Morgan
- Ray Nance
- Don Neely
- Ray Noble
- Red Norvo
- Tony Pastor
- Teddy Powell
- Boyd Raeburn
- Charlie Spivak
- Maxine Sullivan
- Claude Thornhill
- Chick Webb
- Bob Wilber
- Clarence Williams

== See also ==
- List of record labels
