= Jazzology Records =

American jazz record company and label

- Parent company: Jazzology/George H. Buck Foundation
- Founded: 1949
- Founder: George H. Buck, Jr.
- Genre: Jazz
- Country of origin: U.S.
- Location: New Orleans, Louisiana
- Official website: www.jazzology.com

Jazzology Records is an American jazz record company and label. It is part of the Jazzology group of labels owned and operated by the George H. Buck Jr. Jazz Foundation.

Jazzology Records was founded in 1949 by George H. Buck, Jr. That year he recorded Art Hodes, Wild Bill Davison, and Tony Parenti. Buck did not record again until 1954, when he created his GHB Records label to concentrate on Dixieland jazz. Over time he released music on other labels that he acquired: American Music Records, Audiophile, Black Swan, Circle, Progressive, Solo Art, and Southland.

== Roster ==
- Red Allen
- Donald Ashwander
- Jimmy Archey
- Kenny Ball
- Sidney Bechet
- Barney Bigard
- George Brunies
- Billy Butterfield
- Ernie Carson
- Sid Catlett
- Doc Cheatham
- Evan Christopher
- Bill Coleman
- Eddie Condon
- Kenny Davern
- Wild Bill Davison
- Baby Dodds
- Don Ewell
- Pops Foster
- Pete Fountain
- Bud Freeman
- Marty Grosz
- Bobby Hackett
- Bob Haggart
- Edmond Hall
- Herb Hall
- Chuck Hedges
- Duke Heitger
- Earl Hines
- Art Hodes
- Max Kaminsky
- Tim Laughlin
- Yank Lawson
- Cliff Leeman
- George Lewis
- Jimmy McPartland
- Eddie Miller
- Miff Mole
- Max Morath
- Red Nichols
- Tony Parenti
- Ed Polcer
- Ben Pollack
- Trevor Richards
- Tom Roberts
- Pee Wee Russell
- Randy Sandke
- Bob Scobey
- Zutty Singleton
- Willie "The Lion" Smith
- Muggsy Spanier
- Jess Stacy
- Rex Stewart
- Ralph Sutton
- Jack Teagarden
- Butch Thompson
- Warren Vaché Sr.
- Warren Vaché Jr.
- Dicky Wells
- George Wettling
- Bob Wilber
- Teddy Wilson
- World's Greatest Jazz Band
- Knocky Parker
