= Knocky Parker =

American jazz musician

Knocky Parker (August 8, 1918, Palmer, Texas – September 3, 1986, Los Angeles, California), born John William Parker, II, was an American jazz pianist. He played primarily ragtime and Dixieland jazz.

A native of Texas, Parker played in the Western swing bands The Wanderers (1935) and the Light Crust Doughboys (1937–39) before serving in the military during World War II.

After the war he worked with Zutty Singleton and Albert Nicholas. He became an English professor at Kentucky Wesleyan College and the University of South Florida. On the side, he played piano with Tony Parenti, Omer Simeon and Doc Evans. He recorded albums for Euphonic, GHB, Jazzology, London, Progressive, Paradox, Audiophile and Texstar. At Audiophile, he was one of the first to record all known ragtime pieces by Scott Joplin, excluding "The Silver Swan", which was not discovered at that point.

In 1984, he was nominated for a Grammy Award with Big Joe Turner for Big Joe Turner with Knocky Parker and His Houserockers.

== Discography ==
- In Gay Old New Orleans with Dick Wellstood (Progressive, 1950)
- Piano Artistry (Audiophile, 1955)
- Old Blues (Audiophile, 1958)
- Old Rags (Audiophile, 1958)
- The Complete Piano Works of Scott Joplin (Audiophile, 1960)
- The Complete Piano Works of Jelly Roll Morton (Audiophile, 1960)
- The Complete Works of James Scott (Audiophile, 1962)
- Golden Treasury of Ragtime (Audiophile, 1970)
- Eight on Eighty Eight (Euphonic, 1977)
- Classic Rags and Nostalgia at the Old Town Music Hall (Euphonic, 1978)
- From Cakewalk to Ragtime (Jazzology, 1979)
- From Ragtime to Ballroom (Jazzology, 1979)
- Knocky Parker and His Cakewalking Jazz Band (GHB, 1981)
- In Gay Old New Orleans with Dick Wellstood (GHB, 1989)
- The Complete Piano Works of Jelly Roll Morton (Solo Art, 1994)
- The Complete Piano Works of Scott Joplin (Solo Art, 2002)
- From Cakewalk to Ragtime to Ballroom (Solo Art, 2010)
