= Tony Parenti =

American jazz clarinetist and saxophonist (1900–1972)

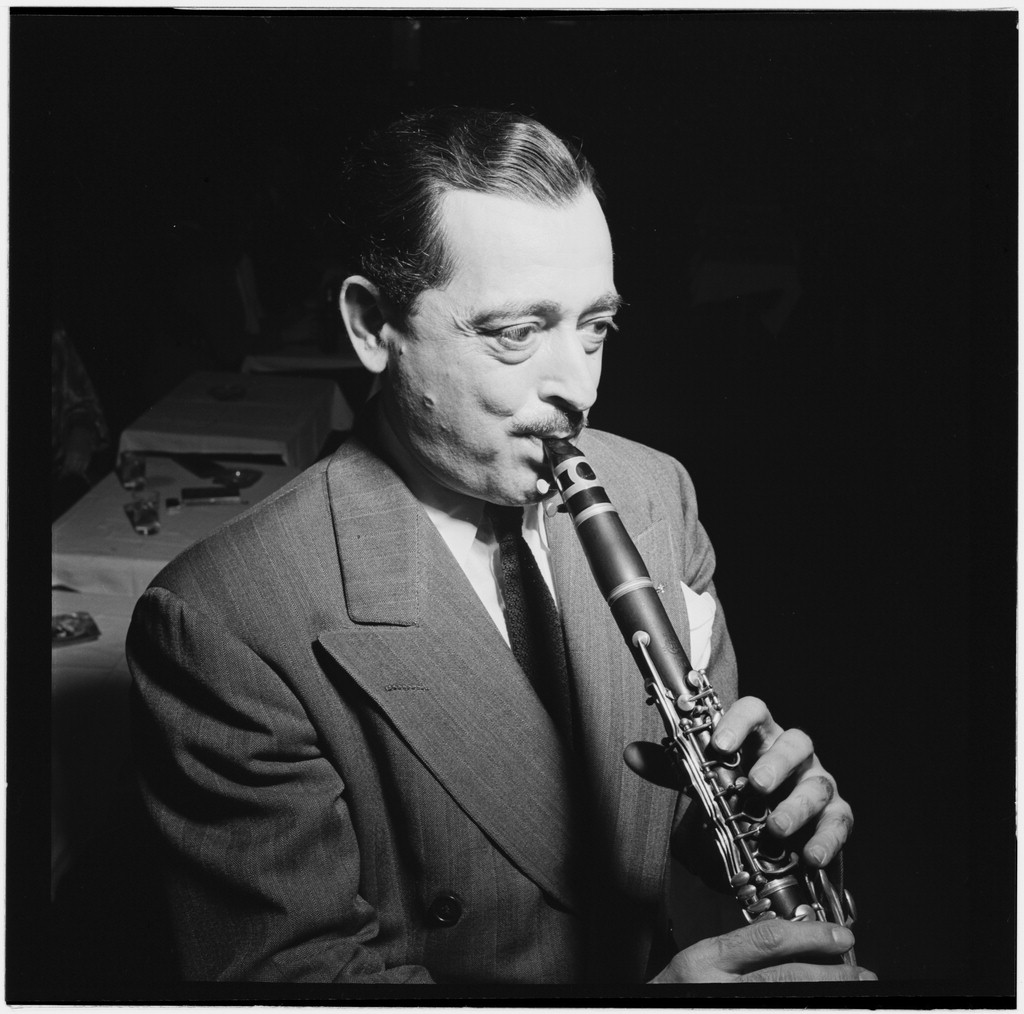

Background information
- Born: Antonio Parenti; August 6, 1900; New Orleans, Louisiana, United States
- Died: April 17, 1972 (aged 71)
- Genres: Jazz
- Instrument: Clarinet

Anthony Parenti (August 6, 1900 – April 17, 1972) was an American jazz clarinetist and saxophonist born in New Orleans, Louisiana, United States. After starting his musical career in New Orleans, he had a successful career in music in New York City for decades.

== Biography ==
Parenti was a childhood musical prodigy, first on violin, then on clarinet. As a child he substituted for Alcide Nunez in Papa Jack Laine's band. In New Orleans he also worked with Johnny Dedroit. During his early teens, Parenti worked with the Nick LaRocca band, among other local acts. Parenti led his own band in New Orleans in the mid-1920s, making his first recordings there, before moving to New York City at the end of the decade. In the late 1920s, Parenti worked with Benny Goodman and Fred Rich, and then in New York City, where he worked through the 1930s as a CBS staffman and as a member of the Radio City Symphony Orchestra.

From 1939 until 1945, Parenti, with Ted Lewis's band, played alongside Muggsy Spanier. In 1944, he recorded and appeared in concert with Sidney Bechet and Max Miller in Chicago.

In the 1940s and still in New York City, Parenti formed a Dixieland jazz band called Tony Parenti and His New Orleanians, and which featured Wild Bill Davison, Art Hodes and Jimmy Archey, among others. He often appeared at such New York jazz spots as Nick's and Jimmy Ryan’s, and also worked with Eddie Condon. Parenti remained active until the 1960s in clubs, and died in New York City on April 17, 1972.

Over his career, Parenti recorded on the labels of Jazzology, Southland and Fat Cat, among several others.

== Discography ==
- Que Records. 1957, Dixie By The "7" – Que JLS 5000

=== As leader ===
- Tony Parenti & His New Orleanians (Jazzology, 1949) with Wild Bill Davison, Jimmy Archey, Art Hodes, Pops Foster, Arthur Trappier
- Ragtime Jubilee (Jazzology)
- Ragtime! (Riverside Records 205)
- Tony Parenti & His Downtown Boys (Jazzology, 1955–65) with Dick Wellstood, Armand Hug
- Tony Parenti & His Ragtime Gang - Ragtime Jubilee (Jazzology J-21) the front cover reads: "Featuring Knocky Parker"
- The Final Bar (Jazzology, 1971) with Max Kaminsky, Charlie Bornemann, Bobby Pratt, Buzzy Drootin
