= Armand Hug =

American jazz pianist (1910–1977)

Armand Hug (December 6, 1910 – March 19, 1977) was an American jazz pianist.

He was born and raised in New Orleans, Louisiana, and spent most of his life there. When he was 13, he was playing professionally. In 1926 he joined a band led by Harry Shields, then was a member of the New Orleans Owls in 1928. He recorded for the first time in 1936, with Sharkey Bonano, though for most of his career he was known as a solo pianist. He played dixieland jazz in local clubs and hosted a local television show.

He died at the age of 66 in New Orleans.

== Discography ==
- Armand Hug (Circle, 1951)
- Armand Hug (Southland, 1954)
- Armand Hug plays Armand Piron (ABC-Paramount Records, 1955)
- Armand Hug & New Orleans Dixielanders ( Southland, 1958)
- New Orleans Piano (Golden Crest, 1958)
- Dixieland from New Orleans (Southland, 1959)
- Dixieland from the Southland (Southland, 1959)
- Armand Hug Plays Rags and Blues (Golden Crest, 1960)
- Armand Hug of New Orleans (Swaggie, 1971)
- Volume Two (Swaggie, 1974)
- Bix Hug (Jazzology, 1976)
- Piano Solos (Swaggie, 2002)
- Armand Hug Plays A. J. Piron & Other Delectable Ditties (GHB, 2012)
