= Big Band and Jazz Hall of Fame =

US-based music award

The Big Band and Jazz Hall of Fame is part of a US-based non-profit organization (The Big Band and Jazz Hall of Fame Foundation) that began operations in 1978 and continues to the present in San Diego County, California. David Larkin is the current president.

The board Vice President in 1997 Daniel Del Fiorentino.

The foundation's musical ensemble - the Big Band Jazz Hall of Fame Orchestra - continues to perform each year - primarily in the summer months in the San Diego North County area. Concerts scheduled in 2020 and 2021 were postponed and canceled due to the Covid Pandemic. Its first concerts back took place August 27, 2022 at the Willowbrook Concert Series in Vista, CA. Numerous Big Band/ Swing Era and Jazz artists have been guests with the ensemble over the years including: Herb Jeffries (Ellington & Earl Hines vocalist), Bill Watrous (trombone), Kevin Cole (piano) and Tad Calcara (principal clarinet of the Utah Symphony). The foundation continues to support local public school students with its yearly scholarship program.

== Big Band and Jazz Hall of Fame Inductees ==
=== 1978 ===
Louis Armstrong - Duke Ellington - Benny Goodman - Glenn Miller - Ella Fitzgerald - Roland Kirk

=== 1979 ===
Charlie Parker - Bix Beiderbecke - Fletcher Henderson - Miles Davis - Billie Holiday

=== 1980 ===
John Coltrane - James P. Johnson - Thelonious Monk - Earl Hines - Lester Young - Frank Sinatra

=== 1981 ===
Count Basie - Tommy Dorsey - Charlie Christian - Woody Herman - Buddy Rich - Billy Strayhorn - W. C. Handy - Bessie Smith

=== 1982 ===
Jelly Roll Morton - Stan Kenton - Art Blakey - Charles Mingus - Coleman Hawkins - Dizzy Gillespie - Bill Evans - Sarah Vaughan

=== 1983 ===
Sidney Bechet - Ben Webster - Wes Montgomery - Harry James - Stan Getz - Gene Krupa - Eddie Condon - Jimmy Dorsey - Eubie Blake - Ma Rainey

=== 1984 ===
King Oliver - Charlie Barnet - Claude Thornhill - Eric Dolphy - Chuck Berry - Gerry Mulligan - Django Reinhardt - Fats Navarro - Chick Webb - Carmen McRae

=== 1985 ===
Art Tatum - Roy Eldridge - Mary Lou Williams - Cannonball Adderley - Bunny Berigan - Jay McShann - Clifford Brown - Jack Teagarden - Illinois Jacquet - Billy Eckstine

=== 1986 ===
Red Nichols - Bunk Johnson - Lil Hardin Armstrong - Dave Brubeck - Kenny Clarke - Kid Ory - Gil Evans - Eddie Lang - Lionel Hampton - Johnny Hartman

=== 1987 ===
Pee Wee Russell - Willie Smith - Bennie Moten - Cab Calloway - Ray Noble - Sun Ra - Chet Baker - Jimmie Lunceford - Scott Joplin - Jimmie Noone - Dinah Washington

=== 1988 ===
Quincy Jones - J. J. Johnson - Dexter Gordon - Johnny Dodds - Buddy Tate - Billy May - Buddy Bolden - Benny Carter - Jimmy Rushing

=== 1989 ===
Ornette Coleman - Fats Waller - Frankie Carle - Milt Jackson - Shorty Rogers - Sonny Stitt - Isham Jones - Lawrence Welk - Mildred Bailey

=== 1990 ===
Artie Shaw - Buck Clayton - Kenny Burrell - Johnny Hodges - Don Redman - Jo Jones - Les Paul - Mel Tormé

=== 1991 ===
Horace Silver - Clarence Williams - Paul Desmond - Andy Kirk - Baby Dodds - Bud Powell - Max Roach - Red Norvo - Lena Horne

=== 1992 ===
Ben Pollack - Jimmy McPartland - Hal Kemp - Bud Freeman - Zoot Sims - Oscar Pettiford - Pops Foster - Sammy Kaye - Guy Lombardo - Peggy Lee

=== 1993 ===
James Moody - Budd Johnson - Louie Bellson - Meade Lux Lewis - Paul Whiteman - John Kirby - Cootie Williams - Erroll Garner - Louis Prima - Teddy Wilson - Nat King Cole

=== 1994 ===
Clark Terry - Freddie Hubbard - Sweets Edison - Paul Chambers - Stuff Smith - Raymond Scott - Jimmy Blanton - Wynton Kelly - Rex Stewart - Betty Carter

=== 1995 ===
Don Cherry - Oscar Peterson - Herbie Hancock - Red Allen - Thad Jones - Joe Pass - Tito Puente - Stéphane Grappelli - Joe Williams

=== 1996 ===
Wynton Marsalis - Tal Farlow - Doc Cheatham - Sid Catlett - Tex Beneke - Lucky Millinder - Al Cohn - Jess Stacy - Milton Hinton - Alberta Hunter

=== 1997 ===
Wild Bill Davison - Bobby Hackett - Pete Fountain - Ray Brown - Tony Williams - Freddie Keppard - Mel Powell - Muggsy Spanier - Charlie Shavers - Tony Bennett

=== 1998 ===
Eddie Miller - Dorothy Donegan - Wayne Shorter - Yank Lawson - Claude Hopkins - Adrian Rollini - Art Hodes - Will Bradley - Louis Jordan - Maxine Sullivan

=== 1999 ===
Sonny Rollins - Barney Kessel - Billy Taylor - Jonah Jones - Tommy Flanagan - Barry Harris - Marian McPartland - Nancy Wilson - Les Brown - Stanley Dance

=== 2000 ===
Joe Venuti - Harry Carney - Dave Tough - Sy Oliver - Hank Jones - Freddie Green - Chubby Jackson - McCoy Tyner - Ron Carter - Shirley Horn

=== 2001 ===
Art Farmer - Lawrence Brown - Lennie Tristano - Tadd Dameron - Jimmy Rowles - John Lewis - Terry Gibbs - Toshiko Akiyoshi - Gerald Wilson - Helen Forrest

=== 2002 ===
John Lewis - Buddy DeFranco - Lennie Tristano - Ralph Sutton - Shelly Manne - Art Pepper - Bing Crosby - Nina Simone - T-Bone Walker - Glen Gray's Casa Loma Orchestra - George Simon

=== 2003 ===
Bob Brookmeyer - Jim Hall - Toshiko Akiyoshi - Jimmy Rowles - Ray Nance - Scott LaFaro - Howard McGhee - J. C. Higginbotham - Bob Eberly - Jo Stafford - Eddie Sauter - B. B. King - Ted Weems - Norman Granz

=== 2004 ===
Mundell Lowe - Specs Powell - Paul Tanner - Gerald Wilson - Terry Gibbs - Tadd Dameron - Paul Gonsalves - Trummy Young - Perry Como - Martha Tilton - Sammy Nestico - Ray Charles - Bill McKinney - Helen Oakley Dance - Irving Berlin
