= George H. Buck Jr. =

George Herman Buck Jr.
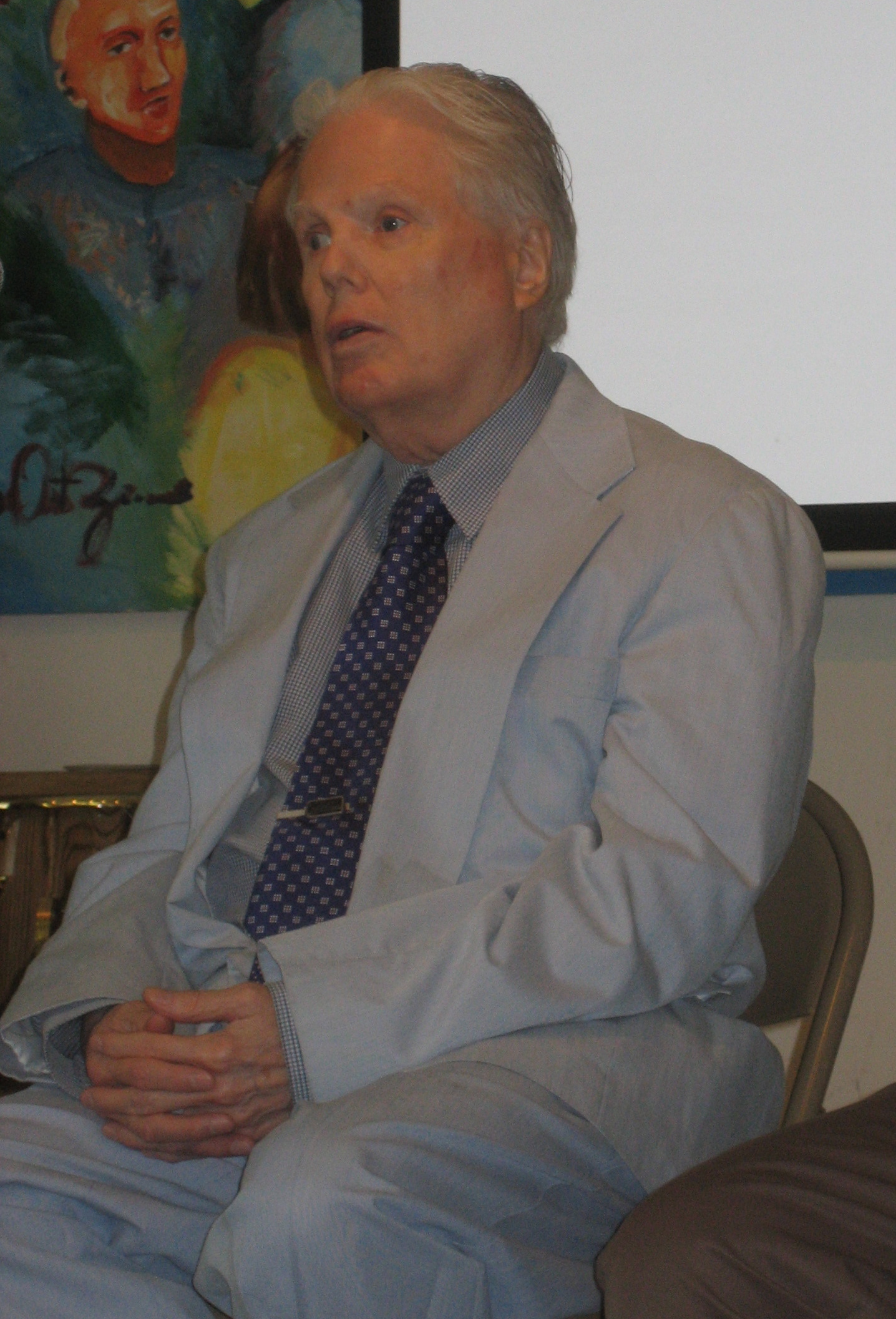
- Buck in 2006
- Born: December 22, 1928; New Jersey
- Died: December 11, 2013 (aged 84); New Orleans
- Occupation: Music business executive
- Organization(s): Jazzology; American Music Records; G.H.B. Records; Black Swan; Solo Art Records; Audiophile Records; Circle Records; Southland Records; Progressive Records; World Broadcasting; Langlois & Wentworth

George Herman Buck Jr. (December 22, 1928 – December 11, 2013) was an American entrepreneur who devoted much of his life to recording jazz by producing albums and acquiring the rights to those produced by companies established by others. Buck acquired the inventories of record labels and transcription discs made by radio broadcasting companies decades earlier. He was a major record collector. Until his death at age 84, he ran his businesses and philanthropy. He began his radio career as a partner in radio station WJNO in West Palm Beach.

== Career ==
Born December 22, 1928, in Elizabeth, New Jersey, Buck rose to prominence as the leading figure in the preservation and advancement of authentic traditional jazz. He started out selling newspapers during World War II and converting the profits into war bonds. He took this money and recorded his first session with his favorite musicians, Wild Bill Davison and Tony Parenti on Jazzology Records. Soon after, he began recording New Orleans style jazz on GHB Records. He began yearly pilgrimages to New Orleans in 1961, cementing his relationship with the city by immersing himself in the culture and recording the artists who lived in the city. Buck developed a passion for radio after hosting a radio show in college, which he dubbed, Jazzology. This early involvement in radio led him to buy many small, under performing radio stations beginning with WCOS in Columbia, South Carolina, and turn them around with new formats and improved management. All of his profits from this went to support his growing list of record labels. He started and bought many labels in order to make sure this music would survive. He issued recordings of most forms of jazz through nine labels: Jazzology, GHB, Circle, Southland, American Music, Black Swan, Audiophile, Progressive, and Solo Art.

According to his son, Buck's passion, love, and enthusiasm for jazz never diminished. He and his wife, Nina moved the operation to New Orleans in 1987 and in 1989 expanded further by opening the Palm Court Jazz Café, which became an important part of New Orleans jazz culture under the management of his wife. The GHB Jazz Foundation houses the record business and is located on the second floor of the same building in the French Quarter.

"My greatest pleasure is doing jazz." "I loved it from the first time I heard it. It spoke my language."

— George H. Buck

As of 4–2–2020, Buck's weekly program Jazzology continues to air on WAVO 1150-AM in Rock Hill, SC on Sundays from 4-5PM. He produced nearly 700 broadcasts during his years in New Orleans. The programs were originally recorded on cassettes. In recent years, most of the programs were transferred to compact discs. An archive of these programs is kept in New Orleans and at the WAVO studios in Charlotte, NC. Buck's sign off was "This is recordially yours, George Buck. Wishing you the best of everything and good jazz listening. Bye bye and buy bonds!"

== Buck companies ==
Companies founded by Buck

- Jazzology Records (founded 1949) — traditional Chicago style jazz
- G.H.B. Records — traditional New Orleans style jazz

Companies acquired by Buck

- American Music Records (founded 1944) — authentic New Orleans style jazz, acquired from founder and composer Bill Russell in 1990
- Black Swan Records (founded 1921) — re-issues of Paramount Records, acquired in the 1990s
- Solo Art Records — piano jazz
- Audiophile Records — classic American popular songs
- Circle Records (founded 1946) — big bands, acquired in the 1960s
- Southland Records (founded 1948) — authentic blues, acquired from its founder, Joseph P. Mares (1908–1991), in the 1960s
- Progressive Records (founded 1950) — modern music
- World Broadcasting System, Inc. (founded 1929) — entire library of radio transcription discs, acquired in 1971
- Langlois & Wentworth, Inc. (founded 1933) — entire library of radio transcription discs, acquired in 1982

Philanthropy founded by Buck

- The George H. Buck, Jr., Jazz Foundation, Inc. (founded 1987), a Louisiana non-profit entity.
