= Tom Roberts (pianist) =

American pianist (born 1962)

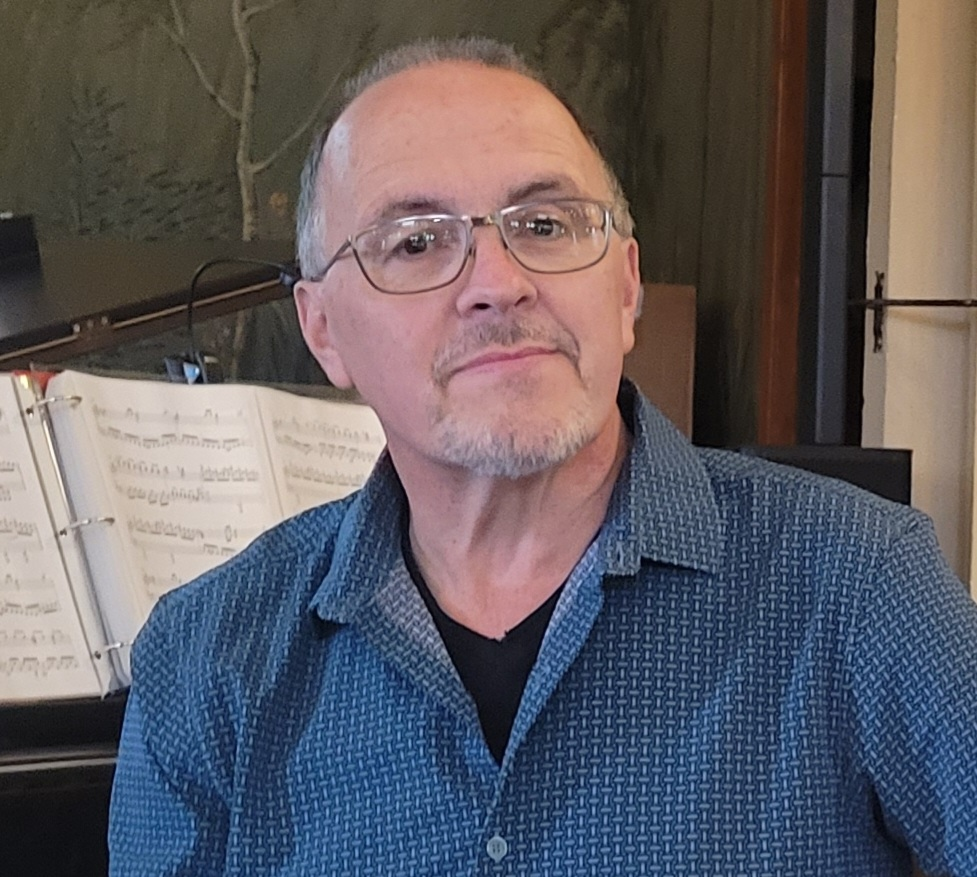
- Roberts c. 2022
- Born: Pittsburgh, Pennsylvania, U.S.
- Occupations: Musician; arranger; songwriter; composer
- Musical career
- Instruments: piano; vocals; trumpet; ukelele
- Labels: Solo Art; Stomp Off; Sony Music; Audiophile; Black Knight Records; Azica; ZYX Records; Jazzology Records; GHB Records; Good Time Jazz
- Formerly of: Vince Giordano and the Nighthawks
- Website: tomrobertspiano.com

Tom Roberts (born 1962) is an American pianist, composer, and arranger, a specialist in the stride piano style, and an expert on early jazz piano and jazz recordings. Tom is a master of all early jazz piano styles including ragtime, boogie woogie, swing, New Orleans jazz, and Harlen Stride piano.

== Early years ==
Tom Roberts grew up in Swisshelm Park, a suburb of Pittsburgh, Pennsylvania, and was the eldest of three brothers. His grandparents lived across the street and Roberts learned to play piano on his grandmother's player piano. He graduated from Duquesne University and taught high school music at Schenley High School for three years while continuing to pursue his goal of performing jazz. After giving Leon Redbone an audition tape, he caught the man's attention and Redbone offered Roberts a contract to go on tour with him. In Roberts's first performance on that tour, he played on stage at The Tonight Show

== Career ==
=== New Orleans ===
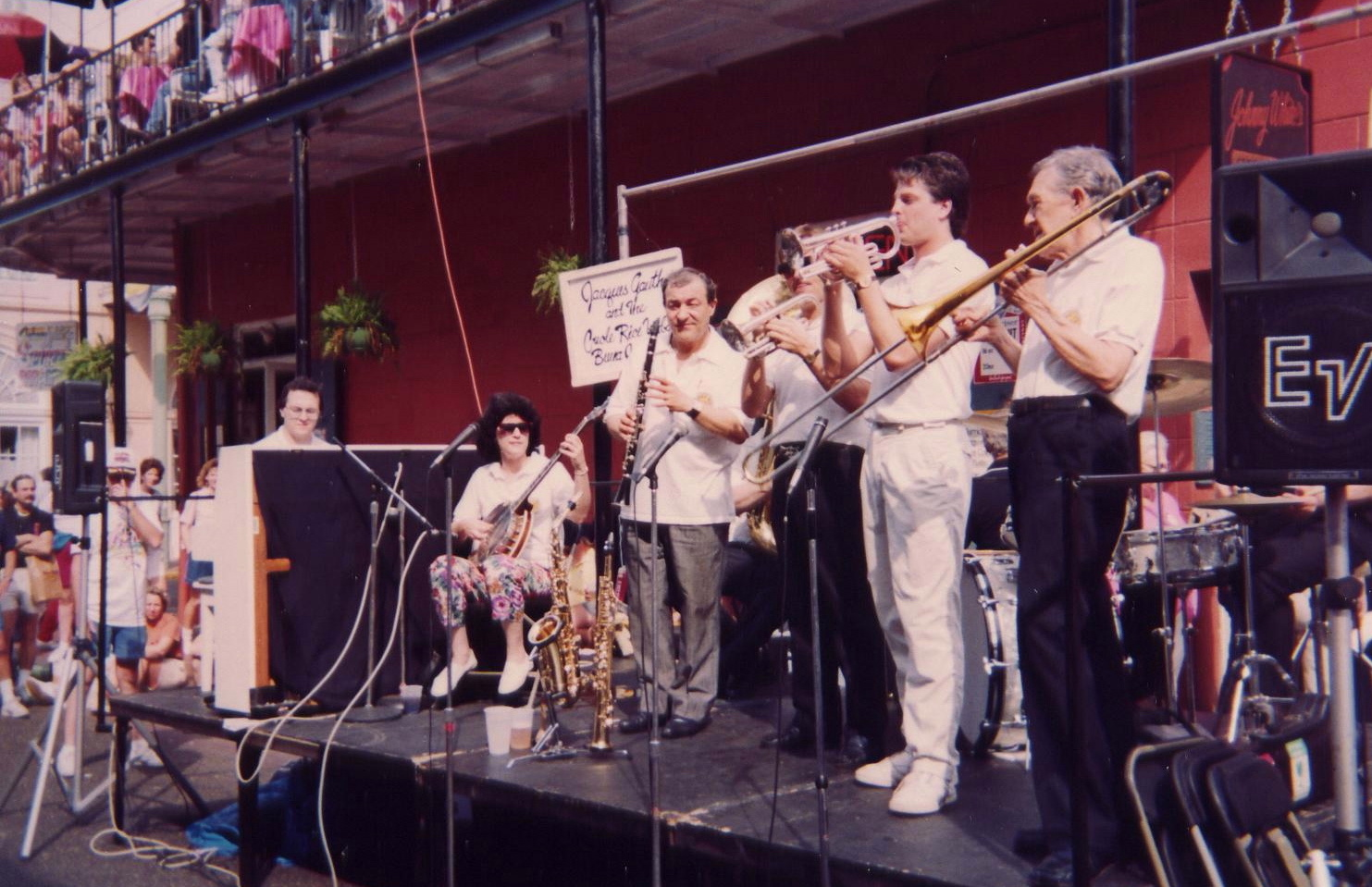
Jacques Gauthe Creole Rice Jazz Band, French Quarter Festival, New Orleans. Visible musicians: Tom Roberts, piano; Amy Sharpe, banjo; Jacques Gauthe, clarinet & saxes; Duke Heitger, cornet; Tom Ebert, trombone.

Following his first tour with Redbone, Roberts moved to New Orleans in 1989 where he subsequently performed in all the major jazz clubs in the French Quarter including Preservation Hall, as well as on many New Orleans riverboats. Most notably, he performed with The Silver Leaf Jazz Band, Jacques Gauthes' Creole Rice Jazz Band, Eddie Bayard's Steamboat Stompers on the steamboat "Natchez", Barry Wratten's Pelican Jazz Band, The Original Camellia Jazz Band, The Crescent City Rhythm Kings, and Tim Laughlin's Jazz Band. He was unable to tour with Redbone during this time since he would have risked losing his position working at the local venues in New Orleans. Roberts commented that he would regularly play piano for more than ten hours each day.

=== Annapolis ===
In 1994, Roberts relocated to Annapolis, Maryland. He lived there for five years and once again toured with Leon Redbone. During his stay there, Roberts released his first solo album, Night Cap, in 1999.

=== New York City ===
In late 1999, Roberts relocated to New York City. In 2003, he performed twice at New York's Carnegie Hall, once with Skitch Henderson and again with The New York Pops. Also in 2003, he was featured both as a solo artist and also with Dick Hyman at the Jazz In July series at New York's 92nd St. Y. He lived in New York through 2006.

While there, he also arranged and performed at Lincoln Center under Phil Schapp in a concert showing the evolution of the big band.

Roberts became the pianist for Vince Giordano and The Nighthawks and was on several albums they released during that time period. He was the pianist for The Nighthawks until they took a temporary hiatus in 2006. While living in New York, Roberts also continued to serve as the pianist and musical director for Leon Redbone.

=== Return to Pittsburgh ===
Upon returning to Pittsburgh in 2006, Roberts continued to tour worldwide with bands from New Orleans and New York such as Leon Redbone, the Original Dixieland Jazzband, and the Louisiana Repertory Jazz Ensemble.

In April 2006, Roberts premiered his extended composition "The Poetry of Jazz" in Pittsburgh. It was written in tandem with Joe Negri, setting the poems of Langston Hughes to original jazz compositions written in the styles from the twenties through modern day.

Roberts formed the Allegheny City Ragtime Orchestra in order to share lost ragtime music, especially music written by local Pittsburgh composers, with a contemporary audience. Roberts is a music historian with a special focus on the early jazz era and Pittsburgh jazz musicians. He has been a frequent guest on National Public Radio and has published a number of articles in the magazine Piano Today. In order to share some of his knowledge, he started the Hot Club of Pittsburgh where he shares his extensive knowledge of jazz. Pittsburgh's City of Asylum has featured Roberts's Hot Club presentations. Roberts continues to give these presentations to groups around the country.

Roberts collaborated with Rick Sebak to provide music for his Pittsburgh-based documentaries Nebby: Rick Sebak's Tales of Greater Pittsburgh.

Roberts and his band, the Red Beans and Rice Combo including Dave Klug (artist, illustrator, and musician) and Wayne "Wayno" Honath (the current cartoonist of the Bizarro (comic strip)), was featured in Rick Sebak's 2020 holiday special, Happy Holidays In Pittsburgh.

== Additional arrangements and performances ==
On September 19, 1998, Roberts performed on Garrison Keillor's A Prairie Home Companion with Leon Redbone. He also performed with Redbone on The Statler Brothers Show on TNN In 2006, Roberts wrote a number of arrangements for Wynton Marsalis and the Jazz at Lincoln Center Orchestra for a concert featuring the music of Louis Armstrong that took place that October. He also arranged music for the syndicated Public Radio International show Riverwalk Jazz, and for Live From the Landing with the Jim Cullum Jazz Band. In 2008, Roberts was commissioned to write arrangements of Oscar Levant's Blame It On My Youth and a medley of Earl Hines compositions for The Pittsburgh Concert Chorale to celebrate the 250th anniversary of the founding of Pittsburgh.

Roberts earned international recognition as an expert in the stride piano style and has performed throughout the United States and Europe. In both 2001 and 2009, he was the featured pianist at the International Stride Piano Summit in Zurich, Switzerland.

In our humble opinion, Tom Roberts is without question one of the finest pianists today in the exciting Harlem stride piano style...

— JazzBeat Magazine

Tom Roberts has recorded over 40 albums including Any Time with Leon Redbone, Streets and Scenes of New Orleans with the Silver Leaf Jazz Band, Night Cap, Roberts Plays Roberts, The Lion's Den, and Charlie Caranicas & Tom Roberts - Move Over.

== Film ==
=== Film arrangements and performances ===
Martin Scorsese heard Roberts perform with The Nighthawks and asked him to arrange and perform music for the soundtrack for his film The Aviator, starring Leonardo DiCaprio. Most of the scenes with "live" music feature Roberts as the pianist, however, he doesn't appear on screen. Roberts later wrote several pieces for the period film De-Lovely.

=== Silent film scores ===
In 2012, Roberts was contacted by the Andy Warhol Museum in Pittsburgh to perform live accompaniment for a series of silent films they planned to screen. Initially, Roberts turned down the offer explaining that when those films were first released, only very small venues used improvisational pianists to accompany films. All larger venues employed orchestras to accompany films. The orchestras did not improvise and instead played from score sheets the film company recommended for each movie scene. Roberts suggested that the museum have entirely new scores written to accompany the films. The museum agreed to his suggestion and asked Roberts to write scores for the events, the first of which took place in 2012.

Roberts went on to compose scores for various silent movie events worldwide. His score for One A.M. debuted at the Leopold Mozart Conservatory in Augsburg, Germany in 2013. Roberts has written and performed multiple scores to accompany silent films by Charlie Chaplin, Buster Keaton, Alfred Hitchcock, and F. W. Murnau.

Roberts composed a score for the first annual National Silent Movie Day on September 29, 2021, for the silent film version of Hitchcock's Blackmail. Chad Hunter, of Video Trust and the Pittsburgh Silent Film Society, initially conceived of the national event with film archivists Brandee B. Cox, of the Academy of Motion Picture Arts and Sciences Film Archive, and Steven K. Hill, of the UCLA Film and Television Archive. Martin Scorsese promoted the event and drew national attention to it.

In 2022, Roberts wrote an original score for the 100th anniversary of the film Nosferatu by F. W. Murnau which he debuted in February 2022 at the Harris Theater in Pittsburgh for two sold-out performances.

== Discography ==
- The Aviator Music From the Motion Picture (Sony Music, 2004)
- Rebecca Kilgore with Hal Smith's California Swing Cats (Audiophile, 2015)
- The Lion's Den (Stomp Off Records, 2003)
- Charlie Caranicas & Tom Roberts - Move Over (Black Knight Records, 2007)
- Barbara Rosene And Her New Yorkers – It Was Only A Sun Shower (Stomp Off, 2007)
- Barbara Rosene – All My Life (Azica, 2005)
- Stride Summit (Harlem Piano Highlights) (2004)
- Dan Levinson's Roof Garden Jass Band – Echoes In The Wax (Stomp Off Records, 2003)
- Any Time (Rounder, 2001)
- Dan Levinson's Roof Garden Jass Band – Blue Roses Of Far And Near (Stomp Off Records, 2000)
- "Pam" Pameijer's New Jazz Wizards – The Music Of Louis Armstrong: Hot 5 & 7 Vol.1 (Stomp Off Records, 2000)
- Roberts Plays Roberts (Stomp Off Records, 1999)
- Mike Owen and his Woodland Jazz Band Without You For an Inspiration Mr. Ory ( G.H.B., 1998)
- New Orleans Jazz Party (ZYX Records, 1998)
- Dan Levinson's Roof Garden Jass Band – Salutes The ODJB And The Beginning Of Recorded Jazz (Loup-Garous Productions, 1998)
- Night Cap (Solo Art, 1997)
- Stealin' Apples by California Swing Cats (Jazzology Records, 1996)
- Jelly's Best Jam (Good Time Jazz, 1993)
- Streets and Scenes of New Orleans with the Silver Leaf Jazz Band (Good Time Jazz, 1993)

== Silent movie film scores ==
- Nosferatu: 100th Anniversary presentation for The Pittsburgh Silent Film Society - New composition in 2022 for the first annual Silent Film Day
- Blackmail by Alfred Hitchcock - New Composition in 2021
- Charlie Chaplin Centennial Celebration 2012 to present
- The Monkey Talks (1913) - New Composition in 2013
- Kid Auto Races (1914) - New composition in 2019
- The Pawn Shop (1916) - New composition in 2015
- One A.M. (1916) - New composition in 2012
- The Rink (1916) - New composition in 2012
- Stage Struck (1925) starring Gloria Swanson - New composition for The Andy Warhol Museum (2012)
- Tramp, Tramp, Tramp (1926) starring Harry Langdon - New composition for the Andy Warhol Museum (2014)
- Special Delivery (1927) starring Eddie Cantor - New composition
