= Trevor Richards (musician) =

English jazz drummer (born 1945)

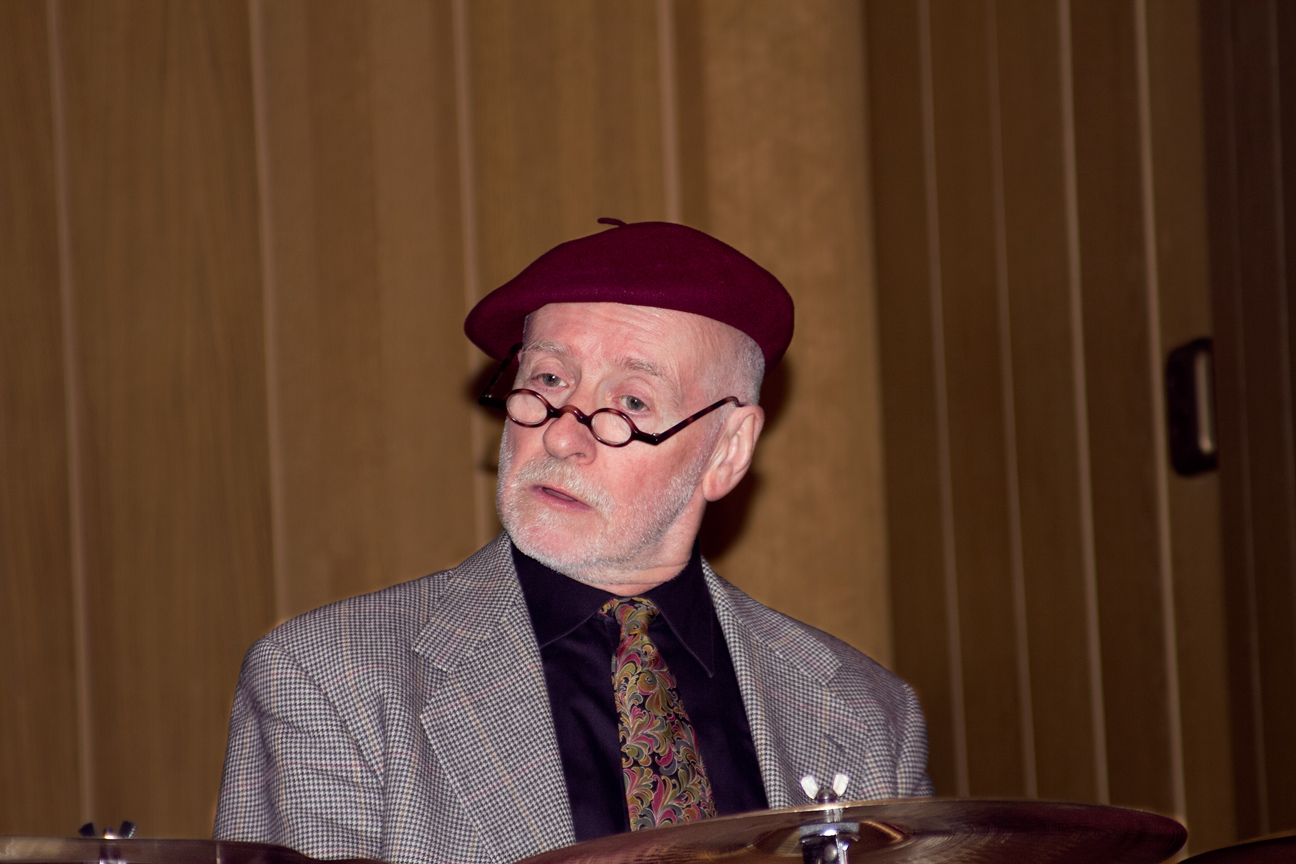
Trevor Richards

Trevor Hamilton Edward Richards (born 29 August 1945) is an English jazz drummer.

Richards was born in Bexhill-on-Sea. He played in Germany from 1963 to 1966, then went to New York City, where he studied briefly with Zutty Singleton. He went to New Orleans and played in jazz clubs until 1968, when he returned to England. Later that year, he drummed for the Olympia Brass Band on a European tour. He would spend much of the 1970s touring Europe, playing with Louis Nelson, Alton Purnell, Freddie Kohlman, Albert Nicholas, and Benny Waters. In the 1980s he worked extensively with Art Hodes as well as with Ralph Sutton and Jacques Gauthé. He returned to New Orleans in 1982 and played with Clive Wilson; Richards eventually led Wilson's ensemble for recordings and a tour of Asia. He has recorded for the labels Stomp Off and L+R among others.
