= Ernie Carson =

American jazz musician

Ernie Carson (December 4, 1937 – January 9, 2012) was an American Dixieland jazz revival cornetist, pianist, and singer. He was born in Portland, Oregon.

Carson played trumpet from elementary school and at Lincoln High School in Portland, Oregon. He was introduced to Dixieland music by listening to Monte Ballou's Castle Jazz Band through the bathroom wall at the Liberty Theater in Portland as a teenager. He ended up playing with the Castle Jazz Band in the mid-1950s prior to a stint in the U.S. Marines. Following this he worked in Los Angeles with Dave Wierbach, Jig Adams, Ray Bauduc, Pat Yankee, and Turk Murphy, and led several of his own groups from the 1970s, including the Capital City Jazz Band and a new version of the Castle Jazz Band. After more than twenty years of playing based in Atlanta, he moved back to Oregon in 1995. He died in 2012 in Portland, Oregon.

== Discography ==
=== As leader ===
- Ernie Carson and His Capital City Jazz Band (Jazzology, 1968)
- Ole Oregon Ern (Fat Cat, 1973)
- Pretty Little Lady from Beaumont, Texas (1975)
- At the Hooker's Ball (GHB, 1980)
- Pink Elephants (GHB, 1992)
- Southern Comfort (GHB, 1993)
- Christmas at the Castle (1993)
- Wher'm I Gonna Live? (Stomp Off, 1994)
- Every Man a King (GHB, 1995)
- Old Bones (Stomp Off, 1995)
- One Beer (GHB, 1995)
- If I Had a Talking Picture (1998)

=== As sideman ===
- Live at Earthquake McGoon's with Turk Murphy (RCA, 1961)
- Nonte Ballou and his New Castle Jazz Band (GHB 1968)
- "Jazz On a Saturday Afternoon - Volume One and Two" with Wild Bill Davison (Jazzology Records 1970)
- "Barrelhousin' with Joe" with Joe Darensbourg (GHB 1972)
- "Echoes og Chicago" with Art Hodes and his Windy City Seven (Jazzology Records 1978)
- "We Just Couldn't Say Goodbye" with Maxine Sullivan (Jazzology Records 1978)
- On the Goldenrod Showboat, The Original Salty Dog Jazz Band (1982)
- "World of Jelly Roll Morton" with Bob Greene (GHB 1982)
- "Go Back Where You Stayed Last Night" with Carol Leigh (GHB 1996)
- "You've Got To Give Me Some" with Carol Leigh (GHB 1996)
- "St. Peter Street Strutters" with Bob Greene (Delmark Records 2009 - recorded in 1964)
