= Jazz Hall of Fame =

Jazz Hall of Fame may refer to:

- Alabama Jazz Hall of Fame, an organization based in Birmingham, Alabama
- Oklahoma Jazz Hall of Fame, an organization based in Tulsa, Oklahoma
- Big Band and Jazz Hall of Fame (1978–2004), a defunct annual recognition in San Diego County, California
- DownBeat Jazz Hall of Fame, sponsored by DownBeat magazine since 1952
- Nesuhi Ertegun Jazz Hall of Fame, sponsored by Jazz at Lincoln Center
