= Donald Ashwander =

American composer

Donald Ashwander (1929–1994) was an American composer in the contemporary ragtime movement. Much of his printed music was not available to the general public until 1996, two years after his death.

Ashwander was best known to the general public as the musical director for the Paper Bag Players, a New York children's theater group (founded by Judith Martin in 1958) from 1966 to Ashwander's death in 1994.

== Early life and education ==
Ashwander was born in 1929 in Birmingham, Alabama, but grew up on a farm near Hanceville. He took piano lessons in high school, followed by more serious study at Sacred Heart College in Cullman, Alabama, and Birmingham Southern College. From 1948 to 1951, he studied at the Manhattan School of Music. In the undergraduate program curriculum, his major field of study was piano. Other courses included psychology, English, history, theory, ensemble, chorus, sight singing, keyboard harmony, and dictation. He studied piano with Darrell Peter, dictation with Ruth Van Doren, and theory with Ludmila Ulehla. There is a possibility that he may have studied composition privately with Ben Weber (a former President of the American Composers Alliance). He was not interested in the experimental nature of most contemporary music of the time, nor in commercial music. He did, however, become a master of notation and a superb copyist, often charging handsome fees from other composers. He moved back to Mobile, Alabama, where he worked in the shipyards, the merchant marine, and played piano in bars and cocktail lounges. In the 1960s, he returned to New York, where, in 1966, he became musical director for the Paper Bag Players, where he played electric harpsichord, sang, and also acted .

== Career as pianist and composer ==
After reading the first history of ragtime, "They All Played Ragtime," Ashwander contacted one of its authors, Rudi Blesh, and from this developed a long friendship. Blesh facilitated Ashwander's first solo piano ragtime recording, Donald Ashwander – Ragtime: A New View. In 1989, Ashwander recorded an album, "On The Highwire," which was not released in his lifetime. In 1998, his friend, Matthew de Lacey Davidson, partially re-recorded a new version of that album for Capstone Records, which was released in 2000.

== Incomplete discography ==
- 2012: Donald Ashwander: Sunshine and Shadow, New World Records 80724 – Anthology recording of an unreleased CD from 1989, and two previously released LP recordings
- 2000: On The Highwire: Piano Rags, Waltzes, and Tangos by Donald Ashwander – Matthew de Lacey Davidson, piano Capstone Records CPS-8680 – a re-recording of Ashwander's initially unreleased CD from 1989
- 1994: Traditional Patterns: The Music of Donald Ashwander Premier Recordings, PRCD 1038
- 1971: Donald Ashwander – Ragtime: A New View Jazzology JCE-71, Long Playing Vinyl Record
