= Duke (magazine) =

American men's magazine

- Editor: Dan Burley
- Categories: Men's magazines
- Frequency: Monthly
- Publisher: Duke Publishing Co.
- Founded: 1957
- Country: United States
- Based in: Chicago, Illinois
- Language: English

Duke was a short-lived men's magazine formed by ex-employees of the Johnson Publishing Company. It is notable as an early attempt at an upscale adult periodical for African-American audiences.
It was primarily a black and white publication, although the cover and centerfold were color printed.

Like many of its contemporaries, the magazine was heavily inspired by the runaway success of Playboy magazine, although it featured no outright nudity and remained very tame all around. It was based in Chicago, both Playboy's hometown and a hub for African-American intellectuals of that era.

The magazine's centerfold models were called Duchess of the Month. The first Duchess was Eleanor Crews, who had earlier appeared as the October girl in the 1957 pin-up calendar included with the New Year issue of Jet.

The magazine's publisher and main author was Benjamin Burns, who had previously worked on a men's magazine named Modern Man and been prosecuted for obscenity on that occasion. While Modern Man was not an ethnic publication, and Burns was a white Jew, he was well acquainted with the black press, having held high ranking positions at the Chicago Defender, Ebony and its sister publication Jet.

The editor and face of the magazine was journalist and musician Dan Burley, although it has been argued that he was largely a figurehead hired to lend black credibility to the magazine, while Burns (who did not appear on the masthead) was the main man.

The magazine lasted just 6 issues. It is unrelated to the later Duke that was published between 1967 and 1978, and primarily featured Caucasian models.

== See also ==
- Players, a more commercially successful erotic magazine for African-American men.
