= Black Swan Records =

American jazz and blues record label

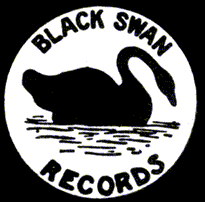
- Parent company: Jazzology
- Founded: 1921
- Founder: Harry Pace
- Defunct: 1924
- Distributor: George H. Buck Jr. Jazz Foundation
- Genre: Jazz, blues
- Country of origin: U.S.
- Location: New Orleans, Louisiana
- Official website: www.jazzology.com

Black Swan Records was an American jazz and blues record label founded in 1921 in Harlem, New York. It was the first widely distributed label to be owned, operated, and marketed to African Americans. Founded by Harry Pace with W.C. Handy, Black Swan Records was established to give African Americans more creative liberties. (Note: Eighteen months earlier, in 1919, the Broome Special Phonograph Records was the earliest label owned and operated by African American George W. Broome in Medford, Massachusetts, featuring Black classical musicians including Harry T. Burleigh and Edward Boatner.) Black Swan was revived in the 1990s for CD reissues of its historic jazz and blues recordings.

== History ==
Black Swan's parent company, Pace Phonograph Corporation, was founded in March 1921 by Harry Pace and was based in Harlem. The new production company was formed after Pace's music publishing partnership with W. C. Handy, Pace & Handy, had dissolved. Black Swan, which sought to specialize in classical recordings, served as an investment opportunity for the Talented Tenth. As recognized by Thomas Brothers, "luminaries like Jack Nail and James Weldon Johnson served on the Black Swan board of directors", and The Crisis, the journal then edited by W.E.B. Du Bois, and published by the NAACP, invested its profits in the company.

Bert Williams was an early investor in Pace Phonograph. Williams also promised to record for the company once his exclusive contract with Columbia Records ended, but he died before that could occur.

Pace Phonograph Corporation was renamed Black Swan Phonograph Company in the fall of 1922. Both the record label and production company were named after 19th century opera star Elizabeth Greenfield, who was known as the Black Swan.

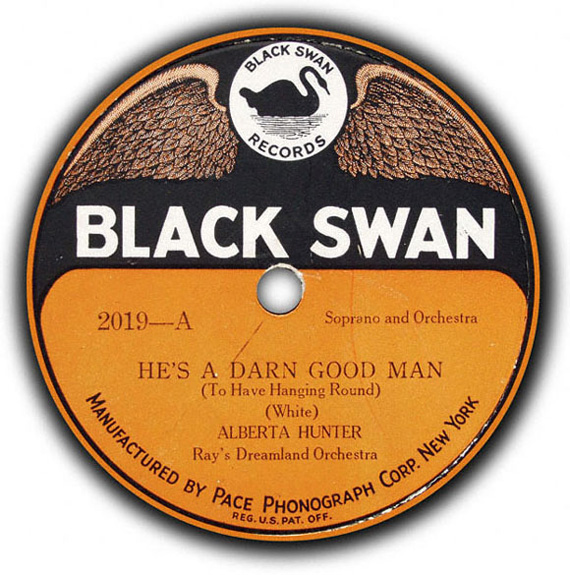
1921 record by Alberta Hunter

Former employees of Pace & Handy staffed the new company: Fletcher Henderson, who functioned as the recording manager, provided piano accompaniment for singers and led a small band for recording sessions. William Grant Still was named arranger and later musical director. Ads for Black Swan often ran in The Crisis.

Black Swan proved moderately successful. It recorded African American musicians, but as the label grew in popularity, Pace believed competing white-owned labels such as Columbia Records sought to "obstruct the progress and curtail the popularity of Black Swan Records". Although advertising for Black Swan Records claimed all its musicians and employees were African American, it sometimes used white musicians to back some of its singers.

The production company declared bankruptcy in December 1923, and in March 1924 Paramount Records bought the Black Swan label. The Chicago Defender reported the event by detailing important accomplishments of Black Swan in a short career span, including: pointed out—to the major, all white-owned, record companies—the significant market demand for black artists; prompted several major companies to begin publishing music by these performers. In addition, the Defender credited Pace with showing the majors how to target black audiences and to advertise in black newspapers. Paramount discontinued the Black Swan label a short time later.

The Black Swan label was revived in the 1990s for a series of CD reissues of historic jazz and blues recordings originally issued on Black Swan and Paramount. These CDs were issued by George H. Buck Jr's Jazzology and GHB labels under the control of the George H. Buck Jr. Jazz Foundation, which gained rights to the Paramount back-catalogue but not the Paramount name. Rights to the name "Black Swan Records" were also transferred to GHB.

== Artists ==
- Bessie Allison, original member of the Shuffle Along cast
- C. Carroll Clark, baritone who was the first artist recorded by the label
- Four Harmony Kings, vocal quartet
- Henry Creamer and J. Turner Layton, vaudeville duo
- Katie Crippen, vaudeville singer
- Kemper Harreld, violinist
- Lucille Hegamin, jazz and blues singer
- Revella Hughes, soprano featured on one of the label's first releases
- Alberta Hunter, blues singer
- James P. Johnson, jazz pianist
- Nettie Moore was a singer who recorded "Deep River" (1922) /"Song of India" (1922) and "Christmas Chimes" with Ethel Waters on Black Swan.
- Hattie King Reavis, soprano singer
- Trixie Smith, blues singer, second only to Ethel Waters in Black Swan sales.
- Florence Cole Talbert, first classical artist to record with Black Swan, soprano, music educator
- "Mamie Jones", pseudonym for singer Aileen Stanley who was one of many white artists to record for Black Swan. These artists were "passing for colored" since the label was advertised as featuring only black artists.
- Eva Taylor, blues singer
- Ethel Waters, jazz, gospel, blues singer. She had the label's first commercially successful records, and remained their best seller.
- Essie Whitman, vaudeville singer

== See also ==
- List of record labels

== Bibliography ==
=== References ===
- Brooks, Tim (2004). Lost Sounds: Blacks and the Birth of the Recording Industry, 1890–1919. Urbana: University of Illinois Press. p. 168. ISBN 0-252-02850-3 – via Internet Archive (ARChive of Contemporary Music).
- Crisis (The) (July 1921). "Black Swan Records – July Releases". The Crisis (advertisement). Vol. 24, no. 3, whole no. 141. New York. p. 139. ISSN 0011-1422 – via Google Books (Harvard).
- Crisis (The); Pace, Harry Herbert (1884–1943) (November 1922). "To the Investing Public". The Crisis (advertisement). Vol. 25, no. 1, whole no. 145. New York. p. 44. ISSN 0011-1422 – via Google Books.
- Brothers, Thomas David, PhD (2014). Louis Armstrong: Master of Modernism. W.W. Norton & Company. pp. 127–129 – via Internet Archive. LCCN 2013-37726; ISBN 978-0-3930-6582-4; OCLC 858940268 (all editions).
- Dallas Express (The). "Black Swan Company to Sue Columbia Record Company – Pace Company Alleges That New Singer Under Contract Is Being Featured by Columbia Company as Its Exclusive Artist, Will Sue". Vol. 41, no. 18. p. 1 (cols. 6–7, top).
1. Access option 1 (PDF) – via Fultonhistory.com.
2. Access option 2 – via The Portal to Texas History.
3. Access option 3 – via Newspapers.com.
- Gibbs, Craig Martin (December 18, 2012). Black Recording Artists, 1877–1926: An Annotated Discography. McFarland & Company, Inc. p. 105 – via Google Books (limited preview). LCCN 2012-44588; ISBN 978-1-4766-0085-7; OCLC 818293616 (all editions).
- Settlemier, Tyrone (November 30, 2006). "Black Swan Miscellaneous Series". The Online Discographical Project (discography).
- Settlemier, Tyrone (September 19, 2008). "Black Swan 2000 Series Numerical Listing". The Online Discographical Project (discography).
- Smith, Jessie Carney, ed. (1996) [1992]. Notable Black American Women (re: Florence Cole-Talbert). Vol. 2 (of 3). Detroit: Gale Research. LCCN 91-35074; ISBN 0-8103-9177-5 (Vol. 2); OCLC 24468213 (all editions).
1. Via Internet Archive.
2. Via Google Books (limited preview).
- Southern, Eileen (1997) [1971]. The Music of Black Americans: A History (3rd ed.). New York: W. W. Norton & Company. LCCN 96-28811; ISBN 0-393-97141-4; OCLC 125122 (all editions).
1. 1st ed.. 1971 – via Internet Archive. LCCN 77-98891; ISBN 0-3930-2156-4.
2. Southern, Eileen; Southerland, William M. (1983). 2nd ed.. ISBN 9780393952797 – via Internet Archive (ARChive of Contemporary Music). LCCN 82-25960; ISBN 0-3939-5279-7.
- Suisman, David (2004). "Co-Workers in the Kingdom of Culture: Black Swan Records and the Political Economy of African American Music". The Journal of American History. 90 (4): 1295–1324. doi:10.2307/3660349. JSTOR 3660349. OCLC 5322045005.
- Sutton, Allan; Nauck, Kurt (2000). American Record Labels and Companies – An Encyclopedia (1891–1943) (1st ed.). Denver: Mainspring Press. p. 417. ISBN 0-9671819-0-9.
- Sutton, Allan (August 29, 2007). "Black Swan's Other Stars". Mainspring Press. Archived from the original on May 9, 2008 – via Wayback Machine.
- Thygesen, Helge; Berresford, Mark; Shor, Russ (1996). Black Swan: The Record Label of the Harlem Renaissance – A History and Catalogue Listing Including Olympic Records and Associated Labels. Nottingham: VJM Publications – via Internet Archive (ARChive of Contemporary Music). LCCN 2001-537708; OCLC 36338791 (all editions).
- Weusi, Jitu K. (né Leslie R. Campbell; 1939–2013) (1996). "The Rise and Fall of Black Swan Records". A History of Jazz Before 1930 (Spring 1996 term paper for a graduate course in music "Black Music in New York City 1900–1935", Brooklyn College; unpublished). The Red Hot Jazz Archive. Archived from the original on April 27, 2016 – via Wayback Machine.
- "White Performers on Black Swan" (discography). Mainspring Press (blog). 2005. Archived from the original on September 24, 2010.
