= Dan Burley =

American pianist and journalist

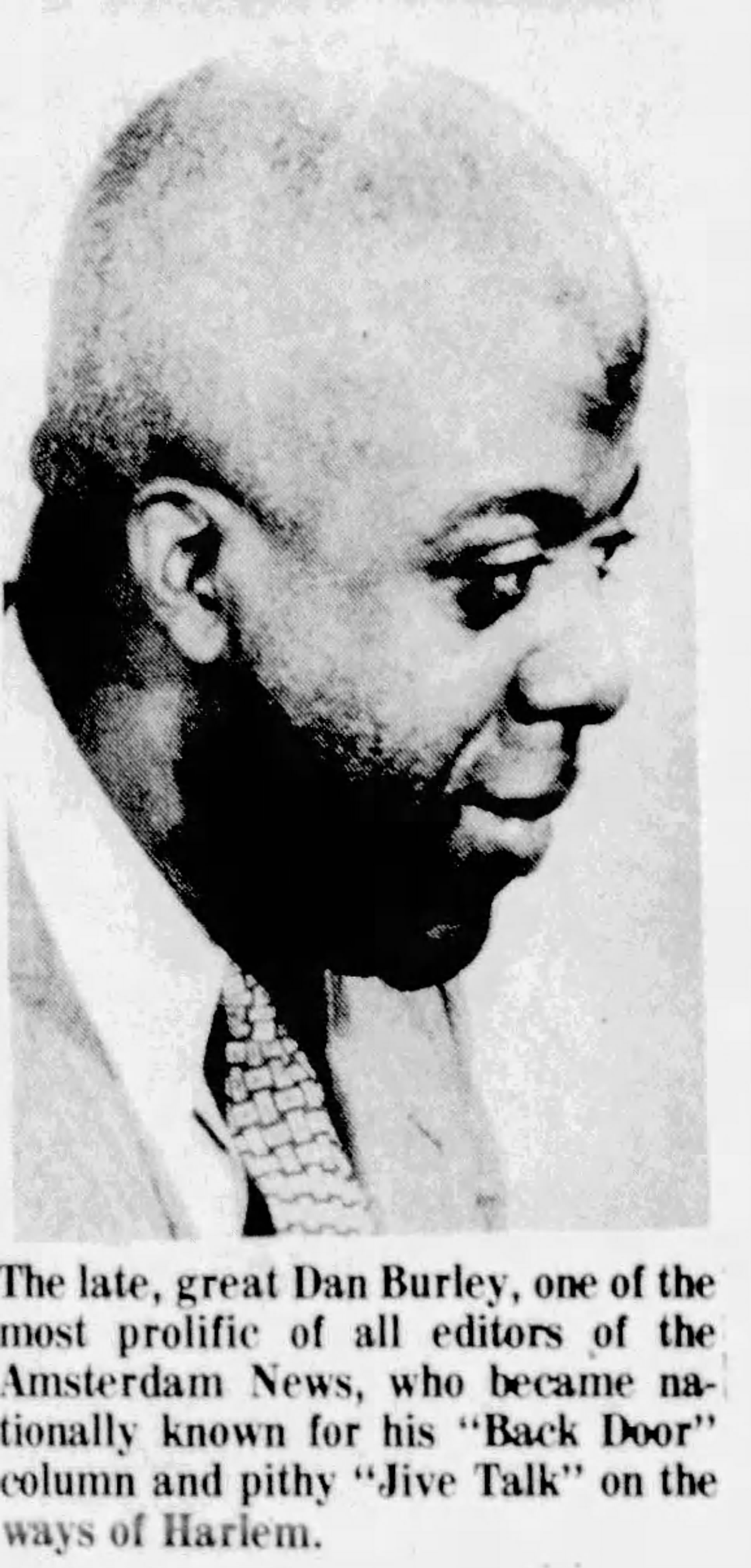
Photo of Burley in the New York Amsterdam News

Daniel Gardner Burley (November 7, 1907, in Lexington, Kentucky – October 29, 1962, in Chicago, Illinois) was an American pianist and journalist. He appeared on numerous network television and radio shows in the US and had two radio shows of his own on WWRL Radio in New York.

He was editor of many African-American publications, including the New York Age, the Amsterdam News, and the magazines Ebony, Jet and Duke. He also appeared in five films, performed with Duke Ellington, Cab Calloway, Milton Hinton, Lionel Hampton, Leonard Feather, Fats Waller, Billie Holiday, Ella Fitzgerald and Louis Armstrong, and wrote music for Lionel Hampton and Cab Calloway.

== Early life ==
Dan's father, Rev. James Burley, an Evangelist Baptist minister, died while preaching at Mt. Gilead Baptist Church in Texas when Dan was three years old. His mother, Anna Seymour, an educator, (born in Georgia), remarried and in 1915 moved to Chicago and became involved with politics on the Southside within the Republican Party of Ruth Hanna McCormick, Charles Dineen and William "Big Bill" Thompson. His mother taught under Booker T. Washington at Tuskegee University and was the first African American woman to teach at a school then called "Armour Tech", later the Illinois Institute of Technology.

Burley attended Wendell Phillips High and was president of the school paper and on the High School football league. He also played basketball, fulfilled his love of writing, worked as a paper carrier for the Chicago Daily Defender as a teenager and played boogie-woogie piano. While attending Phillips, Burley developed friendships with Lionel Hampton, Milton Hinton, Louis Jordan, and Langley Waller, who later all moved from Chicago to New York City to work in the music, writing and entertainment industries.

== Journalism ==
By 1929 Burley was the sports editor for the Daily Defender with a featured column syndicated throughout the country. He also wrote for the Chicago Bee, owned by S.B. Fuller who also owned the Pittsburgh Courier, in which Burley had a syndicated column, and who co-owned The New York Age with Burley after he moved to New York.

After moving to New York City Burley became theatrical editor of the Amsterdam News. From 1936 to 1937 he worked as a writer on the paper; three years later he became the managing editor, a position which he held for over twelve years. He became the managing editor of the New York Age, which he co-owned with S. B. Fuller. He was an editor of Ebony magazine from the late 1930s. While in New York, Burley married his first wife, Gustava McCurdy, the first black woman to sing the national anthem at Madison Square Garden. Gustava, at the age of 35, developed cancer and died.

Burley reputedly coined the word bebop and was the creator of The Harlem Handbook of Jive, which sold more than 100,000 copies. It was published in 1941 and reprinted in 1944. Burley's handbook brought mentions from H. L. Mencken, Gertrude Stein, Danton Walker, Winchell and others. The Handbook of Jive was translated into French, Italian, Spanish and Norwegian.

During World War II he served as a war correspondent and led a Special Service USO Unit in China, Burma, North Africa, Egypt and India. Composed of Henry Armstrong, Kenny Washington, Jow Lillard, and Bill Yancy it was rated No. 2 (behind the Bob Hope show) by Variety Magazine.

From 1947 Burley was writer for Elijah Muhammad, published as Mohammad Speaks, so helping establish press exposure for the Black Nation of Islam. The foreword of the publication Message to the Black Man was written by Burley, who got involved through S. B. Fuller, the only owner who would accept the articles, in the Pittsburg Courier.

Fuller entrusted Burley with editing the work, knowing the controversy of the material. He edited Mohammad Speaks until his death in 1962. He himself was not a Muslim nor a member of the Nation at any time but was friends with Malcolm X, who had columns in several publications under different names, as did Burley. Later Malcolm X contacted Burley's former classmate Langley Waller in New York City as a printer of journals and papers in New York. Mr. Waller had a press he was willing to sell to Malcolm, but instead Lerner of Chicago printed the paper.

Burley returned to Chicago with his second wife Gladys. Their only child was D'Anne Elizabeth Burley. Her father had taken the prototype magazine Jet to Johnson Publications in Chicago. After a dispute Johnson took on the magazine and made Burley managing editor of Jet and associate editor of Ebony Magazine from 1951 until his son Robert succeeded him. The columnist Walter Winchell became a good friend of Burley's along with Dorothy Killgallen, Ed Sullivan, Bill Corum, Hy Gardner, Earl Wilson. Burley contributed his works to Esquire Magazine, The Saturday Evening Post, Pic, Crisis, Interracial Review and The Catholic Press.

He began to add publications to his syndicated arena: Tan, Life, Look and Sepia among them. Gladys helped with editorial work and management out of their apartment in Lake Meadows, a complex into which the Burleys were among the first families to move: Burley sat on the board, partly because his mother had owned a property at 31st Street/King Drive which was used for the development. He managed and edited The New Crusader with Mr. Lavalle, and wrote syndicated columns in both black and white publications.

== Music career ==
Burley started his music career by playing Chicago "house rent parties", blues cafes, socials, and clubs. His barrelhouse playing has been said to have influenced Humphrey Lyttelton's "Bad Penny Blues" and hence the Beatles's song "Lady Madonna". His group Dan Burley & His Skiffle Boys, founded in 1946, may have given rise to the 1950s British music genre name skiffle.

Burley recorded with Leonard Feather and Tiny Grimes in 1945, and with Lionel Hampton in 1946. That same year, he put together Dan Burley & His Skiffle Boys, an ensemble that included Brownie McGhee and his brother Sticks, as well as Pops Foster. During the course of his career, Burley also recorded with Hot Lips Page, Tyree Glenn, and Baby Dodds.

During his career, Burley composed more than twenty original musical compositions, with colorful names, such as, "Pig Foot Sonata," and "The Chicken Shack Shuffle."
