= They All Played Ragtime =

1950 book by journalist Rudi Blesh

- Author: Rudi Blesh and Harriet Janis
- Language: English
- Subject: Music - Ragtime
- Published: 1950
- Publication place: United States
- ISBN: 978-0825600913

They All Played Ragtime is a non-fiction book by journalist Rudi Blesh and author Harriet Janis, originally published by Grove Press in 1950. It was subsequently reissued in 1959, 1966, and 1971 by Oak Publications, and in 2007 by Nelson Press. According to the Preface to the Fourth Edition, by Rudi Blesh, the book was conceived and researched largely by Harriet Janis, who died in 1963. It is generally recognized as the pioneering and first serious book to document the history and major composers of ragtime in America, and has been referred to as The Bible of Ragtime.

== Summary ==
The book is divided into a prelude and thirteen chapters. It is the first book to document what is now regarded as the early ragtime triumvirate: Scott Joplin, James Scott, and Joseph Lamb. In a recorded discussion between Rudi Blesh and pianist Milton Kaye, Blesh revealed that for a long time the authors were not able to find out any information about Joseph Lamb, and that some believed the name to be a pseudonym for Scott Joplin. Eventually, Janis and Blesh located Lamb living in Brooklyn. Lamb described his meeting Scott Joplin to Blesh and Janis (following Joplin's move from the Midwest to New York City). Blesh states how Lamb was initially unaware of the quality of his music and asked Blesh how much it would cost him to get into Blesh and Janis’ book. In the 1966 Oak Publications edition, Blesh wrote a new acknowledgements section for the third edition. In it, he states how that edition includes sixteen complete ragtime piano scores, and that Donald Ashwander was the copyist for most of them. In addition to a new rag by Joseph Lamb, the scores included more recent ragtime compositions by Ashwander, Max Morath, Bob Darch, and Peter Lundberg.

== Reception ==
Some historians regard They All Played Ragtime as the major impetus for the modern, post-1950 ragtime revival. Some historians, however, have noted that Blesh and Janis’ skills were more as journalists rather than historians, which was more acceptable in 1960 than in the 21st century. This resulted in a number of inaccuracies in their research.
