= World Broadcasting System =

American radio program distributor

World Broadcasting System, Inc., was an American recording service for the radio industry founded in 1929 by Percy L. Deutsch (1885–1968), with key investors and creative artists (Walter) Gustave Haenschen and Milton Diamond (both of whom had worked with Deutsch at the Brunswick Record Company) and was originally based in New York. The company recorded and, through its subsidiary, World Program Service, distributed discs to radio stations for broadcast. The discs themselves were 16 inches (410 mm) in diameter, vertical-cut, recorded at 33 1/3 revolutions per minute, and would play for 15 minutes per side on average. These recordings, which were made especially for radio studios that could not afford to maintain a studio orchestra, were not sold to the public.

In 1932, WBS built studios in Washington, D.C., for use by "members of Congress and other public officials" for distribution to their home radio stations. An article in Broadcasting magazine reported that the facilities would be made available at no charge except for a nominal fee to cover the cost of discs. The facilities were formally opened June 7, 1932.

Additional expansion occurred late in 1932, when WBS opened a production studio in Chicago, in a building that housed the Chicago Daily News and WMAQ radio. A Hollywood studio began producing discs for WBS in 1933. The first was Tarzan of the Apes, which was done for Signal Oil Company and Fould's Milling Company. Also, in March 1933, the company's Chicago facility began producing transcriptions of The Air Adventures of Jimmie Allen for Skelly Oil Company.

The company expanded its operations on an international scale in 1934, forming World Broadcasting System of Australasia, Ltd., as a subsidiary. An announcement at the time said that the subsidiary would promote the use of the World Program Service in Australia and New Zealand, with station 2GB in Sydney, Australia, as the first subscriber.

In 1948, an advertisement in a trade publication said, "over 640 stations now use this great world library."

== Ownership ==
In 1943, Decca Records bought WBS from Deutsch for $750,000 — a bargain price during the musicians strike.

Frederick W. Ziv, Co. acquired World Broadcasting System, Inc., for $1.5 million on August 4, 1948, but later sold it to a Philadelphia firm, which in turn sold it to Commercial Recording Corporation, a Dallas-based corporation founded in 1955 by Tom Merriman.

In 1971, CRC sold World Broadcasting Systems to George H. Buck, Jr. (1928-2013) — a jazz enthusiast who founded Jazzology Records.

== Innovations ==
In 1932, WBS announced the use of its Washington studios for producing Visaphone disks for the Fairchild-Wood Visaphone Corp. The 12-inch, 33 1/3 rpm disks were used to record lectures that were synchronized with still pictures on film that was shown through projectors. The system was described in a trade publication as "an improvement on Stereopticon slides used for lecture purposes."

== Historic recording artists ==
The collection includes recordings of Woody Herman, Benny Goodman, Duke Ellington, Harry James, Xavier Cugat, The Dorsey Brothers, Casa Loma Orchestra, Lawrence Welk, Lionel Hampton, Peggy Lee, Mildred Bailey, Helen Forrest, Monica Lewis, Ernest Tubb, Charlie Applewhite, Red Foley, and Mel Torme; and also, at least originally, Billy Taylor, Milt Herth, Bing Crosby with the Harry James Orchestra, Freddie Fisher, Wild Bill Davison, Mantovani, Stuff Smith, and Tiny Hill, among others.

== Other transcription services ==
- Langlois & Wentworth, Inc.
- RCA Thesaurus
