= Natty Dominique =

American jazz trumpeter

- Birth name: Anatie Dominique
- Born: August 2, 1896
- Origin: New Orleans, Louisiana, U.S.
- Died: August 30, 1982 (aged 86)
- Genres: Jazz
- Instrument: Trumpet
- Formerly of: Johnny Dodds

Anatie "Natty" Dominique (August 2, 1896 – August 30, 1982) was an American jazz trumpeter, who was born in New Orleans, Louisiana, United States, and most notable for his long body of work with Johnny Dodds.
