= Rudi Blesh =

American jazz critic and enthusiast (1899–1985)

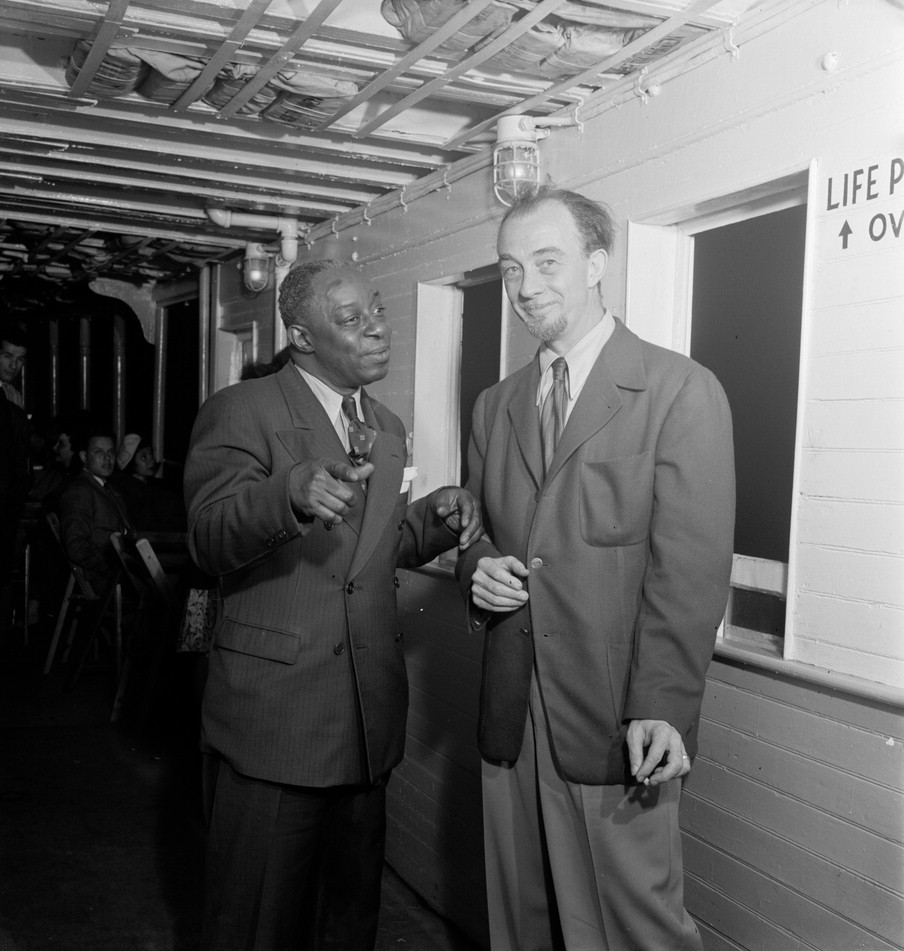
- Blesh (right) and Baby Dodds in 1947
- Born: Rudolph Pickett Blesh; January 21, 1899; Guthrie, Oklahoma, U.S.
- Died: August 25, 1985 (aged 86); Gilmanton, New Hampshire, U.S.
- Education: Dartmouth College
- Occupation: Jazz critic
- Years active: 1940s–1971
- Notable work: They All Played Ragtime (1950)

Rudolph Pickett Blesh (January 21, 1899 – August 25, 1985) was an American jazz critic and enthusiast.

== Biography ==
Blesh studied at Dartmouth College and held jobs writing jazz reviews for the San Francisco Chronicle and the New York Herald Tribune in the 1940s. He was a prolific promoter of jazz concerts, particularly New Orleans jazz, and hosted a jazz radio program, This Is Jazz, in 1947. (These shows have been reissued by Jazzology Records.)

Blesh in collaboration with Harriet Janis (mother of actor and jazz band leader Conrad Janis) wrote They All Played Ragtime which was published in 1950 by Alfred A. Knopf. A promotional record consisting of "Maple Leaf Rag" arranged on piano roll in 1907 and an interview with the co-authors was sent to radio stations. They All Played Ragtime proved to be a popular book and is credited as the cause for a renewed public interest in ragtime music. Blesh founded Circle Records in 1946, which recorded new material from aging early jazz musicians as well as the Library of Congress recordings of Jelly Roll Morton. Together they sparked renewed interest in the music of Joseph Lamb, James P. Johnson, and Eubie Blake, among others.

Blesh retired from writing in 1971. He held professorships at several universities later in his life, and wrote liner notes to jazz albums almost up until the time of his death. In 1976, he was nominated for a Grammy Award for his liner notes to Joplin: The Complete Works of Scott Joplin performed by Dick Hyman.

He died on August 25, 1985, on his farm in New Hampshire from a myocardial infarction, aged 86. He was survived by his daughter, Hilary.

== Partial bibliography ==
- Shining Trumpets (A History of Jazz). First published 1946 in the US by Alfred A Knopf Ltd. Published 1949 in the UK by Cassell & Co Ltd. Second revised and expanded edition 1958.
- They All Played Ragtime. First published 1950 in the US by Alfred A Knopf Ltd.
- Keaton (authorized biography of Buster Keaton), 1966
