= Southland Records =

American record label

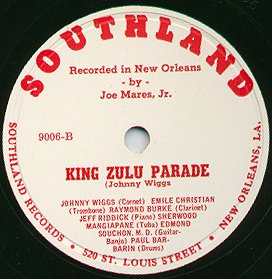
- Parent company: Jazzology
- Founded: 1953
- Founder: Joe Mares
- Genre: Jazz
- Country of origin: U.S.
- Location: New Orleans, Louisiana
- Official website: jazzology.com

Southland Records is a record label in New Orleans, Louisiana, United States specializing in blues and jazz.

Southland Records was founded in 1953 by Joe Mares, a clarinetist and younger brother of trumpeter Paul Mares. He created the label after realizing many musicians in New Orleans were unsigned to record labels. Mares recorded George Lewis, Papa Celestin, Sharkey Bonano, Nick LaRocca, and Raymond Burke.

Bands practiced at the label's studio behind Mares Brothers Furs, a company established by his father, uncle, and grandfather. Sessions were recorded at concert halls and at TV and radio stations. In the 1960s, Mares sold the label to George Buck and it became part of the Jazzology Records group under the control of the George H. Buck Jr. Jazz Foundation.

== Roster ==
- Jimmy Ballero
- Big Bill Broonzy
- Wendell Brunious
- Dan Burley
- Red Callender
- Erving Charles
- Pops Foster
- Ernie Freeman
- Hezekiah and The Houserockers
- John Jackson
- Homesick James
- Thomas Jefferson
- Larry Johnson
- Robert Lockwood Jr.
- Eddie Kirkland
- Joe Lastie
- Booker T. Laury
- Albert Macon
- Ray Martinez
- Brownie McGhee
- Chuck Norris
- Piano Red
- Pontchartrain Shakers
- Snooky Pryor
- Doctor Ross
- Sister Rosetta Tharpe
- The Soul Blues Boys
- Robert Thomas
- Son Thomas
- Henry & Vernell Townsend
- Eric Traub
- Floyd Turnham
- George Washington
- Robert Pete Williams
- Teddy Woods
