= Langlois & Wentworth, Inc. =

American radio program recording company

Langlois & Wentworth, Inc. was an American company founded in 1933 that recorded radio shows for broadcast. Its Lang-Worth label recorded jazz and popular music on discs sold to radio stations.

== History ==
The company was founded by Cyril Ouelette Langlois, Sr. (1893–1957) and Ralph Clarke Wentworth (1891–1954) and was based in New York City. Transcription discs were sold on a subscription basis and, at the time, none was sold to the public. Like other transcriptions companies, the company tried to move away from using music that required its subscribing radio stations to pay additional fees to copyright holders, and began to use music in the public domain. By 1935, the company had eliminated the use of copyrighted music, although the policy was later relaxed. In the 1940s, the music service library was divided into two groups: the "5000" service with white labels, reserved for ASCAP music, and yellow labels, reserved for non-ASCAP licensed music, which included BMI, SESAC, public domain music, and others.

== Lang–Worth Feature Programs, Inc. ==
In 1935, Langlois & Wentworth founded a new division called Lang–Worth Feature Programs, Inc., a radio transcription service that was completely copyright-free, except for the copyrighting of its own work. Most of the music was in the public domain, but some was purchased, at great expense. The "C.S." on its labels indicated that the music was "cleared at source by Lang-Worth." The company purported to have the largest collection of public domain music in the world and, for its subscribers, offered a library of over 300 selections with a guarantee of 120 new selections every month.

The service filled the gap during the musicians' strike against the major record companies between 1942 and 1944, although Lang-Worth continued to do business for a number of years after WWII. The company was headquartered in New York at Steinway Hall and had a printing plant at 55-20 Grand Avenue, Maspeth, Queens, New York.

Lang-Worth artists included the Mills Brothers, Count Basie, Woody Herman, Elton Britt, Henry Jerome, and Patti Page.

== Founders & management ==
Cyril Ouelette Langlois, Sr., was a former advertising executive from Detroit, and later, a Newspaper advertising professional in New York, and a graduate of University of Detroit Mercy. Cyril Langlois' sons, Cyril Ouelette Langlois, Jr. (1922–1986), a 1944 graduate of the University of Rochester, and John D. Langlois (born 1918–1978), became president and vice president, respectively. Wentworth had been a musician, actor, radio announcer, and was a graduate of the University of Washington.

== Provenance ==
On March 14, 1942, Wentworth sold his interest in the company to Emile Cote (né Louis Emile Côté; 1898–1980), a singer and choral director who was active in radio. In 1946, Cote left the company to become head of A&R at National Records. At some point after that, Ray Norman purchased the entire catalog of Lang-Worth radio transcriptions. In 1982, George H. Buck, Jr., purchased the entire catalog from Ray Norman for $110,000.

== Other transcription services ==
- M. M. Cole
- RCA Thesaurus
- Standard Transcription Library
- World Broadcasting System
