= Max Kaminsky (musician) =

American jazz trumpeter and bandleader (1908–1994)

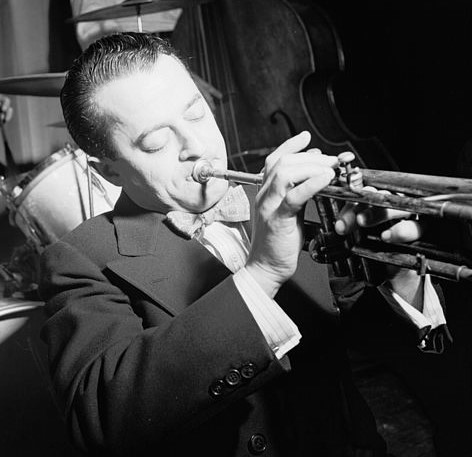
- Kaminsky, c. 1946

Background information
- Born: September 7, 1908
- Origin: Brockton, Massachusetts, U.S.
- Died: September 6, 1994 (aged 85)
- Genres: Swing; big band
- Occupation: Musician
- Instrument: Trumpet

Max Kaminsky (September 7, 1908 – September 6, 1994) was an American jazz trumpeter and bandleader.

== Biography ==
Kaminsky was born in Brockton, Massachusetts, near Boston, to a Jewish family. He began his career in Boston in 1924 and, by 1928, was working in Chicago with George Wettling and Frank Teschemacher at the Cinderella Ballroom and in New York for a brief period in 1929 with Red Nichols. He was primarily known for performing in the Dixieland idiom. At one time he played for the Original Dixieland Jass Band.

From about 1933–1938, he worked in commercially oriented dance bands, at the same time recording with Eddie Condon and Benny Carter's Chocolate Dandies (1933) and with Mezz Mezzrow (1933–34). He played with Tommy Dorsey (1936, 1938) and Artie Shaw (briefly in 1938), performed and recorded with Bud Freeman (1939–40) and worked again with Shaw (1941–43), who led a navy band with which Kaminsky toured the South Pacific.

From 1942, he took part in important concerts in New York City that were organized by Condon at Carnegie Hall and Town Hall, and from the following year he played Dixieland with various groups. He also worked in the 1940s with Sidney Bechet, George Brunis, Art Hodes, Joe Marsala, Willie "The Lion" Smith, and Jack Teagarden. On December 15, 1949, he played the opening of Birdland, with Charlie Parker, Lester Young, Hot Lips Page, and Lennie Tristano.

He began to work as a musician for television programs, and led Jackie Gleason's personal band for several seasons, toured Europe with Teagarden's and Earl Hines' All Stars (1957), and performed at the Metropole and Ryan's in New York (at intervals from the late 1960s to 1983, the Newport Jazz Festival and the New York World's Fair (1964–5).

In 1975–76 he made recordings as a leader that well illustrate his style, which is full-toned, economical and swinging in the manner of King Oliver, Freddy Keppard and Louis Armstrong.

My Life in Jazz, Kaminsky's autobiography written with V. E. Hughes, was published in 1963 and concentrates on his early career.

== Death ==
He died on September 6, 1994, the day before his 86th birthday. The trumpeter's collection of photographs, reel to reel tapes, and jazz artifacts is housed at the Hogan Jazz Archive at Tulane University in New Orleans. His family believed the university's location was the most fitting for the donation.
