= Art Hodes =

American jazz and blues pianist (1904–1993)

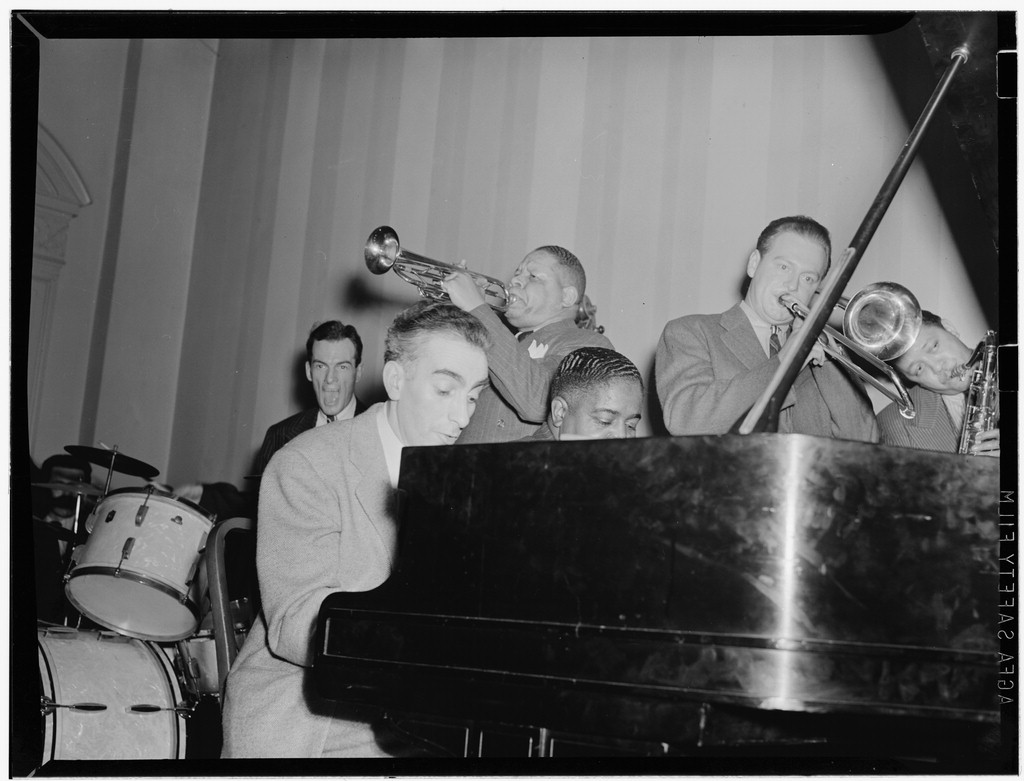
- Hodes (left) on the piano with Pete Johnson.

Background information
- Born: Arthur W. Hodes; November 14, 1904; Nikolaev, Russian Empire
- Died: March 4, 1993 (aged 88) Harvey, Illinois, U.S.
- Genres: Jazz
- Occupation: Musician
- Instrument: Piano

Arthur W. Hodes (November 14, 1904 – March 4, 1993), was a Russian-born American jazz and blues pianist. He is regarded by many critics as the greatest white blues pianist.

== Biography ==
Hodes was born in Nikolaev, in the Russian Empire (now Mykolaiv, Ukraine). His family settled in Chicago, Illinois, when he was a few months old. His career began in Chicago clubs, but he did not gain wider attention until moving to New York City in 1938. In New York, he played with Sidney Bechet, Joe Marsala, and Mezz Mezzrow.

Later, Hodes founded his own band in the 1940s and it would be associated with his hometown of Chicago. He and his band played mostly in that area for the next forty years. In the late 1960s, Hodes starred in a series of TV shows on Chicago style jazz called Jazz Alley, where he appeared with musicians such as Pee Wee Russell and Jimmy McPartland. Episodes of the show have been released on DVD.

Hodes was editor of the magazine, The Jazz Record, for five years in the 1940s.

He remained an educator and writer in jazz. During this period of his life and into the 1970s, Hodes resided in south suburban Park Forest, Illinois. He played as a member of the Hot Three with vibraphonist Don DeMicheal and clarinetist Kenny Davern.

He toured the UK in 1987, recording with drummer John Petters. In 1988, he visited Ireland to appear at the Cork Jazz Festival with Petters and Wild Bill Davison. A tour, the Legends of American Dixieland, followed in May 1989 with the same line-up.

Other musicians he played and recorded with included Louis Armstrong, Wingy Manone, Gene Krupa, Muggsy Spanier, Joe Marsala, Mezz Mezzrow, Sidney Bechet, Kenny Davern, Albert Nicholas, Wild Bill Davison, Barney Bigard, and Vic Dickenson.

In 1998, he was inducted into the Big Band and Jazz Hall of Fame.

Ethan Iverson wrote an article on Hodes, "Selections from the Gutter", which includes a transcription of Hodes's first 78, "Ross Tavern Boogie".

Hodes died in March 1993, in Harvey, Illinois, at the age of 88.

== Quotation ==
Bebop? Avant-garde? Yeah, I heard of them. I also heard of these kids called the Bright Brothers – Wright Brothers? – who claim they can make you fly. It'll never catch on, none of it.

— Art Hodes (1981)

== Discography ==
=== As leader/co-leader ===
Year recorded	Title	Label	Notes
1944	Apex Blues	Jazzology	Trio, with Mezz Mezzrow (clarinet), Danny Alvin (drums); in concert
1961?	Cat on the Keys	Concert-Disc	w/ Milt Grosz, Eddie Burleton, Truck Parham & Freddie Kohlman
1965	And His All-Star Stompers	Jazzology	With Larry Conger (trumpet), Charlie Bornemann (trombone), Tony Parenti (clarinet), Johnny Haynes (bass), Cliff Leeman (drums)
1968	Bucket's Got A Hole In It	Delmark	With Barney Bigard (clarinet and co-leader), Rail Wilson (bass), Barrett Deems (drums) - Nap Trottier (trumpet) and George Brunis (trombone) on some tracks
1971	Recollections from the Past	Solo Art	Solo piano, plus narration
1971	Art For Art's Sake	Jazzology	
1972	Up in Volly's Room	Delmark	With Nappy Trottier (trumpet), George Brunis (trombone), Volly DeFaut (clarinet), Truck Parham (bass), Barrett Deems (drums)
1976?	I Remember Bessie	Euphonic	reissued by Delmark
1973	Selections From The Gutter	Storyville Records	
1977	Indianapolis Concert	Solo Art	Duo, with Herb Guy (bass); in concert
1976–78	Tribute to the Greats	Euphonic	Solo piano; reissued by Delmark
1978	Echoes of Chicago	Jazzology	With full ensemble
1978	Art Hodes and the Magnolia Jazz Band, Volume One	GHB	
1978	Art Hodes and the Magnolia Jazz Band, Volume Two	GHB	
1980	When Music Was Music	Euphonic Sound Recordings	
1981	Blues to Save the Trees	L + R	Some tracks solo piano; some tracks trio, with Reimer Von Essen (clarinet), Trevor Richards (drums)
1981	Someone to Watch Over Me, "Live at Hanratty's"	Muse	Solo piano
1983	South Side Memories	Sackville	Solo piano
1983	At Cafe Des Copains	Solo Art	Solo piano; in concert
1985	Blues in the Night	Sackville	Solo piano
1986	Glad to Be Here	Solo Art	Solo piano
1986	Art Hodes Jazz Trio	Jazzology	With Trevor Whiting (reeds), John Petters (drums), Dave Bennett (vocals)
1987	Art Hodes Trio	Jazzology	Trio, with Reimer Von Essen (clarinet, alto sax), Trevor Richards (drums)
1987	Art Hodes Blue Five and Six	Jazzology	With Al Fairweather and Pat Halcox (trumpet), Wally Fawkes (clarinet), Fapy Lafertin (guitar), Andy Brown (bass), Dave Evans and Stan Greig (drums), Johnny Mars (vocals)
1987?	Joy to the Jazz World	Parkwood	Solo piano
1988	Pagin' Mr. Jelly	Candid	Solo piano
1988	Something Personal Alone With Friends	Dawn Club 77-Series	Solo piano
1988	Keepin' out of Mischief Now	Candid	Solo piano
	Together Again	CMJ	with Wild Bill Davison & John Petters
	Sensation	CMJ	with John Petters & Trevor Whiting
	Coalition	Jazzology	With Wild Bill Davison (cornet), Campbell Burnap (trombone), Dave Bailey (clarinet), Keith Donald (bass), John Peters (drums)

=== Compilations ===
- Vintage Art Hodes (Jazzology, 1930–50)
- Sessions at Blue Note (1944)
- The Jazz Record Story (Jazzology, 1943–46)
- The Duets (Solo Art, 1969–77)
- The Parkwood Creative Concept Sessions, Volume I (Parkwood, 1987–89)

=== Side appearances ===
- Sidney Bechet, 1940s, early 1950s recordings on Blue Note
- Baby Dodds, 1940s recordings on Blue Note
- Mezz Mezzrow, Mezz Mezzrow And His Band, Blue Note, 1952
- Tony Parenti and His New Orleanians, Tony Parenti and His New Orleanians Jazzology, 1958
- Albert Nicholas, All-Star Stompers, Delmark, 1964
