= Baby Dodds =

American jazz drummer (1898–1959)

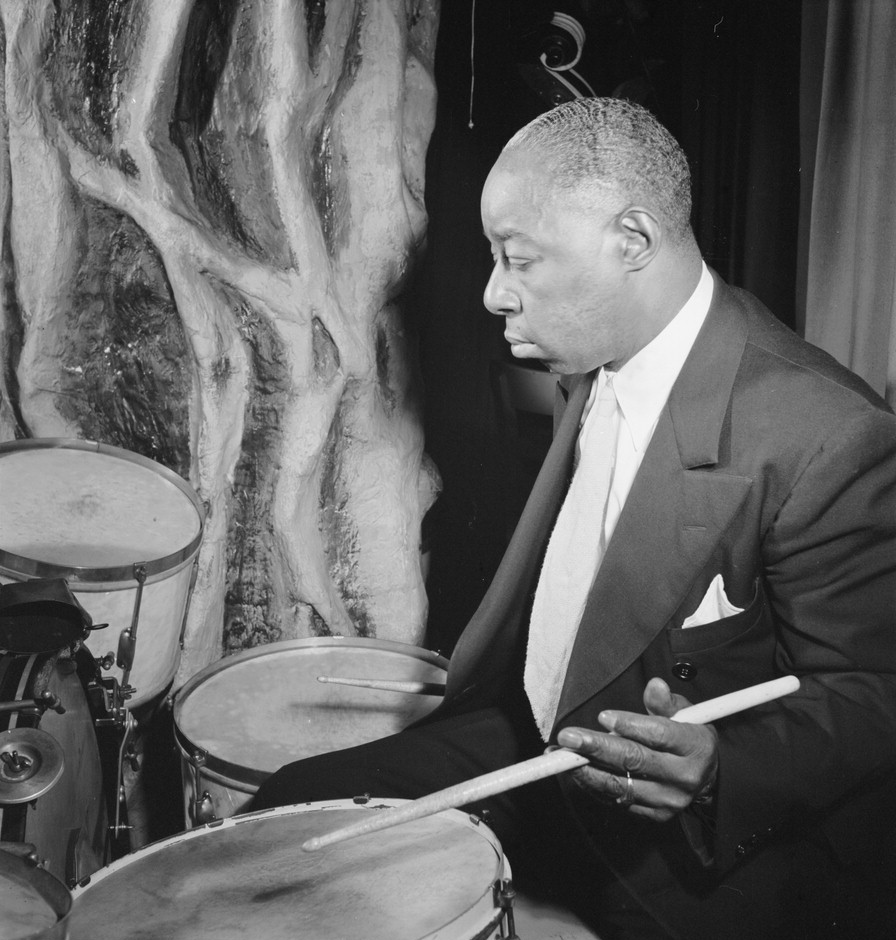
- Baby Dodds, Ole South, New York, c. December 1946, Image: William P. Gottlieb

Background information
- Born: Warren Dodds; December 24, 1898; New Orleans, Louisiana, U.S.
- Died: February 14, 1959 (aged 60) Chicago, Illinois, U.S.
- Genres: Jazz, Dixieland
- Occupation: Musician
- Instrument: Drums

Warren "Baby" Dodds (December 24, 1898 – February 14, 1959) was an American jazz drummer born in New Orleans, Louisiana. He is regarded as one of the best jazz drummers of the pre-big band era. He varied his drum patterns with accents and flourishes, and he generally kept the beat with the bass drum while playing buzz rolls on the snare. Early influences included Louis Cottrell, Sr., Dave Perkins, and Tubby Hall. Dodds was among the first drummers to be recorded improvising while performing.

== Early years ==
"Baby" Dodds was the younger brother of clarinetist Johnny Dodds. His mother, who died when he was nine years old, taught him valuable lessons about persistence and putting one's whole effort into endeavors, and he carried these with him through his career as a jazz drummer. He was born into a very musical family. His father and uncle played violin and his sister played harmonica. In addition, his father was religious and the family regularly sang hymns together. Dodds, in his autobiography The Baby Dodds Story, told the story of making his first drum: "I took a lard can and put holes in the bottom and turned it over and took nails and put holes around the top of it. Then I took some rungs out of my mother's chairs and made drumsticks out of them". At age 16, Dodds saved up enough money to buy his own drum set. Although Dodds had several paid teachers during his early years as a drummer, various jazz drummers around New Orleans also influenced him. He started playing in street parades around New Orleans with Bunk Johnson and his band and then gained a job playing in Willie Hightower's band, the American Stars. The band played in various venues around New Orleans, and Dodds recalled hearing many musicians along the way, including Buddy Bolden, John Robichaux, and Jelly Roll Morton. He played with several different outfits including those of Frankie Duson and Sonny Celestin, and he was part of the New Orleans tradition of playing jazz during funeral marches. Dodds describes this experience in his autobiography: "The jazz played after New Orleans funerals didn't show any lack of respect for the person being buried. It rather showed their people that we wanted them to be happy".

== Prime years ==
Dodds gained a reputation as a top young drummer in New Orleans. In 1918, Dodds left Sonny Celestin's group to play in Fate Marable's riverboat band. A teenaged Louis Armstrong also joined the band, and the two of them were on the boats together. The band played on four different boats, and usually left New Orleans in May and traveled to St. Louis, though they also sometimes traveled further north. They played jazz, popular, and classical music while on the boats. Dodds and Armstrong left Fate Marable's band in 1921 due to a disagreement about musical style, and Dodds soon joined King Oliver's Creole Jazz Band. At this time, the personnel in Oliver's band were Joe "King" Oliver on cornet, Baby Dodds' brother Johnny Dodds on clarinet, Davey Jones on alto saxophone, Honoré Dutrey on trombone, Lil Hardin on piano, Jimmy Palao on violin, and Eddie Garland on bass fiddle. They moved to California in 1921 to work with Oliver there, and they played together for about fifteen months. In 1922, the band, excepting Garland, Palao, and Jones, followed Oliver to Chicago, which would be his base of operations for several years. They began playing at the Lincoln Gardens, and Armstrong also joined this outfit. Dodds describes playing with this band as "a beautiful experience". King Oliver's Creole Jazz Band broke up in 1924 due to disagreements about travel and musical style; the argument became so heated that the Dodds brothers threatened to beat up Oliver. Dodds recorded with Armstrong, Jelly Roll Morton, Art Hodes, and his brother Johnny Dodds. Dodds played in Armstrong's Hot Five and Hot Seven groups. In May 1927, Armstrong recorded with the Hot Seven, which consisted of Johnny Dodds, Johnny St. Cyr, Lil Hardin Armstrong, John Thomas, Pete Briggs, and Baby Dodds. From September to December 1927, the Hot Five Armstrong assembled consisted of Johnny Dodds, Kid Ory, Johnny St. Cyr, Lonnie Johnson, and Baby Dodds. During the decade, he also performed with the Black Bottom Stompers, Chicago Footwarmers, Willie Hightower, and Charlie Elgar.

== Later years ==
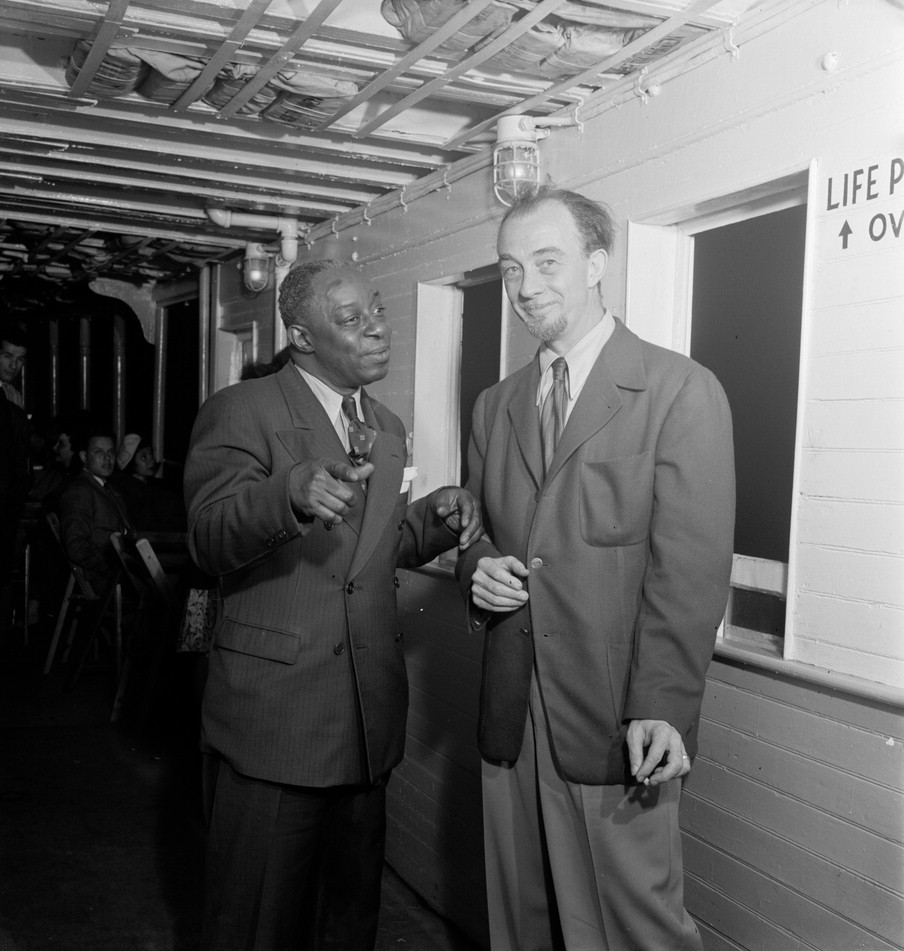
Dodds (left) and Rudi Blesh in July 1947

During the 1930s, Dodds performed with Lil Hardin, Natty Dominique, and the Three Deuces's house band.

After the Oliver band broke up, the Dodds brothers played at Burt Kelley's Stables in Chicago, and soon after, Johnny Dodds began leading his own outfit, of which Baby was a part. Johnny Dodds died of a stroke in 1940. Of his brother, Baby Dodds said the following: "There just couldn't be another Johnny Dodds or anyone to take his place. And his passing on made a big difference in my life. I had been connected with him for many years and from then on I had to be wholly on my own". After his brother's death, Baby Dodds worked mostly as a freelance drummer around Chicago. This was the time of the New Orleans Revival, which was a movement in response to the emerging style of bebop. Many jazz traditionalists wanted jazz to return to its roots during this time. Dodds, having remained a New Orleans style drummer untouched by the influence of swing, found himself playing a role in the New Orleans jazz revival. In 1941, he played with Jimmie Noone and his band for a short time. This band featured Mada Roy on piano, Noone on clarinet, Bill Anderson on bass, and Dodds on drums. Dodds stayed with this outfit for only three months before they went to California, while Dodds decided to stay in Chicago. In the late 1940s he worked at Jimmy Ryan's in New York City. On some of his trips back to New Orleans, he recorded with Bunk Johnson. Dodds ended up playing with Johnson's band in New York. Dodds described his impressions of New York as a place where people listened to jazz rather than dancing to it: "When I first went to New York it seemed very strange to have people sitting around and listening rather than dancing. In a way, it was similar to theatre work. But it was peculiar for me because I always felt as though I was doing something for the people if they danced to the music". After playing with several outfits in New York, he joined Mezz Mezzrow's group on a tour of Europe in 1948 that lasted eight weeks. The group ended up playing solely in France, and Dodds had a great experience, saying that Europeans "take our kind of music much more seriously than they do in our own country". They played at the Nice Festival along with Rex Stewart, Louis Armstrong, and several other American jazz musicians.

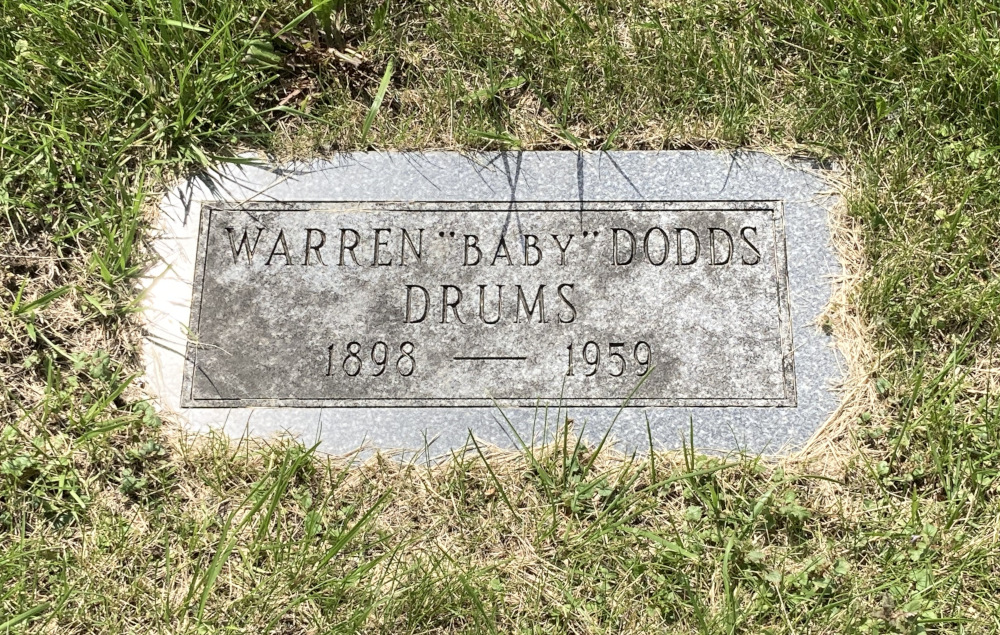
Dodds' grave at Lincoln Cemetery

Dodds returned to Chicago after the European tour and while taking a trip to New York in April 1949, he suffered a stroke. In 1950 he had his second stroke and in 1952 suffered a third. After his three strokes, Dodds tutored and played in public as much as he could, though he was unable to complete entire performances. He retired in 1957. He died on February 14, 1959, in Chicago, and was buried at Lincoln Cemetery in Blue Island, Illinois.

== The relationship between Baby and Johnny ==
Several accounts of the Dodds brothers suggest that they did not always get along. When the brothers were younger, Johnny got a clarinet from his father but Baby did not get a drum even though he asked for one. In The Baby Dodds Story, Dodds discusses his jealousy of his older brother when they were children. As they grew up, Johnny refused to let Baby play music with him because Baby was a heavy drinker and Johnny did not drink. When Joe Oliver hired Baby and Johnny saw how much Baby's talent as a drummer had grown, however, Johnny changed his mind. Although they continued to argue about Baby's drinking habits, they grew closer as brothers and musicians, and as suggested above, Baby was greatly affected by his brother's death.

== The validity of The Baby Dodds Story ==
In 1959, Larry Gara's The Baby Dodds Story was published for the first time. The revised edition was published in 1992. Several critics have questioned the validity of this book, given the fact that it is solely Baby Dodds giving an extensive interview, and therefore the events in the book are based on what Dodds himself remembers. In his introduction, Gara explains the interview process, which took place in 1953, every Sunday for about twelve weeks. Gara's wife transcribed the interview between Gara and Dodds, and Gara then edited the interviews. Gara wanted this book to be Baby Dodds telling his story rather than Gara telling it. Gara did, however, exhibit the same concerns that various critics have exhibited: one person may not remember things exactly as they happened. He, therefore, consulted jazz historian Bill Russell, who helped Gara check Dodds' interviews for details that historical findings did not support. The finished product is a narrative by Baby Dodds with minimal footnotes from Gara. Although some details may be exaggerated, The Baby Dodds Story serves as a depiction of early jazz and its many influences as seen through Dodds' eyes.

== Recording sessions ==
In many of his recordings, Dodds had to use a wood block rather than a drum set because of the nature of the recording technology. It was therefore difficult to hear Dodds' original style from early recordings, such as his 1923 sessions with King Oliver's Creole Jazz Band. Dodds did, however, begin recording again in 1940, and by this time, the technology was able to show his talent on the drum set. Dodds is perhaps the first jazz drummer to record unaccompanied: in 1945 he recorded two solos for Circle Records, and the next year recorded a series of solos and reminiscences for Folkways Records. On his part of the record, Dodds discusses his drumming techniques and his drumset and playing examples of techniques. This record gives an idea of what Dodds would have sounded like in his prime had the recording technology been what it is today. In 1954, he played for a Natty Dominique recording session which also featured bassman Israel Crosby and pianist Lil Hardin Armstrong.

== Dodds' drumming style ==
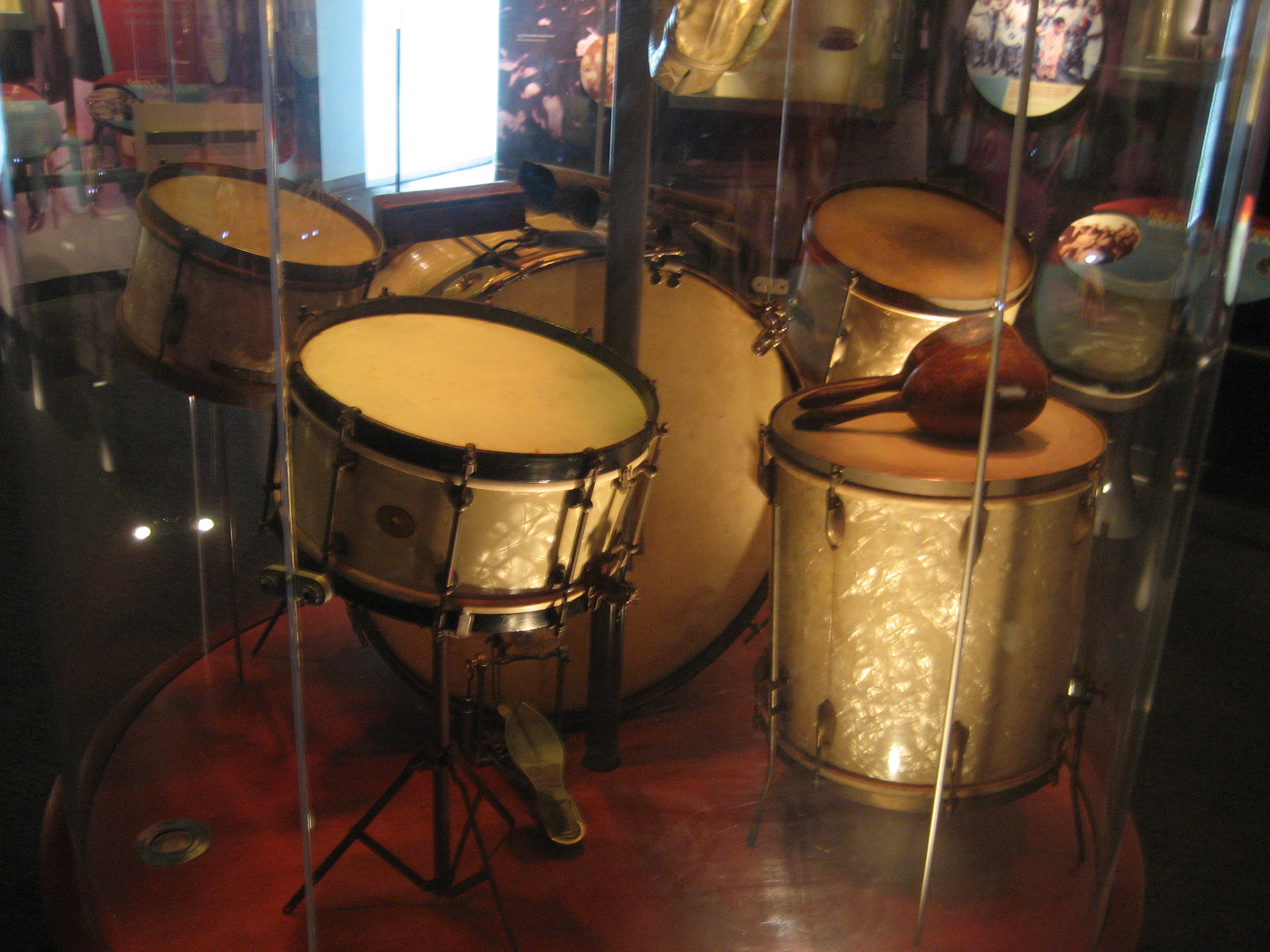
Drum set used by Baby Dodds, Louisiana State Museum, Baton Rouge, Louisiana

Dodds continues to be admired for the creativity of his playing. He believed in playing something different for every chorus of every tune. Most of his contemporaries played a short buzz or press roll on the backbeats (the 2nd and 4th beats), but Dodds played a long roll that lasted till the following beat, which created a smoother time feel that he later developed into the jazz ride pattern most commonly used ever since. Dodds was best known, however, for what he called his "shimmy beat", which he first used in 1918 at Jack Sheehan's in New Orleans. He described it in his autobiography: "One night a French soldier came in. When he heard the music he couldn't dance to it, but he just started to shake all over. That's the way it affected me. I saw him do it and I did it, too". Dodds' unique shimmy beat caught Louis Armstrong's eye as well, who said: "To watch him play, especially when he beat on the rim of his bass in a hot chorus, he sort of shimmied when he beat with his sticks. Oh! Boy that alone was in my estimation the whole worth of admission". Besides his unique drumming style, something important to Dodds was paying attention to the musicians in the outfit and fitting his drumming into the style the band was playing. He tried to get to know each member in the outfit and learn about how each person played his or her instrument. Throughout his autobiography, Dodds talks about listening to the different band members and using his role as a drummer to help the band come together: "It was my job to study each musician and give a different background for each instrument. When a man is playing it's up to the drummer to give him something to make him feel the music and make him work. That's the drummer's job".

Notable is the absence of the hi-hat cymbals and stands. Dodds never liked them: "I didn't like them and I still don't. Some drummers can't play without them. I can't play with them."

Baby Dodds also played washboard, though he reportedly did not like to playing it - vastly preferring the drums.

== Discography ==
- "Jazz à La Creole" (Baby Dodds Trio)
- "Baby Dodds"
- "Talking and Drum Solos"
- "Live At New York Town Hall 1947" (Mezz Mezzrow and Sidney Bechet-1947)
- "Bunk Johnson- The King Of The Blue"
- "Albert's Blues / Buddy Bolden Blues" Tell Record 29655 (78 rpm)

== Book ==
- The Baby Dodds Story Edition: As Told to Larry Gara

== Induction into the Downbeat Hall of Fame ==
In 2010, DownBeat magazine's Veterans Committee inducted Dodds into the DownBeat Hall of Fame. The Veterans Committee specifically looks at jazz artists who are no longer living who were overlooked for one reason or another while they were alive. The article in DownBeat about Dodds' induction again blames the recording technology in the 1920s, and it also acknowledges the fact that when Dodds was in his prime, the hi-hat had not yet been invented. By today's standards, Dodds played with an incomplete drum set for much of his career.

== Further research ==
The Historic New Orleans Collection holds The Baby Dodds Collection, which features 334 items that document much of Dodds' career. Included in this collection are transcribed interviews from Larry Gara and Bill Russell as well as material for a movie about Dodds that Russell worked on.
