= Jimmy Archey =

American jazz trombonist (1902–1967)

- Born: Jimmy Archey; 12 October 1902; Norfolk, Virginia, United States
- Died: 16 November 1967 (aged 65)
- Genres: Dixieland; Swing music
- Instrument: trombone
- Formerly of: James P. Johnson orchestra, King Oliver, Fats Waller, Luis Russell orchestra

Jimmy Archey (12 October 1902 – 16 November 1967) was an American jazz trombonist born in Norfolk, Virginia, perhaps most noteworthy for his work in several prominent jazz orchestras and big bands of his time (including his own). He performed and recorded with the James P. Johnson orchestra, King Oliver, Fats Waller and the Luis Russell orchestra, among others.

In the late 1930s, Archey participated in big bands that simultaneously featured musicians such as Benny Carter, Coleman Hawkins, Cab Calloway, Duke Ellington and Claude Hopkins. In the 1940s and 1950s, Archey spent much of his time working with New Orleans revivalist bands with artists such as Bob Wilber and Earl Hines.
