= Albert Nicholas =

American jazz clarinet player (1900–1973)

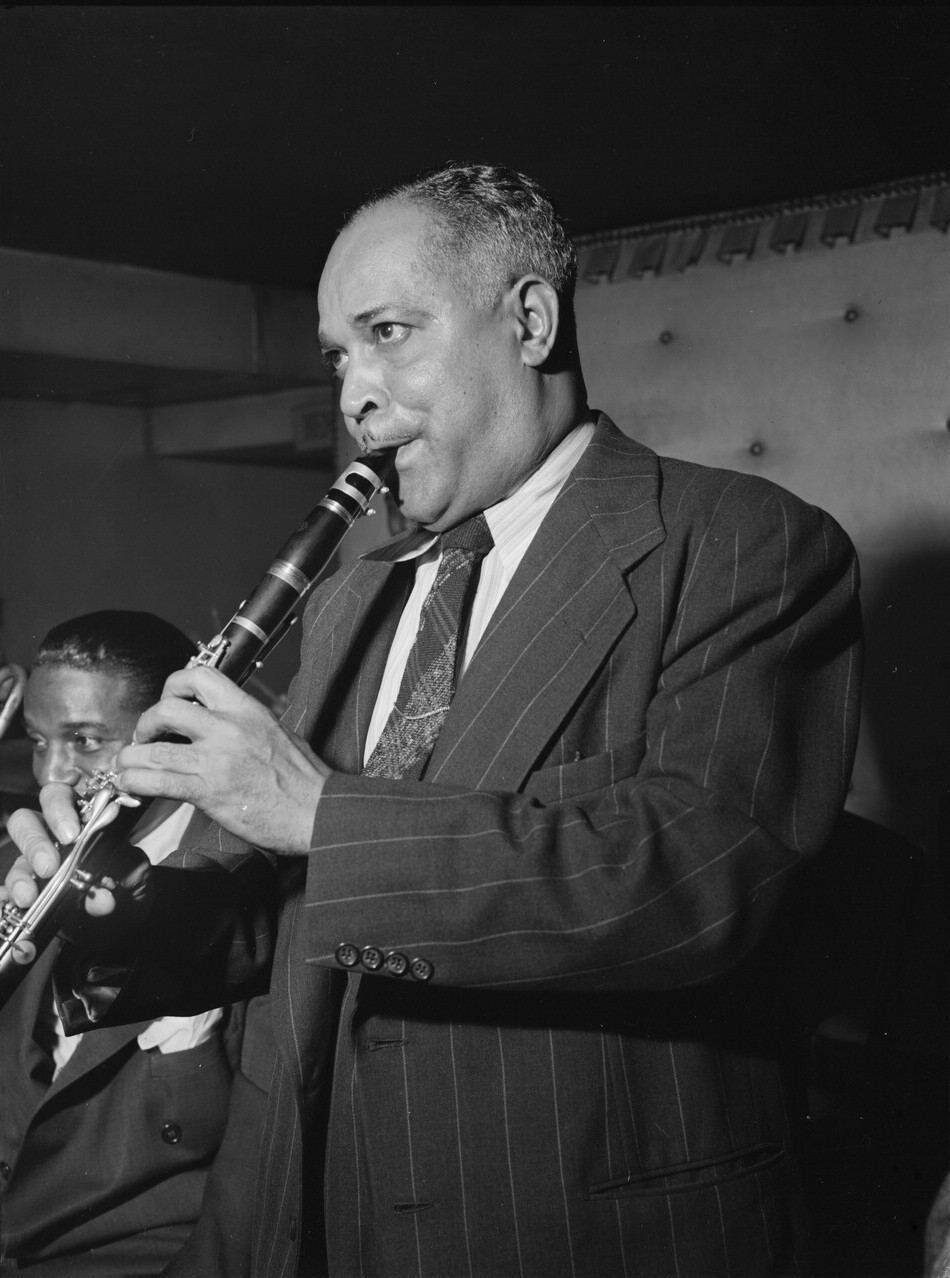
- Nicholas in Jimmy Ryan's club, New York City, c. 1947. Image: William P. Gottlieb

Background information
- Born: May 27, 1900; New Orleans, Louisiana, U.S.
- Died: September 3, 1973 (aged 73) Basel, Switzerland
- Genres: Jazz
- Occupation: Musician
- Instrument: Clarinet
- Years active: 1910s–1973

Albert Nicholas (May 27, 1900 – September 3, 1973) was an American jazz clarinet player, who was mostly based in Europe after 1953.

== Career ==
Nicholas's primary instrument was the clarinet, which he studied with Lorenzo Tio in his hometown of New Orleans, Louisiana, United States. Late in the 1910s, he played with Buddy Petit, King Oliver, and Manuel Perez. He spent three years in the Merchant Marines and then joined Oliver in Chicago from 1925 to 1927. After time in East Asia and Egypt, Nicholas returned to New York City in 1928 and played with Luis Russell until 1933, playing there with Red Allen, Charlie Holmes, and J. C. Higginbotham. Later he played with Chick Webb, Louis Armstrong (with Russell) and Jelly Roll Morton.

The Dixieland jazz revival of the late 1940s reinvigorated his career; he played with Art Hodes, Bunk Johnson, and Kid Ory, and had a regular gig with Ralph Sutton in 1948.

In 1953, Nicholas moved to Paris, France; except for recording sessions in the U.S. in 1959–60, he remained in Europe for most of the rest of his life.

Nicholas died in Basel, Switzerland, in September 1973, at the age of 73.

== Discography ==
- Albert Nicholas & Mezz Mezzrow (Jazztone, 1956)
- Albert's Back in Town (Delmark, 1959)
- The Scobey Story Vol. 1 (Good Time Jazz, 1959)
- Albert Nicholas with Art Hodes' All-Star Stompers (Delmark, 1964)
- Albert's Blues (77 Records, 1966)
- Barney Bigard/Albert Nicholas (RCA, 1969)
- A Tribute to Jelly Roll Morton (Storyville, 1972)
- Albert Nicholas and The Traditional Jazz Studio (Supraphon, 1972)
- Albert Nicholas with Alan Elsdon's Band Vol. 1 (Jazzology, 1995)
- Albert Nicholas with Alan Elsdon's Band Vol. 2 (Jazzology, 1996)
- Story 1926–1947 (EPM, 1998)
- New Orleans Clarinet (Sanctuary, 2006)
- Albert Nicholas & Herb Hall (GHB, 2015)
- Albert Nicholas In Europe (Upbeat URCD284)
- As It Is When It Was (2020)
