= Pops Foster =

American jazz musician (1892–1969)

Background information
- Born: George Murphy Foster; May 19, 1892; McCall, Louisiana, U.S.
- Died: October 30, 1969 (aged 77) San Francisco, California, U.S.
- Genres: Jazz
- Occupation: Musician
- Instruments: String bass, Tuba, Trumpet
- Formerly of: King Oliver, Kid Ory

George Murphy "Pops" Foster (May 19, 1892 – October 30, 1969) was an American jazz musician, best known for his vigorous slap bass playing of the string bass. He also played the tuba and trumpet professionally.

== Biography ==
Foster was born to Charley and Annie Foster, who "was nearly fullblooded Cherokee," on a plantation near McCall in Ascension Parish near Donaldsonville in south Louisiana, United States. His family moved to New Orleans when he was about 10 years of age. His older brother, Willard Foster, began playing banjo and guitar; George started out on a cello then switched to string bass. Foster married twice: to Bertha Foster in 1912 and Alma Foster in 1936.

Pops Foster was playing professionally by 1907 and worked with Jack Carey, Kid Ory, Armand Piron, King Oliver and other prominent hot bands of the era. In 1921, he moved to St. Louis, Missouri, to play with the Charlie Creath and Dewey Jackson bands, in which he would be active for much of the decade. He also joined Ory in Los Angeles. He acquired the nickname "Pops" because he was far older than any of the other players in the band.

In 1929, Foster moved to New York City, where he played with the bands of Luis Russell and Louis Armstrong through 1940. He gigged with New York-based bands through the 1940s, including those of Sidney Bechet, Art Hodes, and regularly participated in the national This Is Jazz radio program. He recorded with the Mezzrow-Bechet Quintet (Bechet, Mezz Mezzrow, Fitz Weston, and Kaiser Marshall) and Septet (on two consecutive dates in 1945, with Hot Lips Page (as Pappa Snow White), Sammy Price (as Jimmy Blythe Jr.), Danny Barker and Sid Catlett, and on the second session with Cousin Joe on vocals).

In the late 1940s, he began touring more widely and played in many countries in Europe, especially in France, and throughout the United States including returns to New Orleans and California.

The Autobiography of Pops Foster was published in 1971, with a new edition in 2005. Foster is quoted, "Some of the books are fouled up on the times in New Orleans", "and some of the guys weren't telling the truth." "The critics and guys who write about jazz think they know more about what went on in New Orleans than the guys that were there."

== Gallery ==
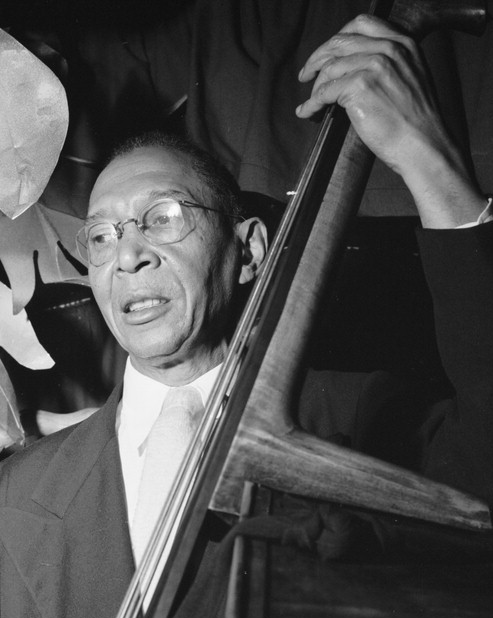
Pops Foster with Ole South Band, New York City in February 1947

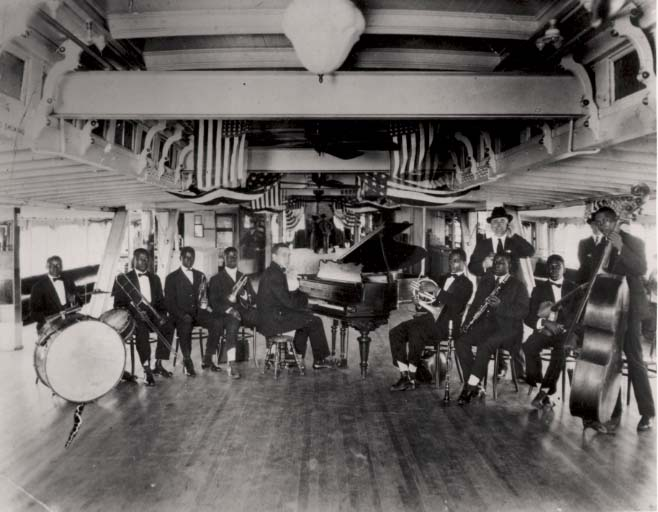
Pops Foster on string bass Fate Marable's New Orleans Band on the S. S. Sidney in 1918 or 1919

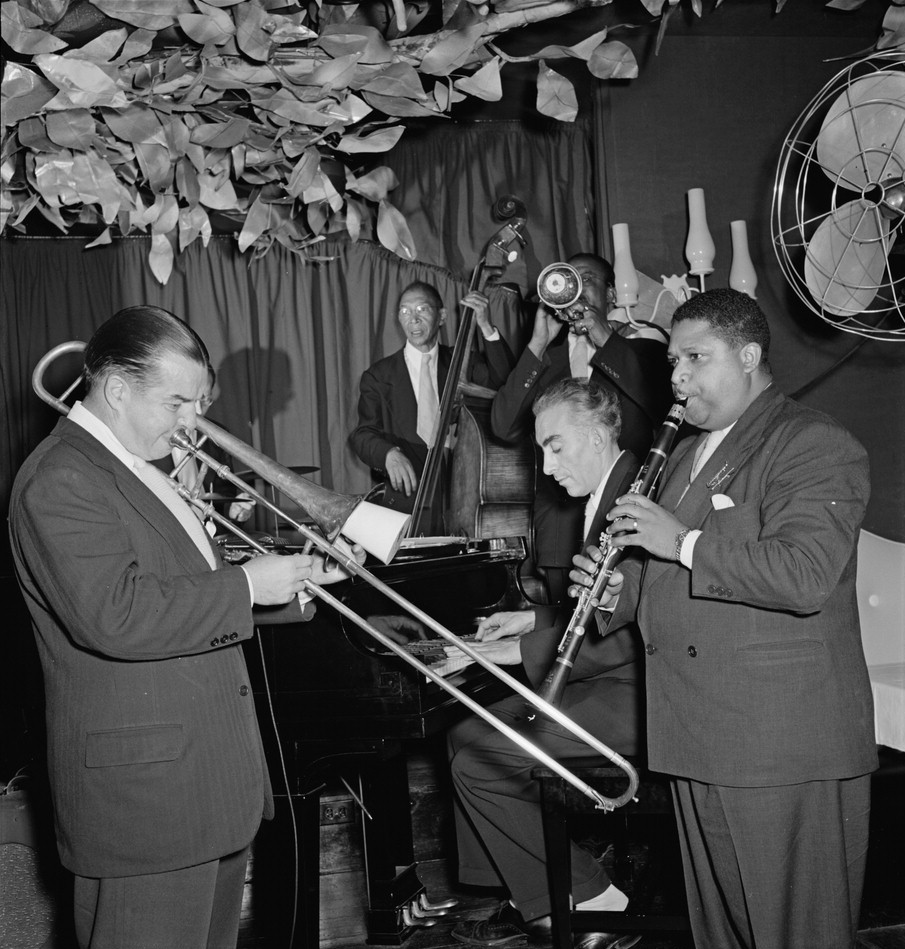
Art Hodes new band at the "Ole South" lines up with (left to right) George Luggi on trombone, Pops Foster on bass, Henry Goodwin on trumpet, Hodes on piano, Cecil Scott on clarinet and drummer Baby Dodds, is hidden

== Bibliography ==
- "George Murphy 'Pops' Foster", A Dictionary of Louisiana Biography, Vol. 1 (1988), p. 315
- John Chilton, Who's Who of Jazz: Storyville to Swing Street (1972)
