= Bill Davison =

American jazz cornetist (1906–1989)

Wild Bill Davison
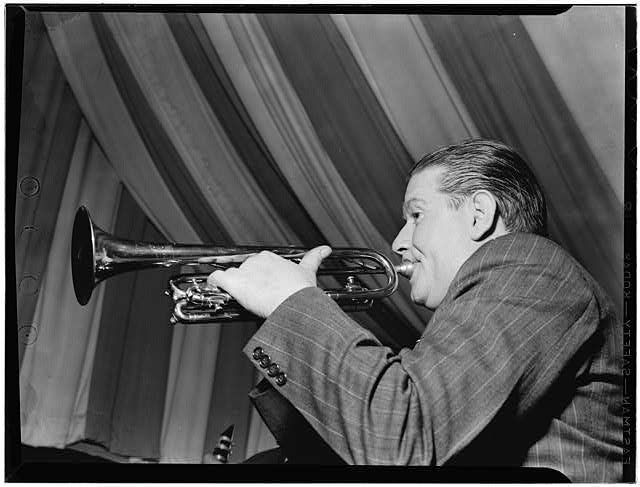
- Davison performing at Eddie Condon's, New York, c. June 1946

Background information
- Born: William Edward Davison; January 5, 1906; Defiance, Ohio, US
- Died: November 14, 1989 (aged 83) Santa Barbara, California, US
- Genres: Jazz
- Occupation: Musician
- Instrument: Cornet
- Years active: 1920s–1980s
- Formerly of: Eddie Condon

William Edward Davison (January 5, 1906 – November 14, 1989), nicknamed "Wild Bill", was an American jazz cornetist. He emerged in the 1920s through his work playing alongside Muggsy Spanier and Frank Teschemacher in a cover band where they played the music of Louis Armstrong, but he did not achieve wider recognition until the 1940s. He is best remembered for his association with bandleader Eddie Condon, with whom he worked and recorded from the mid-1940s until Condon's last concert at the New School for Social Research in New York in April 1972 (Chiaroscuro Records, CRD 110).

His nickname of "Wild Bill" reflected a reputation for heavy drinking and womanizing in his younger years.

== Reception ==
The poet Philip Larkin, a fan, described his playing thus:

"...a player of notable energy, he uses a wide range of conscious tonal distortions, heavy vibrato, and an urgent, bustling attack. At slow tempos he is melting, almost articulate. Humphrey Lyttelton has compared him with the kind of reveler who throws his arm round your neck one moment and tries to knock you down the next."

"All the same, his stylistic mannerisms-the deep hoarse blurrings, the athletic in-front-of-the-beat timing, the flaring shakes-are highly conscious (the 'Wild' is more a personal than a musical sobriquet), and, imposed as they are on a conventional Armstrong basis, make Davison one of the most exciting of white small-band cornetists. His sessions with Sidney Bechet for Blue Note are collisions of two furious jazz talents which at the same time were oddly sympathetic, and prove his ability to play in any kind of milieu; his numerous sides in the Condon tradition show him uniting with (Pee Wee) Russell in the same way. But solo after solo demonstrates that he is not a 'wild' player: each note is perfectly shaped and pitched as if the cornet were his speaking voice, in the style of his favorites (Louis) Armstrong and (Bobby) Hackett, and with an emotional immediacy always hard to parallel."

Richard M. Sudhalter described first seeing Wild Bill at Eddie Condon's club in New York City in the 1950s:

"Up there, incredibly, is Bill Davison himself, looking like anything *but* the standard image of the cornet or trumpet player. Not like Louis Armstrong, horn tilted up and eyes rolled back as the tone takes flight; not like Maxie Kaminsky, so tiny that his instrument seems gigantic in his hands. Not like Bix Beiderbecke, in some old photo or other, dented cornet pointed resolutely to the floor.

"Nope. This guy is seated, one leg crossed casually over the other, drink on an upended barrel in front of him. He sweeps the cornet into the side of his mouth to expel some supercharged phrase, then jerks it away as if it's too hot to keep there. And I realize, awe-struck, he's chewing *gum*! Where in the world does he *keep* that stuff when he's blowing?

"In short, he looked just the way he sounded - like a guy from Ohio (a town named, aptly, Defiance) with a fierce, uninhibited way of attacking the beat, driving a band of whatever size halfway into tomorrow. The music comes out as from a flame-thrower, but with a density and momentum only suggested by even the best (of his) records".

== Sources ==
- Willard, Hal, The Wildest One (1996)
- Armstrong, Doug, Wild Bill Davison: A Celebration (Leith Music, 1991)
