= Chronological Classics discography =

Chronological Classics was a French compact disc reissue label. Gilles Pétard, the original owner, intended to release the complete master takes of all jazz and swing recordings that were issued on 78 rpm. By the time the label suspended operations in July 2008, its scope had extended to LPs.

Pétard also started the label R&B Classics to reissue postwar rhythm & blues recordings. An unaffiliated label, Neatworks, released alternate takes and misidentified master takes of jazz artists previously issued on Chronological Classics. In 1999, Chronological Classics issued a CD set that included tracks previously unavailable in the regular series and a bonus CD with corrected tracks from previous releases.

The jazz series started with number 500 and includes the following albums:

== 500 – 599 ==
- 24 Complementary Track (3 CDs)
- 99 The Classics Collection (The Classics Sampler) [VA 20 Tracks]
- 500 Ella Fitzgerald 1935–37
- 501 Jimmie Lunceford 1930–34
- 502 Chick Webb 1929–34
- 503 Count Basie 1936–38
- 504 Count Basie 1938–39
- 505 Jimmie Lunceford 1934–35
- 506 Ella Fitzgerald 1937–38
- 507 Art Tatum 1932–34
- 508 Teddy Wilson 1934–35
- 509 Louis Armstrong 1934–36
- 510 Jimmie Lunceford 1935–37
- 511 Teddy Wilson 1935–36
- 512 Louis Armstrong 1936–37
- 513 Count Basie 1939
- 514 Earl Hines 1932–34
- 515 Louis Armstrong 1937–38
- 516 Cab Calloway 1930–31
- 517 Chick Webb 1935–38
- 518 Ella Fitzgerald 1938–39
- 519 Fletcher Henderson 1937–38
- 520 Jimmie Lunceford 1937–39
- 521 Teddy Wilson 1936–37
- 522 Benny Carter 1929–33
- 523 Louis Armstrong 1938–39
- 524 Lionel Hampton 1937–38
- 525 Ella Fitzgerald 1939
- 526 Cab Calloway 1931–32
- 527 Fletcher Henderson 1934–37
- 528 Earl Hines 1934–37
- 529 Louis Armstrong 1932–33
- 530 Benny Carter 1933–36
- 531 Teddy Wilson 1937
- 532 Jimmie Lunceford 1939
- 533 Count Basie 1939 Vol. 2
- 534 Lionel Hampton 1938–39
- 535 Fletcher Henderson 1932–34
- 536 Louis Armstrong 1931–32
- 537 Cab Calloway 1932
- 538 Earl Hines 1937–39
- 539 Duke Ellington 1924–27
- 540 Henry "Red" Allen 1929–33
- 541 Benny Carter 1936
- 542 Duke Ellington 1927–28
- 543 Don Redman 1931–33
- 544 Cab Calloway 1932–34
- 545 Earl Hines 1928–32
- 546 Fletcher Henderson 1931–32
- 547 Louis Armstrong 1930–31
- 548 Teddy Wilson 1937–38
- 549 Bennie Moten 1923–27
- 550 Duke Ellington 1928
- 551 Henry "Red" Allen 1933–35
- 552 Benny Carter 1937–39
- 553 Don Redman 1933–36
- 554 Cab Calloway 1934–37
- 555 Fletcher Henderson 1931
- 556 Teddy Wilson 1938
- 557 Louis Armstrong 1929–30
- 558 Bennie Moten 1927–29
- 559 Duke Ellington 1928–29
- 560 Art Tatum 1934–40
- 561 Hot Lips Page 1938–40
- 562 Lionel Hampton 1939–40
- 563 Count Basie 1939–40
- 564 Lil Hardin Armstrong 1936–40
- 565 Jimmie Lunceford 1939–40
- 566 Ella Fitzgerald 1939–40
- 567 Earl Hines 1939–40
- 568 Cab Calloway 1937–38
- 569 Duke Ellington 1929
- 570 Louis Armstrong 1928–29
- 571 Teddy Wilson 1939
- 572 Fletcher Henderson 1927–31
- 573 Andy Kirk 1936–37
- 574 Don Redman 1936–39
- 575 Henry "Red" Allen 1935–36
- 576 Cab Calloway 1938–39
- 577 Duke Ellington 1929–30
- 578 Bennie Moten 1929–30
- 579 Benny Carter 1939–40
- 580 Fletcher Henderson 1927
- 581 Andy Kirk 1937–38
- 582 Billie Holiday 1933–37
- 583 Sidney Bechet 1923–36
- 584 Jelly-Roll Morton 1923–24
- 585 Louis Armstrong 1926–27
- 586 Duke Ellington 1930
- 587 Coleman Hawkins 1929–34
- 588 Luis Russell 1926–29
- 589 Johnny Dodds 1926
- 590 Henry "Red" Allen 1936–37
- 591 Bennie Moten 1930–32
- 592 Billie Holiday 1937–39
- 593 Sidney Bechet 1937–38
- 594 King Oliver 1930–31
- 595 Cab Calloway 1939–40
- 596 Duke Ellington 1930 Vol. 2
- 597 Fletcher Henderson 1926–27
- 598 Andy Kirk 1938
- 599 Jelly-Roll Morton 1924–26

== 600 – 699 ==
- 600 Louis Armstrong 1925–26
- 601 Billie Holiday 1939–40
- 602 Coleman Hawkins 1934–37
- 603 Johnny Dodds 1927
- 604 Jimmie Noone 1923–28
- 605 Duke Ellington 1930–31
- 606 Luis Russell 1930–34
- 607 King Oliver 1928–30
- 608 Sidney Bechet 1938–40
- 609 McKinney's Cotton Pickers 1928–29
- 610 Fletcher Henderson 1925–26
- 611 Jimmie Noone 1928–29
- 612 Jelly-Roll Morton 1926–28
- 613 Coleman Hawkins 1937–39
- 614 Cab Calloway 1940
- 615 Louis Armstrong 1939–40
- 616 Duke Ellington 1931–32
- 617 Johnny Dodds 1927–28
- 618 King Oliver 1926–28
- 619 Sidney Bechet 1940
- 620 Teddy Wilson 1939–41
- 621 Earl Hines 1941
- 622 Jimmie Lunceford 1940–41
- 623 Count Basie 1940–41
- 624 Lionel Hampton 1940–41
- 625 McKinney's Cotton Pickers 1929–30
- 626 Duke Ellington 1932–33
- 627 Jelly-Roll Morton 1928–29
- 628 Henry "Red" Allen 1937–41
- 629 Cab Calloway 1940–41
- 630 Mary Lou Williams 1927–40
- 631 Benny Carter 1940–41
- 632 Jimmie Noone 1929–30
- 633 Fletcher Henderson 1924–25
- 634 Coleman Hawkins 1939–40
- 635 Johnny Dodds 1928–40
- 636 Louis Jordan 1934–40
- 637 Duke Ellington 1933
- 638 Sidney Bechet 1940–41
- 639 King Oliver 1923–26
- 640 Andy Kirk 1939–40
- 641 Jimmie Noone 1930–34
- 642 Jelly-Roll Morton 1929–30
- 643 Frankie Newton 1937–39
- 644 Ella Fitzgerald 1940–41
- 645 Teddy Hill 1935–37
- 646 Duke Ellington 1933–35
- 647 Fletcher Henderson 1924 Vol. 3
- 648 Horace Henderson 1940 / Fletcher Henderson 1941
- 649 McKinney's Cotton Pickers 1930–31 / Don Redman 1939–40
- 650 King Oliver 1923
- 651 Jimmie Noone 1934–40
- 652 Count Basie 1941
- 653 Erskine Hawkins 1936–38
- 654 Jelly-Roll Morton 1930–39
- 655 Andy Kirk 1929–31
- 656 Pete Johnson 1938–39
- 657 Fletcher Henderson 1924 Vol. 2
- 658 James P. Johnson 1921–28
- 659 Duke Ellington 1935–36
- 660 Mills Blue Rhythm Band 1931
- 661 Tiny Parham 1926–29
- 662 Willie "The Lion" Smith 1925–37
- 663 Louis Jordan 1940–41
- 664 Fats Waller 1922–26
- 665 Pete Johnson 1939–41
- 666 Duke Ellington 1936–37
- 667 Erskine Hawkins 1938–39
- 668 Jelly-Roll Morton 1939–40
- 669 Jabbo Smith 1929–38
- 670 Harlan Leonard 1940
- 671 James P. Johnson 1928–38
- 672 Ethel Waters 1925–26
- 673 Fletcher Henderson 1924
- 674 Fats Waller 1926–27
- 675 Duke Ellington 1937
- 676 Mills Blue Rhythm Band 1931–32
- 677 Willie "The Lion" Smith 1937–38
- 678 Erskine Hawkins 1939–40
- 679 Clarence Williams 1921–24
- 680 Billie Holiday 1940–42
- 681 Andy Kirk 1940–42
- 682 Cab Calloway 1941–42
- 683 Fletcher Henderson 1923–24
- 684 Count Basie 1942
- 685 Louis Armstrong 1940–42
- 686 Mills Blue Rhythm Band 1933–34
- 687 Duke Ellington 1937 Vol. 2
- 688 Ethel Waters 1926–29
- 689 Fats Waller 1927–29
- 690 Herman Chittison 1933–41
- 691 Tiny Parham 1929–40
- 692 Willie "The Lion" Smith 1938–40
- 693 Benny Goodman 1928–31
- 694 Mezz Mezzrow 1936–39
- 695 Clarence Williams 1924–26
- 696 Sammy Price 1929–41
- 697 Fletcher Henderson 1923
- 698 Jack Teagarden 1930–34
- 699 Claude Hopkins 1932–34

== 700 – 799 ==
- 700 Duke Ellington 1938
- 701 Erskine Hawkins 1940–41
- 702 Fats Waller 1929
- 703 Django Reinhardt 1934–35
- 704 Blue Lu Barker 1938–39
- 705 Slim Gaillard 1937–38
- 706 Stuff Smith 1936–39
- 707 Eddie South 1923–37
- 708 Stéphane Grappelli 1935–40
- 709 Muggsy Spanier 1939–42
- 710 Mills Blue Rhythm Band 1934–36
- 711 James P. Johnson 1938–42
- 712 Lucky Millinder 1941–42
- 713 Mezz Mezzrow 1928–36
- 714 Alix Combelle 1935–40
- 715 Albert Ammons 1936–39
- 716 Claude Hopkins 1934–35
- 717 Duke Ellington 1938 Vol 2
- 718 Clarence Williams 1926–27
- 719 Benny Goodman 1931–33
- 720 Fats Waller 1929–34
- 721 Ethel Waters 1929–31
- 722 Meade Lux Lewis 1927–39
- 723 Boots And His Buddies 1935–37
- 724 Slim Gaillard 1939–40
- 725 Roy Eldridge 1935–40
- 726 Duke Ellington 1938 Vol. 3
- 727 Django Reinhardt 1935
- 728 Al Cooper 1938–41
- 729 Jack Teagarden 1934–39
- 730 Edgar Hayes 1937–38
- 731 Mills Blue Rhythm Band 1936–37
- 732 Fats Waller 1934–35
- 733 Claude Hopkins 1937–40
- 734 Bunny Berigan 1935–36
- 735 Ethel Waters 1931–34
- 736 Clarence Williams 1927
- 737 Eddie South 1937–41
- 738 Boots And His Buddies 1937–38
- 739 Django Reinhardt 1935–36
- 740 Jay McShann 1941–43
- 741 Louis Jordan 1941–43
- 742 Eddie Condon 1927–38
- 743 Meade Lux Lewis 1939–41
- 744 Benny Goodman 1934–35
- 745 Midge Williams 1937–38
- 746 Fats Waller 1935
- 747 Duke Ellington 1938–39
- 748 Django Reinhardt 1937
- 749 Bunny Berigan 1936–37
- 750 John Kirby 1938–39
- 751 Alix Combelle 1940–41
- 752 Clarence Williams 1927–28
- 753 Slim Gaillard 1940–42
- 754 Gene Krupa 1935–38
- 755 Ethel Waters 1935–40
- 756 Lovie Austin 1924–26
- 757 Nat King Cole 1936–40
- 758 Jack Teagarden 1939–40
- 759 Eddie Condon 1938–40
- 760 Fats Waller 1935 Vol. 2
- 761 Bessie Smith 1923
- 762 Django Reinhardt 1937 Vol. 2
- 763 Joe Marsala 1936–42
- 764 Bill Coleman 1936–38
- 765 Duke Ellington 1939
- 766 Bunny Berigan 1937
- 767 Gene Krupa 1938
- 768 Willie Bryant 1935–36
- 769 Benny Goodman 1935
- 770 John Kirby 1939–41
- 771 Clarence Williams 1928–29
- 772 Eddie Condon 1942–43
- 773 Nat King Cole 1940–41
- 774 Wingy Manone 1927–34
- 775 Ethel Waters 1923–25
- 776 Fats Waller 1935–36
- 777 Django Reinhardt 1937–38
- 778 Bix Beiderbecke 1924–27
- 779 Stéphane Grappelli 1941–43
- 780 Duke Ellington 1939 Vol. 2
- 781 Bud Freeman 1928–38
- 782 Alix Combelle 1942–43
- 783 Blanche Calloway 1925–35
- 784 Chu Berry 1937–41
- 785 Bunny Berigan 1937–38
- 786 Nat King Cole 1941–43
- 787 Bessie Smith 1923–24
- 788 Bix Beiderbecke 1927–30
- 789 Benny Goodman 1935–36
- 790 Duke Ellington 1939–40
- 791 Clarence Williams 1929
- 792 John Kirby 1941–43
- 793 Django Reinhardt 1938–39
- 794 Fletcher Henderson 1921–23
- 795 Jess Stacy 1935–39
- 796 Ethel Waters 1921–23
- 797 Fats Waller 1936
- 798 Wingy Manone 1934–35
- 799 Gene Krupa 1939

== 800 – 899 ==
- 800 Art Tatum 1940–44
- 801 Count Basie 1943–45
- 802 Erroll Garner 1944
- 803 Lionel Hampton 1942–44
- 804 Nat King Cole 1943–44
- 805 Duke Ellington 1940
- 806 Billie Holiday 1944
- 807 Coleman Hawkins 1943–44
- 808 Garland Wilson 1931–38
- 809 Hot Lips Page 1940–44
- 810 Clarence Williams 1929–30
- 811 Bud Freeman 1939–40
- 812 Bessie Smith 1924–25
- 813 Django Reinhardt 1939–40
- 814 Mary Lou Williams 1944
- 815 Bunny Berigan 1938
- 816 Fats Waller 1936–37
- 817 Benny Goodman 1936
- 818 Erroll Garner 1944 Vol. 2
- 819 Cozy Cole 1944
- 820 Duke Ellington 1940 Vol. 2
- 821 Joe Sullivan 1933–41
- 822 Willie Lewis 1932–36
- 823 Thomas Morris 1923–27
- 824 James P. Johnson 1943–44
- 825 Art Tatum 1944
- 826 Richard M. Jones 1923–27
- 827 Cootie Williams 1941–44
- 828 Wingy Manone 1935–36
- 829 Freddy Johnson 1933–39
- 830 Edmond Hall 1937–44
- 831 Django Reinhardt 1940
- 832 Clarence Williams 1930–31
- 833 Tommy Dorsey 1928–35
- 834 Gene Krupa 1939–40
- 835 James P. Johnson 1944
- 836 Benny Goodman 1936 Vol. 2
- 837 Duke Ellington 1940–41
- 838 Fats Waller 1937
- 839 Jack Teagarden 1940–41
- 840 Ella Fitzgerald 1941–44
- 841 Meade Lux Lewis 1941–44
- 842 Coleman Hawkins 1944
- 843 Bessie Smith 1925–27
- 844 Bunny Berigan 1938–42
- 845 Clarence Williams 1933
- 846 Putney Dandridge 1935–36
- 847 Willie Lewis 1936–38
- 848 Stan Kenton 1940–44
- 849 Wingy Manone 1936
- 850 Erroll Garner 1944 Vol. 3
- 851 Duke Ellington 1941
- 852 Django Reinhardt 1940–41
- 853 Richard M. Jones 1927–44
- 854 Tommy Dorsey 1935–36
- 855 Artie Shaw 1936
- 856 James P. Johnson 1944 Vol. 2
- 857 Fats Waller 1937 Vol. 2
- 858 Benny Goodman 1936–37
- 859 Gene Krupa 1940
- 860 Sidney Bechet 1941–44
- 861 Nat King Cole 1944–45
- 862 Jimmie Lunceford 1941–45
- 863 Coleman Hawkins 1944–45
- 864 Slim Gaillard 1945
- 865 Cozy Cole 1944–45
- 866 Louis Jordan 1943–45
- 867 Duke Ellington 1942–44
- 868 Erskine Hawkins 1941–45
- 869 Putney Dandridge 1936
- 870 Bessie Smith 1927–28
- 871 Clarence Williams 1933–34
- 872 Edmond Hall 1944–45
- 873 Erroll Garner 1944–45
- 874 Jack Teagarden 1941–43
- 875 Fats Waller 1937–38
- 876 Earl Hines 1942–45
- 877 Django Reinhardt 1941–42
- 878 Tommy Dorsey 1936
- 879 Benny Goodman 1937
- 880 Willie Lewis 1941
- 881 Duke Ellington 1944–45
- 882 Don Byas 1944–45
- 883 Gene Krupa 1940 Vol. 2
- 884 Buddy Johnson 1939–42
- 885 Wynonie Harris 1944–45
- 886 Artie Shaw 1936–37
- 887 Wingy Manone 1936–37
- 888 Dizzy Gillespie 1945
- 889 The Three Peppers 1937–40
- 890 Bobby Hackett 1938–40
- 891 Clarence Williams 1934
- 892 Helen Humes 1927–45
- 893 Nat King Cole 1945
- 894 Charles Brown 1944–45
- 895 Mound City Blue Blowers 1935–36
- 896 Barney Bigard 1944
- 897 Bessie Smith 1928–29
- 898 Stan Kenton 1945
- 899 Benny Goodman 1937–38

== 900 – 999 ==
- 900 Ziggy Elman 1938–39
- 901 Leonard Feather 1937–45
- 902 Joe Marsala 1944–45
- 903 Harry James 1937–39
- 904 Buster Bailey 1925–40
- 905 Django Reinhardt 1942–43
- 906 Benny Morton 1934–45
- 907 Muggsy Spanier 1944
- 908 Teddy Wilson 1942–45
- 909 George Wettling 1940–44
- 910 Don Byas 1945
- 911 Slim Gaillard 1945 Vol. 2
- 912 Kansas City 5,6 & 7 1938–44
- 913 Fats Waller 1938
- 914 Billy Eckstine 1944–45
- 915 Duke Ellington 1945
- 916 Tommy Dorsey 1936–37
- 917 Gene Krupa 1940 Vol. 3
- 918 Clarence Williams 1934–37
- 919 Billy Kyle 1937–38
- 920 Roy Eldridge 1943–44
- 921 Louis Jordan 1945–46
- 922 Lionel Hampton 1945–46
- 923 Benny Carter 1943–46
- 924 Erroll Garner 1945–46
- 925 Benny Goodman 1938
- 926 Coleman Hawkins 1945
- 927 Albert Ammons 1939–46
- 928 Louis Armstrong 1944–46
- 929 Artie Shaw 1937
- 930 Barney Bigard 1944–45
- 931 Rex Stewart 1934–46
- 932 Lester Young 1943–46
- 933 Pete Johnson 1944–46
- 934 Count Basie 1945–46
- 935 Dizzy Gillespie 1945–46
- 936 Harry James 1939
- 937 Dickie Wells 1927–43
- 938 Nat King Cole 1946
- 939 Slam Stewart 1945–46
- 940 Joe Turner 1941–46
- 941 Billy Kyle 1939–46
- 942 Bud Freeman 1945–46
- 943 Fats Waller 1938–39
- 944 Charlie Shavers 1944–45
- 945 Django Reinhardt 1944–46
- 946 Lionel Hampton 1946
- 947 Eddie Heywood 1944
- 948 Illinois Jacquet 1945–46
- 949 Stan Kenton 1946
- 950 Hot Lips Page 1944–46
- 951 Duke Ellington 1945 Vol. 2
- 952 Wingy Manone 1937–38
- 953 Clarence Williams 1937–41
- 954 Sidney Bechet 1945–46
- 955 Tommy Dorsey 1937
- 956 Johnny Guarnieri 1944–46
- 957 Ike Quebec 1944–46
- 958 Sarah Vaughan 1944–46
- 959 Don Byas 1945 Vol. 2
- 960 Gene Krupa 1941
- 961 Benny Goodman 1938 Vol. 2
- 962 Slim Gaillard 1946
- 963 Maxine Sullivan 1937–38
- 964 John Kirby 1945–46
- 965 Artie Shaw 1938
- 966 Jay McShann 1944–46
- 967 Muggsy Spanier 1944–46
- 968 Buck Clayton 1945–47
- 969 Billy Banks / Jack Bland 1932
- 970 Harry James 1939–40
- 971 Charles Brown 1946
- 972 Jonah Jones 1936–45
- 973 Fats Waller 1939
- 974 Sid Catlett 1944–46
- 975 Bud Freeman 1946
- 976 Gerald Wilson 1945–46
- 977 Bessie Smith 1929–33
- 978 Skeets Tolbert 1931–40
- 979 Cliff Jackson 1930–45
- 980 Charlie Parker 1945–47
- 981 Cootie Williams 1945–46
- 982 Art Tatum 1945–47
- 983 Roy Eldridge 1945–47
- 984 Coleman Hawkins 1946–47
- 985 Duke Ellington 1945–46
- 986 Dizzy Gillespie 1946–47
- 987 Lester Young 1946–47
- 988 Count Basie 1946–47
- 989 Sarah Vaughan 1946–47
- 990 Benny Goodman 1938–39
- 991 Maxine Sullivan 1938–41
- 992 Louis Armstrong 1946–47
- 993 Skeets Tolbert 1940–42
- 994 Lionel Hampton 1947
- 995 Tommy Dorsey 1937 Vol. 2
- 996 Cab Calloway 1942–47
- 997 Teddy Wilson 1946
- 998 Ella Fitzgerald 1945–47
- 999 Dexter Gordon 1943–47

== 1000 – 1099 ==
- 1000 Charlie Parker 1947
- 1001 Django Reinhardt 1947
- 1002 Fats Waller 1939–40
- 1003 Bud Powell 1945–47
- 1004 Erroll Garner 1946–47
- 1005 Nat King Cole 1946–47
- 1006 Gene Krupa 1941 Vol. 2
- 1007 Artie Shaw 1939
- 1008 Erskine Hawkins 1946–47
- 1009 Don Byas 1946
- 1010 Louis Jordan 1946–47
- 1011 Stan Kenton 1947
- 1012 Eddie "Lockjaw" Davis 1946–47
- 1013 Wynonie Harris 1945–47
- 1014 Harry James 1940–41
- 1015 Duke Ellington 1946
- 1016 Rex Stewart 1946–47
- 1017 Ben Webster 1944–46
- 1018 Count Basie 1947
- 1019 Illinois Jacquet 1946–47
- 1020 Maxine Sullivan 1941–46
- 1021 Mary Lou Williams 1944–45
- 1022 Billy Eckstine 1946–47
- 1023 Wingy Manone 1939–40
- 1024 Herman Chittison 1944–45
- 1025 Benny Goodman 1939
- 1026 Lucky Millinder 1943–47
- 1027 James P. Johnson 1944–45
- 1028 Spirits Of Rhythm 1933–45
- 1029 Pete Brown 1942–45
- 1030 Fats Waller 1940–41
- 1031 Nat King Cole 1947
- 1032 Jack Teagarden 1944–47
- 1033 Eddie Condon 1944–46
- 1034 Joe Turner 1946–47
- 1035 Tommy Dorsey 1937 Vol. 3
- 1036 Helen Humes 1945–47
- 1037 Trummy Young 1944–46
- 1038 Eddie Heywood 1944–46
- 1039 Stan Kenton 1947 Vol. 2
- 1040 Billie Holiday 1945–48
- 1041 Earl Hines 1945–47
- 1042 Woody Herman 1936–37
- 1043 Benny Carter 1946–48
- 1044 Charlie Ventura 1945–46
- 1045 Artie Shaw 1939 Vol. 2
- 1046 Django Reinhardt 1947 Vol. 2
- 1047 Bobby Hackett 1943–47
- 1048 Louis Prima 1934–35
- 1049 Ella Fitzgerald 1947–48
- 1050 Mary Lou Williams 1945–47
- 1051 Duke Ellington 1946–47
- 1052 Harry James 1941
- 1053 Edgar Hayes 1938–48
- 1054 Stuff Smith 1939–44
- 1055 Bob Howard 1937–47
- 1056 Gene Krupa 1941–42
- 1057 Rex Stewart 1947–48
- 1058 Howard McGhee 1948
- 1059 James P. Johnson 1945–47
- 1060 Pat Flowers 1941–45
- 1061 Mildred Bailey 1929–32
- 1062 Nat King Cole 1947 Vol. 2
- 1063 Johnny Guarnieri 1946–47
- 1064 Benny Goodman 1939 Vol. 2
- 1065 Etta Jones 1944–47
- 1066 Luis Russell 1945–46
- 1067 Henry "Red" Allen 1944–47
- 1068 Fats Waller 1941
- 1069 Kid Ory 1922–45
- 1070 Joe Sullivan 1944–45
- 1071 Arnett Cobb 1946–47
- 1072 Louis Armstrong 1947
- 1073 Don Byas 1947
- 1074 Mezz Mezzrow 1944–45
- 1075 Andy Kirk 1943–49
- 1076 Bob Howard 1936–37
- 1077 Louis Prima 1935–36
- 1078 Tommy Dorsey 1937–38
- 1079 Buddy Johnson 1942–47
- 1080 Mildred Bailey 1932–36
- 1081 Stuff Smith 1944–46
- 1082 Jimmie Lunceford 1945–47
- 1083 Sammy Price 1942–45
- 1084 Oscar Peterson 1945–47
- 1085 Red Norvo 1933–36
- 1086 Duke Ellington 1947
- 1087 Artie Shaw 1939–40
- 1088 Charles Brown 1946–47
- 1089 Howard McGhee 1946–48
- 1090 Woody Herman 1937–38
- 1091 Wingy Manone 1940–44
- 1092 Harry James 1941 Vol. 2
- 1093 Pat Flowers 1945–47
- 1094 Joe Turner 1947–48
- 1095 Mezz Mezzrow 1947
- 1096 Gene Krupa 1942–45
- 1097 Fats Waller 1942–43
- 1098 Benny Goodman 1939–40
- 1099 Buddy Rich 1946–48

== 1100 – 1199 ==
- 1100 Albert Ammons 1946–48
- 1101 Sarah Vaughan 1947–49
- 1102 Dizzy Gillespie 1947–49
- 1103 Charlie Parker 1947–49
- 1104 Art Tatum 1949
- 1105 Cootie Williams 1946–49
- 1106 Tadd Dameron 1947–49
- 1107 Count Basie 1947–49
- 1108 Fats Navarro 1947–49
- 1109 Erroll Garner 1947–49
- 1110 Pete Johnson 1947–49
- 1111 Charlie Ventura 1946–47
- 1112 Sidney Bechet 1947–49
- 1113 Lucky Thompson 1944–47
- 1114 Mildred Bailey 1937–38
- 1115 Buddy Johnson 1947–49
- 1116 James Moody 1948–49
- 1117 Tommy Dorsey 1938
- 1118 Thelonious Monk 1947–48
- 1119 Duke Ellington 1947–48
- 1120 Earl Hines 1947–49
- 1121 Bob Howard 1935–36
- 1122 Valaida Snow 1937–40
- 1123 Red Norvo 1936–37
- 1124 Babs Gonzales 1947–49
- 1125 Howard McGhee 1945–46
- 1126 Stan Getz 1946–49
- 1127 Artie Shaw 1940
- 1128 Woody Herman 1939
- 1129 New Orleans Rhythm Kings 1922–23
- 1130 Blue Lu Barker 1946–49
- 1131 Benny Goodman 1940
- 1132 Harry James 1941–42
- 1133 Charlie Barnet 1933–36
- 1134 Louis Jordan 1947–49
- 1135 Nat King Cole 1947 Vol. 3
- 1136 John Hardee 1946–48
- 1137 Billy Taylor 1945–49
- 1138 Erroll Garner 1949
- 1139 Wynonie Harris 1947–49
- 1140 Sidney Bechet 1949
- 1141 The Three Keys / Bon Bon & his Buddies 1932–33
- 1142 Billy Eckstine 1947
- 1143 Gene Krupa 1945
- 1144 Louis Armstrong 1947 Vol. 2
- 1145 Russell Jacquet 1945–49
- 1146 Louis Prima 1937–39
- 1147 Charles Brown 1947–48
- 1148 Erskine Hawkins 1947–49
- 1149 Charlie Ventura 1947–49
- 1150 New Orleans Rhythm Kings 1925–35
- 1151 Jimmie Lunceford 1948–49
- 1152 Bob Howard 1932–35
- 1153 Ella Fitzgerald 1949
- 1154 Benny Goodman 1940–41
- 1155 Nat King Cole 1947–49
- 1156 Tommy Dorsey 1938 Vol. 2
- 1157 Red Norvo 1937–38
- 1158 Valaida Snow 1933–36
- 1159 Charlie Barnet 1936–37
- 1160 Mildred Bailey 1938
- 1161 Lionel Hampton 1949–50
- 1162 Coleman Hawkins 1947–50
- 1163 Woody Herman 1939–40
- 1164 Rex Stewart 1948–49
- 1165 Dodo Marmarosa 1945–50
- 1166 Sarah Vaughan 1949–50
- 1167 Artie Shaw 1940–41
- 1168 Dizzy Gillespie 1949–50
- 1169 James Moody 1949–50
- 1170 Bud Powell 1949–50
- 1171 Kenny Clarke 1946–48
- 1172 Stan Getz 1950
- 1173 Lucky Millinder 1947–50
- 1174 Sonny Stitt 1946–50
- 1175 Jess Stacy 1944–50
- 1176 J.J. Johnson 1946–49
- 1177 Eddie Condon 1947–50
- 1178 Harry James 1942
- 1179 Louis Armstrong 1949–50
- 1180 Joe Turner 1949–50
- 1181 Gene Sedric 1938–47
- 1182 Erroll Garner 1949 Vol. 2
- 1183 Kid Ory 1945–50
- 1184 Lennie Tristano 1946–47
- 1185 Stan Kenton 1950
- 1186 Sidney Bechet 1949 Vol. 2
- 1187 Mildred Bailey 1939
- 1188 Frankie Trumbauer 1927–28
- 1189 Johnny Hodges 1945–50
- 1190 Sy Oliver 1945–49
- 1191 Duke Ellington 1949–50
- 1192 Red Norvo 193–39
- 1193 Lionel Hampton 1950
- 1194 Charlie Barnet 1937–39
- 1195 Ella Fitzgerald 1950
- 1196 Nat King Cole 1949
- 1197 Tommy Dorsey 1938–39
- 1198 Oscar Peterson 1949–50
- 1199 Hot Lips Page 1946–50

== 1200 – 1299 ==
- 1200 Jimmy Mundy 1937–47
- 1201 Louis Prima 1940–44
- 1202 Benny Goodman 1941
- 1203 Leo Parker 1947–50
- 1204 Pee Wee Russell 1935–46
- 1205 Erroll Garner 1949–50
- 1206 Artie Shaw 1941–42
- 1207 Buddy Tate 1945–50
- 1208 Bix Beiderbecke w. Paul Whiteman 1927–28
- 1209 Una Mae Carlisle 1938–41
- 1210 Charles Brown 1948–49
- 1211 Joe Venuti 1926–28
- 1212 Red Nichols 1925–27
- 1213 Pearl Bailey 1944–47
- 1214 Kenny Clarke 1948–50
- 1215 Charlie Ventura 1949
- 1216 Frankie Trumbauer 1928–29
- 1217 Duke Ellington 1950
- 1218 Gerald Wiggins 1950
- 1219 Eddie Heywood 1946–47
- 1220 Billie Holiday 1949–51
- 1221 Slim Gaillard 1947–51
- 1222 Charlie Parker 1950
- 1223 Sidney Bechet 1949 Vol. 3
- 1224 Teddy Wilson 1947–50
- 1225 Mildred Bailey 1939–40
- 1226 Charlie Barnet 1939
- 1227 Harry James 1942–44
- 1228 Count Basie 1950–51
- 1229 Willie "The Lion" Smith 1944–49
- 1230 Una Mae Carlisle 1941–44
- 1231 Gene Krupa 1945–46
- 1232 Red Norvo 1939–43
- 1233 Louis Armstrong 1950–51
- 1234 Al Hibbler 1946–49
- 1235 Bix Beiderbecke w. Paul Whiteman 1928–29
- 1236 Benny Goodman 1941 Vol. 2
- 1237 Tommy Dorsey 1939
- 1238 Louis Jordan 1950–51
- 1239 Don Byas 1947–51
- 1240 Erroll Garner 1950
- 1241 Red Nichols 1927–28
- 1242 Artie Shaw 1942–45
- 1243 Woody Herman 1940
- 1244 Buddy Johnson 1950–51
- 1245 Frankie Trumbauer 1929–31
- 1246 Joe Venuti 1928–30
- 1247 Lester Young 1947–51
- 1248 Johnny Hodges 1950–51
- 1249 Ethel Waters 1946–47
- 1250 Oscar Peterson 1950
- 1251 Gene Ammons 1947–49
- 1252 Cleo Brown 1935–51
- 1253 Ben Webster 1946–51
- 1254 Illinois Jacquet 1947–51
- 1255 Stan Kenton 1950–51
- 1256 Bill Coleman 1940–49
- 1257 Erskine Hawkins 1950–51
- 1258 Duke Ellington 1950–51
- 1259 Roy Eldridge 1950–51
- 1260 Mary Lou Williams 1949–51
- 1261 Ella Fitzgerald 1951
- 1262 Lionel Hampton 1950–51
- 1263 James Moody 1950–51
- 1264 Wardell Gray 1946–50
- 1265 Una Mae Carlisle 1944–50
- 1266 Charlie Barnet 1939–40
- 1267 The Red Heads 1925–27
- 1268 Harry James 1944–45
- 1269 Miff Mole 1927
- 1270 Red Nichols 1928–29
- 1271 Benny Goodman 1941 Vol. 3
- 1272 Charles Brown 1949–51
- 1273 Louis Prima 1944–45
- 1274 Anita O'Day 1945–50
- 1275 Frankie Trumbauer 1932–36
- 1276 Joe Venuti 1930–33
- 1277 Artie Shaw 1945
- 1278 Tommy Dorsey 1939 Vol. 2
- 1279 Mildred Bailey 1940–42
- 1280 Sidney Bechet 1950
- 1281 Count Basie 1952
- 1282 Duke Ellington 1951
- 1283 Louis Armstrong 1951–52
- 1284 Rex Stewart 1949
- 1285 Billie Holiday 1952
- 1286 Dizzy Gillespie 1951–52
- 1287 Cab Calloway 1949–55
- 1288 Earl Hines 1949–52
- 1289 Wynonie Harris 1950–52
- 1290 Lennie Tristano 1947–51
- 1291 Sonny Stitt 1950–51
- 1292 Stan Kenton 1951
- 1293 Pearl Bailey 1947–50
- 1294 Howard McGhee 1949–52
- 1295 Dexter Gordon 1947–52
- 1296 Sarah Vaughan 1951–52
- 1297 Benny Carter 1948–52
- 1298 Miff Mole 1928–37
- 1299 Stan Getz 1951

== 1300 – 1399 ==
- 1300 Al Hibbler 1950–52
- 1301 Jimmy Jones 1946–47
- 1302 Mezz Mezzrow 1947–51
- 1303 Benny Goodman 1941–42
- 1304 Woody Herman 1940–41
- 1305 Nat King Cole 1949–50
- 1306 Red Norvo 1943–44
- 1307 Budd Johnson 1944–52
- 1308 Hazel Scott 1939–45
- 1309 Charlie Ventura 1949–51
- 1310 Erroll Garner 1950–51
- 1311 Roy Eldridge 1951
- 1312 Louisiana Rhythm Kings 1929–30
- 1313 Harry James 1945–46
- 1314 Charlie Parker 1951–52
- 1315 Don Byas 1951–52
- 1316 Mildred Bailey 1943–45
- 1317 Django Reinhardt 1947–51
- 1318 Charlie Barnet 1940
- 1319 Gene Krupa 1947–49
- 1320 Duke Ellington 1952
- 1321 Dizzy Gillespie 1952
- 1322 Georgie Auld 1940–45
- 1323 Oscar Peterson 1950–52
- 1324 Benny Goodman 1942
- 1325 Lester Young 1951–52
- 1326 Sidney Bechet 1950–51
- 1327 Tommy Dorsey 1939 Vol. 3
- 1328 Ella Fitzgerald 1952
- 1329 Gene Ammons 1949–50
- 1330 Artie Shaw 1945–46
- 1331 Frankie Trumbauer 1936–46
- 1332 Red Nichols 1929
- 1333 Helen Humes 1948–50
- 1334 Herman Chittison 1945–50
- 1335 Benny Goodman 1942–44
- 1336 Anita O'Day 1950–52
- 1337 Mildred Bailey 1945–47
- 1338 Stan Getz 1951–52
- 1339 Bill Coleman 1951–52
- 1340 Coleman Hawkins 1950–53
- 1341 Erroll Garner 1951–52
- 1342 Hot Lips Page 1950–53
- 1343 Valaida Snow 1940–53
- 1344 Billy Taylor 1950–52
- 1345 Benny Goodman 1944–45
- 1346 Mary Lou Williams 1951–53
- 1347 Dizzy Gillespie 1952–53
- 1348 Joe Venuti 1933
- 1349 Willie "The Lion" Smith 1950
- 1350 Duke Ellington 1952–53
- 1351 Georgie Auld 1945–46
- 1352 Louis Armstrong 1952–53
- 1353 Joe Sullivan 1945–53
- 1354 Eddie Condon 1951–53
- 1355 Benny Goodman 1945
- 1356 Red Norvo 1944–45
- 1357 Eddie Lang 1927–32
- 1358 Sidney Bechet 195–52
- 1359 Gene Krupa 1949–51
- 1360 Eddie Heywood 1950–51
- 1361 Oscar Peterson 1952
- 1362 Buck Clayton 1949–53
- 1363 Charlie Ventura 1951–53
- 1364 Teddy Wilson 1952–53
- 1365 Sy Oliver 1949–52
- 1366 Benny Goodman 1945 Vol. 2
- 1367 Gene Ammons 1950–51
- 1368 Artie Shaw 1946–50
- 1369 Red Nichols 1929–30
- 1370 Erroll Garner 1952–53
- 1371 Georgie Auld 1946–51
- 1372 Don Byas 1952
- 1373 Bud Powell 1951–53
- 1374 Louis Prima 1945
- 1375 Benny Goodman 1946
- 1376 Illinois Jacquet 1951–52
- 1377 Glenn Miller 1935–38
- 1378 Sonny Stitt 1951–53
- 1379 Stan Getz 1952–53
- 1380 Dizzy Gillespie 1953
- 1381 Bill Coleman 1952–53
- 1382 Eddie "Lockjaw" Davis 1948–52
- 1383 Billy Taylor 1952–53
- 1384 Sidney Bechet 1952
- 1385 Benny Goodman 1946–47
- 1386 Red Norvo 1945–47
- 1387 Count Basie 1952–53
- 1388 James Moody 1951
- 1389 Johnny Hodges 1951–52
- 1390 Gene Krupa 1952–53
- 1391 Erroll Garner 1953
- 1392 Willie "The Lion" Smith 1950–53
- 1393 Mezz Mezzrow 1951–53
- 1394 Buck Clayton 1953
- 1395 Stan Getz 1953
- 1396 Benny Goodman 1947
- 1397 Artie Shaw 1950
- 1398 Duke Ellington 1953
- 1399 Oscar Peterson 1952 Vol. 2

== 1400 – 1499 ==
- 1400 Benny Carter 1952–54
- 1401 Meade Lux Lewis 1946–54
- 1402 Louis Armstrong 1954
- 1403 Bobby Hackett 1948–54
- 1404 Ella Fitzgerald 1953–54
- 1405 Muggsy Spanier 1949–54
- 1406 Gene Ammons 1951–53
- 1407 Benny Goodman 1947 Vol. 2
- 1408 Charlie Parker 1952–54
- 1409 Oscar Pettiford 1951–54
- 1410 James Moody 1951–54
- 1411 Art Tatum 1949–53
- 1412 Wingy Manone 1944–46
- 1413 Artie Shaw 1951–54
- 1414 Don Byas 1952–53
- 1415 Beryl Booker 1946–52
- 1416 Coleman Hawkins 1953–54
- 1417 Mary Lou Williams 1953–54
- 1418 Benny Goodman 1947–48
- 1419 Buddy Rich 1950–55
- 1420 Tyree Glenn 1947–52
- 1421 Johnny Hodges 1952–54
- 1422 Red Norvo 1950–51
- 1423 Erroll Garner 1953–54
- 1424 Dizzy Gillespie 1953–54
- 1425 Benny Goodman 1948–49
- 1426 Oscar Peterson 1952 Vol. 3
- 1427 Buck Clayton 1953 Vol. 2
- 1428 Stan Kenton 1951–52
- 1429 Lionel Hampton 1951–53
- 1430 Thelonious Monk 1951–52
- 1431 Sidney Bechet 1952 Vol. 2
- 1432 Duke Ellington 1953 Vol. 2
- 1433 Gene Krupa 1953–54
- 1434 Joe Bushkin 1940–46
- 1435 Stan Getz 1954
- 1436 Benny Goodman 1949–51
- 1437 Slim Gaillard 1951–53
- 1438 Benny Carter 1954
- 1439 Charlie Barnet 1940 Vol. 2
- 1440 Earl Hines 1953–54
- 1441 Django Reinhardt 1951–53
- 1442 Beryl Booker 1953–54
- 1443 Eddie "Lockjaw" Davis 1953–55
- 1444 Gerald Wilson 1946–54
- 1445 Buddy DeFranco 1949–52
- 1446 Count Basie 1953–54
- 1447 Erroll Garner 1954
- 1448 Hazel Scott 1946–47
- 1449 Mezz Mezzrow 1953–54
- 1450 Benny Goodman 1951–52
- 1451 Illinois Jacquet 1953–55
- 1452 Bud Powell 1953–54
- 1453 Jess Stacy 1951–56
- 1454 Oscar Pettiford 1954–55
- 1455 Harry James 1946–47
- 1456 Oscar Peterson 1952–53
- 1457 Ella Fitzgerald 1954–55
- 1458 Ben Webster 1953–54
- 1459 Joe Bushkin 1947–50
- 1460 Lucky Millinder 1951–60
- 1461 Stan Kenton 1952–53
- 1462 Red Nichols 1930–31
- 1463 Wardell Gray 1950–55
- 1464 Eddie Condon 1954–55

The following numbers were slated for an August 2008 release but were never issued:

- 1465 Benny Goodman 1952–54
- 1466 Sonny Rollins 1951–54
- 1467 Buddy DeFranco 1952–53
- 1468 Pearl Bailey 1950–53
- 1469 Tommy Dorsey 1939–40

== R&B Classics ==
The R&B Classics series started out at No. 5000 with a total of 190 being released before the company closed.

R&B Classics

- 5000 Ray Charles 1949–50
- 5001 Marion Abernathy 1947–49
- 5002 Dave Bartholomew 1947–50
- 5003 Ruth Brown 1949–50
- 5004 Professor Longhair 1949
- 5005 Earl Bostic 1945–48
- 5006 Tom Archia 1947–48
- 5007 T-Bone Walker 1929–46
- 5008 Muddy Waters 1941–47
- 5009 Big Jay McNeely 1948–50
- 5010 Walter Brown 1945–47
- 5011 Tiny Bradshaw 1934–47
- 5012 Sticks McGhee 1947–51
- 5013 Sunnyland Slim 1947–48
- 5014 Lightnin' Hopkins 1946–48
- 5015 Ivory Joe Hunter 1945–47
- 5016 Lloyd Glenn 1947–50
- 5017 Eddie Vinson 1945–47
- 5018 Amos Milburn 1946–47
- 5019 Todd Rhodes 1947–49
- 5020 Joe Liggins 1944–46
- 5021 Roy Brown 1947–49
- 5022 Earl Bostic 1948–49
- 5023 Lightnin' Hopkins 1948
- 5024 Crown Prince Waterford 1946–50
- 5025 Fats Domino 1949–51
- 5026 Ivory Joe Hunter 1947
- 5027 Johnny Otis 1945–47
- 5028 Andrew Tibbs 1947–51
- 5029 Muddy Waters 1948–50
- 5030 Clarence "Gatemouth" Brown 1947–51
- 5031 Tiny Bradshaw 1949–51
- 5032 Milt Buckner 1946–51
- 5033 T-Bone Walker 1947
- 5034 Freddie Mitchell 1949–50
- 5035 Sunnyland Slim 1949–51
- 5036 Roy Brown 1950–51
- 5037 Buster Bennett 1945–47
- 5038 Walter Brown 1947–51
- 5039 Earl Bostic 1949–51
- 5040 Todd Rhodes 1950–51
- 5041 Roy Milton 1945–46
- 5042 Eddie Vinson 1947–49
- 5043 Jim Wynn 1945–46
- 5044 Lowell Fulson 1946–47
- 5045 Lightnin' Hopkins 1948–49
- 5046 Billy Wright 1949–51
- 5047 Amos Milburn 1947
- 5048 Tiny Grimes 1944–49
- 5049 Ivory Joe Hunter 1947–50
- 5050 Ray Charles 1950–52
- 5051 Jimmy Witherspoon 1947–48
- 5052 Sugar Chile Robinson 1949–52
- 5053 B.B. King 1949–52
- 5054 Bull Moose Jackson 1945–47
- 5055 Dave Bartholomew 1950–52
- 5056 Howlin' Wolf 1951–52
- 5057 Joe Morris 1946–49
- 5058 Big Jay McNeely 1951–52
- 5059 Little Miss Cornshucks 1947–51
- 5060 Fats Domino 1951–52
- 5061 Dud And Paul Bascomb 1945–47
- 5062 Jimmy McCracklin 1945–48
- 5063 Joe Liggins 1946–48
- 5064 Saunders King 1942–48
- 5065 Chris Powell 1949–52
- 5066 Little Esther 1951–52
- 5067 Johnny Otis 1949–50
- 5068 Mabel Scott 1938–50
- 5069 Lloyd Glenn 1951–52
- 5070 Jim Wynn 1947–59
- 5071 Lowell Fulson 1947–48
- 5072 Lil Green 1940–41
- 5073 Hal Singer 1948–51
- 5074 T-Bone Walker 1947–50
- 5075 Joe Lutcher 1947
- 5076 Sherman Williams 1947–51
- 5077 Amos Milburn 1948–49
- 5078 Big Bill Broonzy 1949–51
- 5079 Lightnin' Hopkins 1949–50
- 5080 Jimmy Witherspoon 1948–49
- 5081 King Perry 1945–49
- 5082 Elmore James 1951–53
- 5083 Jo Jo Adams 1946–53
- 5084 Ruth Brown 1951–53
- 5085 Jimmy Rushing 1946–53
- 5086 John Brim 1950–53
- 5087 Ace Harris 1937–52
- 5088 Big Mama Thornton 1950–53
- 5089 Big Maybelle 1944–53
- 5090 Roy Brown 1951–53
- 5091 Little Walter 1947–53
- 5092 Terry Timmons 1950–53
- 5093 Earl Bostic 1952–53
- 5094 Sonny Boy Williamson 1951–53
- 5095 Fats Domino 1953
- 5096 Annisteen Allen 1945–53
- 5097 Bill Doggett 1952–53
- 5098 Howlin' Wolf 1952–53
- 5099 Lil Green 1942–46
- 5100 Lloyd Price 1952–53
- 5101 Big Bill Broonzy 1951
- 5102 Johnny Otis 1950
- 5103 T. J. Fowler 1948–53
- 5104 Paula Watson 1948–53
- 5105 Bull Moose Jackson 1947–50
- 5106 Tiny Grimes 1949–51
- 5107 Mabel Scott 1951–55
- 5108 Joe Liggins 1948–50
- 5109 Muddy Waters 1950–52
- 5110 Jimmy McCracklin 1948–51
- 5111 Sarah McLawler 1950–53
- 5112 Bill Samuels 1945–47
- 5113 Ivory Joe Hunter 1950–51
- 5114 Percy Mayfield 1947–51
- 5115 The Clovers 1950–53
- 5116 Effie Smith 1945–53
- 5117 Amos Milburn 1950–51
- 5118 T-Bone Walker 1950–52
- 5119 Julia Lee 1927–46
- 5120 Billy Ward and his Dominoes 1950–53
- 5121 Charlie Singleton 1949–53
- 5122 Lowell Fulson 1948–49
- 5123 Martha Davis 1946–51
- 5124 Big Bill Broonzy 1951–52
- 5125 Joe Morris 1950–53
- 5126 LaVern Baker 1949–54
- 5127 Clarence "Gatemouth" Brown 1952–54
- 5128 J.B. Lenoir 1951–54
- 5129 King Perry 1950–54
- 5130 Floyd Jones 1948–53
- 5131 Lil Green 1947–51
- 5132 Hank Ballard & The Midnighters: The Royals 1952–54
- 5133 Lightnin' Hopkins 1950–51
- 5134 Ray Charles 1953–54
- 5135 Willis "Gator" Jackson 1950–54
- 5136 Lula Reed 1951–54
- 5137 Leroy Foster 1948–52
- 5138 Johnny Ace 1951–54
- 5139 Guitar Slim 1951–54
- 5140 Otis Blackwell 1952–54
- 5141 Faye Adams 1952–54
- 5142 Clyde McPhatter & The Drifters 1953–54
- 5143 James Crawford 1953–54
- 5144 Julia Lee 1947
- 5145 Larry Darnell 1949–51
- 5146 Tiny Grimes 1951–54
- 5147 Little Esther 1952–53
- 5148 B.B. King 1952–53
- 5149 Saunders King 1948–54
- 5150 Percy Mayfield 1951–54
- 5151 Titus Turner 1949–54
- 5152 T-Bone Walker 1952–54
- 5153 Lonnie Johnson 1949–52
- 5154 Willie Mabon 1949–54
- 5155 Joe Liggins 1950–52
- 5156 Bull Moose Jackson 1950–53
- 5157 J.T. Brown 1950–54
- 5158 Amos Milburn 1952–53
- 5159 Todd Rhodes 1952–54
- 5160 The Hawks - The Bees 1953–54
- 5161 Tommy Ridgley 1949–54
- 5162 Johnny Otis 1951
- 5163 Johnny Sparrow 1949–55
- 5164 Lowell Fulson 1949–51
- 5165 Jimmy Witherspoon 1950–51
- 5166 Smiley Lewis 1947–52
- 5167 Little Junior Parker 1952–55
- 5168 Sticks McGhee 1951–59
- 5169 Dave Bartholomew 1952–55
- 5170 Big Jay McNeely 1953–55
- 5171 Sunnyland Slim 1952–55
- 5172 Johnny "Guitar" Watson 1952–55
- 5173 Viviane Greene 1947–55
- 5174 Earl King 1953–55
- 5175 Bill Doggett 1954
- 5176 Ike Turner 1951–54
- 5177 Lonnie Johnson 1948–49
- 5178 Billy Ward 1953–54
- 5179 Earl Bostic 1954–55
- 5180 Jimmy McCracklin 1951–54
- 5181 Ruth Brown 1954–56
- 5182 Rusty Bryant 1952–54
- 5183 Little Walter 1953–55
- 5184 J.B. Lenoir 1955–56
- 5185 Stomp Gordon 1952–56
- 5186 LaVern Baker 1955–57
- 5187 Lloyd Glenn 1954–57
- 5188 Sonny Boy Williamson 1953–56
- 5189 Lonnie Johnson 1947–48
