= Gjon Mili =

Albanian-American photographer (1904–1984)

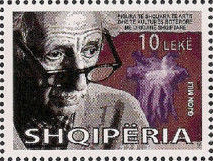
- Mili on a 2008 Albanian stamp
- Born: November 28, 1904; Korçë, Ottoman Empire (today Albania)
- Died: February 14, 1984 (aged 79); Stamford, Connecticut, U.S.
- Known for: Photography

Gjon Mili (November 28, 1904 – February 14, 1984) was an Albanian photographer from Korçë who developed his profession in America, best known for his work published in Life, in which he photographed artists such as Pablo Picasso.

== Biography ==
Gjon Mili was born to Vasil Mili and Viktori Cekani in Korçë, in the Manastir Vilayet of the Ottoman Empire (present-day Albania). Mili spent his childhood in Romania, attending Gheorghe Lazăr National College in Bucharest, and migrating to the United States in 1923. In 1939, Mili started to work as a photographer for Life (a position he held until he died in 1984). Over the years his assignments took him to the Riviera (Picasso); to Prades, France (Pau Casals in exile); to Israel (Adolf Eichmann in prison ); to Florence, Athens, Dublin, Berlin, Venice, Rome, and to Hollywood to photograph celebrities and artists, sports events, concerts, sculptures and architecture.

Working with Harold Eugene Edgerton of MIT, Gjon Mili was a pioneer in the use of stroboscopic instruments to capture a sequence of actions in one photograph. Trained as an engineer and self-taught in photography, Gjon Mili was one of the first to use electronic flash and stroboscopic light to create photographs that had more than scientific interest. Many of his images revealed the intricacy and flow of movement too rapid or complex for the naked eye to discern. In the mid-1940s, he was an assistant to the photographer Edward Weston.

In 1944, he directed the short film Jammin' the Blues, which was made at Warner Bros., and features performances by Lester Young, Red Callender, Harry Edison, "Big" Sid Catlett, Illinois Jacquet, Barney Kessel, Jo Jones and Marie Bryant. Mili did not serve as cinematographer for the film (Robert Burks did) but the film used multiplied images that in many ways recall the multi-image still-frames done with the strobe. The imaginative use of the camera makes this film a minor landmark in the way that musicians have been filmed.

Over the course of more than four decades, thousands of his pictures were published by Life as well as other publications.

Mili died of pneumonia in Stamford, Connecticut, at the age of 79.
