= Sid Catlett 1944–1946 =

Compilation album by Sid Catlett
- Released: 1998
- Recorded: 1944–1946
- Genre: Jazz
- Length: 1:21:28
- Label: Classics Records / Chronological Classics; 974

Sid Catlett 1944–1946 is a compilation album by jazz drummer Sid Catlett. It was recorded during 1944 to 1946, and was released in 1998 by the French label Classics Records as part of their Chronological Classics series. On the album, Catlett is heard in ensembles of varying size and instrumentation.

== Reception ==
Professional ratings
Review scores
Source	Rating
AllMusic	3/5 stars
The Penguin Guide to Jazz	3.5/4 stars
Tom Hull – on the Web	A−

In a review for AllMusic, Cub Koda stated that Catlett's "sense of time was impeccable and his soloing always flowed from the most musical of impulses," and wrote: "these are delightful recordings in a variety of settings that show off the versatility and innate musicality of Catlett's swinging ways."

The authors of The Penguin Guide to Jazz Recordings commented: "This hotchpotch of small-group dates... is fascinating... Sid's mercurial style, with glistening cymbal work, unexpected rimshot fusillades and detailed snare rhythms, was among the very few swing-based methods that didn't sound passé in the bop era."

Writing for Jazz Times, Harvey Pekar noted that the album contains "late swing era stuff with some bop influence," and commented: "The great Catlett was among the first jazz drummers to emphasize tasteful, restrained, musical playing. During his solos you can sometimes hear a relationship between his work and the theme."

== Track listing ==
Esquire Metropolitan Opera House Jam Session:

1. "Rose Room" – 5:56

Big Sid Catlett Quartet Featuring Ben Webster:

2. "Sleep" – 3:34
3. "Linger Awhile" – 3:10
4. "Memories of You" – 3:48
5. "Just a Riff" – 4:01

Sid Catlett Quartet:

6. "1-2-3 Blues" – 3:13

Sid Catlett Trio:

7. "I Found a New Baby" – 2:45

Ed Hall and the Big City Jazzmen:

8. "Blues in Room 920" – 3:17
9. "Sweet Georgia Brown" – 2:46

Sid Catlett and the Regis All Stars:

10. "Blue Skies" – 3:10

Sid Catlett and the Big City Jazzmen:

11. "Blue Skies" – 3:11
12. "Thermodynamics" – 3:04

Big Sid Catlett's Band:

13. "I Never Knew" – 2:57
14. "Love for Scale" – 3:09
15. "Just You, Just Me" – 2:49
16. "Henderson Stomp" – 2:43

Al Casey and his Sextet:

17. "Sometimes I'm Happy" – 2:57
18. "How High the Moon" – 2:43

Sid Catlett and his All Stars:

19. "Organ Boogie" – 2:32
20. "Organ Blues" – 3:33
21. "Sherry Wine Blues" – 3:23
22. "Open the Door Richard" – 2:58
23. "Shirley's Boogie" – 2:35
24. "Humoresque Boogie" – 2:39

== Personnel ==
- Sid Catlett – drums
- Barney Bigard – clarinet (track 1)
- Edmond Hall – clarinet (tracks 8–10)
- Bull Moose Jackson – alto saxophone (tracks 13–16)
- Willie Smith – alto saxophone (tracks 17–18)
- Ben Webster – tenor saxophone (tracks 2–6)
- Bumps Myers – tenor saxophone (tracks 13–16)
- Eddie "Lockjaw" Davis – tenor saxophone (track 21)
- Frank Socolow – tenor saxophone (tracks 8–12)
- Illinois Jacquet – tenor saxophone (tracks 13–18)
- Charlie Shavers – trumpet (tracks 8–12)
- Gerald Wilson – trumpet (tracks 17–18)
- Joe Guy – trumpet (tracks 13–16)
- Al Casey – guitar (tracks 1, 13–18)
- Jimmy Shirley – guitar (tracks 19, 21–24)
- Bill Gooden – organ (tracks 19–20)
- Art Tatum – piano (track 1)
- Eddie Heywood – piano (tracks 8–12)
- Horace Henderson – piano (tracks 13–18)
- Marlowe Morris – piano (tracks 2–7)
- Pete Johnson – piano (tracks 19–24)
- Gene Ramey – bass (tracks 21–24)
- John Simmons – bass (tracks 2–7, 13–18)
- Oscar Pettiford – bass (tracks 1, 8–12)
