= Midnight Symphony =

1944 jazz standard

Midnight Symphony is a 1944 jazz standard by Lester Young. A slow blues, it was originally recorded in the key of B-flat major and is noted for its classic blues piano phrasing by Marlowe Morris, mellow tenor sax soloing by Young, and trumpet soloing by Harry Edison. "Midnight Symphony", along with "On the Sunny Side of the Street", was included in the film of that year, Jammin' the Blues, which features Young performing the songs in a May 1944 jam with Red Callender, Harry Edison, Marlowe Morris, Sid Catlett, Barney Kessel and numerous others. Many of them performed it together in clubs that year, including the Palm Club of Los Angeles.
