= The Drum Battle =

Live album by Gene Krupa and Buddy Rich
- Released: 1960
- Recorded: September 13, 1952
- Venue: Carnegie Hall, New York City
- Genre: Jazz
- Label: Verve MG V-8369
- Producer: Norman Granz

Gene Krupa chronology
The Gene Krupa Story (1959)	The Drum Battle (1960)	Chicago...And All That Jazz! (1961)

Buddy Rich chronology
The Driver (1960)	The Drum Battle (1960)	Playtime (1961)

The Drum Battle – Gene Krupa and Buddy Rich at JATP (later issued as The Original Drum Battle!) is a 1960 live album by drummers Gene Krupa and Buddy Rich, recorded at a Jazz at the Philharmonic concert at Carnegie Hall in 1952.

== Reception ==
Professional ratings
Review scores
Source	Rating
Allmusic	4/5 stars
The Penguin Guide to Jazz Recordings	3/4 stars

Lindsay Planer writing on Allmusic wrote of the opening tracks that "While Smith drives the band, Krupa is front and center with his antagonistic percussive prodding. 'Idaho' is marked with Jones' rollicking post-bop mastery as he trades solos with Smith and can be heard quoting lines from Monk before yielding to Smith. The cover of Duke Ellington's 'Sophisticated Lady' sparkles from beginning to end. Jones' opening flourish sets the tenure as Smith settles into a smoky lead, containing some nice syncopation and regal augmentation from Jones. ...The tempo is significantly stepped up on a cover of Benny Goodman's 'Flying Home,' which is full of high-spirited playing and garners a sizable reaction from the audience." Planer described Fitzgerald's performance on "Perdido" as "hot steppin' and definitive" and said it featured "authority, class, and most of all, soul". Rich and Krupa's performance on The Drum Battle was described by Planer as a "mile-a-minute wash of profound percussion".

== Track listing ==
1. "Idaho" (Jesse Stone) – 7:26
2. "Sophisticated Lady" (Duke Ellington, Irving Mills, Mitchell Parish) – 4:35
3. "Flying Home" (Benny Goodman, Lionel Hampton) – 6:02
4. "Drum Boogie" (Gene Krupa, Roy Eldridge) – 9:20
5. "The Drum Battle" (Norman Shrudlu) – 3:20
6. "Perdido" (Ervin Drake, Hans J. Langsfelder, Juan Tizol) – 3:30

== Personnel ==
- Gene Krupa – drums
- Buddy Rich – drums
- Roy Eldridge – trumpet
- Charlie Shavers – trumpet
- Benny Carter – alto saxophone
- Flip Phillips – tenor saxophone
- Lester Young – tenor saxophone
- Hank Jones – piano
- Oscar Peterson – piano
- Barney Kessel – guitar
- Ray Brown – double bass
- Ella Fitzgerald – vocals

=== Production ===
- Leonard Feather – liner notes
- Chuck Stewart – photography
- Norman Granz – record producer
