= Tommy Turk =

American jazz trombonist (1927–1981)

Background information
- Born: Thomas Eugene Turk; July 2, 1927; Johnstown, Pennsylvania, U.S.
- Died: August 4, 1981 (aged 54) Las Vegas, Nevada, U.S.
- Genres: Jazz
- Occupation: Musician
- Instrument: Trombone

Thomas Eugene Turk (July 2, 1927 – August 4, 1981) was an American jazz trombonist.

== Early life ==
Thomas Eugene Turk was born in Johnstown, Pennsylvania on July 2, 1927. His father, Joseph, was a coal miner and self-taught trumpeter. Tommy got his first trombone when he was in fourth grade of school. His elder brother, Rob, was also a trumpeter. The three of them played in a band with two neighbors, and Tommy developed some fast-playing technique when playing polkas in the band. He had further musical experience in the Conemaugh High School band, and graduated from the same school in 1944. The brothers then continued playing together in a University of Michigan campus band, but Tommy soon joined the army, where he also led bands.

== Later life and career ==
Turk left the army and then moved to Pittsburgh, Pennsylvania, in 1947. He became established there as part of the Deuces Wild quintet. Their playing helped Turk develop a reputation, and when promoter Norman Granz heard him play, he invited Turk to appear with his touring group of major jazz figures when they performed at the Syria Mosque in Pittsburgh. His appearance was a success, and Granz recruited Turk to play in Chicago, and for several months in 1948 as part of Jazz at the Philharmonic.

Turk can be heard on several CDs with Charlie Parker. In 1949 he was a member of Flip Phillips and His Orchestra, together with John D'Agostino, Buddy Morrow, Kai Winding, Sonny Criss, Mickey Crane, Ray Brown and Shelly Manne, and on December 1, 1949, he led a group including Ray Brown and Buddy Rich that recorded four tunes under the name "Tommy Turk and His Orchestra". Nevertheless, he decided to stay in Pittsburgh, where he could control what he played and enjoyed life – in the 1950s he continued playing with Deuces Wild.

In 1954, The Pittsburgh Press reported that Turk was considering leaving the area because his annual earnings of less than $5,500 from leading Deuces Wild were inadequate. At the time, he had a wife, Mary, and two sons – Tommy Turk Jr, aged three, and Charles, aged two.

Turk also recorded with Billie Holiday, Ella Fitzgerald and Flip Phillips around the same time. In 1972, he performed at the Pittsburgh Jazz Festival with a band led by Roy Eldridge.

For many years Turk led a quartet that played at the Point View Hotel in Brentwood, Pennsylvania. He later moved to Las Vegas, to play in house bands. The Brentwood band reformed in 1976, and later recorded the album The-Truth!!! as a quintet.

== Death ==
Years later, Turk was living and performing in Las Vegas. On August 4, 1981, he was fatally shot by robbers at a tavern in that city. The Pittsburgh Press reported that Turk was "shot in the head for no apparent reason as he and other patrons lay on the floor of a tavern liquor store during a holdup." One eyewitness reported that Turk had difficulty lying flat and did not take out his wallet quickly enough for the killer. Four gang members were charged in relation to the killing. The 15-year-old who shot Turk was made eligible for parole in 2005. Turk, who was 53, was survived by his wife and two sons.

== Discography ==
=== As leader ===
==== Album ====
- The-Truth!!! Asterik. Recorded in concert, June 23, 1977

==== Singles ====
- "Two By Four" / "Encore" Mercury. Recorded December 1, 1949
- "Bye Bye Blues" / "The Beat" Mercury. Recorded December 1, 1949

=== As sideman ===
With Jazz at the Philharmonic

- 1949 Jazz at the Philharmonic (Verve, 1949)
- Carnegie Hall 1949 (Pablo, 1949)

== See also ==
- List of homicides in Nevada
