= Norman Granz =

American jazz record producer, concert promoter, and label owner (1918–2001)

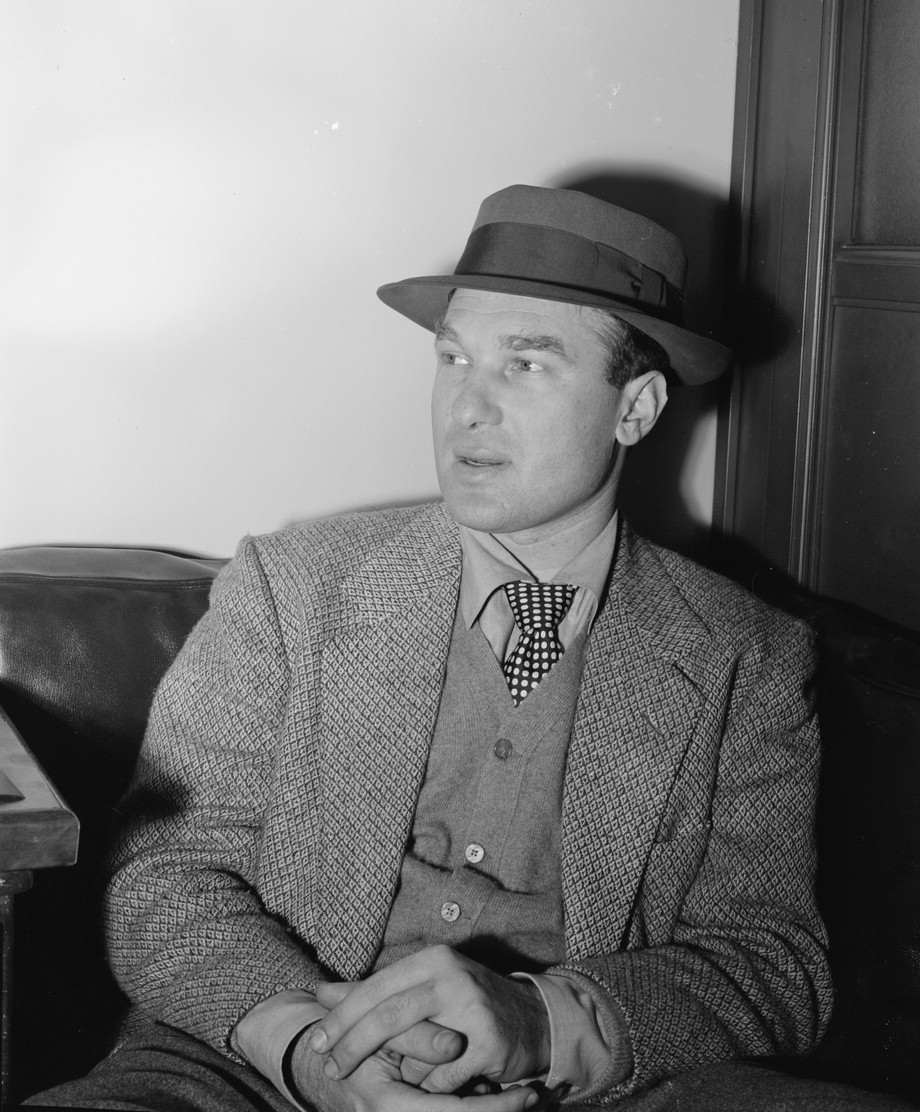
- Granz in 1947; by William P. Gottlieb
- Born: August 6, 1918; Boyle Heights, Los Angeles, California
- Died: November 22, 2001 (aged 83); Geneva, Switzerland
- Occupations: Record producer; concert promoter; label owner
- Years active: 1944–2001
- Known for: Jazz at the Philharmonic
- Spouse: Loretta Sullivan (m. 1950; div. 1955) Hannelore Granz (m. 1965, separated) Grete Lyngby (m. 1974)
- Children: 1
- Musical career
- Genre: Jazz
- Labels: Clef; Norgran; Down Home; Verve; Pablo

Norman Granz (August 6, 1918 – November 22, 2001) was an American jazz record producer and concert promoter. He founded the record labels Clef, Norgran, Down Home, Verve, and Pablo and the Jazz at the Philharmonic concert series. He was acknowledged as "the most successful impresario in the history of jazz" and was also a champion of racial equality, insisting, for example, on integrating audiences at concerts he promoted.

== Biography ==
Born in Boyle Heights, Los Angeles, Granz was the son of Jewish immigrants from Tiraspol (now in Transnistria). After school, he began work as a stock clerk on the Los Angeles Stock Exchange. When the United States joined World War II, he was drafted into the U.S. Army Air Force and subsequently posted to the Morale Branch, the department charged with troops' entertainment.

He emerged into public view when he organized desegregated jam sessions at the Trouville Club in Los Angeles, which he later expanded when he staged a memorable concert at the Philharmonic Auditorium in Los Angeles on Sunday, July 2, 1944, under the heading "Jazz at the Philharmonic".

The title of the concert, "A Jazz Concert at the Philharmonic Auditorium", had been shortened by the printer of the advertising supplements to "Jazz at the Philharmonic". Only one copy of the first concert program is known to exist. Granz had organized the first Jazz at the Philharmonic concert with about $300 of borrowed money. Later known as JATP, the ever-changing group recorded and toured extensively, with Granz producing some of the first live jam session recordings to be distributed to a wide market.

After several JATP concerts in Los Angeles in 1944 and 1945, Granz began producing JATP concert tours, from late fall of 1945 to 1957 in the U.S. and Canada and from 1952 in Europe. They featured swing and bop musicians and were among the first high-profile performances to feature racially-integrated bands. In fact, Granz cancelled some bookings rather than have the musicians perform for segregated audiences. He recorded many of the JATP concerts, and, from 1945 to 1947, sold/leased the recordings to Asch/Disc/Stinson Records (record producer Moses Asch's labels).

In 1948, Granz signed an agreement with Mercury Records for the promotion and the distribution of the JATP recordings and other recordings. After the agreement expired in 1953, he issued the JATP recordings and other recordings on Clef Records (founded 1946) and Norgran Records (founded 1953). Down Home Records was intended for traditional jazz works. In 1956, Granz also signed an agreement with the A&R director Ben Selvin to showcase several JATP recordings within the RCA Thesaurus library, including performances by such jazz luminaries as Count Basie, Roy Eldridge, Ella Fitzgerald, Stan Getz, Gene Krupa, Oscar Peterson, and Art Tatum. Jazz at the Philharmonic ceased touring the U.S. and Canada after concerts in the fall of 1957, apart from a North American Tour in 1967.

== Personal life ==
Granz married three times. In 1950, he married Loretta (née Snyder) Sullivan from Michigan; they had a daughter together, Stormont Granz, who was disabled due to a lack of oxygen during birth. Loretta was previously married and had a child, Sydney Sullivan Hamed, whom Granz adopted. They separated in 1953 and divorced in 1955. In 1965, he married Hannelore Granz, a former airline stewardess from Germany. In 1974, he married Grete Lyngby from Denmark.

Granz was also interested in art, developing a friendship with Pablo Picasso, whom he met in 1968.

Granz died of cancer on November 22, 2001, at the age of 83, in Geneva, Switzerland.

=== Racial equality efforts ===
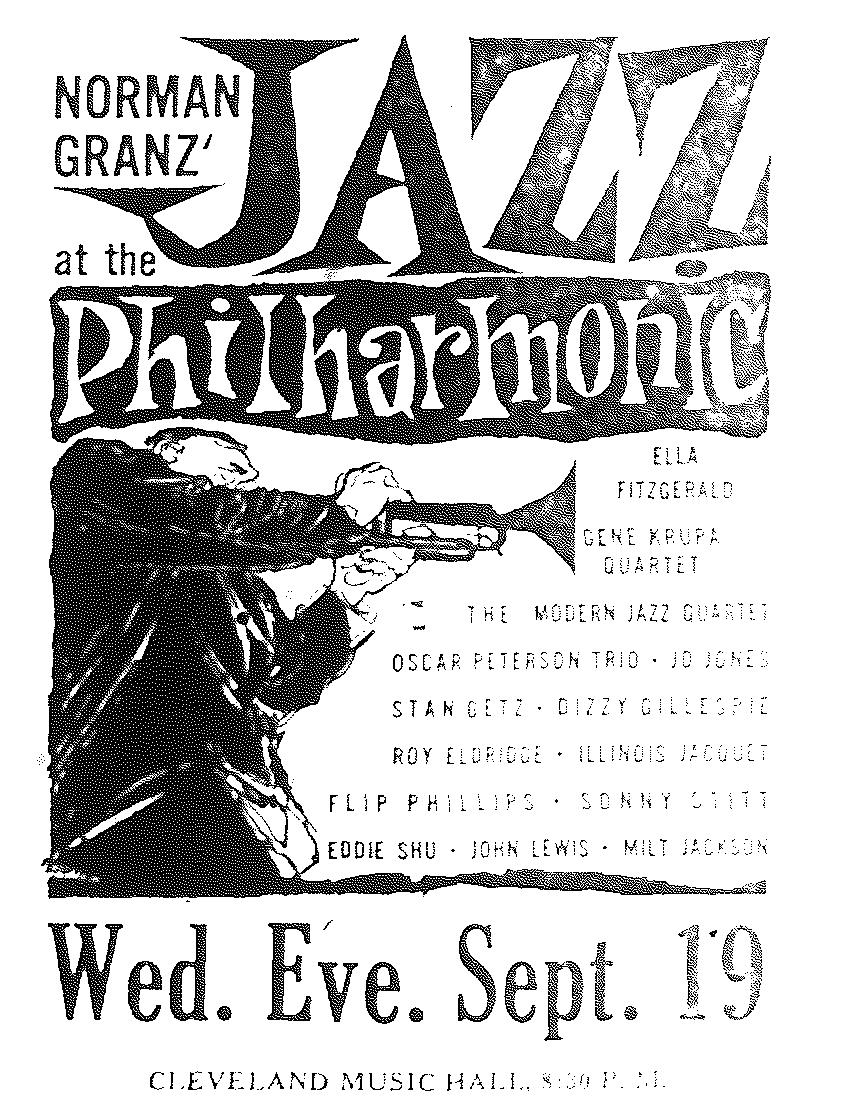
Jazz at the Philharmonic promotional poster for a concert at the Cleveland Music Hall on September 19, 1955

Granz opposed racism and fought many battles for his musicians, many of whom were black. In 1955, in Houston, he removed signs that previously designated "White" and "Negro" restrooms outside the auditorium where two concerts were to be performed by Ella Fitzgerald and Dizzy Gillespie. Between the two shows, Fitzgerald, Gillespie, and Illinois Jacquet were shooting small-stakes dice in the dressing room to kill time, when the local police barged in and arrested them. After some negotiations, they were allowed to perform the second show and later were formally released on $50 bail. Granz was incensed by the incident and insisted on fighting the charges in court, which was successful but cost him over $2,000.

Oscar Peterson recounted how Granz once insisted that white cabdrivers take his black musicians as customers, while a policeman pointed a loaded pistol at his stomach. Granz also was among the first to pay white and black artists the same salary, and to give them equal treatment even in minor details such as dressing rooms. He insisted on equal treatment for Ella Fitzgerald, in both pay and hotel accommodations.

Granz also spearheaded the fight to desegregate the hotels and casinos in Las Vegas, arguing that it was unfair that black artists could perform on the stages, but could not stay or gamble at the hotels or even enter through the front doors.

== Recordings ==
Many top-flight talents in jazz history recorded for one of Granz's labels, including Louis Armstrong, Count Basie, Louie Bellson, Benny Carter, Buck Clayton, Buddy DeFranco, Roy Eldridge, Herb Ellis, Tal Farlow, Ella Fitzgerald, Slim Gaillard, Stan Getz, Dizzy Gillespie, Lionel Hampton, Coleman Hawkins, Johnny Hodges, Billie Holiday, Illinois Jacquet, Hank Jones, Gene Krupa, Anita O'Day, Charlie Parker, Joe Pass, Oscar Peterson, Flip Phillips, Bud Powell, Buddy Rich, Mort Sahl, Sonny Stitt, Art Tatum, Ben Webster, and Lester Young.

Granz saw to it that his musicians were well paid. In the segregated society of the 1940s, he insisted on equal pay and accommodation for white and black musicians. He refused to take his hugely popular concerts to places that were segregated, even if he had to cancel concerts, thereby sacrificing considerable sums of money.

In 1944, Granz and Gjon Mili produced the jazz film Jammin' the Blues, starring Lester Young, Illinois Jacquet, Barney Kessel, Harry Edison, Jo Jones, Sid Catlett, Marlowe Morris, and Marie Bryant, which was nominated for an Academy Award.

It was in 1956 that Granz created Verve Records to distribute albums by Ella Fitzgerald, his new client. Granz had recently become her manager, and he unified his recording activities, including a back catalogue of his previous labels, Clef and Norgran, under the common Verve imprint. Granz would manage Fitzgerald for the rest of her career. Fitzgerald's memorable series of eight Song Books, together with the duet series (notably Armstrong–Peterson, Fitzgerald–Basie, Fitzgerald–Pass, and Getz–Peterson) achieved wide popularity and brought acclaim to the label and to the artists. Granz was also the manager of Oscar Peterson, another lifelong friend.

In 1959, Granz moved to Switzerland. In December 1960, Verve Records was sold to Metro-Goldwyn-Mayer.

Granz founded his final label, Pablo Records, in 1973. He sold Pablo to Fantasy Records in 1989.

== See also ==
- Category:Albums produced by Norman Granz
