= Jazz at the Philharmonic =

Series of concerts, tours and recordings

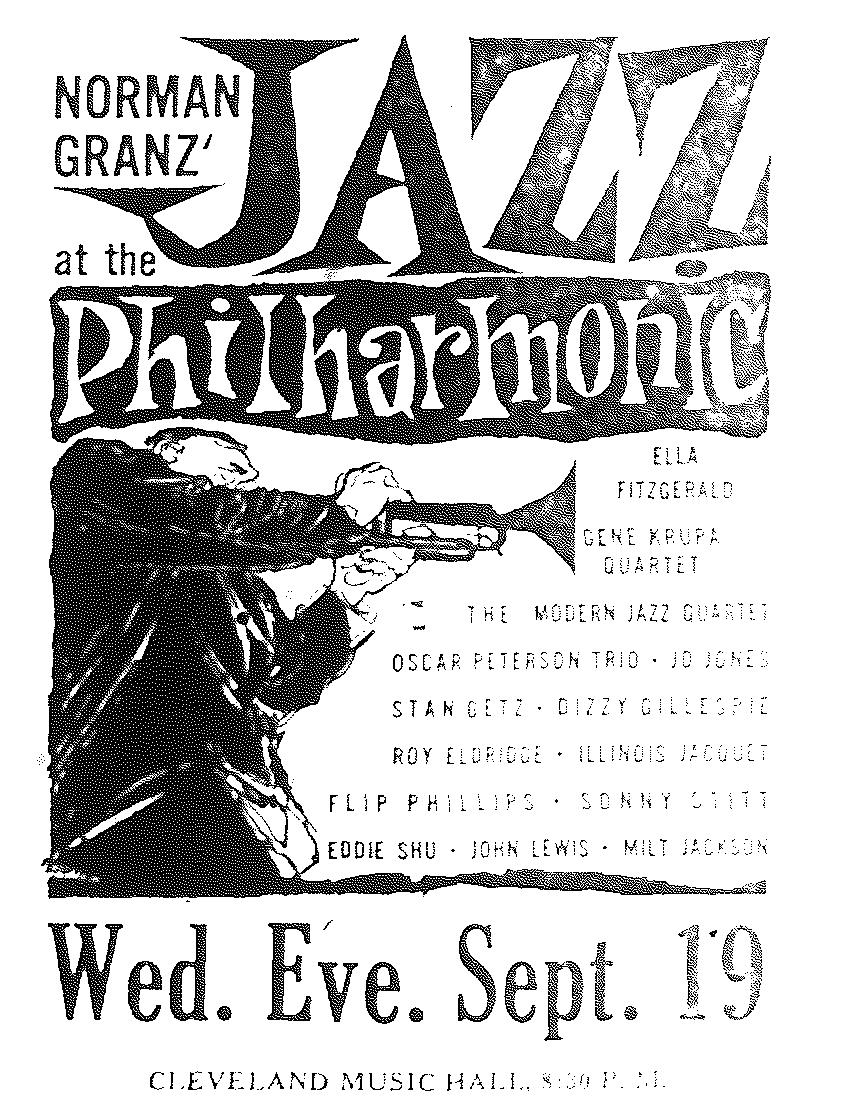
JATP concert announcement 1956

Jazz at the Philharmonic, or JATP (1944–1983), was the title of a series of jazz concerts, tours and recordings produced by Norman Granz.

Over the years, "Jazz at the Philharmonic" featured many of the era's preeminent musicians, including Irving Ashby, Louie Bellson, Ray Brown, Benny Carter, Nat King Cole, Sonny Criss, Buddy DeFranco, Harry "Sweets" Edison, Roy Eldridge, Herb Ellis, Ella Fitzgerald, Stan Getz, Dizzy Gillespie, Lionel Hampton, Bill Harris, Coleman Hawkins, J. C. Heard, Billie Holiday, Helen Humes, the Modern Jazz Quartet, Illinois Jacquet, J. J. Johnson, Hank Jones, Jo Jones, Barney Kessel, Kenny Kersey, Gene Krupa, Lou Levy, Meade Lux Lewis, Shelly Manne, Fats Navarro, Charlie Parker, Oscar Peterson, Flip Phillips, Buddy Rich, Charlie Shavers, Willie Smith, Sonny Stitt, Slim Gaillard, Clark Terry, Tommy Turk, T-Bone Walker, Ben Webster, Lee Young, Lester Young, and Trummy Young.

== Concerts and tours ==
The very first concert was held on Sunday, July 2, 1944, at the Philharmonic Auditorium, Los Angeles, and featured Illinois Jacquet, Jack McVea, J. J. Johnson, Shorty Sherock, Nat King Cole, Les Paul, Johnny Miller, Meade Lux Lewis, Bumps Myers, Joe Sullivan, Buddy Rich, Randall Miller, Bud Hatch, Marie Bryant, Red Callender, Lee Young, and Carolyn Richards. Illinois Jacquet, Nat King Cole and Les Paul, in particular, created a sensation. The title of the concert had been shortened by the printer of the advertising supplements from "A Jazz Concert at the Philharmonic Auditorium" to "Jazz at the Philharmonic". Norman Granz organized the concert with about $300 of borrowed money. Only one copy of the first concert program is known to exist.

Jazz tenor saxophonist Flip Phillips played at all the JATP concerts from 1946 to 1957.

Norman Granz recorded many JATP concerts, and sold or leased (from 1945 to 1947) the recordings to Asch/Disc/Stinson Records (record producer Moses Asch's labels). Later, from 1948 to 1953, Granz leased the Jazz at the Philharmonic recordings to Mercury Records, and later issued/reissued them on Norgran (founded 1953), from 1953 on Clef (founded 1946), and from 1956 on Verve (founded 1956), which at the time, were his own labels.

In 1961, Granz sold Verve (which by then had absorbed the catalogues of his earlier labels, Clef Records and Norgran Records, as well as material previously licensed to Mercury Records) to MGM Records for $3.1 million.

In the 1970s, Granz kept the spirit of the JATP alive on his many jam session style records for his Pablo label (founded 1973), also used for previously unissued JATP concerts. In 1987, he sold Pablo to Fantasy Records.

The JATP concerts featured swing and bebop musicians. They were among the first high-profile performances to feature racially integrated bands, and Granz cancelled some bookings rather than have the musicians perform for segregated audiences.

=== Tours ===
JATP Tours - USA and Canada (1945–1957):

1. 1st National Tour: Late Fall/Winter of 1945–46.
2. 2nd National Tour: Spring, 1946.
3. 3rd National Tour: Fall, 1946.
4. 4th National Tour: Spring, 1947.
5. 5th National Tour: Fall, 1947.
6. 6th National Tour: Spring, 1948.
7. 7th National Tour: Fall, 1948.
8. 8th National Tour: Spring, 1949.
9. 9th National Tour: Fall, 1949.
10. 10th National Tour: Fall, 1950.
11. 11th National Tour: Fall, 1951.
12. 12th National Tour: Fall, 1952.
13. 13th National Tour (USA, Canada, Hawaii, Australia and Japan): Fall, 1953.
14. 14th National Tour: Fall, 1954.
15. 16th National Tour (Note: the 15th National Tour, in the fall of 1955, was renamed: 16th National Tour, just weeks before the start of the JATP Tour): Fall, 1955.
16. 17th National Tour: Fall, 1956.
17. 18th National Tour: Fall, 1957.

JATP Tours - Europe (1952–1959)

- 1st European Tour: Spring, 1952.
- 2nd European Tour (Only two concerts in the UK: London, March 8 at Gaumont State Kilburn): Spring, 1953.
- 3rd European Tour: Spring, 1954.
- 4th European Tour: Spring, 1955.
- 5th European Tour: Spring, 1956.
- 6th European Tour: Spring, 1957.
- 7th European Tour (1st UK Tour!): Spring, 1958.
- 8th European Tour: Spring, 1959.

After the JATP concerts in the fall of 1957, "Jazz at the Philharmonic" ceased touring the United States and Canada (with the exception of one final North American Tour in 1967), but continued intermittently mainly in Europe and Japan until 1983, with the last JATP concerts being performed in October, 1983, in Tokyo, Japan.

== Legacy ==
Recordings held by Verve Records of the first five years (1944–1949) of JATP have been issued in a Deluxe 10-CD Box Set.

The Jazz at the Philharmonic recordings were selected by the Library of Congress as a 2010 addition to the National Recording Registry, which selects recordings annually that are "culturally, historically, or aesthetically significant".
