= Manfred Selchow =

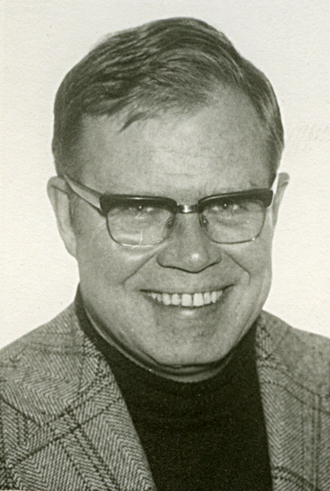
Manfred Selchow

Manfred Selchow (October 2, 1936, in Varbelow, East Pomerania – November 5, 2023, in Westoverledingen, Germany) was a jazz authority and author.

== Biography ==
His father, a school teacher, did not return from the war. In 1945, his mother and two siblings, fled from the Red Army and ended up in Berlin, where he went to school and spent his entire youth. During his school days, he started playing the violin and piano becoming good enough to earn a free three-year scholarship to the Berlin Conservatory. During that time, he "lost interest" in practicing the violin and concentrated on the piano, trying to play Jazz. Not an easy task, playing "by ear", without any money to buy written arrangements or sheet music. Selchow's playing was good enough for a student band but, having listened to the piano 'Greats', he soon realised that he would never reach their level. While others continued to perform, he stopped playing in public.

In 1958, Selchow began studying at the University of Braunschweig, to become a teacher as well. In 1961 he began working as a teacher and retired being a principal in 1995. Selchow was married and had four married children. He had five grandchildren and as of 2019 four great-grandchildren.

His passion for jazz started in Berlin at the age of 12, where he and his friend often got together, to listen to the few, old 78 shellac records they owned. It was during those years that many of the great Jazz musicians came to Berlin. Selchow would rarely miss an opportunity to see one of the greats, like Roy Eldridge, Buck Clayton, Bill Harris, Lester Young, Flip Phillips, Illinois Jacquet, Oscar Peterson, Ray Brown, Gene Krupa, Louie Bellson and others with "Jazz at the Philharmonic".

Many of the great bands came through as well: Count Basie, Duke Ellington, Woody Herman. Lionel Hampton did come several times and became a favorite of young Selchow. In 1955 Louis Armstrong came to the "Berlin Sportpalast", bringing along one of Manfred Selchow's "heroes" — Edmond Hall. Selchow remembers: "I had heard him before on records, but seeing him there, that was something else! A love was born." Berlin saw them all, all the greats - Billie Holiday, Coleman Hawkins, Red Norvo, Benny Goodman, and many more.

Since 1986 Selchow had organized and accompanied 33 jazz tours in Germany and Switzerland. Selchow had the opportunity to meet many of the great legends, like Wild Bill Davison, Yank Lawson, Ralph Sutton, Jack Lesberg, Norris Turney, Oliver Jackson, Nat Pierce, Peanuts Hucko and Bob Haggart many of whom became friends of his. Selchow continues to promote and host concerts near his home in North West Germany. Many of the best musicians from around the world including Australia, UK, Italy, Austria, France, Finland, Belgium, The Netherlands, Japan and Germany have performed together in over 50.

It was during these tours that his close friend Hans Nagel Hayer agreed to record and issue recordings of many of the concerts with Manfred doing the managing and often writing the sleeve notes for the Nagel Heyer label.

Selchow was also an International Member of the (now defunct) Association of Jazz Record Collectors. His collection contains about 3,000 LPs, 4500 CDs, hundreds of 78s and more than 7,000 tape cassettes. He also owns a collection of about 200 films of rare jazz music footage.

== Publications ==
- Manfred Selchow; Karsten Lohmann (1981). Edmond Hall - a discography. K. Lohmann.
- Manfred Selchow (1988). Profoundly Blue: A Bio-Discographical Scrapbook on Edmond Hall. Manfred Selchow and Uhle and Kleimann.
- Ding! Ding! A Bio-discographical Scrapbook on Vic Dickenson. Manfred Selchow. 1998. p. 947.

== Critical reception ==
The books have received a positive reception from critics. Stanley Dance wrote a review of the Vic Dickenson in which he said What with Selchow’s similar 640-page book on Edmond Hall (Profoundly Blue) and the late Klaus Stratemann’s Duke Ellington Day by Day and Film by Film, it is necessary to recognize that some of the best, ego-free jazz scholarship is now coming from Germany. Bruce D Epperson also writes about him
