= Edmond Hall =

American jazz clarinetist and bandleader (1901–1967)

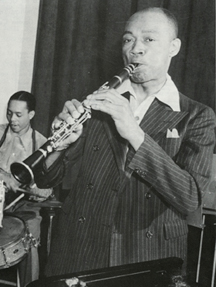

Background information
- Born: May 15, 1901; Reserve, Louisiana, U.S.
- Died: February 11, 1967 (aged 65) Boston, Massachusetts
- Genres: Swing, Dixieland
- Occupation: Musician
- Instruments: Clarinet, alto saxophone, baritone saxophone

Edmond Hall (May 15, 1901 – February 11, 1967) was an American jazz clarinetist and bandleader. Over his career, Hall worked extensively with many leading performers as both a sideman and bandleader and is possibly best known for the 1941 chamber jazz song "Profoundly Blue".

== Biography ==
=== Early life ===
Born in Reserve, Louisiana, United States, about 40 miles west of New Orleans on the Mississippi River, Hall and his siblings were born into a musical family. His father, Edward Blainey Hall, and mother, Caroline Duhe, had eight children, Priscilla (1893), Moretta (1895), Viola (1897), Robert (1899), Edmond (1901), Clarence (1903), Edward (1905) and Herbert (1907).

His father, Edward, played the clarinet in the Onward Brass Band, joined by Edmond's maternal uncles, Jules Duhe on trombone, Lawrence Duhe on clarinet, and Edmond Duhe on guitar. The Hall brothers, Robert, Edmond, and Herbert, all became clarinetists, but Edmond was first taught guitar by his uncle Edmond. When Hall picked up the clarinet, "he could play it within a week. He started Monday and played it Saturday," his brother Herb recalled in an interview with Manfred Selchow, who wrote a biography of Hall titled Profoundly Blue (1988).

Hall worked as a farmhand, but by 1919 he had become tired of the hard work, and despite his parents' worries of him finding a decent job as a musician, he left for New Orleans. The first New Orleans band he played with was that of Bud Rousell (Bud Russell). He also played with Jack Carey (trombone) and blues cornetist Chris Kelley.

=== Music career ===
In 1920, he went to a dance at Economy Hall in New Orleans where Buddy Petit was playing. Petit needed a replacement on clarinet, and he hired Hall. After two years, he moved to Pensacola, Florida, and joined Lee Collins's band, followed by Mack Thomas, and the Pensacola Jazzers. He met trumpeter Cootie Williams and, with Williams, he joined the Alonzo Ross DeLuxe Syncopators.

Hall moved to New York City in 1928, and was a member of the Claude Hopkins orchestra until 1935. Hall had been featured on alto and baritone saxophone since 1922. When he joined Billy Hicks's band, the Sizzling Six, he had a position as a full-time clarinetist. On June 15, 1937, he had his first recording session with Billie Holiday, accompanied by Lester Young on tenor saxophone.

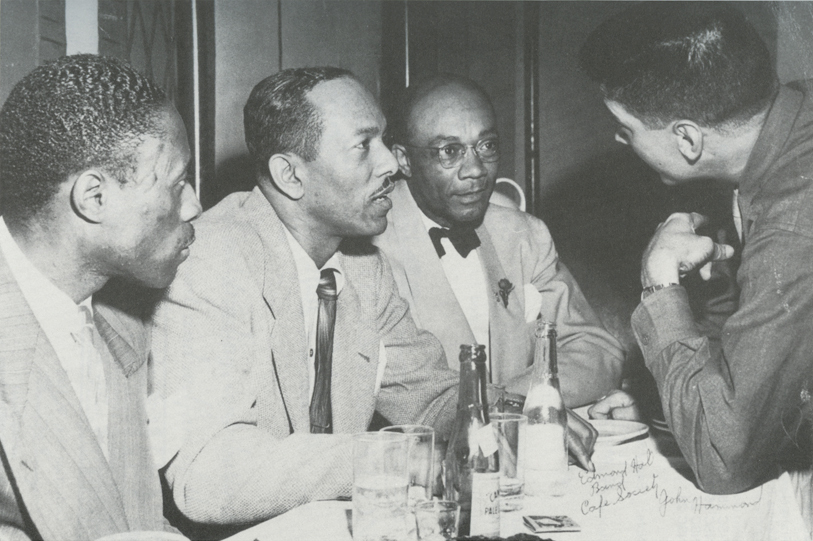
At the Café Society, from left: Joe Williams, Andy Kirk, Edmond Hall, and John Hammond

In 1940, Henry "Red" Allen arrived at the Café Society, and Hall became the band's clarinetist. Hall spent nine years at the Café Society, playing and recording in between jobs with many of his contemporaries, such as Sid Catlett, Charlie Christian, Ida Cox, Wild Bill Davison, Sidney De Paris, Vic Dickenson, Roy Eldridge, Bud Freeman, Coleman Hawkins, Eddie Heywood, J. C. Higginbotham, Meade Lux Lewis, Lucky Millinder, Hot Lips Page, Zutty Singleton, Joe Sullivan, Art Tatum, Jack Teagarden, Big Joe Turner, Helen Ward, and Josh White. He recorded for the first time as a leader in February 1941.

Late in 1941, Hall left Allen to join Teddy Wilson, who also played at the Café Society. Around this time Hall's style changed. His admiration for Benny Goodman and Artie Shaw caused him to work on his technique. Hall tried a Boehm system clarinet, but that attempt was short-lived. He soon went back to his beloved Albert System clarinet, which he played until he died.

During this period, he made many recordings as Edmond Hall's Blue Note Jazzmen, the Edmond Hall Sextet, the Edmond Hall Celeste Quartet, Edmond Hall's Star Quintet, Ed Hall and the Big City Jazzmen, and Edmond Hall's Swingtet. The recording sessions always took place between the work hours of the Café Society and included many of the musicians who performed there. Hall was frequently invited to the Town Hall concerts led by Eddie Condon.

In 1944, Teddy Wilson formed a trio, while the other band members remained at Café Society. Hall became a bandleader after being asked by Barney Josephson, owner of Café Society. He recorded for Blue Note and Commodore. In an Esquire magazine poll, he was voted the second-best clarinet player, behind the clarinetist he admired most, Benny Goodman.

=== With Louis Armstrong ===
In the mid-1940s, Barney Josephson sought new musicians to play Café Society. In June 1947, Hall left the club. Early in 1947 Louis Armstrong's appearance at Carnegie Hall was announced. Hall and his small combo were picked to accompany Armstrong during half of the program. As a result of this concert, Armstrong would abandon his big band and switch a small combo, the All Stars.

In September 1947, Hall joined the All-Star Stompers with Wild Bill Davison, Ralph Sutton and Baby Dodds. Meanwhile, Barney Josephson again asked Hall to return to Uptown Café Society with a new band. Business worsened, however, and Josephson closed Uptown in December 1947. Hall took his men back to Downtown Café Society but, in June 1948, Hall's band was replaced with the Dave Martin Trio.

In late 1948, Hall took a job at Boston's Savoy Cafe, playing with members of Bob Wilber's band. He also promoted a concert with George Wein. Steve Connolly of the Savoy Cafe asked Hall to bring his own band and replace Bob Wilber. Hall's band, the Edmond Hall All-Stars, began playing the Savoy on April 4, 1949.

Hall left the Savoy in early March 1950 to return to New York. He played clubs and festivals, including one job in San Francisco. Eddie Condon called Hall in San Francisco, asking him to join his band at Eddie Condon's. Hall stayed with Condon, playing other jobs as well, mostly with members from Condon's band. An example was the Annual Steamboat Ball in June 1951 and the frequent sessions for the Dr. Jazz broadcasts during 1952. Condon's band recorded many sessions during Hall's engagement.

In November 1952, Hall participated in a special concert, "Hot Versus Cool," which pitted New Orleans-style jazz against bop. The New Orleans-style musicians were Hall, Dick Cary, Vic Dickenson, Jack Lesberg, Jimmy McPartland, and George Wettling. On the opposite side were Ray Abrams, Don Elliott, Dizzy Gillespie, Al McKibbon, and Max Roach. The album received a top rating of five stars in DownBeat magazine. During 1954, Hall played with Ralph Sutton, Mel Powell, and Jack Teagarden.

At the end of 1955, Hall left Condon to appear as a guest musician on the Teddy Wilson show. He then replaced Barney Bigard in the Louis Armstrong band, which toured Europe and Sweden. Felix Blair of The New York Times wrote, "America's secret weapon is a blue note in a minor key. Right now its most effective ambassador is Louis Satchmo Armstrong." The quotation was used for the album Ambassador Satch.

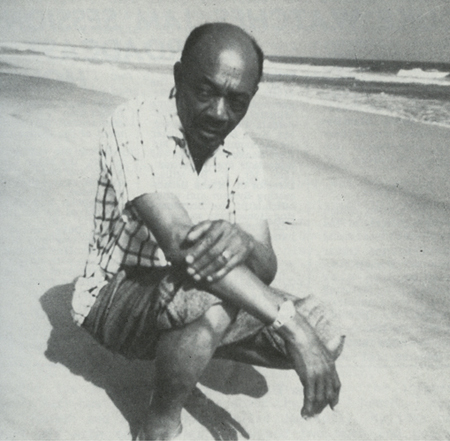
Hall on a beach in Ghana, 1950

The band moved to Los Angeles to participate in the filming of High Society (1956) starring Grace Kelly and Bing Crosby. After tours in Australia and England, the band visited Ghana, Africa, where it played for its largest audience, 11,000 at the first concert. Back in the U.S., there was a performance with the New York Philharmonic under Leonard Bernstein. The evening's grand finale was Bernstein conducting the stadium symphony orchestra in an Alfredo Antonini arrangement of "Saint Louis Blues". The event was held at Lewisohn Stadium in New York, which drew a crowd of 21,000 people. The event was filmed as part of the documentary Satchmo the Great, produced and narrated by Edward R. Murrow, with film clips of the tours in Europe and Ghana.

The All Stars appeared on The Ed Sullivan Show before leaving for the midwest to play the Ravinia Festival near Chicago. They participated in a Norman Granz Benefit at Hollywood Bowl. In December 1956, they recorded the album Satchmo – A Musical Autobiography and supported it with a tour in the U.S. and South America. Hall became an honorary member of the Hot Club De Buenos Aires.

Tired of touring, Hall left the All-Stars and took a vacation in California. After his vacation, he performed with old friends Eddie Condon, Ralph Sutton, Teddy Wilson, Red Allen, and J. C. Higginbotham. Hall was invited to play with bands in Toronto, then returned to Chicago for an engagement at the Jazz, Ltd. club. At the end of 1958, he entered the studio to record Petit Fleur with his sextet, including friends from Cafe Society such as Vic Dickenson.

Hall returned to Ghana, having been impressed with its beauty, friendliness, and lack of racial prejudice. His goal was to settle there and start a music school. Hall and Winnie left New York for an exploratory trip, and when they returned they had decided to move to Ghana. Before moving, Hall was invited to the South Shore Jazz Festival in Milton, Massachusetts. He recorded Rumpus on Rampart Street with his orchestra, then left for Ghana. But his attempt at a music school failed. He was unable to get students to practice, and their lack of discipline and interest motivated his return to the U.S.

Hall flew to Copenhagen in 1961 to perform as a guest with Papa Bue's Viking Jazz Band. Returning home, he assembled the Hall American Jazz Stars and played at Condon's in New York City. During the early 1960s, he worked often, touring with Yves Montand and Chris Barber, and recording with Leonard Gaskin, Marlowe Morris, and the Dukes of Dixieland. In 1964, Hall and his wife settled in Cambridge, Massachusetts.

=== Last years ===
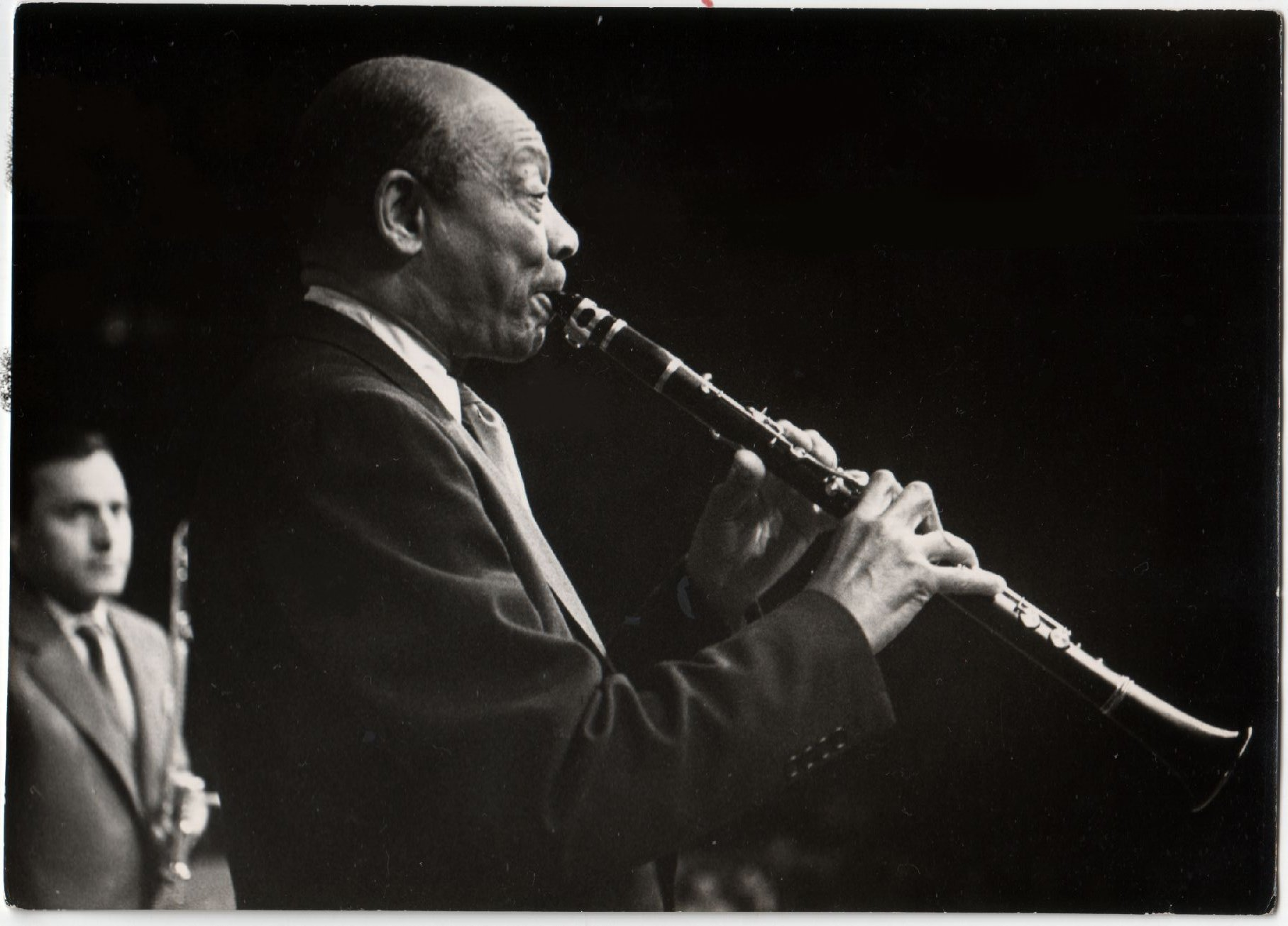
Hall in Czechoslovakia, 1962

George Wein assembled a package of bands, and Hall was the featured star with the Dukes of Dixieland, who toured Japan in July 1964. He played at the Carnegie Hall Salute to Eddie Condon and appeared at jazz festivals, often with his friend Vic Dickenson.

For a few months, he played regularly at the Monticello restaurant, often in front of little or no audience as jazz was less popular. Hall would have played for as little as $50, but his wife did not let him unless the offer was at least $70–$75. By then Hall was semi-retired and would show up unexpectedly at a nearby pub where the local band, Tomasso and His Jewels of Dixieland, would play. According to Tomasso, they never knew when Hall would show up. Hall did that for an about six months for free, without any contract, for the pleasure of playing.

A break came in November 1966, when plans for a European tour were made. Hall was to play with Alan Elsdon's band during the tour, which began in England and extended to Germany, Denmark, and Sweden. Hall returned to Denmark to record for Storyville at the Rosenberg Studio in Copenhangen.

Hall was back home for Christmas. In January 1967, there was another important engagement, John Hammond's 30th Anniversary Concert – Spirituals to Swing at Carnegie Hall in New York. Hall was invited as he belonged the Café Society Band, which was featured at the concert. The next important concert was the Second Annual Boston Globe Jazz Festival on January 21, 1967. On February 3, 1967, Hall played at the Governor Dummer Academy with George Poor's band as a featured performer with Bobby Hackett. This was his last recording (JCD-233).

Hall died on February 12, 1967, at the age of 65.

=== Private life ===
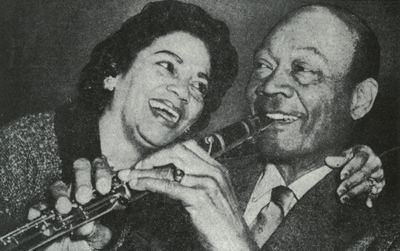
Hall with his wife, Winnie, 1965

In April 1922, while playing in Buddy Petit's Band, Hall married 17-year-old Octavia Stewart. The marriage was prompted by the imminent arrival of their son, Elton Edmond Hall, who was born on July 20, 1922, but died as a child on December 3, 1934.

On May 12, 1938, he married his second wife, Winnifred Henry from Cambridge, Massachusetts. He met her while he was a member of the Hopkins Band three years earlier at Ruggles Hall in Boston. The couple had no children. Hall was constantly practicing his clarinet even on his days off. Winnie sometimes accompanied him on his travels. They had friends in England whom they visited frequently.

Throughout his career into the mid-1950s, Hall faced racial discrimination. In 1951, while he was playing at Eddie Condon's, a Columbia Pictures film crew arrived to shoot a short with the band. The producers wanted Hall to record the clarinet part for the soundtrack but have Peanuts Hucko appear on screen in his place, reasoning that showing a Black musician in the band would cost them audiences in the Southern states. Hall refused and called his union, Local 802 of the American Federation of Musicians. Condon and the other musicians supported him, and the union insisted that either Hall appeared on screen or no one played. Columbia shot two versions—one with Hall and one with Hucko—but ultimately released only the version with Hall. Hall also recalled being frequently stopped by police over minor infractions such as the way he had parked his car, while his white bandmates were not bothered. On one occasion, he and his wife were refused a hotel room and were forced to spend the night in their car.

In 1952, Hall, Buzzy Drootin and Ralph Sutton appeared as the Ralph Sutton Trio in Saint Louis, where they played the "Encore Lounge" for several weeks. They were the first mixed trio there.

== Awards and honors ==
- Silver Award for clarinet, Esquire magazine, 1945
- Certificate of nomination, one of outstanding jazz artists, Playboy magazine, 1961
- Best Clarinetist, Melody Maker magazine, 1961

== Discography ==
=== As leader ===
- 1937–44 - The Chronological 1937–1944 (Classics, 1995)
- 1941–44 - Profoundly Blue (Blue Note, 1998)
- 1941–44 - Celestial Express (Blue Note, 1969)
- 1943–44 - Jamming in Jazz (Blue Note, 1951) (& Sidney De Paris)
- 1943 - Swing Session With Edmond Hall (Commodore, 1959)
- 1944 - Rompin' in '44 (Circle, ?)
- 1944–45 - The Chronological 1944–1945 (Classics, 1996)
- 1949 - Jazz at the Savoy (Savoy, 1954)
- 1958 - Petite Fleur (United Artists, 1959)
- 1959 - Rumpus On Rampart St. (Mount Vernon Music, 1959)
- 1966 - Edmond Hall with Alan Elsdon's Band (Jazzology, 1995)
- 1964–67 - Edmond Hall's Last Concert (Jazzology, 1996)

=== As sideman ===
- Louis Armstrong, European Concert by Ambassador Satch (Columbia, 1955)
- Louis Armstrong & Eddie Condon, At Newport (Columbia, 1956)
- Louis Armstrong, Louis and the Good Book (Decca, 1958)
- Chris Barber, Chris Barber's American Jazz Band (Laurie, 1959)
- Eddie Condon, Bixieland (Columbia, 1955)
- Eddie Condon, Jammin' at Condon's (Columbia, 1955)
- Wild Bill Davison, Ringside at Condon's Featuring Wild Bill Davison (Savoy, 1956)
- Vic Dickenson, The Vic Dickenson Showcase (Vanguard, 1953)
- Vic Dickenson & Urbie Green, Slidin' Swing (Jazztone, 1957)
- Bud Freeman, Midnight at Eddie Condon's (Emarcy, 1955)
- Leonard Gaskin, At the Jazz Band Ball (Prestige Swingville, 1962)
- Marlowe Morris, Play the Thing (Columbia, 1962)
- Jack Teagarden, Jazz Great (Bethlehem, 1956)
- Various, Edmond Hall 1941-1957 (Giants of Jazz CD, nd)
