= Bli Blip =

Song by Duke Ellington

Bli Blip is a song composed by Duke Ellington with lyrics by Sid Kuller.

"Bli Blip" was featured in Ellington's 1941 musical revue Jump for Joy.

It was performed by Marie Bryant and Paul White in a 1942 soundie featuring Ellington and his orchestra produced by Sam Coslow for R.C.M. Productions and directed by Josef Berne. The soundie was released on 5 January 1942.

Ellington and his orchestra made the first recording of "Bli Blip" on 26 September 1941 at the Hollywood Recording Studio in Los Angeles.

John Franceschina, in his 2017 book Duke Ellington's Music for the Theatre, described "Bli Blip" as a "catchy, blues, rhythm number" with a "highly syncopated melody line, filled with skips and scat-like riffs". Franceschina notes that the "arhythmical nature of the melody in which no two bars are exactly alike".

== Recordings ==
- Ella Fitzgerald - Ella Fitzgerald Sings the Duke Ellington Song Book (Verve, 1957)
- New York Voices - Sing! Sing! Sing! (Concord Jazz, 2000)
- P.J. Benjamin and Terri Klausner - Sophisticated Ladies (1981) (Original Broadway cast recording)
- Dee Dee Bridgewater with the Hollywood Bowl Orchestra and John Mauceri - Prelude to a Kiss: The Duke Ellington Album (1996)
- The Lincoln Center Jazz Orchestra with Wynton Marsalis and Dianne Reeves - Live in Swing City - Swingin' with Duke (Columbia, 1999)
