= Sid Catlett (basketball) =

American basketball player (1948–2017)

Personal information
- Born: April 18, 1948 Washington, D.C., U.S.
- Died: November 3, 2017 (aged 69) Atlanta, Georgia, U.S.
- Listed height: 6 ft 8 in (2.03 m)
- Listed weight: 230 lb (104 kg)

Career information
- High school: DeMatha Catholic (Hyattsville, Maryland)
- College: Notre Dame (1968–1971)
- NBA draft: 1971: 4th round, 55th overall pick
- Drafted by: Cincinnati Royals
- Playing career: 1971–1972
- Position: Small forward
- Number: 43

Career history
- 1971: Cincinnati Royals
- 1971–1972: Trenton Pat Pavers

Career highlights
- Third-team Parade All-American (1966)
- Stats at NBA.com
- Stats at Basketball Reference

Sidney Leon Catlett Jr. (April 18, 1948 – November 3, 2017) was an American basketball player who played briefly in the National Basketball Association (NBA). He played college basketball for the Notre Dame Fighting Irish.

Catlett is known for his starring role in what several news sources have called the "Greatest High School Basketball Game Ever Played," on January 30, 1965, in which Catlett's DeMatha Catholic High School defeated the nationally #1 ranked Power Memorial Academy and its star center Lew Alcindor (later Kareem Abdul-Jabbar). Catlett scored a team-high 13 points in the 46-43 upset victory, including 7 points in the last four minutes of the game. In addition to receiving widespread national attention, the victory helped to cement DeMatha coach Morgan Wootten's status as one of the nation's great high-school basketball coaches.

He was selected by the Cincinnati Royals in the fourth round (55th pick overall) of the 1971 NBA draft.

He played for the Royals (1971–72) in the NBA for 9 games.

Catlett played three games for the Trenton Pat Pavers of the Eastern Basketball Association (EBA) during the 1971–72 season.

He is the son of the jazz drummer Sid Catlett. Catlett died on November 3, 2017, from complications of a brain bleed.

== Career statistics ==
Legend
GP	Games played	GS	Games started	MPG	Minutes per game
FG%	Field goal percentage	3P%	3-point field goal percentage	FT%	Free throw percentage
RPG	Rebounds per game	APG	Assists per game	SPG	Steals per game
BPG	Blocks per game	PPG	Points per game	**Bold**	Career high

=== NBA ===
==== Regular season ====
Year	Team	GP	MPG	FG%	FT%	RPG	APG	PPG
1971–72	Cincinnati	9	4.4	.222	.222	.4	.1	.7
