= Jammin' the Blues =

1944 film by Gjon Mili

- Directed by: Gjon Mili
- Produced by: Gordon Hollingshead
- Narrated by: Knox Manning
- Cinematography: Robert Burks
- Edited by: Everett Dodd
- Production company: Warner Bros.
- Distributed by: Warner Bros.
- Release date: November 9, 1944
- Running time: 10 minutes
- Country: United States
- Language: English

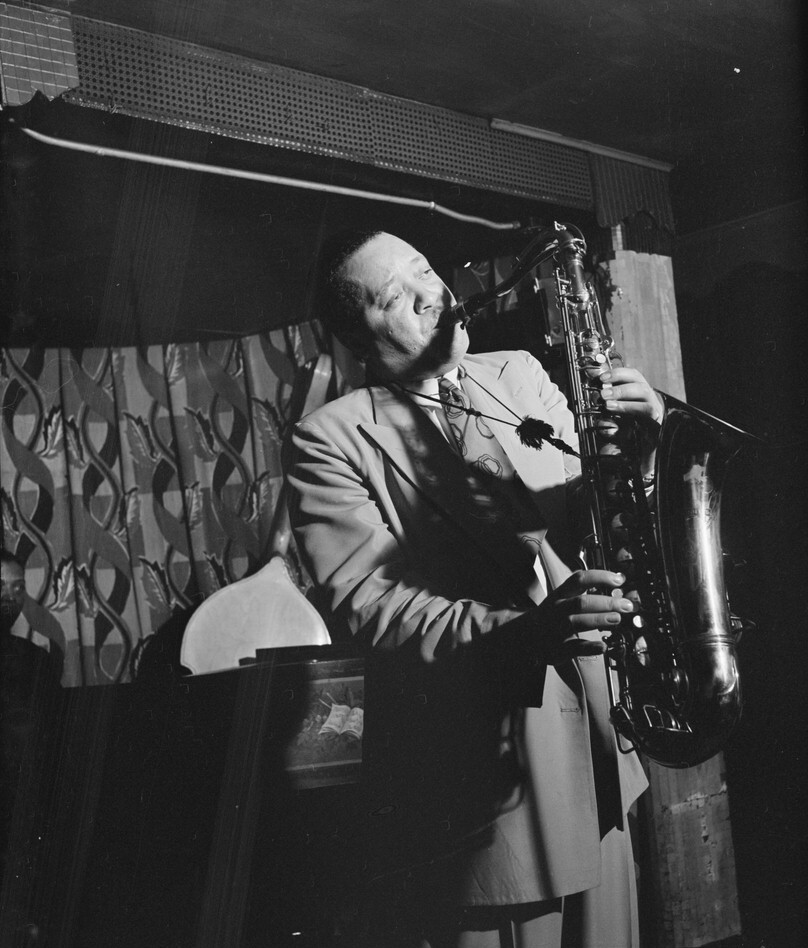
Portrait of Lester Young, Famous Door, New York, N.Y. by William Gottlieb circa September, 1946

Jammin' the Blues is a 1944 American short film made by Gjon Mili and Norman Granz in which a number of prominent jazz musicians re-create the jam-session atmosphere of nightclubs and after-hours spots.

The film features Lester Young, Red Callender, Harry Edison, Marlowe Morris, Sid Catlett, Barney Kessel, Jo Jones, John Simmons, Illinois Jacquet, Marie Bryant and Archie Savage.

== Cast ==
- Lester Young – Tenor saxophone
- Red Callender – Bass
- Harry "Sweets" Edison – Trumpet
- Marlowe Morris – Piano
- "Big" Sid Catlett – Drums (First two songs, and intro of third)
- Jo Jones – Drums (for final song)
- Barney Kessel – Guitar
- John Simmons – Double bass
- Illinois Jacquet – Tenor saxophone
- Marie Bryant – Vocals and Female Dancer
- Archie Savage – Male Dancer

== Songs ==
- "Midnight Symphony"
- "On the Sunny Side of the Street" – Sung by Marie Bryant
- "Jammin' the Blues"

== Production ==
Gjon Mili and Norman Granz, who was credited as technical director, shot the film over four days with the support of Warner Bros. head of short films, Gordon Hollingshead. Barney Kessel was the only white musician in the film. His hands were stained with berry juice, and he was seated in the shadows to shade his skin.

== Reception and legacy ==
Producer Gordon Hollingshead was nominated for an Oscar in the category of Best Short Subject, One-reel.

In 1995, Jammin' the Blues was selected for preservation in the United States National Film Registry by the Library of Congress as being "culturally, historically, or aesthetically significant".

The short was released on DVDs of the films Blues in the Night (1941) and Passage to Marseille (1944), the latter starring Humphrey Bogart.

== See also ==
- List of American films of 1944
- Swing music
- Bebop
