= The-Truth!!! =

Live album by Tommy Turk
- Released: 1977
- Recorded: 23 June 1977
- Venue: Nino's East, Pittsburgh
- Genre: Jazz
- Label: Asterik Recording

The-Truth!!! is the only full-length live recording by American jazz trombonist Tommy Turk. Asterik Recordings released the album in 1977. The release is a concert recording taken in Nino's East, Pittsburgh on 23 June 1977.

== Track listing ==
No.	Title	Length
1.	"Take The "A" Train"	7:52
2.	"Medley: If You Were Mine / Do Nothing 'Til You Hear From Me / Little Girl"	7:50
3.	"Hindustan"	8:10
4.	"Sweet Miss"	6:56
5.	"Medley: Misty / Easy Living / My Buddy / Solitude"	8:08
6.	"Satin Doll"	6:46

== Personnel ==
Band

- Flo Cassinelli – baritone saxophone, tenor saxophone
- Harry Bush – bass
- John Schmidt – drums
- Reid Jaynes – electric piano
- Tommy Turk – trombone

Production

- Ralph Cominio – engineer
- Dave O’Leary – engineer
