= Robert Burks =

American cinematographer, Academy Award winner (1909–1968)

- Born: Leslie Robert Burks; July 4, 1909; Chino, California, U.S.
- Died: May 13, 1968 (aged 58); Huntington Harbour, California, U.S.
- Occupation: Cinematographer
- Awards: Academy Award for Best Cinematography for To Catch a Thief (1955)

Leslie Robert Burks A.S.C. (July 4, 1909 – May 13, 1968) was an American cinematographer known for his collaborations with Alfred Hitchcock.

== Early life ==
Burks was born in Chino, California, on July 4, 1909.

When he was 19, Burks began working at Warner Bros. as a camera operator. He slowly worked his way up until he took over the Special Photographic Effects unit on Stage 5 in 1944 and became a director of photography in the mid-1940s.

== Career ==
Burks debuted his first short film as a cinematographer, Jammin' the Blues.

Impressed by Burks cinematography, Alfred Hitchcock invited him in to shoot his thriller Strangers on a Train which eventually won Burk his first Academy Award nomination.

Burks worked on many other films with Hitchcock including Strangers on a Train (1951), I Confess (1953), Dial M for Murder (1954), Rear Window (1954), To Catch a Thief (1955), The Trouble with Harry (1955), The Man Who Knew Too Much (1956), The Wrong Man (1956), Vertigo (1958), North by Northwest (1959), The Birds (1963), and Marnie(1964).

== Death ==
In 1968, Burks and his wife, Elisabeth, died in a fire at their home in Huntington Harbour, California. He was 58 years old.

== Filmography ==
Films as special effects photographer are:

- Marked Woman, 1937
- Dr. Ehrlich's Magic Bullet, 1940
- The Great Lie, 1941
- Highway West, 1941
- King Row, 1942
- In This Our Life, 1942
- Arsenic and Old Lace, 1944
- Pride of the Marines, 1945
- The Two Mrs. Carrolls, 1947
- Possessed, 1947
- The Unfaithful, 1947
- Cry Wolf, 1947
- Key Largo, 1948
- The Younger Brothers, 1949
- The Miracle of Our Lady of Fatima, 1952

Films shot by Burks include:

- Jammin' the Blues, 1944
- Make Your Own Bed, 1944
- Escape in the Desert, 1945
- To the Victor, 1948
- A Kiss in the Dark, 1948
- Task Force, 1949
- The Fountainhead, 1949
- Beyond the Forest, 1949
- The Glass Menagerie, 1950
- Close to My Heart, 1951
- The Enforcer, 1951
- Strangers on a Train, 1951
- Tomorrow is Another Day, 1951
- Come Fill the Cup, 1951
- Room for One More, 1952
- Mara Maru, 1952
- I Confess, 1953
- The Desert Song, 1953
- Hondo, 1953
- Dial M for Murder, 1954
- Rear Window, 1954
- To Catch a Thief, 1955
- The Trouble with Harry, 1955
- The Man Who Knew Too Much, 1956
- The Vagabond King, 1956
- The Wrong Man, 1956
- The Spirit of St. Louis, 1957
- Vertigo, 1958
- The Black Orchid, 1958
- North By Northwest, 1959
- But Not for Me, 1959
- The Rat Race, 1960
- The Great Impostor, 1960
- The Pleasure of His Company, 1961
- The Music Man, 1962
- The Birds, 1963
- Marnie, 1964
- Once a Thief, 1965
- A Patch of Blue, 1965
- Waterhole#3, 1967

== Awards and nominations ==
Year	Award ceremony	Category	Recipients	Result	Ref.
1951	Academy Awards	Best Black-and-White Cinematography	Strangers on a Train	Nominated	
1954	Academy Awards	Best Color Cinematography	Rear Window	Nominated	
1955	Academy Awards	Best Color Cinematography	To Catch a Thief	Won	
1965	Academy Awards	Best Black-and-White Cinematography	A Patch of Blue	Nominated	
