= Flip Phillips =

American jazz saxophonist and clarinetist (1915–2001)

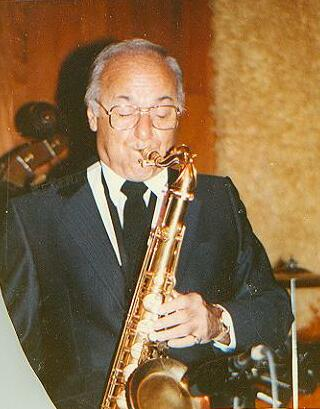
- Phillips at the Village Jazz Lounge in Walt Disney World

Background information
- Born: Joseph Edward Filippelli; March 26, 1915; Brooklyn, New York, U.S.
- Died: August 17, 2001 (aged 86) Fort Lauderdale, Florida, U.S.
- Genres: Jazz; mainstream jazz; swing; jump blues
- Occupation: Musician
- Instruments: Tenor saxophone; clarinet
- Years active: 1930s–1990s
- Labels: Clef; Verve; Chiaroscuro; Arbors; Grendel Records; Concord Jazz

Joseph Edward Filippelli (March 26, 1915 – August 17, 2001), known professionally as Flip Phillips, was an American jazz tenor saxophonist and clarinetist. He is best remembered for his work with Norman Granz's Jazz at the Philharmonic concerts from 1946 to 1957. Phillips recorded an album for Verve Records when he was in his 80s. He performed in a variety of genres, including mainstream jazz, swing, and jump blues.

== Career ==
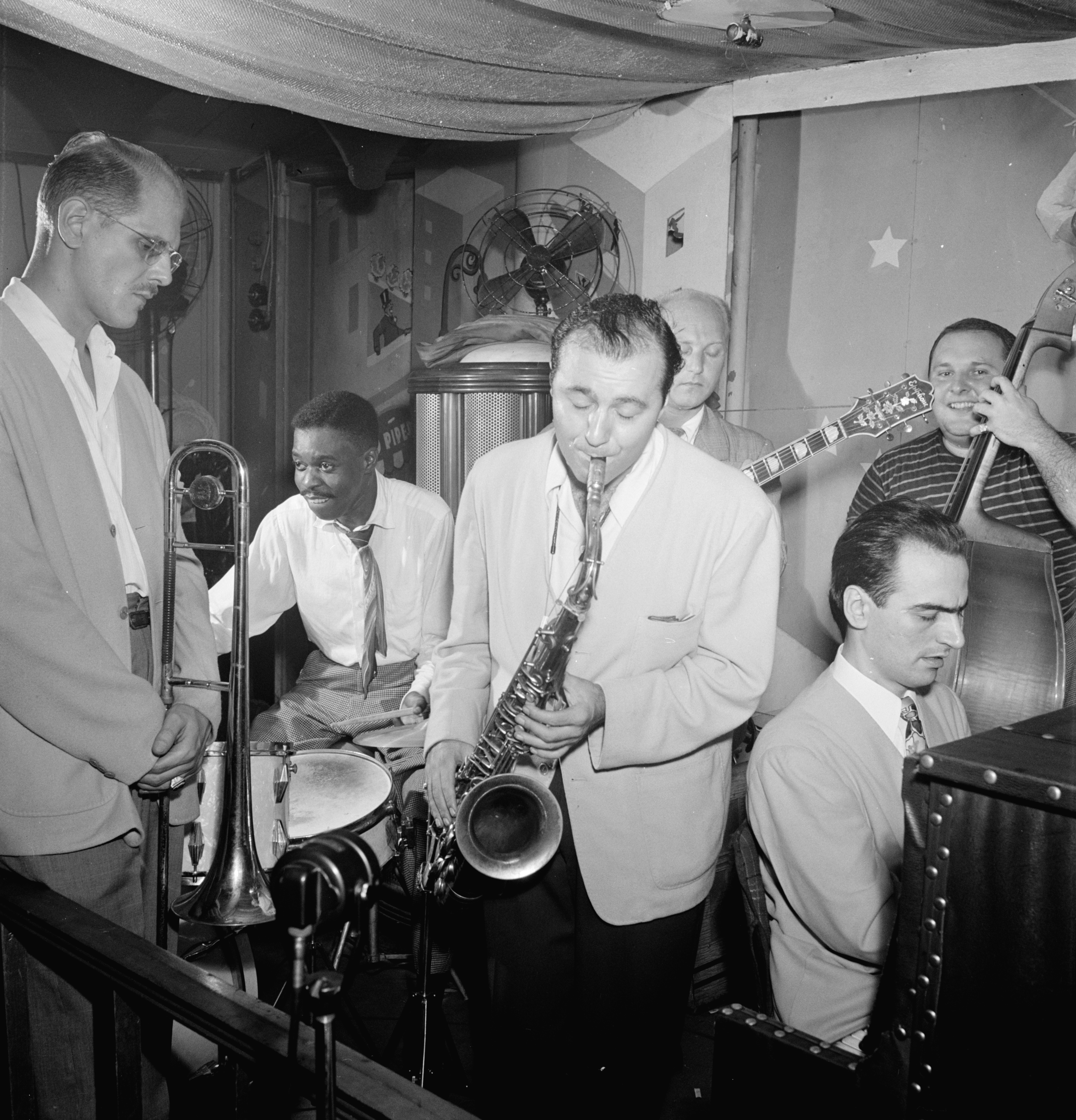
Phillips, with (from left) Bill Harris, Denzil Best, Billy Bauer, Lennie Tristano, and Chubby Jackson, at Pied Piper, NYC, 1947

Joseph Filippelli was born in Brooklyn, New York, United States. During the 1930s, Phillips played clarinet in a restaurant in Brooklyn. After that, he was a member of bands led by Frankie Newton, Red Norvo, Benny Goodman, and Wingy Manone. He was a regular soloist for the Woody Herman band in the middle 1940s and for the next ten years performed with Jazz at the Philharmonic. He made multiple appearances on recordings by Charlie Parker during this period. He retired to Florida, but after 15 years, he returned to music after relocating to New York, recording again and performing into his 80s.

He recorded extensively for Clef Records in the 1940s and 1950s, including a 1949 album of small-group tracks under his leadership with Buddy Morrow, Tommy Turk, Kai Winding, Sonny Criss, Ray Brown, and Shelly Manne. He accompanied Billie Holiday on her 1952 album Billie Holiday Sings.

He died in August 2001, in Fort Lauderdale, Florida, at the age of 86.

== Discography ==
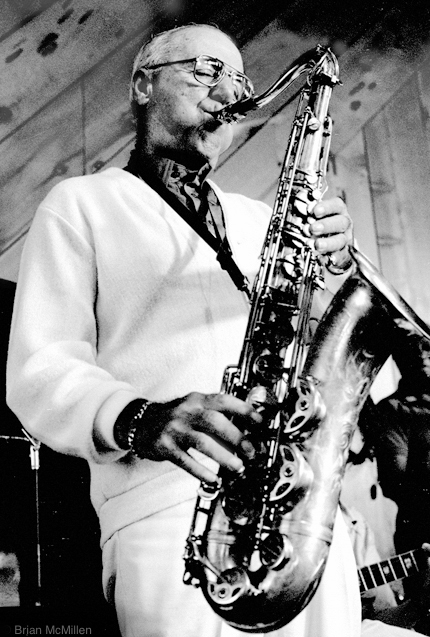
Phillips at Bach Dancing & Dynamite Society, Half Moon Bay, California, 1988

=== As leader ===
- Flip Phillips Collates (Clef, 1952)
- Flip Phillips Collates Vol. 2 (Clef, 1953)
- Flip Phillips Quartet (Mercury, 1953)
- Jumping Moods (Clef, 1954)
- Rock with Flip (Clef, 1954)
- The Flip Phillips Buddy Rich Trio (Clef, 1954)
- Flip Phillips Quintet (Clef, 1955)
- The Battle of the Saxes (American Recording Society, 1956)
- Flip (Clef, 1956)
- Flip Wails (Clef, 1956)
- Swingin' with Flip Phillips and His Orchestra (1956)
- Flip in Florida (Onyx, 1963)
- Your Place or Mine? (Jump, 1963)
- Flip Phillips Revisited (1965)
- Phillips's Head (Choice, 1975)
- John & Joe (Chiaroscuro, 1977)
- Live at the Beowulf (1978)
- Flipenstein (Progressive, 1981)
- The Claw: Live at the Floating Jazz Festival (Chiaroscuro, 1986)
- A Sound Investment with Scott Hamilton (Concord Jazz, 1987)
- A Real Swinger (Concord Jazz, 1988)
- Try a Little Tenderness (Chiaroscuro, 1992)
- Live at the 1993 Floating Jazz Festival (Chiaroscuro, 1993)
- Spanish Eyes (Candid, 1997)
- John & Joe Revisited (Chiaroscuro, 1999)
- Swing Is the Thing! (Verve, 2000)
- Celebrates His 80th Birthday at the March of Jazz 1995 (Arbors, 2003)
- Live at the Beowulf: Arbors Historical Series, Vol. 5 (Arbors, 2004)

=== As sideman ===
With Johnny Hodges

- In a Tender Mood (Norgran, 1952 [1955])

With Gene Krupa and Buddy Rich

- The Drum Battle (Verve, 1952 [1960])

With Charlie Parker

- Big Band (Clef, 1954)
