= Thomas Morris (musician) =

American jazz cornetist (1897–1945)

- Born: August 30, 1897; New York City, New York, U.S.
- Died: 1945 (aged 47–48) California, U.S.
- Genres: Jazz
- Occupation: Musician
- Instrument: Cornet
- Relatives: Marlowe Morris (nephew)

Thomas Morris (August 30, 1897 – 1945) was an American jazz cornetist. Jazz critic Scott Yanow noted that Morris's primitive style was "an excellent example of how New York brass players sounded before the rise of Louis Armstrong."

Morris was born in New York City. His many recordings include dates with Clarence Williams, Charlie Johnson, Fats Waller and many jazz and blues singers, including Mamie Smith, Eva Taylor and Sippie Wallace. His most notable dates were with his band, the Seven Hot Babies, producing eight songs in 1923 and ten in 1926.

For a time, Morris served as a porter at Grand Central Terminal. In the last few years of his life, he was associated with Father Divine's strict religious movement, changing his name to Brother Pierre. Sidney Bechet recalled an encounter with Morris in a radio interview with Wynne Paris, stating: "I happened to be walking down 132nd Street near Seventh Avenue when I saw Thomas Morris, and I was tickled to death to see him. I say, 'Hello Thomas.' He said, 'Not no more. I'm St. Peter.' I said, 'You might be St. Peter to Father Divine, but you're Thomas Morris to me.'"

Morris died in 1945 in California. He was the uncle of pianist Marlowe Morris.
