= Bumps Myers =

American jazz musician

Hubert Maxwell "Bumps" Myers (August 22, 1912, Clarksburg, West Virginia - March 2, 1968, Los Angeles) was an American jazz saxophonist. Known primarily as a tenor saxophonist, he also occasionally played alto and soprano sax.

Myers moved to southern California with his family when he was nine years old, and began playing with Curtis Mosby in the late 1920s. He played with Buck Clayton in the 1930s (including on a tour of China), as well as with Lionel Hampton and Les Hite. In the 1940s Myers played extensively with Benny Carter, as well as with Lester Young, Jimmie Lunceford, Sid Catlett, T-Bone Walker, Benny Goodman, and Russell Jacquet. He continued performing live and working as a session musician through the 1950s, with Jimmy Witherspoon, Helen Humes, Red Callender, Louie Bellson, and Harry Belafonte; he also worked with Horace Henderson in the early 1960s before retiring due to health problems. He was an Army private during World War 2 and is buried at the Los Angeles National Cemetery.
