= Marlowe Morris =

American musician (1915–1978)

- Born: May 16, 1915; New York City, New York, U.S.
- Died: May 28, 1978 (aged 63) New York City, New York, U.S.
- Genres: Jazz
- Occupation: Musician
- Instruments: Piano, Hammond organ
- Relatives: Thomas Morris (uncle)

Marlowe Morris (May 16, 1915 – May 28, 1978) was an American jazz pianist and organist. He was the nephew of musician Thomas Morris.

== Biography ==
Ad for Morris performance, 1947

Morris learned drums, harmonica, and ukulele as a child. He accompanied June Clark from 1935 to 1937, then played solo for a few years before playing with Coleman Hawkins in 1940–41. He served in the Army during World War II, then worked with Toby Browne, Al Sears, Sid Catlett, and Tiny Grimes in addition to leading his own trio in the early and middle 1940s; he also appeared in the film Jammin' the Blues in 1944. He quit playing full-time and worked in a post office later in the 1940s, then returned in 1949 to play primarily solo organ. He led a trio in the 1960s with Julian Dash as one of his sidemen, recording for Columbia Records.

Morris also recorded with Lester Young, Ben Webster, Big Joe Turner, Sister Rosetta Tharpe, Joe Williams and Jimmy Rushing.

From a review by radio disc-jockey Jim Bartlett of station Magic 98:

“Play the Thing”/Marlowe Morris Quintet (3/31/62, one week). Morris was a distant relative of jazz pianist Fats Waller. He played piano and organ (supposedly having learned from Waller) and recorded with jazz giants Coleman Hawkins, Lester Young, and Ben Webster, among others. His most famous credit might be the 1944 short film Jammin’ the Blues, which is beautifully shot and features some exquisitely tasty playing. “Play the Thing” features some tasty playing behind Marlowe, although his roller-rink organ style probably isn’t for everybody.

== Discography ==
- Play the Thing

With Joe Williams

- A Night at Count Basie's (Vanguard, 1956)

== Filmography ==
- Jammin' the Blues (1944)
