= Marie Bryant =

American dancer and singer (1917–1978)

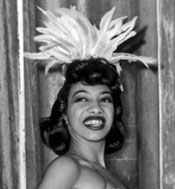
- Portrait from Los Angeles Herald Examiner 1944
- Born: November 6, 1917; Meridian, Mississippi, U.S.
- Died: May 23, 1978 (aged 60); Los Angeles, California, U.S.
- Occupations: Dancer; singer; choreographer
- Years active: 1934–1978
- Spouse: John A. Rajakumar (m. 1952; died 1965)

Marie Bryant (November 6, 1917 – May 23, 1978) was an American dancer, singer and choreographer, described as "one of the most vivacious black dancers in the United States".

== Biography ==
Bryant was born in Meridian, Mississippi, in 1917, moving with her family as a child to New Orleans, Louisiana.

By the age of 10, she was performing impersonations of Josephine Baker at her church. In her teens, Bryant's dance teacher, Mary Bruce, included her in her annual show at the Regal Theater in Chicago. Bryant made her professional debut with Louis Armstrong at the Grand Terrace Cafe in Chicago in 1934, and became a regular singer and dancer in the venue's floor shows. She then performed in Los Angeles with Lionel Hampton, and at the Cotton Club in New York City with Duke Ellington.

By 1939, she was a featured attraction at the Apollo Theater in Harlem, and toured nationally with Duke Ellington. In Los Angeles, she performed in Ellington's 1941 musical revue Jump For Joy, featuring the hit number "Bli Blip". She also appeared as the head of a dance troupe in the movie Carolina Blues (1944), and sang in the short film Jammin' the Blues (also 1944), accompanied by Lester Young, Barney Kessel and others. In 1946, she starred in the musical show Beggar's Holiday, with music by Ellington and lyrics by John LaTouche.

She worked as a teacher at the dance schools run by Katherine Dunham and Eugene Loring, where she taught actors, including Marlon Brando. In 1948, in Los Angeles, Bryant was a headline act at the Florentine Gardens (which rebranded itself The Cotton Club), where she taught burlesque and other routines to dancers in the chorus line. She appeared in the RKO movie They Live by Night (1948), as well as Betty Grable's 20th Century Fox film Wabash Avenue (1950), and toured the US in The Big Show of 1951 with Ethel Waters, Sarah Vaughan and Nat 'King' Cole. Bryant continued to teach dance to film actors, working with Gene Kelly – who called her "one of the finest dancers I've ever seen in my life" – Debbie Reynolds, Cyd Charisse, Betty Grable, Ava Gardner and others. Bryant worked as a dance coach and choreographer for Paramount, 20th Century Fox, MGM and Columbia, and developed her own dance teaching style which she called "controlled release".

Bryant continued to appear in musical shows into the early 1950s. In 1952, she toured with the Harlem Blackbirds, and married the company manager John A. Rajakumar. The following year, she appeared in London in the musical High Spirits, and performed around Europe, and in Australia and New Zealand. While in London in 1953, she performed a satirical anti-apartheid calypso song, "The Plea", with a refrain of "Don't malign Malan because he dislikes our tan", which created controversy at the time of South African Prime Minister D. F. Malan's visit to Britain to attend the Coronation of Queen Elizabeth II. Bryant returned to the US after Rajakumar became ill; he died in 1965.

In the 1970s, she ran the Marie Bryant Dance Studios, and was an understudy to Pearl Bailey in the stage show Hello, Dolly!. Bryant continued to work as a choreographer in Los Angeles and Las Vegas.

She died of cancer in Los Angeles in May 1978, at the age of 60.

== Partial filmography ==
- The Duke is Tops (1938)
- Bli Blip (1942; soundie)
- Jammin' the Blues (1944)
- When Strangers Marry (1944; uncredited)
- They Live by Night (1948)
- Tiger by the Tail (1955)
