= Sid Catlett =

American jazz drummer (1910–1951)

Big Sid Catlett
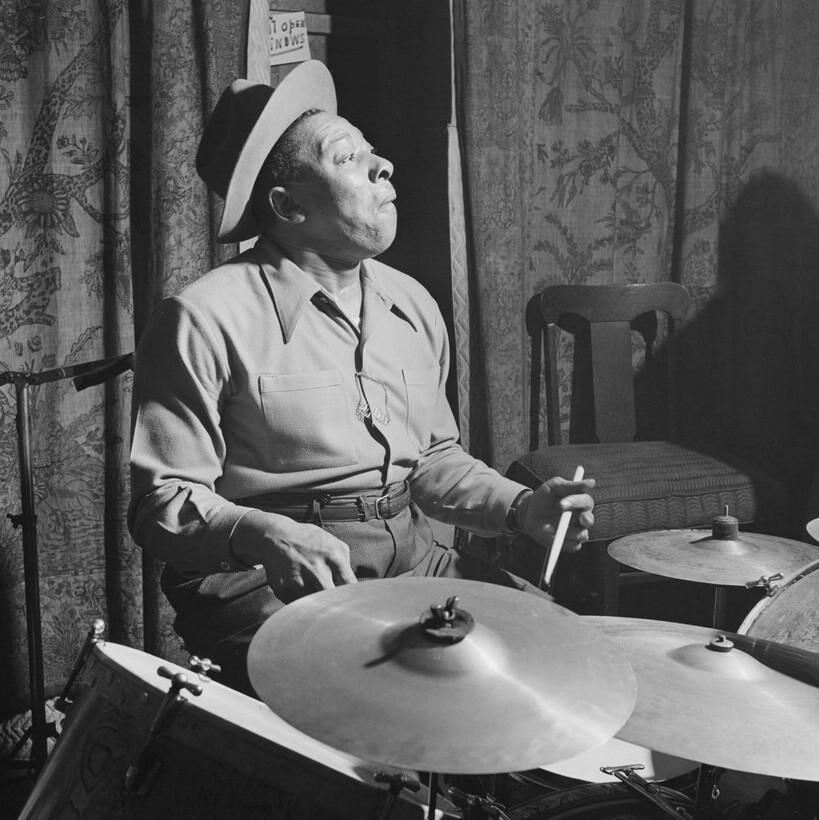
- Catlett in New York, March 1947.

Background information
- Also known as: "Big Sid" Catlett
- Born: Sidney Catlett; January 17, 1910; Evansville, Indiana; United States
- Died: March 25, 1951 (aged 41) Chicago, Illinois; United States
- Genres: Jazz; Bebop
- Occupation: Musician
- Instrument: Drums

Sidney "Big Sid" Catlett (January 17, 1910 – March 25, 1951) was an American jazz drummer. Catlett was one of the most versatile drummers of his era, adapting with the changing music scene as bebop emerged.

== Early life ==
Catlett was born in Evansville, Indiana, United States, and at an early age he was instructed in the rudiments of piano and drums, under the tutelage of a music teacher hired by his mother. When he and his family relocated to Chicago, Catlett received his first drum kit, and immersed himself in the diverse styles and techniques of Zutty Singleton, Warren "Baby" Dodds, and Jimmy Bertrand, among others.

== Later life and career ==
In 1928, Catlett began playing with violinist and clarinet player Darnell Howard, before joining pianist Sammy Stewart's Orchestra in New York City, and making appearances at the Savoy Ballroom.

After performing for several lesser established musical acts, Catlett began recording and performing with multiple musicians including Benny Carter, McKinney's Cotton Pickers, Fletcher Henderson, and Don Redman throughout the 1930s. Between 1938 and 1942, Catlett was Louis Armstrong's drummer of choice as he was regularly featured in Armstrong's big band, while also periodically joining Benny Goodman's group. Following a brief stint in collaboration with Duke Ellington in 1945, Catlett led some of his own bands through the remainder of the 1940s, and was involved in Armstrong's All-Stars between 1947 and 1949.

Catlett was one of the few drummers to successively transition into bebop, appearing on Dizzy Gillespie's progressive recordings in 1945. Catlett participated in the Gillespie-Charlie Parker segment of a New Jazz Foundation June 1945 concert at New York's Town Hall; a recording surfaced in 2005. In 1950, he performed with Hoagy Carmichael at the Copley Plaza Hotel. In early 1951, he began to suffer from pneumonia. In that same year, he died of a heart attack while visiting friends backstage at a Hot Lips Page benefit concert in Chicago, Illinois.

Catlett appeared on screen in the 1944 film Jammin' the Blues, but, as was common practice then, the soundtrack was not recorded during filming. Instead, the drum track was dubbed in later by Jo Jones.

In 1996, he was inducted into the Big Band and Jazz Hall of Fame.

Catlett's son Sid (1948–2017) was a professional basketball player, and played in the NBA.

== Style ==
Catlett was known as a tasteful, steady, supportive player who aimed to integrate his sound into that of the entire group. Earl Hines reflected: "He never overshadowed whoever was performing around him. He had a feeling for embellishment, for what you were doing in your solo, that made it seem like he knew what you were going to play before you did yourself." Whitney Balliett commented: "Catlett was supremely subtle. He implied more than he stated... yet he controlled every performance... His taste was faultless, his time was perfect..., and the sound he got on his drums was handsome, careful, and rich." Catlett would frequently ask soloists about their preferences: Dicky Wells recalled: "If you told him brushes, he'd play brushes. If you told him sticks, he'd play sticks. If you told him the Chinese cymbal, he'd play the Chinese cymbal." At the same time, Catlett injected a great deal of variety into his accompaniments, altering his accents in unexpected ways, and deriving a wide range of sounds from the drums.

Catlett's solos were known for giving the appearance of being highly structured, involving thematic variation and embellishment, and for the use of sudden, unexpected silences and a wide range of dynamics. Ruby Braff recalled: "Each solo had a beautiful sense of composition... And each solo sang its own song." Balliett noted that Catlett rarely repeated himself when soloing: his solos on alternate takes of a recording were always different, as were his solos when heard over the course of an evening, and from one night to the next.

Catlett was also somewhat of a showman. During a solo, he would bounce his sticks off the floor and catch them, dance around his drum set, and on occasion, throw a stick high in the air, light a cigarette, then catch the stick.

== Influence and tributes ==
A wide range of drummers, including Louie Bellson, Buddy Rich, Shelly Manne, Han Bennink, and Kenny Washington, have acknowledged Catlett's influence.

Art Blakey recalled: "He'd sit at the drum and make it sound like a butterfly – so pretty – it had nothing to do with loudness... Catlett could play just as soft with a pair of sticks as you can play with a pair of brushes. And Catlett could take the brushes and play with them like sticks... He was a master. I tried to pattern myself on him."

In a 1958 interview for DownBeat, Max Roach, who was onstage at the Chicago concert when Catlett died, stated that Catlett was his "main source of inspiration." Roach paid tribute to Catlett with his tune "For Big Sid," recorded on the album Drums Unlimited.

Regarding Catlett's influence, Connie Kay reflected: "We never actually sat down with the drumsticks and the drum pad or the drum book. But I got more out of him by sitting, just talking to him, not talking about drums, but about anything in general... We hung out together. Sorta just pals. And I really got a lot out of it."

Ed Shaughnessy commented: "He had a fantastic touch... Everything flowed. A lot of people say I look graceful when I play. I think that has a lot to do with having seen Sidney... the impression I got was that Sidney could play it all, and so sympathetically."

Sunny Murray stated that he was "influenced a bit spiritually by Sid Catlett... [I] believe that's still some part of my success, that the spirit of this man has been... part of me. I find now Catlett's spirit is one of the most liberating in music."

Charlie Watts included Catlett in a 2017 book devoted to his favorite drummers.

Lenny White and Mike Clark paid tribute to Catlett with their tune "Catlett Out of the Bag," recorded on the albums Anomaly and Carnival Of Soul.

== Partial discography ==
- Jam Sessions at Commodore (1951 LP)
- Sid Catlett 1944–1946 (compilation) (Classics, 1998)

With Ruth Brown

- Ruth Brown (Atlantic, 1957)

With Dizzie Gillespie and Charlie Parker

- Town Hall, New York City, June 22, 1945 (Uptown, 2005)

== Filmography ==
- Jammin' the Blues (1944)
- Boy! What a Girl! (1947)
- Sepia Cinderella (1947)
