= Solo Flight: The Genius of Charlie Christian =

Compilation album by Charlie Christian
- Released: 1972
- Recorded: October 1939 to March 1941
- Genre: Jazz, swing, big band, pre-bop
- Length: 94:21
- Label: Columbia
- Producer: Chris Albertson

Professional ratings
Review scores
| Source | Rating |
|---|---|
| Allmusic | 4/5 stars |

Solo Flight: The Genius of Charlie Christian is a 1972 double album collecting many of the few recordings that captured performances by Charlie Christian. Most of the selections are from sessions with Benny Goodman's bands. Until the advent of CD, it was considered to be the definitive "Charlie Christian" collection On some tunes, the producers spliced various takes together to include more of Christian's solos, or to create a better overall tune.

== Track listing ==
=== Side 1 ===
1. "Rose Room" (A. Hickman, H. Williams) – Benny Goodman Sextet - 2:45
2. "Memories of You" (E. Blake, A. Razaf) – Benny Goodman Sextet - 3:06
3. "Seven Come Eleven" (B. Goodman, C. Christian) – Benny Goodman Sextet - 2:46
4. "Honeysuckle Rose" (T. Waller, A. Razaf) - Benny Goodman and His Orchestra - 3:01
5. "All Star Strut" (Mergentroid) - Metronome All Star Nine - 3:10
6. "Till Tom Special" (B. Goodman, L. Hampton) - Benny Goodman Sextet - 3:00
7. "Gone With "What" Wind" (C. Basie, B. Goodman) - Benny Goodman Sextet - 3:20

=== Side 2 ===
1. "I Got Rhythm" (I. Gershwin, G. Gershwin) – Charlie Christian Quintet - 5:46. A combination of two separate recordings.
2. "Stardust" (H. Carmichael, M. Parish) – Charlie Christian Quintet - 5:30
3. "Tea for Two" (I. Caesar, V. Youmans) – Charlie Christian Quintet - 4:28. Above 3 are amateur recordings at a Minneapolis nightclub.
4. "Boy Meets Goy (Grand Slam)" (B. Goodman) – Benny Goodman Sextet - 2:50
5. "Six Appeal" (B. Goodman) - Benny Goodman Sextet - 3:18
6. "Good Enough to Keep (Air Mail Special)" (J. Mundy, B. Goodman, C. Christian) - Benny Goodman Sextet - 2:54
7. "Wholly Cats" (B. Goodman) - Benny Goodman and His Sextet featuring Count Basie - 3:03

=== Side 3 ===
1. "Wholly Cats" (B. Goodman) - Benny Goodman and His Sextet featuring Count Basie - 3:01
2. "As Long As I Live" (H. Arlen, T. Koehler) - Benny Goodman and His Sextet featuring Count Basie - 3:16
3. "Benny's Bugle" (B. Goodman) - Benny Goodman and His Sextet featuring Count Basie - 3:03
4. "Royal Garden Blues" (C. Williams, S. Williams) - Benny Goodman and His Sextet featuring Count Basie - 2:59
5. "Breakfast Feud" (B. Goodman) - Benny Goodman and His Sextet - 3:06
6. "I Can't Give You Anything But Love (Baby)" (D. Fields, J. McHugh) - Benny Goodman and His Sextet - 3:20
7. "Gilly" (B. Goodman) - Benny Goodman and His Sextet - 2:33

=== Side 4 ===
1. "Breakfast Feud" (B. Goodman) - Benny Goodman and His Sextet featuring Count Basie - 4:24
2. "On the Alamo" (G. Kahn, I. Jones) - Benny Goodman and His Sextet featuring Count Basie - 3:23
3. "I've Found a New Baby" (J. Palmer, S. Williams) - Benny Goodman and His Sextet featuring Count Basie - 3:00
4. "Solo Flight" (C. Christian, J. Mundy, B. Goodman) - Benny Goodman and His Orchestra - 2:45
5. "Blues in B" (B. Goodman) - Charlie Christian Jammers - 1:43
6. "Waitin' for Benny" (B. Goodman) - Charlie Christian Jammers - 5:06. The Jammers were actually members of the Benny Goodman Sextet; the above 2 tracks were warm-up recordings made by the Sextet on March 13, 1941, as they waited for the tardy bandleader.
7. "Good Enough to Keep (Air Mail Special)" (J. Mundy, B. Goodman, C. Christian) - Benny Goodman and His Sextet - 3:45

== Personnel ==
Musical

Track 1 Side 1 recorded in New York, 2 October 1939. Tracks 2 & 3 Side 1 recorded in New York 22 Nov 1939. Personnel (Benny Goodman Sextet):

- Benny Goodman — clarinet
- Lionel Hampton — vibes
- Fletcher Henderson — piano
- Charlie Christian — amplified guitar
- Artie Bernstein — bass
- Nick Fatool — drums

Track 4 Side 1 recorded in New York, 22 Nov 1939. Personnel (Benny Goodman and His Orchestra):

- Jimmy Maxwell, Ziggy Elman, Johnny Martel — trumpets
- Red Ballard, Vernon Brown, Ted Vesely — trombones
- Benny Goodman — clarinet
- Toots Mondello, Buff Estes — alto saxophones
- Bus Bassey, Jerry Jerome — tenor saxophones
- Fletcher Henderson — piano
- Charlie Christian — amplified guitar
- Artie Bernstein — bass
- Nick Fatool — drums

Track 5 Side 1 recorded in New York, 7 Feb 1940. Personnel was drawn from Metronome Magazine's annual reader's poll for the top instrumentalists. Metronome often gathered the winners (or near-winners) to record a few tracks together, and released the results on various record labels of the day. Metronome All Star Nine:

- Harry James — trumpet
- Jack Teagarden — trombone
- Benny Goodman — clarinet
- Benny Carter — alto saxophone
- Eddie Miller — tenor saxophone
- Jess Stacy — piano
- Charlie Christian — amplified guitar
- Bob Haggart — bass
- Gene Krupa — drums

Track 6 Side 1 recorded in New York, 7 Feb 1940. Personnel (Benny Goodman Sextet):

- Benny Goodman — clarinet
- Lionel Hampton — vibes
- Count Basie — piano
- Charlie Christian — amplified guitar
- Artie Bernstein — bass

Track 7 Side 1 recorded in New York, 7 Feb 1940. Personnel (Benny Goodman Sextet): Same as Track 6, adding:

- Nick Fatool — drums

Tracks 1–3 Side 2 recorded privately at a club in Minneapolis, MN, early Mar 1940, on acetate discs, by a local disc jockey. Personnel (Charlie Christian Sextet):

- Charlie Christian — amplified guitar
- Jerry Jerome — tenor saxophone
- Frankie Hines — piano
- unknown — bass, drums

Track 4 Side 2 recorded in Los Angeles, 16 Apr 1940. Personnel (Benny Goodman Sextet):

- Benny Goodman — clarinet
- Lionel Hampton — vibes
- Johnny Guarnieri — piano
- Charlie Christian — amplified guitar
- Artie Bernstein — bass
- Nick Fatool — drums

Tracks 5 & 6, Side 2 recorded in Los Angeles, 20 Jun 1940. Personnel (Benny Goodman Sextet):

- Benny Goodman — clarinet
- Lionel Hampton — vibes
- Dudley Brooks — piano
- Charlie Christian — amplified guitar
- Artie Bernstein — bass
- Nick Fatool — drums

Track 7, Side 2 recorded in New York, 7 Nov 1940. Personnel (Benny Goodman and His Sextet):

- Benny Goodman — clarinet
- Cootie Williams — trumpet
- George Auld — tenor saxophone
- Count Basie — piano
- Charlie Christian — amplified guitar
- Artie Bernstein — bass
- Harry Jaeger — drums

Tracks 1–4, Side 3 recorded in New York, 7 Nov 1940. Personnel (Benny Goodman and His Sextet featuring Count Basie):

- Benny Goodman — clarinet
- Cootie Williams — trumpet
- George Auld — tenor saxophone
- Count Basie] — piano
- Charlie Christian — amplified guitar
- Artie Bernstein — bass
- Harry Jaeger — drums

Tracks 5–7, Side 3 recorded in New York 19 Dec 1940. Personnel (Benny Goodman and His Sextet):

- Benny Goodman — clarinet
- Cootie Williams — trumpet
- George Auld — tenor saxophone
- Ken Kersey — piano
- Charlie Christian — amplified guitar
- Artie Bernstein — bass
- Harry Jaeger — drums

Tracks 1–3, Side 4 recorded in New York 15 Jan 1941. Personnel (Benny Goodman and His Sextet featuring Count Basie):

- Benny Goodman — clarinet
- Cootie Williams — trumpet
- George Auld — tenor saxophone
- Count Basie — piano
- Charlie Christian — amplified guitar
- Artie Bernstein — bass
- Jo Jones — drums

Track 4, Side 4 recorded in New York, 4 Mar 1941. Personnel (Benny Goodman and His Orchestra):

- Cootie Williams, Alec Fila, Jimmy Maxwell, Irving Goodman — trumpets
- Lou McGarity, Cutty Cutshall — trombones
- Skip Martin, Gus Bivona — alto saxophones
- Benny Goodman — clarinet
- George Auld, Pete Mondello — tenor saxophones
- Bob Snyder — baritone saxophone
- Johnny Guarnieri — piano
- Charlie Christian — amplified guitar
- Artie Bernstein — bass
- Dave Tough — drums

Tracks 5 & 6, Side 4 recorded in New York, 13 Mar 1941 during warm-up sessions while members of the Benny Goodman Sextet waited for their tardy leader. Columbia Records' practice at the time was to record all takes, partial takes, and sometimes warm-ups, onto acetate discs. These two performances were culled from one such disc. Personnel ("Charlie Christian Jammers"):

- Charlie Christian — amplified guitar
- Cootie Williams — trumpet (Track 6 only)
- George Auld — tenor saxophone
- Johnny Guarnieri — piano
- Artie Bernstein — bass
- Dave Tough — drums

Track 7, Side 4 recorded in New York, 13 Mar 1941. Personnel (Benny Goodman and His Sextet featuring Count Basie):

- Benny Goodman — clarinet
- Cootie Williams — trumpet
- George Auld — tenor saxophone
- Johnny Guarnieri — piano
- Artie Bernstein — bass
- Dave Tough — drums

Technical

- Chris Albertson - compilation producer, liner notes
- Gene Lees - liner notes
- John Hammond - liner notes
