= Metronome All-Stars =

Studio jazz band (c. 1939–1956)

The Metronome All-Stars were a collection of jazz musicians assembled for studio recordings by Metronome Magazine, based on its readers' polls. The studio sessions were held in the years 1939–42, 1946–53, and 1956, and typically consisted of two tracks which allowed each participant a chance to solo for one chorus. Earlier recordings feature more swing style, while the later sessions tend more toward bebop.

== Participants ==
- All Star Band 1939: "Blue Lou"/"The Blues", recorded by Bunny Berigan, Charlie Spivak, Sonny Dunham, Harry James, Tommy Dorsey, Jack Teagarden, Benny Goodman, Hymie Shertzer, Eddie Miller, Art Rollini, Carmen Mastren, Bob Haggart, Bob Zurke, Ray Bauduc.
- The Metronome All-Stars Nine 1940: "All-Star Strut" recorded by Harry James, Jack Teagarden, Benny Goodman, Benny Carter, Eddie Miller, Jess Stacy, Charlie Christian, Bob Haggart, Gene Krupa.
- Metronome All-Stars 1940: "King Porter Stomp", recorded by the same personnel as "All-Star Strut" plus Charlie Spivak, Jack Jenney, Toots Mondello, Charlie Barnet
- Metronome All-Stars 1941: "One O'Clock Jump"/"Bugle Call Rag", recorded by Harry James, Ziggy Elman, Cootie Williams, Tommy Dorsey, J. C. Higginbotham, Benny Goodman, Benny Carter, Toots Mondello, Coleman Hawkins, Tex Beneke, Count Basie, Charlie Christian, Artie Bernstein, Buddy Rich.
- Metronome All Star Band December 1941: "Royal Flush"/"Dear Old Southland", recorded by Harry James, Roy Eldridge, Cootie Williams, J.C. Higginbotham, Lou McGarity, Benny Goodman, Toots Mondello, Benny Carter, Vido Musso, Tex Beneke, Count Basie, Freddie Green, Doc Goldberg, Gene Krupa.
- Metronome All Star Leaders January 1942: "I Got Rhythm", recorded by Cootie Williams, J.C. Higginbotham, Benny Goodman, Benny Carter, Charlie Barnet, Alvino Rey, Count Basie, John Kirby, Gene Krupa.
- Metronome All-Stars January 1946: "Look Out"/"Metronome All-Out", recorded by Harry Edison, Cootie Williams, Sonny Berman, Pete Candoli, Rex Stewart, Neal Hefti, Tommy Dorsey, Will Bradley, Bill Harris, J.C. Higginbotham, Buddy De Franco, Johnny Hodges, Herbie Fields, Georgie Auld, Flip Phillips, Harry Carney, Teddy Wilson, Billy Bauer, Tiny Grimes, Chubby Jackson, Dave Tough, Sy Oliver, Red Norvo, Duke Ellington, Billy Strayhorn.
- Metronome All-Stars December 1946: "Sweet Lorraine"/"Nat Meets June", recorded by Charlie Shavers, Lawrence Brown, Johnny Hodges, Coleman Hawkins, Harry Carney, Nat King Cole, Bob Ahern, Eddie Safranski, Buddy Rich, Frank Sinatra, June Christy.
- Metronome All-Stars 1947: "Leap Here"/"Metronome Riff", recorded by Dizzy Gillespie, Bill Harris, Buddy DeFranco, Flip Phillips, Nat King Cole, Billy Bauer, Eddie Safranski, Buddy Rich, Stan Kenton and his orchestra.
- Metronome All-Stars 1949: "Overtime"/"Victory Ball", recorded by Dizzy Gillespie, Miles Davis, Fats Navarro, Jay Jay Johnson, Kai Winding, Buddy DeFranco, Charlie Parker, Charlie Ventura, Ernie Caceres, Lennie Tristano, Billy Bauer, Eddie Safranski, Shelly Manne, Pete Rugolo.
- Metronome All-Stars 1950: "Double Date"/"No Figs" recorded by Dizzy Gillespie, Kai Winding, Buddy DeFranco, Lee Konitz, Stan Getz, Serge Chaloff, Lennie Tristano, Billy Bauer, Eddie Safranski, Max Roach, Pete Rugolo.
- Metronome All-Stars 1951/52: "Local 802 Blues" / "Early Spring" recorded by George Shearing, Stan Getz, Miles Davis, Serge Chaloff, Lee Konitz, John LaPorta, Max Roach, Billy Bauer, Terry Gibbs, Eddie Safranski, Kai Winding, Billy Eckstine.
- Metronome All-Stars 1953: "How High the Moon"/"St. Louis Blues", recorded by Roy Eldridge, Kai Winding, John LaPorta, Warne Marsh, Lester Young, Teddy Wilson, Billy Bauer, Eddie Safranski, Terry Gibbs, Max Roach, Billy Eckstine.
- Metronome All-Stars 1956: "Billie's Bounce" recorded by Thad Jones, Eddie Bert, Tony Scott, Lee Konitz, Al Cohn, Zoot Sims, Gerry Mulligan, Serge Chaloff, Billy Taylor, Tal Farlow, Charles Mingus, Art Blakey; also four tracks by the Count Basie Big Band with guest Ella Fitzgerald and one piano solo by George Wallington.
