= Metronome (magazine) =

US jazz magazine

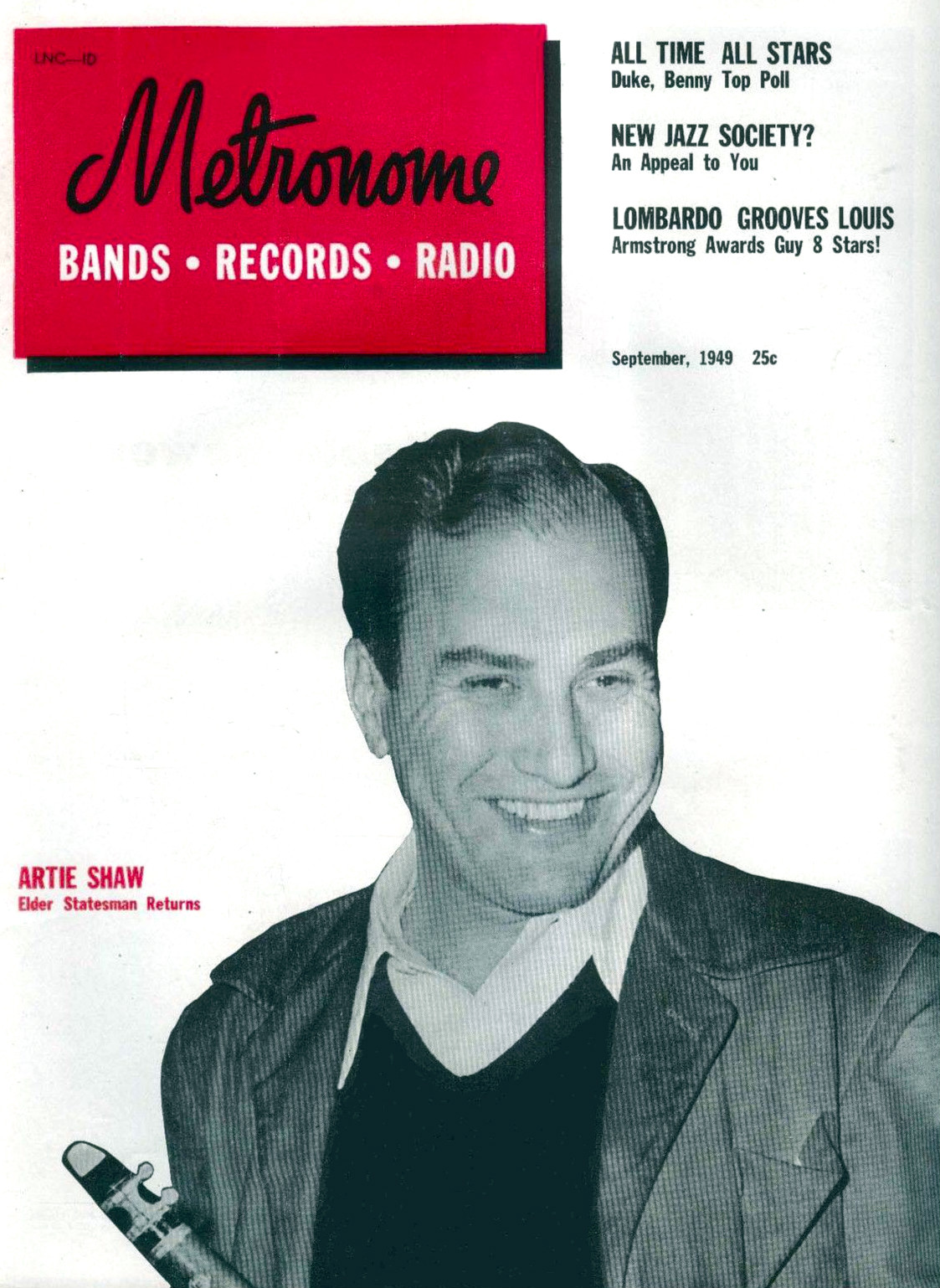
- Artie Shaw on the cover of the September 1949 issue
- Categories: music magazine
- Founded: January 1885 (Vol. 1, No. 1)
- Final issue: December 1961 (Vol. 78, No. 12)
- Country: United States
- Language: English

Metronome was a music magazine published from January 1885 to December 1961.

== History ==
=== Founding (1885) ===
Bandmaster Arthur Albert Clappé (1850–1920) first published The Metronome in January 1885 for band leaders. (Note: Arthur A. Clappé (1850–1920), M.M.C.M., was an Irish-born bandmaster, composer, and writer, who had studied at the Trinity College of Music and the Royal Military School of Music (graduating 1873), both of London. From 1877 to 1884, Clappé directed the Canadian Governor General's Foot Guards Band. He became a U.S. naturalized citizen in 1892. Clappé directed the Army Band at West Point from 1888 to 1895.(Trumpet Notes; August 1888) In 1911, the United States Army Music Training School was founded under his leadership at Fort Jay, Governors Island, Manhattan, which in 1921 was officially recognized as the United States Army School of Music and later relocated in Washington, D.C. Clappé served as editor of Metronome and Dominant. (White; 1944)) In 1891, Harry Coleman (1845–1895), a Philadelphia music publisher and publisher of a monthly music magazine The Dominant, invited Clappé to become its editor. He accepted, and Carl Fischer (1849–1923) took over The Metronome as publisher until 1914. Violinist Gustav Saenger (1865–1935) succeeded Clappé in 1904 as editor and also continued as editor of the Musical Observer – also published by Fischer. Saenger continued as Metronome's editor until 1928.

=== Shift towards popular music and jazz (1920s) ===
Metronome began to shift away from classical music in the 1920s, when it featured a "Saxophone Department," an instrument family that, by then, had become a symbol of American popular music. In 1932 – Doron Kemp Antrim (1889–1961), editor from 1928 through 1939 – the magazine's tagline read "For Orchestra, Band, Radio and Motion Picture Theatre Musicians."

Edgar Bitner (né Edgar Franklin Bitner; 1877–1939), who headed Leo Feist, Inc., after its founder's death, was, according to author Russell Sanjek, a Tin Pan Alley pioneer, who, with Julius P. Witmark and Nathan Burkan (1878–1936) (a founding father of intellectual property law), was one of ASCAP's honorary pioneer members. As a sideline, after retiring from Feist in 1936, Bitner took over publishing of Metronome and the Musical Courier, both of which his son, Edgar, Jr. (1912–1966), took over after his death.

Beginning with the swing era, Metronome focused primarily on the genre of Jazz music appealing to fans. Writers for the magazine were its co-editors, Leonard Feather and Barry Ulanov; Miles Davis cited them as the only two white music critics in New York to understand bebop.

George T. Simon, editor-in-chief from 1939 through 1955, sometimes wrote articles under the pseudonym Jimmy Bracken. He was a drummer. He changed the magazine's focus from articles on instrument-making and publishing to items about recordings and the noted big-band leaders of the day.

Bill Coss (né William Hungerford Coss, Jr.; 1925–1988), editor-in-chief from 1956 through 1960 – had earned a bachelor of science degree from Boston College in 1951. He was editor-in-chief of Jazz Today.

=== The demise of Metronome (1959–1961) ===
Metronome, under financial duress, was set to close after the December 1959 issue, but, in the words of author John Gennari, they "won a reprieve when photography editor Herb Snitzer prevailed upon his wife's uncle, Robert Asen, buy the defunct [sic] publication. Resuming operation under the leadership of Snitzer, editor Dave Solomon, and art director Jerry Smokler [né Herbert Jerold Smokler; born 1935], Metronome became, briefly, a hip, avant-garde publication that surrounded its jazz coverage with cutting-edge Beat literature, ... "politically-charged cartoons, and other innovative visual material."

Asen was Metronome's publisher and Milton Lichtenstein was president of the underlying publishing firm, Metronome Corporation, a wholly owned subsidiary of RMC Associates in New York founded in 1953 by Robert Hyman Asen (1910–1993), Milt Lichtenstein (né Milton Julian Lichtenstein; 1919–2005), and Charlie Sargent (né Charles Edmund Sargeant; 1903–1967). Saving Metronome was not RMC's primary mission. The primary mission of RMC's personnel was to serve as manufacturers' representatives and field engineers in (what some referred to as) the most concentrated territory in the world for electronic instrumentation and engineering component markets. RMC's clients included Hewlett-Packard, Western Electric, Bell Telephone Labs, Sperry Gyroscope, and Grumman Aircraft Engineering – and also unique clients such as the United Nations, Les Paul, and Mary Ford.

Asen, in December 1960, hired new managing editor David Solomon (1925–2007), who had been an editor at Esquire and Playboy in the 1950s.

"Trouble came in July 1961 when a cover photograph of a Coney Island female stripper [and an accompanying article by Snitzer with more provocative photos] raised the ire of high school librarians, five or six-hundred of whom cancelled their subscriptions. Solomon was fired, Dan Morgenstern took over, and the magazine reverted to straight jazz coverage."

The final issue of Metronome was printed in December 1961 (Volume 78, No. 12).

== Metronome All-Stars Band ==
Metronome magazine conducted an annual poll during the years 1939-1961 to choose the musicians whom their readers considered as the top jazz instrumentalists, for that year, playing each instrument. Often, the Metronome organization recorded the all-stars on a regular basis, with recording sessions of the bands chosen in 1939-1942, 1945–1950, 1953, and 1956.

In many cases, the all-stars group recorded two songs, with short solo performances, from nearly all of the participants.

In 1940, Metronome magazine organized the Metronome All Star Nine, including Harry James, Jack Teagarden, Benny Carter, Jess Stacy, Charlie Christian and Gene Krupa.

The all-stars band had several name variations: Metronome All Star Nine; Metronome All Stars; Metronome All Stars 1956; The Metronome All-Stars; or Metronome Allstars.

== Metronome Hall of Fame series ==
The following artists were inducted into Metronome's Hall of Fame series. According to jazz musician and Metronome contributor George T. Simon, the series "was designed to recognize sidemen, not leaders", but "quite a number of these sidemen eventually wound up as leaders".

Metronome Hall of Fame inductees
Date	Name	Primary instrument	Ref.
May 1935	Gene Krupa	Drums	
Jan 1936	Bud Freeman	Saxophone (tenor)	
Feb 1936	Red Norvo	Xylophone	
Mar 1936	Glenn Miller	Trombone	
Jun 1936	Bunny Berigan	Trumpet	
Jul 1936	Eddie Miller	Saxophone (tenor)	
Sep 1936	Teddy Wilson	Piano	
Oct 1936	Charlie Spivak	Trumpet	
Dec 1936	Jack Teagarden	Trombone	
Jan 1937	Ray McKinley	Drums	
May 1937	Carmen Mastren	Guitar	
Jun 1937	Dave Tough	Drums	
Jul 1937	Yank Lawson	Trumpet	
May 1938	Harry James	Trumpet	
Aug 1940	Will Bradley	Trombone	
Feb 1941	Irving Goodman	Trumpet	
Apr 1941	Ziggy Elman	Trumpet	
May 1941	Irving Fazola	Clarinet	
Jun 1941	Cozy Cole	Drums	
Jun 1941	Cootie Williams	Trumpet	
Sep 1941	Wolfe Taninbaum	Saxophone (tenor)	
Oct 1941	Roy Eldridge	Trumpet	
Jan 1947	Louis Armstrong	Trumpet	
Feb 1947	Benny Goodman	Clarinet	
Mar 1947	Mildred Bailey	Vocals	
Apr 1947	Duke Ellington	Piano	
Aug 1947	Charlie Christian	Guitar	

== Earlier publication by the same name ==
An earlier publication, The Metronome: A Monthly Review of Music, was published in Boston by White & Goullaud from April 1871 to May 1874 → Ambrose W. Davenport, Jr. (1838–1906), Editor, assisted by his brother, Warren Davenport (1840–1908). LCCN sf91-92226; OCLC 809454726 (all editions).

== See also ==
- Metronome All-Stars

== Bibliography ==
=== References ===
- Berger, Ed (March 28–29, 2007). "Dan Morgenstern Oral History" (recording & transcript – 83 pages). Smithsonian – National Museum of American History.
- Billboard; Rolontz, Bob (May 9, 1960). "Music as Written" – "New York" – "Metronome Magazine ... ".. 72 (19). Nielsen Business Media: 31 – via Internet Archive.
- Davis, Miles; Troupe, Quincy (1989). Miles – The Autobiography – Miles Davis with Quincy Troupe. Simon & Schuster – via Internet Archive. LCCN 90-37501.
- Discogs. "Metronome All-Stars Band Discography". Discogs.com (overview).
- Fidler, Linda M.; James, Richard, eds. (1990). International Music Journals → Entry: "Metronome". Greenwood Press. pp. 229–232. ISBN 9780313250040 – via Internet Archive (Boston Public Library). LCCN 89-11842; ISBN 0-3132-5004-9; OCLC 19888058 (all editions).
- Gennari, John Remo, PhD (born 1960 (2006). Blowin' Hot and Cool: Jazz and Its Critics (limited preview). University of Chicago Press. p. 174 – via Google Books. OCLC 701053921 (all editions)
- Henry, John (November 2002). "Jazz CDs, Pt. 1" (AA-NOV02).
- Jacobs' Band Monthly; Seltzer, Frank R. [in Dutch] (July 1919). "Famous Bandmasters in Brief: Capt. Arthur A. Clappe". 4 (7): 10 – via Google Books.
  Frank R. Seltzer was Cornetist with John Philip Sousa's bank on its initial tour in 1892, with the Philadelphia Orchestra for four seasons, and toured with Conway's band.
- Measure (August 1963). "RMC – The East Side Story" (a monthly magazine for the Hewlett-Packard family of affiliated companies): 3–5. OCLC 832430092.
- Merriam, Alan P. (1970) [1st pub. 1954]. A Bibliography of Jazz (Reprint ed.). New York: Da Capo Press. ISBN 0-306-70036-0 – via the Internet Archive (registration required).
- NYU Law Magazine; Smith, Erin Geiger (2014). "A Founding Father of IP Law" (blog; annual publication).. 24. New York University School of Law: 36. OCLC 41417547 (all editions), 935217972.
- Sadjedy, Vashti Gray; Kitson, Richard (2011). "The Metronome (Boston, 1871–1874)". RIMP – Retrospective Index to Music Periodicals (1760–1966).. RIPM.
- Sanjek, Russell (1916–1986) (1988). American Popular Music and Its Business: The First Four Hundred Years – From 1900–1984 (limited preview). Vol. 3 (of 3). Oxford University Press. pp. 113–114 – via Google Books. (alternate link via Internet Archive). Oxford University Press. 1988. ISBN 978-0-19-802127-8. OCLC 960166150 (all editions)
  Note: Sanjek was a longtime executive at BMI and is the father of music educator David Sanjek
- Simon, George T. (1971). Simon Says: The Sights and Sounds of the Swing Era 1935–1955. New York: Galahad Books. ISBN 0-88365-001-0 – via the Internet Archive.
- Snitzer, Herb (2011). "The Demise of Metronome". Glorious Days and Nights: A Jazz Memoir (limited preview). University Press of Mississippi. p. 36 – via Google Books. LCCN 2010-30989; OCLC 1200882422 (all editions).
- Teicher, Jordan G. (August 11, 2015). "Rare Photographs of Jazz Icons From the Archives of Metronome Magazine". Slate.
- Trumpet Notes (August 1888). "Personal".. 15 (8). Elkhart, Indiana: Review Printing Company: 7 (column 3, paragraph 2) – via Google Books (University of Minnesota). LCCN unk84151931 ; OCLC 475893370.
- Welburn, Ron (Autumn 1987). "Jazz Magazines of the 1930s: An Overview of Their Provocative Journalism". American Music. 5 (3). University of Illinois Press: 255–270. doi:10.2307/3051735. JSTOR 3051735. JSTOR 3051735; ISSN 0734-4392 (publication); OCLC 6733330569, 7376919917 (article).
- White, William Carter (1881–1964) (1944). "Biographies" – "Arthur A. Clappe". A History of Military Music in America. New York: The Exposition Press. pp. 141–146 – via Internet Archive (Marygrove College). LCCN 62-2882; LCCN 45-35142; OCLC 605544108 (all editions) (reprint by Greenwood Press).
