= Flying Home =

Song by Benny Goodman Sextet
- Recorded: November 6, 1939
- Genre: Jazz
- Composers: Lionel Hampton, Benny Goodman
- Lyricist: Sid Robin

Official audio
- "Flying Home" on YouTube

"Flying Home" is a jazz and jump blues composition written by Benny Goodman and Lionel Hampton with lyrics by Sid Robin.

== Background ==
Hampton conceived the melody while playing in the Benny Goodman band. While waiting for a plane to travel from Los Angeles to Atlantic City, on what would be Hampton's first flight, he began whistling a tune to relieve his nerves. Goodman asked for the tune's name and Hampton replied; "I don't know. We can call it 'Flying Home,' I guess." The Goodman Quartet played it for the first time that evening, and later recorded the first version of the full song, with a guitar solo by Charlie Christian. Hampton subsequently adopted the song as his musical signature.

Other musicians on the original recording were Fletcher Henderson on piano, Artie Bernstein on bass and Nick Fatool on drums.

== Recordings ==
It was first recorded by the Benny Goodman Sextet on November 6, 1939, featuring solos by Hampton and Charlie Christian. Several other groups recorded the tune:

- Charlie Barnet and His Orchestra recorded the song on May 8, 1940, released on Bluebird Records B-10794 as the B-side of "Tangleweed 'Round My Heart".
- In 1942, Lionel Hampton and His Orchestra recorded the song with an epic-length tenor saxophone solo by nineteen-year-old Illinois Jacquet. The song became the climax for live shows, with Jacquet expected to repeat his famous solo, note-by-note.
- Singer Chris Connor recorded the song for Atlantic Records and released it as a single in 1959.
- Harry James recorded a version in 1965 on his album New Versions of Down Beat Favorites (MGM).
- Ella Fitzgerald recorded a seven-minute-plus version for the album Digital III at Montreux (1979). Lullabies of Birdland includes another version by Fitzgerald that The New York Times called "one of the most influential vocal jazz records of the decade. ... Where other singers, most notably Louis Armstrong, had tried similar improvisation, no one before Miss Fitzgerald employed the technique with such dazzling inventiveness."

== Accolades and other uses ==
- "Flying Home" is mentioned in The Autobiography of Malcolm X (1965) and a Lindy Hop dance arrangement is featured in the film Malcolm X (1992).
- In 1996, it won a Grammy Hall of Fame Award.
- Ralph Ellison named a short story (1944) after the song that became the title of a posthumous collection.
- Flying Home (1978) is the title of a novel by Morris Lurie who uses references to jazz in his stories.
