= Nick Fatool =

American drummer

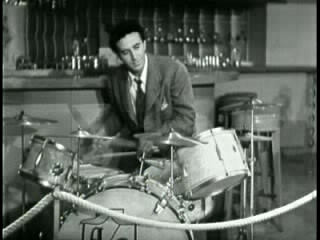
- Fatool in Second Chorus, 1940

Background information
- Born: January 2, 1915; Millbury, Massachusetts, U.S.
- Died: September 26, 2000 (aged 85) Los Angeles, California, U.S.
- Genre: Jazz
- Occupation: Musician
- Instrument: Drums
- Formerly of: Benny Goodman; Artie Shaw

Nick Fatool (January 2, 1915 – September 26, 2000) was an American jazz drummer.

== Music career ==
Born in Millbury, Massachusetts, Fatool first played professionally in Providence, Rhode Island, which he followed with time in Joe Haymes's band in 1937 and Don Beston's in Dallas soon after. In 1939, he played with Bobby Hackett briefly, and then became a member of the Benny Goodman Orchestra. He became one of the most visible drummers of the 1940s, playing with Artie Shaw (1940–41), Alvino Rey (1942–43), Claude Thornhill, Les Brown, and Jan Savitt.

In 1943, he moved to Los Angeles and took work as a session musician, recording profusely. Credits include Harry James, Erroll Garner (1946), Louis Armstrong (1949, 1951), Jess Stacy, Tommy Dorsey, Matty Matlock, John Scott Trotter and Glen Gray. He began an association with Bob Crosby, playing with him regularly between 1949 and 1951 and occasionally with Crosby's Bobcats into the 1970s.

Between January 7, 1944 and April 23, 1958, Fatool played on sessions for the following Capitol Records artists: Andy Griffith, Andy Russell, Betty Hutton, Billy May, Jeanne Gayle, Charles LaVere, Dave Barbour, Dave Matthews, Dean Martin, Maggie Jackson, Ella Mae Morse, Frank Sinatra, Freddie Slack, Gordon MacRae, Jack Teagarden, Jerry Colonna, Jesse Price, Jo Stafford, Joe "Fingers" Carr, Johnny Mercer, Johnny Standley, Margaret Whiting, Marvin Ash, Nat King Cole, Paul Weston, Peggy Lee, Pete Kelly, Ray Anthony, Ray Turner, Red Nichols, Robert Mitchum, Tennessee Ernie Ford, The Andrews Sisters, The Dinning Sisters, The Pied Pipers, The Starlighters, The Capitol Jazzmen, and Wingy Manone.

Fatool was an important member of Buddy Cole and his Trio which worked with Bing Crosby from 1954-1960. In the 1950s and 1960s, Fatool found much work on the Dixieland jazz revival circuit, playing with Pete Fountain from 1962–1965 and the Dukes of Dixieland. His only session as a bandleader was as the head of a septet in 1987, leading Eddie Miller, Johnny Mince, Ernie Carson, and others.

Fatool died in Los Angeles, California, at the age of 85.

== Partial discography ==
=== As leader ===
- Nick Fatool's Jazz Band (1987)

=== As sideman ===
- For You, for Me, Forever, Artie Shaw (Musicraft, 1946)
- Sweet and Hot, Ella Fitzgerald (Decca, 1953)
- Jam Session: Coast to Coast, Eddie Condon (1953)
- Never Before...Never Again, Joe Venuti (1954)
- A Musical Autobiography, Bing Crosby (Decca, 1954)
- Irving Berlin's White Christmas, Rosemary Clooney (Columbia, 1954)
- Coast Concert, Bobby Hackett (Capitol, 1955)
- Pete Kelly's Blues, Ray Heindorf (1955)
- Mellow Guitar, George Van Eps (1956)
- Hoagy Sings Carmichael, Hoagy Carmichael (Pacific Jazz, 1956)
- Casa Loma in Hi-Fi, Glen Gray and the Casa Loma Orchestra (Capitol, 1956)
- Dream Street, Peggy Lee (Decca, 1957)
- And They Called It Dixieland, Matty Matlock (1958)
- Ragtime Classics, Wally Rose (1959)
- South Rampart Street Parade, Pete Fountain (Coral, 1963)
- Standing Room Only, Pete Fountain (Coral, 1965)
- That Man, Robert Mitchum, Sings, Robert Mitchum (1967)
- Portrait of Eddie, Eddie Miller (1971)
- California Doings, Dick Cary (Famous Door, 1981)
- California Session, Bud Freeman (1982)
- The Banjo Kings (1986)
- The Genius of the Electric Guitar, Charlie Christian (1987)
- Starring Fred Astaire, Fred Astaire (Columbia, 1989)
- On the Trail, Frankie Laine (1990)
- 1939–1940, Lionel Hampton (Chronological Classics, 1991)
- 1938–1939, Ziggy Elman (Chronological Classics 1996)
