= Gibson ES-250 =

Electric guitar model

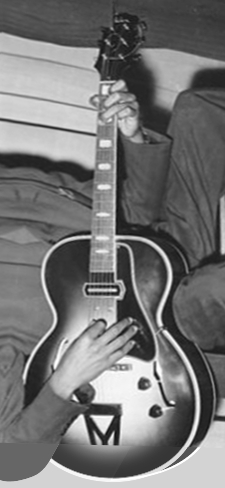
- Manufacturer: Gibson

Woods
- Neck: Maple
- Fretboard: Rosewood

The Gibson ES-250 was the second edition of the Gibson ES-150 amplified guitar, though released in several different versions. It had 17" body width and a 21" body length. It had a curly maple back and a spruce top with a maple neck and rosewood fingerboard. It was used in combination with the Gibson EH-185 and EH-275 amplifier.

== History ==
=== First Version ===
The first version from 1939 is seen in a popular photograph with Charlie Christian. It had a sunburst finish and a 19 fret fingerboard and stair-stepped headstock and featured "open book" fret markers. It was released for sale that year.

=== Second Version ===
The second version can also be seen in photographs of Charlie Christian. It had a natural finish and a twenty fret fingerboard and slight variations on the Charlie Christian pickup, as it has come to be known. It became available by 1940.

=== Third Variant ===
What is called the 3rd variant resembled a Gibson L7 with a Charlie Christian pickup. It had flower pot fret markers and an ornate headstock. Other variants with differing models of the tailpiece appeared in the short period this guitar was manufactured.

== Gallery ==
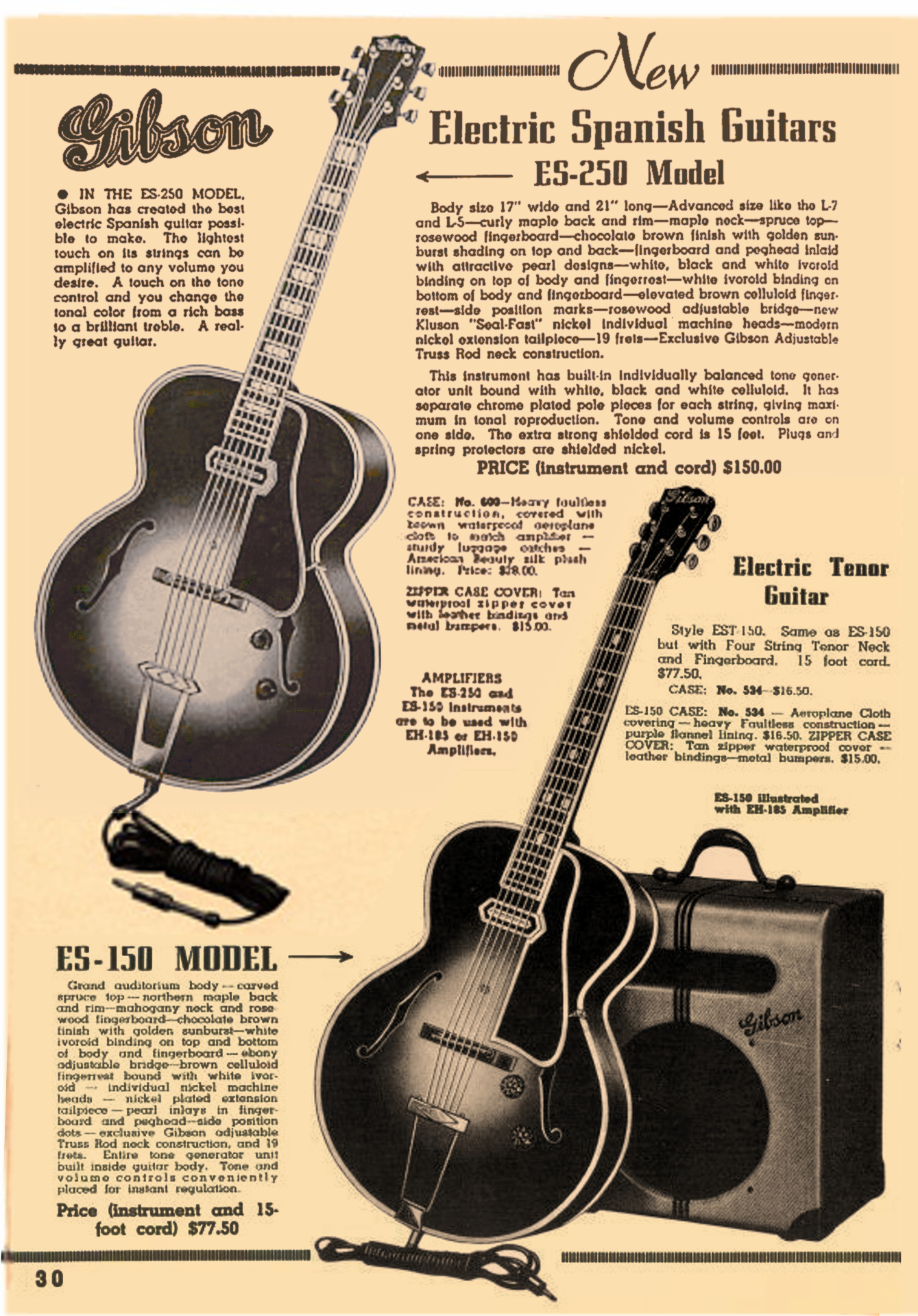
Magazine advertisement for ES150 and ES250

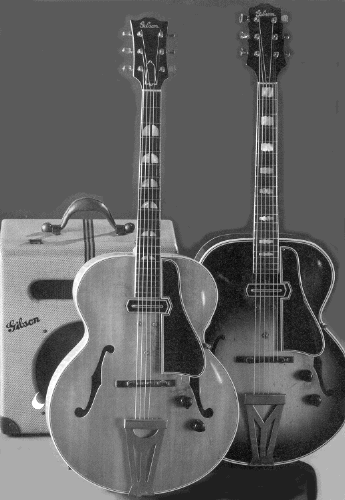
Another variant (on the left)
