= Charlie Christian =

American swing and jazz guitarist (1916–1942)

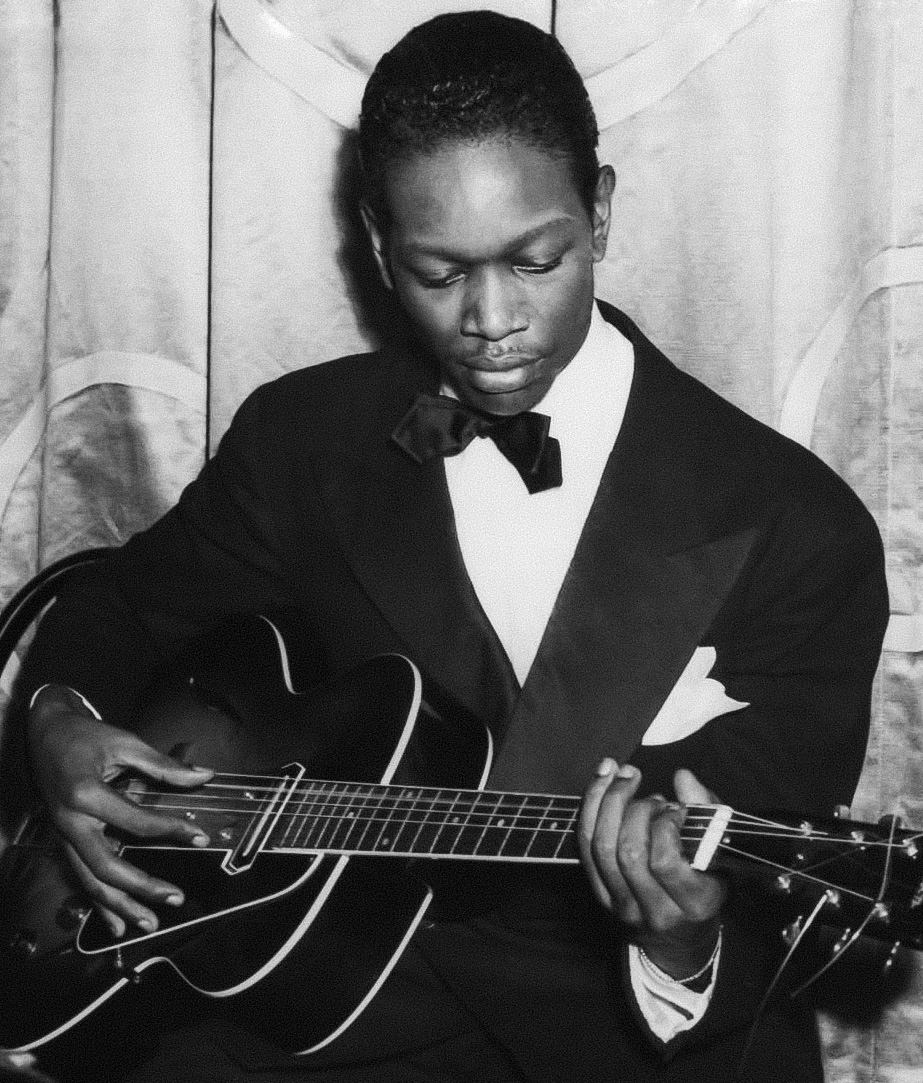
- Christian performing at the Waldorf Astoria New York, October 1939

Background information
- Born: Charles Henry Christian; July 29, 1916; Bonham, Texas, U.S.
- Died: March 2, 1942 (aged 25) New York City, U.S.
- Genres: Jazz; swing; bebop
- Occupation: Musician
- Instrument: Electric guitar
- Years active: 1930s–1941

Charles Henry Christian (July 29, 1916 – March 2, 1942) was an American swing and jazz guitarist. He was among the first electric guitarists and was a key figure in the development of bebop and cool jazz. He gained national exposure as a member of the Benny Goodman Sextet and Orchestra from August 1939 to June 1941. His single-string technique, combined with early adoption of the electric guitar, helped bring the guitar out of the rhythm section and into the forefront as a solo instrument. For this, he is often credited with pioneering the development of the lead guitar role.

== Early life ==
Christian was born on July 29, 1916, in Bonham, Texas. His family moved to Oklahoma City, Oklahoma, when he was a young child. His parents were musicians. He had two brothers: Edward, born in 1906, and Clarence, born in 1911. Edward, Clarence, and Charlie were all taught music by their father, Clarence Henry Christian. Clarence Henry was struck blind by fever, and in order to support the family, he and the boys worked as buskers, on what the Christians called "busts". He would have them lead him into the better neighborhoods, where they would perform for cash or goods. When Charles was old enough to go along, he at first entertained by dancing. Later, he learned to play the guitar, inheriting his father's instruments upon his death when Charles was 12.

He attended Frederick A. Douglass High School in Oklahoma City, where he was further encouraged in music by instructor Zelia N. Breaux. Christian wanted to play tenor saxophone in the school band, but Breaux insisted he play the trumpet instead. As he believed playing the trumpet would disfigure his lip, he quit to pursue his interest in baseball, at which he excelled.

In a 1978 interview with biographer Craig McKinney, Clarence Christian said that in the 1920s and 1930s, Edward Christian led a band in Oklahoma City as a pianist and had a shaky relationship with the trumpeter James Simpson. Around 1931, Simpson instructed guitarist "Bigfoot" Ralph Hamilton to secretly school the younger Charles in jazz. Hamilton taught him to solo on three songs—"Rose Room", "Tea for Two", and "Sweet Georgia Brown". When the time was right, he took Charles to one of the many after-hours jam sessions along Deep Deuce (a district in Oklahoma City), where Edward's band was performing, and after some encouragement, Edward allowed Charles to play. Edward was surprised that Charles knew the tunes, which were well received by the club.

Charles soon was performing locally and on the road throughout the Midwest, including states as far away as North Dakota and Minnesota. By 1936, he was playing electric guitar and had become a regional attraction. According to the record producer John Hammond, Christian jammed with many of the big-name performers traveling through Oklahoma City, including Teddy Wilson, Art Tatum, and Mary Lou Williams, the pianist for Andy Kirk and His Clouds of Joy.

== Career ==
=== National fame ===
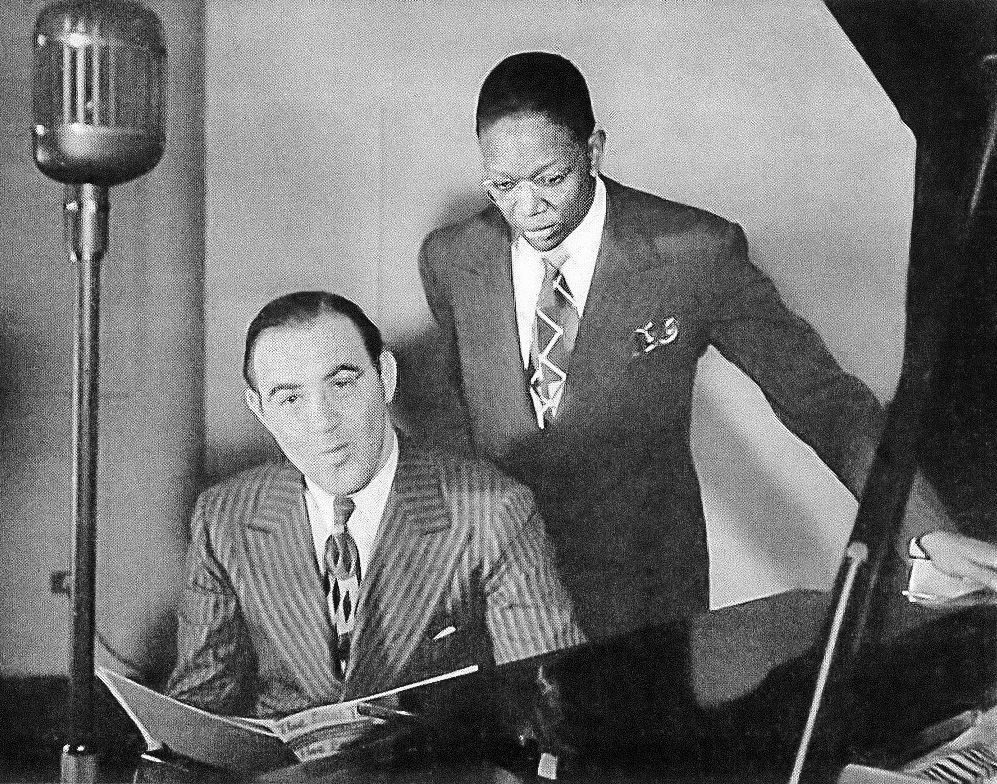
Benny Goodman and Christian in a recording studio, April 1941

In 1939, Christian auditioned for John Hammond, who recommended him to bandleader Benny Goodman, who was only the fourth white bandleader to feature Black musicians in his live band. Goodman had previously heard electric guitarists Leonard Ware and Floyd Smith, among others, and he unsuccessfully tried to buy Smith's contract from bandleader Andy Kirk.

There are multiple accounts of Christian and Goodman's first meeting. The former recalled in a 1940 article in Metronome magazine, "I guess neither one of us liked what I played." Despite this, Christian claimed that Goodman invited him to a show that evening. According to another account, Hammond decided to install Christian as the band's guitarist without consulting Goodman.

Goodman's band, including Christian on guitar, played that night at the Victor Hugo restaurant in Los Angeles. The bandleader called "Rose Room", a tune he assumed Christian did not know. However, Christian knew the tune and took an unprecedented twenty choruses of improvisation; Goodman hired him as a member of the band as a result. In the course of a few days, Christian went from making $2.50 a night to $150 a week.

Christian joined the newly formed Goodman Sextet in September 1939, which included Lionel Hampton, Fletcher Henderson, Artie Bernstein, and Nick Fatool.

Amateur recordings made in September 1939 in Minneapolis, Minnesota, by Jerry Newman, a Goodman aficionado, capture the newly hired Christian while on the road with Goodman and feature Goodman's tenor saxophonist Jerry Jerome and then-local bassist Oscar Pettiford. Taking multiple solos, Christian shows much the same improvisational skills later captured on the Minton's and Monroe's recordings in 1941, suggesting that he had already matured as a musician. The Minneapolis recordings include "Stardust", "Tea for Two", and "I Got Rhythm", the latter a favorite of bop composers and jammers.

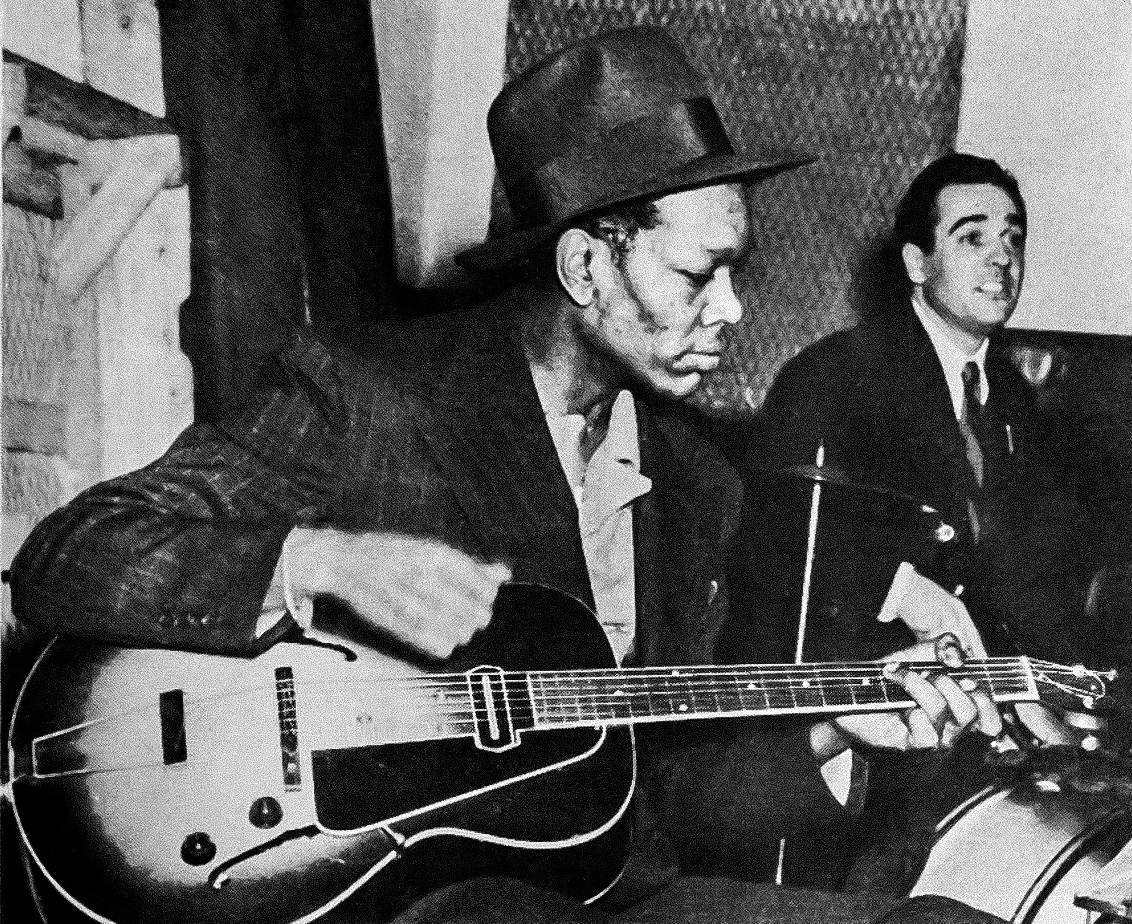
Christian with Gene Krupa at Columbia Studios during a Metronome All-Stars session (February 7, 1940)

By February 1940, Christian dominated the jazz and swing guitar polls and was elected to the Metronome All-Stars. In the spring of 1940, Goodman laid off most of his band but retained Christian, and in the fall of that year Goodman led a sextet with Christian, Count Basie, longtime Duke Ellington trumpeter Cootie Williams, former Artie Shaw tenor saxophonist Georgie Auld, and later drummer Dave Tough. This all-star band dominated the jazz polls in 1941, including another election to the Metronome All-Stars for Christian.

His work on the Goodman sextet sides "Soft Winds", "Till Tom Special", and "A Smo-o-o-oth One" show his use of few well-placed melodic notes. His work on the Sextet's recordings of the ballads "Stardust", "Memories of You", "Poor Butterfly", "I Surrender Dear", and "On the Alamo" and his work on "Profoundly Blue" with the Edmond Hall Celeste Quartet (1941) show hints of what was later called cool jazz. Although credited for very few, Christian composed many of the original tunes recorded by the Benny Goodman Sextet.

=== Bebop and Minton's Playhouse ===
Christian was an important contributor to the music that became known as bebop. Some of the participants in early after-hours affairs at Minton's Playhouse club at 210 West 118th Street in Harlem credit Christian with the name "bebop", citing his humming of phrases as the onomatopoeic origin of the term.

Examples of Christian's bebop playing can be heard in a series of recordings made at Minton's Playhouse by Jerry Newman, a student at Columbia University, on a portable disk recorder in 1941, in which Christian was accompanied by Joe Guy on trumpet, Kenny Kersey on piano, and Kenny Clarke on drums. Christian's use of tension and release, a technique employed by Lester Young, Count Basie, and later bop musicians, is also present on Newman's recording of "Stompin' at the Savoy". Further recordings were made in 1941, shortly before Christian's illness and death, at Clark Monroe's Uptown House, another late-night jazz haunt in Harlem, with Oran "Hot Lips" Page. Other recordings include the tenor saxophone player Don Byas. Beboppers Dizzy Gillespie and Thelonious Monk were regulars at the jam sessions, with Monk a regular in the Minton's house band.

Kenny Clarke claimed that "Epistrophy" and "Rhythm-a-Ning", both credited to Monk, were actually written by Christian. The "Rhythm-a-Ning" line is heard on "Down on Teddy's Hill" and behind the introduction on "Guy's Got to Go" from the Newman recordings. It is also a line from Mary Lou Williams's "Walkin' and Swingin'". Clarke further commented that Christian first showed him the chords to "Epistrophy" on a ukulele.

The Minton's and Uptown House recordings have been packaged under a number of different titles, including After Hours and The Immortal Charlie Christian. On the recordings, Christian can be heard taking multiple choruses on a single tune, playing long stretches of melodic ideas with ease.

== Personal life ==
Christian fathered a daughter, Billie Jean Christian (December 23, 1932 – July 19, 2004) by Margretta Lorraine Downey of Oklahoma City.

In the late 1930s, Christian contracted tuberculosis, and in early 1940, he was hospitalized for a short period in which the Goodman group was on hiatus because of Goodman's back trouble. Goodman was hospitalized in the summer of 1940 after a brief stay at Santa Catalina Island, California, where the band stayed when they were on the West Coast.

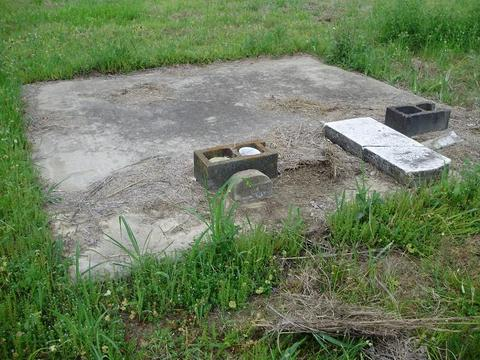
Probable grave site for Christian at Gates Hill Cemetery, Bonham, Texas

Christian returned home to Oklahoma City in late July 1940 and returned to New York City in September 1940. In early 1941, Christian resumed his hectic lifestyle, heading to Harlem for late-night jam sessions after finishing gigs with the Goodman Sextet and Orchestra in New York City. In June 1941, he was admitted to Seaview Hospital, a tuberculosis sanatorium on Staten Island. He was reported to be making progress, and DownBeat magazine reported in February 1942 that he and Cootie Williams were starting a band.

After a visit to the hospital that same month by a "musician friend", Christian declined in health. He died of tuberculosis on March 2, 1942, at the age of 25. He was buried in an unmarked grave in his hometown of Bonham, Texas. A Texas State Historical Commission Marker and headstone were placed in Gates Hill Cemetery in 1994. The location of the historical marker and headstone was disputed, and in March 2013, Fannin County, Texas, recognized that the marker was in the wrong spot and that Christian is buried under a concrete slab, as claimed by his brother Clarence.

== Style and influences ==
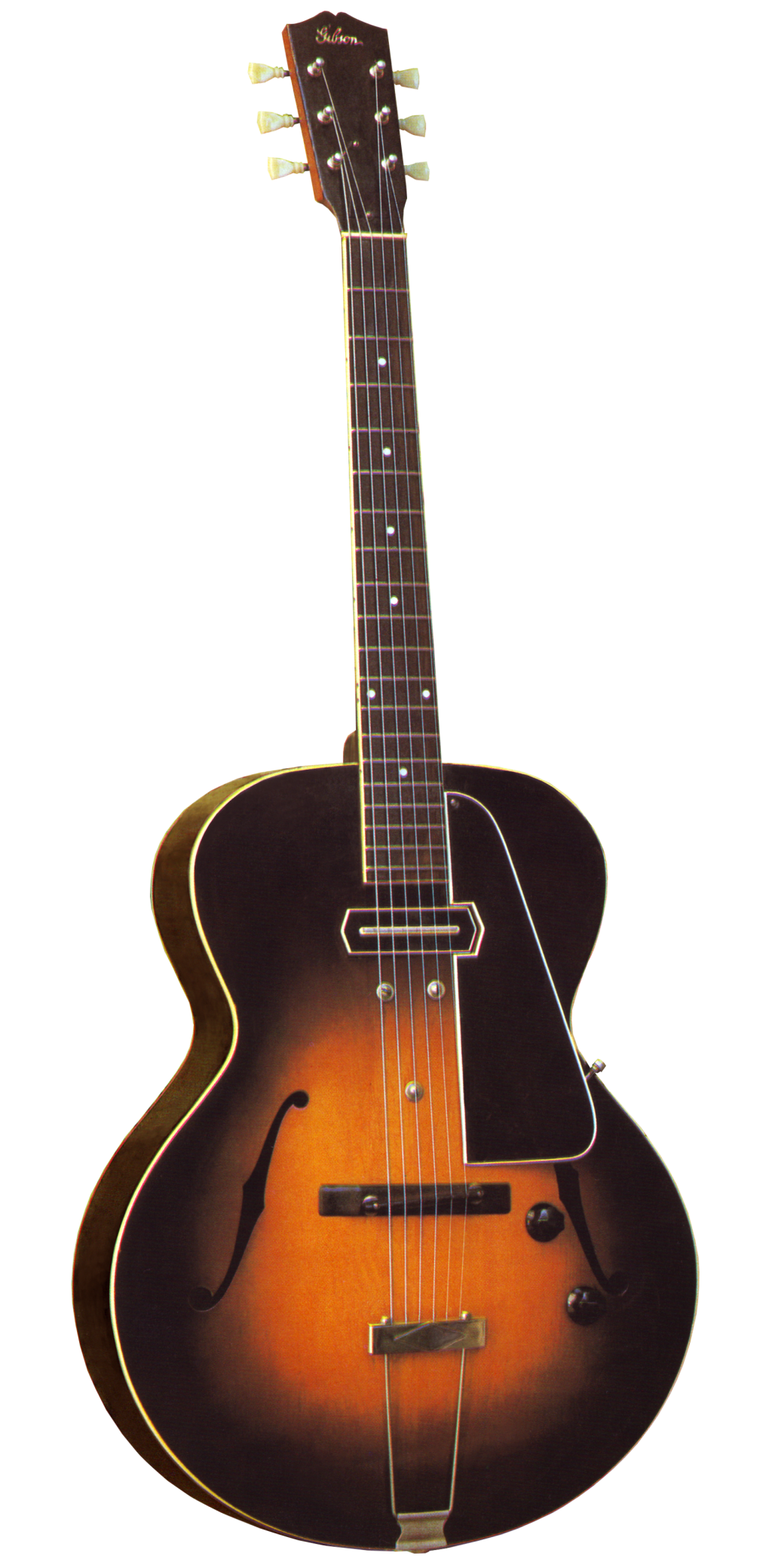
The Gibson ES-150, the guitar model most associated with Christian

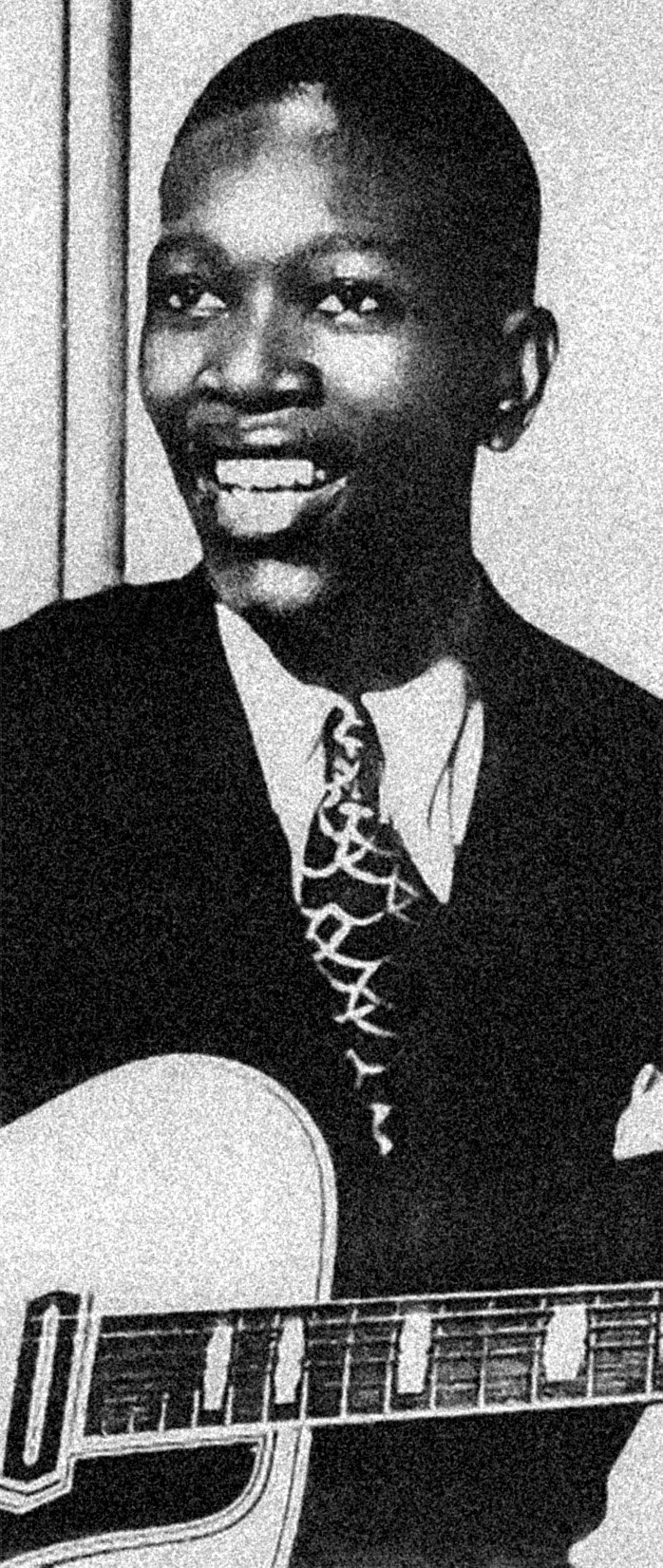
Christian playing guitar in-studio, summer 1940

Christian is widely regarded as one of the most influential pioneers of jazz guitar. His solos are frequently described as "horn-like", and in that sense, he was more influenced by horn players such as Lester Young and Herschel Evans than by guitarists like Eddie Lang or Lonnie Johnson. Christian himself stated that he wanted his guitar to sound like a tenor saxophone. The pioneering French jazz guitarist Django Reinhardt had little influence on him, but he was familiar with some of Reinhardt's recordings. Guitarist Mary Osborne recalled hearing him play Reinhardt's solo on "Saint Louis Blues" note for note, but then following it with his own ideas.

By 1939, there had already been electric guitar soloists—Leonard Ware; George Barnes; Eddie Durham, who had recorded with Count Basie; Floyd Smith, who recorded "Floyd's Guitar Blues" with Andy Kirk and his Clouds of Joy in March 1939, using an amplified lap steel guitar; and the western swing pioneer Eldon Shamblin, who was playing with Bob Wills and his Texas Playboys. However, Christian paved the way for the modern electric guitar sound that was followed by other pioneers in jazz and rock, including T-Bone Walker, Eddie Cochran, Cliff Gallup, Scotty Moore, Franny Beecher, B. B. King, Chuck Berry, Carlos Santana, and Jimi Hendrix. For this reason, Christian was inducted in 1990 into the Rock and Roll Hall of Fame.

Christian's exposure was so great in the brief period he played with Goodman that he influenced not only guitarists but other musicians as well. The influence he had on Dizzy Gillespie, Charlie Parker, Thelonious Monk, and Don Byas can be heard on their early bop recordings including "Blue 'n' Boogie" and "Salt Peanuts". Miles Davis also cited Christian as an early influence. Christian still reigned supreme in the jazz guitar polls for up to two years after his death. Black Sabbath's first manager Jim Simpson described the band's first song, "A Song for Jim", as an "absolute Charlie Christian takeoff."

== Instruments ==
- Epiphone Deluxe guitar (an acoustic archtop guitar), 1934–1937
- Gibson ES-150 guitar (sunburst finish, with dot inlays on the fingerboard), and EH-150 amplifier, 1937 or 1939 – April 1940
- Gibson ES-250 guitar (custom built by Gibson with a natural finish, a Super 400 tailpiece, and bowtie inlays on the fingerboard), April 1940 – February 1941. This instrument was re-discovered in 2002.
- Gibson ES-250 guitar (custom built by Gibson with a natural finish, an L-7 style neck, and custom inlays on the fingerboard), February 1941 – March 1942
- Gibson L-5 guitar (custom built by Gibson with a "Charlie Christian pickup" instead of a P-90). This guitar was delivered to Christian just prior to his death in March 1942. It was later owned by Tony Mottola.

The bar-style pickup used on the ES-150 and ES-250 became known as the "Charlie Christian pickup".

== Legacy ==
Charlie Christian Avenue in Oklahoma City, Oklahoma

John Hammond and George T. Simon called Christian the best improvisational talent of the swing era. In the liner notes to the album Solo Flight: The Genius of Charlie Christian (Columbia, 1972), Gene Lees wrote that "Many critics and musicians consider that Christian was one of the founding fathers of bebop, or if not that, at least a precursor to it."

In 1966, 24 years after his death, Christian was inducted into the DownBeat Jazz Hall of Fame. In 1989, the Oklahoma Jazz Hall of Fame created its first seven inductions, which included Christian.

In 1990, Christian was inducted into the Rock and Roll Hall of Fame in the "Early Influence" category.

In a 1985 interview with Frets magazine, Jerry Garcia named Christian and Django Reinhardt as the two guitarists who most inspired his awe and emulation.

In 2006, Oklahoma City renamed a street in its Bricktown district "Charlie Christian Avenue".

== Discography ==
Christian never recorded as a leader. Compilations have been released of his sessions as a sideman in which he is a featured soloist, of practice and warm-up recordings for these sessions, and some lower-quality recordings of Christian's own groups performing in nightclubs, by amateur technicians.

With Benny Goodman

- Charlie Christian with the Benny Goodman Sextet and Orchestra (Columbia, 1955)
- Solo Flight: The Genius of Charlie Christian (Columbia, 1972)
- The Genius of the Electric Guitar, 1939–1941 recordings (Columbia, 1987)
- The Benny Goodman Sextet Featuring Charlie Christian 1939–41 (Columbia, 1989)
- Solo Flight, with the Benny Goodman Sextet (Vintage Jazz Classics, 1991)
- Guitar Wizard (Le Jazz / Charly, 1993)
- Complete Studio Recordings (Definitive, 2000) 4-CD box set
- Complete Live Recordings (Definitive, 2001) 4-CD box set
- Radioland 1939–1941 (Fuel 2000 / Varèse Sarabande, 2001)
- The Genius of the Electric Guitar (Columbia/Legacy, 2002) 4-CD box set
- First Master of the Electric Guitar: Selected Broadcasts & Jam Sessions, Remastered (JSP, 2002) 4-CD box set
- Charlie Christian – The Original Guitar Genius (Proper, 2005) 4-CD box set
- The Genius of the Electric Guitar (Definitive, 2005)
- Solo Flight: Live! with the Benny Goodman Sextet (Definitive, 2008)
- On the Air (Fuel 2000 / Varèse Sarabande, 2009)
- Yale University Archives, Vol. 5: NBC Broadcast Recordings 1936–1943 (Nimbus, 2010)
- Electric, with the Benny Goodman Sextet and the Charlie Christian Quartet (Uptown, 2011)

With Lionel Hampton

- The Complete Lionel Hampton 1937–1941 (Bluebird, 1976) 6-LP box set

With others

- From Spirituals to Swing – Carnegie Hall Concerts 1938/39 (Vanguard, 1959) 2-LP

== Filmography ==
- 2005: Solo Flight: The Genius of Charlie Christian
- 2007: Charlie Christian – The Life & Music of the Legendary Jazz Guitarist (Grossman Guitar Workshop)
