= Peg Meyer's Melody Kings =

Peg Meyer’s Melody Kings
- Origin: Cape Girardeau, Missouri
- Genres: swing, jazz
- Years active: 1919 – c. 1925
- Members: Jess Stacy (piano); Martell Lovell(violin/trombone); Bergman Snider(drums); Peg Meyer (saxophone); Bill Gadbois(clarinet)

The Peg Meyer’s Melody Kings were a late 1910s through early 1920s Missouri swing band.

The band got its start in 1919 during lunch hour at Cape Central High School gym, in Cape Girardeau, Missouri. The band was initially called the Agony Four. It consisted of four players: Jess Stacy (piano), Martell Lovell (violin and trombone), Bergman Snider (drums), and Raymond F. "Peg" Meyer (soprano sax). Within the year, the band would be joined by Bill Gadbois on the clarinet. The name Agony Four lasted only a short time before the more marketable Peg Meyer's Melody Kings was chosen.

As is expected with a new band, the Agony Four would practice any place that would allow them and had an in-tune piano, most frequently practicing at Cape Central High School, the Bluebird Confectionery on Broadway and Fountain, and the Sweet Shop on Main Street.

The musicians had very little access to arrangements, so they learned the majority of their pieces by ear, spending hours listening to the new invention the radio, as well as spending time in the local record shop. A few of their pre-arranged pieces included "Fidgety Feet", "Clarinet Marmalade" and "Tiger Rag".

This was the Roaring Twenties and the Peg Meyer Melody Kings embraced much of the wildness of the era, or at least as much as their parents allowed them. Berg Snider had over 50 hats that he would wear to various concerts and Jess Stacy became a master at playing the piano while squatting on the piano stool.

The Peg Meyer Melody Kings or Agony Four only produced one album. According to Peg Meyer, there was a company that produced an aluminum disc that was soft enough to take the imprint of vibrations off of an ordinary reproducer and record it. Jess Stacy’s father, Fred Stacy, operated the recorder. Although the album has been lost, the players are known. It featured Jess Stacy on piano, Lovell on violin, Meyer on the sax, and Snider on the drums.

The band unofficially broke up in spring 1921 when Meyer and Stacy received jobs playing on the Majestic steamboat. The two joined the Harvey Berry band, only playing as the Peg Meyer's Melody Kings when back in their home town. Later Meyer and Stacy were joined by Berg Snider and moved from the Majestic to playing on packet boats. This lasted a few years before the band once again moved away from each other.

Jess Stacy moved to Chicago to pursue a career in music. He would become very successful, eventually playing at Carnegie Hall with the Benny Goodman Orchestra. Meyer stayed for a few more years on the riverboats, where he met Helen Evans. He moved back to Cape Girardeau and married her. Peg Meyer would go on to work and co-own Shivelbine’s, a music store that has operated in Cape Girardeau for the past fifty years.

The history of the band was recorded by Peg Meyer in a book entitled Backwoods Jazz in the Twenties.
