= Gibson ES-150 =

Electric Guitar

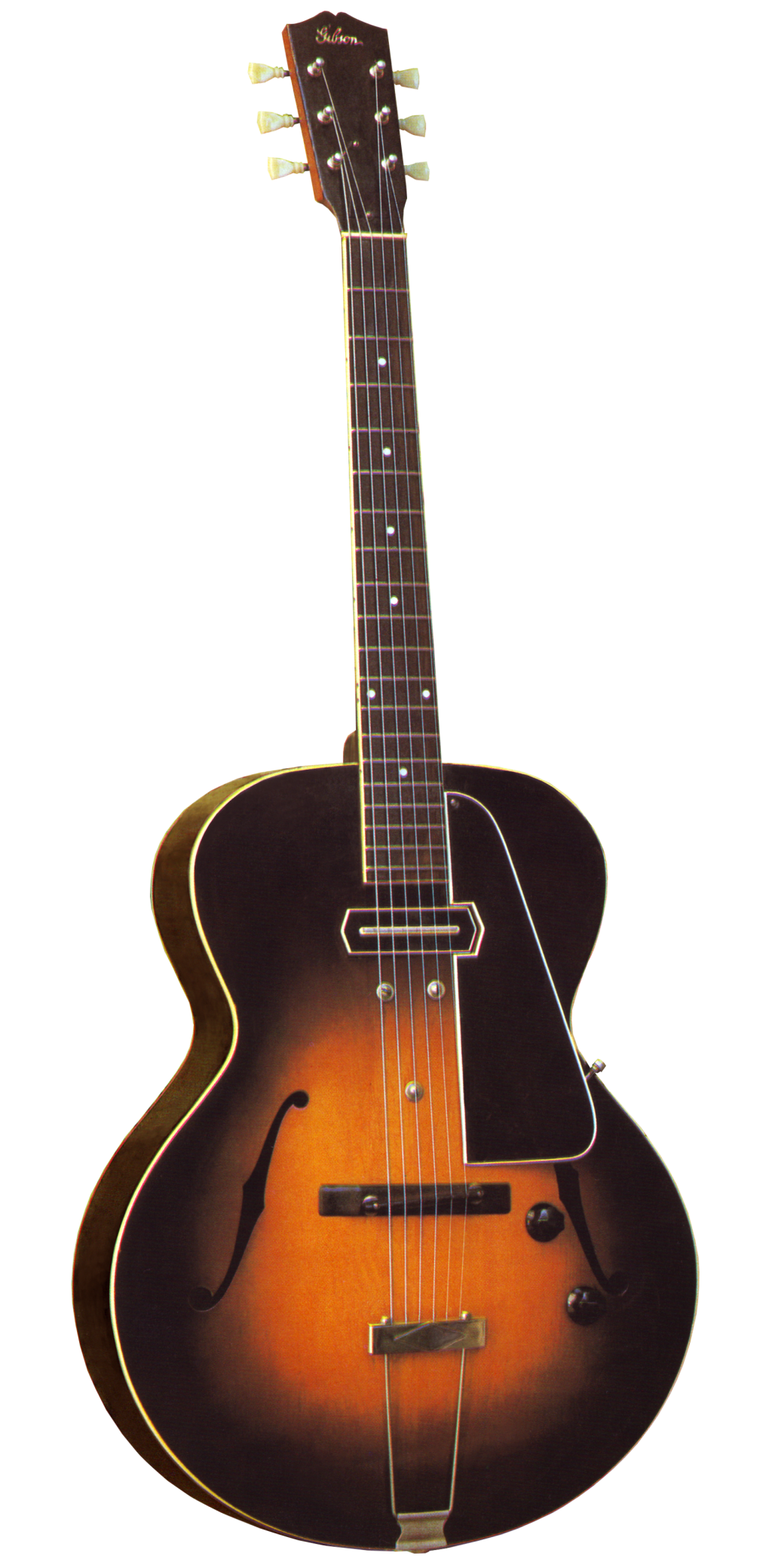
- Gibson ES 150 "Charlie Christian"
- Manufacturer: Gibson
- Period: 1936–1940 (V1); 1940–1957 (V2)

Construction
- Body type: Hollow
- Neck joint: Set
- Scale: 24 3/4 inches (63 cm)

Woods
- Body: 16 1/4 inches (41 cm) wide, solid spruce archtop, solid maple back and sides
- Neck: Mahogany
- Fretboard: Rosewood with pearl dot inlays

Hardware
- Bridge: Ebony archtop-style bridge adjustable for height
- Pickup: One steel magnet blade-type single coil in the neck position (Charlie Christian pickup)

Colors available
- Sunburst

The Gibson ES-150 is a pioneering electric guitar produced by Gibson Guitar Corporation. Introduced in 1936, it is generally recognized as the world's first commercially successful Spanish-style electric guitar. The ES stands for Electric Spanish, and Gibson designated it "150" because they priced it (in an instrument/amplifier/cable bundle) at around $150 (equivalent to $3,400 in 2024). The particular sound of the instrument came from a combination of the specific bar-style pickup and its placement, and the guitar's overall construction.

Unlike the usual acoustic guitars in jazz bands of the period, it was loud enough to take a more prominent position in ensembles. Upon its debut it immediately became popular with such notable guitar players as Charlie Christian, spreading its renown. Gibson produced the guitar with minor variations until 1940, when the ES-150 designation (the "V2") denoted a model with a different construction and pickup.

== History ==
Gibson's previous electrified guitars were either primitive piezoelectric systems or sold as an add-on for their traditional line of acoustic guitars.

The ES-150 was preceded by Gibson adding ancillary piezo pickups to its regular acoustic guitars. The company had developed an electromagnetic pickup in 1935 (the now-famous "bar pickup", named for its shape), which was initially factory-installed only on lap steel guitar (EH) models, then offered as an accessory and finally installed on acoustic guitars (the L-00 and L-1 models).

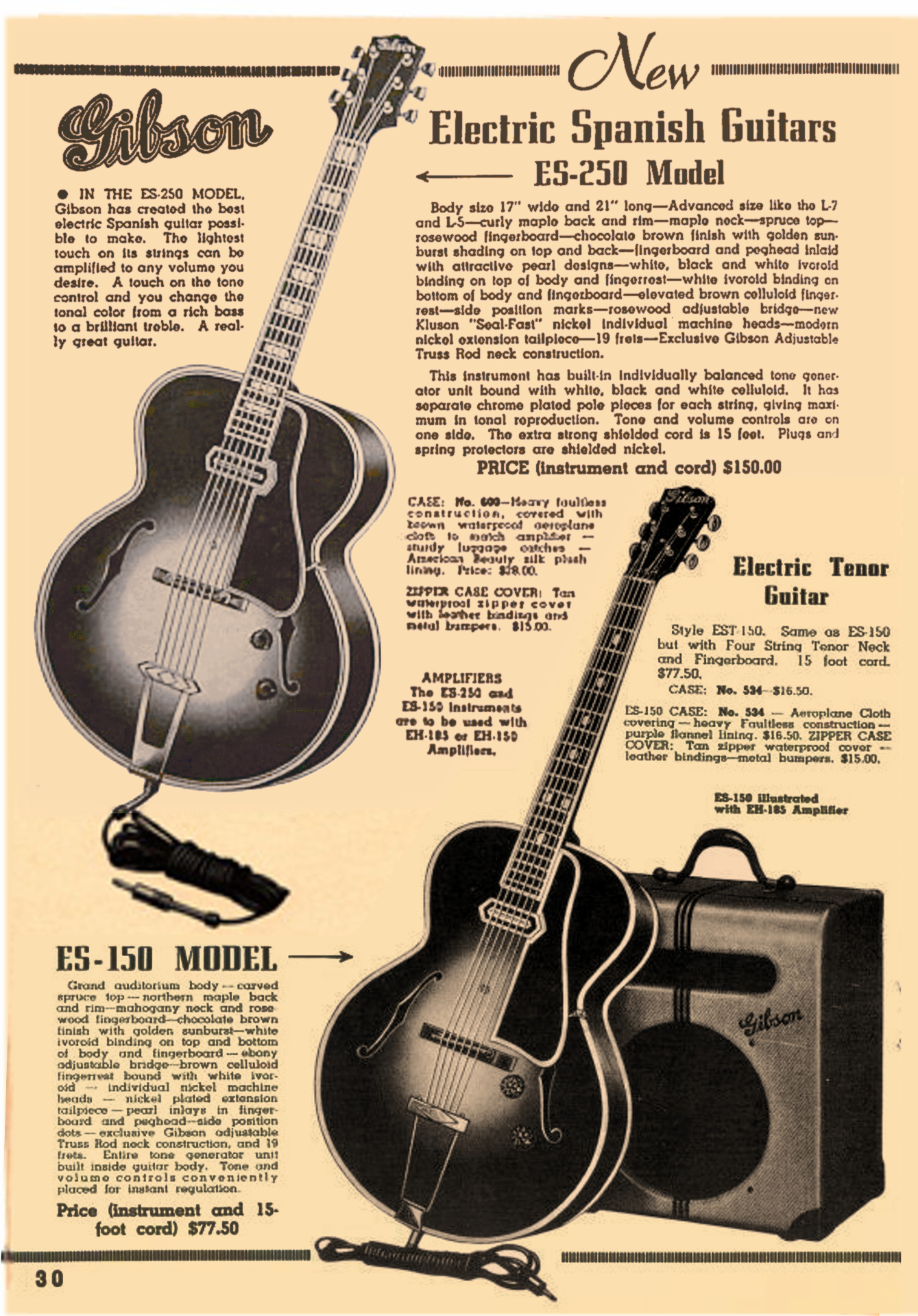
Magazine advertising, c. 1939

These electrified guitars were so successful that in the summer of 1936 two US retailers, Montgomery Ward and Spiegel, suggested that Gibson build what became the ES model. Montgomery Ward was the first to offer them for sale, as the 1270 model. It had Gibson's bar pickup (though with rounded bobbins, as opposed to the hexagonal pickup Gibson later installed on its own factory models), and a volume control (no tone control); like Spiegel's 34-S model (first advertised in 1937) it lacked any Gibson identification. Spiegel received 42 of these instruments between January and August 1937 before it cut them from the catalog. The contract with Montgomery Ward ran until 1940, and Gibson made an estimated 900 instruments with the 1270 designation.

Gibson's "own" ES-150, a "more-upmarket ES model" compared to the Ward and Spiegel models, had minor changes from the contract models, such as a solid carved spruce top, maple back and sides, and an adjustable truss rod. They shipped the first guitar to Bailey's House of Music on November 20, 1936. The instrument sold for $155 including cord, six-tube amplifier, and case. The pickup placement, closer to the instrument's neck than on Gibson's EH steel guitars and on guitars made by other manufacturers, produced a warmer, less "trebly" tone that was favorably received by jazz and blues players. In 1937, the model's peak year, Gibson shipped an average of forty guitars a month. In early 1937, Gibson began shipping two four-string versions: a tenor guitar (the EST-150, with a 23" scale, renamed the ETG-150 in 1940) and a plectrum version (the EPG-150, with a 27" scale). Early players included Eddie Durham, Floyd Smith and, the most famous of them, Charlie Christian, who bought an ES-150 in 1936. His joining the Benny Goodman Sextet in August 1939 gave the ES-150 "a near-mythical status" (aided by a feature in that year's December issue of Down Beat).

Gibson introduced two new variations in August 1938: the cheaper ES-100 (with a smaller body and different pickup), and an upscale version, the ES-250 (with a different peghead, fancier inlays, and a pickup with individual pole pieces instead of a bar). Each with case and amplifier, the ES-100 sold for $117.50 (equivalent to $2,600 in 2024) and the ES-250 started at $253 (equivalent to $5,700 in 2024).

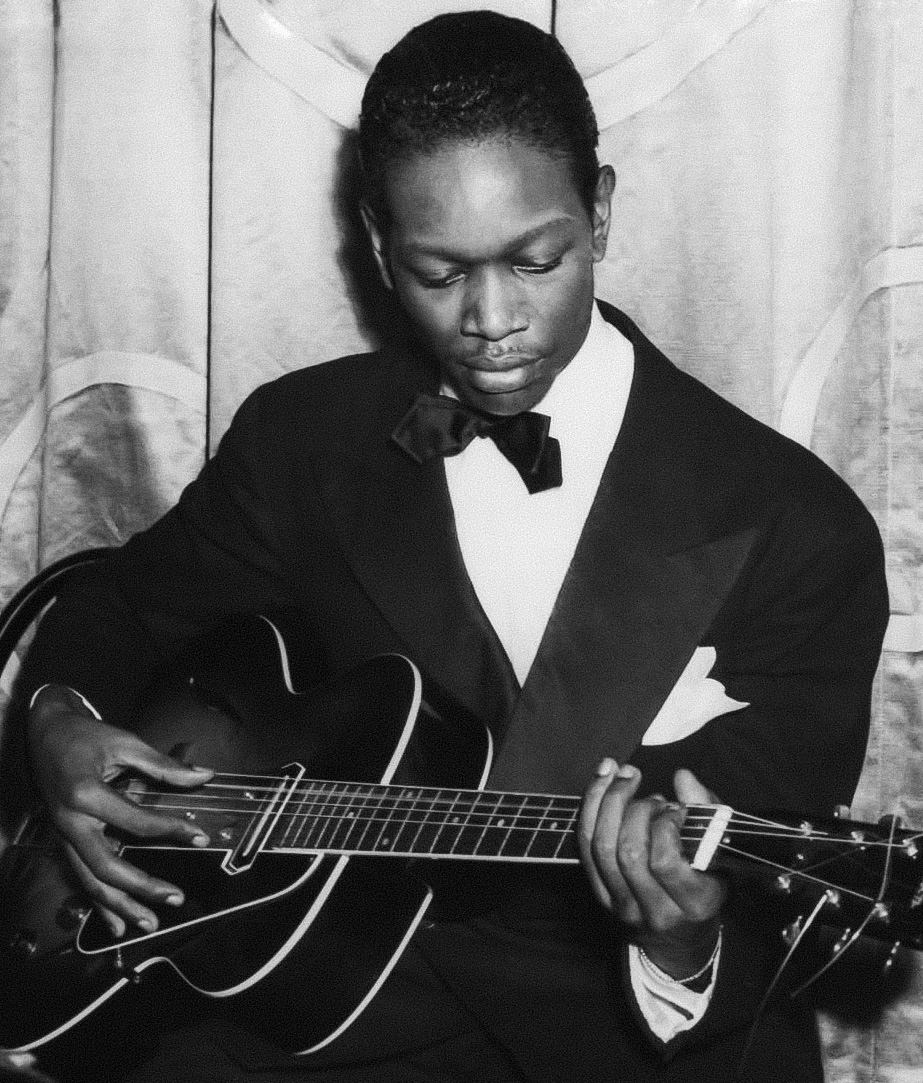
Charlie Christian playing a Gibson ES-150 guitar at the Waldorf Astoria New York, October 1939

By 1940, sales had slumped, and Gibson enhanced the model, changing to pickups with Alnico magnets—the forerunner of the P-90, which is still in production. They installed the new pickups on all their electric models, starting in July 1940, renaming the ES-100 and 250 to ES-125 and 300). On the ES-150, Gibson moved the pickup (with adjustable individual poles) closer to the bridge for a more "biting" sound for soloing. Gibson still installed bar-style pickups on request on post-1940 models for Hank Garland, Barry Galbraith, and Barney Kessel. Gibson formally reintroduced the bar pickup in 1958 as a $60 option (equivalent to $700 in 2024) — announcing it with the question, "Remember the straight-bar pickup that was made famous by Charlie Christian?"

== Later models ==
In the late 1960s, Gibson introduced the ES-150DC, which was a significantly different instrument, despite its similar model number. The ES-150DC was a hollowbody electric guitar with a double-cutaway body similar in appearance to the semi-hollow 335 guitars (except for a greater body thickness). It featured two humbuckers, a rosewood fingerboard with small block inlays, and a master volume knob on the lower cutaway. This model, however, was not particularly popular, and it was discontinued by Gibson in the mid-1970s.

== Production numbers ==
Shipping numbers for the ES-150 in its first full year, 1937, were relatively strong at 464. Thirty-seven EST-150s and one single EPG-150 were shipped in 1937. Of the ES-250, 14 were shipped in 1939. By that year, sales of the ES-150 had dwindled to about 20 units on average per month.

Model	Year	Number built
ES-150	1936	23
ES-150	1937	464
ES-150	1938	362
ES-150	1939	252
ES-150	1940	218
ES-150	Total	1,319
EST-150	1937	37
EST-150	1938	22
EST-150	1939	15
EST-150	1940	19
EST-150	Total	93
EPG-150	1937	1

== "Charlie Christian pickup" ==
The Charlie Christian pickup, as the bar-style pickup of the early ES-150 models came to be known, was a departure from previous pickups. Earlier pickups featured either a horseshoe magnet that arched over the strings (as found on the Rickenbacker A-22 "Frying Pan"), or a static coil through which a magnet passed, the magnet being vibrated by the guitar's bridge (a design used by former Gibson employee Lloyd Loar on his Vivi-Tone guitar). The Charlie Christian pickup consists of a coil of copper wire wound around a black plastic bobbin. The coil has a rectangular hole in its center, and the coil and bobbin fit around a chrome-plated steel blade polepiece. Attached at right angles to the bottom of the polepiece are a pair of five-inch-long (13 cm) steel bar magnets, which remain out of sight inside the instrument. These magnets are secured to the top of the ES-150 by the three bolts visible on the guitar's top.

Gibson made three varieties of the Charlie Christian pickup, all distinguished by the polepiece:

1. The first, produced from 1936 until mid-1938, had a plain blade polepiece. The coil was wound to about 2.4 kΩ resistance using AWG 38 enameled wire.
2. The second type, introduced on ES-150s from mid-1938 onward, had a polepiece with a notch cut out below the second (B) string. This modification lowered the B string's volume, which previously sounded louder than the other strings. This pickup's coil was wound with more turns of a finer wire (AWG 42), producing approximately 5.2 kΩ resistance and higher output.
3. The third pickup was available on the Gibson ES-250, beginning in 1939. The blade on this pickup had five notches, one in each string space. This pickup had a more compact internal design, with a cobalt steel slug that was small enough to sit directly under the pickup.

=== Sound ===
Charlie Christian pickups produce a clear sound because of their narrow string-sensing blade, and a strong signal because of their relatively high coil impedance. Uneven magnetic flux within the steel magnets can cause some distortion in the signal. These pickups are relatively sensitive to electromagnetic hum because of their large surface area and lack of shielding.

In a c. 1990s article discussing the sound and history of the Charlie Christian pickup, vintage guitar dealer Phil Emerson wrote:

"Have you noticed how profound the influence that the old Gibson Charlie Christian bar magnet pickup has had on tone? It is a pickup that is instantly identifiable when heard. Everybody (including me) just goes crazy for that light, but dark, warm but steely, hot but mellow tone. Warm — but clean, punchy — but transparent, it's all the above and more. Isn't it curious that the greatest sounding jazz guitar pickup was developed at the very beginning of electric guitar evolution, and was in existence before 99% of the rest of electric guitars and pickups were even developed!"

Largely due to the influence of Charlie Christian himself, numerous 20th century guitarists performed and recorded using instruments equipped with versions of the Charlie Christian pickup. These include the following: T-Bone Walker, Tiny Grimes, Oscar Moore, Barney Kessel, Alvino Rey, Jimmy Raney, Rene’ Thomas, Jimmy Gourley, Tal Farlow, Tony Mottola, Mary Osborne, Barry Galbraith, Elek Bacsik, Dennis Budimir, Dave Barbour, Eddie Duran, Hank Garland, Kenny Burrell, Louis Stewart.
