= Ken Kersey =

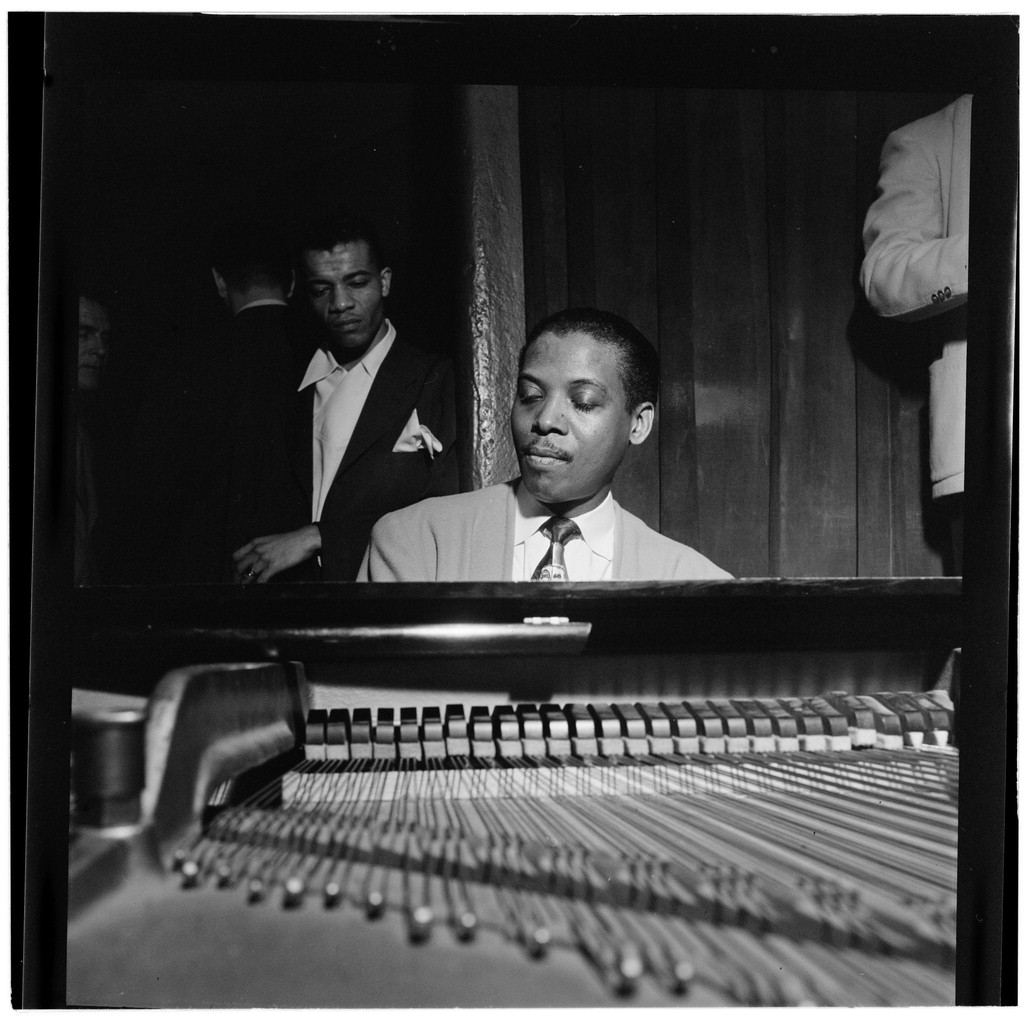
- At Café Society, New York City, c. June 1947, photograph by William P. Gottlieb

Background information
- Born: Kenneth Lyons Kersey; April 3, 1916; Harrow, Ontario, Canada
- Died: April 1, 1983 (aged 66)
- Genres: Jazz
- Occupation: Musician
- Instrument: Piano
- Years active: Mid-1930s–late 1950s

Kenneth Lyons Kersey (April 3, 1916 – April 1, 1983) was a Canadian jazz pianist who spent most of his life working in the United States.

== Early life ==
Kersey was born in Harrow, Ontario, on April 3, 1916 into a musical family. He studied piano and trumpet while attending the Detroit Institute of Musical Arts.

== Later life and career ==
In 1936, Kersey moved to New York City, where he played with Lucky Millinder, Billy Hicks, Frankie Newton, Billie Holiday, Roy Eldridge, Red Allen, and Cootie Williams. In late 1941 and early 1942, he participated in jam sessions at Minton's Playhouse, appearing on a seminal recording from one of those sessions with Charlie Christian.

In 1942, he replaced Mary Lou Williams as Andy Kirk's pianist; Kirk recorded his composition "Boogie Woogie Cocktail". He was in the Army from 1943 to 1945, where he sometimes played trumpet in military bands, then played from 1946 to 1949 with the Jazz at the Philharmonic touring ensembles. He continued to perform with such musicians as Eldridge and Allen, as well as Buck Clayton, Edmond Hall, Sol Yaged, and Charlie Shavers.

Kersey retired from music in the late 1950s, because of medical problems that have described as a "bone ailment" or "a stroke and related cardiovascular problems". He recorded twelve tunes as a bandleader: four for Savoy Records in 1946, two for Clef Records in 1949, two for Circle Records in 1950, and four for Foxy Records in 1951 which featured Hot Lips Page and Paul Quinichette as sidemen. Kersey died in New York City on April 1, 1983.

== Discography ==
=== As leader ===
- Piano Styles of Ken Kersey (Savoy, 1946; EP)

=== As sideman ===
With Buck Clayton

- All the Cats Join In (Columbia, 1956)

With Edmond Hall

- Jazz at the Savoy Cafe, Boston (Savoy, 1949)

With Jimmy Hamilton

- Clarinet in Hi Fi (1955)

With Jonah Jones

- Jonah Jones Sextet (Bethlehem, 1954)

With Charlie Shavers

- Horn o' Plenty (Bethlehem, 1955)
