= Toots Mondello =

American jazz saxophonist (1911–1992)

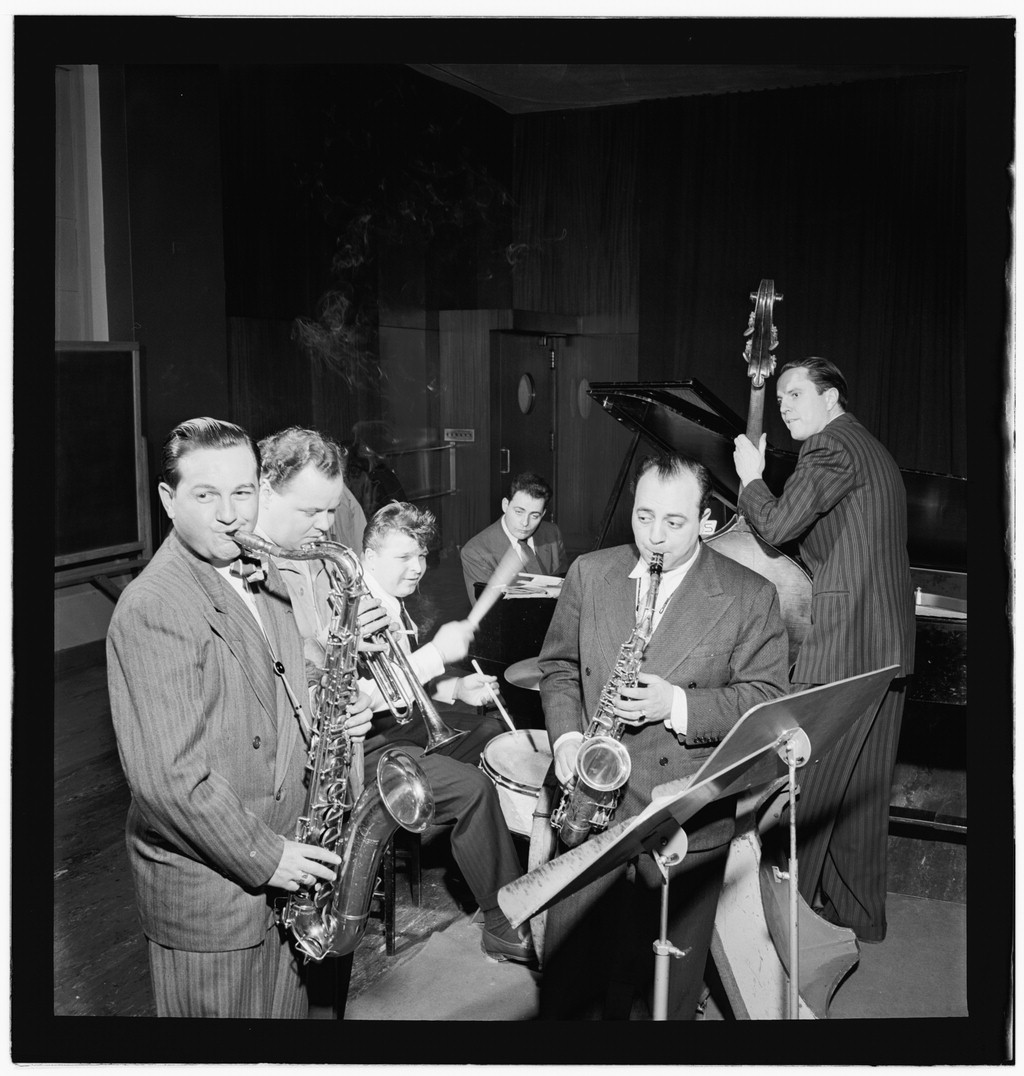
Art Drelinger, Billy Butterfield, Bunny Shawker, Stan Freeman, Toots Mondello, and Bob Haggart, Columbia studio, New York, ca. Mar. 1947 (William P. Gottlieb 03651)

Nunzio (Toots) Mondello (August 14, 1911 – November 15, 1992) was an American swing jazz alto saxophonist.

Born in Boston, Massachusetts, Mondello played with Mal Hallett from 1927 to 1933, where he also simultaneously performed saxophone and trombone, and with Irving Aaronson's Commanders, Joe Haymes, and Buddy Rogers. In 1934–35, Mondello was a member of the Benny Goodman Orchestra; he returned to play with Goodman in 1939–40. In the interim, Mondello worked with Haymes, Ray Noble, and Phil Harris.

Mondello did extensive work as a studio sideman, with Chick Bullock, Bunny Berigan, Miff Mole, Claude Thornhill, Larry Clinton, Teddy Wilson, Louis Armstrong (1938–39), Lionel Hampton, and the Metronome All–Stars. Mondello recorded as a leader between 1937 and 1939, doing two sessions with a big band, one with a nonet, and one with a trio.

Mondello served in the military during World War II. He continued doing session work and remained active into the 1970s. He and Goodman reunited to record in 1967.

He was also a flutist. For many years he studied with Harold Bennett, and compiled a book of Bennett's finger exercises. Mondello studied composition with Paul Creston for thirteen years, and the two remained lifelong friends.

Mondello died in New York City, New York, aged 81.
