= Carmen Mastren =

American jazz musician (1913–1981)

- Birth name: Carmine Nicholas Mastrandrea
- Born: October 6, 1913; Cohoes, New York, U.S.
- Died: March 31, 1981 (aged 67); Long Island, New York
- Genres: Jazz
- Occupations: Musician; arranger
- Instruments: Guitar; banjo; violin
- Years active: 1930s–1970s
- Labels: Mercury
- Formerly of: Tommy Dorsey

Carmen Mastren (born Carmine Nicholas Mastrandrea, October 6, 1913 – March 31, 1981) was an American jazz guitarist, banjoist, and violinist who was a member of the Tommy Dorsey orchestra from 1936 to 1941.

== Career ==
Mastren became a professional musician in 1934 when he joined the Wingy Manone and Joe Marsala band. During the 1940s, he spent four years as a guitarist and arranger for Tommy Dorsey. After his time with Marsala, he was a studio musician, recorded with Sidney Bechet, then entered the U.S Army. He was a member of the Glenn Miller Air Force big band. From the early 1950s to 1970, he worked as a studio musician for NBC. He recorded one solo album, on which he played banjo instead of guitar.

During the 1940s Mastren worked as musical director and conductor for Morton Downey, and from 1954 to 1970 Mastren played for The Today Show, The Tonight Show and Say When!! on NBC. Mastren died at age 68 from a heart attack on March 31, 1981, at his home in Valley Stream on Long Island, New York.

== Discography ==
=== As leader ===
- Banjorama (Mercury, 1958)

=== As sideman ===
- Al Caiola, Italian Guitars (Time, 1960)
- The Four Lads, Dixieland Doin's (Kapp, 1961)
- Bud Freeman, Midnight at Eddie Condon's (Emarcy, 1955)
- Wingy Manone, Trumpet On the Wing (Decca, 1958)
- Tony Mottola, String Band Strum-Along (Command, 1961)
