= Dave Tough =

American jazz drummer (1907–1948)

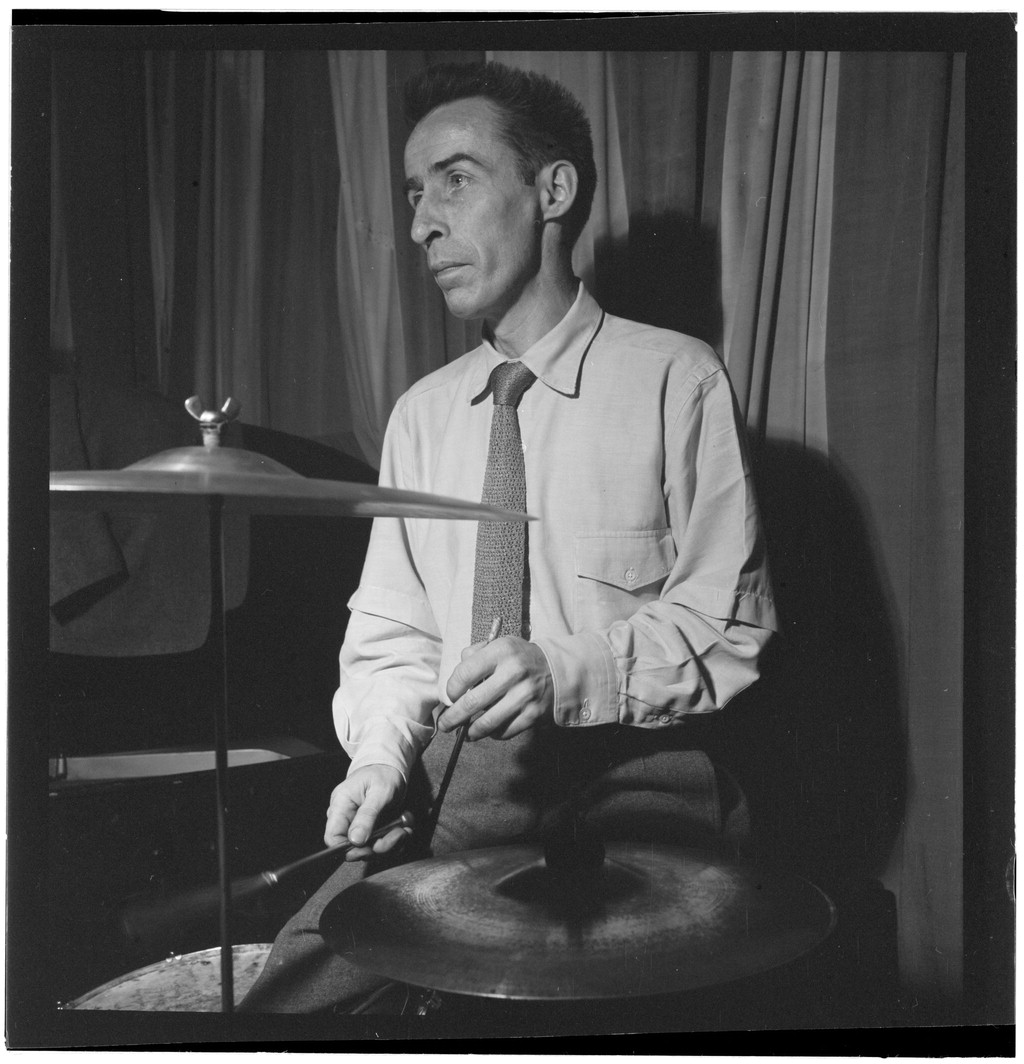
- Tough in Eddie Condon's basement, c. 1947; Photography by William P. Gottlieb

Background information
- Born: David Jarvis Tough; April 26, 1907; Oak Park, Illinois, U.S.
- Died: December 9, 1948 (aged 41) Newark, New Jersey, U.S.
- Genres: Jazz
- Occupation: Musician
- Instrument: Drums
- Years active: 1925–1948

David Jarvis Tough (April 26, 1907 – December 9, 1948) was an American jazz drummer associated with Dixieland and swing jazz in the 1930s and 1940s. He has been described as "the most important of the drummers of the Chicago circle".

== Biography ==
Born in Oak Park, Illinois, United States, Tough was a friend of Bud Freeman, who was part of a group of musicians known as the Austin High School Gang in Chicago. In 1925, he became a professional musician, playing with Jack Gardner, Art Kassel, Sig Meyers, and Husk O'Hare's Wolverines. He played two years in Europe, then returned home and played with Benny Goodman and Red Nichols.

He left music for three years until 1935, then joined the big bands of Tommy Dorsey, Red Norvo, Bunny Berigan, and Benny Goodman. He played Dixieland jazz with Bud Freeman, Jack Teagarden, Eddie Condon, Mezz Mezzrow, and Joe Marsala. In the 1940s, he played with the big bands of Charlie Spivak and Claude Thornhill, in Artie Shaw's Symphonic Swing Orchestra (1941), Shaw's naval band (1942-1944) and Woody Herman's big band (1945). He then worked with Eddie Condon, Jerry Gray, Muggsy Spanier, Will Bradley and Jazz at the Philharmonic.

Tough struggled with epilepsy throughout his life. He died at the age of 41 after falling down and hitting his head on the street in Newark, New Jersey.

...(Woody) Herman told (Ed) Soph that Dave Tough was an epileptic. This condition wasn't fully understood in the twenties and thirties. In many instances it was considered a mental deficency. As a recommended aid in reducing the epileptic attacks, Tough drank... ...One cold icy evening in the winter of 1948, Dave Tough was out walking on leave from a stay at a Veterans Hospital. He had an epileptic attack, fell hitting his head on the sidewalk and was dead.

He was played by Shelly Manne in the 1959 Paramount Pictures biopic The Five Pennies, a biography of Red Nichols starring Danny Kaye, Barbara Bel Geddes, and Louis Armstrong.

In 2000, he was inducted into the Big Band and Jazz Hall of Fame.

== Discography ==
With Tommy Dorsey

- Tribute to Dorsey Vol. 1 (RCA 1956)
- Tribute to Dorsey Vol. 2 (RCA Victor, 1957)
- Yes Indeed! (RCA Victor, 1956)

With Benny Goodman

- Trio Quartet Quintet (RCA Victor, 1956)
- This Is Benny Goodman and His Orchestra (RCA Victor, 1956)
- Charlie Christian (Philips, 1959)
- Performance 1937-1938 Volume 2 (MGM, 1959)
- Swing, Swing, Swing (RCA Camden, 1960)
- Portrait in Swing (Verve, 1964)
- This Is Benny Goodman (RCA Victor, 1971)
- Goodman On the Air (Nostalgia, 1979)
- The Complete RCA Victor Small Group Recordings (RCA Victor, 1997)

With Charlie Ventura

- Jumping with Ventura (EmArcy, 1955)
- Carnegie Hall Concert (Columbia, 1956)
- East of Suez (Regent, 1958)
- Live at the Three Deuces! with Bill Harris (Phoenix Jazz, 1975)
- Aces at the Deuces with Bill Harris (Phoenix Jazz, 1976)
- Euphoria (Savoy, 1980)
- Live at the Three Deuces Vol. 2 with Bill Harris (HighNote, 2000)

With others

- Mildred Bailey, Her Greatest Performances 1929–1946 (Columbia, 1962)
- Bunny Berigan, Bunny Berigan Volume 2 (Shoestring, 1975)
- George Brunies & Wild Bill Davison, Tin Roof Blues (Commodore, 1980)
- Charlie Christian, Solo Flight (Columbia, 1972)
- Eddie Condon, A Legend (Mainstream, 1965)
- Bud Freeman, Midnight at Eddie Condon's (Emarcy, 1955)
- Woody Herman, The Thundering Herds (Columbia, 1961)
- Woody Herman, The Turning Point 1943–1944 (Coral, 1969)
- Joe Marsala, Joe Marsala and His Orchestra featuring Adele Girard (Aircheck, 1976)
- Joe Marsala, Lower Register (IAJRC, 1981)
- Flip Phillips, A Melody from the Sky (Bob Thiele Music, 1975)
- Alvino Rey, Uncollected 1946 (Hindsight, 1978)
- Artie Shaw, Born to Swing (Durium, 1976)
- Artie Shaw, Evensong (Hep, 2000)
- Rex Stewart, Rex Stewart and the Ellingtonians (Riverside, 1960)
- Jack Teagarden, Jack Teagarden (RCA Victor, 1966)
- Jack Teagarden, King of the Blues Trombone (Epic/Columbia, 1963)
- Claude Thornhill, Buster's Last Stand (Hep, 2001)
- Ben Webster, Ben and the Boys (Jazz Archives, 1976)
