= Artie Bernstein =

American jazz double bassist

- Birth name: Arthur Bernstein
- Born: February 4, 1909; Brooklyn, New York, U.S.
- Died: January 4, 1964 (aged 54); Los Angeles, California
- Genres: Jazz
- Occupation: Musician
- Instrument(s): Double bass, cello
- Years active: 1929–1963
- Labels: Bluebird, Decca, Definitive, Victor
- Formerly of: Tommy Dorsey, Ben Pollack, Kay Thompson, Benny Goodman

Arthur Bernstein (February 4, 1909 – January 4, 1964) was an American jazz double bassist.

Born in Brooklyn, New York, he started his musical career playing cello on board cruise ships to South America, and also studied law at New York University. However, by 1929 he had started playing bass, and began performing in clubs around New York City. He performed with trumpeter Red Nichols, Red Norvo, Kay Thompson, Lou Bring, Ziggy Elman, The Boswell Sisters, and others, and recorded with Ben Pollack, Jimmy and Tommy Dorsey, and many others in the 1930s. In 1939 he performed with Benny Goodman at the second From Spirituals to Swing concert.

He fell out with Goodman in 1941 - Goodman fiddled with Bernstein's music-stand light so that he would have problems reading the music and appear incompetent, giving Goodman a pretext to fire him. After leaving Goodman in the summer of 1941, Bernstein planned on heading to Los Angeles for work from New York. Before heading out though, he learned that Teddy Wilson's bassist Israel Crosby was forced to leave the band for Chicago and be inducted into the army. So Bernstein halted his own plans in order to fill in for Wilson for a week until he could hire a new bassist, Bernstein even giving his week's salary to Crosby. A noble gesture rarely seen in the industry at the time.

Despite his fallout with Goodman, he won the Down Beat readers' poll in 1943. He later moved to Los Angeles and worked in the film industry for such companies as Universal Studios and Warner Bros., continuing to work for the latter organization until 1963.

He died in Los Angeles at the age of 54.
