= Eddie Miller (jazz saxophonist) =

American jazz musician (1911–1991)

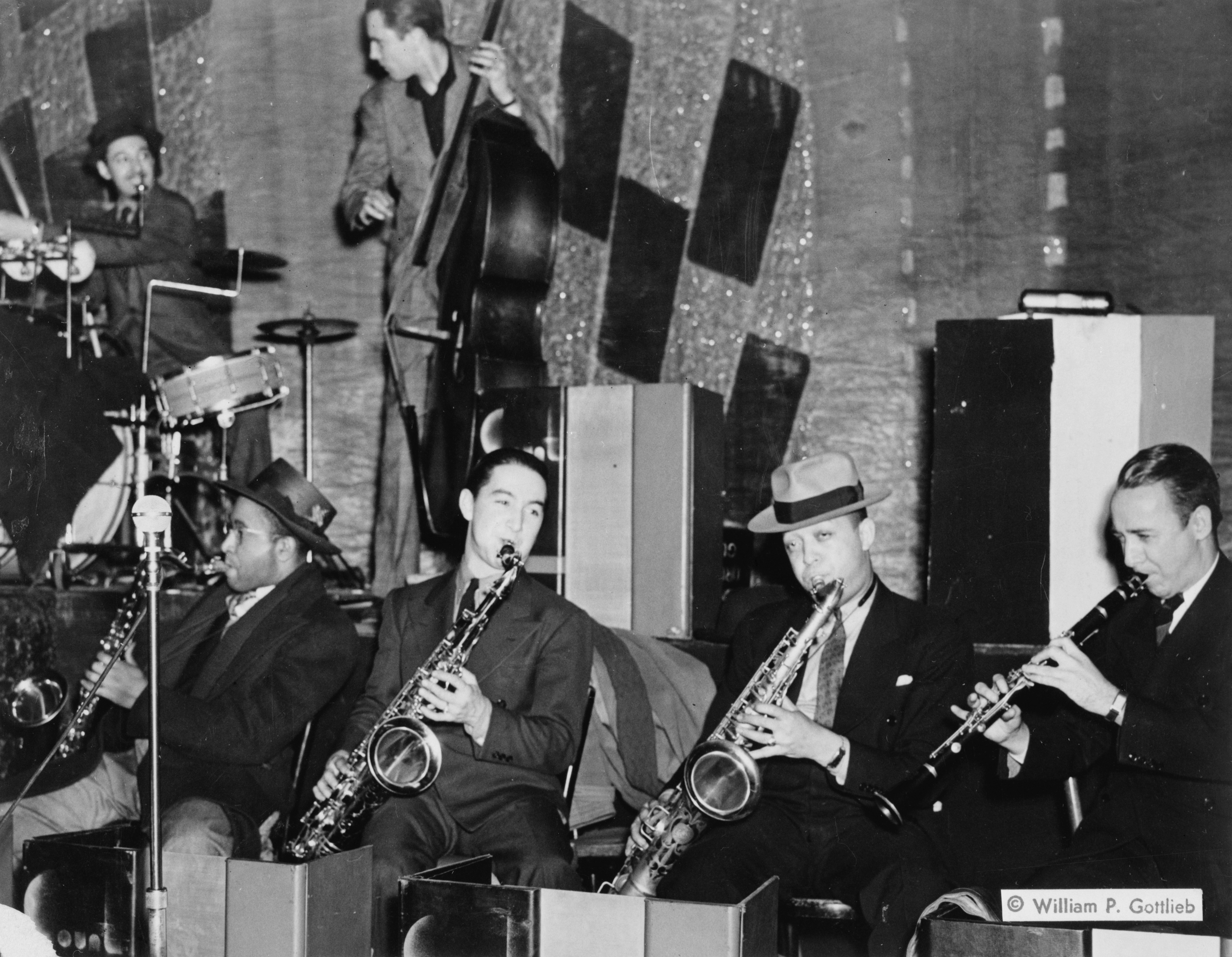
- Muller (fourth from left) performing, c. 1939. From left to right, Ray Bauduc, Herschel Evans, Bob Haggart Miller, Lester Young, Matty Matlock, and Howard Theatre

Background information
- Born: Edward Raymond Müller; June 23, 1911; New Orleans, Louisiana, US
- Died: April 1, 1991 (aged 79) Van Nuys, Los Angeles, California, US
- Genre: Jazz
- Instruments: Tenor saxophone, clarinet

Edward Raymond Müller (June 23, 1911 – April 1, 1991) known professionally as Eddie Miller, was an American jazz musician who played tenor saxophone and clarinet.

== Early life ==
Miller was born on June 23, 1911, in New Orleans. In his early teens, he got a job selling newspapers, so he would be eligible for a newsboys' band.

== Career ==
Miller professional career began in New Orleans at 16, with his recording debut occurring in 1930 with Julie Wintz. He worked in Ben Pollack's orchestra and then stayed when Bob Crosby took over its leadership. He stayed with Crosby until the band broke up in 1942. He played on Glenn Miller's first release under his own name in 1935 on the Columbia Records 78 single release "Solo Hop". He had his own band for a brief time after that, before being drafted. However, he was discharged from the military early because of illness and settled in Los Angeles. After that he worked with Pete Fountain, appeared in most of Crosby's reunions, and did club work. He also played with trumpeter Al Hirt.

Miller was also a songwriter, with his best-known song being "Slow Mood," later known as "Lazy Mood" after Johnny Mercer noticed the tune and composed lyrics. Miller was inducted into the Big Band and Jazz Hall of Fame in 1998.

Miller won numerous Playboy and Esquire Jazz polls. Miller finished his career with Pete Fountain, living in New Orleans. While with the Pete Fountain organization, he was featured as the lead saxophonist at the 1971 and 1972 Greenwood Arts Festivals (Greenwood, Mississippi). Digitized recordings are available through the Delta Jazz Collection.

== Personal life ==
Miller died on April 1, 1991, aged 79, in Van Nuys, from pneumonia.

== Discography ==
=== As leader ===
- Frat Hop (Tops, 1957)
- Armand Hug and His New Orleans Dixielanders/Eddie Miller and His New Orleans Rhythm Pals (Southland, 1958)
- Tenor of Jazz (Fontana, 1967)
- With a Little Help from My Friend with Pete Fountain (Coral, 1968)
- A Portrait of Eddie (Blue Angel, 1970)
- Just Friends with Armand Hug (Land O' Jazz, 1976)
- Wild Bill Davison and Eddie Miller Play Hoagy Carmichael (Realtime, 1981)
- Street of Dreams with Johnny Varro (Magna Graphic Jazz, 1982)
- The Eddie Miller Quartet Plays Mostly Ellington (Audiophile, 2003)

=== As sideman ===
- Glenn Miller, "Solo Hop", 78 single, (Columbia Records, 1935)
- Si Zentner, In Person (International Award, 1962)
- Ray Conniff, Rhapsody In Rhythm (Columbia Records, 1962)
- Beverly Mahr, Gordon Jenkins Presents My Wife The Blues Singer (Impulse, 1963)
- Jack Lesberg, Hollywood Swing (Famous Door, 1978)
- Ray Linn, Empty Suit Blues (Discovery, 1981)
- Heinie Beau, Blues for Two (Henri, 1983)
