= Ziggy Elman =

American jazz trumpeter

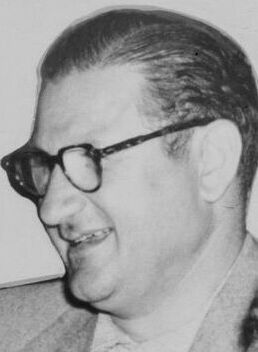
- Elman in 1952

Background information
- Born: Harry Aaron Finkelman; May 26, 1914; Philadelphia, Pennsylvania, U.S.
- Died: June 26, 1968 (aged 54) Los Angeles, California, U.S.
- Genres: Jazz, swing
- Occupation: Musician
- Instrument: Trumpet
- Years active: 1930s–1950s
- Formerly of: Ziggy Elman and His Orchestra

Harry Aaron Finkelman (May 26, 1914 – June 26, 1968), known professionally as Ziggy Elman, was an American jazz trumpeter associated with Benny Goodman, though he also led his own group, Ziggy Elman and His Orchestra.

== Early years ==
Elman was born in Philadelphia, Pennsylvania, United States, but his family settled in Atlantic City, New Jersey when he was four. His father was a violinist who had hoped Elman would play violin. Although he did learn to play violin, he preferred brass instruments. He began playing for Jewish weddings and nightclubs at age 15.

== Career ==
In 1932, made his first recording, playing the trombone. At some point in the decade he adopted the name "Ziggy Elman".

In 1936, Elman joined the Benny Goodman orchestra as a trumpeter, after playing briefly with a band led by Alex Bartha at Steel Pier in Atlantic City, where Goodman heard him.

In 1938, while with Goodman, he got a contract with Bluebird, RCA's cheaper label, to record 20 sides as Ziggy Elman and his Orchestra, although all the members were in Goodman's band. One original tune was "Frailach in Swing," based on a 1918 recording of "Der Shtiller Bulgar" ("The Quiet Bulgar") by Abe Schwartz. During the first half of 1939, Benny Goodman and His Orchestra was featured on the "Camel Caravan" radio show, with singer and songwriter Johnny Mercer as singer, writer of speciality numbers, and announcer. One weekly show, Goodman challenged Mercer, who was known for usually being a fast writer, to write lyrics for Elman's tune in one week. Two weeks later, Mercer brought some lyrics for a slower tempo. Goodman had arranger Jimmy Mundy write an arrangement for the tune, now called "And the Angels Sing". The recording, with vocal by Martha Tilton and featuring Elman's trumpet, was a No. 1 hit. Mercer biographer Philip Furia suggests the challenge to Mercer "sounds like a prearranged plug for a completed song."

After leaving Goodman in 1940, Elman joined Tommy Dorsey and stayed until he was drafted in 1943. After he was discharged in 1946, he re-joined Dorsey for another year.

He loved frailach music (Jewish wedding music) later known as klezmer, and made a few recordings of such with Mickey Katz. In the period from 1940 to 1947, he was honored in Down Beat magazine's Readers Poll six times. He led his own bands from 1947.

In 1956, he was asked to recreate a klezmer solo with the vocalist Martha Tilton for the movie, The Benny Goodman Story, but was unable to, his technique having since withered away. Elman appeared performing it in the film, but another trumpeter, Mannie Klein, played the solo on the soundtrack.

By the 1950s, the music had changed. Big bands had declined and for a time he switched to entertainment work. In this decade he appeared in films mostly as himself. In 1956 he had a heart attack, curtailing his music career. By the end of the 1950s he was financially ruined, and had to work for a car dealership. In 1961, it was revealed at an alimony hearing that he was virtually bankrupt. He later worked in a music store and gave trumpet lessons. He died of liver failure in 1968 at the age of 54 and was buried at Mount Sinai Memorial Park Cemetery in Los Angeles.

== Discography ==
=== As leader ===
- "Fralich in Swing/Bublitchki" (Bluebird, 1939)
- "Bye 'n' Bye/Deep Night" (Bluebird, 1939)

=== As sideman ===
With Benny Goodman

- "Bei mir bis du schon" (Victor, 1937)
- "Wrapping It Up" (Victor, 1938)
- "And the Angels Sing" (Victor, 1939)
- "Zaggin' with Zig" (Bluebird, 1939)
- The Famous 1938 Carnegie Hall Jazz Concert Volume 1 (Columbia Masterworks, 1950)
- The Famous 1938 Carnegie Hall Jazz Concert Volume II (Columbia Masterworks, 1950)
- The Complete RCA Victor Small Group Recordings (RCA Victor, 1997)

With Tommy Dorsey

- "Swing High" (Victor, 1940)
- "Swanee River" (Victor, 1940)
- What Is This Thing Called Love? (Victor, 1942)
- Yes Indeed! (RCA Victor, 1956)

With others

- Lionel Hampton, "Ain't Cha Comin' Home?" (Victor, 1939)
- Lionel Hampton, "Gin for Christmas" (Victor, 1939)
- Jess Stacy, Tribute to Benny Goodman (Atlantic, 1956)
