= Jess Stacy =

American jazz pianist (1904–1995)

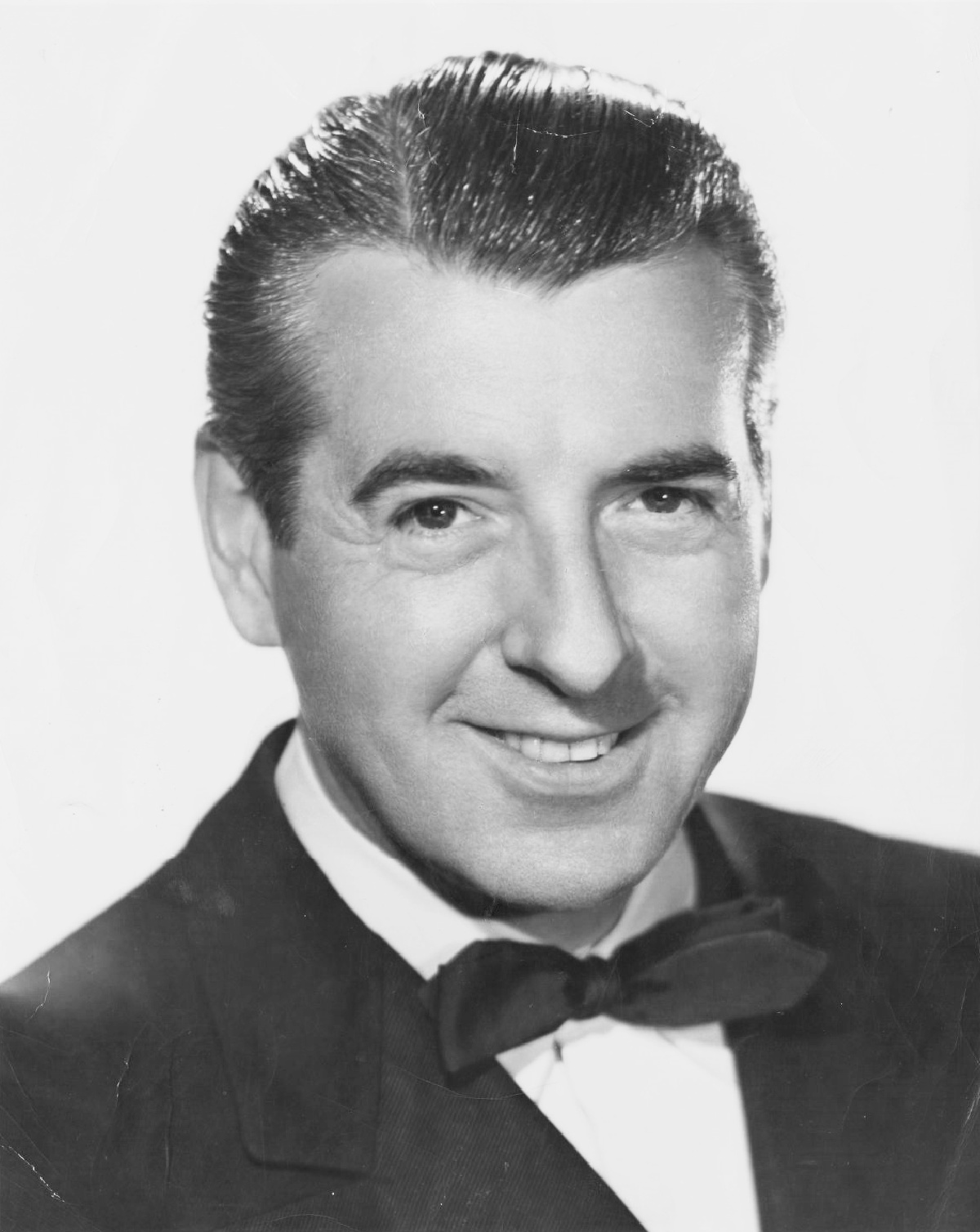
- Stacy, c. 1945

Background information
- Born: Jesse Alexander Stacy; August 11, 1904; Bird's Point, Missouri, U.S.
- Origin: Cape Girardeau, Missouri, U.S.
- Died: January 1, 1995 (aged 90) Los Angeles, California, U.S.
- Genres: Swing, jazz
- Occupation: Musician
- Instrument: Piano
- Spouses: Helen Robinson (m. 1924, divorced) Lee Wiley (m. 1943; div. 1948) Patricia Peck (m. 1950)

Jess Alexandria Stacy (born Jesse Alexander Stacy; August 11, 1904 – January 1, 1995) was an American jazz pianist who gained prominence during the swing era. He may be best remembered for his years with the Benny Goodman band during the late 1930s, particularly his performance at Goodman's 1938 concert at Carnegie Hall.

== Early life ==
Jess Stacy was born in Bird's Point, Missouri, a small town across the Mississippi River from Cairo, Illinois, to Frederick Lee Stacy, a railroad engineer, and Sara (Alexander) Stacy, a seamstress. His first piano teacher was Mabel Irene Bailey, who played piano for silent movies. In 1918, Stacy moved to Cape Girardeau, Missouri. He received his only formal music training with Clyde Brandt, a professor of piano and violin at Southeast Missouri State Teachers College (now Southeast Missouri State University) while sweeping at Clark's Music Store.

By 1920, Stacy was playing piano in Peg Meyer's jazz ensemble at Cape Girardeau High School, the Bluebird Confectionary, and the Sweet Shop. Schoolmates called them the Agony Four. By 1921, the band was known as Peg Meyer's Melody Kings and started touring the Mississippi River on the Majestic and other riverboats.

== Career ==
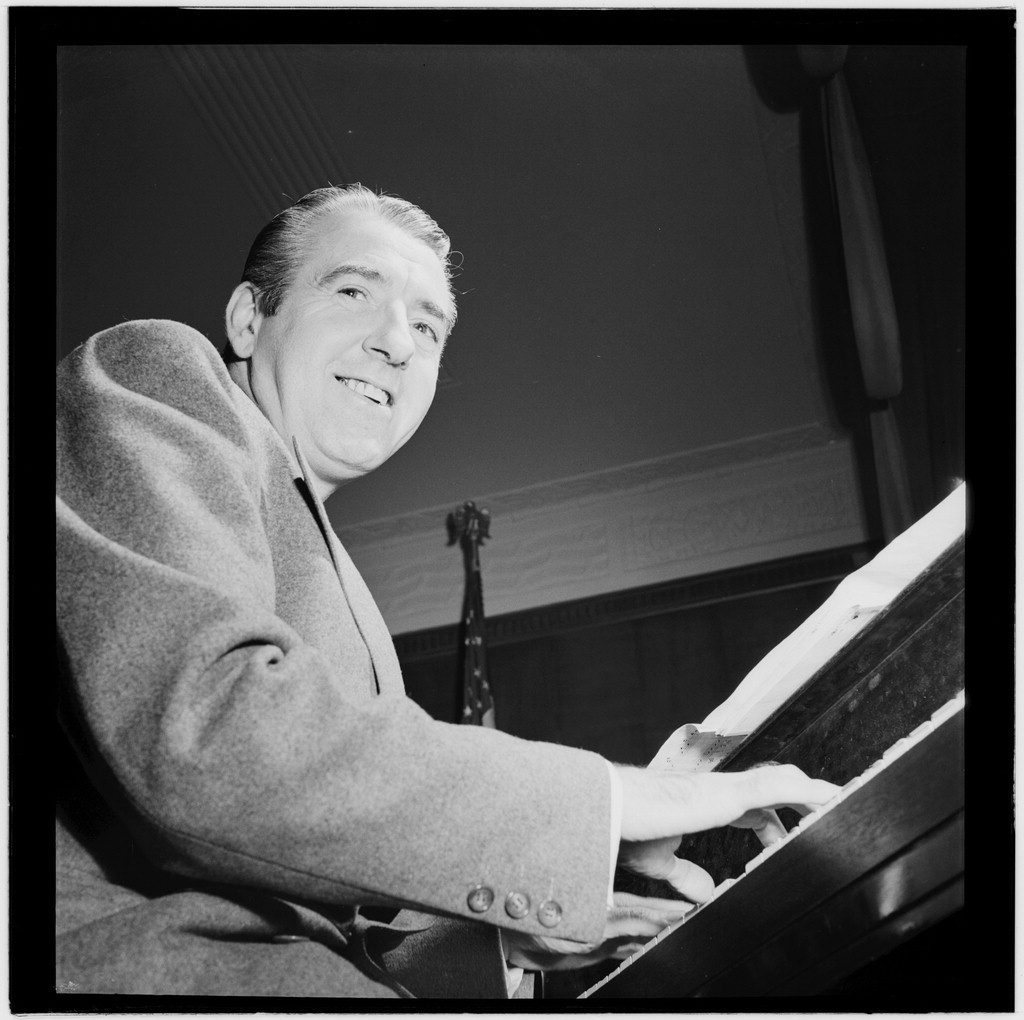
Stacy on the last night of the existence of the Benny Goodman Orchestra (New York, 1947)

In the early 1920s, Stacy moved to Chicago, where he performed with Paul Mares, leader of the New Orleans Rhythm Kings, playing a genre of jazz which came to be called "Chicago-style". Stacy cites his main influences as Louis Armstrong and especially pianist Earl Hines, who played piano for Armstrong and the Carroll Dickerson band.

In 1935, Benny Goodman asked him to join his band. Stacy left Floyd Towne, moved to New York City, and spent 1935–39 with the Benny Goodman Orchestra, including the Carnegie Hall concert in 1938. The Carnegie Hall performance was elevated in part by Stacy's unplanned piano solo during "Sing, Sing, Sing (With a Swing)", around which a great modern legacy has grown. Following a Goodman/Krupa duet, Stacy received a nod from Goodman to take a solo. "At the Carnegie Hall concert, after the usual theatrics, Jess Stacy was allowed to solo and, given the venue, what followed was appropriate ... Used to just playing rhythm on the tune, he was unprepared for a turn in the spotlight, but what came out of his fingers was a graceful, impressionistic marvel with classical flourishes, yet still managed to swing. It was the best thing he ever did, and it's ironic that such a layered, nuanced performance came at the end of such a chaotic, bombastic tune", wrote David Rickert. After leaving the Goodman Orchestra, Stacy joined the Bob Crosby Orchestra and the Bob Crosby Bob-Cats. He won the DownBeat magazine piano poll in 1940.

In 1950, Stacy moved to Los Angeles. His career declined to nightclub work. While playing at the piano bar in Leon's Steak House, he walked out after a drunken woman spilled beer in his lap. He announced he was quitting the music business and retired from public performances. He worked as a salesman, warehouseman, postman, and for Max Factor cosmetics before being rediscovered. He played for Nelson Riddle on the soundtrack of The Great Gatsby (1974). The same year as the film's release, he was invited to play at the Newport Jazz Festival, and was asked to record twice for Chiaroscuro Records, in 1974 and 1977 (Stacy Still Swings).

His final performance was broadcast on Marian McPartland's Piano Jazz on December 1, 1981. After his career's brief revival in the 1970s, he again retired from music and lived with his third wife, Patricia Peck Stacy. In addition to the Goodman and Crosby orchestras, Stacy played with Bix Beiderbecke, Eddie Condon, Bud Freeman, George Gershwin, Lionel Hampton, Billie Holiday, Gene Krupa, Jack Teagarden, and Horace Heidt.

== Personal life ==
Stacy had a tumultuous love life as a young man. His first wife was Helen Robinson; both were young when they married in 1924. Stacy worked at night in clubs and slept during the day while Robinson worked. She needed more security than Stacy was willing to provide, and Stacy was unwilling to work at a radio station for steady employment. This did not change when the couple had a son, Frederick Jess. They divorced and Robinson married a friend of Stacy, saxophonist Phil Wing.

His second wife was jazz singer Lee Wiley. The couple was described by their friend Deane Kincaide as "compatible as two cats, tails tied together, hanging over a clothesline." They divorced in 1948, after several years of marriage. His third wife was Patricia Peck. They dated for a decade before getting married on September 8, 1950. They lived in Los Angeles and were married for forty-five years. Stacy died of congestive heart failure in Los Angeles on January 1, 1995, aged 90.

== Awards and honors ==
Stacy was inducted into the Big Band and Jazz Hall of Fame in 1996.

== Discography ==
=== As leader ===
- Piano Moods (Columbia, 1950)
- Jess Stacy (Brunswick, 1956)
- Tribute to Benny Goodman (Atlantic, 1956)
- Stacy Still Swings (Chiaroscuro, 1974)
- Stacy's Still Swinging (Chiaroscuro, 1977)
- Blue Notion (Jazzology, 1983)
- Stacy and Sutton (Affinity, 1986)

=== As sideman ===
- Benny Goodman, The Complete RCA Victor Small Group Recordings, (RCA Victor, 1997)
