= Munn Ware =

American jazz trombonist

- The house band accompanying Sidney Bechet at his first residency at the Jazz, Ltd. club, November 1947; Left to right: Bill Reinhardt, Danny Alvin, Bechet, Mel Grant, Munn Ware

Background information
- Born: Winfred Nettleton Ware; February 12, 1909; Quincy, MA
- Died: August 9, 1970 (aged 61) Daytona Beach, FL
- Genres: Jazz
- Occupation: Musician
- Instrument: Trombone

Winfred Nettleton "Munn" Ware was an American jazz trombonist.

After having learned to play piano and banjo as a child, he took up the cornet while at Bowdoin College in Brunswick, Maine, first playing it professionally in Massachusetts before taking up the trombone around 1940. From 1942 to 1946 he played that instrument in an army band.

In 1946, Ware was in New York playing in bands led by Tony Parenti, Wild Bill Davison, and Danny Alvin.

From June 1947 he worked regularly at the Jazz Ltd. club in Chicago as a member of the house band led by club's co-owner, Bill Reinhardt. At around this time, Ware recorded with Sidney Bechet, Muggsy Spanier, and Doc Evans.
