= Harry Blons =

American jazz clarinetist

Harry Blons (né Harry Raymond Yblonski; 29 November 1911 Saint Paul, Minnesota — 20 July 1987 Minneapolis, Minnesota) was an American jazz clarinetist from Minnesota. He performed with the touring groups of Hal McIntyre, Red Nichols, and Red Dougherty. He had performed with jazz combos in Saint Paul and Minneapolis.

== Career ==
At the end of the 1940s, Blons began fronting his own group and playing in the Dixieland style. In 1954 he was featured on both clarinet and tenor sax in the Doc Evans combo, not abandoning the Harry Blons Six as the group remained active in the mid-1950s. Blons continued to be associated with his native St. Paul. While much of his group's recorded output is out of print, various live recordings done in Minnesota when stars such as Bunk Johnson and Don Ewell came through town remain in circulation. His recordings as a leader include the excellent Singin' the Blues, originally released by Mercury Records. Blons also created vinyl product for the Zephyr, Audio Fidelity, and Audiophile Records labels.

== Selected discography ==
- Traditional jazz. Vol. 7, Doc Evans

Doc Evans; Harry Blons; John W Parker; Hal Runyan; George Tupper; Bill Peer; Red Maddock
Audiophile Records (1956)

- Traditional jazz, vol. 6 by Doc Evans

Audiophile Records (196?)

- Dixie By Gaslight, Singleton Palmer

Singleton Palmer & Harry Blons' Dixieland Band
Norman Records (1964)

- Dixieland Jazz, Harry Blons

Audiophile Records (1951)

- Six on a Dixie Kick

Harry Blons; Dixie Six
Mercury Records (1957)

- Dixieland From the Deep North

Featuring Mendota Buzzards
Red Dougherty, Harry Blons, Warren Thewis, Larry Brakke, Bob Gruenenfelder, Gerald Mullaney, Thomas McGovern, Bernard Sundermeyer, Leigh Kammon, Mendota Buzzards
Zephyr (195?)

- Down in Jungle Town, Doc Evans

Doc Evans, Harry Blons, Loren Helberg, Tom McGovern, pianist, Hal Runyon, Hod Russell, Mickey Steinke, Bernie Sundermeyer, Warren Thewis, George Tupper, Erv Wickner, Doc Evans' Jazz Band
Jazzology Records (2000)

- Harry Blons

Harry Blons' Ensemble
Harry Blons, Willie Peterson, Eddie Tolck, Don Anderson, guitarist, Bernie Sundermeier, Warren Thewis
Audiophile Records (195?)

- Four or five times by Doc Evans

Jazzology Records (2002)

- Ray Bauduc-Nappy Lamare and their Dixieland

Ray Bauduc, Nappy Lamare, Harry Blons' Dixieland Band
Capitol Records (197?)

- Teddy Buckner at the Crescendo

Teddy Buckner, Harry Blons' Dixieland Band.
GNP Crescendo Record Co. (1976)

- Caution blues by Muggsy Spanier

Muggsy Spanier, Harry Blons' Dixieland Band
78 rpm
Mercury Records (1950?)

- Bunk Johnson & Don Ewell: The Complete Minneapolis, 1947

Bunk Johnson, Don Ewell, Harry Blons, Don Thompson, trombonist, Cliff Johnson, string bass player, Warren Thewis, Doc Evans' Jazz Band.
American Music Records (2009)

- Broadcast programmer No. 1

Johnny Puleo, Ed Jackson; Jo Basile; Lionel Hampton; Val Valenti; Leon Barry; Larry Adler; Dave Wierbach; Dukes of Dixieland.; Harmonica Gang.; Marimba Chiapas.; Harry Blons' Dixieland Band
Audiophile Records (196?)

- Bob Mitch Presents a Dixie Bouquet

Harry Blons' Dixieland Band.;
78 rpm
EDN Records, Milwaukee (1950)

- Easy Listening

Red Dougherty & Harry Blons;
Audiophile Records (195?)

- Breezin

Arthur Kay, Harry Blons, Claude Falenczyk, Grant Krueger, Joseph Szot, Gene Juckem
Audiophile Records (195?)

- Pee Wee Hunt and his Dixieland Band

Pee Wee Hunt and his Dixieland Band & Harry Blons' Dixieland Band.
Royale Records, [1956?]

- Sweet Georgia Brown

Muggsy Spanier, Harry Blons' Dixieland Band.
78 rpm
Mercury Records, [1950]

- Windy City Jazz, Max Kaminsky

Max Kaminsky, Pee Wee Russell, Miff Mole, Joe Sullivan, George Wettling, Jack Lesberg, Tavern in the Town, Harry Blons' Dixieland Band
Concert Hall Records (195?)
