= Don Ewell =

American jazz and stride pianist (1916–1983)

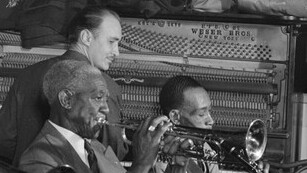
- Ewell (top) playing piano with Bunk Johnson (trumpet) and George Lewis (clarinet), Stuyvesant Casino, c. June 1946

Background information
- Born: Donald Tyson Ewell; November 14, 1916; Baltimore, Maryland, U.S.
- Died: August 9, 1983 (aged 66) Pompano Beach, Florida, U.S.
- Genres: Jazz; stride
- Occupation: Musician
- Instrument: Piano
- Formerly of: Jazz, Ltd.; Jack Teagarden; Charles Burrell

Donald Tyson Ewell (November 14, 1916 – August 9, 1983) was an American jazz and stride pianist. He worked with Sidney Bechet, Kid Ory, George Lewis, George Brunies, Muggsy Spanier, and Bunk Johnson, among others.

== Biography ==
Born in Baltimore, Maryland, Ewell played with Bill Reinhardt's Jazz, Ltd. band in Chicago in 1947–49.

From 1956 to 1962, Ewell was a member of Jack Teagarden's band. After Teagarden died, Ewell toured Europe, then returned to New Orleans and performed in clubs and hotels. From 1976 to 1978, he concertized and suffered from alcoholism while living with his friend King Denton, the manager of a jazz club where Ewell was artist-in-residence.

Ewell later moved back to his native Maryland. After his daughter's death from cancer, and after suffering two strokes, Ewell died on August 9, 1983, in Pompano Beach, Florida, aged 66.

== Discography ==
=== As leader ===
- Mama Yancey Singer / Don Ewell Pianist (Windin' Ball, 1955)
- Music to Listen to Don Ewell By (Good Time Jazz, 1957)
- Man Here Plays Fine Piano! (Good Time Jazz, 1961)
- Free 'n' Easy! (Good Time Jazz, 1962)
- Denver Concert with Barbara Dane (Pumpkin, 1966; reissued by Storyville)
- Grand Piano with Willie "the Lion" Smith (Swaggie, 1966)
- A Jazz Portrait of the Artist (Chiaroscuro, 1969)
- Don Ewell and Bob Greene... Together (Jazzology, 1970)
- Duet! with Bob Greene (Fat Cat's Jazz, 1970)
- Live at the 100 Club (77, 1971)
- Take It in Stride (Chiaroscuro, 1971)
- Don Ewell (Chiaroscuro, 1974)
- Don Ewell Trio and Quartet (Center, 1976)
- New Orleans Rascals and Don Ewell (Philips, 1976)
- In New Orleans with Herb Hall (New Orleans, 1980)
- Don Ewell and His All-Stars (Jazzology, 1981)
- Don Ewell Quintet (Jazzology, 1982)
- Chicago '57 (Stomp Off, 1984)
- Jazz on a Sunday Afternoon (Storyville, 1969)
- Memories of You with Claire Austin (Audiophile, 1993)
- Don Ewell Meets Pamela and Llew Hird with the Sydney Stompers (GHB, 1995)
- Stride Piano Duets Live in Toronto 1966 with Willie "the Lion" Smith (Delmark, 2008)

=== As sideman ===
With Barbara Dane

- Trouble in Mind (San Francisco, 1957)

With Doc Evans

- Jazz Ltd. Volume 1 (Delmark)
- Doc Evans Dixieland Band (Atlantic)

With Bunk Johnson

- Bunk Johnson with the Yerba Buena Jazz Band 1944 and with Doc Evans & His Band (Document)
- Bunk Johnson Plays Popular Songs (American Music)

With Jack Teagarden

- Mis'ry and the Blues (Verve, 1961)
