= Jazz, Ltd. =

American Dixieland jazz band (1947–1978)

- Sidney Bechet, during his first residency at Jazz, Ltd. (November 1947); Left to right: Bill Reinhardt, Danny Alvin, Bechet, Mel Grant, Munn Ware

Background information
- Origin: Chicago, Illinois
- Genre: Dixieland jazz
- Years active: 1947–1978
- Labels: Jazz, Ltd., Atlantic, Regal, Old Swing-Master, Delmark

Jazz, Ltd. was a Dixieland jazz band, nightclub and a record label in Chicago.

The band was active from June 1947 to April 1978 and was led and managed by Bill Reinhardt. The nightclub was active from June 1947 to February 1972 and was managed by his wife, Ruth Reinhardt. Bill and Ruth co-owned the nightclub. For 31 years Jazz, Ltd. renewed public interest in Dixieland jazz music—when swing music, then Bebop, then rock and roll were the dominant styles.

It was the first jazz club owned by a musician in Chicago. It provided a steady job to many jazz musicians at a time when they needed one. Bill and Ruth Reinhardt estimated that over 700 musicians played at Jazz, Ltd. Some were pioneers of Dixieland jazz. (Note: As a child, Sidney Bechet played in the band that Buddy Bolden founded and Bechet introduced the soprano saxophone to jazz. Bolden is one of the founders of jazz music. Baby Dodds played in Buddy Bolden's band and was the first jazz drummer to vary his drum patterns while keeping the beat with the bass drum, improvising while performing. Edmond Hall was born at the beginning of Dixieland jazz in 1901 into a musical family. He got his professional start in legendary Buddy Petit's band. George Brunies was also born to a musical family at the onset of jazz music and he started professionally playing at age 8 in Papa Jack Laine's Reliance Brass Band, considered the very first jazz band. Jack Teagarden, also from a family of musicians, is considered the greatest jazz trombonist in history. He invented a unique style of playing rapidly in the upper registers, that no one could duplicate, while in Ben Pollack's orchestra in the 1920s.) By hiring the best jazz musicians in the country, forbidding singing and dancing (which incurred a 20% war excise tax that put many jazz bands out of business), refusing business with the mob and playing only Dixieland jazz music, Jazz, Ltd. became one of the longest-running jazz clubs in the country.

== Notable headliners ==
Sidney Bechet, Baby Dodds, Edmond Hall, George Brunies, Jack Teagarden, Muggsy Spanier, Clancy Hayes, Les Beigel, Lil Armstrong, Art Hodes, Don Ewell, Barrett Deems, Albert Nicholas, Miff Mole, Pete Fountain, Big Sid Catlett, Bill Johnson, Big Chief Russell Moore and many others.

=== Sidney Bechet ===
The most famous musician to headline at Jazz, Ltd. was Sidney Bechet. (Note: He had played for Bunk Johnson in Buddy Bolden's band at age eleven, was famously praised at the age of 22 as "an extraordinary clarinet virtuoso" by Swiss classical conductor, Ernest Ansermet, and later played for King Oliver, Duke Ellington, Jelly Roll Morton, Louis Armstrong and many others. He is also known for introducing the soprano saxophone to jazz music and forever changing the sound of Dixieland.) Although Bill and Ruth worked hard to feature him at the opening of their new club, he was unable to appear due to illness and the club opened with Doc Evans instead.

Although Bechet was then well known in Europe, he had not been in Chicago since 1919 and his engagements at Jazz, Ltd. reinstituted his popularity in the city. By the time he appeared at the club, he was no longer playing clarinet but soprano sax exclusively. He was known for his wide vibrato (wavering pulsations) and daring improvisations, exploiting the full range of the soprano saxophone. Down Beat editor, Paul E. Miller wrote "The sounds of jazz and the fullest implications of their meanings have never been more brilliantly delineated than by Bechet." As a virtuoso, he expected the best from other bandmembers. (Note: He was also highly critical of musical performance. He endeared "musicianers", as those who refine and perfect their craft through continual learning and practicing, who have a love for it, who can remember and tell life's lessons learned by way of their music. This, Bechet attributes to his grandfather, Omar. Bechet was dismissive of technical performers and scorned those who did not perform seriously.) His engagements at Jazz, Ltd. between 1947 and 1949, drew big crowds, and he reveled in the praise bestowed upon him by guests after he completed a music set at the venue. Bechet was the headliner for four extended residencies at the club: November 1947 — June 6, 1948; a five-week engagement from August 25 to early October 1948; for nearly two months from November 1948 through January 15, 1949; and finally for a four week-engagement in September–October 1949. Unfortunately, his truancy led to litigation. (Note: Despite the hospitality the Reinhardts bestowed upon Bechet, he left unannounced before completing his contract, playing for competitors to Jazz, Ltd. Ruth Reinhardt subsequently won an injunction against Bechet and he never again played in Chicago.)

After having gone to live and work in France, Bechet made two tours of the United States, in 1951 and 1953. However, he had a long-term contract with Jazz, Ltd., giving the club an exclusive on his appearances in Chicago, a clause Bechet appeared to have forgotten. When Bechet appeared at another club in 1951, Ruth Reinhardt went to court for an injunction. On Bechet's return to Chicago in 1953, he was served with legal papers for breach of contract.

== Frequent songs heard ==
Just a Closer Walk with Thee, Jazz Me Blues, The Charleston, Tin Roof Blues, High Society, Sensation, Original Dixieland One-Step, Royal Garden Blues, I've Found a New Baby, Slide Frog Slide, Wolverine Blues

== Celebrity patrons ==
Carl Sandburg (writer), Eddie Foy Jr. (actor and one of the "Seven Little Foys"), Bert Lahr (actor), Tallulah Bankhead (actress), Miguel Covarrubias (illustrator), Nelson Algren (writer), Jan Sterling (actress), Sybil Burton (actress, wife of Richard Burton), Tom Ewell (actor), Mrs. Rose Movius Palmer (wife of grandson of Potter Palmer—retail magnate), Dr. John T. Reynolds (famous surgeon), Squirrel Ashcraft (jazz musician), Billy House (vaudevillian, actor), Jack Teagarden (jazz musician), Walter Cronkite (news reporter), Ernest Ansermet (Swiss conductor and composer who famously reviewed Sidney Bechet in 1919).

== Unique club ==
When Jazz, Ltd. opened in June, 1947 it was the only jazz club in Chicago and was the first one owned by a musician in the country. It was also the first in the city to cut records on site. Bill based the format of Jazz, Ltd. on Nick's in New York. Jazz, Ltd. was a rarity in keeping the mob from infringing. When it closed in February, 1972, Jazz, Ltd. was one of the longest operating jazz clubs in the country—24 years, 8 months. There was a $2.50 minimum (equiv. to $27.30 in 2015) but no cover charge. The club featured a visiting headliner and a house ensemble patterned after the "hot five": (trombone, clarinet, piano, saxophone or trumpet and drums). Bill originally intended to hire Omer Simeon for the clarinet position but he was not available, so Bill took that position permanently. When Jazz, Ltd. moved to a larger location in 1960, Jazz, Ltd. had either six or seven musicians which included a string bassist, guitarist or vocalist.

== Record labels ==
Jazz, Ltd., Atlantic Records, Regal Records, Old Swing-Master Records (French), Delmark Records

== Formula for success ==
=== Unconventional advertising ===
Initially, Bill and Ruth did not advertise Jazz, Ltd. in newspapers (until 1965), magazines, on radio or on TV. Instead, they promoted their club by recording their own records on site, signing and selling them. They touted on the record sleeve and on 5x7 inserts how their Jazz, Ltd. club epitomizes the best aspects of New Orleans Jazz. They printed their admission rules on business cards. They compiled a large and select mailing list to promote their club to: the social set, psychiatrists, doctors, lawyers, newspapermen, business executives and few musicians. And, they sent out 4 page brochures with recent record liner notes.

Jazz, Ltd. is a nightclub dedicated to the Jazz of the '20s and World War I era. It is a club where people who are not necessarily Jazz buffs can spend some time and enjoy themselves. It is a club for the discriminating, the fun-loving and well-mannered person who likes to frequent a well run and safe night spot.

The first advertisement for Jazz, Ltd. was an article appearing in the May 18, 1947 Sunday Chicago Tribune which stated that Paul Eduard Miller and Jazz, Ltd. were sponsoring a concert on May 25, 1947, at Kimball Hall featuring Sidney Bechet and Max Kaminsky. Jazz, Ltd. opened the following month, and in November the club headlined Sidney Bechet.

The limited seating of 81 people at the club caused a long line of people each night waiting outside and this helped to showcase Jazz, Ltd.'s popularity. During the 1950s Ruth said they were so busy that when Bill was on vacation she devised a way to increase turnover. Art Hodes led the substitute band in 20 minute sets and finished with "The Saints." Customers left happy and Ruth let in another 81 people to the club.

A business card reads: "The BEST DIXIELAND BAND in the MOST intimate atmosphere, Superb Liquors, Genteel Clientele, Acclaimed by The Press everywhere"

To entice people to Jazz, Ltd., Reinhardt dispelled half a century of common misperceptions about jazz music. He used the space on the back of his albums to tell people how Jazz, Ltd. is different:

there has been a persistent and willful notion that jazz is somehow associated with squalor and dinginess and bad ventilation, and that its partisans qualify as dedicated only if they present a take-me-home-for-twenty-two-fifty appearance. ...there has been a widespread belief that jazz is not truly jazz unless it is heard in an atmosphere of murkiness, strangulating spirits, dirty glasses and soiled napery. Unfortunately, the suspicion that jazz existed only in hideous little subterranean sweat-boxes had assumed the proportions of a tradition. (Note: This negative perception of jazz grew from the Prohibition days when gangsters ran speakeasies.)

=== Conventional advertising ===
By the 1960s, Jazz, Ltd. was doing radio commercials for Ford automobiles and Kleenex tissue, magazine advertisements for Hannah & Hogg Whiskey, newspaper ads for women's clothing, club advertisements in cabaret and tourist magazines. They also made TV appearances on NBC's Today Show and on WTTW in Chicago (1969).

=== Editorial friends ===
Ned Williams, a publicist and managing editor of Down Beat for ten years and an old friend of the Reinhardts, helped them get their club started. Noted jazz critic and columnist, Paul Eduard Miller, helped the Reinhardts with a mailing list.

Ruth persuaded friends at Chicago newspapers and jazz magazines into printing many stories about Jazz, Ltd.: "Disc jockey Dave Garroway mentions Jazz, Ltd. and our musicians because he is very fair and interested in jazz. Even though we are not part of any WMAQ commercials, he would not ignore us completely. Dale Harrison gave us a lot of space when he wrote for The Sun. Irv Kupcinet has helped us tremendously, though jazz is not his forte. Bill Leonard, directly across the street at The Journal of Commerce drops in and always has..."

There were no less than 31 editor friends of the Reinhardts whose articles contributed to the success of Jazz, Ltd. (Note: Newspaper editors:Chicago Sun Times: Irv Kupcinet, Bentley Stegner, Herman Kokan, Studs Terkel, Roy Topper, Kathryn Lewis and Mike Connelly –Chicago Tribune: Will Leonard and Herb Lyon –Chicago Daily News: Sidney Harris, Tony Weitzel and Irving Sablosky –Chicago American: Nate Gross, Ann Marsters, George Murray, Cholly Dearborn Magazine editors: George Frazier, Roger Coster, Fran Byrnne, Jim Bell, Hugh Moffet, John Tiger, Al Turner, Ned Williams, Don J. Anderson, Bill Whitsit, Jack Eigen, Dale Harrison, Paul Eduard Miller, Freeman Fulbright, John Lucas, and Jimmy Cannon) By the 1950s Jazz, Ltd. had press coverage in Time, Redbook, Collier's, Esquire, Holiday, The Second Line, Theatre Arts, Down Beat, Tiger, Civil War Roundtable, Chicago Welcome, Where, Cabaret, Chicago Tribune, Chicago Daily News, Chicago American, Chicago Sun Times, and Detroit News.

=== Admission rules ===
Having worked in Broadway shows and nightclubs since 1923 in New York, Ruth Reinhardt was well aware of the demise of jazz on 52nd Street:

...the state of disrepair into which quaint, storied old Fifty-second Street has been allowed to fall. Eddie Condon, who long ago deserted Fifty-second Street.

As far as jazz is concerned, 52nd Street is gasping for breath...Jimmy Ryan's remains to champion the cause that made the famous block a national institution.

52nd St razed by housewreckers

Bill and Ruth knew that the failure of many jazz clubs from the 1910s through the 1940s can be attributed to bad management, mob connections, illegal speakeasies, gambling, drugs, prostitution and drunkenness. So, to ensure no bad influence would tarnish Jazz, Ltd., they refused to buy alcohol from mob-owned distributors, had no cigarette machine in the club and they rigorously enforced a set of rules so strict that Ruth compared their club to a church. With this one set of rules they prevented prostitution, maintained high standards for dress, prevented under age drinking, maintained a comfortable environment and, from a financial perspective, avoided a 20% federal cabaret excise tax on singing, dancing and admissions from 1947 to 1960: (Note: This avoided a 20% federal war excise tax on "admissions, refreshment, service and merchandise at roof gardens, cabarets and similar places furnishing a public performance for profit...includes...diversion in the way of...singing...or dancing either with or without music conducted by professionals...Every form of entertainment so conducted is included, except instrumental music unaccompanied by any other form of entertainment" This destructive tax put tens of thousands of musicians out of work in the 1940s, caused many top orchestras (Benny Goodman, Harry James and Tommy Dorsey) to disband and ended swing music.)

- No unescorted ladies and no women served at the bar under any circumstances
- No women in slacks and gentlemen must wear jackets
- No minors (even 'just to listen and Not drink')
- No over-crowding
- No singing
- No dancing
- No cover charge

Additional rules are that Jazz, Ltd.:

- prohibited table-hopping
- did not tolerate drunks
- advertised with a small card on the table to refrain from song requests

=== Ruth's management style ===
Bill and Ruth Reinhardt at Jazz, Ltd. in 1957

"Ruth remembered faces, names. And she'd hip her husband with 'Oh, Bill! You remember Mr. Johnson?' And of course William remembered. Made for good business. Ruth had the ability to get people from all over the country to drop in when they were in town." "She had a talent for presiding with a subtle but firm hand"... "keeping an eagle eye on all proceedings." "Because the room is small, the tension is magnified. When an obnoxious person has to be invited to leave, everyone knows about it. Should a musician become temperamental, or should a celebrity of stage or screen walk in, all the customers are aware of it." "And [Ruth] could smell trouble a mile away." "She had a cutting, sharp kind of satirical wit that was fun to watch being used on someone that got out of line in the club. We were standing up near the front bar one night on a break when some guy got out of line with one of the waitresses. Before he knew what had happened he was standing out on Grand Avenue, his hat and coat draped over his head. But his bar bill was paid up in full, and he never knew what had hit him...Ruth had a soft, generous side to her, too." Ruth makes the analogy of gangsters to sharks, claiming she doesn't know what a gangster looks like but she wouldn't admit one in because "it's just like swimming in the ocean and waiting for a shark...to attack you. You can't see them but you know they're there." "I don't drink and am very conscious of bad behavior. We feel that people come here to hear the music. Any unnecessary noise, from a few, spoils the pleasure of the entire room."

Jazz, Ltd. paid their musicians well, $100 a week in 1948. This is equivalent to $1,340 in 2025.

Ruth claimed it was an advantage to be tone deaf when one spent eight hours a night, six nights per week in a jazz club: "Psychiatrists who come here tell me that if I heard every flat note, every wrong, voicing, I'd probably go out of my mind."

== Music management ==
"Bill called the tunes and stamped off the tempos." "Bill surrounded himself with good musicians, but the turnover at times was great. At other times, and on other chairs, some of the sidemen stayed for years." "The band was a driving, hard-working, and fun band, even if we did seem to end up with the wearies after the six-hours of romping-stomping Reinhardt sets." "If we had one thing going for us, it was that we were always working." A card on the table states: "Sometime during the evening you will hear all your favorites." The front line of the band was seated close to the customers and this made for an informal atmosphere. Musicians would chit-chat among themselves and consort with the customers.

== Criticisms ==
From the beginning, Jazz, Ltd. had its naysayers, its music format criticized and its club chastised, but the club and the band endured and succeeded beyond Bill and Ruth Reinhardt's expectations. When Jazz, Ltd. opened in June 1947 editors of the Chicago Tribune proclaimed that the club would not last more than two weeks to a month. By 1964, 27 other Dixieland clubs in Chicago either closed or ended their music policy. In 1947 there were no jazz clubs in Chicago and jazz music had been in decline since the mid-1930s. Musicians complained that the format was too rigid, that they played many of the same songs every night and that there was no dancing allowed. Playing the same popular tunes each night was common in bands; Louis Armstrong's All-Stars were known for this. The Reinhardts actually favored dancing but not at the cost of a 20% excise tax on profits (from 1947 to 1960) so they forbade it. When a patron observed that Ruth threw out many customers for bad behavior, he threatened to open a competitor across the street to accommodate them. Ruth admitted this club would have plenty of business, but she was more concerned with the happiness of the majority of their clientele, the respectable ones.

== Jazz, Ltd. building ==
Jazz, Ltd. building 11 E. Grand Ave., in 1947

The first location was at 11 East Grand Ave. and was formerly a tenement house. It was on the near north side, close to all transportation and near a parking lot. The club was just below street level as a step-down-and-into establishment. The avant-garde room was designed by artists Hugo Weber and Emerson Woelffer from the IIT Institute of Design in Chicago. The bandstand walls were made of spring steel to help resonate the band, which was on a small round carpeted deck in the back. Enlargements of recent albums adorned the other walls. Bill Reinhardt installed air-conditioning and customized acoustics in which "The softest note makes itself heard all the way to the north wall." Booths lined the walls along perimeter of the main room and while the middle was filled with small square pedestal tables having lacquered tops, surrounded by ladder-back wood chairs. Jazz, Ltd. seated 85 people and had 15 employees. Over the cash register was a sign, "ASCAP salutes Jazz, Ltd. for providing its patrons with America's finest music..." Due to Jazz, Ltd.'s small size, "most tables have to be reserved. People are turned away by the dozens, but the ones in the know called ahead and tables were held for them.

Jazz, Ltd. building 164 E. Grand Ave., in 1960

This procedure was heretofore unknown to Chicago, for a jazz spot." "We are making money and pleasing hundreds of customers weekly." One small spotlight shone on the bandstand that was situated just a foot from the tables. There was a small service bar in front. In the front window was Ziblid, a large statue ridiculing women in general. This was also used as part of the logo on Jazz, Ltd. records.

The second location was at 164 East Grand Ave. In 1960, the 11 East Grand locale was vacated when the American Medical Association bought the property for their high-rise office building. The new location was twice the size of the former one, with more seats, a larger stage to accommodate a bassist and guitarist, and a dance floor. This second building was more in keeping with New Orleans' style, in Spanish Colonial Revival architecture. Ruth controlled multiple spotlights on the band to match the mood of the music. This location also had microphones and a speaker system and featured a singer. Due to the union's limit of five-day regular gigs, Franz Jackson's Original Jass All Stars played on Thursday nights. They began announcing songs here and permitted dancing.

Until 1960, the club was open from 9 PM to 4 AM weekdays and closed Sundays and after 1960 it was open from 9 PM to 5 AM Sunday mornings through a late-hour license.

== "Jazz, Ltd." moniker ==
Ruth Reinhardt: "Limited space suggested the final name. Jazz, Ltd. has caused much comment, and, having worked for Billy Rose for four consecutive years (1931–35), I realize the commercial value of comment" "Jazz, Ltd." is a registered trademark.

== Anecdotes ==
Rules recoil. Before pant suits came, Jazz, Ltd. didn't allow slacks in their club because they are a part of The Establishment. A woman came in once wearing slacks and Ruth offered her a coat if she removed her slacks. She agreed. That woman got drunk and when leaving she took the coat off, showing her girdle; the men gawked at her. So, Ruth took her to the coat check room and helped her put her slacks back on.

Caviling Coward. Noël Coward and Talullah Bankhead came to "a beastly little club" and sat at a table right under the trumpet. Noel thought the music so cacophonic that he walked out holding his ears with Talullah behind him. The customers were delighted.

Tit for tat – as told by Dick Wellstood and Joan Hulbert. Trombonist Munn Ware, seeing Bechet sit down after playing a solo on Tiger Rag, believed he was done. So, Munn then stood up and started blowing. Sidney promptly jumped to his feet and resumed where he had left off. Munn politely sat down and awaited the end of the soprano saxophone solo, and Sidney sat down. But again, just as Munn rose Sidney leapt up and recommenced playing, much to the amusement of the crowd. Sidney pretended to stop, but kept playing. Munn took out a water pistol (used to oil his slide) and shot Sidney on the back of the neck, causing water to soak his shirt and suit. Dick was terrified but kept playing, waiting for the sky to fall, wondering what Sidney would do when his part was done. He did nothing but sit down and laugh. Then, Munn laughed, Bill laughed, the guests laughed and, finally, Dick laughed.

Bamboozled Bechet. One night when friend and actor Donald McKee visited Jazz, Ltd., Ruth confided to him that she was remiss in managing Sidney Bechet's misbehaving. So, Ruth introduced Don to Sidney as "Doc" McKee. The "doc" took Bechet to the back room, removed a terrible looking green liquid filled vaccine (nail polish) in a large syringe from a doctor's bag and scolded him sternly with it while holding it up to his nose: "You get out of line once more, and Ruth will give you a jab with this that will make you wish you'd behaved." Bechet was terrified and promised the "doctor" he'd be good and he never misbehaved again.

Talullah's throne. While Jazz, Ltd. was moving to their new address on Grand Avenue, a frequent guest of theirs, Mr. McCorkle, asked Ruth Reinhardt to save a particular thing from the first club of great interest to him, no matter how odd it seemed. So, when McCorkle got the package he pleaded for pianist Art Hodes to come over right away to the new club to witness 'the unveiling'. It is a gilded toilet seat, which underneath has a note reading, "Talullah Bankhead sat here."

== Other engagements ==
June 18, 1959	at International Trade Fair daily Navy Pier show
September 3, 1959	at Dixieland night at O'Hare Stadium
November 8, 1959	Jazz For Moderns concert at Municipal Auditorium
December 13, 1964	at benefit for Father Robert Owens in American Legion hall
March 28, 1965	Jazz, Ltd. Dixieland benefit matinee for Chicago heart fund in American Legion hall
October 8, 1967	March of Dimes show at Illinois State University fieldhouse
August 1968	plays in front of the Tribune Tower
July 18, 1969	plays at opening of Arlington Towers Horseshoe club at the Arlington International Racecourse
February 27, 1972	plays London House on Michigan Ave. for five Mondays
May 24, 1972	plays Saturday nights at The Corona
November 5, 1972	appears Monday nights at Redhead Lounge in Sheraton
June 13, 1973	concert at State Street and Quincy Court
December 30, 1973	to play at Flaming Sally's in January
August 31, 1974	in Wellington Oakdale Old Glory Marching Society Marching Band (for St. Joseph's Hospital)
July 6, 1976	Concert at First National Plaza Oakbrook

== Prospects for another Jazz, Ltd. ==
In 1970, Bill and Ruth Reinhardt, along with investors, were building a new Jazz, Ltd. club in the warmer climate of the Bahamas but it did not materialize since the only prospective buyers of the Chicago club wished to convert it into a restaurant.

== Musicians ==
- Alvin Alcorn (t)
- Jack Alexander (t)
- Lil Armstrong (p)
- Bill Bachmann (t)
- Bobby Ballard (t)
- Paul Barbarin (d)
- Floyd Bean (p)
- Sidney Bechet (ss, cl)
- Jim Beebe (tb)
- Les Beigel (t)
- Ralph Blank (p)
- Will Bradley (t)
- Hillard Brown (d)
- George Brunies (tb)
- Hal Carnes (b)
- Big Sid Catlett (d)
- Doc Cenardo (d)
- Frank Chace (cl)
- Garner Clark (c)
- Rozelle Claxton (p)
- Zinky Cohn (p)
- Jerry Coleman (d)
- Bill Corti (tb)
- Spanky Davis (t)
- Sidney de Paris (t)
- Sammy Dean (d)
- Barrett Deems (d)
- Dave DeVore (b)
- Ray Dixon (p)
- Baby Dodds (d)
- Doc Evans(c)
- Don Ewell (p)
- Pete Fountain (cl)
- Harlen Floyd (t)
- Jack Gardner (p)
- Tommy Gekler (tb)
- George Gerard (t)
- Walt Gifford (d)
- Rabbitt Gonzalez (s)
- Bobby Gordon (cl)
- Wally Gordon (d)
- Jimmy Granato (c)
- Mel Grant (p)
- Harry Graves (tb)
- Fred Greenleaf (t)
- Edmond Hall (cl)
- Clancy Hayes (v)
- Chuck Hedges (cl)
- Joanne Henderson (v)
- Eddie Higgins (p)
- Art Hodes (p)
- Max Hook (p)
- Darnell Howard (cl)
- Ralph Hutchinson (tb)
- Don Ingle (t)
- Jack Ivett (t)
- Franz Jackson (sax, cl)
- Thomas Jefferson (t)
- Al Jenkins (tb)
- Bill Johnson (sb)
- Wayne Jones (d)
- Waldren "Frog" Joseph (tb)
- Duke Kane (t)
- Freddie Kohlman (d)
- Julian "Digger" Laine (tb)
- Preacher Rollo Laylan (d)
- Carroll Lee (p)
- Bobby Lewis (t)
- Art Lyons (cl)
- Marty Marsala (t)
- Joe Masek (cl, s)
- Joyce Lacy McDonald (p)
- Big Mike McKendrick (bj, g, v)
- Jimmy McPartland (c)
- Max Miller (p)
- Miff Mole (t)
- Big Chief Russell Moore (tb)
- Freddy Moore (d)
- Norman Murphy (t)
- Sy Nelson (sb)
- Albert Nicholas (cl)
- Del Noel (t)
- Dick Oakley (t)
- Floyd O'Brien (t)
- Mike Parker (t)
- Dick Pendleton (cl)
- Dave Phelps (p)
- Lloyd Phillips (p)
- Lionel Prowling (p)
- Dave Rasbury (tb)
- Jack Reid (tb)
- Bill Reinhardt (cl, v)
- Dave Remington (tb, p)
- Chet Roble (p)
- Wally Rose (p)
- Bob Saltmarsh (d)
- Art Sandly (bj)
- Ray Sassetti (t)
- Red Saunders (d)
- Emanuel Sayles (bj)
- Eddie Schaefer (tb)
- Doc Schliesmann (bj)
- Bob Schroeder (cl)
- Zutty Singleton (d)
- Tut Soper (p)
- Muggsy Spanier (c)
- Charlie Spero (cl)
- Joe Sullivan (p)
- Jack Teagarden (tb)
- Blanche Thomas (v)
- Don Thompson (t)
- Marshall Thompson (d)
- Bill Tinkler (t)
- Nappy Trottier (t)
- Johnny Vine (d)
- Munn Ware (tb)
- Earl Washington (p)
- Dick Wellstood (p)
- Kenny White (sb)
- Joe Wiedman (t)
- Quinn Wilson (sb, ssph)
- Johnny Windhurst (t)

Original Jazz, Ltd. band members: Bill Reinhardt (cl), Doc Evans (c), Don Ewell (p), Danny Alvin (d), Munn Ware (tb).

Franz Jackson's Original Jass All Stars members: Franz Jackson (sax, cl), Bob Schoffner (tp), Albert Wynn (tb).

This represents about 1/7th of all musicians at Jazz, Ltd. starting in 1947.

== Records ==
Album Title	Label, Catalog #	Release date
The Jazz, Ltd. album	Jazz, Ltd 101, 201, 301, 401	March 1949
Dixieland at Jazz, Ltd. Volume 1	ALS 139	1949
A Tribute to Jazz, Ltd.	Jazz, Ltd. U2604, U2605	1952
Dixieland at Jazz, Ltd. Volume 2	ALS 140	1952
Jazz, Ltd. Volume 3: Dixieland by Request	JL 1003	1955
Dixieland at Jazz, Ltd.	Atlantic 1261	1957
Jazz Unlimited at Jazz, Ltd.	JL 1004	1958
Jazz at Jazz, Ltd.	Atlantic 1338	1961
Reinhardt! Reinhardt!! where were you last night? "at Jazz, Ltd. of course"	Jazz, Ltd. 11/164	1964
Jazz, Ltd. Presents Requiem for 2 Champs	Jazz, Ltd.	1967
Illinois Sequicentenial Official State Song "Illinois"	Jazz, Ltd. 821J-2939	1968
Jazz, Ltd. Volume 1	Delmark DE-226	1994

== Notes and references ==
=== Bibliography ===
- anon_1 (December 15, 1948). "52nd Street Gasping Last Gasps As Deuces Move Music to Clique". Down Beat: 1.
- anon_2 (1955). Dixieland by Request at Jazz, Ltd (Liner notes). Jazz, Ltd band. Jazz, Ltd.
- anon_3 (September 1, 1959). "One Woman's World". Las Vegas Daily Optic. Las Vegas, NM: UPI. p. 3.
- anon_4 (September 1, 1959). "Tone Deafness Is Advantage". The Bakersfield Californian. Bakersfield, CA: UPI. p. 13.
- anon_5 (1998). "Charles "Buddy" Bolden". New Orleans Jazz. National Park Service.
- anon_6 (June 6, 1944). "Conferees Vote to Cut Cabaret Tax to 20 Pct". Philadelphia Inquirer. Philadelphia, PA. p. 6.
- anon_7 (January 28, 1944). "Conferees Vote Tax Increases". Bluefield Daily Telegraph. Bluefield, WV. p. 1.
- anon_8 (March 7, 1942). "Cabaret Tax Bill Text; Suggestions to Operators". The Billboard: 60.
- anon_10 (May 18, 1947). "part 6, p. 4, col. 2". Chicago Tribune Archives. Chicago Tribune.
- anon_11 (September 27, 1958). "After Dark". WHERE Magazine: 13.
- Beebe, Jim (1994). Jazz, Ltd. vol 1 (Liner notes). Jazz, Ltd. band. Delmark Records.
- Bechet, Sidney (2002). Treat it Gentle, an Autobiography, Sidney Bechet. Boston, MA: Da Capo Press. ISBN 978-0-306-81108-1.
- Burns, Ken (2001). "PBS – JAZZ A Film By Ken Burns: Selected Artist Biography: Sidney Bechet". The New Grove Dictionary of Jazz. Oxford University Press. Archived from the original on January 24, 2001.
- Campbell, Michael; Brody, James (1999). Rock and Roll: An Introduction, 2nd ed. Stamford, CT: Thomson Schirmer Books. ISBN 978-0-534-64295-2.
- Chilton, John (1987). Sidney Bechet: The Wizard of Jazz. Boston, MA: Da Capo Press. ISBN 978-0-306-80678-0.
- Choice, Harriet (June 18, 1971). "Jazz By Choice; It's been 25 years for city's oldest". Chicago Tribune. Chicago, IL: Tribune Co. p. 11 § 2.
- Choice, Harriet (September 19, 1969). "The Jazz Sound". Chicago Tribune. Chicago, Illinois: Tribune Co. p. 10 § 2.
- Coward, Noel; Payne, Graham; Morley, Sheridan (1982). The Noël Coward diaries. Boston, MA: Little, Brown and Company. p. 90 ¶1. ISBN 978-0-8264-7699-9.
- Demlinger, Sandor; Steiner, John (2003). Destination Chicago Jazz. Arcadia Publishing. p. 99. ISBN 978-0-7385-2305-7.
- Felton, Eric (March 17, 2013). "How the Taxman Cleared the Dance Floor". Wall Street Journal.
- Forbes, Mike (August 13, 2015). Louis Armstrong's All Stars: the last great era of his life and music. ISBN 978-1-326-38499-9.
- Frazier, George (1951). Dixieland At Jazz, Ltd (Liner notes). Jazz, Ltd. band. Atlantic Records.
- Frazier, George (1952). A Tribute to Jazz, Ltd (Liner notes). Jazz, Ltd band. Jazz, Ltd.
- Gilmore, Thomas B. (June 1999). "The Dean of Chicago Jazz Trombonists". The Mississippi Rag: 4.
- Gorder, Erica (1998). Art Hodes Papers 1918–1992. Series 8 Writings, Subseries 8B. Typed Essays, Box 12, folder 22: Institute of Jazz Studies, Rutgers University Libraries.
- Green, Doc (February 9, 1965). "Soaking Up Some Chicago Jazz". The Detroit News. Detroit, MI: Jonathan Wolman. p. 14 D.
- Hodes, Art; Hansen, Chadwick (1992). Hot Man -- The Life Of Art Hodes. Champaign, IL: University of Illinois Press. pp. 96–98. ISBN 978-0-252-01753-7.
- Ingle, Don (November 1977). "See what the boys in the backroom will have". The Mississippi Rag: 8–10.
- Jarenwattananon, Patric (April 16, 2013). "How Taxes And Moving Changed The Sound Of Jazz". NPR.
- Johnson, Michael (January 25, 2015). "The Wailing Vibrato of Sidney Bechet". Archived from the original on July 8, 2015.
- Jones, Wayne (1994). Jazz, Ltd. vol 1 (Liner notes). Jazz, Ltd. band. Delmark Records.
- Jules, Bergis; Calahan, Lisa (2006). "Paul Eduard Miller Collection". Black Metropolis Research Consortium Survey.
- Koester, Bob (2001). "Bill Reinhardt and Jazz, Ltd". rhythm & news. Delmark Records. Archived from the original on 2016-03-05.
- Larkin, Philip (2004). Jazz Writings: Essays and Reviews. New York, NY: Continuum. p. 28 ¶1. ISBN 978-0-8264-7699-9.
- Leonard, Will (August 6, 1967). "On The Town, Chicago Visitor". Chicago Tribune. Chicago, IL: Tribune Company. p. 11§ 5.
- Leonard, William (1949). The Jazz, Ltd. Album (Liner notes). Jazz, Ltd band. Jazz, Ltd.
- Leonard, Will (August 24, 1968). "Will Leonard". Chicago Tribune Archives. Chicago Tribune.
- Miller, Paul Edwuard (December 3, 1947). "Bechet's Jazz, Ltd. Date First In Chi. Since 1918". Down Beat: 5.
- Morgan, Thomas L. (2007). "The First Real Critical Discussion of Jazz". Archived from the original on 2014-10-18.
- Muranyi, Joe (1961). Jazz at Jazz, Ltd (Liner notes). Jazz, Ltd. band. Atlantic Records.
- Newman, W.M.; Willner, Jack (April 22, 1964). "Escaping the Mob". Chicago Daily News. Chicago, IL. p. 1.
- Fulbright, Freeman (October 11, 1950). "Jazz Limited To Dixieland, Intimate Chicago Winery Gives Beat to Revival in Old Stronghold". The Daily Independent: 5.
- Reed, Rod (October 15, 1945). "Blue Notes". Down Beat. 277 (2): 18. Bibcode:1997SciAm.277b..18S. doi:10.1038/scientificamerican0897-18.
- Reinhardt, Bill; Coller, Derek; Whyatt, Bert (June 1, 1993). "Bill Reinhardt: Jazz, Ltd. – And More". Storyville. 154: 136–147.
- Reinhardt, Bill; Reinhardt, Ruth (December 1994). Jazz, Ltd. Vol. 1 (CD). Chicago: Delmark Records. ASIN B000004BEG.
- Reinhardt, Ruth Sato (April 21, 1948). "Jazz, Ltd. Owner Tells Tavern's Tale". Down Beat. 15 (8): 17.
- Reinhardt, Ruth (1955). Jazz, Ltd. advertisement album card insert (Jazz, Ltd. Volume 3: Dixieland by Request). Chicago, IL: Jazz, Ltd.
- Reinhardt, Ruth Sato (February 1970). "Jazz, Ltd". International Musician: 5.
- R.E.M.W. (March 25, 1944). "Tables for Two". The New Yorker. p. 57.
- Rotzoll, Brenda Warner (February 18, 2001). "OBITUARY: Bill Reinhardt – owned Jazz, Ltd. club on Grand". Chicago Sun-Times. Chicago, IL: The Tribune Company. p. 71.
- Schmidt-Jones, Catherine (February 22, 2006). "Jack Teagarden. OpenStax CNX".
- Shifra (April 10, 2013). "Liberals, Taxes, and Unintended Consequences". Tammy Bruce Presents Live Wire.
- Stearns, Marshall Winslow (1970). The Story of Jazz. New York, NY: Oxford University Press. ISBN 978-0-19-501269-9.
- Tyle, Chris (2005). "The 1920s in Jazz".
- US Dept Revenue (1922). "Regulations 43, Part 1, Relating to the Tax on Admissions". U.S. Dept. of Revenue. Chap. 3 pp. 17-20.
- Van Vorst, Paige (Spring 1997). "Sidney Bechet: A Centenary of Remembrance". Jazz Beat. 8 (4): 24 Col.2 ¶3.
- Weld, Phil (June 13, 1963). "So Who Cares About 'Cleo,' Says Mrs. Burton Here". Chicago American. Chicago, IL. p. 1.
- Wiedrich, Robert (March 8, 1970). "Tower Ticker". Chicago Tribune. Chicago Tribune Archives. p. 2b, ¶2 § 1.
- Williams, Jack (February 14, 2001). "OBITUARIES Bill Reinhardt, 94; jazz musician, club owner". San Diego Union. San Diego.
- Williams, Ned (August 8, 1981). "Obituaries". New York Times. New York, NY.
