= Volley =

Volley or Volly may refer to:

== People ==
- Volly De Faut (1904–1973), American jazz reed player
- Paul Volley (born 1971), English rugby union player

== Sports ==
In some sports, striking a ball before it bounces on the ground (air-borne).

- Volley (association football)
- Volley (tennis)
- Volley (pickleball)

=== Volleyball teams ===
- Paris Volley, a professional volleyball team based in Paris, France
- Piemonte Volley, a professional volleyball team based in Cuneo, Italy
- Trentino Volley, a professional volleyball team based in Trento, Italy
- Vicenza Volley, a professional volleyball club based in Vicenza, Italy
- Volley Bergamo, a women's volleyball team based in Bergamo, Italy
- Volley Treviso, a professional volleyball team based in Treviso, Italy

== Other uses ==
- Volley fire, the simultaneous firing of a number of projectiles or missiles
- Volley (shoe), a brand of sandshoe popular in Australia
- Volley (film), a 2014 Spanish comedy film
