= Bob Greene (musician) =

American jazz musician (1922–2013)

Bob Greene (September 4, 1922, New York City – October 13, 2013, Amagansett, New York) was an American jazz pianist and bandleader.

Greene was active early in his career in Dixieland jazz revival groups, working with Sidney De Paris, Baby Dodds, Conrad Janis, and Johnny Wiggs. He then left music for a time, taking a degree at Columbia University and working in radio and speechwriting, including for Lyndon Johnson and Robert F. Kennedy. In the late 1960s he began performing professionally again, working with Zutty Singleton; after Robert Kennedy's assassination, he quit speechwriting to focus on music full-time. He worked in the early 1970s with Don Ewell, Albert Nicholas, and the Peruna Jazz Band, and put together a traveling ensemble which paid tribute to the music of Jelly Roll Morton. This group toured worldwide and recorded several albums; among his sidemen in this setting were Danny Barker, Tommy Benford, Herb Hall, Milt Hinton, and Johnny Williams.

Greene was the nephew of Paul Blum, a former intelligence officer. Greene wrote a biography of Blum which was published in 1998.

== Discography ==
- Don Ewell Bob Greene Duet! (Fat Cat's Jazz, 1970)
- Bob Greene's The World Of Jelly Roll Morton (RCA, 1974)
- Pretty Baby (soundtrack) (ABC Records, 1978)
- More Live in Amagansett - New Orleans Society Orchestra Live at Estia Cantina (PopFree Records, 2007)

=== As guest musician ===
- At Preservation Hall Johnny Wiggs (Pearl Records, 1965)
- City of a Million Dreams Johnny Wiggs (Fat Cat's Jazz, 1973)
- Double Time Leon Redbone (Warner Bros., 1977)
