= Ruth Sato =

Broadway dancer, columnist, and promoter

- Kaiku Sato
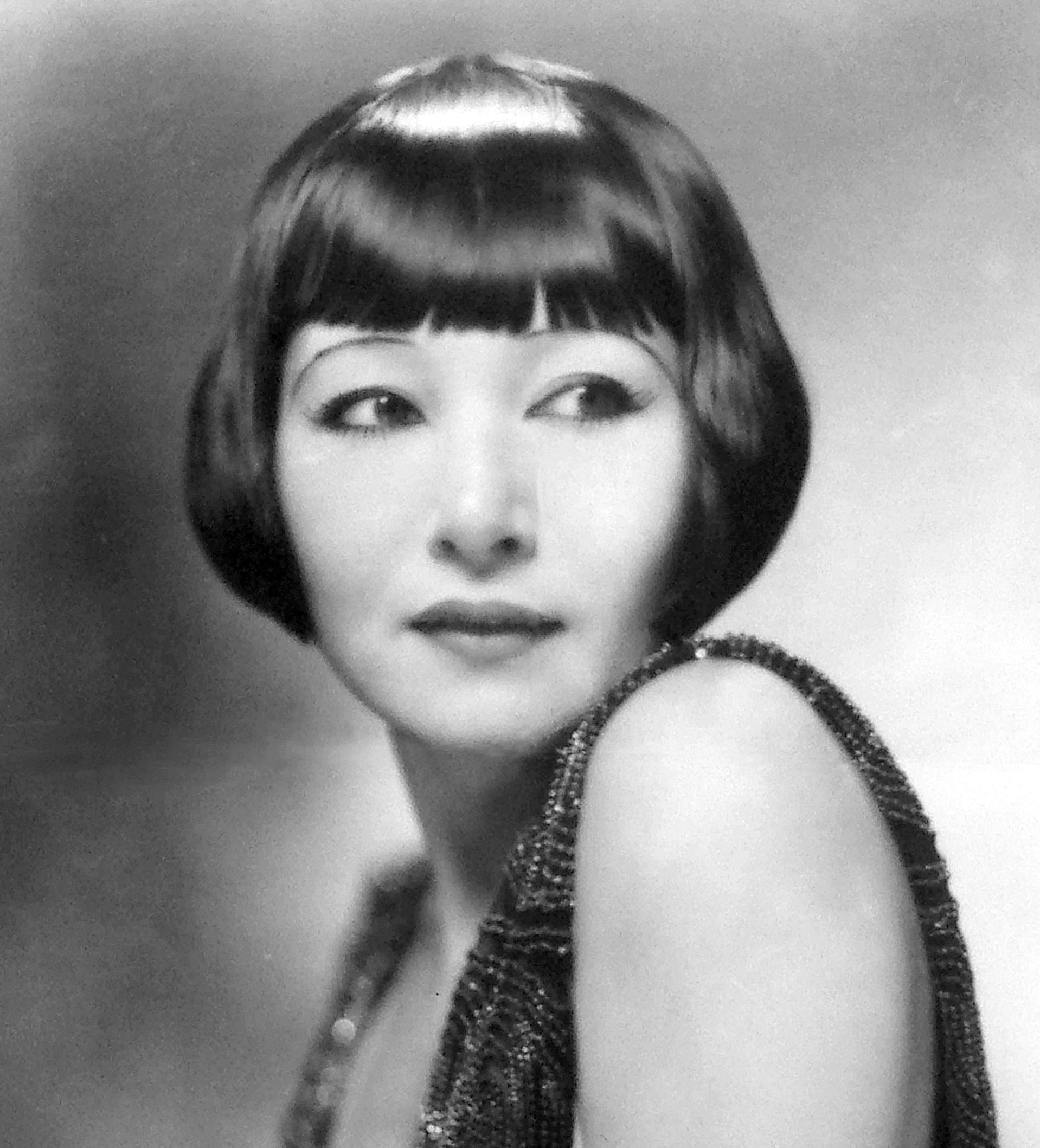
- Ruth in Sweet and Low, 1930
- Born: December 12, 1904; New York City, U.S.
- Died: December 9, 1992 (aged 87); San Diego, California, U.S.
- Occupations: dancer, gossip columnist, musician promoter and nightclub manager
- Years active: 1922-1972
- Spouse: Bill Reinhardt (June 1942 – December 1992; her death)

Ruth Sato (1904–1992) was a Broadway chorus dancer, gossip columnist, musician promoter and nightclub manager. She was known as the first Japanese chorus girl on Broadway, where she worked for 20 years. She worked for about ten years as a gossip columnist and musician promoter and for 25 years managing Jazz, Ltd., a Chicago Dixieland jazz nightclub, with her husband, Bill Reinhardt.

== Family ==
Ruth was born in Manhattan, New York City, New York to a Japanese father, Masazo Sato, and an Irish mother, Grace Bedeliah McIntyre. She said in the press that she inherited her Japanese father's stoicism and her Irish mother's volatility. (Note: 'Sato' is Japanese for 'sugar.') Her father was a successful art importer, florist and antique dealer in Manhattan. Ruth is related to the 39th Prime Minister of Japan, Eisaku Satō. Ruth's grand-nephew, Alastar McNeil, is a performer with the Beatles tribute band, RAIN. While Ruth lived with her parents in Manhattan, her father took her on many trips to Japan for her to learn her cultural heritage. In high school Ruth's ambition was to be a school teacher (she studied education for less than a year at Barnard College in New York). Her vocational guide enlightened Ruth that her status as a Japanese teacher in a white country may not be taken seriously. The guide inquired: "What school do you think might hire you?" On the advice of this guide and her father, Ruth became a dancer. (Note: Although the college has thus far been unable to verify this, several newspapers, including one authored by Ruth report it. The 1940 census also indicates one year of college.) Ruth liked French and Russian literature and she read James Joyce, Marcel Proust and the Goncourt brothers. In her youth she was fascinated with American entertainment but dismissive of Japanese artifacts.

When in 1950 Ruth asked a reporter, "Why should I bring kids into the world to bat their heads against a wall?" she metaphorically suggests that children cannot rationalize society's prejudice against their mixed race origin. Ruth's Irish mother, Della, was ostracized by her family when she married Ruth's Japanese father, Masazo. To ensure that parents of white children whom Masazo's children socialized with did not worry about them marrying an oriental person in the future, Masazo moved his family frequently. The resultant feeling of unsettledness lasted throughout Ruth's life.

== Acclaimed beauty ==
In her prime, Ruth was a petite 104 pounds and 5'-1" tall with measurements of 34-24-34 ½ and was a 'beautiful Japanese star." Columnist Walter Winchell called her "the Japanese doll with brains." Billy Rose called her "the most beautiful Eurasion in the world." She was prideful of her Irish-Japanese heritage: "… For extreme beauty I think the Eurasian type takes the prize. The Eurasian, you know, has the characteristics and the features of both the Caucasian and the Oriental." In 1936 Ruth declined an offer by Vanity Fair to enter a national beauty contest on the premise that love, affection and character are far more important factors than beauty. During her show business years she wore the popular 1920s bob cut and bangs hairdo. Many of her promotional photos in scantily clad attire accentuate her figure.

== Dancing ==
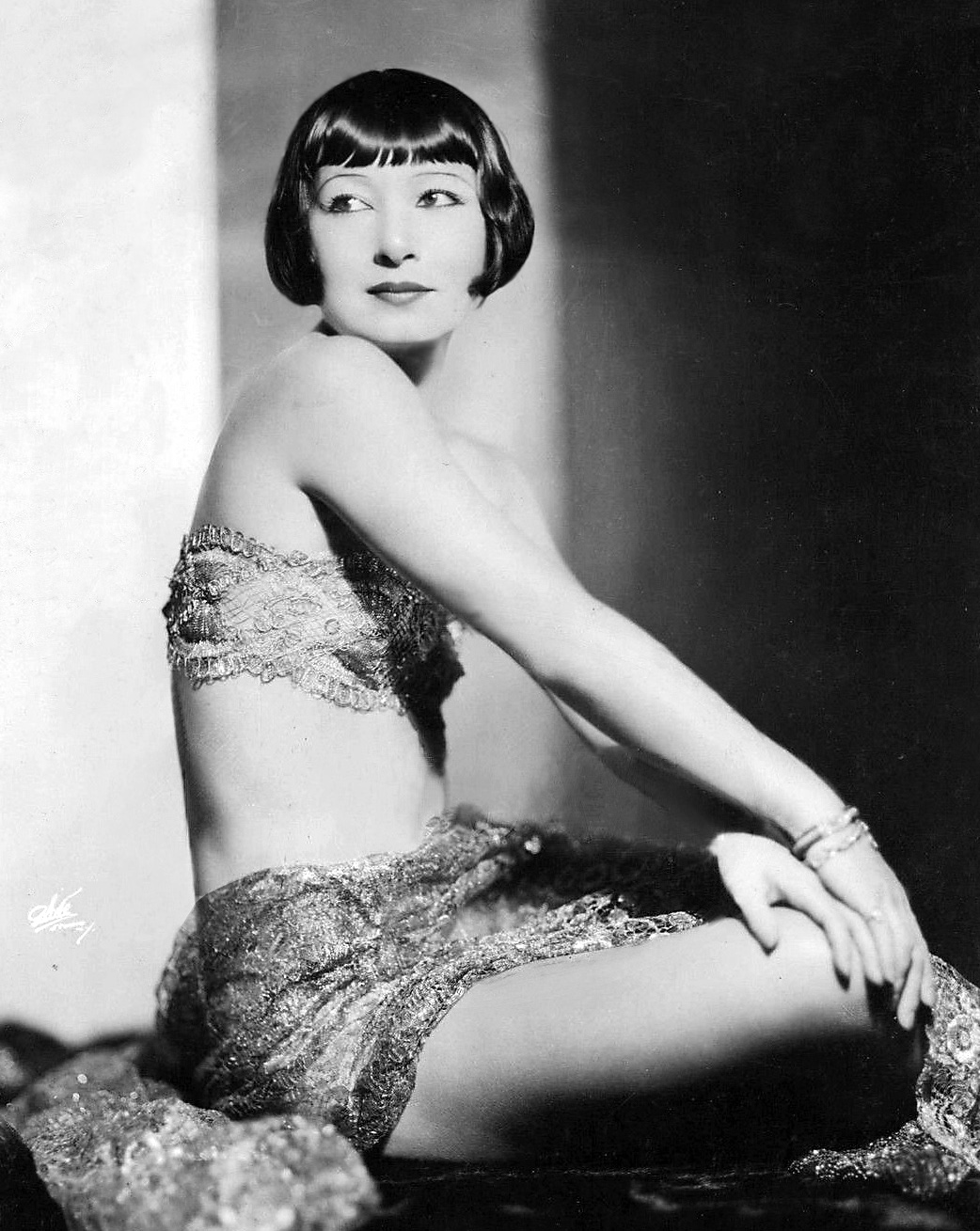
Ruth Sato in Crazy Quilt, 1933

Ruth entered show business about 1923 when her friend, Blanche Mehaffey, told of her fun experiences at the Ziegfeld Follies. Ruth dropped out of Barnard College and signed a contract to dance chorus at the New York Hippodrome theater (three miles from her house). (Note: This was most likely in "Better Times," the last show there.) She then sought out and performed at many of the top New York City nightclubs, speakeasies and Broadway theaters until the mid-1940s, including: the original Cotton Club, Savoy Ballroom, Onyx Club, Reisenweber's Cafe, Adrian's Tap Room, Smalls Paradise, Helen Morgan's 54th Street Club, The Nest, Nick's, and Leon & Eddie's. She was the first Japanese performer on Broadway and one of the first chorus girls who sought to produce her own Broadway show. From 1922 to 1936 she worked as a chorus girl, singing and dancing in musicals. Early on Ruth worked for Broadway producer Vinton Freedley then for Arthur Hammerstein and then for Billy Rose (1931-1935). Ruth performed in at least eight Broadway musicals: "Song of the Flame", "The Wild Rose", "Lady Do", "Funny Face," "Hold Everything," "Sweet and Low," "Billy Rose’s Crazy Quilt", and "Heads Up." The highly acclaimed shows were: Funny Face, Hold Everything!, Song of the Flame, Heads Up, and George White's Scandals. (Note: This was most likely the 1936 Scandals (hypothesis of author based on Billy Rose writing music for this version and Ruth’s friend, Bert Lahr, being in it.))

=== Famous co-stars ===
Some of the notable vaudevillian performers she worked with include: Fanny Brice (Crazy Quilt, Sweet and Low) Fred and Adele Astaire (Funny Face), Milton Berle (Casino de Paree theater-restaurant), Bert Lahr (Hold Everything), Jimmy Durante (Casino de Paree theater-restaurant), George Jessel (Sweet and Low), Victor Moore (Funny Face, Hold Everything, Heads Up), Eleanor Powell (Crazy Quilt road tour, and Casino de Paree theater-restaurant), Ann Pennington (Crazy Quilt), Anita Page (Crazy Quilt), Ray Bolger (Heads Up) and Sterling Holloway (East Wind). In 1932 The Japan Times awarded Ruth a prize for being the most popular Japanese woman in America.

=== Other nightclub engagements ===
Beginning in December 1933 Ruth worked as a dancer for producer Billy Rose at his theater-restaurant, Casino de Paree, on 54th street near Broadway. There, Ruth met the novelist John O’Hara, with whom she had an affair. In June 1936 she was working at The Penthouse nightclub in Boston. By December 1939, songwriter George MacKinnon introduced Ruth to the famous nightclub, Leon & Eddie's on 52nd Street, where she played stooge to "Eddie Davis" and danced. In May 1941 Ruth was dancing at Ching's Waikiki club on 52nd Street. She was also dancing at the Chinese nightclub, Forbidden City, on 58th Street, which featured American music by an all Chinese cast. Ruth helped to start this club.

=== Musical productions and solo debut ===
Ruth performed in one of George White's Scandals and may have been in one of the Ziegfeld Follies. She performed in a Casino de Paree road tour in 1934.

Ruth said she was lucky and happy to be a chorus girl (for 13 years), but she couldn't advance beyond chorus line work since producers had "typed" her in this role, stymieing her. In Ruth's words: "...although I am an American, born in New York, I would like to do something to show that it's possible for one of eastern blood to make a success in the western amusement world…" After four years of trying, Ruth's big break came in June 1935, when she met producer Harry Gourfain at the Metropolitan Theater in Boston. For the show ‘Round the World Cruise,’ (Note: Gourfain was a well known stage producer. His biography was published in the Long Island Daily Press, September 30, 1939, p. 26. The paper is indexed on the Old Fulton NY Postcards website. Entering "Harry Gourfain of Baldwin" in the search box goes directly to his bio."Harry Gourfain") Ruth persuaded Gourfain to allow her to do specialty tap dancing in jazz numbers. She succeeded. Ruth later danced ballet: in "Song of the Flame" in 1936, with choreographer Lew Christensen, in "East Wind," an allegorical ballet at the St. Louis Municipal Opera, in August, 1940 and later with Sterling Holloway in the roadshow version.

== Prospective producer ==
In April 1929 Ruth bought the Japanese rights to ‘Hold Everything’ from producers Alex Aarons and Vinton Freedley so she could produce her own Japanese version of the American show for Japanese patrons at the Imperial Theater in Japan. She was to be the first-ever to introduce an American vaudeville show to Japan. She had many of the details planned—the costumes, the translated Japanese lyrics, the financial backing, help from her father, technical and musical directors, etc. This was widely written about in the press. However, the October 1929 stock market crash and the subsequent Depression halted her plans.

== Music promoter ==
In the course of over 20 years, Ruth had the opportunity to learn much about the nightclub business. It is reported that she knew all of the members of the Count Basie, Duke Ellington, Benny Goodman and Jimmie Lunceford bands. She also worked as a gossip columnist for Down Beat jazz magazine under Ned Williams, for The Boston Record under George MacKinnon (1938), for Swing magazine under Barry Ulanov and for The Boston Post. (Note: This magazine’s full name is "Swing, the Guide to Modern Music") She was a publicist for the Count Basie Orchestra in the late ‘30s. She worked with George Avakian and Jack Jenny when he recorded "Stardust" with his band. She did publicity for about 90% of all swing bands of the 1930s, including Count Basie, Woody Herman, Mary Lou Williams, Bobby Hackett and others.

== Marriages ==
Ruth was married twice, first to the Hungarian director, Gustave Basco, from 1931 to 1936, then to jazz musician, Bill Reinhardt from 1942 until her death in 1992. Ruth never had children. She met Bill at the oriental Forbidden City nightclub in New York City at which both were performing. They were married two weeks after they met in June 1942 in Norfolk, Virginia, where he was stationed in the military.

== Nightclub manager ==
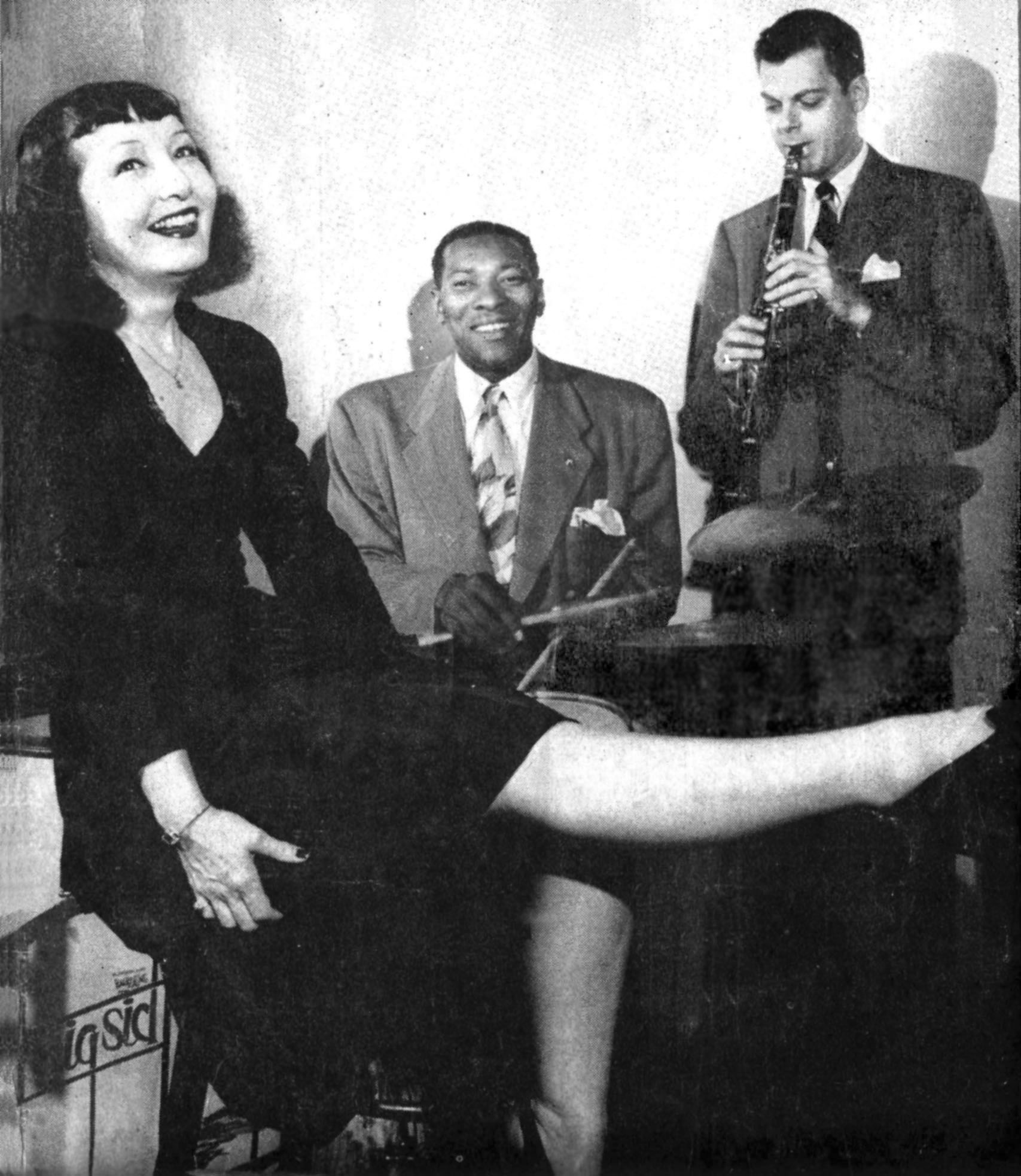
Bill and Ruth Reinhardt with Sid Catlett at Jazz, Ltd.,1949

Bill and Ruth made plans to start their own jazz nightclub when Bill entered the Navy during World War II. They agreed upon a high class operation, devoid of influence from the mob, rowdy people, drugs and prostitution, which were quite common in nightclubs of the 1940s. Ruth was well aware that New York's 52nd Street developed a bad reputation for this, having worked there since the early 1920s. Jazz Ltd's motto was clear: "If you want to dance, go to the Aragon Ballroom. If you want to drink, try any bar. You can make love in a taxi. But if you want to hear Dixieland, this is the place." No unescorted women were allowed unless they sat with Ruth at the bar. Men had to wear suit jackets and women could not wear trousers. Ruth did the marketing, booking, was the hostess, and enforced the rules.

In June 1947, they opened Jazz, Ltd. in Chicago, which featured Dixieland Jazz of the 1910s and ‘20s and other jazz musicians from across the country. Ruth and Bill were originally going to open a club in New York but Dixieland music was dead there after World War I, so they chose Chicago. With Ruth’s extensive Broadway experience and her own publicity, she booked talent and attracted customers from around the world to Jazz, Ltd. Some renowned names in Jazz played at Jazz, Ltd. Ruth and Bill estimated that over 700 musicians played their. While Ruth managed the club, Bill played clarinet in the band. "It was open six nights per week from 9 pm to 4 am and was busy all the time, except for holidays."

"Ruth remembered many people’s names and faces and her hospitality made for good rapport. Her ability to preside over the club with a subtle yet firm hand made Jazz, Ltd. one of the most pleasant clubs in Chicago." Ruth took only one vacation in 17 years working 48 hours per week at Jazz, Ltd.

== Personality ==
Ruth was entrepreneurial, gracious, and outgoing. (Note: Ruth was: the first Japanese chorus girl in America, a music promoter, a columnist, a night club owner and manager, and she planned to be the first chorus girl to produce her own musical show.) (Note: She always thanked journalists who helped promote Jazz, Ltd.) Studs Terkel referred to Ruth as "the most colorful character I know in Chicago."

Ruth was considered an honorable individual. Ruth spoke highly of her husband, Bill. Ruth was generous with her compliments and often lauded her husband Bill. Ruth was proud of Bill's accomplishments and frequently boasted to reporters that "outside of Nick’s in New York…he is the only jazz musician in the country who has owned his own place since 1940." She charmed local journalist and friends and as a result they consistently wrote positive reviews and news articles about Jazz, Ltd. Ruth was grateful for the people who helped make Ruth's and Bill's jazz club a success. Ruth was consistent in responding back to journalists and often thanked them for their articles on Jazz, Ltd.

Ruth frequently laughed self-mockingly at her own sarcasm. "It’s an advantage to be tone-deaf if you spend eight hours a night, six nights a week in a Dixieland jazz club." "[Ruth] has no musical talent and couldn’t care less." The music that enthralls Jazz, Ltd. customers "could be so many pile drivers as far as I’m concerned."

She steadfastly held to her convictions and was always optimistic. Ruth had always known that she had to work hard for everything she wanted. She had an incessant desire for money. "Everything I ever did, I did for dough. I learned quick that nobody was going to give me anything." As emcee of a new night club, Ruth entertained with wit and some risque without superlatives, as is historically common with emcees. In reference to taking criticism while upholding a no foolishness policy at Jazz, Ltd., Ruth said her "shell is thick." She often took in stride criticism for the way she managed Jazz, Ltd.

She was an astute businesswoman. Always keen to know the competition to Jazz, Ltd., Ruth kept close track of which jazz nightclubs opened and closed in Chicago, frequently mentioning in the press how many of them that Jazz, Ltd. had outlasted. "We run the business very tightly; we’ve always had a little money in the bank for that bad time. You don’t buy airplanes. You don’t go to Europe on trips…you stick with it." She was awarded $35,000 when she divorced Gus Basco in 1936. When Sidney Bechet played for a Chicago competitor to Jazz, Ltd and broke his Jazz, Ltd. contract, Ruth won a $5,000 breach of contract award against him and Sidney never played in Chicago again. In 1929 she got financial backing from banks in New York to produce her own show in Japan, which had never before been done by a chorus girl.

== Retirement and death ==
When Jazz, Ltd. permanently closed in 1972, Bill continued doing stints with his band in Chicago. He and Ruth retired to San Diego in 1978. Ruth died from complications of chronic obstructive pulmonary disease on December 9, 1992, three days before her 88th birthday. Her cremains were given to her husband, who had her ashes scattered over Long Island, New York.

== Notes and references ==
Notes

== Bibliography ==
- Abourizk, Michael (2016). "Ruth Sato, performer".
- anon(1) (April 26, 1923). "Binghamton Tonight Friday and Saturday (advertisement)". Binghamton Press. Binghamton, New York. p. 17.
- anon(2) (1955). Dixieland by Request at Jazz, Ltd (Liner notes). Jazz, Ltd band. Jazz, Ltd.
- anon(3) (September 1, 1959). "One Woman's World". Las Vegas Daily Optic. Las Vegas, Nevada: UPI. p. 3.
- anon(4) (March 17, 1926). "Cabaret Bills". Variety: 15.
- anon(5) (April 28, 1929). "Hold Everything for Japan". Brooklyn Daily Eagle. New York. p. 4.
- anon(6) (June 3, 1929). "Adapts Jazz Show for Tokyo". Fairbanks Daily News Miner. Fairbanks, Alaska. p. 8.
- anon(7) (August 6, 1929). "Makes other laxatives out of date". Centralia Evening Sentinel. p. 3.
- anon(8) (December 15, 1939). "Eurasian Hep Cat". Down Beat. 5 (15): 1.
- anon(9) (February 20, 1931). "Sweet and Low". Brooklyn Daily Eagle. New York. p. 21.
- anon(10) (October 23, 1931). "Japanese Actress". Brooklyn Standard Union. Brooklyn, New York. p. 7.
- anon(11) (August 27, 1933). "Japanese Girl To Appear In Buffalo Show". Buffalo Courier-Express. Buffalo, New York. p. 3.
- anon(12) (May 18, 1936). "Walter Winchell on Broadway". AlbaNew York Times Union. p. 22.
- anon(13) (August 1, 1940). ""East Wind" to Be Next on Stage at Municipal Opera". Macoupin County Enquirer. Carlinville, Illinois. p. 6.
- anon(14) (April 19, 1941). "Cafe Calendar". New York Post. p. 7 col 6 ¶ 2.
- anon(15) (May 31, 1941). "Ruth Sato". New York Sun. New York. p. 13.
- anon(17) (November 3, 1931). "'Crazy Quilt's' Long Tour". Variety: 52.
- anon(18) (June 5, 1955). passenger manifest from San Francisco, California to Honolulu, Hawaii. United Airlines.
- anon(19) (n.d.). Family Group Record of Ruth Sato and William Reinhardt.
- anon(20) (April 28, 1929). ""Hold Everything" for Japan". Brooklyn Daily Eagle. p. 4E.
- anon(21) (October 20, 1934). "Night Club Notes". New York Times. p. 20.
- anon(22) (March 16, 1935). "Night Club Notes". New York Times. p. 19.
- anon(23) (September 1, 1959). "Tone Deafness Is Advantage". The Bakersfield Californian. Bakersfield, California: UPI. p. 13.
- anon(24) (October 4, 1924). ""Girls drive men crazy," says midget, sued for $50,000". Burlington Gazette. p. 9.
- anon(25) (March 22, 1924). "Keith's Royal Theatre". The Hastings Echo. Hastings, New York. p. 2.
- Blewer, Ashley (n.d.). "Alex A. Aarons and Vinton Freedly present the new musical comedy "Heads up!"". New York Public Library, Billy Rose Theatre Division, Digital Collections.
- Bruccoli, Matthew J. (1975). The O'Hara Concern: a Biography of John O'Hara. Random House. p. 120. ISBN 978-0394484464.
- Bulow, Kwi (December 9, 1992), "Death Certificate for Ruth Sato Reinhardt", County of San Diego Assessor/Recorder/County Clerk. Informational Copy in Possession of Chris Kaufmann, Arlington Heights, Illinois. (certificate number 39237016715)
- Campbell, Lillian (October 10, 1931). "She's One of a Kind". Ossining Citizen Sentinel. New York. p. 7.
- Chilton, John (1987). Sidney Bechet: The Wizard of Jazz. Boston, Massachusetts: Da Capo Press. ISBN 0306806789.
- Choice, Harriet (June 17, 1971). "Jazz By Choice; It's been 25 years for city's oldest". Chicago Tribune. Chicago, Illinois. p. 11, sec. 2.
- Choice, Harriet (February 25, 1972). "Music Americana Homeless". Chicago Tribune. p. Sec. 2, p. 11.
- Crewe, Regina (April 21, 1935). "Irene Dunne Leaves Broadway Forlorn After an Exciting Visit". Syracuse, New York. p. 6.
- DeLuca(1), Brian K. (November 2002). "Box 1, Series 1: Correspondence, 1935-1976, Subseries 3: Other Correspondence, 1935-1975, The Matthew Bruccoli Research Collection of John O'Hara" (telegram from John O’hara to Ruth Sato at Casino De Paree New York 1/13/35). Special Collections and Research Archives of Kent State University.
- DeLuca(2), Brian K. (November 2002). "Box 1, Series 1: Correspondence, 1935-1976, Subseries 3: Other Correspondence, 1935-1975, The Matthew Bruccoli Research Collection of John O'Hara" (telegram from John O’hara to Ruth Sato at Casino De Paree, New York 1/23/35). Special Collections and Research Archives of Kent State University.
- Frazier, George (1971). "Jazz Historians Claim Real Jazz Came Up Mississippi".
- Frazier, George (1951). Dixieland at Jazz, Ltd (Liner notes). Jazz, Ltd band. Atlantic Records.
- Frazier, George (1952). A Tribute to Jazz Ltd (Liner notes). Jazz, Ltd band. Jazz Ltd.
- Gardner, Hy (March 4, 1938). "Broadway Newsreel". Brooklyn Daily Eagle. Brooklyn, New York. p. 21.
- Greene, Doc (February 9, 1965). "Soaking Up Some Chicago Jazz". The Detroit News. Detroit, Michigan. p. 14D.
- Hall, Jordan (June 9, 1935). "Japanese Chorus Dancer Becomes a Solo Dancer". Daily Boston Globe. p. 51.
- Hauser, Karen (n.d.). "Internet Broadway Database". New York, New York: The Broadway League.
- Hodes, Art; Hansen, Chadwick (1992). Hot Man -- The Life of Art Hodes. Champaign, Illinois: University of Illinois Press. pp. 96–98. ISBN 0252017536.
- Hurst, Sam X. (August 7, 1940). "Chatter, St. Louis". Variety: 45.
- Johnson, Malcom (November 7, 1939). "Café Life in New York—Hired Show Makers". The New York Sun. New York. p. 11.
- Johnson, Malcolm (January 9, 1941). "Reporting on the Changes at the New Waikiki Club". New York Sun. New York. pp. 14–15.
- Jones, Wayne (1994). Jazz Ltd vol 1 (Liner notes). Jazz, Ltd band. Delmark Records.
- Kirk, Vincent (March 15, 1934). "Buys Casino". Brooklyn-Daily Eagle. Brooklyn, New York. p. A.
- Koester, Bob (2001). "Bill Reinhardt and Jazz, Ltd". rhythm & news. Delmark Records.
- Kupcinet, Irv (November 17, 1967). "Kup's Column". Chicago Sun-Times. Sun-Times Media Group. p. 70.
- Leonard, William (1949). The Jazz Ltd. Album (Liner notes). Jazz, Ltd band. Jazz Ltd.
- Lesner, Sam (June 11, 1971). "Dixieland lives, thanks to Jazz, Ltd". Chicago Daily News. Chicago, Illinois: Meggy & Co.
- Lester, Barnett B. (October 22, 1936). "Miss Japan Belittles Importance Of Beauty Among Modern Women". The Evening Independent. Massillon, Ohio. p. 18.
- MacKinnon, George (December 1939). "George C. MacKinnon's Proclamations". Swing, the Guide to Modern Music: 13.
- McNeil, Aloha (January 26, 2016). "Phone Interview with Chris Kaufmann". Chicago, Illinois.
- Fulbright, Freeman (October 11, 1950). "Jazz Limited To Dixieland, Intimate Chicago Winery Gives Beat to Revival in Old Stronghold". The Daily Independent. Kannapolis North Carolina: 5.
- Reinhardt, Bill; Reinhardt, Ruth (June 5, 2009). Jazz Ltd Vol. 1 (CD). Chicago: Delmark Records. ASIN B000004BEG.
- Reinhardt, Ruth Sato (April 21, 1948). "Jazz Ltd. Owner Tells Tavern's Tale". Down Beat. 15 (8): 17.
- Reinhardt, Ruth Sato (March 1993). "Obituaries". Jazz Journal International. 46 (3): 18.
- Reinhardt, Ruth (1957). "Jazz, Ltd. wishes to thank". Jazz, LTD. Flyer.
- Roe, Dorothy (August 5, 1934). "Billy Rose Stages New Show toDisperse Those Heat Wave Blues". Syracuse American. Syracuse, New York. p. 5.
- Rotzoll, Brenda Warner (February 18, 2001). "OBITUARY: Bill Reinhardt - owned Jazz Ltd. club on Grand". Chicago Sun-Times. Chicago, Illinois: The Tribune CompaNew York. p. 71.
- Sato, Ruth (May 1941). "Could Be". Swing, the Guide to Modern Music: 16.
- Sato, Masazo (1910). 13th Census of the U.S.: 1910, Dept of Commerce and Labor, Bureau of the Census. Vol. Enumeration District 1184, line 92. New York, Queens: U.S. Government Printing Office. p. 12B.
- Sato, Ruth (1940). 16th Census of the U.S.: 1940, Dept of Commerce and Labor, Bureau of the Census. Vol. Enumeration District 1184, line 92, dwelling number 175, Line 67. New York, Manhattan Borough: U.S. Government Printing Office. p. 10B.
- Sato, Ruth (June 2, 1935). "I Was a Chorus Girl". Boston Sunday Post. Boston, Massachusetts. p. A-7.
- Satow, Masazo (1920). 14th Census of the U.S.: 1920, Dept of Commerce and Labor, Bureau of the Census. Vol. Enumeration District 1243, line 85. New York: United States Government Printing Office. p. 8B.
- Saunders, Hortense (May 11, 1929). "Orient Will See Native Cuties In Broadway Show". Canton Daily News. Canton, Ohio. p. 6.
- Schultz, Margie (1994). Eleanor Powell: A Bio-Bibliography. Greenwood Press. pp. 7, 67–69.
- Simon, A. L. (November 8, 1939). "Twisting the Dials--Chatter". The Clyde Herald. Wayne County, New York. p. 4.
- Smith, Frederick A. (minister) (June 6, 1942), Certificate of Marriage, William Theodore Reinhardt to Ruth Satow, Norfolk, Virginia: vive
- Stevenson, L.L. (May 10, 1941). "Lights of New York". Evening Recorder. p. 4 col. 5 ¶ 1.
- Terkel, Studs; Reinhardt, Ruth (March 15, 1964). "Studs Terkel Program". Interview with Ruth Sato Reinhardt. Season 12. Chicago: Chicago History Museum. 50 minutes in. WFMT.
- Tinder, Clifford (n.d.). "Playbill Vault: Ruth Sato". New York, New York: Playbill Incorporated.
- Tinder, Clifford (April 12, 1926). "Playbill Vault: Song of the Flame". New York, New York: Playbill Incorporated.
- Wheeler, Keith (June 2, 1950). "Can't Outrun Loneliness". Chicago Sun-Times. Chicago. p. 38.
- Williams, Jack (February 14, 2001). "OBITUARIES Bill Reinhardt, 94; jazz musician, club owner". San Diego Union. San Diego.
- Winchell, Walter (December 26, 1934). "On Broadway". Syracuse Journal. Syracuse, New York. p. 11.
- Winchell, Walter (May 20, 1939). "Walter Winchell on Broadway". The Burlington Daily Times. Burlington, North Carolina. p. 4.
- Winchell, Walter (January 11, 1948). "Walter Winchell – Broadway and Elsewhere". AlbaNew York Times Union. p. 4.
- Winchell(2), Walter (November 10, 1939). "Walter Winchell On Broadway". The Binghamton Press. p. 25.
