= Volly De Faut =

American jazz musician

Voltaire "Volly" De Faut (March 14, 1904 – May 29, 1973) was an American jazz reed player.

De Faut was born in Little Rock, Arkansas, United States, but his family moved to Chicago when he was six. He played with Sig Meyers in the early 1920s and then spent time in the New Orleans Rhythm Kings before joining Art Kassel. His first recordings were made with Muggsy Spanier in 1924; he recorded with Jelly Roll Morton the following year. Later in the 1920s he played with Merritt Brunies and Jean Goldkette, and played for a time in Detroit. During the early 1920s, he also played with The Bucktown Five.

Around the end of the decade De Faut held several positions in theater orchestras in Chicago, and also worked as a studio musician. He started his own dog breeding business but abandoned it to join the military and play in bands there. He returned to Chicago in the middle of the 1940s, playing with Bud Jacobson and working extensively on the local jazz scene. In the 1950s he moved to Davenport, Iowa, then returned to Chicago in 1965. In the last two decades of his life De Faut worked often with Art Hodes, including on many of his recordings for Delmark Records.
