= The Bucktown Five =

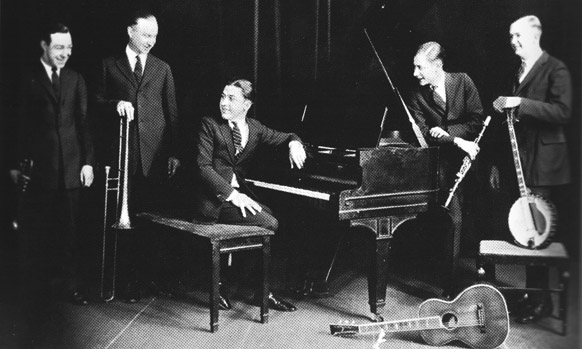
The Bucktown Five

The Bucktown Five was a jazz group active in the early 1920s in the Chicago area of the United States. The group played a New Orleans style of collective improvisational jazz and were forerunners of the Chicago style which developed in later years. About eighteen months after breaking up, many of the same players recorded in Chicago as the Stomp Six.

The band's name is linked with New Orleans, as Bucktown is a Chicago neighborhood, but also the name of the settlement that grew up on the shore of Lake Pontchartrain after the close of Storyville. It became a smaller version of that district.

== Members ==
- Guy Carey - trombone
- Volly De Faut - clarinet, alto saxophone
- Marvin Saxbe - banjo, guitar, cymbal
- Bill Shelby - banjo
- Muggsy Spanier - cornet
- Mel Stitzel - piano

== Discography ==
The group recorded on Claxtonola Records and other labels. Recordings include:

- The Bucktown Five - Chicago Blues, 1924
- The Bucktown Five - Hot Mittens, 1924
- The Bucktown Five - Mobile Blues, 1924
- The Bucktown Five - Really A Pain, 1924
- The Bucktown Five - Buddy's Habits, 1924
- The Bucktown Five - Chicago Blues, 1924
- The Bucktown Five - Someday Sweetheart, 1924
- The Bucktown Five - Steady Roll Blues, 1924
