= Bloomington Symphony Orchestra (Minnesota) =

- Origin: Bloomington, Minnesota, United States
- Genre: Classical
- Occupation: Symphony Orchestra
- Years active: 1963-present
- Members: Manny Laureano, Music Director; Brianna Butler, President; Michael Sutton, Concertmaster; Sara Tan, General Manager
- Website: http://bloomingtonsymphony.org/

The Bloomington Symphony Orchestra (BSO) was founded in 1963 by the City of Bloomington, Minnesota, United States. The orchestra was created to provide Bloomington's citizens with classical orchestral music and to create an outlet where area instrumentalists could develop their musical abilities.

The founders of the orchestra were Gene Kelly, City of Bloomington's parks and recreation director, and renowned jazz musician Paul W. Doc Evans, who served as music director until 1977. Directors since then have included Steven Amundson of St. Olaf College; William LaRue Jones of the Greater Twin Cities Youth Symphonies, and the University of Iowa; Akira Mori of the University of Minnesota; Joseph Schlefke; and current music director, Manny Laureano.

The orchestra is made up of nonprofessional and freelance professional musicians who are selected by competitive audition. The orchestra presents four to five classical programs each season, featuring instrumental soloists, which includes students, area college/university faculty and members of the Minnesota Orchestra and St. Paul Chamber Orchestra.

The BSO performs an annual summer concert at the Lake Normandale Bandshell, as part of Bloomington's "SummerFete" or its "Arts in the Park" series, featuring motion picture scores, show tunes, and light classical music.

The orchestra collaborates extensively with other Bloomington-area arts groups. Choral collaborations with Angelica Cantanti (Bloomington's children's choir), the Normandale Choral Society and others have involved major works including: Orff's Carmina Burana, Honegger's King David Oratorio, Brahms's A German Requiem, Holst's The Planets, Shostakovich's Songs of the Forest, Duruflé's Requiem, and Mahler's Symphony#2 "Resurrection". Bloomington Kennedy High School's women's choir "Viva Voce" has joined with the BSO to perform Debussy's Nocturnes. Bloomington's Continental Ballet Company collaborated with the BSO on a fully staged production of Tchaikovsky's The Nutcracker. Chamber ensembles made up of players from the orchestra also play music for Bloomington events and organizations.

Outreach efforts are ongoing in other Minnesota suburbs and rural communities in an effort to expose residents to high-quality classical music.

The BSO is funded by corporate and private donors, fundraisers, dues from member-musicians, and an arts grant from the City of Bloomington. The BSO is a Minnesota nonprofit corporation with the Section 501(C)(3) designation from the Internal Revenue Service (IRS).

The orchestra is administered by a board of directors that includes both musician members and community members. The BSO is currently led by president Brianna Butler, music director and conductor Manny Laureano, concertmaster Michael Sutton, general manager Sara Tan, and its board of directors.
