= Audiophile Records =

American record company and label

- Parent company: George H. Buck Jr. Jazz Foundation
- Founded: 1947
- Founder: Ewing D. Nunn
- Genre: Jazz
- Country of origin: U.S.
- Location: New Orleans, Louisiana
- Official website: jazzology.com

Audiophile Records is a record company and label founded in 1947 by Ewing Dunbar Nunn to produce recordings of Dixieland jazz. A very few of the early pressings were classical music, Robert Noehren on pipe organ, AP-2 and AP-9 for example.

== History ==
Having been a record collector since the 1920s, Nunn began to make records to improve their audio quality. He was a recording engineer who believed monophonic sound (mono) was better than stereophonic sound (stereo). His records impressed High Fidelity magazine and G. A. Briggs, the designer of Wharfedale speakers. In 1947, he started Audiophile Records in Saukville, Wisconsin before moving it to Mequon, Wisconsin in 1965.

In 1969 Nunn sold the label to Jim Cullum of San Antonio, Texas, and his son, Jim Cullum, Jr., who owned Happy Jazz Records. Nunn remained as chief engineer. The Cullums were both musicians. With the father on clarinet and the son on cornet, they played in the Happy Jazz Band which was popular along the San Antonio River Walk and which recorded on Audiophile.

In the 1970s, Audiophile was acquired by George Buck's Jazzology group, now under control of the George H. Buck Jr. Jazz Foundation.

== Making records ==
Audiophile's albums were pressed by the Wakefield company in Phoenix, Arizona on transparent red vinyl, similar to the red vinyl used by RCA for many of its early microgroove releases. Its early albums were released on 78, which was thought to offer greater fidelity. Nunn is best known for his high-fidelity, monophonic 78 recordings. As recording technology improved, he produced 33 1/3 LPs and eventually stereo.

In the late 1940s Audiophile released its first recording, Pop Goes the Weasel (AP 1) by Harry Blons. The Audiophile AP 1 disk side A has three tracks: "Pop Goes the Weasel", "Wolverine Blues", and "Chimes Blues". The B side has "Lassus Trombone", "Tia Juana", and "Copenhagen". All six numbers are played by the Harry Blons Dixieland Band. This disk carries the matrix and label number 103 and 104. The Audiophile AP 2 disk side A has four tracks: "Caillon De Westminster", "Legende", "Scherzetto" and "Divertissement". The B side has three tracks: "Chorale Prefudes - Reger", "Pastorale - Reger" and "Prelude and Fugue on Bach - Liszt" All seven numbers are played by Robert Noehren, organist. This disk carries the matrix and label numbers 101 and 102. These labels showing the AP 1 disk with matrix 103 and 104 and the AP 2 disk with matrix 101 and 102 leaves open the question of which was the first of these rare Audiophile 78's pressed.

The earliest of these releases (many pressed at 78 rpm), AP-1 through at least AP-29, came in a heavy manilla envelope. The first few, AP-1 through AP-5 are rare and highly prized among collectors. Around 1952 or 1953, Nunn switched exclusively to 33 1/3 rpm releases and began using the more standard cardboard sleeve with a color slick on the cover.

== Notable artists ==
- Claire Austin
- Harry Blons
- Joyce Breach
- Joe Bushkin
- Joyce Carr
- Barbara Carroll
- Russ Case Orchestra
- Melissa Collard
- Eddie Condon
- Dolly Dawn
- Dorothy Donegan
- George Duvivier
- Doc Evans
- Helen Forrest
- Connie Francis
- Bud Freeman
- Urbie Green
- Juanita Hall
- Dick Haymes
- Art Hodes
- Dick Hyman
- Max Kaminsky
- Rebecca Kilgore
- Barbara Lea
- Loonis McGlohon
- Mabel Mercer
- Johnny Mince
- Buddy Morrow
- Rose Murphy
- Robert Noehren
- Helen O'Connell
- Anita O'Day
- Patti Page
- Knocky Parker
- Les Paul
- Bucky Pizzarelli
- Bertice Reading
- Jimmy Rowles
- Pee Wee Russell
- Artie Shapiro
- Daryl Sherman
- Carrie Smith
- Maxine Sullivan
- Mel Tormé
- Ukulele Ike
- Marlene VerPlanck
- Ronnie Whyte
- Lee Wiley
- Paul Weston
- George Wettling
- Margaret Whiting
