= Herb Hall (musician) =

American jazz clarinetist and saxophonist (1907–1996)

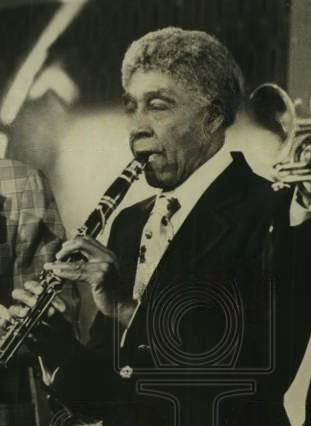
- Hall in 1977

Background information
- Born: Herbert Hall; March 28, 1907; Reserve, Louisiana, U.S.
- Died: March 5, 1996 (aged 88) San Antonio, Texas, U.S.
- Genre: Jazz
- Instruments: Clarinet, alto saxophone

Herbert L. Hall (March 28, 1907 – March 5, 1996) was an American jazz clarinetist and alto saxophonist.

== Early life ==
Hall was born in Reserve, Louisiana, the brother of Edmond Hall and the son of clarinetist Edward Hall.

== Career ==
Hall began on banjo with the Niles Jazz Band (1923–1925), then settled on reeds. In 1926, he played with Kid Augustin Victor in Baton Rouge, and moved to New Orleans the following year. He played briefly with Sidney Desvigne, then played for over a decade with Don Albert (1929–1940), moving to San Antonio with him and remaining there until 1945.

After this he moved to Philadelphia, where he played with Herman Autrey; a few years later he was in New York, working with Doc Cheatham (1955) and toured Europe with Sammy Price (1955–56). He often played in New York jazz clubs, particularly Jimmy Ryan's and Eddie Condon's, in the late 1950s and 1960s. In 1968-69, he toured with Wild Bill Davison's Jazz Giants, and then a stint with an offshoot band of The Jazz Giants, called "Buzzy's Jazz Family" which included Herman Autrey, Benny Morton, Sonny Drootin, Eddie Gibbs and leader Buzzy Drootin on drums. He worked with Don Ewell in the 1970s. He also appeared in Bob Greene's Jelly Roll Morton revue show that decade.

== Personal life ==
Hall lived in Boerne, Texas.

== Discography ==
- Old Tyme Modern (Sackville, 1969)
- Clarinet Duets with Albert Nicholas (GHB, 1969)
- John - Doc & Herb with Fessor's Nighthawks (Storyville, 1979)
