= Claire Austin =

American blues/jazz singer and pianist (1918–1994)

- Born: Augusta Marie; November 21, 1918; Yakima, Washington, U.S.
- Died: June 17, 1994 (aged 75) Willits, California, U.S.
- Genre: Jazz
- Occupation: Singer

Claire Austin (November 21, 1918 – June 19, 1994) (born Augusta Marie) was an American blues and jazz singer and pianist.

Austin was born to Swedish-American parents in Yakima, Washington. She played in nightclubs throughout the northwest in the 1930s and toured with the Chuck Austin Band in the 1940s. She retired from professional singing by the early 1950s and was working as an accountant in Sacramento for the state of California; after singing with Turk Murphy, she frequently performed in San Francisco for two years. She remained active through the 1970s. Her singing style has been compared to Peggy Lee.

== Discography ==
- Sings the Blues With Kid Ory (Good Time Jazz, 1954)
- When Your Lover Has Gone (Contemporary, 1956)
- Claire Austin and the Great Excelsior Jazz Band (GHB, 1966)
- Goin' Crazy with the Blues with Gene Mayl (Jazzology, 1975)
- Memories of You with Don Ewell (Audiophile, 1993)
