= Johnny Wiggs =

American jazz musician and band leader (1899–1977)

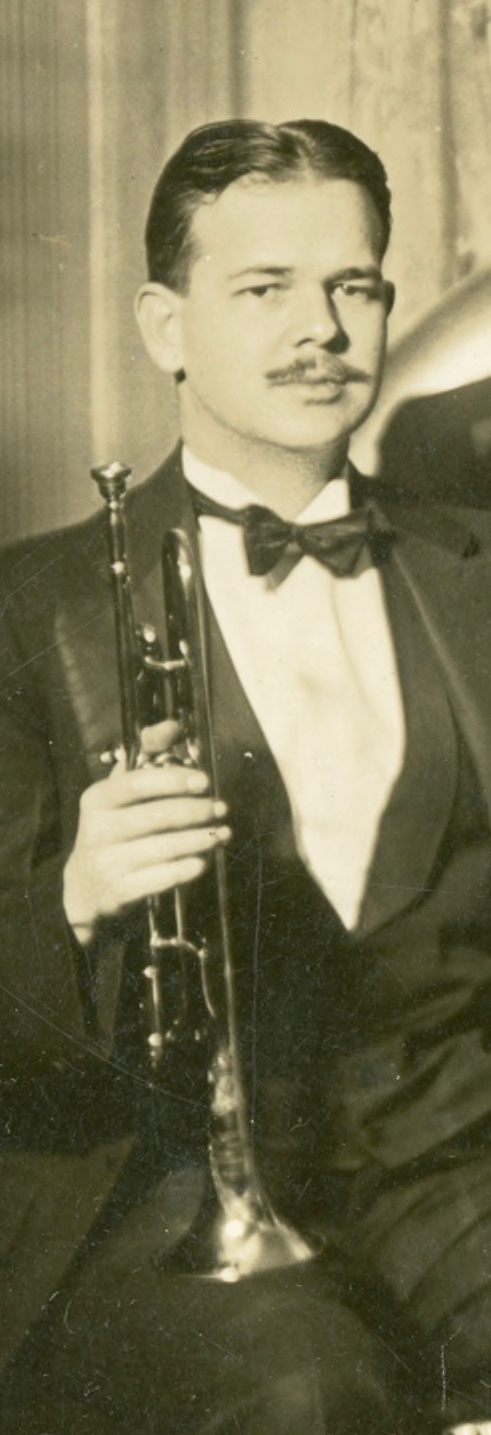
Wiggs c 1926

Johnny Wiggs (born John Wigginton Hyman, July 25, 1899 – October 10, 1977) was an American jazz musician and band leader.

Born in New Orleans, Louisiana, United States, Wiggs started his music career on the violin. He soon adopted the cornet and moved to New York City before returning to New Orleans. His main stylistic influences were Bix Beiderbecke and King Oliver, who Wiggs insisted did his best work in New Orleans in the years before he moved up North and was recorded.

In the late 1920s he took a job as a teacher in Louisiana and at night played in New Orleans jazz clubs. He made his first recordings as "John Hyman's Bayou Stompers" in the late 1920s.

In the 1940s he again became a full-time musician, leading several bands and recording many songs. He used the pseudonym "Johnny Wiggs", as jazz was still looked down on in some circles. He became an important figure in the local traditional jazz revival. In the 1960s he performed part-time, though he remained active until the 1970s. He was a mentor to George Finola. Pete Fountain was one of his more famous pupils. He helped found the New Orleans Jazz Club and was a force behind the jazz revival in the 1940s.
