= Bill Reinhardt =

American jazz clarinetist and bandleader (1908–2001)

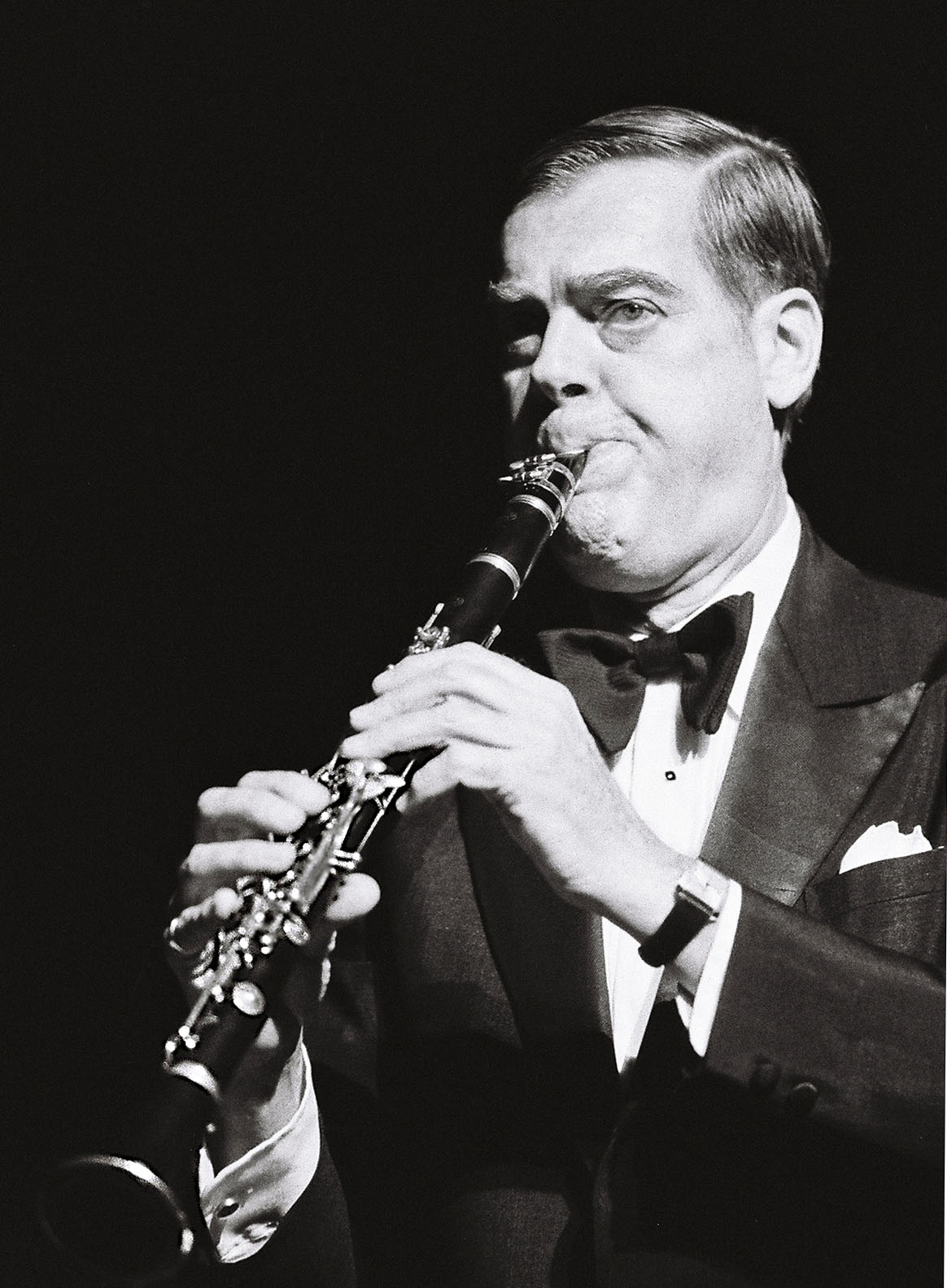
- Bill Reinhardt at Flaming Sally's 1977
- Born: William Julius Theodore Reinhardt; September 21, 1908; Chicago, Illinois, United States
- Died: January 23, 2001 (aged 92); San Diego, California, United States
- Resting place: Graceland Cemetery
- Spouse(s): Ruth Sato (June, 1942 – December, 1992; her death); Patricia Hughes (m. Sep. 23, 1994)
- Musical career
- Genre: Dixieland
- Occupations: Musician, bandleader, nightclub owner and manager, insurance salesman
- Instruments: Clarinet, Tenor Saxophone, French horn
- Years active: 1926-1981
- Labels: Jazz, Ltd.; Atlantic
- Formerly of: Chicago Six

William Julius Theodore Reinhardt (September 21, 1908 – January 23, 2001) was an American clarinetist, bandleader and the owner of Jazz, Ltd.—the first Jazz club run by a musician in Chicago and one of the longest running Dixieland jazz clubs in the country. He also played tenor saxophone, French horn and sang. Unlike many of the famous jazz musicians that Bill employed in his band, he did not seek fame; he was content with the great success of his nightclub. However, by the 1960s his band did appear on two TV programs.

== Family ==
Bill was born on West Garfield Ave. on the south side of Chicago to William C. Reinhardt (a bartender and real estate salesman) and Viola Reinhardt, both of German descent. Bill Reinhardt had a younger sister, Virginia (Ginny) Reinhardt, born 1912. She married Chet Roble, a TV actor, musician and one time member of Bill Reinhardt's band.

== Early career ==
Bill learned jazz music first by studying it from age nine to 18 then by traveling extensively with various bands for 16 years until joining the Navy in 1942. He heard and met many famous musicians and attended many popular nightclubs. This provided him with the contacts and resources he needed to form his own band and establish his own nightclub. In the 1920s Joe Marsala inspired Bill to play clarinet as his main instrument.

He played the French horn while attending Lake View High School in Chicago. On weekend nights he followed Johnny Dodds at Kelly's Stables and Jimmy Noone at the El Rado Cafe (231 E. 55th Street in the Garfield Hotel) on the south side. He attended the University of Illinois for a year. There he met Miles Rinker, brother of a member of Paul Whiteman's The Rhythm Boys. Miles got Bill into the college concert band, Louis Schwab and his Illini Orioles under bandmaster Austin Harding.

=== First road tour and nightclub ===
During summer vacation, Louis contacted King Richards and Bill took his first road trip to Wisconsin and Indiana. Fred Dexter, a music scout and musician at the Wisconsin Roof Gardens club, heard Bill play and hired him for his band. He played at a resort pavilion in Hudson Lake, Indiana. Bill was impressed with Dexter's fast band, whose musicians went on to good things. Dale McMickle, the trumpet player, was first trumpet with Glenn Miller. Alex Palocsay, the trombone player, was with Fred Waring. Bob White, the drummer, was with Freddy Martin for about twelve years. Fred Dexter's band went on the road to Wisconsin, Illinois, and then Buffalo, New York, to play a Christmas season at a ballroom. Bill Reinhardt was "flabbergasted" upon seeing the inside of his first nightclub: The Everglades with show girls, at 48th and Broadway streets in New York City early in 1928. Walter Winchell and many celebrities frequented the club. Benny Goodman heard Dexter's band play.

=== Introduction to jazz ===
He was introduced to jazz while living in an apartment building at 130 West 47th Street and he heard Jack Teagarden for the first time. He also heard his first McKenzie-Condons and Bix Beiderbecke records. Cass Hagan bought the band from Fred Dexter and Bill toured with them on college dates which included the Pelham Heath Inn in New York; it was run by the mob. The band broke up in the fall of 1928 and Bill stopped playing the French horn. He then went on a New England vaudeville tour with Freddie Rich. Bill then worked for Paul Specht at a club on Broadway.

Upon returning to Chicago, he worked for Sol Wagner at The Frolics (18 East 22nd Street) from the spring of 1929 until the stock market crashed in the fall. About this time Bill did a recording in an old Brunswick studio on South Wabash Avenue with Wingy Manone on trumpet, Jack Gardner on piano and Floyd Hinkley on saxophone. He then played at a chop suey house near Evanston with Floyd Hinkley and Art Hodes playing piano.

=== Roadhouses and band management ===
In about 1931 Bill worked at The Farm roadhouse in Valhalla, New York. He worked with Theo Kuriss, Ernie Harris, Sol Pace, Bob Cusumano and Harlow Atwood. In the summer or fall of 1932 Bill worked with Bill Whelpley's band at The Log Cabin roadhouse in Armonk, New York. The band members were: Bill Whelpley, George Blum, Ernie Harris, Bill King, Chubby Landis, Stewie Anderson and Harlow Atwood. In 1934 Bill played Alto Sax for Benny Goodman.

By 1935 Bill worked as a favor for a friend at "The Village Grove Nut Club" with Frank Orchard and at the "Westchester Biltmore Country Club", where he had a dance band.

While in New Rochelle in 1939, Bill collaborated with the owners of The Ship Ahoy and assembled a small jazz band that people enjoyed. Johnny Strouse played drums and Tabby Haverfield played piano. One day a photographer, Emery Clarke, stopped in and asked to take a few pictures of Bill playing different instruments for the Saturday Evening Post. Bill obliged and was featured on the cover of the April 15, 1939 issue.

Bill traveled again, this time to Florida, to play Albert Bouchè's Villa Venice nightclub, and while performing there Bill met burlesque dancer, Sally Rand. They formed a serious relationship but drummer Danny Alvin talked the two out of marriage. In 1930 Sally encouraged Bill to travel to New York when he had already considered training under renowned sax teacher, Merle Johnston, who was based there.

== Inspiration for Jazz, Ltd. ==
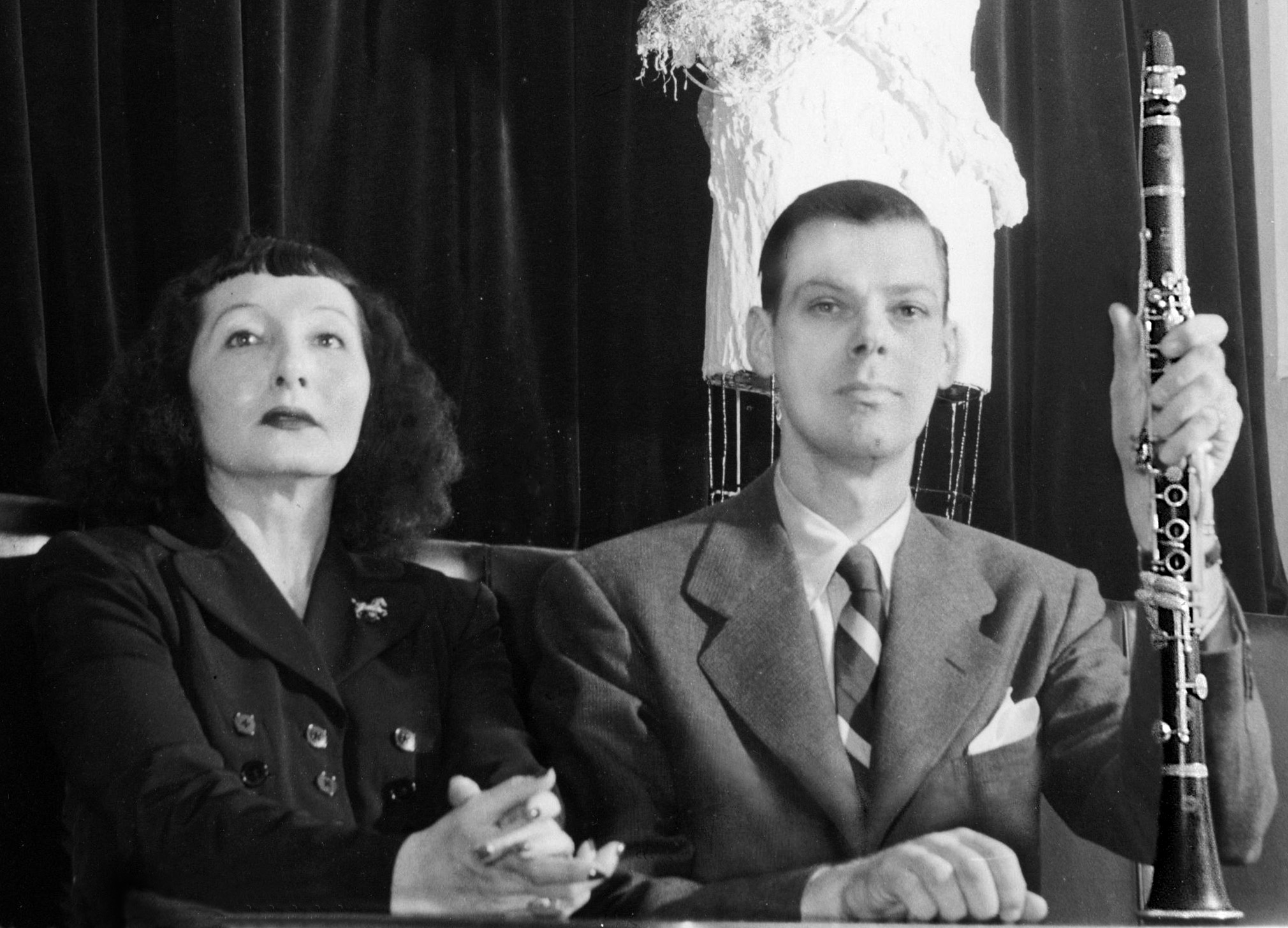
Bill and Ruth, Jazz, Ltd., 1947

From 1939 to 1940 Bill consulted Nick Rongetti in afternoons to learn how to operate a nightclub. Bill did Monday night sessions at Nick's nightclub in New York City for about two months. The band members were: George Stacey, trumpet (brother of altoist, Jack Stacey, with Jimmy Dorsey), Frank Orchard, trombone; Gene Schroeder, piano; Danny Alvin, drums. In 1941 Bill played at the Crystal Café (Brooklyn) and Club 18 (52nd St. New York City).

In the early 1940s Bill played with Frank Orchard, Bobby Hackett, Max Kaminsky, Wingy Manone and Joe Marsala. Bill met his future wife, Ruth Sato, at the Forbidden City oriental nightclub on 58th Street in New York when they both were performing there. They married in June 1942. Bill enlisted in the Navy in Norfolk, Virginia (May 1942), doing boot training with the Ninth Seabee battalion and was discharged in Sep., 1945.

== Jazz, Ltd. ==
For the next 20 months Bill and Ruth planned and organized Jazz, Ltd., a nightclub at 11 East Grand Avenue in Chicago to play solely Dixieland music. Bill was the first musician to own a nightclub in Chicago. It was well known for featuring some of the best jazz musicians in the country: Sidney Bechet, Edmond Hall, George Brunies, Muggsy Spanier, Baby Dodds, Jack Teagarden, Art Hodes, Barrett Deems, and Les Beigel. Bill based the format of the club on Nick's in New York. His club was rare in keeping out the mob. He invested his own money in Jazz, Ltd. and was co-owner, bandleader and played clarinet and saxophone. Ruth was the other co-owner, managed the club and did promotions. It was highly successful, operating from 1947 to 1972. Jazz, Ltd. occasionally played concerts outside the club for charitable benefits and to sponsor the opening of other venues.

== Managing the Jazz, Ltd. band ==
Ruth said of her husband in an interview: Bill had a very difficult job on the bandstand. He holds the band together with the right tempo. "a square two-or four-beat to the measure for all and that's the way it's going to stay."—Bill Reinhardt Whenever another bandmember played an instrument with a reed, such as Sidney Bechet on soprano saxophone, Bill used a different reed so as not to play the same notes as Sidney. Bill is the one who recruited the musicians to Jazz, Ltd., bringing talented ones to Chicago whom Chicagoans never heard of. There's so many different schools of jazz that you don't know what to play half the time, so you play by names of songs. When Bill wasn't managing the band at night he sold insurance during the day.

== Playing style ==
"Bill Reinhardt plays a beautifully fine clarinet...and he is the one that has kept the music even and full of integrity." "Bill Reinhardt plays clarinet in a warm, dirty style, reminiscent of Teschemacher..." "Bill was somewhat rigid in his presentation and format, I liked Bill's clarinet playing, particularly his ensemble and low register work. He knew how to play in the Dixieland/counterpoint ensemble which only a few clarinetists have mastered. His tempos were usually just right as he had the correct idea that this music should he danceable." 'Reinhardt's dark and slightly acrid tone and his fluid, low-register choruses also mark him as a 'Chicago' stylist." Bill preferred the Selmer brand of clarinet (from France) and he was among the first to use a crystal mouthpiece.

== Interests and hobbies ==
Bill enjoyed fishing, swimming, hunting, following the Brooklyn Dodgers and New York Yankees baseball, listening to "The Lone Ranger" and "The Texas Rangers" on the radio, and following the stock market for fun. In the 1930s his favorite job was working at Club 18 where he liked listening to Jackie Gleason, Jack White, Frankie Hyers, and Joe Frisco.

== Personality ==
Bill was down-to-earth, mild mannered, humble and, by his own admission, vain. On one of the first fine bands he joined, he said of Fred Dexter, "Why in the world he hired me I do not know; I couldn't blow my nose." Bill had a remarkable memory for people he played with and places he played at six decades earlier, recalling the year and the circumstances he was at each engagement. He earned respect for managing so many talented musicians, especially when multiple stars were in the same band and each wanted to lead. He was passionate about Dixieland. In the face of criticism from other bandmembers, Bill insisted that Dixieland was originally intended for dancing but in Chicago other musicians got hung up on Chicago style jazz, "which as far as I'm concerned is a cop out! They just can't keep time." Bill was a persuasive negotiator. Many bandleaders were unable to convince Doc Evans to move from his home in Minneapolis to join their band but Bill was the only one who succeeded. Evans played for Jazz, Ltd. for five years. About 20% of the club's band members Bill recruited from out of state. Nothing serious phased him. Bill said nonchalantly, "I began having problems with my ticker...drastic for some people but not for me," in reference to having angioplasty for an obstructed artery and a pacemaker for arrhythmia (when he was age 79). Bill frequently read reviews of his Jazz, Ltd. records in Down Beat jazz magazine.

== After the club ==
Jazz, Ltd. band in Pioneer Court, Michigan Avenue, Chicago, July, 1972

Bill Reinhardt continued the Jazz, Ltd. band after closing the club. He remained in Chicago for the next six years. Using his publicity from the club, Bill's band played at numerous venues around Chicago until he found a long term engagement at Flaming Sally's nightclub in the Blackstone Hotel in Chicago for three years (1974-1977). He got sick and gave the Jazz, Ltd. band over to long time bandmember, Jim Beebe, who continued at the Blackstone Hotel for three more years.

== San Diego and final years ==
In May 1978 Bill and Ruth moved to San Diego for the warmer climate. Bill played the Solana Beach Friday cocktail session one day a week and then quit after a disagreement on salary.

In 1981 bassist Bob Finch recruited Bill to help start a new jazz band at the Belly-Up Tavern in Solana Beach. When Bill insisted on Chicago style jazz, Ruth Reinhardt named the band 'The Chicago Six.' The other four bandmembers were Frank Chaddick, Bob Long, Phil Andreen and John Hall. Bill stayed with the band for three months until he fell and fractured his jaw, at which point Bill said, "that was for all intents and purposes the end of my career." In 1982 the band dedicated their first album, Chicago Six Live at the Belly Up Tavern, to Bill.

In 1987 Bill had angioplasty for an obstructed artery and a pacemaker installed to treat a heart arrhythmia. He was put on a permanent strict diet and continued walking the hills of San Diego for exercise.

When his wife, Ruth, died in 1992, Bill sold the rights to the Jazz, Ltd masters to Delmark Records, run by Bob Koester, an old friend in Chicago. In the early 1990s, when Bill developed Dementia and Parkinson's disease, Harlow Atwood, a 63-year friend of Bill's, persuaded Patricia Hughes to leave her job in Arkansas and care for him. She struck up a close friendship with Bill via letters and phone conversations starting in January, 1994. He was 86 and she was 43, when "I married him to keep him out of a nursing home" Patrica said. She cared for him at home, and "he was my best friend." Bill proclaimed of Pat, "I'm just on cloud # 9 – she is a wonderful girl and far out of any expectation I might have had." By 1994 he lost the tonality of his hearing and could no longer play the clarinet.

In February 1998 Bill was mugged while jogging. He suffered a fractured pelvis and was cut with a knife, recovering by the end of the year. He died at home of cardiac arrest on Jan. 23, 2001 at the age of 92. He is interred at Graceland Cemetery in Chicago.

== Bibliography ==
- anon_1 (December 15, 1942). "How the Navy Musicians Live and Work, the Story of Typical Norfolk Gob". Down Beat. Chicago: 18.
- anon_2 (1955). Dixieland by Request at Jazz, Ltd (Liner notes). Jazz, Ltd band. Jazz, Ltd.
- Hodges, Dave (1982). Chicago Six – Live at the Belly Up Tavern (Liner notes). Jazz, Ltd band. Solana Beach, California: Fan Records.
- Alexander, Scott. "Joe "Wingy" Manone and his Club Royale Orchestra". Red Hot Jazz.
- Babikian, Gregory (January 23, 2001), "Death Certificate for William Reinhardt", County of San Diego Assessor/Recorder/County Clerk. (certificate number 3200137001177)
- Chilton1, John (1987). Sidney Bechet: The Wizard of Jazz [Google Books version]. Boston, MA: Da Capo Press. p. 229 ¶2. ISBN 0306806789.
- Coller, Derek; Whyatt, Bert (May 28, 1992). "Tape-recorded interview with Bill Reinhardt". San Diego, California.
- Coller, Derek; Whyatt, Bert (1996). "Bill Reinhardt: Jazz, Ltd. and a Little More". Storyville: 22–27.
- Coller, Derek (May 24, 2016). E-mail to Chris Kaufmann. England.
- Feather, Leonard; Gitler, Ira (1999). Biographical Encyclopedia of Jazz. New York: Oxford University Press. p. 506. ISBN 0199729077.
- Hall, John (June 20, 2016). "Chris Kaufmann phone Interview with John Hall". Encinitas, California.
- Leonard(1), William (April 13, 1951). "Tower Ticker". Chicago Tribune. Chicago, Illinois. p. 9 § 2.
- Choice, Harriet (September 19, 1969). "The Jazz Sound". Chicago Tribune. Chicago, Illinois. p. 10 § 2.
- Leonard(2), William (May 4, 1951). "Tower Ticker". The Chicago Tribune. Chicago, Illinois. p. 7 Part 3.
- Lesner, Sam (June 21, 1971). "Dixieland Lives Thanks to Jazz, Ltd" [as quoted by Bill Reinhardt]. Chicago Daily News. Chicago, Illinois.
- Peterwas, Barbara (June 7, 2016). "Chris Kaufmann phone Interview with Barbara Peterwas". Arlington Heights, Illinois.
- Reinhardt, Ruth (October 1947). "Jazz, Ltd". The Jazz Record. The John Steiner Collection, University of Chicago, Special Collections and Research Center: 14.
- Reinhardt, Ruth Sato (February 1970). "Jazz, Ltd". International Musician. New York City: American Federation of Musicians: 5, 23.
- Reinhardt_1, Bill (March 19, 1994). Bill Reinhardt letter to Derek Coller. San Diego, California.
- Reinhardt_5, Bill (May 20, 1994). Bill Reinhardt letter to Derek Coller. San Diego, California.
- Reinhardt_2, Bill (July 11, 1994). Bill Reinhardt letter to Derek Coller. San Diego, California.
- Reinhardt_3, Bill (December 1994). Bill Reinhardt letter to Derek Coller. San Diego, California.
- Reinhardt_4, Bill (July 23, 1995). Bill Reinhardt letter to Derek Coller. San Diego, California.
- Schawlow, Arthur (September 1947). "Chicago Visit". Jazz Notes, the Australian Hot Jazz Journal. 77. Australia.
- Beebe, Jim (1994). Jazz Ltd vol 1 (Liner notes). Jazz, Ltd band. Delmark Records.
- Coller, Derek (March 1, 1992). "Chet Roble Chicago Pianist". Storyville. 149. Chigwell England: Storyville Publications and Co. Ltd: 164.
- Coller, Derek (2010). "Harlow, in His Own Words". Read Periodicals.
- Gill, Henry Herr (July 14, 1972). Bill Reinhardt's Jazz Band Performs at Pioneer Court, 35mm Negative Film. Chicago.
- Green, Doc (February 9, 1965). "Soaking Up Some Chicago Jazz". The Detroit News. Detroit, MI: Jonathan Wolman. p. 14 D.
- Koester, Bob (2001). "Bill Reinhardt and Jazz, Ltd". rhythm & news. Delmark Records. Archived from the original on March 5, 2016.
- Leonard, William (1949). The Jazz Ltd. Album (Liner notes). Jazz, Ltd band. Jazz Ltd.
- Muranyi, Joe (1961). Jazz at Jazz Ltd (Liner notes). Jazz Ltd band. Atlantic Records.
- Reinhardt, Bill; Coller, Derek; Whyatt, Bert (June 1, 1993). "Bill Reinhardt: Jazz Ltd - And More". Storyville. 154. Chigwell England: Storyville Publications and Co. Ltd: 136–147.
- Reinhardt, Bill; Reinhardt, Ruth (June 5, 2009). Jazz Ltd Vol. 1 (CD). Chicago: Delmark Records. ASIN B000004BEG.
- Reinhardt, Ruth Sato (April 21, 1948). "Jazz Ltd. Owner Tells Tavern's Tale". Down Beat. 15 (8): 17.
- Reinhardt, Ruth (1955). Jazz Ltd. advertisement album card insert (Jazz Ltd Volume 3: Dixieland by Request). Chicago, IL: Jazz, Ltd.
- Rotzoll, Brenda Warner (February 18, 2001). "OBITUARY: Bill Reinhardt - owned Jazz Ltd. club on Grand". Chicago Sun-Times. Chicago, IL: The Tribune Company. p. 71.
- Terkel, Studs; Reinhardt, Ruth (March 15, 1964). "Interview with Ruth Reinhardt". Studs Terkel Program. Chicago. 51 minutes in. WFMT.
- U.S. Census Bureau (1910). U.S. Census Record. Chicago, IL: U.S. Census Bureau.
- Williams, Jack (February 14, 2001). "OBITUARIES Bill Reinhardt, 94; jazz musician, club owner". San Diego Union. San Diego.
- Wiedrich, Robert (March 8, 1970). "Tower Ticker". Chicago Tribune. Chicago Tribune Archives. p. 2b, ¶2 §1.
