= Doc Evans =

American jazz cornetist (1907–1977)

- Born: Paul Wesley Evans; June 20, 1907; Spring Valley, Minnesota, U.S.
- Died: January 10, 1977 (aged 69)
- Genres: Jazz; Dixieland jazz; classical
- Occupation: Musician
- Instrument: Cornet
- Years active: 1920s–1975
- Labels: Disc; Joco; Soma; Audiophile
- Formerly of: Jazz, Ltd.; Bloomington Symphony Orchestra
- Education: Carleton College (BA)

Paul Wesley "Doc" Evans (June 20, 1907 – January 10, 1977) was an American jazz cornetist.

== Biography ==
Evans was born on June 20, 1907, in Spring Valley, Minnesota, the son of a Methodist minister. He learned piano and drums as a child and played the saxophone in high school. Graduating from Carleton College with a Bachelor of Arts in English, he also played with the Carleton Collegians dance band there. He gave up the saxophone in the late 1920s for cornet and played Dixieland jazz regularly in Minneapolis at that time.

Evans continued to play through the Great Depression, turning down offers to play outside of the Midwest. In 1947, he led the band that played for the opening of Chicago's Jazz, Ltd. club upon being persuaded by the clarinetist Bill Reinhardt. He worked in Chicago until 1952 and then embarked on nationwide tours, recording frequently along the way. Evans recorded as a leader for Disc Records, in 1947, and for Joco Records, based in Northfield, Minnesota, in 1949–50. In August 1953, he gave a series of concerts at the Walker Art Center in Minneapolis. These concerts were recorded and later issued on LP by the Soma Recording Company, based in Minneapolis. Evans also recorded extensively for Audiophile Records.

He returned to Minneapolis and continued playing jazz up until his last recordings in 1975. He also founded the Bloomington Symphony Orchestra of Minneapolis and conducted it until his death.

In 1999, a yearly Doc Evans Jazz Festival was held in Minnesota for nine years.
