= Danny Alvin =

American jazz drummer (1902–1958)

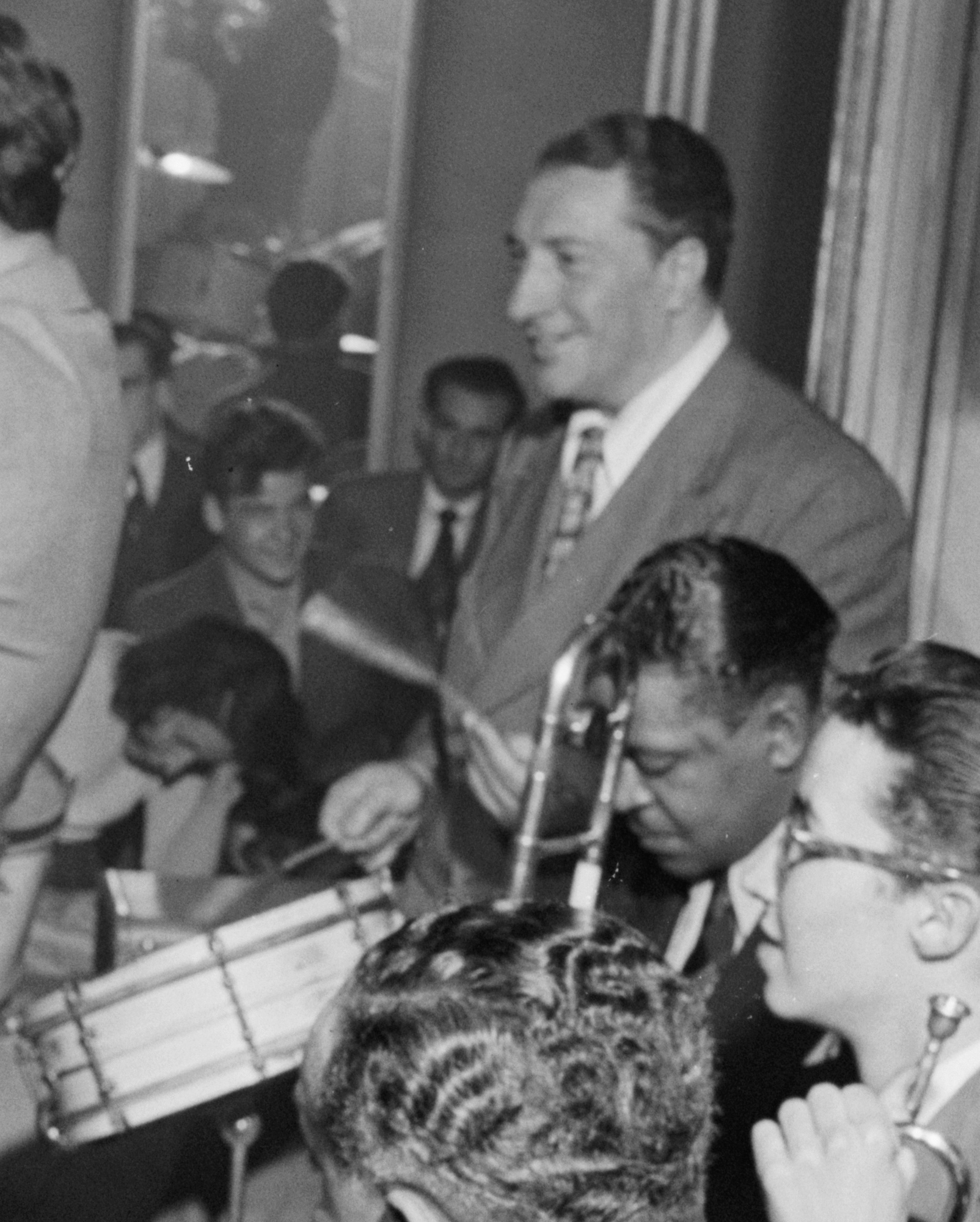
Danny Alvin, 1947

Danny Alvin (November 29, 1902 in New York City – December 6, 1958 in Chicago) was an American jazz drummer and bandleader.

Alvin was the father of guitarist Teddy Walters. He played with Sophie Tucker at the New York club Reisenweber's in 1919, then moved to Chicago in the early 1920s. He played in both cities over the course of his career, playing with Sidney Bechet, George Brunis, Buck Clayton, Wild Bill Davison, Wingy Manone, Joe Marsala, Art Hodes, Mezz Mezzrow, and George Zack. He recorded sparsely as a bandleader; his best-known issue was a 1958 album recorded for Stepheny Records.
