= Muggsy Spanier =

American jazz cornetist (1901–1967)

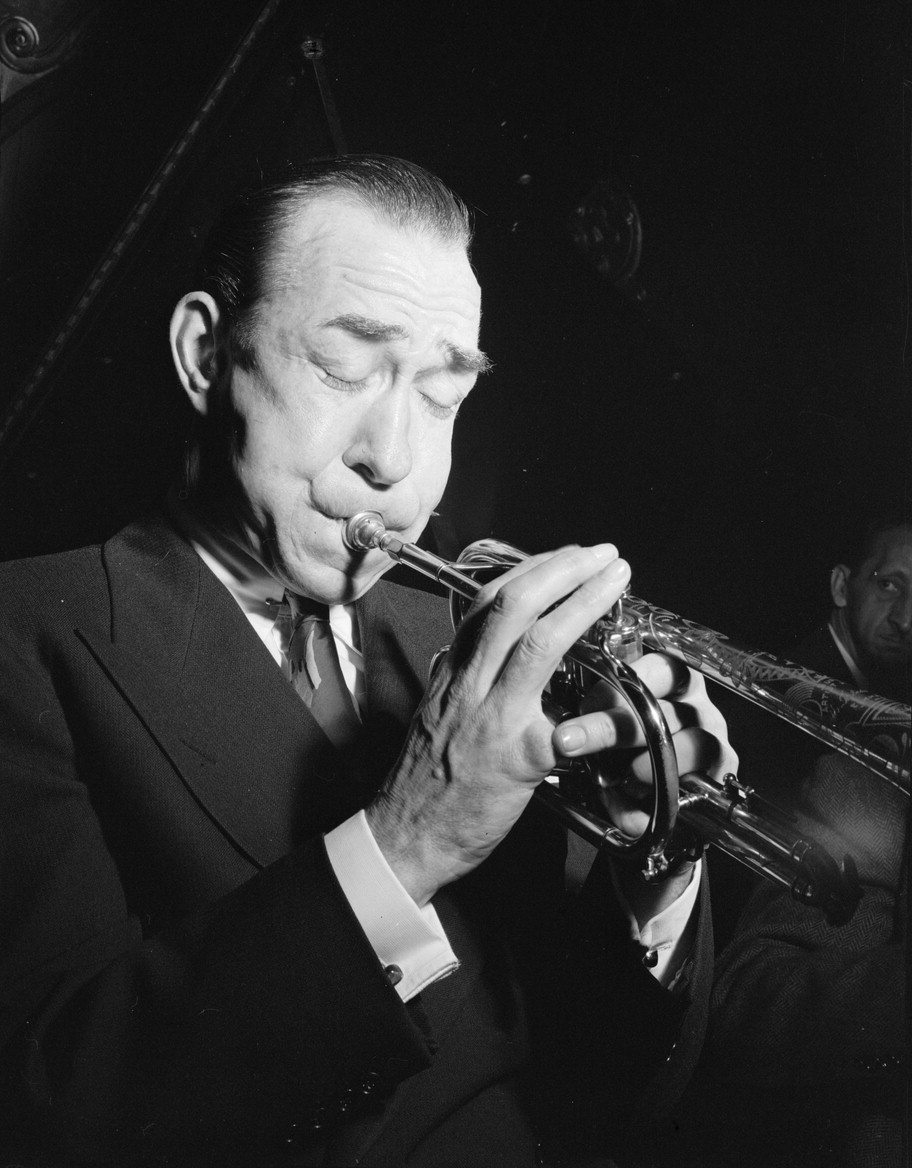
- Spanier performing at Nick's Tavern, New York, c. June 1946

Background information
- Born: Francis Joseph Spanier; November 9, 1901; Chicago, Illinois, US
- Died: February 12, 1967 (aged 65) Sausalito, California, US
- Genres: Jazz, Dixieland
- Occupation: Musician
- Instruments: Cornet, trumpet
- Years active: 1921–1964
- Labels: Bluebird, Mercury, RCA

Francis Joseph "Muggsy" Spanier (November 9, 1901 – February 12, 1967) was an American jazz cornetist based in Chicago. He was a member of the Bucktown Five, pioneers of the "Chicago style" that straddled traditional Dixieland jazz and swing.

== Life and career ==
Spanier was born in Chicago, Illinois, the son of Katherine Helen (O'Reilly) and William Spanier, a certified public accountant. His parents were from France and Ireland, respectively. At thirteen, he began playing the cornet and played with Elmer Schoebel in 1921. He borrowed the sobriquet of "Muggsy" from John "Muggsy" McGraw, the manager of the New York Giants baseball team. In the early 1920s, he played with the Bucktown Five.

In 1929, he became a member of a band led by Ted Lewis, then spent two years with Ben Pollack. After an illness, he assembled the eight-man group Muggsy Spanier and His Ragtime Band. In 1939, the band recorded several sessions of Dixieland standards for Bluebird Records, that were later called The Great Sixteen and influenced a Dixieland revival.

The band's members included George Brunies (later Brunis - trombone and vocals), Rod Cless (clarinet), George Zack or Joe Bushkin (piano), Ray McKinstry, Nick Ciazza or Bernie Billings (tenor sax), and Bob Casey (bass).

His other most important ventures were the quartet he co-led with Sidney Bechet (the 'Big Four') in 1940. From 1940 until 1941 he played with Bob Crosby. In the 1950s, he moved to the West Coast and joined Earl Hines's band from 1957 until 1959. After touring Europe, he retired in 1964.

== Songs ==
The Ragtime Band's theme tune was "Relaxin' at the Touro", composed by Spanier and Joe Bushkin, named for Touro Infirmary, the New Orleans hospital where Spanier had been treated for a perforated ulcer early in 1938. At the point of death, he was saved by Dr. Alton Ochsner who drained the fluid and eased his weakened breathing. One of Spanier's Dixieland numbers is a song he composed entitled, "Oh Doctor Ochsner."

"Relaxin' at the Touro" is a fairly straightforward 12-bar blues, with a piano introduction and coda by Joe Bushkin. The pianist recalled, many years later: "When I finally joined Muggsy in Chicago (having left Bunny Berigan's failing big band) we met to talk it over at the Three Deuces, where Art Tatum was appearing." Muggsy was now playing opposite Fats Waller at the Sherman hotel and we worked out a kind of stage show for the two bands. Muggsy was a man of great integrity. "We played a blues in C and I made up a little intro. After that I was listed as the co-composer of 'Relaxin' at the Touro'".

== Personal life ==
In 1950, in Chicago, Spanier's second marriage was to Ruth Gries O’Connell. He became the stepfather of her sons, Hollywood film writer and director Tom Gries (died 1977) and Charles Joseph Gries, later professionally known as Buddy Charles, a pop and jazz vocalist and pianist in Chicago. When Spanier was performing at a concert in Chicago in 1956, Buddy Charles was performing at the nearby Black Orchid nightclub. Spanier was heard to exclaim "that's my boy."

Muggsy Spanier died of an apparent heart attack in Sausalito, California, in February 1967, after years of ill health. He was 65. In his obituary he was described as "an expert on Chicago mobsters, almost all of whom were jazz patrons."
