= American Music Records =

American jazz record company and label

- Founded: 1944
- Founder: William Russell
- Defunct: 1957
- Distributor: Jazzology
- Genre: Jazz
- Country of origin: U.S.
- Location: New Orleans, Louisiana

American Music Records is a jazz record company and label that was established by Bill Russell in 1944.

Russell produced new recordings and reissues, concentrating on New Orleans jazz musicians such as Bunk Johnson, George Lewis, Baby Dodds, and Wooden Joe Nicholas. In 1957 Storyville Records produced American Music's reissues on vinyl LP, as did the Japanese label Dan. Starting in 1989, George Buck's Jazzology group began releasing the back catalog on its American Music CD series.

== Roster ==
Musicians on the "Yellow Series" of American Music Records included:

Emile Barnes, Albert Burbank, Louis Nelson Delisle, Baby Dodds,Natty Dominique,Cie Frazier,George Guesnon,

Darnell Howard,Kid Howard,Albert Jiles, Bunk Johnson,Louis Keppard, George Lewis,Charlie Love, Louis "Kid Shots" Madison, Lawrence Marrero,Herb Morand, Louis Nelson,Wooden Joe Nicholas, Alcide Pavageau,Jim Robinson,Johnny St. Cyr and Kid Thomas Valentine.

Musicians on other series included:

- Alvin Alcorn
- Red Allen
- George Baquet
- Louis Barbarin
- Paul Barbarin
- Polo Barnes
- Sidney Bechet
- Barney Bigard
- Peter Bocage
- John Brunious
- Raymond Burke
- Cag Cagnolatti
- Mutt Carey
- John Casimir
- Papa Celestin
- Kid Clayton
- Kid Sheik
- Joe Darensbourg
- Eureka Brass Band
- Pops Foster
- Minor Hall
- Captain John Handy
- Percy Humphrey
- Willie Humphrey
- Clifford "Snags" Jones
- Punch Miller
- Albert Nicholas
- Olympia Brass Band
- Kid Ory
- Billie Pierce and De De Pierce
- Alton Purnell
- Kid Rena
- Emanuel Sayles
- Muggsy Spanier
- Albert Warner
- Johnny Wiggs
- Buster Wilson

== See also ==
- List of record labels
