= Jon Marks =

British jazz pianist (1947–2007)

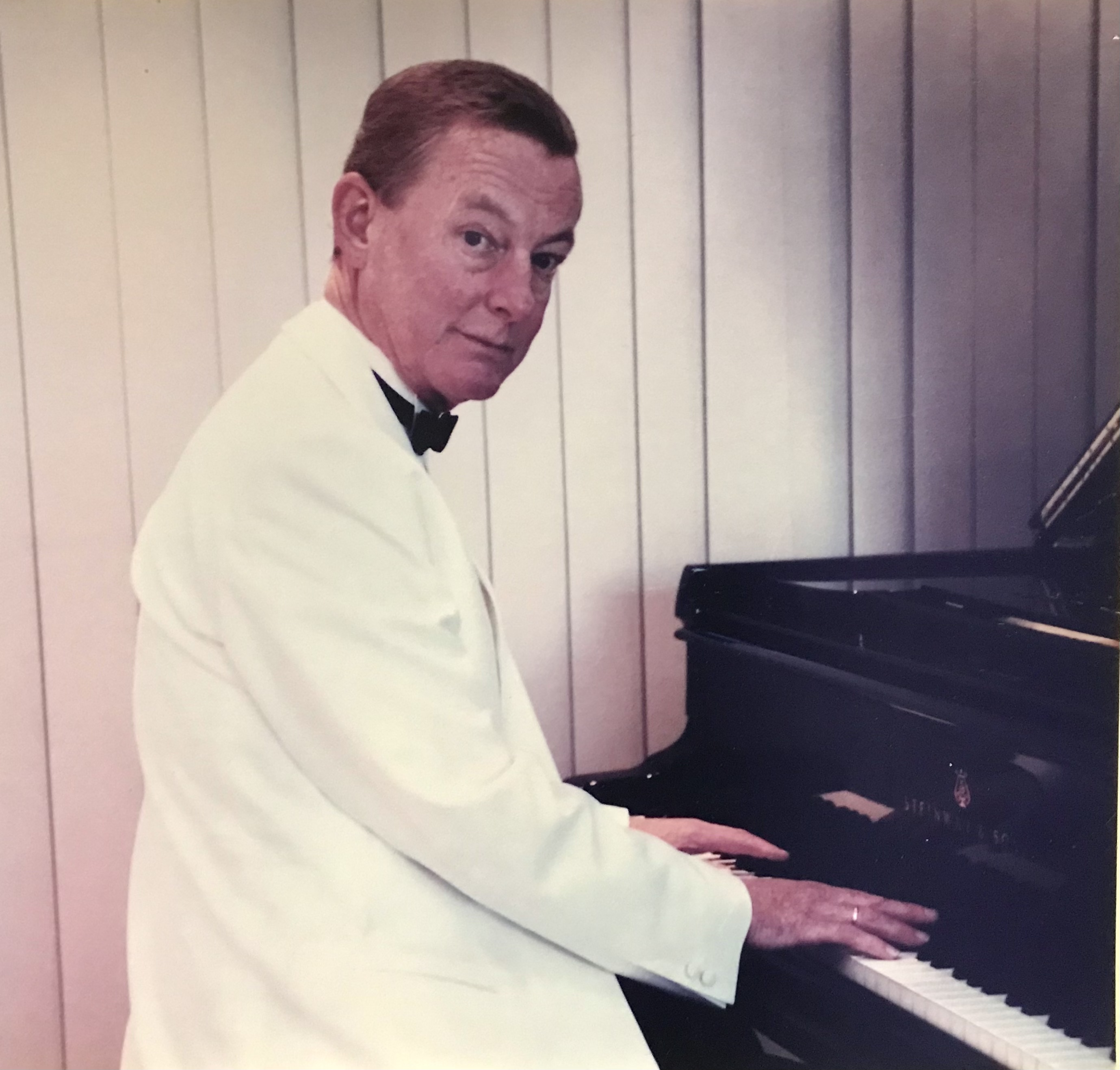
- Marks in 2000
- Born: Jonathan Marks; 11 July 1947; Slough, Buckinghamshire,England
- Died: 23 July 2007 (aged 60); Berlin, Germany

Jonathan Marks (11 July 1947 – 23 July 2007) was a British jazz pianist.

== Biography ==
=== Early influences ===
Jon Marks began learning the piano at the age of seven. The lessons discontinued at age 12 when interest in New Orleans Jazz and improvisation occupied his practice time. His brother David Marks played the banjo. When he was 14 David took Jon to a jazz gig where he snuck in behind the piano and played for the first time in public - he never looked back. Later, Jon was fortunate to work together with Alton Purnell (Bunk Johnson and George Lewis' pianist) and received musical assistance and inspiration from him from 1964 until Purnell's death in 1987. Other major influences included pianists Joe Robichaux, Lester Santiago and Sing Miller. Marks formed a school band at age 12 and at 15 was co-leader of a semi-pro jazz band, the "San Jacinto Jazz Band" in Portsmouth. Jon's first professional band was the "Keith Smith Climax Jazz Band" which facilitated a move back to London in 1964 when he joined them aged 17.

=== Tours and festivals ===
Jon Marks toured Britain, Europe, the US, Brazil, Australia, Japan, and other parts of Asia. He recorded with Keith Smith before joining Barry Martyn's Band in 1968. He stayed with Martyn until the band's demise in 1973 due to Martyn's migration to the USA. He played with Kid Martyn's Ragtime Band at the first two New Orleans Jazz & Heritage Festivals in 1968 and 1969 and at Louis Armstrong's 70th Birthday celebration, "Hello Louis", in 1970 when he was photographed alongside Louis Armstrong and his enormous birthday cake, and whiskey and bourbon fountains. Marks toured the US annually with Martyn six years running, using New Orleans as the finishing point where he could gain valuable experience at Preservation Hall and other local venues.

After 1973, he freelanced working with various units including the White Eagle Band of Berlin with the late clarinetist/saxophonist Peter Müller and trumpeter Raimer Lösch. Marks also played with Kid Thomas, clarinetist/saxophone player Sammy Rimington, and the Louis Nelson Band, among others. Marks made his home-base in Berlin, Germany in the late 1970s from where he produced recordings and played with his own New Orleans Jazz trio. During the 1980s he began touring with Sammy Rimington's Band again and also toured with the White Eagle Band, Berlin, and the Maryland Jazz Band, Cologne. Together with Rimington, in 1983 he toured with Kid Thomas' Algiers Stompers in Europe, the last tour of this legendary band. He also toured with Louis Nelson's band in Switzerland in 1987. He was an annual guest of the Big Easy Jazz Band in Connecticut during the 1990s, touring and recording in New England and the Tri-State area and appearing at the 1991 Santa Rosa Festival, California. He again appeared at the New Orleans Jazz Festival in 1996 with Sammy Rimington. Jon played regularly at the Ascona New Orleans Jazz Festival in Switzerland.

=== Recordings and artists ===
Artists that Marks recorded with include: Percy Humphrey, Kid Thomas, Alvin Alcorn, Thomas Jefferson, Leo Dejan, Kid Sheik Colar, Louis Nelson, Preston Jackson, Clyde Bernhardt, Paul Barnes, Willie Humphrey, Emanuel Paul, Sammy Lee, Orange Kellin, Andrew Morgan, John Defferary, Sammy Rimington, Floyn Turnham, Chester Zardis, Hayes Alvis, Frank Fields, Benny Booker, Lloyd Lambert, Emanuel Sayles, Don Vapie, Father Al Lewis, Stanley Williams, Freddie Kohlman, Louis Barbarin, Zutty Singleton, Teddy Edwards, Stanley Stevens, Barry Martyn, Arvell Shaw and Doc Cheatham.

Apart from the above-mentioned artists Marks toured or played with: Singers Topsy Chapman, Thais Clark, Sylvia "Kumumba" Williams, Jan Harrington, Carrie Smith, Minnie Minepreo; trumpeters Jabbo Smith, Wingy Manone, John Brunious, Wendell Brunious, Wallace Davenport, Teddy Riley, Andrew Blakeney, Norbert Susemihl, Ken Colyer, Geoff Bull; Clarinetests and Saxophonists Barney Bigard, Albert Nicholas, Benny Carter, Jo "Brother Cornbread" Thomas, Jo Darensbourg, Harald Dejan; Pianists Alton Purnell, Sweet Emma Barrett, Alex "Duke" Burrell, Don Ewell, Ralph Sutton, Art Hodes; Trombonists Trummy Young, Gene Conners; Bassists Ed "Montudie" Garland, Adolphus Morris, Rodney Richardson, Bob Culverhouse; Banjoists Nappy Le Marr, Koen De Cauter; Drummer Trevor Richards, amongst many others.

Of Marks' playing, Herb Friedwald wrote in the liner notes to The Orange Kellin Trio (GHB Records, BCD-384) "Marks is one of the best and certainly the most forceful of the pianists now playing in this idiom."

Just before his death in 2007 Marks was working on "The Gene Krupa Story", a 2-hour multi-media Big Band Swing Show, with the Berlin-based drummer, entrepreneur and producer Arthor Von Blomberg. The musical was subsequently presented at the Broadway Palm Dinner Theatre, New York, with Arthor von Blomberg as Gene Krupa and a 16-piece orchestra.

=== Legacy ===
In addition to his more than 200 recordings, the Lippmann+Rau Foundation, Palmental 1, 99817 Eisenach, Germany, holds a significant Jon Marks collection, donated to the archive posthumously, containing many photo albums documenting his eventful musical life. The collection also includes around 200 LPs, concert posters, music magazines and audio cassettes.
