= Sammy Rimington =

British musician (born 1942)

Samuel Rimington (born 29 April 1942, in Paddock Wood, Kent, England), is an English jazz reed player. He has been an active New Orleans jazz revivalist since the late 1950s.

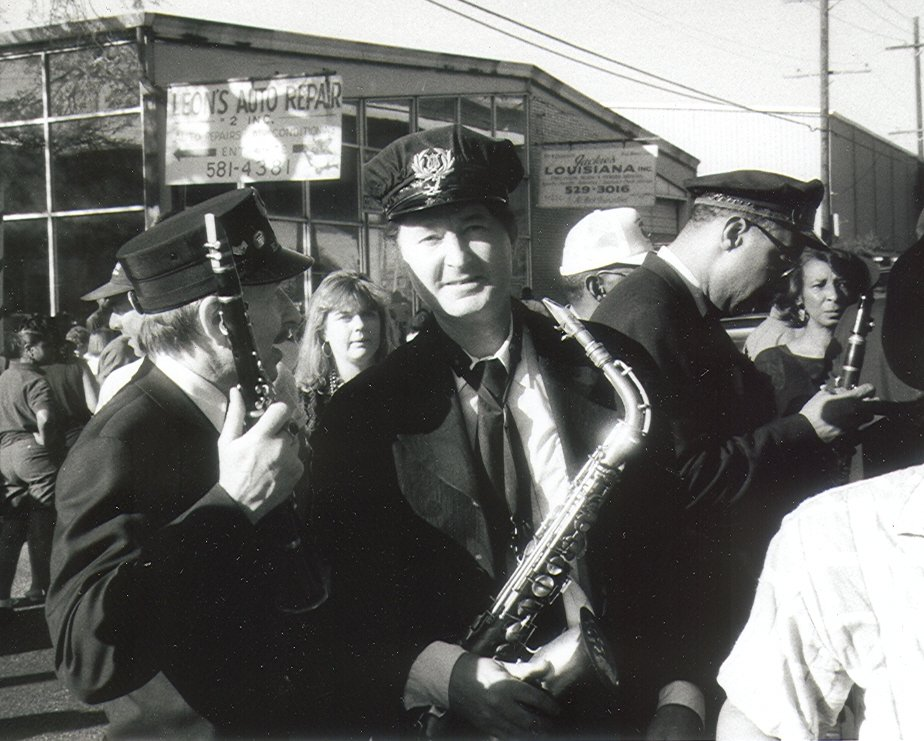
Rimington, center, at jazz funeral for Danny Barker, New Orleans, 1994. He is flanked by clarinetists Chris Burke at left and Dr. Michael White at right.

Rimington played with Barry Martyn in 1959. He became a professional musician in 1960 when he joined the band of Ken Colyer. He stayed with Colyer until 1965 and then moved to the U.S. and worked with Big Bill Bissonnette's Easy Rider Jazz Band and the December Band. He made some jazz fusion recordings early in the 1970s, but most of his work has been in the New Orleans jazz vein, playing with Louis Nelson, Big Jim Robinson, Chris Barber, Kid Thomas Valentine, and Captain John Handy. He has recorded extensively as a bandleader since the early 1960s. Rimington's main influences were George Lewis on clarinet and Captain John Handy on alto sax.

Since 1982, Rimington gave for many years a concert annually at Floda Church near the town Katrineholm, Sweden. In the beginning, he was invited by the priest Lars "Sumpen" Sundbom, who was himself a jazz musician. Rimington frequently recorded with, and was accompanied on tours by, the pianist Jon Marks.

In 2010, he undertook some gigs with Anders Johansson.

== Discography ==
=== As leader ===
- 1963 George Lewis Classics (Jazz Crusade)
- 1973 New Orleans Music (California Condor)
- 1977 Sammy Rimington and His New Orleans Quartet (Herman)
- 1986 Sammy Rimington in New Orleans 1986 (Black Bottom)
- 1986 Exciting Sax (Progressive)
- 1988 Of Days That Have Gone By with Barry Martyn (GHB)
- 1994 New Orleans Christmas (GHB)
- 1995 Everybody's Talkin' (GHB)
- 1995 More Exciting Sax (Progressive)
- 1995 On Tour With T. Jefferson (GHB)
- 1995 Watering the Roots with Big Bill Bissonnette (Jazz Crusade)
- 1999 Reed My Lips (Jazz Crusade)
- 2000 Live in-Store at the Louisiana Music Factory
- 2002 Last Session at San Jacinto Hall (GHB)
- 2008 Visits New Orleans (Arhoolie)
- 2015 Sammy Rimington Quintet (GHB)

== As sideman ==
With Ken Colyer

- 1963 When I Leave the World Behind
- 1972 The Sunny Side of Ken Colyer
- 1972 Very Very Live at the 100 Club
- 2001 BBC Jazz Club, Vol. 7
- 2002 Serenading Auntie
- 2007 Studio 51 Club Sessions
- 2006 Live at the York Arts Centre 1972
- 2008 Studio 51 Club Sessions, Vol. 2
- 2009 A Boston Concert With Ken Colyer's Jazzmen: June 1972

With Captain John Handy

- 1968 Very Handy!
- 1965 All Aboard, Vol. 1
- 1965 All Aboard, Vol. 2

With others

- 1966 Red Wing, Kid Thomas and the Easy Riders Jazz Band
- 1967 Zutty and the Clarinet Kings, Zutty Singleton
- 1992 Classic New Orleans Jazz, Vol. 2, Jim Robinson
- 1994 Live in Japan, Louis Nelson
- 1994 Emile Martyn's Band, Emile Martyn
- 1995 Volume 1: Int'l Jazz Band, Emanuel Paul
- 1995 Volume 2: Int'l Jazz Band, Emanuel Paul
- 1995 New Orleans Footwarmers, Chester Zardis
- 1995 First European Tour, Kid Sheik
- 1996 River Stay Way, Chris Blount/Norman Thatcher/Dave Vickers
- 1998 Then & Now, Big Bill Bissonnette and His Easy Riders Jazz Band
- 1999 Walking with the King, Gregg Stafford
- 1999 The BBC Jazz from the 70's & 80's, Humphrey Lyttelton
- 1999 BBC Jazz from the 70's & 80's, Vol. 2, Bruce Turner
- 2000 New Orleans Stompers, Kid Sheik
- 2000 At Algiers Point Louisiana, Cliff Billett
- 2001 Max Lager's New Orleans Stompers – Featuring Sammy Rimington & Norbert Susemihl
- 2004 Jazz Celebration, Peter Meyer
- 2005 Live Streets Rouen France, Paragon Brass Band
- 2005 Palm Court Jazz All Stars, Lars Edegran
- 2007 New Orleans Jazz, Lars Edegran
- 2006 Memories of Kid Thomas, French Preservation New Orleans Jazz Band
- 2009 New Orleans Reunion, Wendell Brunious
- 2008 A New Orleans Visit: Before Katrina, Michael Doucet
- 2013 On Tour, Sammy Price
