= Harrison Verrett =

- Harrison Verrett

Background information
- Born: Harrison Verrett; February 27, 1907; Napoleonville, Louisiana, U.S.
- Died: October 13, 1965 (aged 58) New Orleans, Louisiana, U.S.
- Genres: Jazz, rhythm and blues
- Occupation: Musician
- Instruments: Guitar, banjo
- Years active: c.1920s – c.1960s

Harrison Verrett (February 27, 1907 – October 13, 1965) was an American jazz and rhythm & blues guitarist/banjoist who performed and recorded for over 40 years.

== Early life ==
Harrison Verrett was born to Joseph Verrett and Mary (Lee) Verrett in Napoleonville in Assumption Parish, Louisiana. The family moved to New Orleans in 1910 and eventually numbered nine children. Their New Orleans cousins Lester Young and his brother Lee would later become professional musicians. As a teenager, Harrison Verrett would go to hear Chris Kelly play at white people's lawn parties in the uptown 10th Ward. He also tried playing mellophone in parade bands, but said he "got tired of walking". Verrett took lessons in trumpet and banjo at age 15 from bassist Dave Perkins, who played in Johnny Brown's jazz band. He joined Brown's band as a trumpet player, but "not having teeth it used to bother me so I gave the trumpet up". He was a banjoist with the band for three years. As a teenager he played in jazz bands at the Milneburg resort area along Lake Ponchartrain.

At age 18, Verrett went to Biloxi, Mississippi, and joined a medicine show band that featured pianist Earl Hines. He toured with the show for a year, including through Canada. He left the band in Omaha, Nebraska, and returned briefly to New Orleans. From there, he went back to Biloxi to work on excursion boats and at a resort for five to six years. These boats, the Non Pareil and the Pan American, ferried passengers out to the Isle of Caprice (originally named Dog Key Island), one of the Gulf of Mexico barrier islands off the Mississippi coast. The enterprising businessmen who changed the name of the island built a casino and hotel there. Bands played on the boats and at the resort. Because the island was out of federal jurisdiction, businesses were allowed to serve alcohol during Prohibition. The island, located about 12 miles offshore, was later cut in half by a hurricane, then eroded by a series of repeated storms and completely submerged.

== Career ==
Verrett left the Isle of Caprice employment to play in New Orleans, and occasionally the Mississippi Gulf Coast in taxi dance bands in the late 1920s. In the 1930s, he led a band at the Fern Cafe, a popular dance hall in the French Quarter. The Fern featured gambling and a lunch counter. Musicians such as Armand Hug, Raymond Burke, and "Stale Bread" Lacoume performed in black tuxedos with ribbon ties. The favorite dances among the regular customers were the "slow drags" which, according to dance historian Richard Powers, included many different ways of dancing called by that name based on black social dances and their white variations. In the late 1920s Verrett also played in a banjo band with Emmanuel Sayles that consisted of five banjos. At the time, he considered René Hall the best banjoist in New Orleans. Hall was born in Louisiana and got his start with Papa Celestin's band in the 1920s, recording for the first time with pianist Joe Robichaux and the New Orleans Rhythm Boys in 1933. In the 1950s, Hall became a premier session guitarist on the West Coast.

Verrett married Philonese Domino in 1932 and quit the Fern Cafe in 1934. He joined Charlie Smith's big band in New Orleans, playing first trumpet for six months, until dental problems recurred. After that, he stayed with stringed instruments. He performed with a WPA band in 1936. In 1938, he moved to California and, by 1940, returned to New Orleans, where he played spot jobs in the French Quarter. Verrett relocated in 1941 to Oxnard, California, taking an essential job with the Navy to stay out of the service. He worked as a carpenter, and his wife Philonese as a cook, at the nearby naval base at Port Hueneme and played nights at saxophonist Earl Fortier's club. His brother Leon Verrett moved his family and daughter Shirley to California during World War Two to get away from the intolerance and racism in Louisiana, settling in Oxnard near Harrison and Philonese. Leon was a Seventh-day Adventist who played saxophone and clarinet, but only in church. Shirley Verrett later became an internationally renowned opera singer and concert recitalist. Harrison Verrett eventually entered the Army as a private in 1943. He and wife Philonese hosted her teenage brother Antoine “Fats” Domino for a stay in Oxnard in 1945. Verrett showed his young brother-in-law the basics on Domino's family piano years earlier by labeling the piano keys and showing him chords and scales. "He was the one that taught me the foundations," said Domino, referring to Verrett. "Once he showed me the chords, I could play with just about any band." In the beginning, Domino had difficulty singing in tune with his piano playing. Once he remedied this inconsistency, Verrett got him into the musicians' union and booked him at clubs.

Back in New Orleans, Verrett performed with Papa Celestin from 1945 to 1951, including at the Paddock Lounge and the Court of Two Sisters. In 1947, bassist Billy Diamond assembled a band he called "The Solid Senders" with himself on bass, Harrison Verrett on guitar, Frank Parker on drums, and twenty-year-old Fats Domino on piano. The group played at the Hideaway, a club in the lower 9th Ward. Bandleader Dave Bartholomew took Imperial Records owner Lew Chudd to hear the group in 1949, and Chudd signed Domino to a recording contract. Verrett advised Domino not to sell his songs outright, but to get a publishing contract for royalties. Dave Bartholomew became his producer.

Verrett recorded with Papa Celestin and his Original Tuxedo Jazz Orchestra for De Luxe Records on the October 26, 1947 session that marked Celestin's return to recording for the first time since 1928. Musicians included Oscar "Papa" Celestin on trumpet and vocals, Bill Matthews on trombone, Alphonse Picou on clarinet, Paul Barnes on alto sax, Sam Lee on tenor sax, Mercedes Fields on piano, Harrison Verret on guitar, Ricard Alexis on bass, and Christopher "Black Happy" Goldston on drums. The four titles were "Hey La Bas", "Marie Laveau", "Josephine", and "Maryland My Maryland". He also played banjo on Archibald's (John Leon Gross) first release "Stack-A-Lee" for Imperial Records, which hit #10 on the Billboard R&B chart in June 1950. He worked as a carpenter at the time to supplement his income from music. Verrett left Papa Celestin's band to accompany his homesick brother-in-law on the road, often acting as the Domino band's driver. He provided the guitar part on Fats Domino's first #1 R&B chart hit "Goin' Home" in 1952.

In 1953, Verrett and Domino befriended blues musician Boogie Bill Webb when he moved to New Orleans. Webb said about Verrett, "Now Harrison, he taught me a lot. He could play guitar, banjo, mandolin, and read music." Verrett played a part in Webb's first Imperial recordings by introducing him to Dave Bartholomew. Imperial released "Bad Dog" and "I Ain't For It", co-written by Boogie Bill Webb and Harrison Verrett. In the fall of 1956 Fats Domino recorded "Blueberry Hill", a standard first published in 1940 and covered by Gene Autry, Glenn Miller, and Bing Crosby, among others. Verrett and Domino liked Louis Armstrong's 1949 version of the song so Verrett taught his brother-in-law the song. The song went to #1 on the R&B chart and #4 on the pop chart. Verrett was instrumental in Domino's recording of traditional jazz songs and standards. Fats remembered, "Harrison used to tell me always to play some of those standard old songs because they never die."

== Later life ==
The official opening of Preservation Hall, a French Quarter music hall that featured musicians who had played jazz from its beginnings, was June 10, 1961. The band on that first night was Kid Sheik Colar (trumpet), George Lewis (clarinet), Eddie Summers (trombone), Harrison Verrett (banjo), Alcide "Slow Drag" Pavageau, and Alex Bigard (drums). Verrett also performed and recorded with Edward "Noon" Johnson's Bazooka Band and toured with Punch Miller's band. He performed regularly at Preservation Hall, while occasionally going on the road with Fats Domino's band. In November 1964, Verrett was driving the band bus in Arizona down a steep mountain section of Route 66 on the way to Las Vegas when he lost control and collided with an oncoming car. He sustained a sprained wrist and leg abrasions. Three band members were slightly injured, and four in the car suffered injuries, with one hospitalized. Domino was traveling in his own car with three other musicians from the band. Verrett was so rattled by the incident he would never drive for his brother-in-law again. After the crash, Fats Domino gave him a Cadillac.

New Orleans saxophonist David Lastie said of Verrett, "He was a hip old man. Very neat, very clean, and very direct. He’d say, 'Lastie, you played that wrong. It goes like this.' He wasn't gonna have no no's and but's about it. We be going on a job, he come pick us up in a big Cadillac. That was a gas for us then. He used to come pick us up and he'd tell us, 'You ain't got time for them women; you learn your music first. Don't smoke and please don't fool with none of them drugs. Always go on your job neat and clean, get your hair cut.' He say musicians should have a white shirt and black pants, black bow tie and red long tie. That was standard."

Harrison Verrett died of lung cancer at age 58 on October 13, 1965. In 2024, his great-nephew Durek Verrett married Princess Märtha Louise of Norway (daughter of Harald V, current king of Norway).
