= Manchester Sports Guild =

Manchester Sports Guild (MSG) was a jazz and folk music venue in Manchester, England, that flourished from 1961 to 1973.

== History ==
Manchester Sports Guild was a membership organisation founded in 1953 in Manchester, England, to promote amateur sports. L. C. Jenkins ("Jenks") was the founding General Secretary. It opened in April 1954. Shortly after moving into its first venue on Market Street, MSG, almost by accident, began promoting jazz. In 1961, MSG acquired its second venue at 8–10 Long Millgate, opposite Chetham's School of Music, near Manchester Cathedral, that became known as MSG's "Sports and Social Centre". The venue flourished until about 1973, when it was closed for imminent demolition, which didn't occur for a few years. The Long Millgate location was an old brick Victorian building with a bar on the ground floor, folk music upstairs, and jazz in its unadorned cellar. In 1962, shortly after opening the new venue, Jenks appointed Jack Swinnerton as Jazz Organiser. Henceforth, the MSG began booking internationally known jazz artists, performers who leaned more towards blues and traditional and swing idioms). The jazz cellar was also the centre of afterhours jam-sessions with American jazz artists who had, earlier in the evening, performed at other Manchester venues, particularly the Free Trade Hall.

In 1964, The Observer stated: "In the Manchester Sports Guild they have the best jazz centre in the country ... "

Frank Duffy ran the folk scene, upstairs. The Urbis building now occupies the site.

== Selected performing artists ==
=== Jazz and blues (in the cellar) ===
- Alvin Alcorn (1912–2003)
- Henry "Red" Allen (1908–1967)
- Jimmy Archey (1902–1967)
- Acker Bilk (1929–2014)
- Ruby Braff (1927–2003)
- Sandy Brown (1929–1975)
- Buck Clayton (1911–1991)
- Bill Coleman (1904–1981)
- Wild Bill Davison (1906–1989)
- Vic Dickenson (1906–1984)
- Dutch Swing College Band
- Al Fairweather (1927–1993)
- Pops Foster (1892–1969)
- Bud Freeman (1906–1991)
- Edmond Hall (1901–1967)
- John Handy (born 1933)
- Earl "Fatha" Hines (1903–1983)
- George Lewis (1900–1968)
- Alan Littlejohn (1928–1996)
- Humphrey Lyttelton (1921–2008)
- Wingy Manone (1900–1982)
- Louis Nelson (1900–1990)
- New Jazz Orchestra (1963–1970)
- Albert Nicholas (1900–1973)
- Johnny Parker (1929–2010)
- Emanuel Paul (1904–1988)
- Pee Wee Russell (1906–1969)
- Kid Thomas (1897–1987)
- Bruce Turner (1922–1993)
- Joe Turner (1907–1990)
- Alex Welsh (1929–1982)
- Bob Wallis (1934–1991)
- Ben Webster (1909–1973)
- Dicky Wells (1907–1985)
- Teddy Wilson (1912–1986)

=== Folk, pop, and poets (upstairs) ===
- Clarence Ashley (1895–1967)
- Dominic Behan (1928–1989)
- Roy Budd (1947–1993)
- Tony Capstick (1944–2003)
- Martin Carthy (born 1941)
- John Cooper Clarke (born 1949)
- Art Garfunkel (born 1941)
- Paul Simon (born 13th October 1941)
- Mike Harding (born 1944)
- Rosie Hardman (born 1945)
- Bert Jansch (1943–2011)
- Magna Carta
- Bill Monroe (1911–1996)
- Christy Moore (born 1945)
- The Spinners
- Dave Swarbrick (1941–2016)
- Wally Whyton (1929–1997)

== Selected discography ==
=== Jazz ===
Session / performance date	Artist (leader)	Album or Single	Label (Catalog No.)	Studio (Venue)	OCLC
17 October 1964	Pee Wee Russell (Note: Pee Wee Russell toured the United Kingdom October and November 1964. He performed at MSG October 16–18, 22, and November 1. ("Souvenir Programme: Pee Wee Russell UK Tour, October & November 1964" (No. 2522), accessible via National Jazz Archive)); With John Armatage's Jump Band	Pee Wee Russell with John Armatage's Jump Band	Jazzology JCD-355 (CD)	Live; Manchester Sports Guild; Manchester, England	
1 November 1964 & 16 July 1966	Pee Wee Russell; With Alex Welsh and His Band	Pee Wee Russell with Alex Welsh and His Band	Lake (nl) (E) LACD 157 (CD)	Live; Manchester Sports Guild; Manchester, England	
14 February 1965	Wild Bill Davidson; With Alex Welsh and His Band	Blowin' Wild	Jazzology J–18 & JCD-18 (CD)	Live; Manchester Sports Guild; Manchester, England	34476112
3 April 1965	Earl "Fatha" Hines; With Alex Welsh and His Band	Earl Hines With the Alex Welsh Band	Jazzology JCD-348 (CD)	Live; Manchester Sports Guild; Manchester, England	689528047; 555846651; 869054680
28 May 1966	Champion Jack Dupree	Jivin' With Jack	Jasmine (E) JASMCD 3008-9 (2CDs)	Live; Manchester Sports Guild; Manchester, England	53700207
21 May 1966	Rex Stewart; With Alex Welsh and His Band	Rex Stewart with the Alex Welsh Band	Jazzology JCD-345 (CD)	Live; Manchester Sports Guild; Manchester, England	
19 June 1966	Bud Freeman; With Alex Welsh and His Band	Bud Freeman With Alex Welsh & His Band	Lake (nl) (E) LACD 183 (CD)	Live; Manchester Sports Guild; Manchester, England	1044374278
11 September 1966	Ken Colyer; With George Lewis	Live 1966: Ken Colyer's Jazzmen With George Lewis	Lake (nl) (E) LACD 27 (CD)	Live; Manchester Sports Guild; Manchester, England	
9 October 1966	Bud Freeman; With Alex Welsh and His Band	Bud Freeman with the Alex Welsh Band	Jazzology JCD-332	Live; Manchester Sports Guild; Manchester, England	
13 November 1966 & 19 November 1966	Edmond Hall Quartet; With Alan Elsdon and His Jazz Band	Edmond Hall Quartet with Alan Elsdon and His Jazz Band	Jazzology JCD-240 & JCD-207	Live; Manchester Sports Guild; Manchester, England	
4 December 1966	Wild Bill Davison; With Alex Welsh and His Band	Wild Bill Davison with Alex Welsh and His Band	Lake (nl) (E) LACD 279 (CD)	Live; Manchester Sports Guild; Manchester, England	1090079059; 1044433254
14 January 1967	Stan Tracey Trio; With Ben Webster and Ronnie Scott	UK Live 1967 Vol. 2: Stan Tracey Trio with Ben Webster and Ronnie Scott	Jazzhus Disk (G) JP–3102 (CD)	Live; Manchester Sports Guild; Manchester, England	
12 February 1967	Albert Nicholas; With Alan Elsdon's Band	Albert Nicholas with Alan Elsdon's Band (Vol. 2)	Jazzology JCD-269 (CD)	Live; Manchester Sports Guild; Manchester, England	
19 February 1967 & 4 March 1967	Henry "Red" Allen; With the Alex Welch Band	Red Allen & The Alex Welsh Band	Red Allen (G) RA-CD-28 & RA-CD-13 (CD); Jazzology JCD-318 (CD)	Live; Manchester Sports Guild; Manchester, England	
26 March 1967 & 1 April 1967	Eddie "Lockjaw" Davis	Oh, Gee! Live in Manchester, 1967	Jasmine (E) JASCD 629 (CD)	Live; Manchester Sports Guild; Manchester, England	839403346
9 April 1967	Eddie Miller; With Alex Welsh	Eddie Miller With Alex Welsh	Jazzology JCD-298 (CD)	Live; Manchester Sports Guild; Manchester, England	434123442
6 May 1967	Bill Coleman	A Smooth One	Jasmine (E) JASCD 628 (CD)	Live; Manchester Sports Guild; Manchester, England	
14 & 28 May 1967	Peanuts Hucko; With Alex Welsh and His Band	Peanuts Hucko With Alex Welsh & His Band (Vol. 1)	Lake (nl) (E) LACD 171 & LACD 175 (CD)	Live; Manchester Sports Guild; Manchester, England	873091114
18 November 1967	Wild Bill Davison; With Alex Welsh and His Band ("Duet," audio)	Fidgety Feet	Jazzology JCD-231	Live; Manchester Sports Guild; Manchester, England	689527857
18 November 1967	Wild Bill Davison; With Alex Welsh and His Band	Wild Bill Davison in Europe	Jazzology JCD-151	Live; Manchester Sports Guild; Manchester, England	
24 & 25 February 1968	Teddy Wilson; With the Dave Shepherd Quartet	Teddy Wilson With The Dave Shepherd Quartet	Lake (nl) (E) LACD 161 (CD)	Live; Manchester Sports Guild; Manchester, England	

=== Folk ===
Session / performance date	Artist (leader)	Album or Single	Label (Catalog No.)	Studio (Venue)	OCLC
1968	The Taverners Folk Group; Alan Bell (1935–2019); Brian Osborne (1939–2002); Stuart Robinson (1942–2008); Pete Rodgers	A' Round With The Taverners Folk Group	Studio Republic Ltd. (Church Farm, Pinner, Middlesex) SRS 12074 (LP)	Live; Manchester Sports Guild; Manchester, England	

== MSG personnel ==
- John Pye, Executive Director
- Jack Swinnerton, Jazz Secretary
- L.C. Jenkins ("Jenks") (né Leslie Charles Jenkins; 1918–1986), General Secretary
- Bryn Pugh, MC in the folk room
- Frank Duffy, initial Folk Secretary
- John Dronsfield ("Drony"), Frank's successor
