= Sing Miller =

American jazz musician

James Edward "Sing" Miller (June 17, 1914, New Orleans, Louisiana – May 18, 1990) was an American jazz pianist and a member of the Preservation Hall Jazz Band.

Miller started his career as a singer with the Harmonizing Browns Quartet. His main instrument was banjo until late in the 1920s, when he moved to piano. He worked as a freelance musician with the Percy Humphrey band during the 1930s. After serving in the military during World War II, he was in a band led by drummer Earl Foster from 1945 to 1961.

He became a member of the Preservation Hall Jazz Band in New Orleans in the 1960s. He played in that band with Polo Barnes, Kid Sheik, Jim Robinson, and Kid Thomas Valentine. His rare performances as a solo act included 1979 and 1981 when he went on tour in Europe. He recorded one album for Dixie Records (1972) and one for Smoky Mary in 1978.
