= Big Bill Bissonnette =

American jazz musician

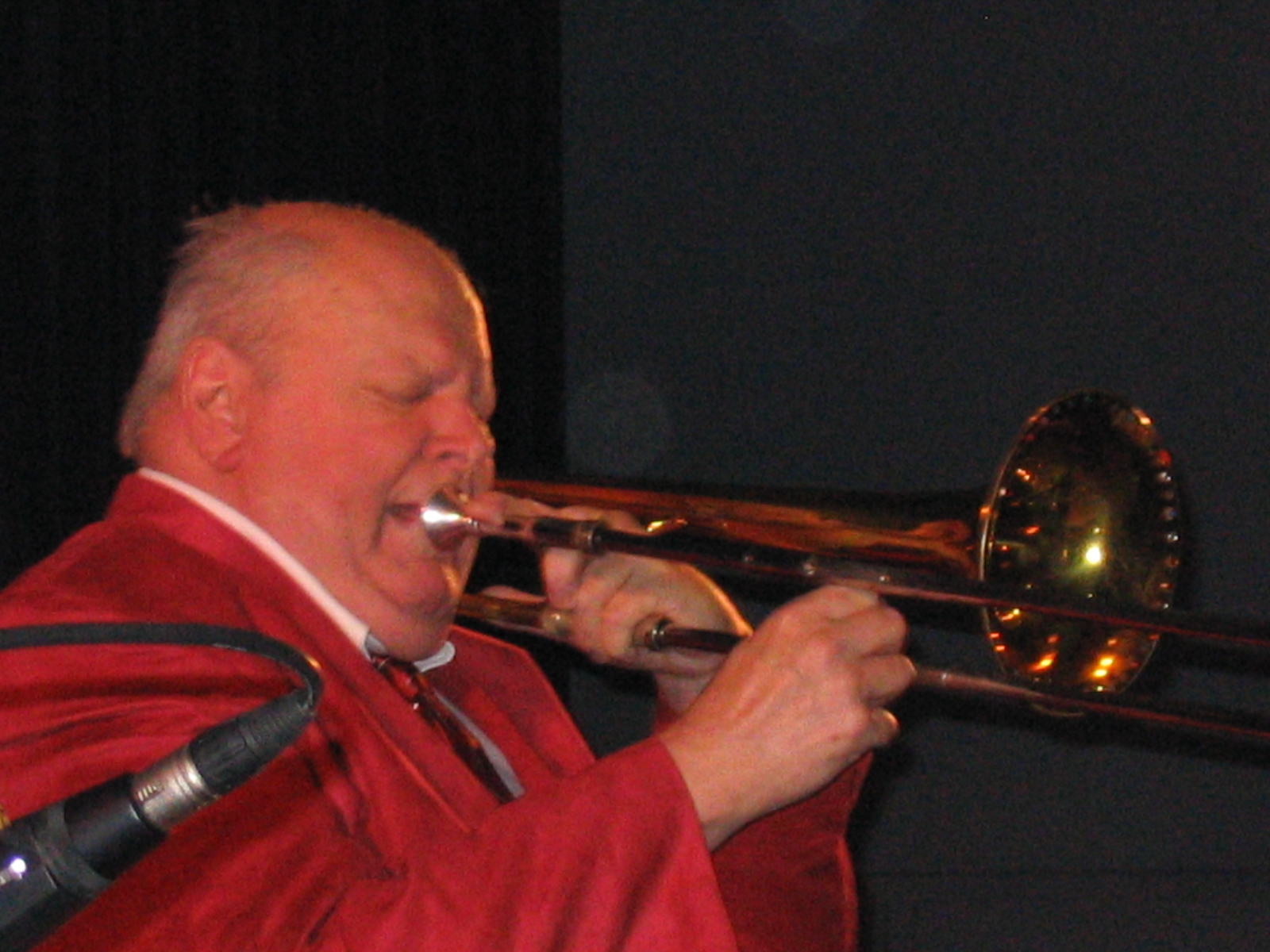

Big Bill Bissonnette (February 5, 1937 – June 26, 2018) was an American jazz trombonist, drummer, and record producer.

He was a strong advocate of New Orleans jazz as played by veteran African-American musicians. In the 1960s, he led his own group, the Easy Riders Jazz Band, formed his own label, Jazz Crusade, and organized northern tours for Kid Thomas Valentine, George Lewis, and Jim Robinson. He produced over 100 recorded jazz sessions for Jazz Crusade and appeared as trombonist or drummer on over 50 recording sessions of New Orleans jazz.

The Easy Riders Jazz Band was one of the most acclaimed revival bands of the 1960s. Bissonnette brought Sammy Rimington to the United States. During his career, he worked with Alvin Alcorn, Red Allen, Jimmy Archey, Polo Barnes, Albert Burbank, Alex Bigard, Don Ewell, Pops Foster, George Guesnon, Edmond Hall, Bob Helm, Tuba Fats Lacen, George Lewis, Fred Lonzo, Alcide Pavageau, George Probert, Kid Sheik, Zutty Singleton, Victoria Spivey, Gregg Stafford, Michael White, and Kid Thomas Valentine.

Bissonnette came in first place as "New Young Artist" in the 1965 Jazzology Jazz Poll. Over 30 years later he placed No. 5 among all jazz trombonists in the same poll. After a period out of music, he published his memoir, The Jazz Crusade, in 1992, reactivated his label, and began to play again. He spent much of the 1990s documenting the British jazz scene with his "Best of the Brits" album series.

He retired in 2006 and died 12 years later, in June 2018 at the age of 81.
