= Joe Watkins (musician) =

American jazz musician

Joe Watkins (October 24, 1900, New Orleans - September 13, 1969, New Orleans) was an American jazz drummer.

Watkins learned piano in his youth and began teaching himself to play drums late in his teens. Early in his career he worked with Kid Howard, Punch Miller, Herb Morand, and Isaiah Morgan. Starting in 1946 he worked with George Lewis, with whom he would play into the 1960s, including on recordings and international tours. Later, he recorded with Howard again and with Emanuel Sayles, though poor health forced him essentially into retirement in the mid-1960s.
