= Lars Edegran =

Swedish jazz musician and bandleader (born 1944)

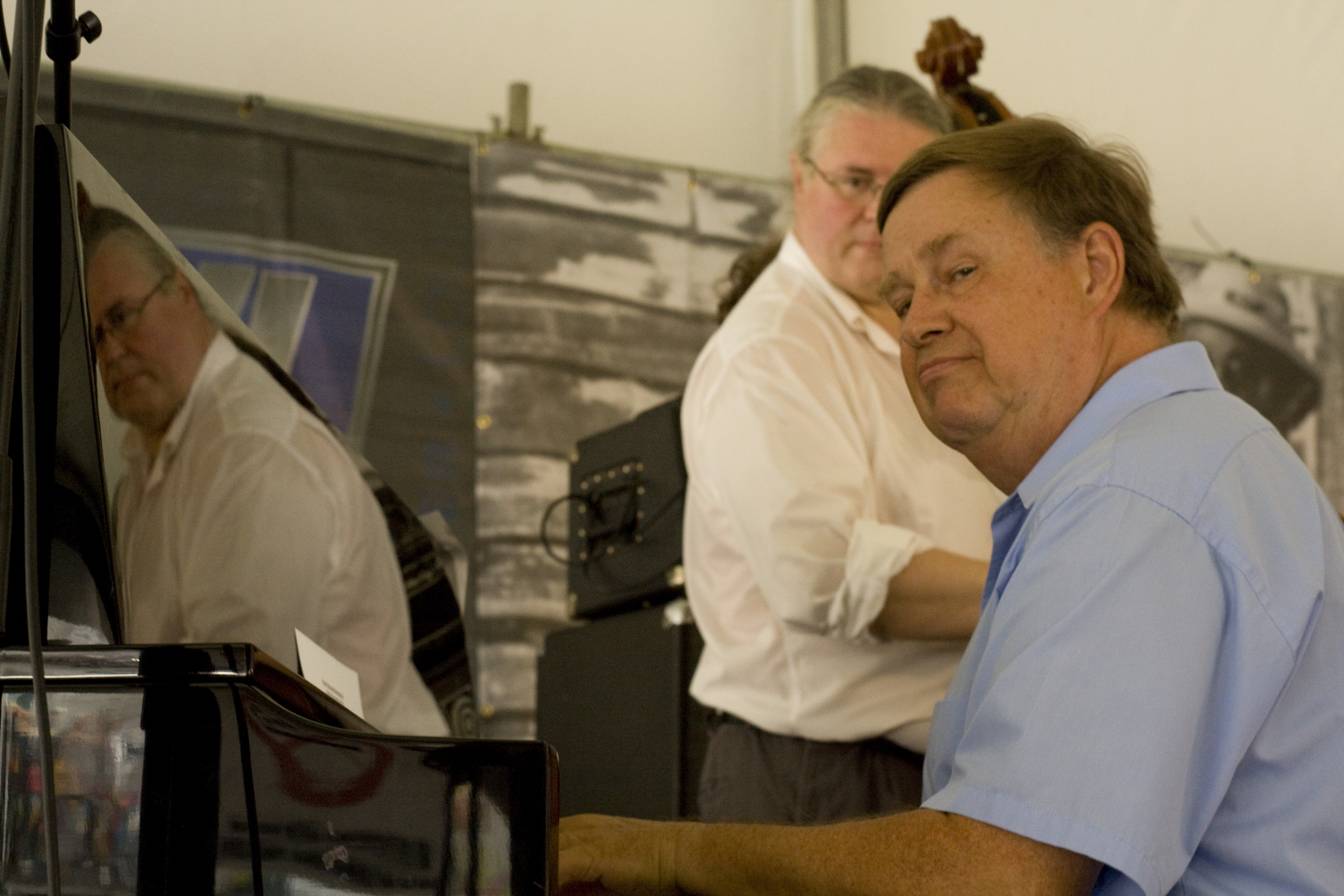
- Edegran in 2012

Background information
- Born: Lars Ivar Edegran; 1944 (age 81–82); Stockholm, Sweden
- Genres: Jazz
- Occupation: Musician

Lars Ivar Edegran (born 1944) is a Dixieland jazz musician and bandleader from Sweden. He most often plays piano, guitar, or banjo but has also played mandolin, clarinet, and saxophone.

Edegran was born in Stockholm, Sweden and played in New Orleans style groups in Sweden before moving to New Orleans in 1966. He played with many older and younger New Orleans musicians.

Edegran founded and is the leader of the New Orleans Ragtime Orchestra. He has toured and recorded extensively. He has also performed in Preservation Hall and in the Norwegian Seamen's Church in New Orleans.

His theatrical arrangements include the music for the show One Mo' Time.

== Discography ==
=== As leader ===
- New Orleans Ragtime Orchestra (Arhoolie, 1971)
- A Recital at Old Fireman's Hall, Westwego, Louisiana (Sonet, 1976)
- Pickles and Peppers (Stomp Off, 1991)
- Creole Belles (Arhoolie, 1994)
- Lars Edegran and his Santa Claus Revelers: Crescent City Christmas (G.H.B., 1996)
- Lars Edegran Presents Lionel Ferbos & John Robichaux (G.H.B., 1998)
- Lars Edegran and His New Orleans All Stars (G.H.B., 2000)
- Palm Court Jazz All Stars (G.H.B., 2004)
- Lars Edegran Presents Uncle Lionel (G.H.B., 2005)
- Sweet Hot and Lowdown (G.H.B., 2005)
- Triolian String Band (G.H.B., 2011)

=== As sideman ===
With Percy Humphrey

- Percy Humphrey and His Crescent City Joymakers (G.H.B., 1966)
- New Orleans to Scandinavia (Storyville, 1972)
- A Portrait of Percy Humphrey (Storyville, 1972)
- Percy Humphrey's Hot Six (CSA, 1975)

With others

- Geoff Bull, The Last Reunion (La Brava Music, 1997)
- Lionel Ferbos, Lionel Ferbos with Lars Edegran's New Orleans Band (G.H.B., 1995)
- Earl Hines, Earl Hines in New Orleans (Sonet, 1975)
- Calvin Johnson Jr., Native Son (Alma, 2013)
- Barry Martyn, Back to New Orleans (Rhythm)
- De De Pierce, De De Pierce and His New Orleans Stompers (Center, 1966)
- Preservation Hall Jazz Band, Preservation Hall Jazz Band Live! (Sony Masterworks, 1992)
- Jabbo Smith, Jabbo! (Memories 1982)
- Kid Thomas Valentine, Algiers Strut (Sonet, 1974)
- Pretty Baby (soundtrack) (ABC Records, 1978)
- Kid Thomas Valentine, Kid Thomas & Earl Humphrey with Orange Kellin's New Orleans Joymakers (G.H.B., 1996)
- Chris Tyle, The Smiler (Stomp Off, 1993)
