= Emile Barnes =

American jazz musician (1892–1970)

Emile Barnes (18 February 1892 – 2 March 1970) was a New Orleans jazz clarinetist.

Barnes studied under Lorenzo Tio Jr., Alphonse Picou, George Baquet, and Louis Nelson Delisle (also known as "Big Eye" Louis Nelson). Active professionally in New Orleans by 1908, he was long well regarded locally for his bluesy and distinctively individualistic style. He played with the Chris Kelly band in from the late 1910s through the 1920s. Barnes did not become widely known to jazz fans outside of New Orleans until he made recordings during the revival era for American Music Records. He performed at the opening night of Preservation Hall and also in his later years. In the 1930s he played with Wooden Joe Nicholas, and in the 1940s with Kid Howard. Barnes was featured on several Folkways Records New Orleans compilation albums during the 1950s, and again in the early 60s as a solo artist. When British trumpeter Ken Colyer jumped ship and visited New Orleans in 1953, he recorded with a pick-up band including Barnes.

Emile Barnes' younger brother Paul "Polo" Barnes was also a noted professional clarinetist.
