= Wendell Brunious =

American jazz trumpeter and bandleader (born 1954)

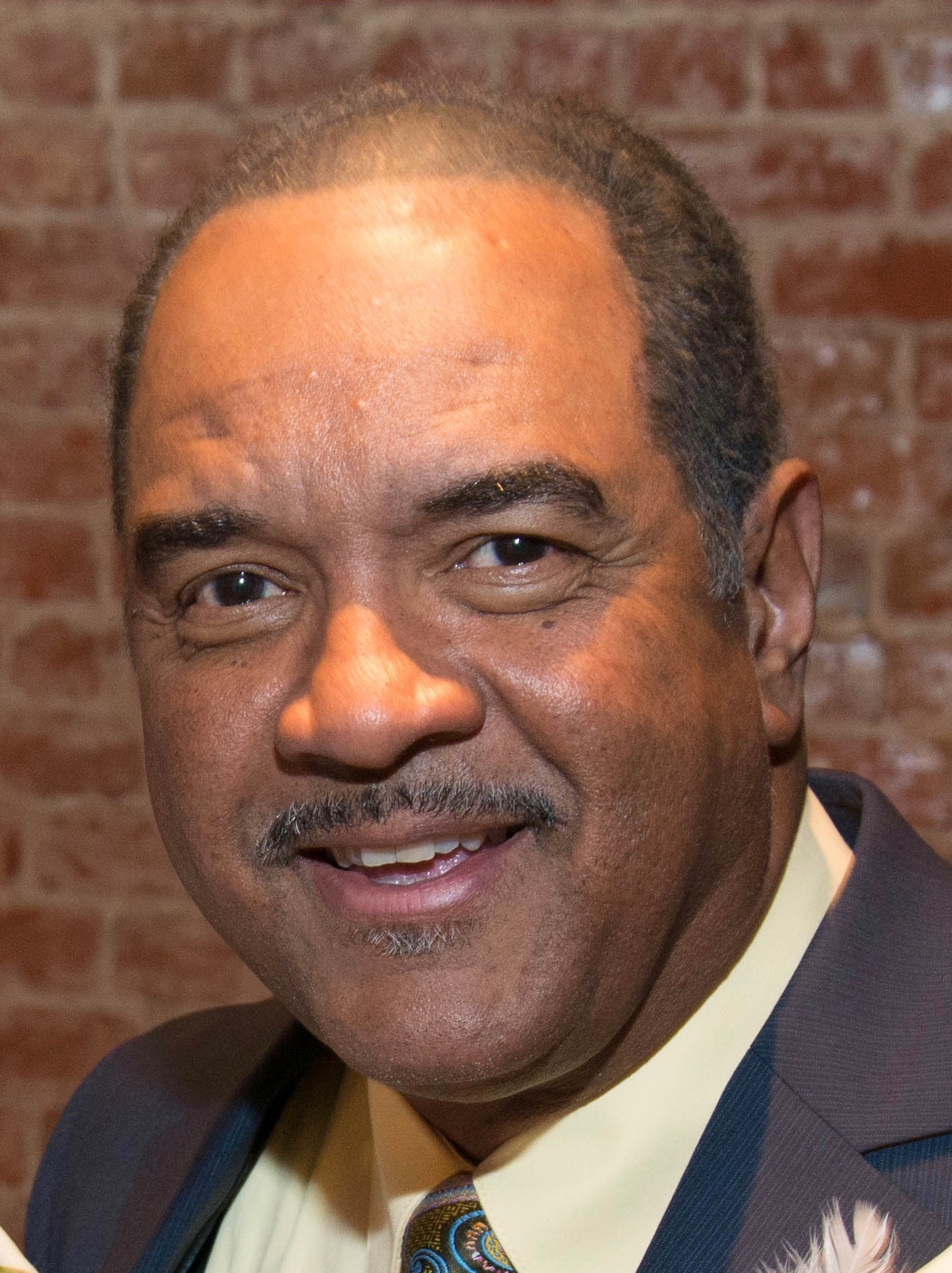
- Brunious in 2016

Background information
- Born: October 27, 1954 (age 71); New Orleans
- Genre: Jazz
- Occupations: Bandleader, Musical Director
- Instruments: Trumpet, Vocals

Wendell Brunious (born October 27, 1954) is an American trumpet player and bandleader associated with the jazz music of New Orleans.

Wendell was born on October 27, 1954, in New Orleans, Louisiana, to John Brunious Sr. and Nazimova (née Santiago). His father, a nephew of Paul Barbarin, played trumpet with Barbarin's band and later helped revive the Onward Brass Band. Brunious' brother, John Brunious Jr., was another notable New Orleans jazz trumpeter and a predecessor as bandleader of Preservation Hall Jazz Band. His nephew is Mark Braud, a successor as bandleader of Preservation Hall Jazz Band.

Brunious sang in Chief John and the Mahogany Hall Stompers in the 1960s, a group in which his father was also a member. He began on trumpet at age 11 and played at Paul Barbarin's funeral. He studied at Southern University (where he played with Danny Barker) and played dance music in clubs on Bourbon Street in the middle of the 1970s.

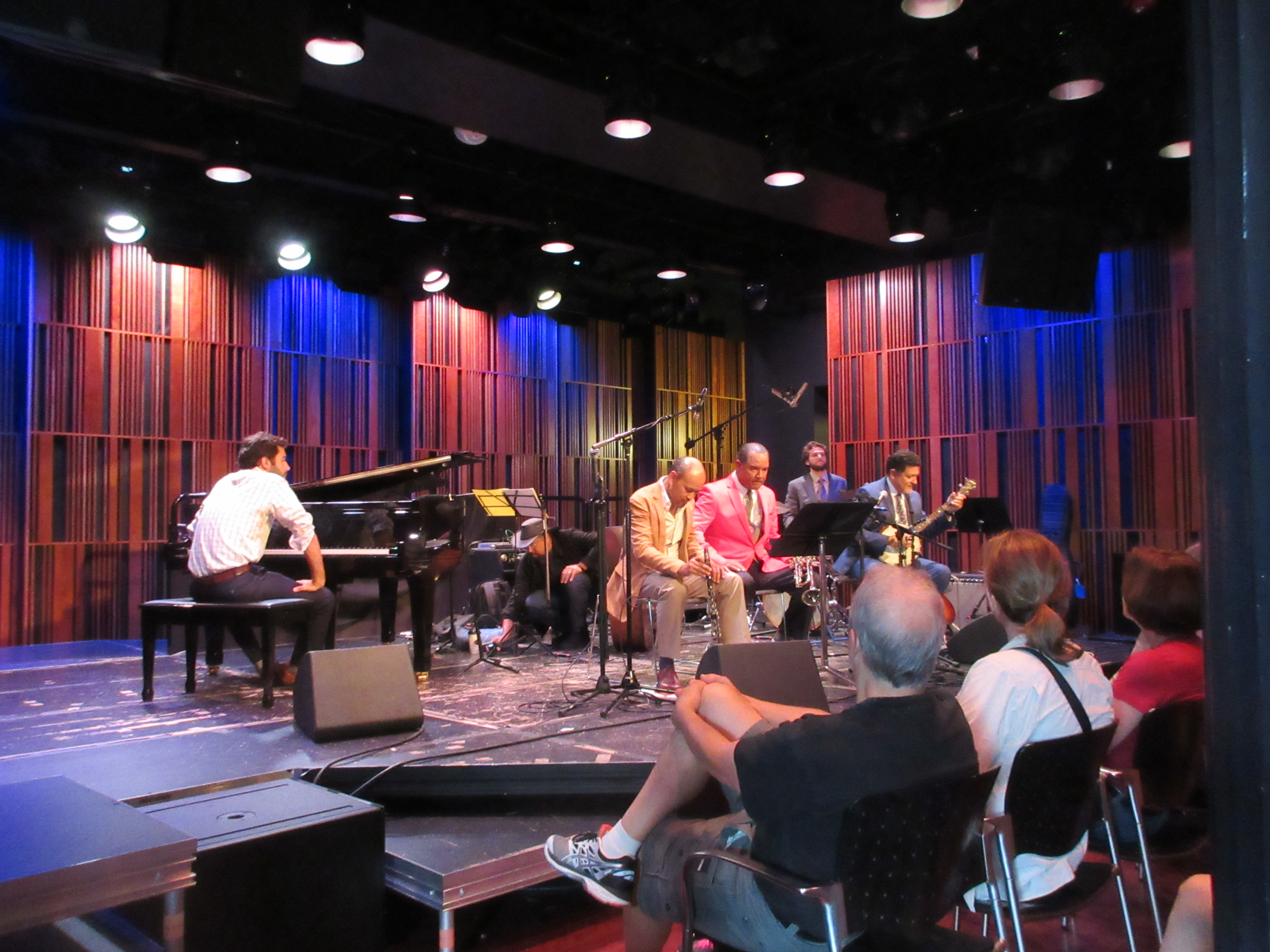
Brunious, Evan Christopher, and Don Vappie performing at the Public Domain Project Jazz at the Mint in New Orleans in May 2018

In 1976, Brunious substituted for his father in Albert "Papa" French's band for Mardi Gras, and by 1979 was playing regularly at Preservation Hall with Kid Thomas Valentine. He was named leader of the group upon Valentine's death in 1987. He also played with the Eureka Brass Band (1980), Lionel Hampton (1981), Linda Hopkins (1984), and Sammy Rimington (1984). He played with Louis Nelson in from 1986 to 1989, and did recordings with the Caledonia Jazz Band of Norway in 1986 and 1987. His first record as a leader came in 1986, which featured Nelson, Rimington, and Barry Martyn as sidemen. He later played with Michael White, Chris Barber, Papa Don Vappie, Bob Wilber, and the Pfister Siblings.

In 2023, he was named the inaugural musical director of Preservation Hall.

== Discography ==
- In the Tradition (GHB, 1986)
- Down in Honky Tonk Town (Wendell Brunious - Great Ideas Hb, 1996, September 9 at Audiophile Studio, New Orleans)
- Wendell Brunious (Wendell Brunious - Great Ideas Hb, 1998, August 28 in New Orleans)
- Mama Don't Allow It (GHB, 2003)
