= Geoff Bull =

Australian jazz trumpeter and bandleader

Geoffrey Randolph Bull (born 26 May 1942, Sydney) is an Australian jazz trumpeter and bandleader.

Bull played with the Melbourne New Orleans Jazz Band in 1961, then formed his own group, the Olympia Jazz Band, in Sydney; his sidemen included guitar/banjoist Geoff Holden, clarinetist Peter Neubauer, and bassist Dick Edser. The group played often at the Brooklyn and Orient hotels in Sydney. He toured internationally in 1966-67 and recorded with Alton Purnell, Barry Martyn, and Captain John Handy. He returned to New Orleans in 1974 and several times thereafter, recording with many local musicians. Additionally, he arranged for musicians such as Purnell and Sammy Price to tour Australia.
