= John Marks =

John Marks may refer to:

- John Marks (businessman) (1916–1982), business investor - refer Lend Lease Communities
- John Marks (mayor) (born 1947), mayor of Tallahassee, Florida
- John Marks (ice hockey) (born 1948), NHL player
- John Marks (tennis) (born 1952), Australian tennis player
- John B. Marks (1777–1872), political figure in Upper Canada
- John D. Marks (born 1943), author, and founder and president of Search for Common Ground
- John Marks (doctor) (1925–2022), chairman of the British Medical Association
- Johnny Marks (1909–1985), American songwriter
- John H. P. Marks (1908–1967), writer and translator
- John Marks (Australian politician) (1827–1885), Australian farmer and politician
- John L. Marks, American football coach
- John Christian (musician) (born 1981), Dutch dj, formerly known as John Marks

== See also ==
- Jon Marks (1947–2007), jazz pianist
- Jack Marks (disambiguation)
- Jonathan Marks (disambiguation)
- John Mark (disambiguation)
