= Jonathan Marks =

Jonathan Marks may refer to:

- Jonathan Marks, Baron Marks of Henley-on-Thames (born 1952), British barrister and Liberal Democrat peer
- Jonathan M. Marks (born 1955), American biological anthropologist at the University of North Carolina at Charlotte

== See also ==
- Jon Marks (1947–2007), British jazz pianist
- John Marks (disambiguation)
