= Jack Marks =

Jack Marks may refer to:

- Jack Marks (performer) (1895–1987), English performer and screenwriter
- Jack Marks (ice hockey) (1882–1945), Canadian ice hockey player
- Jack Marks (police officer) (1927–2007), Canadian police officer
- Jack Marks (politician) (1924–1998), Australian politician and trade union official

== See also ==
- John Marks (disambiguation)
