= John Mark (disambiguation) =

John Mark, a character in the Bible.

John Mark may also refer to:

- John Martin Mark, MP in the Northern Ireland parliament for Londonderry
- John Mark (athlete), lit the Olympic flame at the 1948 Summer Olympics

== See also ==
- John Marks (disambiguation)
