= Earl Humphrey =

American jazz musician (1902–1971)

- Born: September 9, 1902; New Orleans, Louisiana, U.S.
- Died: June 26, 1971 (aged 68); New Orleans, Louisiana, U.S.
- Genres: Jazz
- Instruments: Trombone

Earl Humphrey (September 9, 1902 – June 26, 1971) was an American jazz trombonist. He was the brother of noted New Orleans jazz players Willie Humphrey and Percy Humphrey.

== Career ==
Earl Humphrey learned to play trombone from his grandfather, and joined a traveling circus with his father in 1919. He traveled widely in the 1920s, and in 1927 recorded with Louis Dumaine. He played through the 1930s but retired to Virginia in the 1940s. In 1963, he returned to New Orleans, where he was urged to resume his musical career. He joined his brother Percy's band and played on a few albums, including Jazz City Studio. He recorded his first sessions as bandleader in the mid-1960s; Igor's Imperial Orchestra (1966) and Earl Humphrey & His Feetwarmers (1967) on the Center label.

== Personal life ==
Earl died at his home in New Orleans in 1971 at the age of 68.
