= Crescent City Orchestra =

US jazz orchestra

Crescent City Orchestra was a semi-professional jazz symphonic orchestra in New Orleans, United States. It was set up by Jack Carey, a claimant to the authorship of the "Tiger Rag" tune, in 1913. In 1919 Carey was overtaken by Punch Miller. Another notable member was Jack Carey's brother, Thomas "Mutt" Carey.
