= Emanuel Paul =

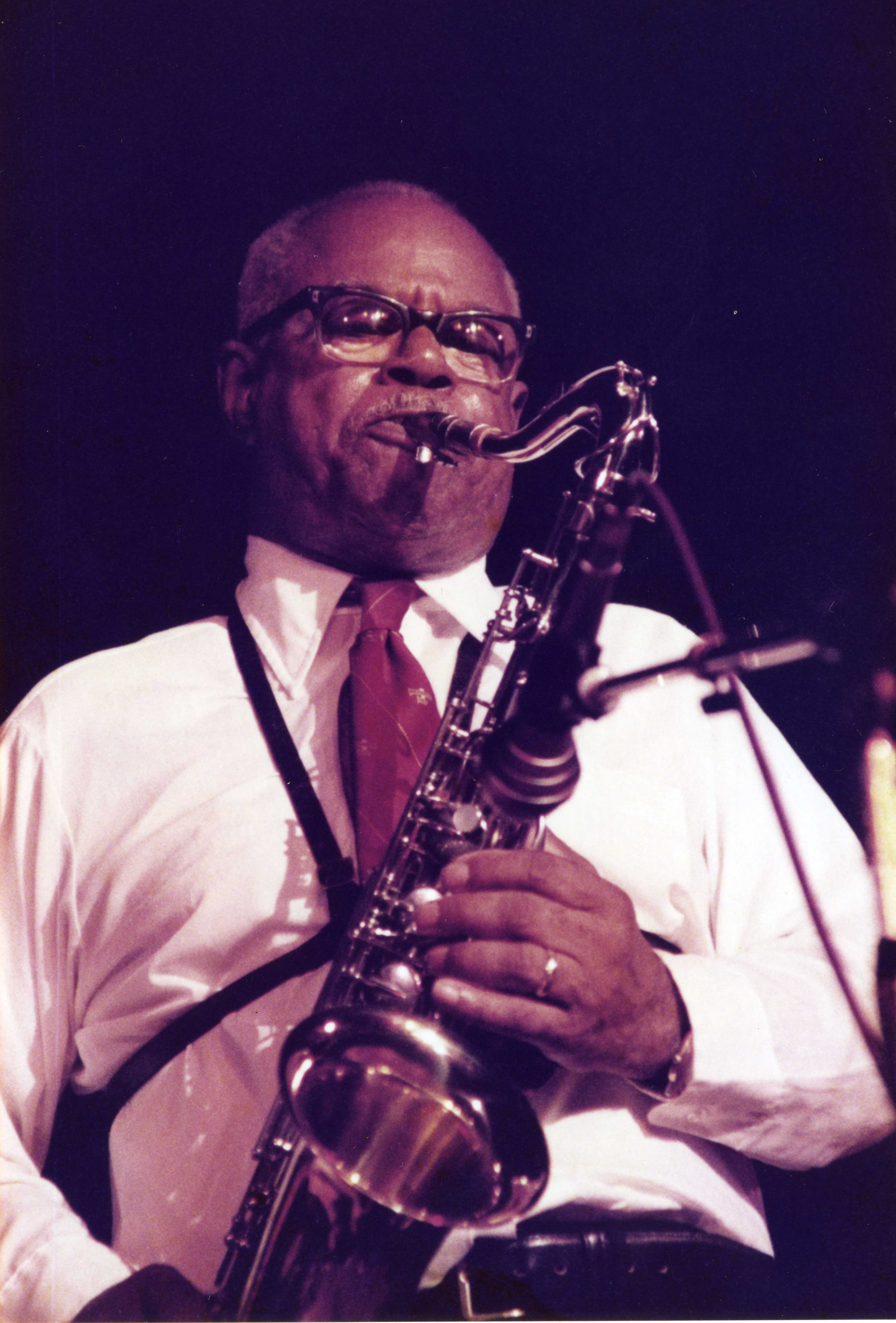

Background information
- Also known as: Manny
- Born: February 2, 1904; New Orleans, Louisiana, U.S.
- Died: May 23, 1988 (aged 84) New Orleans, Louisiana, U.S.
- Genres: New Orleans jazz
- Occupation: Saxophonist
- Instrument: Tenor saxophone
- Years active: 1935–1983
- Labels: GHB Records - Jazz Crusade Records - Icon Records - Nola Records - Arhoolie Records - Jazz Macon Club Records

Emanuel Paul (February 2, 1904 – May 23, 1988) was an American jazz tenor saxophonist.

Paul was one of the first tenor saxophonists to hold regular work in New Orleans jazz, where his instrument often substituted for the baritone horn in a brass band. Paul did not begin playing music until late in his youth, picking up violin at age 18 and then switching to banjo in the middle of the 1920s, before settling on tenor saxophone in the 1930s. He became a member of the Eureka Brass Band in 1940, and remained with them into the 1960s; he also played often with Kid Thomas Valentine from 1942, and recorded with Oscar Celestin, Emanuel Sayles, and the Olympia Brass Band. He led three albums for the European Jazz Macon label in 1967; his sidemen on these records included Valentine, George Lewis, and Butch Thompson.

JP Alessi of Lyon, France, released a CD entitled Blues for Manny in 2010.
