= Polo Barnes =

American jazz clarinetist and saxophonist (1901–1981)

- Born: Paul Barnes; November 22, 1901; New Orleans, Louisiana, U.S.
- Died: April 3, 1981 (aged 79) New Orleans, Louisiana, U.S.
- Genres: Jazz
- Instruments: Clarinet, saxophone

Paul D. "Polo" Barnes (November 22, 1901 – April 3, 1981, New Orleans) was an American jazz clarinetist and saxophonist. He was the brother of Emile Barnes and was a mainstay of the New Orleans jazz scene of the 1920s and 1930s.

== Career ==
Barnes attended St. Paul Lutheran School and began playing alto saxophone in 1919. He and banjoist Lawrence Marrero formed the Original Diamond Band, later known as the Young Tuxedo Band. He was with Kid Rena in 1922, the Maple Leaf Orchestra in 1923, and Papa Celestin's Original Tuxedo Band later that year; Celestin's group recorded his tune "My Josephine", which became quite popular. He played with Chick Webb in 1927, and with King Oliver three times (1927, 1931, 1934–35). He toured with Jelly Roll Morton in 1928-29.

In 1932 and 1933, Barnes led his own band. He also played with Chester Zardis (1935), and Kid Howard (1937–1939, 1941). He played in Algiers, Louisiana in a Navy band from 1942 to 1945, then returned to work with Celestin from 1946 to 1951. From 1952 to 1957, he left music and moved to California. Upon his return to New Orleans in 1959, he played with Paul Barbarin (1960), but from 1962 to 1965, joined the Young Men from New Orleans band that played on a riverboat at Disneyland. He returned again to New Orleans in 1964 and played at Preservation Hall and Dixieland Hall. He toured Europe in 1973 and 1974, but poor health ended his career in 1977.
