= Louis Nelson (trombonist) =

American jazz musician (1902–1990)

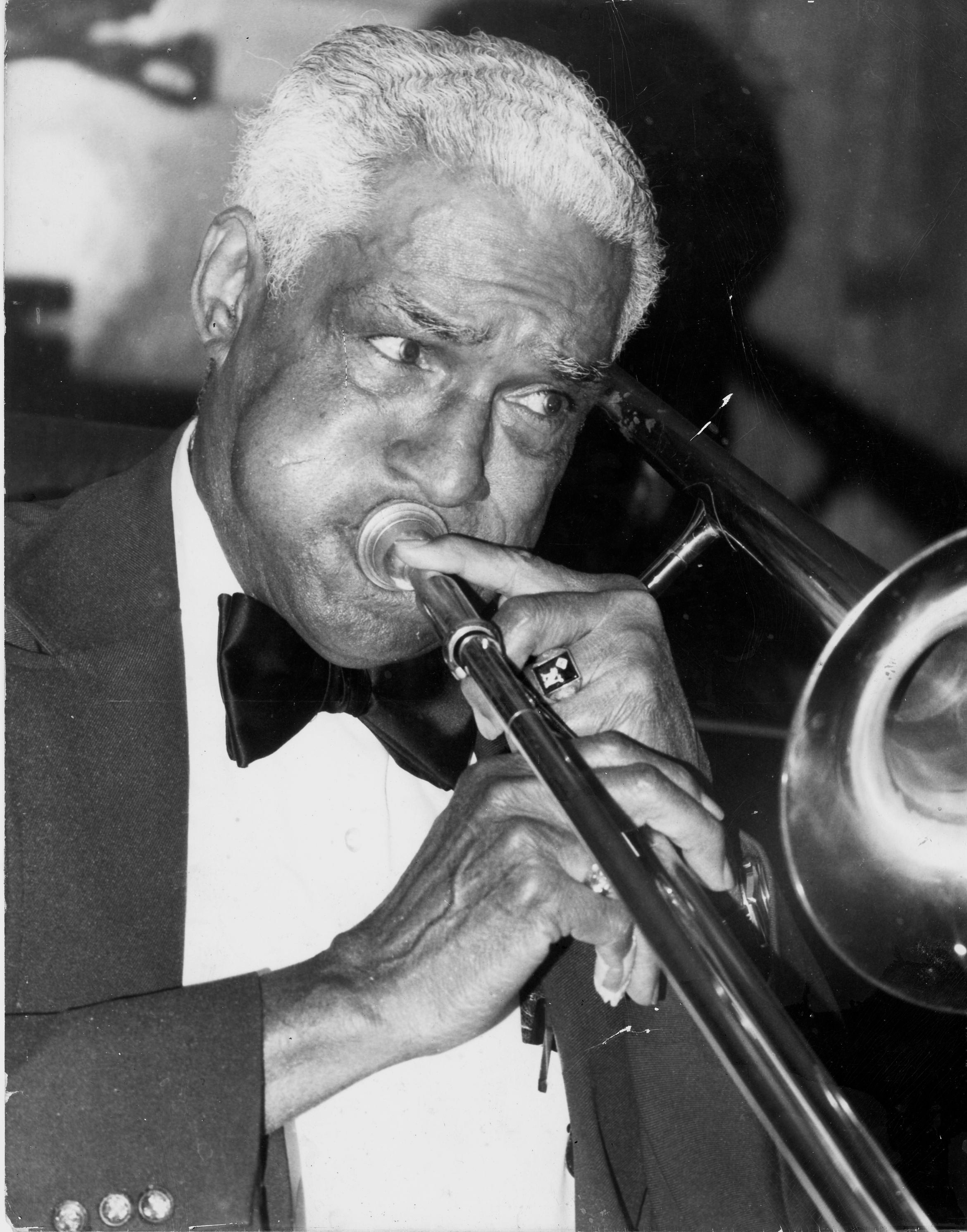
Nelson in 1981

Louis Hall Nelson (September 17, 1902 – April 5, 1990) was an American jazz trombonist.

== Life and career ==
Nelson was born on September 17, 1902, at 1419-21 Touro Street in New Orleans, Louisiana, United States. His father, Dr. George Harry Nelson, was a medical doctor. Dr. Nelson helped organize the 9th Louisiana Volunteers and served in the Spanish–American War. He was commissioned as first lieutenant. During the war he served in Cuba and also stormed San Juan Hill. His mother, Anna Hattie Adams Nelson, was a teacher and pianist from Springfield, Massachusetts. She was a descendant of runaway slaves from the Eastern Shore of Maryland. She was a graduate of the Boston Conservatory of Music. His mother moved to Louisiana to teach and this is where she met her husband. They had three children: Mary Nelson Welch, George Harry Nelson Jr., and Louis Hall Nelson. Both parents and his sister played the piano and his brother played the saxophone. In December 1902, his parents moved to Napoleonville, Louisiana, because his father could not get medical patients after the July 1900 Robert Charles Race Riots in New Orleans.

At the age of fifteen, while living in Napoleonville, Louis Nelson started playing the valve trombone and switched to the slide trombone, studying under Professor Claiborne Williams of Donaldsonville, Louisiana. He credited Professor Claiborne Williams with teaching him the proper way to breathe. Williams also taught him that technique and intuition were far more important than technical skill. Nelson is quoted as saying "I heard a fellow, Lawrence Johnson, playing with a band out of Napoleonville. I said, one day I'm going to play trombone like that man. He had a smooth tone, and gave the notes the full value. That's why I followed in his footsteps."

Weekdays, Louis Nelson lived with Reverend Isaac H. Hall in New Orleans, Louisiana. Reverend Hall was a family friend who had raised Nelson's father. While living there, Nelson attended the Lutheran School on Annette Street and New Orleans University (high school) on Saint Charles Avenue in New Orleans, being graduated in 1919.

Nelson's first band was Joe Gabriel's band of Thibodeaux, Louisiana. With Joe Gabriel's band, he traveled through Cajun country, playing in dance halls for a dollar a night.

Nelson married Julia Kissack in 1922. After a brief stay in New York City where he worked as a Pullman porter, Julia and Louis Nelson moved to New Orleans because she was ill. While in New Orleans in the 1920s, Nelson played jazz music with: Buddy Petit, Kid Rena, Kid Punch Miller, Sam Morgan, Chris Kelly, Papa Celestin, Willie Pajeaud, Kid Howard, Sidney Cates, and Kid Harris' Dixieland Band.

Louis and Julia Kissack Nelson had two children: Louis Hall Nelson Jr. and Anna Nelson Tircuit. Julia Kissack Nelson died in 1928 from complications of pregnancy. After his wife's death, Nelson joined the Sidney Desvigne Orchestra. This group played for white audiences in such spots as the New Orleans Country Club and the Southern Yacht Club. Monday and Tuesday nights were reserved for black audiences at such venues as the Pythian Temple and the Bulls Aids and Pleasure Club. During his 15 years with Desvigne's ten-piece Orchestra, Nelson played for summer Mississippi River cruises on the steamer S.S. Capitol, traveling as far north as Minneapolis and St. Paul, Minnesota.

To get work during the Depression, Nelson joined the Works Progress Administration and became first chair in the WPA band. Between engagements, the musicians dug stumps at City Park in New Orleans. When World War II commenced, Nelson volunteered for the U.S. Navy and became Musician First Class at the U.S. Navy base in Memphis, Tennessee. After serving in the Navy, Nelson returned to New Orleans and resumed playing with Sidney Desvigne's Orchestra until Desvigne moved it to California.

Nelson then joined the Kid Thomas Valentine band in 1945. With this band, he played one night a week at dance halls such as the Tip Top, Fireman's Hall in Westwego, Louisiana, and Speck's Moulin Rouge in Marrero, Louisiana. He also worked for the Herbert Leary Orchestra at this time. To make ends meet, Nelson was forced to take day jobs such as being a driver for the post office and for a fish merchant. He also worked as a chauffeur and as a janitor.

In 1949, Louis Nelson made his first recording with clarinetist and leader Big Eye Louis Nelson Delisle, as well as Charlie Love, Johnny St. Cyr, Ernest Rogers, and Austin Young at Dr. Nelson's Touro Street house. This recording, by jazz historian Bill Russell of AM Records, marked the beginning of an extensive recording career for Nelson.

In the 1950s, New Orleans French Quarter art gallery owner Larry Borenstein liked to go to the West Bank to hear the Kid Thomas Valentine band play in the evenings, but because he had to keep his art gallery at 726 Saint Peter Street open at night, his ability to hear jazz music was limited. As a result, Borenstein asked Kid Thomas Valentine to play jazz sessions, which he called "rehearsals", in order to avoid union trouble.

In 1961, Barbara Reed went to Baton Rouge to get a charter for an organization named The Society for the Preservation of Traditional New Orleans Jazz. This charter gave them a nonprofit corporate license status as they could not afford the entertainment tax when Reed and Grayson Mills, among others, officially opened Preservation Hall in 1961. Later that year, Allan Jaffe took over Preservation Hall. Nelson also played at the Paddock Lounge and later at Dixieland Hall, both on Bourbon Street.

Because of Preservation Hall, Nelson now had permanent work, exposure to a new audience, and was provided numerous opportunities for travel abroad as both a soloist and band member of the Billie and De De Pierce and Kid Thomas Valentine's bands. Noel Rockmore began his series of portraits of the musicians who played at the hall. Many adorned the hall, but jazz devotees who were art collectors such as John M. van Beuren (who maintained a residence in the building that housed the hall on the first floor), purchased the paintings for other residences, often in other parts of the country. van Beuren had a grand home built by Ludwig Mies van der Rohe in Morristown, New Jersey that had a living room large enough in which to hold private concerts while the band stayed at van Beuren's home when playing jigs in Manhattan. Two large Rockmore paintings, of Nelson and George Louis, dominated one end of that huge living room.

Louis Nelson toured extensively from 1963, beginning with the George Lewis band in Japan, Eastern, Western Europe, South America, Australia, Canada, and Mexico, as well as the United States, until his death in 1990.

Nelson appeared at every New Orleans Jazz and Heritage Festival until his death. He joined the Legends of Jazz. In 1981, Nelson received a grant from the National Endowment for the Arts where he developed a program in which he played for New Orleans public school students and discussed New Orleans jazz history.

On April 5, 1990, Nelson died of injuries suffered from a March 27 hit-and-run automobile accident. The driver was never caught.

Widely recorded, including music for the movie Pretty Baby starring Brooke Shields, Nelson also appeared in many New Orleans jazz documentaries, including Art Ford's House Party, Live the Jazz, Three Men of Jazz, and Till the Butcher Cut Him Down.
