= Willie Humphrey =

Musical artist (1900–1994)

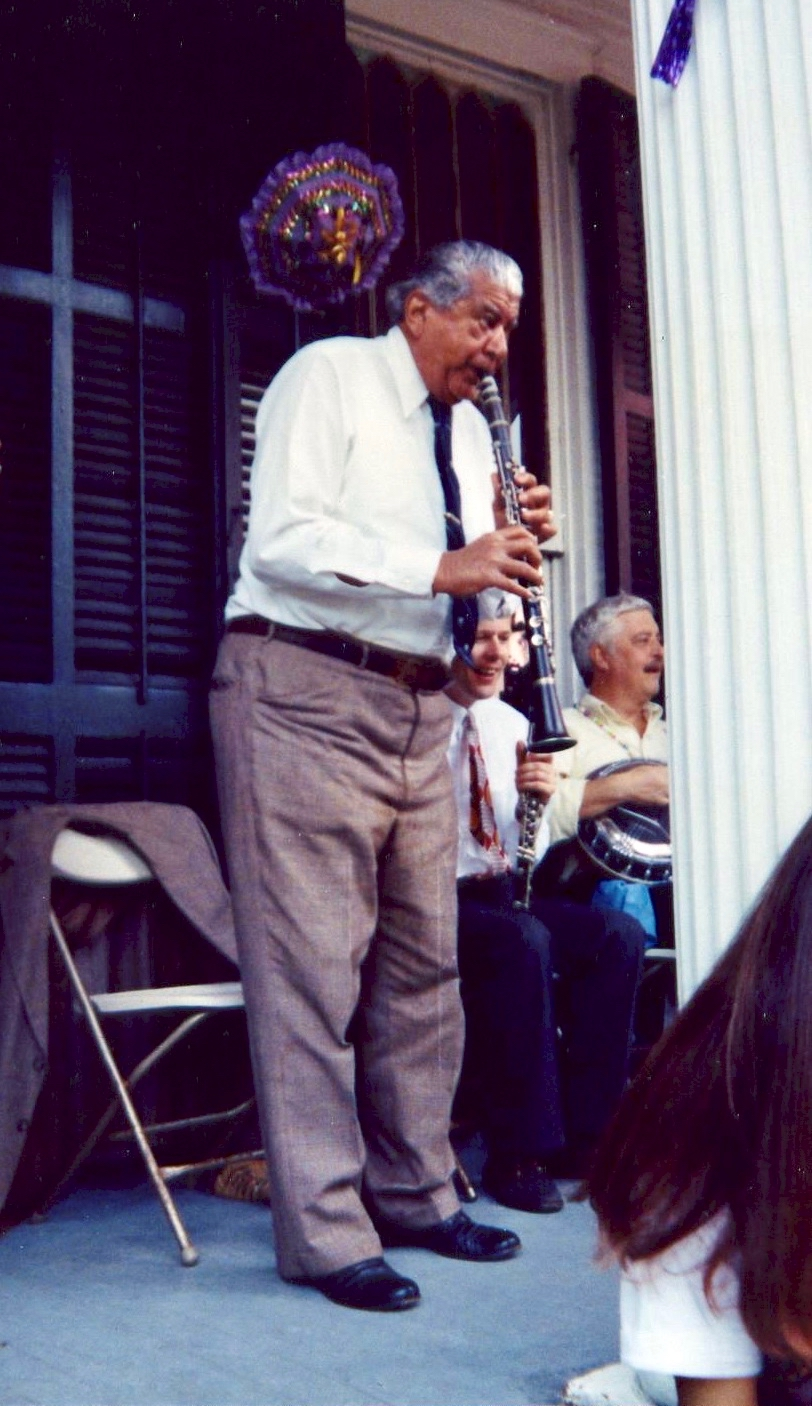
- Humphrey at the start of the 1990s

Background information
- Birth name: Willie James Humphrey
- Born: December 29, 1900
- Origin: New Orleans, Louisiana, U.S.
- Died: June 7, 1994 (aged 93); New Orleans, Louisiana, U.S.
- Genres: Traditional jazz
- Instrument: Clarinet
- Formerly of: Preservation Hall Jazz Band, Eureka Brass Band

Willie James Humphrey (December 29, 1900 – June 7, 1994) was a New Orleans jazz clarinetist. Willie Humphrey was born in a musical family, the son of prominent local clarinetist and music teacher Willie Eli Humphrey; his brothers Earl Humphrey and Percy Humphrey also became well known professional musicians.

After establishing himself with such New Orleans bands as the Excelsior and George McCullum's band, Humphrey traveled up north, playing with such other New Orleans musicians as Lawrence Duhé, and King Oliver in Chicago (Photos show Humphrey with Duhé's band playing in the stands for the 1919 World Series). In Saint Louis, Missouri in the 1920s he made his first recordings.

Back in New Orleans, he played for many years with the Eureka and Young Tuxedo Brass bands, the bands of Paul Barbarin and Sweet Emma Barrett, and the Preservation Hall Jazz Band.

Humphrey's clarinet playing remained vigorous and continued to grow more inventive in his old age.

He died at his home in New Orleans on June 7, 1994.

== Selected discography ==
- Best of Preservation Hall Jazz Band (recordings 1976–1988), Columbia, 1989
- New Orleans Traditional Legends, vol. 2 (recordings 1974 and 1983), Mardi Gras, 1993
- Two Clarinets on the Porch, GHB, 1991
- A Kiss to Build a Dream on, GHB, 1999
- Meets the Maryland Jazz Band of Cologne, GHB, 1999
