= Kid Shots Madison =

American jazz musician

Louis "Kid Shots" Madison (19 February 1899, New Orleans – September 1948, New Orleans) was an American jazz cornetist.

== Biography ==
Madison was born in New Orleans on 19 February 1899. He studied cornet under David Jones, Louis Dumaine, and Joe Howard. In 1915, he was the drummer in the Colored Waif's Home band with Louis Armstrong. In 1923, he played second cornet with the Tuxedo Brass Band. During the 1930s, he played with the WPA brass band. In the 1940s, he played with the New Orleans Eureka Brass Band.

In January 1948, Madison suffered from a stroke and died eight months later.
