= Jim Robinson (trombonist) =

American jazz musician

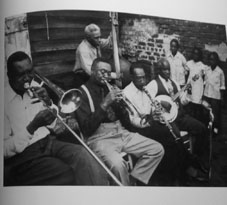
- Robinson (left) in June 1950

Background information
- Also known as: Big Jim Robinson
- Born: Nathan Robinson; December 25, 1890; Plaquemines Parish, Louisiana, U.S.
- Died: May 4, 1976 (aged 85] New Orleans, Louisiana, U.S.
- Genre: Jazz
- Instruments: Trombone

Big Jim Robinson (born Nathan; December 25, 1890 – May 4, 1976) was an American jazz musician, based in New Orleans, renowned for his deep, wide-toned, robust "tailgate" style of trombone playing, using the slide to achieve a wide swoop between two notes ("glissando") and rhythmic effects.

== Biography ==
Born Nathan Robinson in Deer Range, a small settlement on the west bank of lower Plaquemines Parish, Louisiana, Robinson studied music under James Brown Humphrey.

Robinson arrived in New Orleans looking for work shortly before the 1915 New Orleans hurricane, which wiped out his home town of Deer Range, and prompted Robinson to settle in the city. In his youth, he got the nickname "Jim Crow" because of his facial features, which resembled a Native American. He was playing semi-professionally in his twenties, from World War I on. In the 1920s, he made his first recordings as a member of the Sam Morgan Jazz Band. He gained greater fame with the resurgence of interest in early New Orleans jazz starting in the 1940s as a regular member of the bands of Bunk Johnson and George Lewis. Occasionally, he also led his own band and appeared regularly at Preservation Hall in his later years.

Robinson's widely-recognized style was influential with many later traditional and New Orleans-style jazz trombonists in the United States and Europe. California trombonist Frank Demond assimilated Robinson’s style, and took his place in the Preservation Hall groups after Robinson’s death. Robinson also tutored Big Bill Bissonnette.

Robinson's signature tune, "Ice Cream", was requested at almost all personal appearances after his virtuoso performance of the number in an American Music Records recording made in the 1940s. He also was known for promoting audience participation—especially encouraging dancing whenever feasible.

Jim Robinson died of cancer at the Touro Infirmary in New Orleans.

== Discography ==
- New Orleans: The Living Legends (Riverside)
- Classic New Orleans Jazz Vol. 2 From The Rare Center Series (Biograph, 1993, 2007)
