= Emanuel Sayles =

American jazz banjoist (1907–1986)

Emanuel Sayles (January 31, 1907 – October 5, 1986) was an American jazz banjoist chiefly active in the New Orleans jazz scene.

== Biography ==
Sayles was born in Donaldsonville, Louisiana and played violin and viola as a child, then taught himself banjo and guitar. He was raised Catholic.

He went to high school in Pensacola, Florida, then relocated to New Orleans and played with William Ridgely's Tuxedo Orchestra. Following this he worked with Fate Marable, Armand Piron, and Sidney Desvigne on riverboats up and down the Mississippi River. In 1929 he participated in recordings with the Jones-Collins Astoria Hot Eight.

Sayles moved to Chicago in 1933, where he led his own group and worked often as an accompanist on blues and jazz recordings with Roosevelt Sykes and others. He returned to New Orleans in 1949, playing with George Lewis (with whom he toured Japan in 1963–64) and Sweet Emma Barrett. He played with Punch Miller in Cleveland in 1960, then played again in Chicago in the house band at the Jazz, Ltd. club from 1965 to 1967. Returning once more to New Orleans in 1968, he played with the Preservation Hall Jazz Band.

Sayles also recorded with Peter Bocage, Kid Thomas Valentine, Earl Hines, and Louis Cottrell, Jr. He recorded extensively as a leader in the 1960s for GHB, Nobility, Dixie, and Big Lou.

He died in 1986.
