= Alton Purnell =

American jazz musician

Alton Purnell (April 16, 1911 – January 14, 1987) was an American jazz pianist. He was a longtime performer in Dixieland jazz.

== Early life ==
Purnell was born in New Orleans on April 16, 1911. His brother, Theodore, became a reed player.

== Later life and career ==
Purnell sang before playing piano professionally, beginning to do so locally in New Orleans in 1928. He played in the 1930s with Isaiah Morgan, Alphonse Picou, Big Eye Louis Nelson, Sidney Desvigne, and Cousin Joe, and with Bunk Johnson in the middle of the 1940s. Purnell joined George Lewis's band after Johnson's broke up in 1946, and remained there well into the 1950s, including for international tours.

In 1957 Purnell relocated to Los Angeles. There he worked with Teddy Buckner, Young Men from New Orleans, Joe Darensbourg, Kid Ory, Barney Bigard, and Ben Pollack. He also recorded extensively as a leader, including for Warner Bros. Records, GHB, and Alligator Jazz. He toured internationally as a guest soloist from 1964. Purnell died in Inglewood, California on January 14, 1987.
