= Jack Carey (musician) =

American jazz musician (1889–1934)

- Born: 1889; Hahnville, Louisiana, U.S.
- Died: 1934 (aged 44–45)
- Genres: Jazz
- Instrument: Trombone

Jack Carey (1889 – 1934) was an American jazz trombonist and the leader of the Crescent City Orchestra. The authorship of the famous Tiger Rag tune is attributed to him by some. During his career, he performed with Sidney Bechet. Carey was the older brother of Mutt Carey.
