= Barry Martyn =

English jazz drummer (1941–2023)

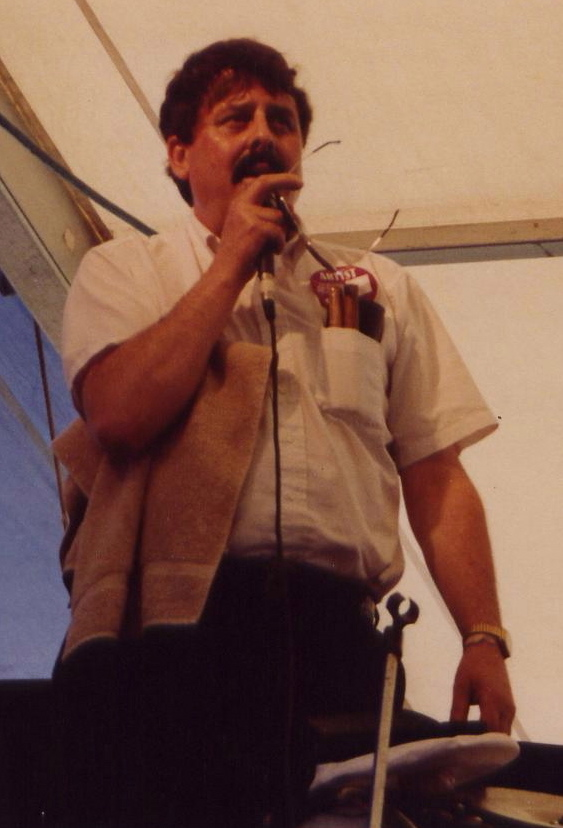
Martyn at the New Orleans Jazz & Heritage Festival

Barry Martyn (born Barry Martyn Godfrey; 23 February 1941 – 17 July 2023) was an English jazz drummer, active principally on the New Orleans jazz revival circuit.

== Biography ==
Barry Martyn Godfrey was born on 23 February 1941. He began on drums in 1955 and was leading his first band the following year. His first recordings were made in 1959. His first visit to New Orleans was in 1961, where he studied under Cie Frazier, and founded Mono Records. He toured Europe with many famed New Orleans jazz personnel, including George Lewis, Albert Nicholas, Louis Nelson, Captain John Handy, and Percy Humphrey. He moved to Los Angeles in 1972, and founded the Legends of Jazz, an ensemble which made several worldwide tours and recorded extensively. He returned to New Orleans in 1984, where he did work with George Buck, reissuing much of the Circle Records back catalogue. He played with Barney Bigard in 1976, and recorded many dates as a leader. Martyn died on 17 July 2023, at the age of 82.

== Bibliography ==
- Walking with Legends: Barry Martyn's New Orleans Jazz Odyssey. Edited by Mick Burns. Louisiana State University Press. 2007. ISBN 978-0-8071-3276-0.
