= Kid Sheik =

American jazz musician

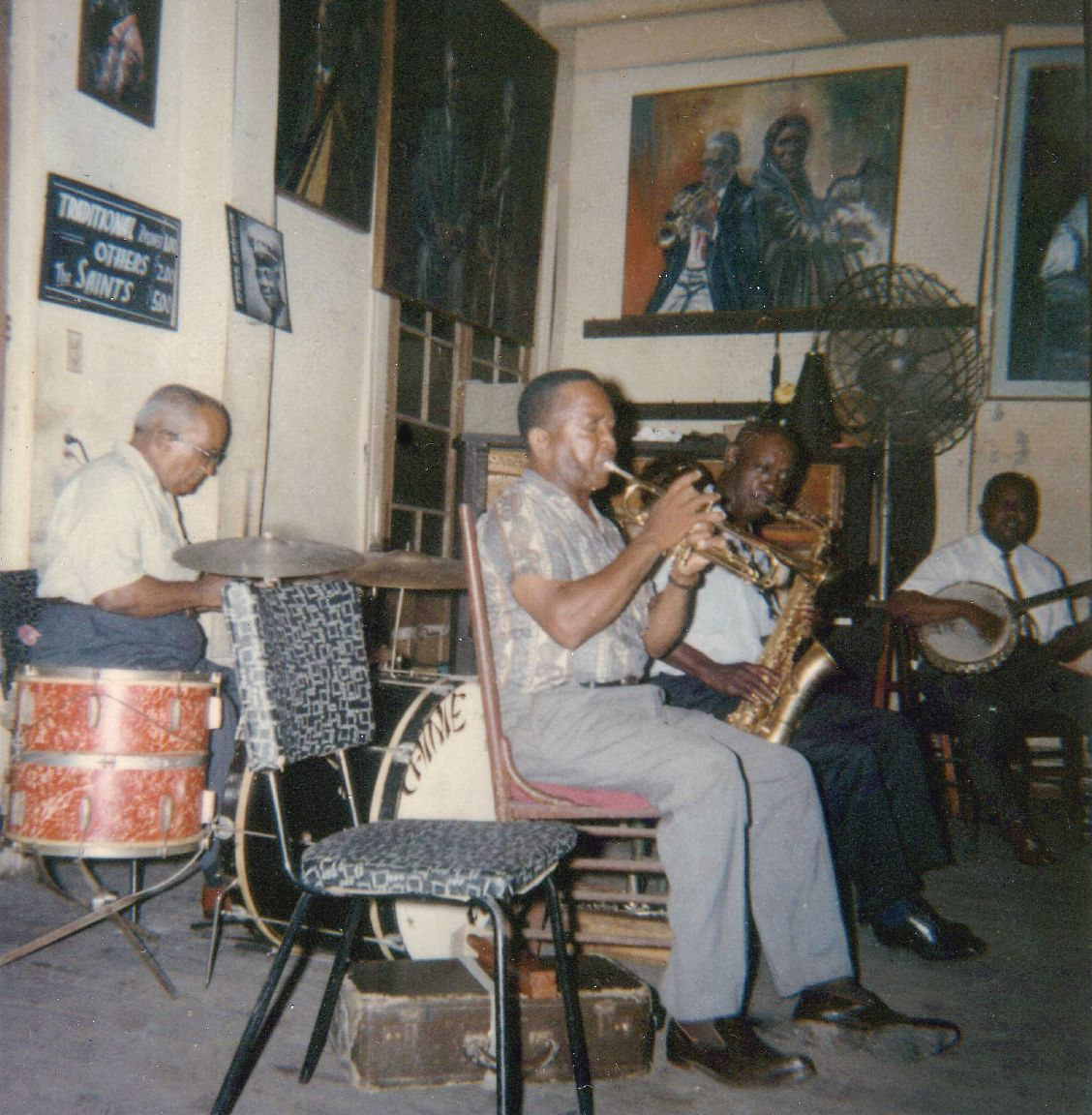
Kid Sheik Colar on trumpet with Captain John Handy on saxophone, Preservation Hall, 1965

George Colar (September 15, 1908 – November 7, 1996), actually Cola but he used Colar, better known as Kid Sheik or Kid Sheik Cola, was a New Orleans jazz trumpeter and band leader. He is most associated with Dixieland jazz and was a long-term performer with the Preservation Hall Jazz Band. His nickname "Kid Sheik" came from his chic style of clothing as he wore sheik suites as a young man.

Cola started playing the trumpet at age 16 where he took informal lessons from Wooden Joe Nicholas. As a young musician, Cola idolized Chris Kelley and he would follow him around. His technique of playing was retrieved from Joe who was like his mentor, but his style of playing was from Chris who was his idol. At age 18(1925), Cola briefly had a band of his own where they would play in and around the New Orleans area (formerly Storyville) for 18 years(1943).

For jazz, the 1930's was a difficult time. "The thirties were empty" where little to no one would play or listen to music since money was rough. Aside from the Eureka brass band, many brass bands were disappearing as musicians would lose track of other musicians contact with money and jobs being hard to find. But for Cola, when he wasn't playing trumpet, he was spending his spare time sewing sacks that would soon contain sugar.

In 1943, Sheik enlisted in the air force where he attended the air force school of music and led a small group until 1945. After his time in the air force, he worked with George Lewis in the late 1940s before joining the Eureka Brass Band, replacing Eddie Richardson on second, along with joining the Olympia Brass Band, both of which he joined in 1952 and was a member until the 90's while still having his side gigs. Backtracking to the 1940's, they became a time of recording and "revival". Jazz was reaching enthusiastic audiences in the US and Europe however, more commercialized music was being requested rather than the traditional music since they played in music halls that were restricted to white audiences. For Sheik however, the time of recording for him came in the 60's. Sheik recorded his first recording in 1961, some of his recording's being with the bands he was in and some on his own.

Not only was Sheik recording in the 60's, but he was also touring. Sheik had toured England with Barry Martyn's band in 1963, Europe (1966) and New York (1968) with Captain John Handy, and Japan with Louis Nelson in 1970. As the 70's and 80's approached, Cola continued touring on his own and with other bands along with playing at Preservation Hall in New Orleans. In his later years (1985), he married pianist and singer Sadie Goodson who he also played with in duos and ensembles in New Orleans.

Kid Sheik was the subject of the official New Orleans Jazz & Heritage Festival poster in 1990. He is also featured in a 35mm twelve-minute black and white film directed by Frank Decola titled "The Cradle Is Rocking". A 35mm print and a negative of that print is in the Folkstreams Collection in the Southern Folklife Collection of the Wilson Library at the University of North Carolina in Chapel Hill. The film is available for streaming on Folkstreams.net.

Some examples of Kid Sheiks style of playing as a lead and soloist are shown in the album "Kid Martyn in New Orleans with Kid Sheik's Band" (1963).
