= Kid Howard =

American jazz musician (1908–1966)

Avery "Kid" Howard (April 22, 1908, New Orleans, Louisiana - March 28, 1966, New Orleans) was an American jazz trumpeter, associated with the New Orleans jazz scene.

Howard began on drums at about age fourteen, but switched to cornet and then trumpet after playing with Chris Kelly. In New Orleans, he played in the 1920s with the Eureka Brass Band, Allen's Brass Band, and the Tuxedo Brass Band. He led his own bands late in the 1920s and early in the 1930s; it was his band which played at the jazz funeral for Buddy Petit. He played in the Palace Theatre pit orchestra from 1938 to 1943. In 1943, he recorded with George Lewis, considered to be among his best recordings. In 1946, he led the Original Zenith Brass Band, but played only locally for the next few years. In 1952 he returned to playing with Lewis, where he would remain until 1961. His later recordings with Lewis are uneven because he was battling with alcoholism, which interfered with his abilities as a soloist. He fell ill in 1961 and left Lewis's band, and upon his recovery he led his own band from 1961 to 1965 and recorded several times; these recordings were also highly praised.

He continued to play in New Orleans at Preservation Hall and other venues up until his death of a brain hemorrhage in 1966.

== Discography ==
- Kid Howard and His La Vida Jazz Band (1961, Icon Records)
- "Kid" Howard And His New Orleans Jazz Band At Zion Hill Church (1965, Nobility Recording Co.)
