= Bunk Johnson =

American jazz trumpeter (1889–1949)

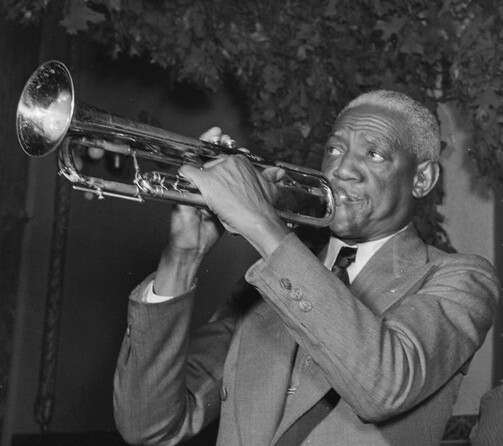
- Johnson in 1946

Background information
- Also known as: Bunk
- Born: William Gary Johnson; December 27, 1889; New Orleans, Louisiana, U.S.
- Died: July 7, 1949 (aged 59) New Iberia, Louisiana, U.S.
- Genre: Jazz
- Instrument: Trumpet
- Years active: 1905–1947
- Formerly of: Bunk Johnson & His New Orleans Jazz Band, George Lewis, Louis Armstrong

Willie Gary "Bunk" Johnson (December 27, 1889 – July 7, 1949) was an American prominent jazz trumpeter from New Orleans.

== Early life and education ==
Johnson gave the year of his birth as 1879, although Johnson stated on his 1937 application for Social Security that he was born on December 27, 1889 and there is speculation that he may have been younger by as much as a decade. According to jazz critic Scott Yanow, Johnson was probably born at the 1889 date.

Johnson was the youngest of 14 children. He had been schooled in sight reading and improvisation by the time he began playing professionally with the Superior Orchestra and the Eagle Band in 1910. He claimed to have attended New Orleans University, although no diploma from the college survives.

Johnson received lessons from Adam Olivier and began playing professionally in Olivier's orchestra. Johnson probably played a few adolescent jobs with Buddy Bolden, but was not a regular member of Bolden's Band (contrary to Johnson's claim). Johnson was regarded as one of the leading trumpeters in New Orleans in the years 1905–1915, in between repeatedly leaving the city to tour with minstrel shows and circus bands.

== Career ==
After he failed to appear for a New Orleans Mardi Gras parade job in 1915, he learned that krewe members intended to do him bodily harm. So he left town, touring with shows and then by the early 1920s settling in New Iberia, Louisiana. While living in New Iberia, Johnson worked in rice mills and the public school system, and continued playing jazz, but with local groups such as the Black Eagle Band from Crowley and the Banner Orchestra.

In 1931, he lost his trumpet and front teeth when a fight broke out at a dance in Rayne, Louisiana, putting an end to his playing. He thereafter worked in manual labor, occasionally giving music lessons.

=== Career revival and first recordings ===
In 1938 and 1939, the writers of an early jazz history book, Jazzmen, interviewed several prominent musicians of the time, including Louis Armstrong, Sidney Bechet, and Clarence Williams, who spoke highly of Johnson in the old days in New Orleans. The writers tracked down Johnson's address, and traded several letters with him, where he recalled (and possibly embellished) his early career. Johnson stated that he could play again if he only had new teeth and a new trumpet. A collection was taken up by writers and musicians, and he was fitted with a set of dentures by Bechet's dentist brother, Leonard, and given a new trumpet. He made his first recordings in 1942, for Jazz Man Records.

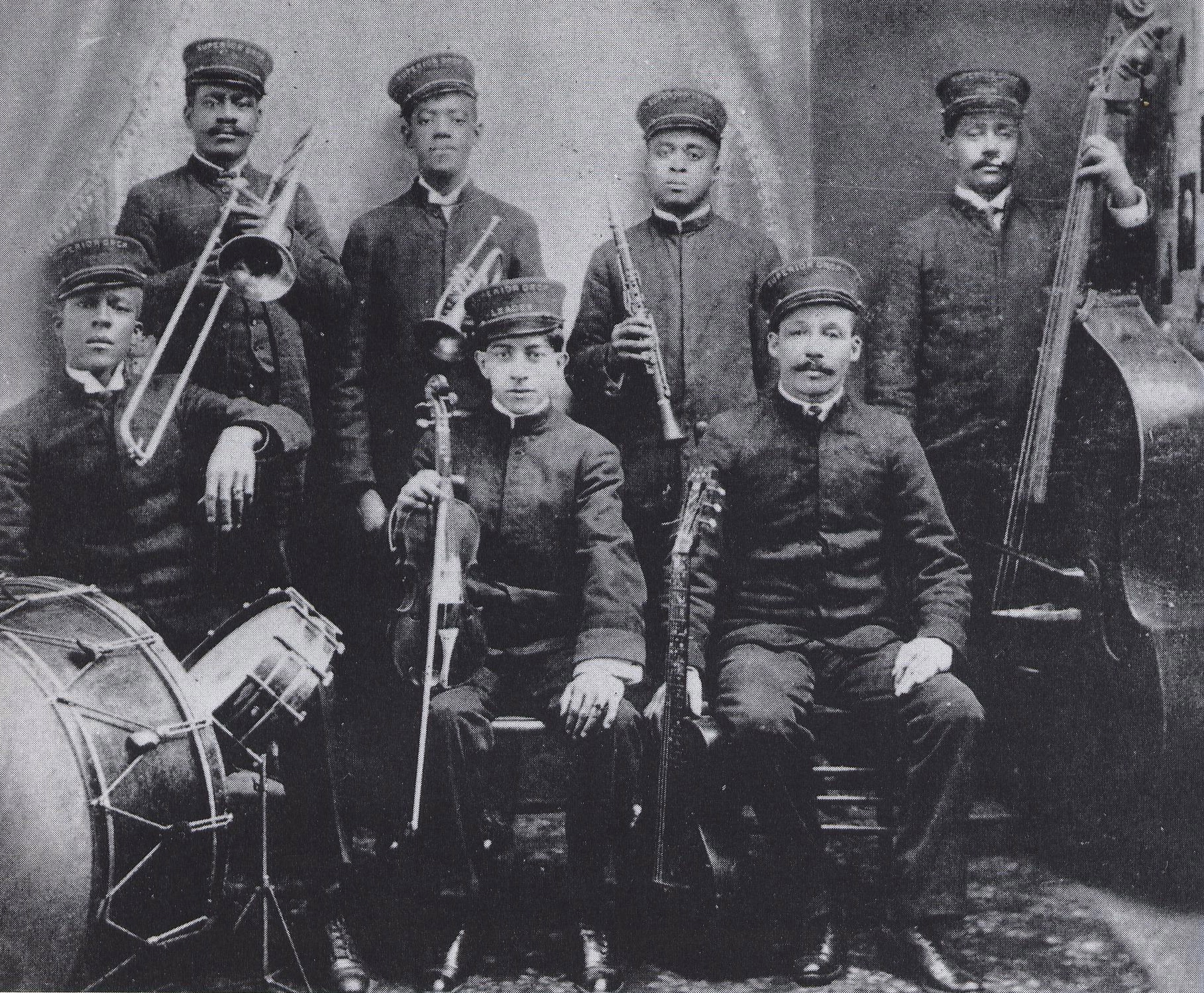
The Superior Orchestra, 1910

=== Later touring career ===
These first recordings propelled Johnson (along with clarinetist George Lewis) into public attention. Johnson and his band played in New Orleans, San Francisco, Boston, and New York City and made many more recordings. Johnson's work in the 1940s shows why he was well regarded by his fellow musicians. On his best days he played with great imagination, subtlety, and beauty, as well as suggesting why he had not gained prominence earlier, for he was unpredictable, temperamental, with a passive-aggressive streak and a fondness for drinking alcohol to the point of impairment.

== Death and legacy ==
Johnson suffered from a stroke in late 1948 and died in New Iberia the following year.

Jazz historians have debated Johnson's legacy, and the extent to which his colorful reminiscences of his early career were accurate, misremembered, exaggerated, or untrue. Although in recent years, new evidence has appeared in jazz historian Vic Hobson's 2014 Creating Jazz Counterpoint. New Orleans, Barbershop Harmony, and the Blues, in which is stated that Buddy Bolden's band member Willy Cornish — who is seen on the only surviving picture of the Bolden Band — affirmed Bunk Johnson as a member of the early jazz group. This puts Johnson's own statements and recordings, in which he actively recreated the Bolden tunes, in a plausible and positive light, making them of great historical and musicological importance to the study of jazz and New Orleans jazz in particular.

His recordings have been reissued on CD.

Johnson was a Catholic, and as of 2019 an annual Jazz Mass and procession was conducted in his hometown of New Iberia, beginning at St Edward Catholic Church and ending at Johnson's gravesite.

In about 1996, Bunk Johnson Park was dedicated to his memory in New Iberia, Louisiana. Twenty years later, in 2016, the park was dismantled due to criminal activity in the area.

The Iberia Parish Library hosts an archival collection of Johnson's papers and a special exhibit room for Johnson.

== Selected discography ==
- 1942.06 - and released on Jazz Man Records.
- "Down By The River / Panama": Jazz Man 8. Recorded in New Orleans, 1942.
- "Weary Blues / Moose March": Jazz Man 9. Recorded in New Orleans, 1942.
- "Storyville Blues / Bunk's Blues": Jazz Man 10. Recorded in New Orleans, 1942.
- 1942.10 - The Complete Jazz Information Recordings (American Music AMCD-119, 2005). Originally released on Milt Gabler's Jazz Information label, distributed by Commodore Records.
- 1943-44 - In San Francisco (American Music AMCD16, 1994)
- 1944 - The King Of The Blues (American Music AMCD-1, 1989-2016). Recorded in New Orleans in July and August 1944.
- 1945 - Bunk's Brass Band & 1945 Sessions (American Music AMCD-6, 1992) Bunk's Brass Band And Dance Band Recorded in New Orleans in May 14, 17 and 18 1945.
- 1944.08-1945 - Bunk Plays The Blues And Spirituals (American Music 638) (10-inch LP). Recorded in New Orleans. Includes recordings by Johnson's working band (August 1944) and a brass band (May, 1945).
- 1944-45 - Bunk Johnson -1944/45 (American Music AMCD-12, 1993)
- 1945-1946 - (American Music 644) (10-inch LP). Recorded in New Orleans, May 1945, and New York, June 1946. Includes recordings by Johnson's working band (1945) and a trio featuring Don Ewell (1946).
- 1944.08 - New Orleans 1944 (American Music 647) (10-inch LP). Recorded in New Orleans.
- 1943-1945 - Rare And Unissued Masters, Volume 1 (1943-1945) (American Music AMCD-13, ?9) CD; reissued as Org Music ORGM-2101 on LP for Record Store Day 2018. Includes further recordings by Johnson's working band (July–August 1944; May 1945) and Johnson's brass band (May, 1945); also includes duets with pianist Bertha Gonsoulin recorded in San Francisco, May 1943.
- 1943-1946 - Rare And Unissued Masters Volume Two (1943-1946) (American Music AMCD-140, 2018)
- 1944.01-02 - Spirituals & Jazz - (Good Time Jazz L-17) Bunk Johnson and the Yerba Buena Jazz Band .Recorded in San Francisco.
- 1945.03 - Days Beyond Recall (Blue Note BLP 7008) Sidney Bechet and Bunk Johnson: Recorded in New York.
- 1945.12 - Hot Jazz (RCA Victor HJ-7). Album of four 78 rpm shellac records; recorded in New York.
- 1945.11 - The Complete Decca Session (American Music AMCD-116, 2005) Bunk Johnson And His New Orleans Band. Contains all the recorded takes with false starts
- The same as: New Orleans Memories (Ace of Hearts AH 140). 12-inch LP, with the four master tracks of the Decca session in New York, plus recordings by Kid Ory and George Lewis.
- 1947 - Minneapolis Concert 1947 With Doc Evans Band (American Music AMCD-129, 2010) Bunk Johnson & Don Ewell
- 1947.09 - At New York Town Hall 1947 (American Music AMCD-46, 1993) Bunk Johnson and Leadbelly
- 1947.10 - In New York 1947 (American Music AMCD-45, 1993) Bunk Johnson & Mutt Carey. Seven tracks with Bunk Johnson recorded live at Caravan Ballroom, 110 East 59th Street, N.Y.C. in 1947
- 1947.12 - The Last Testament Of A Great New Orleans Jazzman ( Columbia CL 829). 12-inch LP, recorded at Carnegie Recital Hall, New York City. Bunk Johnson's final recordings
