= Percy Humphrey =

American jazz musician (1905–1995)

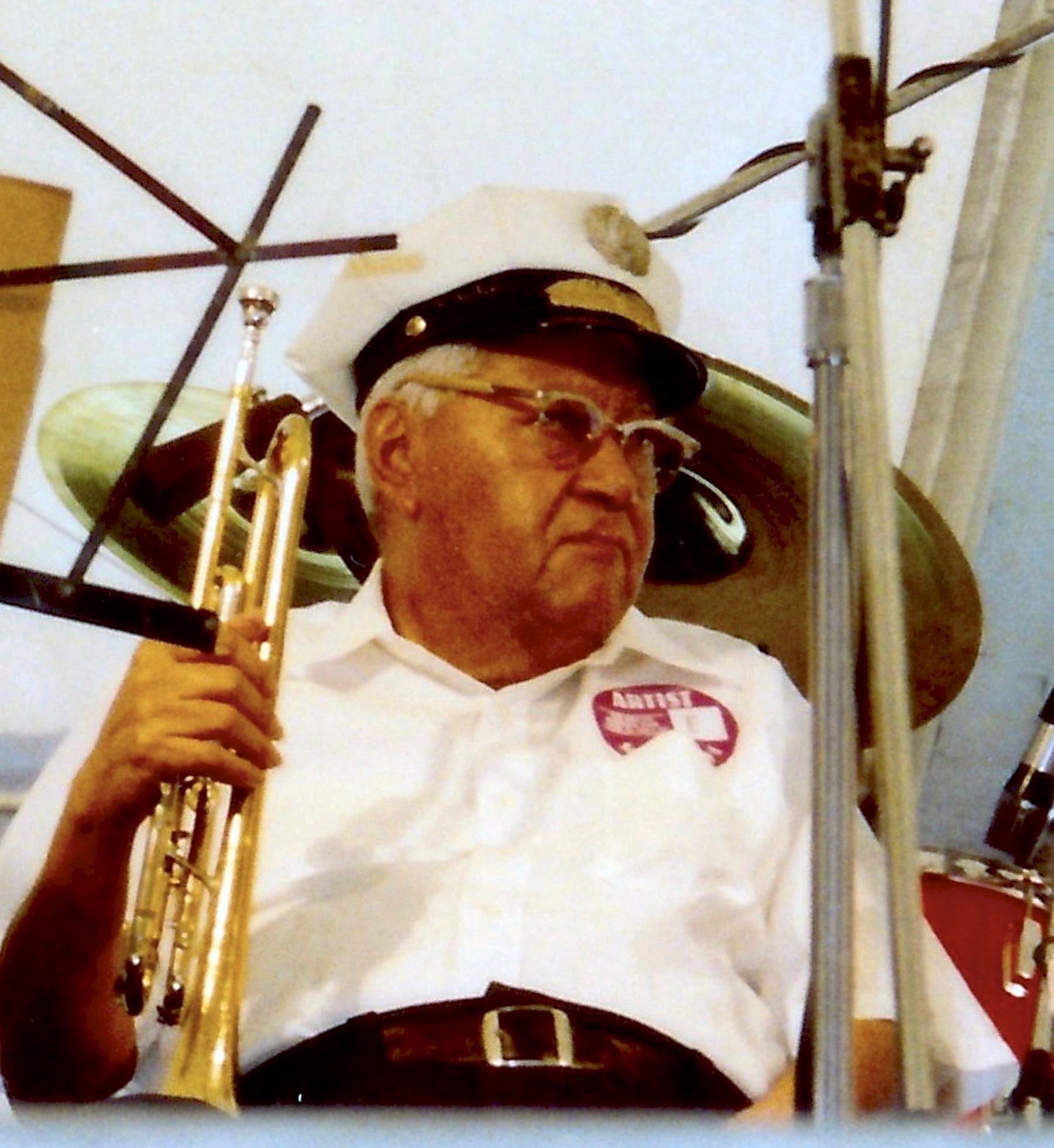
- Percy Humphrey, trumpeter and leader of New Orleans jazz bands

Background information
- Birth name: Percy Gaston Humphrey
- Born: January 13, 1905; New Orleans, Louisiana, U.S.
- Died: July 22, 1995 (aged 90); New Orleans
- Genres: Jazz, dixieland
- Occupation: Musician
- Instrument: Trumpet
- Formerly of: Eureka Brass Band, Preservation Hall Jazz Band

Percy Gaston Humphrey (January 13, 1905 – July 22, 1995) was an American jazz trumpeter and bandleader in New Orleans, Louisiana.

In addition to his band, Percy Humphrey and His Crescent City Joymakers, for more than thirty years he was leader of the Eureka Brass Band. He also played in the band of the pianist Sweet Emma Barrett. From its opening in the early 1960s until shortly before his death, Humphrey played often at Preservation Hall, traveling internationally for performances with the Preservation Hall Jazz Band and his own bands.

Percy Humphrey was the younger brother of clarinetist Willie Humphrey and trombonist Earl Humphrey. His father was clarinetist Willie Eli Humphrey. His grandfather was "Professor" Jim Humphrey, who took the train from New Orleans to sugar cane plantations during the 1890s to teach music to children of plantation workers.

== Leader of Eureka Brass Band (1946-1975) ==
The Eureka Brass Band was founded in 1920 by trumpeter Willie Wilson. The band's members included clarinetists Willie Parker, John Casimir, and George Lewis. Humphrey took over the band in 1946 and led the group for the remainder of its existence. The members of the band varied, usually having nine to eleven members. Typical instrumentation was three trumpets, two trombones, two reeds, tuba, snare drum, and bass drum. Reed instruments were many, including the saxophones that often are found among jazz bands, but the clarinet is characteristically the signature reed instrument of New Orleans jazz.

They recorded prolifically, for such labels as Pax, Alamac, Folkways, Jazzology, and Sounds of New Orleans. A 1951 album, New Orleans Parade, features Humphrey, trombonists Charles "Sunny" Henry and Albert Warner, and saxophonist Emanuel Paul. Their 1962 sessions, Jazz at Preservation Hall, Volume 1: the Eureka Brass Band of New Orleans, issued on Atlantic Records, features Humphrey and his brother, Willie, trumpeters Kid Sheik Cola and Peter Bocage, trombonists Albert Warner and Oscar "Chicken" Henry, Emanuel Paul on tenor saxophone, Wilbert "Bird" Tillman on sousaphone, snare drummer Cie Frazier, and bass drummer Robert "Son Fewclothes" Lewis.

The Eureka Brass Band disbanded in 1975, but Humphrey subsequently revived the name for festival performances and other appearances. He continued to lead his own band and perform at Preservation Hall until his death in New Orleans in 1995. His last performance was at the annual New Orleans jazz festival in April, three months before his death at the age of ninety.

== Discography ==
- 1953 Percy Humphrey at Manny's Tavern (Biograph)
- 1954 Sounds of New Orleans, Vol. 1: Paul Barbarin & His Band/Percy Humphrey's Jam Session (Storyville)
- 1961 Percy Humphrey's Crescent City Joymakers (Riverside)
- 1965 Climax Rag (Delmark)
- 1972 New Orleans to Scandinavia (SLP)
- 1972 A Portrait of Percy Humphrey (Storyville)
- 1974 Living New Orleans Jazz (Smokey Mary)
- 1995 Jazz in Schloss Gracht (GHB)
- 1995 Hot Six (GHB)
- 1996 Percy Humphrey & Paul Barbarin (American Recordings)
- 2000 In Italy (GHB)
- 2014 Percy Humphrey and the New Orleans Joymakers (GHB)
