= Kid Rena =

American jazz trumpeter (1898–1949)

Henry "Kid" Rena (August 30, 1898 – April 25, 1949) was an American jazz trumpeter, who was an early star of the New Orleans jazz scene.

== Biography ==
He was born in New Orleans, Louisiana, United States.

Rena may have taken lessons from Manuel Perez as a youngster. He and Louis Armstrong played in the same waif's home band, and when Armstrong joined the band on the S.S. Capitol, Rena was named his replacement in Kid Ory's band in 1919. He played with Ory until 1922, when Ory moved to Los Angeles; that year Rena formed his own band. This ensemble played all the New Orleans jazz houses regularly and played Chicago in 1923–24. He led the Eureka Brass Band in the late 1920s, remaining with them until 1932, when he formed his own brass band.

Rena was hit hard by the Great Depression, and he eked out a living locally in New Orleans playing old-style jazz as it waned in popularity in favor of swing jazz. In 1940, Heywood Hale Broun asked Kid Rena to record. Eight recordings were made in total, done at the Hotel Roosevelt and recorded by local radio station WWL on August 21, 1940. Rena's prowess as a live soloist was legendary, but by the time he recorded, he had lost much of his technical ability, and the recordings were of poor quality. Joe Rene (Kid Rena's brother and drummer on the session) said that Kid refrained from playing high notes on the recording session because "he didn't want anyone to get his style". The recordings are widely regarded as the first recordings of the revival of the New Orleans style in the 1940s.

The records were released on Delta Records, a label only used to release these eight recordings as four singles. Later, Circle Records acquired the masters, and the material was reissued by Riverside Records as albums. In the 1990s the material, alongside some previously unreleased rehearsal recordings, appeared on compact disc from American Music Records.

Rena never recorded again; he was an alcoholic, and failing health led him to stop playing in 1947. He died two years later, at the age of 50.
