= Punch Miller =

American jazz trumpeter (1894–1971)

Ernest Miller, also known as Punch Miller or Kid Punch Miller (June 10, 1894 – December 2, 1971), was an American traditional jazz trumpeter.

Miller was born in Raceland, Louisiana, United States. He was known in New Orleans, Louisiana, where he was based from 1919 to 1927, when he moved to Chicago. In New Orleans he headed the Crescent City Orchestra since 1919, when he took over it from Jack Carey. In Chicago he worked with various bands, including those of Jelly Roll Morton and Tiny Parham, and appeared on a number of recordings. He is also confirmed to be the cornettist on the Gennett recordings of the obscure ensemble King Mutt and his Tennessee Thumpers.

His lifestyle and the decline of Dixieland Jazz led to his falling out of the limelight. This changed with the rising importance of the Preservation Hall Jazz Band and he returned to national attention.

He returned to New Orleans, playing at Preservation Hall and leading a band under his own name, in addition to playing with other groups.

In 1963, he toured Japan with the clarinetist George Lewis.

Miller was the subject of the television documentary Til the Butcher Cuts Him Down.
