= Captain John Handy =

American jazz alto saxophonist (1900–1971)

Captain John Handy (June 24, 1900 – January 12, 1971), was an American jazz alto saxophonist, who was part of the New Orleans jazz revival.

== Career ==
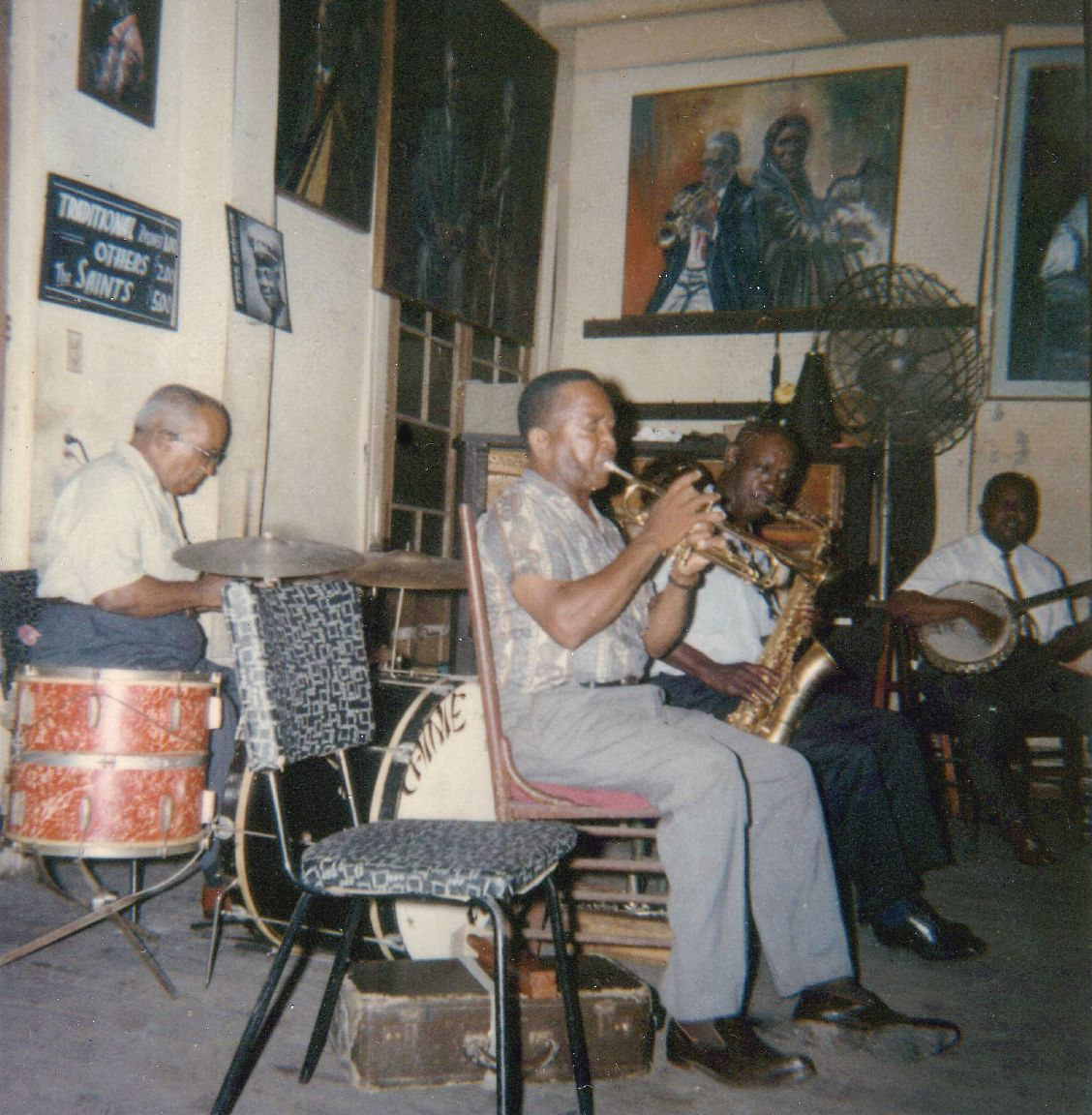
Captain John Handy on saxophone with Kid Sheik Colar on trumpet, Preservation Hall, 1965

Handy was born in Pass Christian, Mississippi, United States. He played clarinet in New Orleans bands in the 1920s, and led the Louisiana Shakers. He switched to alto saxophone in 1928. During the 1960s, he played with Kid Sheik Cola and the Preservation Hall Jazz Band and recorded for GHB, RCA, and Jazz Crusade.

Handy was interviewed several times for the Hogan Jazz Archive at Tulane University, New Orleans, including December 4, 1958 by Richard Allen; December 15, 1958; and November 21, 1963.

Handy died in New York in January 1971, at the age of 70.

== See also ==
- Lionel Ferbos
