= Eureka Brass Band =

American brass band

- Origin: New Orleans, Louisiana
- Genres: Jazz, brass band
- Past members: Harold Dejan

The Eureka Brass Band was a brass band from New Orleans, active from 1920 to 1975, who recorded prolifically for Atlantic Records, Pax, Alamac, Folkways, Jazzology, and Sounds of New Orleans.

The group's membership varied at any given time, usually comprising from nine to eleven members. The typical instrumentation was three trumpets, two trombones, two reeds, tuba, snare drum, and bass drum.

The group was founded by trumpeter Willie Wilson, and its early members included clarinetists Willie Parker, John Casimir, George Lewis and cornetist Kid Rena. In the 1930s Wilson became ill, and trumpeter Alcide Landry retained nominal control over the band. After 1937, when Wilson's condition forced him to leave, sousaphonist Joseph "Red" Clark briefly became the group's leader, followed by Dominique "T-Boy" Remy (1937–46), and then Percy Humphrey, who led the group for the remainder of its existence.

== Line-ups ==
A 1951 album New Orleans Parade features Humphrey, trombonists Charles "Sunny" Henry and Albert Warner, and saxophonist Emanuel Paul.

A mid-1950s line-up comprised Robert Lewis (bass drum); Percy Humphrey, Kid Sheik Colar, and Charlie Love (trumpets); Sonny Henry and Albert Warner (trombones); Ruben Roddy (alto sax); Emanuel Paul (tenor sax), and Red Clark (sousaphone), while another, from 1954, included Willie Pajeaud on trumpet.

Their 1962 sessions Jazz at Preservation Hall, Vol. 1: The Eureka Brass Band of New Orleans, issued on Atlantic Records, features Humphrey and his brother, clarinetist Willie Humphrey, trumpeters Kid Sheik Cola and Pete Bocage, trombonists Albert Warner and Oscar "Chicken" Henry, Emanuel Paul on tenor sax, Wilbert "Bird" Tillman on sousaphone, snare drummer Josiah "Cie" Frazier, and bass drummer Robert "Son Fewclothes" Lewis.

Although the group disbanded after 1975, Humphrey occasionally revived the name for festival performances and other appearances.

== Bibliography ==
- Bruce Eder, Eureka Brass Band at Allmusic
- Schafer/Kernfeld, "Eureka Brass Band". Grove Jazz online.
