= Chris Kelly (jazz) =

American blues trumpeter (c. 1890–1929)

- Birth name: Chris Kelly
- Born: c. 1890
- Origin: Plaquemines Parish, Louisiana, U.S.
- Died: August 19, 1929
- Genres: Jazz
- Instrument: trumpet
- Formerly of: George Lewis

Chris Kelly (c. 1890 – August 19, 1929) was an American blues trumpeter born in Plaquemines Parish, Louisiana, United States, on 'Deer Range Plantation', best known for his early contributions on the New Orleans jazz scene. Throughout the 1920s, he was a regular collaborator with clarinetist George Lewis. No photographs or recordings have survived of Kelly.

== Bibliography ==
- Carr, Ian; Fairweather, Digby; Priestley, Brian. Jazz: The Rough Guide. Penguin, 1995. ISBN 1-85828-137-7.
