= Kid Thomas Valentine =

American jazz trumpeter and bandleader (1896–1987)

- Born: Thomas Valentine; February 3, 1896; Reserve, Louisiana, U.S.
- Died: June 16, 1987 (aged 91) New Orleans, Louisiana, U.S.
- Genres: Jazz
- Occupation: Musician
- Instruments: Trumpet, vocals
- Years active: 1920–1969

Kid Thomas Valentine (February 3, 1896 – June 16, 1987), born Thomas Valentine, was an American jazz trumpeter and bandleader.

Kid Thomas was born in Reserve, Louisiana, and came to New Orleans in his youth. In the early 1920s, he gained a reputation as a hot trumpet man. Starting in 1926 he led his own band, for decades based in the New Orleans in the neighborhood of Algiers. The band was popular with local dancers.

Kid Thomas had perhaps the city's longest lasting old-style traditional jazz dance band. Unlike many other musicians, Thomas was unaffected by the influence of Louis Armstrong and later developments of jazz, continuing to play in his distinctive hot, bluesy, sometimes percussive style. His style was that which is characterized often as, "New Orleans Jazz", in order to differentiate it from the influences that arose from other parts of the country through the years. He was always open to playing the popular tunes of the day (even into the rock and roll era) as he thought any good dance bandleader should do, but he played everything in a style of a New Orleans dance hall of the early 1920s.

Kid Thomas started attracting a wider following with his first recordings in the 1950s. His band played regularly at Preservation Hall from the 1960s through the 1980s. Kid Thomas also toured extensively for the Hall, including a Russian tour, and was often a guest at European clubs and festivals, working with various local bands as well as his own. During the 1960s Kid Thomas recorded extensively for the Jazz Crusade label both with his own band and with Big Bill Bissonnette's Easy Riders Jazz Band. He made more than 20 tours with the Easy Riders in the U.S. Northeast.

In the mid-1980s, as Kid Thomas's strength started to wane, Preservation Hall management brought in Wendell Brunious, at first as second trumpet. Brunious took over most of the trumpet playing in Kid Thomas's final year or so, although Kid Thomas continued to lead the band and keep rhythm with a slap stick.

He died in 1987 and was buried at All Saints Catholic Church in Algiers, New Orleans.

== Discography ==
- Kid Thomas and His Algiers Stompers (Riverside, 1960)
- Kid Thomas-George Lewis Ragtime Stompers (G.H.B. Records, 1962)
- Kid Thomas Valentine's Creole Jazz Band (American Music, 1993)
