= George Lewis (clarinetist) =

American jazz clarinetist (1900–1968)

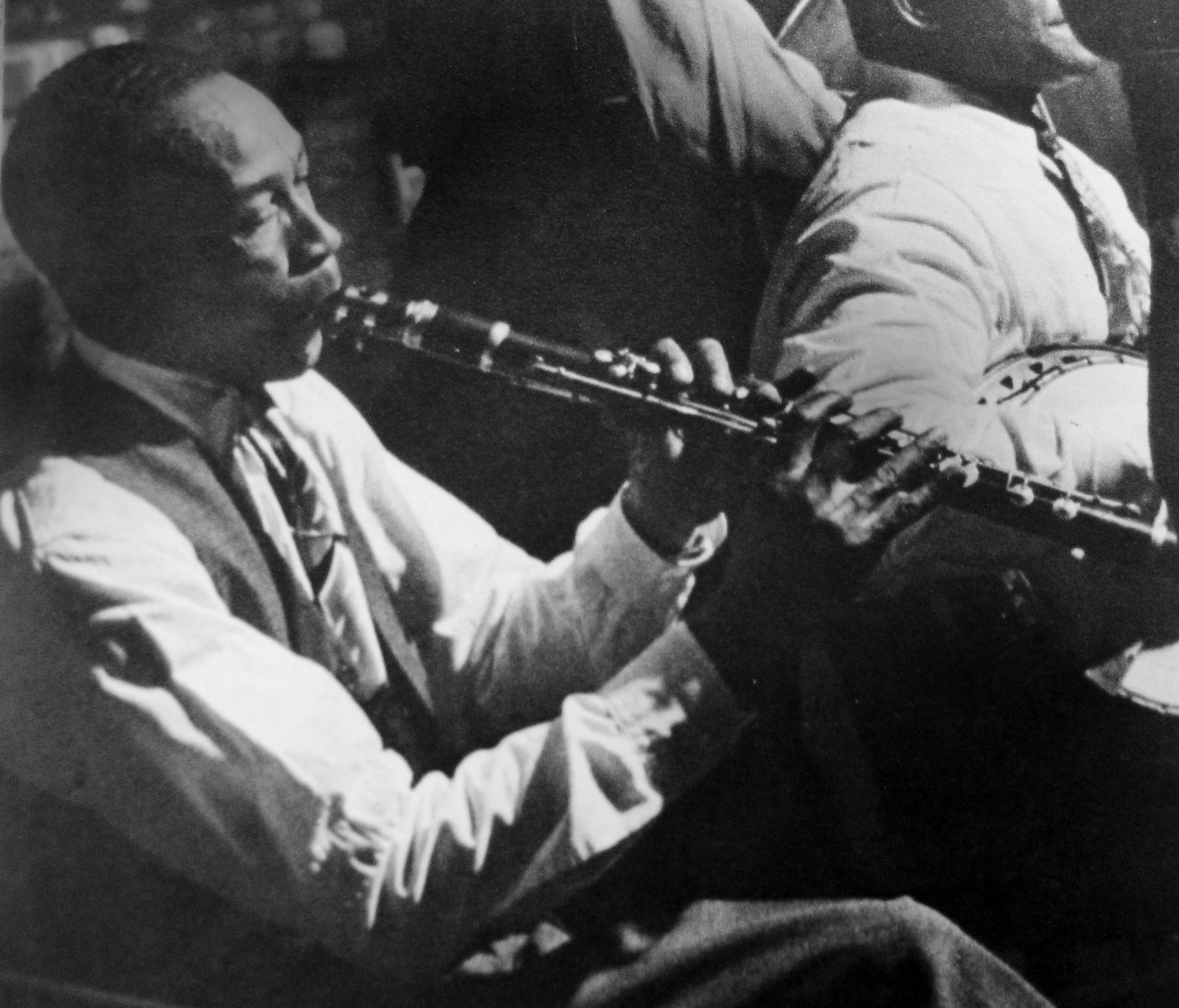
- Photograph by Stanley Kubrick published in Look magazine on June 6, 1950

Background information
- Born: Joseph Louis Francois Zenon; July 13, 1900; New Orleans, Louisiana
- Died: December 31, 1968 (aged 68) New Orleans
- Genres: Jazz
- Occupation: Musician
- Instrument: Clarinet
- Years active: 1917–68
- Labels: American Music, Decca, Victor, GHB

George Lewis (born Joseph Louis Francois Zenon; July 13, 1900 – December 31, 1968) was an American jazz clarinetist who achieved his highest profile in the later decades of his life.

== Early life ==
Lewis was born in the French Quarter of New Orleans in 1900 and lived at 3327 De Armas Street in the Algiers section of New Orleans. Through his mother, Alice Zeno, his maternal great-great-grandmother was a Senegalese slave who was brought to Louisiana around 1803. Zeno's family retained some knowledge of Senegalese language and customs until Alice's generation.

== Personal life ==
George married Emma Zeno in 1918 in New Orleans, they had four children, Mildred Zeno-Major; Joseph Zeno; William (Bill) Zeno; and George (Baby George).

== Musical career ==
During the 1920s, he founded the New Orleans Stompers. In the decade he also worked with Chris Kelly, Buddy Petit, Kid Rena, and was a member of the Eureka Brass Band and the Olympia Orchestra. In the 1930s, he played with Bunk Johnson, De De Pierce, and Billie Pierce. He recorded with Johnson in the early 1940s and with Kid Shots Madison. Alan Lomax brought Lewis on a Rudi Blesh radio show in 1942 in which Lewis played "Woodchopper's Ball" by Woody Herman.

Unable to earn enough money as a musician, he worked loading and unloading ships' cargo at docks of the Mississippi River. In 1944, Lewis was injured while working on the docks. A heavy container nearly crushed his chest. He practiced while convalescing in bed at his St. Phillips Street home in the French Quarter. His friends, banjoist Lawrence Marrero and double bassist Alcide Pavageau, brought their instruments to his bedside. Bill Russell brought his portable recorder and they recorded "Burgundy Street Blues", improvised blues song that was to become the Lewis signature piece. As Russell recorded Lewis, he occasionally gave new titles to interpretations of pop tunes, such as "New Orleans Hula" for "Hula Lou". These changes may have been made for copyright reasons, but occasionally it was because musicians reported the titles inaccurately to Russell.

Lewis stayed with Johnson's band through 1946. This included a trip to New York City, where they played for dancing at the Stuyvesant Casino on Second Avenue. Band members included Johnson, Marrero, Pavageau, trombonist Jim Robinson, pianist Alton Purnell, and drummer Baby Dodds. While in New York, they recorded for Decca and Victor. After Johnson retired, Lewis took over leadership of the band, which included Robinson, Pavageau, Marrero, Purnell, Joe Watkins, and a succession of New Orleans trumpeters: Elmer Talbert, Kid Howard, and Percy Humphrey. Starting in 1949, Lewis was a regular on Bourbon Street clubs and radio station WDSU.

His band was profiled in the June 6, 1950, issue of Look magazine with photographs by Stanley Kubrick. His reputation grew and he became a leader of the New Orleans revival.

In the late 1940s and early 1950s, his recordings reached the UK and influenced clarinetists Monty Sunshine and Acker Bilk. They became important contributors to the traditional jazz scene in the UK and accompanied Lewis when he toured the country.

Lewis visited England in 1957, playing throughout the country with Ken Colyer's Jazzmen. In 1959, he returned, this time with his full band, and received a warm response. In 1959, he visited Denmark and played at Jazzhus Montmartre in Copenhagen.

Beginning in the 1960s, he played regularly at Preservation Hall in New Orleans as leader of the Preservation Hall Jazz Band until shortly before his death. His performances were painted by artists in the city. Sitting portraits by Noel Rockmore were sold to collectors. Rockwell painted several musicians who had performed at Preservation Hall.

Jazz critic Gary Giddins described Lewis as "an affecting musician with a fat-boned sound but limited technique".

== Death ==
Lewis was Catholic. He died on December 31, 1968, from unknown causes.

== Discography ==
- American Music (American Music, 1951)
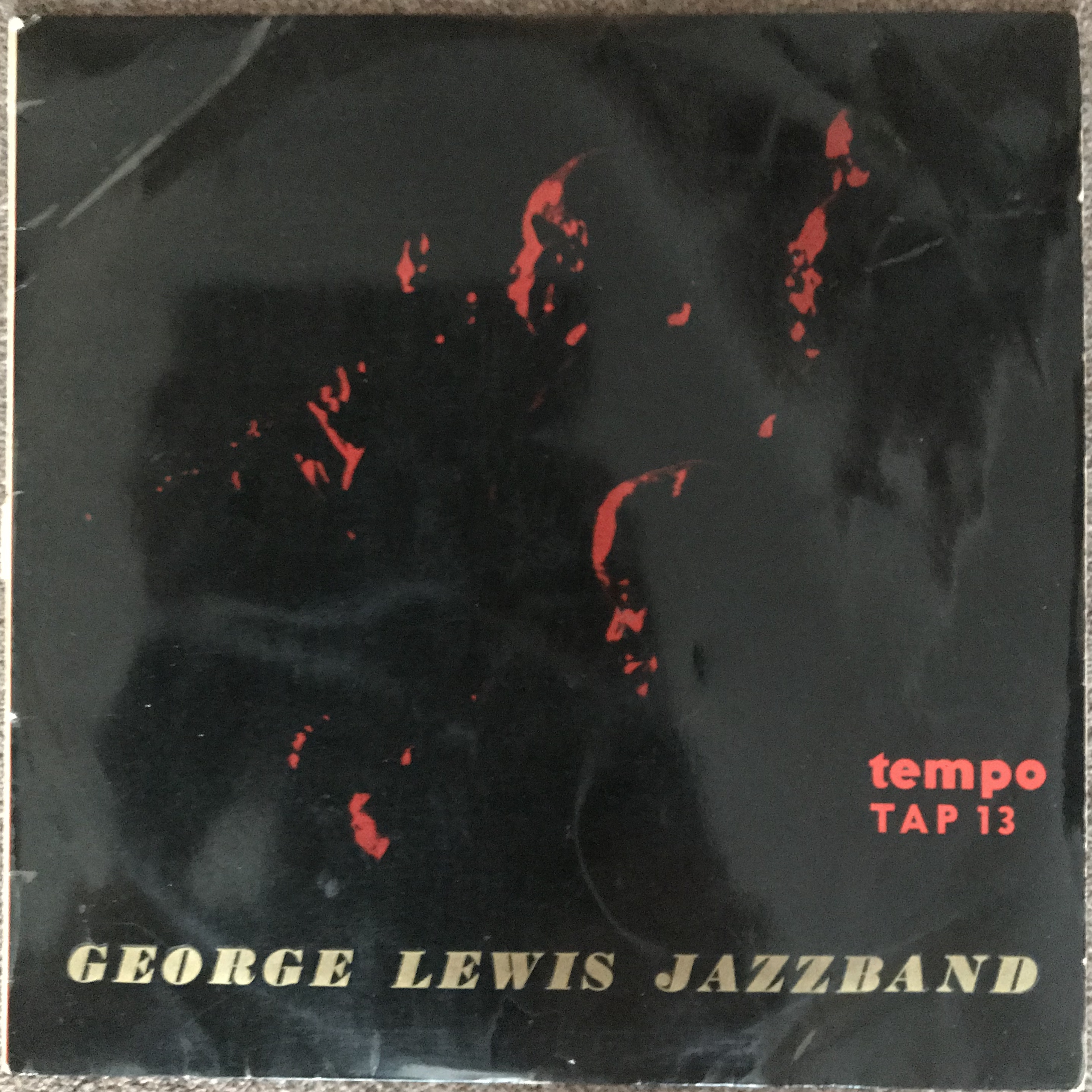
- George Lewis’ Ragtime Jazz Band (Tempo Records, London UK 1954?)
- New Orleans Jazz Band and Quartet (Riverside, 1954)
- George Lewis And His New Orleans Stompers (Volume 1) (Blue Note, 1955)
- Jazz in the Classic New Orleans Tradition (Riverside, 1956)
- George Lewis & Turk Murphy at Newport (Verve, 1957)
- Jazz at Vespers (Riverside, 1957)
- The Perennial George Lewis (Verve, 1958)
- Blues from the Bayou (Verve, 1959)
- "Dr. Jazz"/"Doctor Jazz" George Lewis and his Orchestra (His Master's Voice, UK, 1960 - recorded 1959, feat. Andrew Anderson tpt, Robert Mielke trm, Joe Robichaux p, Alcide Pavageau bs, Joe Watkins dr & vocals)[Verve Series]
- Jazz at Preservation Hall 4: The George Lewis Band of New Orleans (Atlantic, 1963)
- George Lewis Plays Hymns (1965)
- With Papa Bue's Viking Jazz Band (Storyville, 1991)
- Hot Creole Jazz 1953 (DCC, 1991)
- George Lewis with Red Allen (American Music, 1992)
- In Stockholm (Dragon, 1992)
- For Dancer's Only (GHB, 1993)
- Jazz at the Ohio Union (Storyville, 1994)
- The Beverly Caverns Sessions (Good Time Jazz, 1994)
- George Lewis of New Orleans (Original Jazz Classics, 1994)
- Jazz Funeral in New Orleans (Rykodisc, 1997)
- Reunion (Delmark, 1997)
- At Congo Square (American Music, 1998)
- George Lewis in Hi-Fi (Upbeat, 2008)

== Bibliography ==
- Bethell, Tom (1977). George Lewis: A Jazzman from New Orleans. University of California Press. ISBN 0-520-03212-8.
- Fairbairn, Ann (1969). Call Him George: A Biography of George Lewis, The Man, His Faith and His Music. Crown Publishers. LCCN 73-93389. OCLC 46912.
- Sancton, Tom (2006). Song for My Fathers: A New Orleans Story in Black and White. Other Press. ISBN 1-59051-376-2.
