= Jazz Information =

Jazz publication

Jazz Information was an American non-commercial weekly jazz publication founded as a record collector's sheet in 1939 by Eugene Williams (1918–1948), Ralph Gleason, Ralph de Toledano, and Jean Rayburn (maiden name; 1918–2009), who married Ralph Gleason in 1940.

== History ==
The first issue, dated September 8, 1939, was a four-page newsletter that was mimeographed late one night in the back room of the Commodore Music Shop in Manhattan at 46 West 52nd Street. In July 1940, Jazz Information, went from a newsletter to a little magazine format, hip pocket in size with modest typesetting. George Hoefer, Jr. (1909–1967), began the "Safety Valve" column on collecting, collectors, and how collectors annoyed musicians. The publication ran sporadically until November 1941.

=== Editorial bent ===
Stephen W Smith, editor of the Hot Record Society Rag, leaned towards what then was progressive jazz. Eugene Williams, through Jazz Information, leaned towards a New Orleans revivalists bent.

== Record label ==
Jazz Information was a record label distributed by Commodore Records that produced recordings of Bunk Johnson in 1942. Bill Russell, while gathering material for Jazzmen in 1938, discovered long forgotten New Orleans trumpeter Bunk Johnson on a farm in New Iberia, Louisiana. In 1942, Russell helped get Johnson a new set of teeth and a new trumpet. And, with Eugene Williams, editor if Jazz Information in New York; and Dave Stuart (né David Ashford Stuart; 1910–1984), owner of the Jazz Man Record Shop in Hollywood, traveled to New Orleans and made the first recordings of Bunk Johnson.

== Selected articles ==
- "Zue Robertson: King of the Trombone" (Zue Robertson), by William Russell 1 (1940): 3
- "Omer Simeon" (Omer Simeon), by Herman Rosenberg & Eugene Williams, Vol. 2, No. 1, July 26, 1940, pps. 8–9
- "William Russell" (Bill Russell), by Ed Nylund, Vol. 2, No. 2, August 9, 1940, pps. 15–16 (earliest known published biography of William Russell)
- "Ma Rainey Discography," (Ma Rainey), by William C. Love, Vol. 2, September 6, 1940, pps. 9–14 (discography) (Love was founder of the International Association of Jazz Record Collectors)
- "Jimmie Noone" (Jimmie Noone), by Wesley Miles Neff (1913–1996) of Chicago, Vol 2, October 4, 1940, pps. 6–9, 45
- "Cow Cow Davenport" (Charles Edward Davenport), by Donald Haynes, Vol. 2, October 25, 1940, pps. 8–10
- "Barney Bigard" (Barney Bigard), by George Hoefer, Jr. (1909–1967), Vol. 2, November 8, 1940, pps. 7–13 (extensive article plus discography; Hoefer later was associate editor of Jazz & Pop)
- "Little Mitch" (George Mitchell), by Wesley Miles Neff (1913–1996), Vol. 2, No. 16, November 1941, pps. 31–32
- "A History of Jazz Information" (transcript), by Eugene Williams, Vol. 2, November 1941, pps. 93–101

New Orleans Clarinet series

- "New Orleans Clarinets: 2 – Edmond Hall" (Edmond Hall), by Herman Rosenberg & Eugene Williams, Vol. 2, No. 2, August 9, 1940
- "New Orleans Clarinets: 7 – Sidney Bechet" (Sidney Bechet), by Mary Evelyn Karoley (née Mary Frances Mellon; 1908–1993), Vol. 2, No. 8, December 6, 1940

Possible related articles

- Jazzways, George Sigmund Rosenthal (1922–1967) & Frank Zachary (né Frank Zaharija; 1914–2015) (eds.) (© 21 January 1946; Jazzways, Cincinnati) (more than 100 photos by Skippy Adelman, Bernice Abbott, and Sargent John Marsh; 1916–2003)

Cincinnati: Jazzways (1946); OCLC 10396118, 367353290, 839356128, 979896906
New York: Greenberg (1946, 1947); OCLC 3501413, 21397381, 611017552
London: Musicians Press Ltd. (1947); OCLC 654341520, 28753218, 795465371, 774482619
(Greenberg, Publisher, founded in 1924 by Jacob Walter Greenberg; 1894–1974; & David Benjamin Greenberg; 1892–1968; sold to Chilton Book Company in 1958)

Contributors
Vol. 1

"Report From Abroad," by Albert McCarthy
"Jazz begins," by Rudi Blesh
"Three Horns, Four Rhythm," by Dale Curran
"Going Down State Street," by Frederic Ramsey, Jr.
"Portrait of a Jazzman," Art Hodes
"Benny Goodman," by Alexander King
"Swing," by Frank Stacy, p. 49
"Lionel Hampton, by Peter Fischer
"New Orleans Today," by Eugene Williams & Julius "Skippy" Adelman (photographer) (note: Adelman, who later gave up photography, is still considered among the finest jazz photographers)
"Discollecting," by Frederic Ramsey, Jr.

Vol. 2

"Jazz begins," by Rudi Blesh
"Old Photographs"
"Going Down State Street," by Frederic Ramsey, Jr.
"Condon Mob"
"Hot Royalty"
"Benny Goodman," by Alexander King
"Lionel Hampton, by Peter Fischer
"Swing," by Frank Stacy (Stacy was, in the early 1940s, the New York editor for Down Beat)
"New Orleans Today," by Eugene Williams & Julius "Skippy" Adelman (born around 1924) (photographer) (note: Adelman, who later gave up photography, is still considered among the finest jazz photographers) Philadelphia jazz journalist Nels Nelson wrote in 1985 that Adelman was among the greatest jazz photographers in the world. (Note: Nels Nelson (né Nels Robert Nelson; 1923–1996) was a jazz columnist for the Philadelphia Daily News for over 40 years. He retired from the Daily News in 1995 and passed away the following year.) In 1990, Nelson wrote that renowned jazz photographer "[Bill] Gottlieb ranks second only to the elusive Skippy Adelman in his capacity for capturing the moment."
"Discollecting," by Frederic Ramsey, Jr.
"Collector's Items"
"One for the Money"
"Two for the Show"
"Concerto for Woody"
"Portrait of a Jazzman," by Art Hodes (Hodes launched The Jazz Record in February 1943, which ran for 60 issues that ended November 1947)
"Three Brass, Four Rhythm," by Dale Curran, p. 24

== Selected discography ==
Artists re-issued by Jazz Information

- Freddie Keppard (Paramount)
- Ollie Powers (Claxtonola)
- Leola B. Wilson (Paramount)
- Trixie Smith (Paramount)
- Red Onion Jazz Babies (Gennett)
- Bunk Johnson (Purist) (Note: Purist Records were produced by the London-based Bunk Johnson Appreciation Society between 1954 and 1963.)
- Duke Ellington (unissued, Brunswick, Columbia, Lucky (Tokyo))
- Bunny Berigan (unissued, Vocalion, Columbia)
- Frank Froeba (unissued, Vocalion)
- Don Albert (Vocalion)
- Boots and His Buddies (Note: Boots and His Buddies personnel: Billy Douglas (trumpet, vocals); Alvin Alcorn, Hiram Harding (trumpets); James Robinson, Frank Jacquet (trombones); Gus Patterson, Harold "Dink" Taylor (alto saxes); Herb Hall (clarinet, alto sax, bari sax); Louis Cottrell (clarinet, tenor sax); Lloyd Glenn (piano); Ferdinand Dejan (guitar); James Johnson (double bass); Albert Martin (drums); Merle Turner, Don Albert (directors); Lloyd Glenn (arranger); Merle Turner (vocals); Israel Wicks (vocals); unknown vocal trio on "I Like You Best of All.") (Bluebird)
- Carolina Cotton Pickers (Note: Carolina Cotton Pickers probable personnel: Cat Anderson (trumpet); 2 of the three mentioned on trumpet, John Williams, Thad Seabrook, Joseph Williams (trumpets); Leroy Hardison, Eugene Earl (trombones); Booker Starks, Lew Williams, Addison White, Aaron Harvey (saxes); Cliff Smalls (piano); W.J. Edwards (guitar); Lew Turman (double bass); Otis Walker (drums) (see Jenkins Orphanage)) (Vocalion)
- Ernie Fields (Vocalion)
- Louis Armstrong (Storyville)
- Joe Newman (Metronome)
- Gerry Mulligan (Ingo) (Note: Ingo Records was an Italian bootleg label that issued rare jazz broadcasts)

Artists produced by Jazz Information

- Bunk Johnson

== Personnel ==
=== Magazine staff ===
- 1939–1941: Eugene Williams, publisher, graduated from Columbia College in 1939 (Note: Eugene Williams (1918–1948) – see a short biographical note on Gene Williams (1918-1948) in Bill Russell's American Music (BRAM), compiled and edited by Mike Hazeldine, Jazzology Press (1993), p. 170; ISBN 0963889001; ISBN 9780963889003; OCLC 1050495610, 939852788)
- 1939–1940: Ralph Gleason, associate editor, co-founded Rolling Stone in 1967
- Ralph de Toledano
- Herman Rosenberg
- George Hoefer (né Elmer George Hoefer, Jr.; 1909–1967) – born in Laramie, raised in Chapel Hill with a bachelor of science degree in civil engineering from UNC Chapel Hill – Hoefer went on to become a prolific jazz historian. From 1959 to 1961, he was the New York editor for Down Beat for which he had a column, "The Hot Box."

=== Magazine tag line ===
"The weekly magazine," September 19, 1939, to June 14, 1940

== Library access ==
- OCLC 755192229
- OCLC 12999167
- OCLC 474299592
- OCLC 1012096868

Re-publications

- OCLC 499210838
- OCLC 858501144 (microfilm)

== Online transcriptions, current and archived ==
1. Vol. 1, Nos. 2–10. September 19, 1939, to November 14, 1939. 26 May 2012 – via Blog of Benedict Eastaugh and Chris Sternal-Johnson at WordPress.

Archived via Wayback Machine

2. Vol. 1, No. 2. September 19, 1939. Archived from the original on March 7, 2005.
3. Vol. 1, No. 3. September 26, 1939. Archived from the original on March 7, 2005.
4. Vol. 1, No. 4. October 3, 1939. Archived from the original on March 7, 2005.
5. Vol. 1, No. 5. October 10, 1939. Archived from the original on March 7, 2005.
6. Vol. 1, No. 6. October 17, 1939. Archived from the original on March 7, 2005.
7. Vol. 1, No. 7. October 24, 1939. Archived from the original on March 7, 2005.
8. Vol. 1, No. 8. October 31, 1939. Archived from the original on March 7, 2005.
9. Vol. 1, No. 9. November 7, 1939. Archived from the original on March 12, 2005.
10. Vol. 1, No. 10. November 14, 1939. Archived from the original on March 7, 2005.
11. Vol. 1, No. 11. November 24, 1939. Archived from the original on March 7, 2005.
12. Vol. 1, No. 12. December 1, 1939. Archived from the original on March 7, 2005.
13. Vol. 1, No. 13. December 8, 1939. Archived from the original on March 9, 2005.
14. Vol. 1, No. 14. December 15, 1939. Archived from the original on March 7, 2005.
15. Vol. 1, No. 15. December 22, 1939. Archived from the original on March 10, 2005.
16. Vol. 1, No. 16. December 29, 1939. Archived from the original on March 7, 2005.
17. Vol. 1, No. 17. January 5, 1940. Archived from the original on March 7, 2005.
18. Vol. 1, No. 18. January 12, 1940. Archived from the original on March 7, 2005.
19. Vol. 1, No. 19. January 26, 1940. Archived from the original on March 7, 2005.
20. Vol. 1, No. 20. February 2, 1940. Archived from the original on March 10, 2005.
21. Vol. 1, No. 21. February 9, 1940. Archived from the original on March 7, 2005.
22. Vol. 1, No. 22. February 16, 1940. Archived from the original on March 10, 2005.
  (transcript incorrectly identifies this as Vol. 21)
23. Vol. 1, No. 23. February 23, 1940. Archived from the original on March 10, 2005.
24. Vol. 1, No. 24. March 1, 1940. Archived from the original on March 7, 2005.
25. Vol. 1, No. 25. March 8, 1940. Archived from the original on February 16, 2005.
  (transcript incorrectly identifies this as January 12, 1939, Vol. I, No. 21)

== Bibliography ==
=== Books, journals, magazines, and papers ===
- Burke, Patrick Lawrence, PhD (2008). Come In and Hear the Truth: Jazz and Race on 52nd Street (limited preview). University of Chicago Press – via Google Books. OCLC 845157228 (all editions).
- "Record Changer (The)".. 8 (3). March 1949. Retrieved May 18, 2019 – via Internet Archive LCCN 2003-223732; OCLC 01774075 (all editions).
1. Finkelstein, Sidney (1909–1974) (1949). "Peace in the Ranks": 11–12.
2. Delaunay, Charles (1949). "An Attack on Critical Jabberwalky": 13–14.
- Gennari, John Remo, PhD (2006). Blowin' Hot and Cool: Jazz and Its Critics (limited preview). University of Chicago Press. p. 80 – via Google Books. LCCN 2005-30539; ISBN 0-2262-8922-2; OCLC 984430439 (all editions).
- Hillman, Christopher (1988). Bunk Johnson: His Life and Times. Universe Books. p. 80 – via Internet Archive. LCCN 87-35765; ISBN 0-8766-3685-7; ISBN 0-8766-3745-4 (paperback); OCLC 17300604 (all editions), 652332358 (all editions).
- Charters, Samuel Barclay, IV (February 1958). Jazz: New Orleans, 1885–1957.. Belleville, New Jersey: Walter C. Allen. pp. 35, 140–141 – via Internet Archive.
- Popular Photography (June 1946). "Jazz Pix".. 18 (6). Chicago: Ziff-Davis Publishing Company: 54–55 – via Google Books. OCLC 5517354 (all editions).
- Toledano, Ralph de (1994) [1947]. Frontiers of Jazz (limited preview) (3rd revised ed.). Pelican Publishing Company. p. 89 – via Google Books. LCCN 93-42542; ISBN 1-5655-4043-3; OCLC 461364170 (all editions).
- Welburn, Ronald Garfield, PhD (Autumn 1987). "Jazz Magazines of the 1930s: An Overview of Their Provocative Journalism". American Music. 5 (3). University of Illinois Press: 255–270. doi:10.2307/3051735. JSTOR 3051735. ISSN 0734-4392 (publication); JSTOR 3051735 (article); OCLC 6733330569, 7376919917 (article).
- William, Eugene (November 1941). "A History of Jazz Information". Jazz Information (transcript). 2 (16): 93–101.
  Retrieved May 18, 2019 – via www.swingdjs.com – jazz forum site that was active for 16 years, through January 2019, registered to and maintained by Jesse Miner, a San Francisco area chef and jazz history enthusiast. The forum boards were closed in January 2019, but much of its content, as of May 2022, is accessible. The 23 links to transcripts of Jazz Information on a former website of the late Joseph Elbert Shepherd (1926–2021) of Sterling, Virginia (https://www.swingdjs.com/viewtopic.php?t=1488), have been archived by Wayback Machine.
- Wilson, John S. (September 1963). "A Real New Orleans Sound: The Story of Preservation Hall and Its Ancient Jazzmen" (PDF). High Fidelity.: 59–63 & 133. Archived from the original (PDF) on August 21, 2018 – via www.americanradionhistory.com → maintained by David Frackelton Gleason of Cleveland.

=== News media ===
- Philadelphia Daily News; Nelson, Nels (November 22, 1985). "Some People Sweat Better Than Others". Vol. 61, no. 162. p. 70 – via Newspapers.com. ProQuest 1827395706 (US Newsstream database).
- Philadelphia Daily News; Nelson, Nels (June 22, 1990). "Snap Judgements – Bill Gottlieb's Photos Are a History of Jazz". Vol. 66, no. 70. p. 50 – via Newspapers.com. ProQuest 1834816535 (US Newsstream database).
