= Charles Edward Smith (jazz) =

American jazz critic

Charles Edward Smith (June 8, 1904 in Thomaston, Connecticut – December 16, 1970 in New York City) was an American jazz author and critic. He was the author or editor of several important early books on jazz history.

Smith began to collect early hot jazz records in the 1920s and worked with William Russell, Eugene Williams, John Hammond, Hugues Panassié and Charles Delaunay in the Hot Record Society from 1937, from which the jazz label HRS Records sprang. With Steve Smith he was editor of the jazz magazine Hot Record Society Rag.

With essays in journals such as the Symposium, Daily Worker and Esquire, Smith was among the early jazz critics in the 1930s. With Frederic Ramsey (1915–1995) he published the book Jazzmen, which appeared in 1939 and, with Wilder Hobson's American Jazz Music, was one of America's first jazz books, with articles on groups like the Austin High School Gang and interviews From early jazz musicians like Willie Cornish, Papa Jack Laine, Leon Roppolo and Nick LaRocca. Smith and Ramsey argued that then-popular swing was rooted stylistically in blues and traditional jazz. In the course of the research on the book, the interviewed musicians mentioned the name Bunk Johnson again and again; This led to the then-forgotten trumpeter of New Orleans Jazz being rediscovered by Bill Russell in 1942.

With the 1942 Jazz Record Book, an attempt was made to generate a canon of important jazz records, which was later taken up by many other writers, including Marshall Stearns's The Story of Jazz, Joachim-Ernst Berendt/Günther Huesmann's jazz book, Barry Kernfeld, editor of The New Grove Dictionary of Jazz, and Allen Lowe's That Devilin' Tune.

Smith also wrote for The New Republic (1938), the magazine Jazz Information, and wrote a series of liner notes from folk music albums (Folk Music USA: Vol. 1 (1959) and Music Down Home: An Introduction to Negro Folk Music, U.S.A. (1965), for Folkways Records, folk blues (Big Bill Broonzy Sings Country Blues, 1957), early jazz (Pee Wee Russell, Jelly Roll Morton) as well as modern jazz, including productions by Al Cohn, Miles Davis (Milestones, 1958), Chico Hamilton (South Pacific in Hi-Fi, 1957) and JJ Johnson (Dial J.J. 5, 1955). Smith also wrote the accompaniment text for the LP edition of John Hammond's Concert Series, From Spirituals to Swing – Carnegie Hall Concerts, 1938/39 (Vanguard).

In the opinion of the International Society of Jazz Research, Smith was one of the most important early serious jazz critics, alongside Hugues Panassié, Winthrop Sargeant, Wilder Hobson, Don Knowlton, and Aaron Copland.

== Bibliography ==
- Charles Edward Smith, Frederic Ramsey: Jazzmen. New York: Harcourt & Brace, 1939.
- Charles Edward Smith, Frederic Ramsey, Charles Payne Rogers, etc.: The Jazz Record Book. New York: Smith & Durell, 1942
- Charles Edward Smith: Jelly Roll Morton's New Orleans Memories. New York: General Records Division. Consolidated Records, Inc.
