= Ralph J. Gleason =

American music critic (1917–1975)

- Born: Ralph Joseph Gleason; March 1, 1917; New York City, U.S.
- Died: June 3, 1975 (aged 58); Berkeley, California, U.S.
- Education: Columbia University
- Occupations: Critic, columnist, editor
- Spouse: Jean Rayburn (m. 1940)
- Children: 3

Ralph Joseph Gleason (March 1, 1917 – June 3, 1975) was an American music critic and columnist. He contributed for many years to the San Francisco Chronicle, was a founding editor of Rolling Stone magazine, and cofounder of the Monterey Jazz Festival. A pioneering jazz and rock critic, he helped the San Francisco Chronicle transition into the rock era.

== Life and career ==
Ralph Joseph Gleason was born in New York City on March 1, 1917. Gleason discovered jazz when, during a siege of measles while a student at Horace Greeley High School in Chappaqua, New York, he heard Louis Armstrong, Earl Hines and Fletcher Henderson on the radio. He graduated from Columbia University (where he was news editor of the Columbia Daily Spectator) in 1938. In 1939, Gleason co-founded Jazz Information with Eugene Williams, Ralph de Toledano, and Jean Rayburn, who Gleason would marry in 1940 and have three children.

During World War II, he worked for the Office of War Information. After the war, Gleason settled in San Francisco, which he considered a better town for hearing jazz than New York, and began writing for the San Francisco Chronicle. Gleason wrote a syndicated column on jazz, hosted radio programs, and co-founded the Monterey Jazz Festival with James L. Lyons. He also wrote liner notes for Lenny Bruce's comedy albums and testified for the defense at Bruce's San Francisco 1962 obscenity trial.

Gleason wrote liner notes for a broad variety of releases, including the 1959 Frank Sinatra album No One Cares and the 1970 Miles Davis album Bitches Brew. From 1948 to 1960, he doubled as an associate editor and critic for DownBeat. He also taught music appreciation courses at University of California Extension (1960-1963) and Sonoma State University (1965-1967).

Gleason began to support several Bay Area rock bands, including Jefferson Airplane and the Grateful Dead, in the late 1960s.

Gleason was a contributing editor to Ramparts, a prominent leftist magazine based in San Francisco, but quit after editor Warren Hinckle criticized the city's growing hippie population. With Jann Wenner, another Ramparts staffer, Gleason founded the bi-weekly music magazine Rolling Stone, to which he contributed as a consulting editor until his death in 1975. He was in the midst of an acrimonious split with Wenner and the magazine when he died. For ten years he also wrote a syndicated weekly column on jazz and pop music that ran in the New York Post and many other papers throughout the United States and Europe.

Gleason's articles also appeared other publications, including The New York Times, The Guardian, The Times, New Statesman, Evergreen Review, The American Scholar, Saturday Review, the New York Herald Tribune, the Los Angeles Times, the Chicago Sun-Times, the Sydney Morning Herald, Playboy, Esquire, Variety, The Milwaukee Journal^{1} and Hi-Fi/Stereo Review.

For National Educational Television (now known as PBS), Gleason produced a series of twenty-eight programs on jazz and blues, Jazz Casual, featuring Dizzy Gillespie, B.B. King, John Coltrane, Dave Brubeck, the Modern Jazz Quartet, Vince Guaraldi with Bola Sete, Jimmy Witherspoon, and Sonny Rollins, among others. The series ran from 1961 to 1968. He also produced a two-hour documentary on Duke Ellington, which was twice nominated for an Emmy.

Other films for television included a four-part series on the Monterey Jazz Festival, the first documentary for television on pop music, Anatomy of a Hit, and the hour-long programs on San Francisco rock, Go Ride the Music, for the series Fanfare, episode 9, for National Educational Television, A Night at the Family Dog, episode 10, for National Educational Television, and West Pole.

Gleason's name shows up in tribute on Red Garland's "Ralph J. Gleason Blues" from the 1958 recording Rojo (Prestige PRLP 7193), re-released on Red's Blues in 1998.

Gleason's lasting legacy, however, is his work with Rolling Stone. His name, alongside that of Hunter S. Thompson, still remains on the magazine's masthead today, more than five decades after his death.

On June 3, 1975, Gleason died of a heart attack at the age of 58 in Berkeley, California.

== Ralph J. Gleason Music Book Award ==
Originally awarded by BMI and Rolling Stone. Currently awarded by the Rock & Roll Hall of Fame, New York University’s Clive Davis Institute of Recorded Music, and The Pop Conference.

- 1990: Standing in the Shadows of Motown: The Life and Music of Legendary Bassist James Jamerson by Allan Slutsky
- 1993: Rhythm and the Blues by Jerry Wexler
- 1994: Last Train to Memphis: The Rise of Elvis Presley by Peter Guralnick
- 1998: Visions of Jazz: The First Century by Gary Giddins
- 2002: Bing Crosby: A Pocketful of Dreams by Gary Giddins
- 2000: Workin' Man Blues: Country Music in California by Gerald W. Haslam
- 2022: Liner Notes for the Revolution: The Intellectual Life of Black Feminist Sound by Daphne A. Brooks

== Bibliography ==
- Jam Session (1957), G.P. Putnam's Sons
- Jam Session: An Anthology of Jazz (1958), Peter Davies Pub.
- The Jefferson Airplane and the San Francisco Sound (1969), Ballantine Books OCLC 19838
- Celebrating the Duke and Louie, Bessie, Billie, Bird, Carmen, Miles, Dizzy & Others (1975), Atlantic-Little, Brown. ISBN 0-306-80645-2
- Conversations in Jazz: The Ralph J. Gleason Interviews (2016), Yale University Press. ISBN 978-0-300-21452-9. Interviews with John Coltrane, Quincy Jones, Dizzy Gillespie, John Lewis, Milt Jackson, Percy Heath, Connie Kay, Sonny Rollins, "Philly" Joe Jones, Bill Evans, Horace Silver, Duke Ellington, Les McCann, Jon Hendricks.
- Music in the Air: The Selected Writings of Ralph J. Gleason (2016), Yale University Press.

== Quotations ==
This generation is producing poets who write songs, and never before in the sixty-year history of American popular music has this been true.

— Paul Du Noyer, The Illustrated Encyclopedia of Music, 2003

In a 1976 review in Rolling Stone magazine of the Santana album Caravanserai, Gleason wrote that the album affirmed, and "speaks directly to the universality of man, both in the sound of the music and in the vocals."
