= Eugene Williams (jazz critic) =

American jazz writer (1918–1948)

Eugene Bernard Williams (May 18, 1918 – May 5, 1948) was an American jazz writer who, in 1939, co-founded Jazz Information, and in 1942, co-produced Bunk Johnson. (Note: Eugene Williams (1918–1948) – see a short biographical note on Gene Williams (1918–1948) in Bill Russell's American Music (BRAM), compiled and edited by Mike Hazeldine, Jazzology Press (1993), p. 170; ISBN 9780963889003; OCLC 1050495610, 939852788)

== Life and education ==
Williams was born in Manhattan, New York. He enrolled at Columbia College, Columbia University, in 1934 and graduated with a Bachelor of Arts in 1938.

In June 1938, as a senior at Columbia, Williams was one of two recipients to win the Philolexian Prize for excellence in prose and poetry. The Philolexian Society was, at the time, one of the three oldest literary societies in America. Williams received the prose prize for his essay, "The Elements of Jazz". The other recipient, Ralph Toledano, president of the Philolexian Society, won the poetry prize for his 28-line poem, "Primavera". The judges were Jacques Barzun, instructor of history, and Howard Theodric Westbrook (1900–1944), instructor in Greek and Latin.

=== Columbia cohorts ===
Williams' contemporaries at Columbia included:

- Ralph Gleason, in 1939 co-founded with Williams Jazz Information, and in 1967, co-founded Rolling Stone
- Walter Elliott Schaap (1917–2005) (CC class of 1937), noted pioneering jazz historian, father of Phil Schaap, radio personality and jazz historian.
- Ralph de Toledano, in 1939 co-founded with Williams Jazz Information
- Barry Ulanov (CC class of 1939) was editor of Metronome Magazine from 1943 to 1955

=== Family and death ===
Eugene's father, Joseph Williams (1879–1934), died when he was 16. His mother, Anna Freid (maiden; 1885–1940), died when he was 21. He had only one sibling, a sister, Josephine Williams (1915–1983), who had been married to Joseph Akibba Turitz (1905–1956).

Williams died May 5, 1948, in Manhattan and his body was cremated May 10, 1948, at Fresh Pond Crematory and Columbarium, located in Middle Village, New York.

== Selected work ==
Articles

- "Omer Simeon" (Omer Simeon), by Herman Rosenberg & Eugene Williams, Vol. 2, No. 1, July 26, 1940, pp. 8–9
- "New Orleans Clarinets: 2 – Edmond Hall" (Edmond Hall), by Herman Rosenberg & Eugene Williams, Vol. 2, No. 2, August 9, 1940
- "A History of Jazz Information" (transcript), by Eugene Williams, Vol. 2, November 1941, pp. 93–101

Books (contributor)

- Jazzways, George Sigmund Rosenthal (1922–1967) & Frank Zachary (né Frank Zaharija; 1914–2015) (eds.) (© 21 January 1946; Jazzways, Cincinnati) (more than 100 photos by Skippy Adelman, Bernice Abbott, and Sargent John Marsh; 1916–2003)

Cincinnati: Jazzways (1946); OCLC 10396118, 367353290, 839356128, 979896906
New York: Greenberg (1946, 1947); OCLC 3501413, 21397381, 611017552
London: Musicians Press Ltd. (1947); OCLC 654341520, 28753218, 795465371, 774482619
(Greenberg, Publisher, founded in 1924 by Jacob Walter Greenberg; 1894–1974; & David Benjamin Greenberg; 1892–1968; sold to Chilton Book Company in 1958)

Vol. 1: 9th of 10 articles – "New Orleans Today," by Eugene Williams & Julius "Skippy" Adelman (1924–2004) (photographer). Note: Adelman later gave up photography. Philadelphia jazz critic Nels Nelson (né Nels Robert Nelson; 1923–1996) wrote in 1985 that Adelman was among the greatest jazz photographers in the world. (Note: Nels Nelson (né Nels Robert Nelson; 1923–1996) was a jazz columnist for the Philadelphia Daily News for over 40 years. He retired from the Daily News in 1995 and passed away the following year.) In 1990, Nelson wrote that renowned jazz photographer "[Bill] Gottlieb ranks second only to the elusive Skippy Adelman in his capacity for capturing the moment."
Vol. 2: 9th of 16 articles – "New Orleans Today," by Eugene Williams & Julius "Skippy" Adelman (photographer)

Discography (sleeve notes)

- Bunk Johnson's Jazz Band

Recorded October 2, 1942, New Orleans
Musicians: Bunk Johnson (trumpet); Lawrence Marrero (banjo); Chester Zardis (double bass); George Lewis (clarinet); Albert Warner (trombone); Walter Decou (né Walter Louis Decou; 1896–1966) (piano); Edgar Mosley (drums)
Production: Welch (album cover); Eugene Williams (recording engineer & producer); Eugene Williams (sleeve notes)
Melodisc MLP 12–112 (re-issue)
Pressed by Orlake Records (Note: Orlake Records was a label founded by Orlake, a subsidiary of plastics company Movilex Ltd. when they opened their first pressing plant in Dagenham, Essex in 1964.)
