= Riverside Records =

American record label

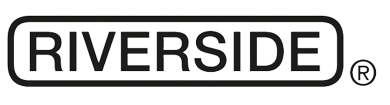
- Founded: 1953
- Founder: Bill Grauer, Jr; Orrin Keepnews
- Defunct: 1964
- Status: Defunct
- Genre: Jazz, blues, folk
- Country of origin: U.S.
- Location: New York City

Riverside Records was an American jazz record company and label. Founded by Orrin Keepnews and Bill Grauer, Jr, under his firm Bill Grauer Productions in 1953, the label played an important role in the jazz record industry for a decade. Riverside headquarters were located in New York City, at 553 West 51st Street.

== History ==
Initially the company was dedicated to reissuing early jazz material drawn from the issues of the Paramount and Gennett and Hot Record Society (H.R.S.), labels among others. Reissued artists included Jelly Roll Morton, King Oliver, Ma Rainey, and James P. Johnson, but the label began issuing its own contemporary jazz recordings in April 1954, beginning with pianist Randy Weston. In 1955 the Prestige Records contract of Thelonious Monk was bought out and Monk was signed by Riverside, where he remained for the next five years. During the next few years, Cannonball Adderley, Bill Evans, Charlie Byrd, Johnny Griffin, and Wes Montgomery made substantial contributions to Riverside's catalog. Most new records were produced by Keepnews, who served as creative head of the label and several subsidiaries, such as Jazzland Records, with Grauer directing the company's sales and business operations. Judson was another subsidiary label which mainly concentrated on musical genres other than jazz.

Riverside offered an extensive folk catalog, including traditional performers like Bascom Lamar Lunsford, Obray Ramsey, and George Pegram and Walter Parham; and folk interpreters like Ewan MacColl, Jean Ritchie, Paul Clayton, Billy Faier, Oscar Brand, Cynthia Gooding and Bob Gibson.

In 1956, Bill Grauer recorded, produced and edited the racing sounds of the Florida International Twelve-Hour Grand Prix of Endurance, Riverside Records RLP 5001. The record also contains interviews with Stirling Moss, Juan Manuel Fangio and other racing drivers.

== Living Legends ==
In 1960–61 Riverside produced an acclaimed series of albums featuring jazz and blues veterans such as Jim Robinson, Sweet Emma Barrett and Alberta Hunter. The objective was to record musicians before their artistry was lost forever. Indeed, many were no longer active, and thus their union memberships had expired. Recognizing the importance of the project, the American Federation of Musicians suspended its union shop rules on their behalf. This "Living Legends" series was initially recorded in New Orleans. Later sessions were recorded in Chicago. The sessions took place at Societé des Jeunes Amis Hall, built in the 1800s. According to the producer, Chris Albertson, the hall was a "Creole fraternal headquarters and it proved to have every advantage over a studio; apart from its live sound, it gave the performers familiar surroundings... The hall's acoustical sound was exactly what I wanted to recapture: the same kind of ambience that lent such character to Bill Russell's 1940s American Music recordings from San Jacinto Hall." One of the musicians invited to participate was Louis Cottrell, Jr. Cottrell organized a trio comprising McNeal Breaux, Alcide "Slow Drag" Pavageau with Emanuel Sayles sitting in playing guitar and banjo. The band was so well received that they continued to play together. The music on this album has been described as "more polite and subtle than the city's 'downtown' music... an intimate, low-key delight." Cottrell's playing has also been well received:

[In 1961] Cottrell recorded a masterwork, entitled New Orleans: The Living Legends, which was reissued in 1994. To hear it is to conjure up the elegance of a bygone era by a man who did much to create it. From the opening note on "Bourbon Street Parade," to the charming "Three Little Words," to the reverent "What a Friend We Have in Jesus," the listener is hearing the living history of jazz.

== Riverside Wonderland ==
Under the subsidiary label Riverside Wonderland, the company also produced a series of children's albums, the Grandpa Magic series of albums starring Ed Wynn, including two Alec Templeton albums, an album of Martyn Green reading from the Arabian Nights, and a six-record album set of the complete Alice in Wonderland, narrated by Cyril Ritchard, a rarity in the LP era when books were seldom recorded complete. An album of excerpts from the book was also issued, and the six records in the complete set were also issued as separate volumes. Riverside Wonderland also acquired U.S. rights to package and distribute musical recordings produced in England by Fiona Bentley, including The First Christmas with Dame Edith Evans, Musical Zoo with The Mike Sammes Singers, and Beatrix Potter stories narrated by Vivien Leigh. The British recordings were licensed by A.A. Records in the seventies, when that company was transitioning from Golden Records to Wonderland Records (no connection to Riverside).

== End ==
Grauer died of a sudden heart attack in December 1963, and the company filed for voluntary bankruptcy in July 1964. The catalogue was taken over by ABC Records, which reissued some of it, but virtually all Riverside masters were acquired by Fantasy Records in 1972. The majority of this material was subsequently reissued on LP on the Milestone label and as part of Fantasy's Original Jazz Classics series from the 1980s on CD. The Riverside catalog is now owned by the Concord label group.
