= Jazzmen =

1939 book ed. by F. Ramsey and C. Edward Smith

- Editors: Frederic Ramsey, Jr., Charles Edward Smith
- Language: English
- Genre: Non-fiction
- Publisher: Harcourt, Brace & Company
- Publication date: 1939
- Publication place: United States
- Media type: Print

Jazzmen is a book on the history of jazz. It was edited by Frederic Ramsey, Jr. and Charles Edward Smith, and was published by Harcourt, Brace & Company in 1939. It was the first jazz history book published in the United States and helped establish a story of early jazz as well as renewing interest in those forms of music and their players.

== Background ==
Frederic Ramsey, Jr. was employed by Harcourt, Brace & Company, and in 1937 was asked to read a manuscript that been submitted by the musician Ted Lewis. Unimpressed by Lewis's claim to have been a jazz pioneer, the young editor reported to his superior that he could write a better history of the music than Lewis had. The senior editor then suggested that he do so.

"In the spring of 1939, the jazz writer Charles Edward Smith spent several weeks in New Orleans, as part of the research he and other writers were doing for the book Jazzmen. He found the inspiration for his writing not only by talking with the veteran musicians who could take him back to the old days, but also by hanging out in the clubs that still were open".

== Authors and contents ==
"Nine writers contributed chapters to the book – Charles Edward Smith, Frederic Ramsey Jr., William Russell, Stephen W. Smith, E. Sims Campbell, Edward J. Nichols, Wilder Hobson, Otis Ferguson, and Roger Pryor Dodge". The book was edited by Charles Edward Smith and Ramsey.

The topics of the chapters included: Bix Beiderbecke; boogie woogie; and jazz played by white musicians in Chicago. Charles Edward Smith wrote "the highly charged romantic evocations of the scene for each of the four settings of the book: New Orleans, Chicago, New York, and the jazz environment everywhere in the United States." The first section of the book – "Callin' Our Chillun' Home" – "created what has become the legendary account of the development of early jazz". There are no footnotes giving sources.

== Publication ==
Jazzmen was published by Harcourt, Brace & Company in 1939. It was the first book on jazz history to be published in the United States.

== Influence ==
One purpose of Jazzmen was to trace the origins of jazz, which was done in part by trying to find information about cornetist Buddy Bolden. Much of the account of Bolden's life that is presented in the book was later shown to be inaccurate.

According to writer Samuel Charters:

The story that emerged in the book's pages would not have achieved such immediate acceptance if it didn't fill a need for a myth. For its editors and writers it was an act of faith to create a story that would lend the beginnings of jazz in New Orleans a closer indebtedness to black musical sources.

The book also helped renew interest in an early form of jazz:

what followed over the next half century was a flood of recordings of what came to be known as the music of the New Orleans Revival. Within a few months of its publication there was interest in finding and perhaps recording some of the musicians Charlie Smith described in his final chapters about what he'd heard in the Mardi Gras bars and dance halls.

One of the musicians recorded was Bunk Johnson, who had been contacted by the authors in search of details about Bolden. Johnson, who had stopped playing years earlier and was living in poverty, had a career revival as a result.
