= Victor Lasky =

American journalist (1918–1990)

Victor Lasky (7 January 1918 – 22 February 1990) was a conservative columnist in the United States who wrote several best-selling books. He was syndicated by the North American Newspaper Alliance.

== Background ==
On January 7, 1918, Victor Lasky was born in Liberty, New York. He graduated from Brooklyn College in 1940.

== Career ==
In 1942, Lasky joined the U.S. Army and served during World War II; during that time, he did correspondence work for the army's newspaper Stars and Stripes.

After World War Two, Lasky joined the staff of the New York World-Telegram; while there, he assisted Frederick Woltman in writing a series of articles on Communist Party infiltration within the US, for which Woltman won a Pulitzer Prize for Reporting in 1947.

Lasky first came to prominence with his 1950 book Seeds of Treason, co-authored with Ralph de Toledano, in which the authors argued against Alger Hiss and in favor of Whittaker Chambers, with regard to Chambers' accusations both he and Hiss had been spies for the Soviet Union.

He was one of the first journalists to write a critical view of President John F. Kennedy. He expanded on this in his 1963 book JFK: The Man And The Myth, questioning Kennedy's wartime heroics on PT-109 and claimed he had a lackluster record as a congressman and senator. Lasky also wrote a similar negative book about Robert F. Kennedy.

Lasky's most controversial book was It Didn't Start With Watergate published in 1977. The author argued that the scandal that drove Richard Nixon from office was little more than a media event. He believed that the press disliked Nixon and subjected him to unfair scrutiny no other president had ever experienced. Lasky also claimed that Franklin D. Roosevelt, John F. Kennedy and Lyndon B. Johnson had used wiretaps on political opponents.

Lasky professed the greatest political "crime of the century" was not the Watergate scandal, but what he describes as the "theft" of the 1960 Presidential election.

In 1979, Lasky wrote another controversial work called Jimmy Carter: The Man And The Myth, asserting that Carter was one of the most inept presidents of all time.

Lasky's last work was Never Complain, Never Explain (1981), a biography of Henry Ford II.

== Works ==
Books include:

- 1950 - Seeds of Treason; The True Story of the Hiss-Chambers Tragedy (with Ralph de Toledano)
- 1960 - John F. Kennedy; What's Behind the Image?
- 1963 - J. F. K.: the Man and the Myth
- 1965 - The Ugly Russian
- 1968 - Robert F. Kennedy; the Myth and the Man
- 1970 - Arthur J. Goldberg, the Old and the New
- 1970 - "Say ... Didn’t You Used to Be George Murphy?" (with George Murphy)
- 1977 - It Didn’t Start With Watergate
- 1979 - Jimmy Carter, the Man & the Myth
- 1981 - Never Complain, Never Explain : the Story of Henry Ford II

Articles include:

- "How to Understand Communism," American Legion Magazine (August 1953)
