= Hot Record Society =

Hot Record Society (usually known as H.R.S.) was an American jazz record label, founded in 1937 for the purposes of reissuing out-of-print early hot jazz music. It was founded by Steve Smith. The advisory board included John Hammond, Marshall Stearns, Charles Edward Smith, Wilder Hobson, Bill Russell, Charles Delaunay, Hugues Panassié, and Sinclair Traill.

The company initially issued out-of-print works, especially from the ARC and Decca catalogs and collected biographical and discographical information. In 1938, it began issuing newly recorded jazz as HRS Records, and continued in this capacity until 1947. Among those it recorded were Pee Wee Russell, Muggsy Spanier, Sandy Williams, J.C. Higginbotham, Trummy Young, Sidney Bechet, Rex Stewart, Jack Teagarden, Jimmy Jones, Joe Thomas, Harry Carney, Dicky Wells, Buck Clayton, Billy Kyle, Russell Procope, Billy Taylor, and Brick Fleagle. It also operated its own record store in midtown Manhattan from 1939, which sold both used and new records. The label's output was later reissued on LP by Riverside (and OJC) and Atlantic. The recordings were reissued as The Complete HRS sessions in a 6-CD-box-set released by Mosaic Records in 1999.
