= Herman Leonard =

American photographer

- Born: March 6, 1923; Allentown, Pennsylvania, U.S.
- Died: August 14, 2010 (aged 87); Los Angeles, California, U.S.
- Education: Ohio University
- Occupation: Photographer
- Years active: 1947–2010
- Known for: Jazz musician portraiture
- Spouse: Elisabeth
- Children: Shana and David
- Parent(s): Joseph Leonard and Rose Morrison
- Awards: 1995, Honorary Master of Science in Photography, Brooks Institute of Photography; 1999, Milt Hinton Award for Excellence in Jazz Photography, Jazz Photographer’s Association; 2000, Excellence in Photography Award, Jazz Journalists Association; 2004, Lifetime Achievement Award, Downbeat Magazine; 2008, Lucie Award for Achievement in Portraiture
- Website: hermanleonard.com

Herman Leonard (March 6, 1923, in Allentown, Pennsylvania – August 14, 2010, in Los Angeles, California) was an American photographer known for his unique images of jazz icons.

== Early life and education ==
Leonard was born in Allentown, Pennsylvania, to Joseph Leonard and Rose Morrison, who were Romanian Jewish immigrants who emigrated from Iași to the U.S.

Leonard gained a BFA degree in photography in 1947 from Ohio University in Athens, Ohio, although his college career was interrupted by a tour of duty in the U.S. Army during World War II. In the military, he served as a medical technician in Burma while attached to Chiang Kai-shek's Chinese troops fighting the Japanese.

== Career ==
After graduation, he apprenticed with portraitist Yousuf Karsh for one year. Karsh gave him valuable experience photographing public personalities such as Albert Einstein, Harry Truman, and Martha Graham.

In 1948, Leonard opened his first studio in New York's Greenwich Village at 200 Sullivan St. Working free-lance for various magazines, he spent his evenings at the Royal Roost and then Birdland, where he photographed jazz musicians such as Dexter Gordon, Charlie Parker, Dizzy Gillespie, Billie Holiday, Duke Ellington, Miles Davis, and others. The number of shots possible at a time was limited. Using glass negatives at this time, Leonard increased the sensitivity of the plates by exposing them to mercury vapor.

After working for jazz record producer Norman Granz, who used his work on album jackets, Leonard was employed in 1956 by Marlon Brando as his personal photographer to document an extensive research trip in the Far East. Following his return, Leonard moved to Paris, photographing assignments in the fashion and advertising business and as European correspondent for Playboy magazine. He also photographed many French recording artists for Barclay Records, including Dalida, Charles Aznavour, Léo Ferré, Henri Salvador, Jacques Brel, Jean Ferrat, Les Chaussettes Noires, Eddy Mitchell, and Johnny Hallyday.

In 1980, Leonard, along with his wife Elisabeth and two children, Shana and David, moved from Paris to the island of Ibiza, where he remained until 1988, when he relocated to London with his children. It was here that Leonard had his first exhibition of his work at the Special Photographers Company in Notting Hill. The exhibition was visited by over ten thousand people, including singers Sade and Bono of U2. The show toured the United States in 1989, and Leonard briefly moved to San Francisco. After an exhibition at A Gallery for Fine Photography in New Orleans, he fell in love with the city and made it his home for the next fourteen years, immersing himself in the city's lively jazz and blues scene.

In August 2005, Hurricane Katrina heavily damaged Leonard's home studio when the 17th Canal Levee broke near his home. The photographer and his family lost much property, including 8,000 prints, but his negatives were protected in the vault of the Ogden Museum in New Orleans. Following Hurricane Katrina, Leonard moved to Studio City, California, and re-established his business there, working with music and film companies and magazines. During this time, he received a grant from the GRAMMY Foundation, that allowed for his vast library of photographic negatives to be digitally archived for future generations.

Leonard's jazz photographs, now valuable collector's items, are a unique record of the jazz scene of the 1940s, 1950s and 1960s, and his collection is now in the permanent archives of American Musical History in the Smithsonian Museum in Washington, D.C. In 2008, Tony Bennett presented Leonard with the coveted Lucie Award at a ceremony at Lincoln Center in New York City. In June 2009, Leonard was the commencement speaker for the 2009 graduating class of Ohio University, at which time he also received an honorary doctorate.

He worked with musician Lenny Kravitz on a project in the Bahamas during January 2010.

Louisiana Public Broadcasting, under president Beth Courtney, produced the documentary Frame after Frame: The Images of Herman Leonard.

The BBC produced a film, (2011) "Saving Jazz", about Leonard's struggles following the Hurricane Katrina disaster in New Orleans. The film was directed by documentary filmmaker Leslie Woodhead.

In 2012, the GRAMMY Museum in Los Angeles presented a year-long retrospective, Herman Leonard: Documenting the Giants of Jazz.

In 2013, the Clinton Presidential Center in Little Rock, Arkansas honored Herman Leonard's work with a major five-month exhibition, Jazz: Through the Eyes of Herman Leonard. The exhibition included artifacts from many of the artists that Leonard photographed, including Duke Ellington, Louis Armstrong, Chet Baker, and Ella Fitzgerald. Clinton has said that "Herman Leonard is the greatest jazz photographer in the history of the genre." A keynote address was given by Leonard's daughter Shana Leonard and Stephen Smith.
