= Billy Douglas (musician) =

American jazz musician

Billy Douglas (1912–1978) was an American jazz trumpeter and vocalist.

Douglas played with Larry Ringold while young, both of them having been house in the same boys' institution. He played locally in his teens, and moved to New York City in 1932 as a member of Earle Howard's band. He played with Percy Nelson in Hartford in 1933-34, then played in the South with Jimmy Gunn. Don Albert picked him up in 1934, and Douglas remained in Albert's orchestra through 1937. Douglas did freelance work for a time, then worked with Earl Hines for several years in the early 1940s.

After 1945 he returned to New Haven, Connecticut, where he performed locally until his retirement.
