= Skippy Adelman =

Photojournalist from the 1940s

- Born: Julius Edelman; March 29, 1924; Manhattan, New York
- Died: May 1, 2004 (aged 80); Long Island City, New York
- Occupation: Photojournalist
- Known for: Jazz photography

Skippy Adelman (born Julius Edelman; March 29, 1924 Manhattan, New York City – May 1, 2004 Long Island City, New York) was an American photographer, best known for his book Jazzways, featuring monochrome photography of jazz musicians, and for his contributions to the bygone New York City daily paper, PM, where he worked as a staff photojournalist.

Adelman also worked as a stringer for Black Star and contributed photos to Ebony from 1946 to 1955 and New York Age around 1950. Adelman stopped photographing jazz musicians in the late 1940s and seemingly disappeared, perhaps because he began using his real name in 1953.

== Personal life ==
Julius Edelman's mother, Bessie Cohen (1896–1924), died 3 months after he was born. His father, Harry Edelman (1892–1992), a Romanian-born furrier in Manhattan, remarried on June 29, 1929, to Mary (born in Riga, Latvia, as Mera Weinberg; 1900–1993). Mary immigrated to the United States on July 3, 1923, and became a naturalized U.S. citizen on November 18, 1935. Edelman graduated from Stuyvesant High School in June 1941. Stuyvesant, then located in the Stuyvesant Square Neighborhood, was about 1.7 miles from his family's apartment on the southern border of the East Village, at 488 East Houston. In 1942, Adelman lived at 331 East 12th Street in the East Village.

Edelman was married to Dorothy R. Langer (1925–2021) for 57 years, until his death. Dorothy died shortly after and was buried next to him at the New Montefiore Cemetery, West Babylon, Long Island, New York.

== Career ==
Adelman was a staff photojournalist at the New York City paper PM. He also contributed his photographic works to other publications such as Black Starr, Ebony and New York Age. Adelman began using his real name professionally in 1953. For the Jazzways photographs, Adelman used a Rolleiflex camera loaded with Super-XX film and Speed Graphic with Super Panchro Press, Type B. For flash, he used Wabash Press 25 bulbs, setting the stops down to f 22, and shot 1/200-second. With the Speed Graphic, he used Wabash Press 40 bulbs with the diaphragm set at f 32.

From 1948 through 1952, Adelman wrote at least 24 short pulp magazine works (also under the name Skippy Adelman) that were published by the Chicago-based publisher Popular Publications. He wrote the music and lyrics for six songs and co-composed five more from 1952 through 1953 using the pseudonym Jack Smiles. He had a one-time acting role as a mannequin factory owner in Stanley Kubrick's 1955 film, Killer's Kiss, in which he was credited as Julius Adelman. Sometime before 1962, Edelman became a member of the Screen Directors International Guild, which merged with the Directors Guild of America in 1965.

As Julius Edelman, he went on to become an executive in various film production and advertising agencies, including:

- Executive Vice-President in Charge of Production (after a promotion from Assistant Film Editor in 1953) of Peter Elgar Productions, Inc. from 1953–1960.
- Production Group Supervisor for Ted Bates until about June 1963.
- Cowriter with Paul Mazursky of a teleplay episode for The Rifleman (aired March 12, 1962) – "Tinhorn" (Season 4, Episode 24; Overall Episode No. 134), directed by Lawrence Dobkin.
- Vice-President, producer, and Director for Mickey Schwartz Productions, Inc., which produced films for TV beginning around June 1963.
- Vice President & Executive Producer for Allegro Film Productions, Inc., from as early as 1965 to at least 1986, which produced of TV commercials. The company was also known for its short scholastic-oriented science films, such as the Science Screen Report (trademarked filed October 20, 1971). Allegro Film was a subsidiary of Sterling Communications, a forerunner to HBO.

== Disappearance ==
Adelman seemingly disappeared, perhaps because he began using his real name in 1953. In 1972, Popular Photography columnist Simon Nathan wrote that if he were given one hundred mythical dollars – 2nd on his list of 26 things to do – he would "have 1,666 six-cent postcards printed and write the whole world to try to find out whatever became of Skippy Adelman, the great photographer from the newspaper PM."

=== Critical acclaim ===
- In 2021, author Alan John Ainsworth wrote, "Few photographers were closer to the world of the 1930s and 1940s jazz than Charles Peterson and Skippy Adelman... Adelman, a Greenwich Village resident and one of a new generation of hard-bitten photojournalists, was as close as Peterson had been in midtown Manhattan to the swirl of activities around Condon... Adelman belonged chronologically to the new generation cohort but his life and work caution against pigeonholing all these photographers as young, college-educated members of the middle class."
- According to newspaper jazz columnist Nels Nelson (paraphrasing), "Skippy Adelman begat Otto Hess, who begat Charles Peterson, who begat Popsy Randolph, who begat Herman Leonard, who begat Chuck Stewart, who begat Robert Parent, who begat Burt Goldblatt, who begat Robert Polillo."

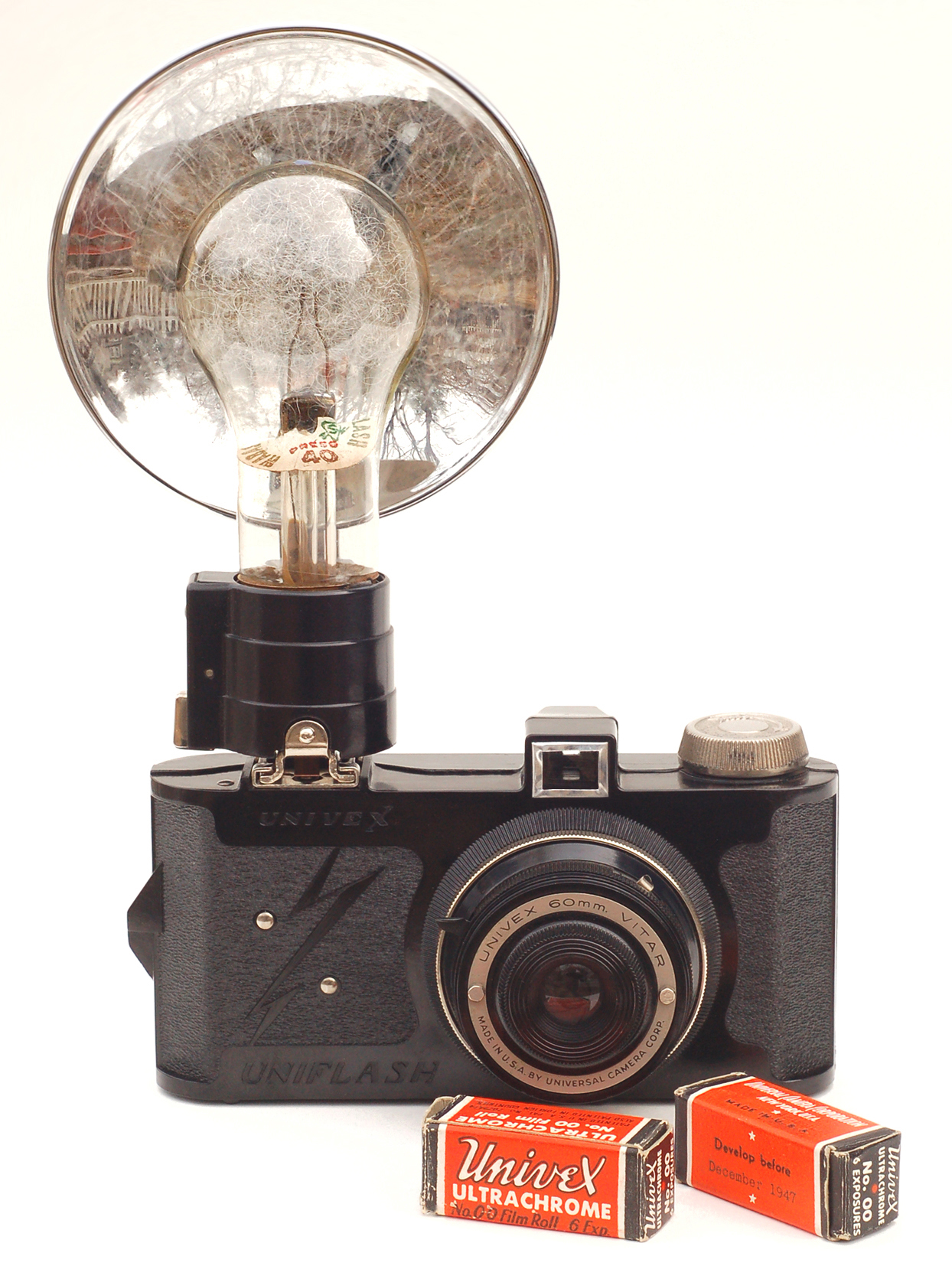
A different camera and different film (not Adelman's) with a Wabash Press 40 bulb

== Books ==
- Rosenthal, George Sigmund; Zachary, Frank, eds. (February 27, 2024). Jazzways – A Year Book of Hot Music (snippet view only). Cincinnati: January 21, 1946; Jazzways, Cincinnati. Cover design by Paul Rand. More than 100 photos by Skippy Adelman, Bernice Abbott, and Sargent John Marsh (1916–2003).

=== Selected Articles ===
- Cincinnati: Jazzways (1946). LCCN 46-20189; OCLC 10396118 (all editions); OCLC 979896906 (all editions).
- New York City: Greenberg (1946, 1947). LCCN 2021-560030; OCLC 63131051 (all editions); OCLC 611017552 (all editions).
- London: Musicians Press Ltd. (1947). OCLC 774482619 (all editions).
- Berendt, Joachim-Ernst (1956). Jazz-Optisch. Munich: Nymphenburger Verlagshandlung (de). OCLC 666432808 (all editions) The book includes 78 photos of jazz musicians. The photographers include Skippy Adelman, William Claxton, Bill Gottlieb, Otto F. Hess, Herman Leonard, and Francis Wolff.
- Anderson, Ernest, ed. (1946). Esquire's 1947 Jazz Book – A Yearbook of the Jazz Scene. New York: Smith & Durrell; A.S. Barnes & Company. LCCN 44-9505; ISSN 2767-0570; OCLC 473896644, OCLC 839357723 (all editions), OCLC 30986678 (all editions). The publication included an eight-page photo-spread of Eddie Condon's Sky Riders by Adelman. Criticism – directed towards Anderson, Condon's publicist, and Esquire – for publishing what seemed like a promo-piece for Condon was so severe that this issue stood as Esquire's last annual poll on jazz.

== Bibliography ==
=== Books, journals, magazines, and papers ===
- Ainsworth, Alan John (2021). Sight Readings: Photographers and American Jazz, 1900–1960. Bristol & Chicago: Intellect Books. ISBN 978-1-7893-8423-9. OCLC 1243352255 – via Google Books.
- "Broadway – Sterling Communications Names 2 Vice-Presidents". Boxoffice. Vol. 101, no. 23 (National Executive ed.). March 20, 1972. p. E3 – via Yumpu.com.
- Indicator "Julius Edelman" (Year Book). Manhattan: Stuyvesant High School. June 1941. p. 28. OCLC 50546336 – via Ancestry.com.
- "Sustaining Members – Of the Society of Motion Pictures and Television Engineers" – "Allegro Film Productions, Inc". Journal of the SMPTE. Vol. 75, no. 6. Society of Motion Picture and television. June 1966. p. 83 – via Internet Archive.
- Mathieu, Aaron Maximillion (April 1945). "The Hard-Boiled School of Photography: The Legend of Skip Adelman, PM's Picture Ace". Minicam Photography. Vol. 8. pp. 30, 33, 80, 82. ISSN 0096-5863. OCLC 1757544. Note: Mathieu was the founder of Minicam Photography.
- "Edelman Joins Elgar". Motion Picture Daily. Vol. 73, no. 1. January 21, 1953. p. 6 – via Internet Archive.
- Parenti, Tony (May–June 1960). "Tony Parenti's Story – The Years in New York: 1928/1950". Record Research. No. 28. Interviewed by Gillis, Frank; Morser, Roy Christian Jr. Brooklyn. pp. 2–4, 7–8, 9–10. ISSN 0034-1592. OCLC 04554179. LCCN sf79-10512, LCCN sv89-13740.
- Pelizzon, V. Penelope; West, Nancy Martha (2010). ""Crime Is My Oyster": Weegee's Narrative Mobility". Tabloid, Inc.: Crimes, Newspapers, Narratives (PDF). Ohio State University Press. hdl:1811/44630. ISBN 978-0-8142-1117-5. LCCN 2009032132. OCLC 759724208. Archived from the original (PDF) on May 25, 2023.
- "Jazz Pix". Popular Photography. Vol. 18, no. 6. Chicago. June 1946. pp. 54–55. OCLC 5517354 – via Google Books.
- Nathan, Simon Morris (July 1972). "Simon Says". Popular Photography. Vol. 71, no. 1. p. 64 – via Internet Archive.
- Price, Jack (December 30, 1944). "Photography: New PM Studio Plant Shows Good Planning – Housing and Equipment of New York Daily Help Efficient Operation". Editor & Publisher. Vol. 77, no. 53. p. 50 – via Internet Archive.
- "Esquire's 1947 Jazz Book". Book Review. The Record Changer. Vol. 6, no. 1. March 1947. pp. 8–9 & 15. OCLC 01774075 – via Internet Archive. LCCN 2003-223732 & LCCN 48-28187.
- Ulanov, Barry (March 1947). "Esquire Passes Out of the Jazz Picture". Metronome. Vol. 63, no. 3. pp. 22, 36–38. LCCN sf89091100. OCLC 19301720 (all editions), OCLC 761405288 (all editions).
- "Television Chatter" – "New York" – "Julius Edelman ..." Variety. Vol. 189, no. 7. January 21, 1953. p. 36.
- "Afternoon in an Office". Writer's Digest. February 1950. pp. 13, 38, 74. ISSN 0043-9525. OCLC 531780687. Aaron Maximillion Mathieu (1907–1996), founder of Minicam Photography, was the publication's business manager.

=== News media ===
- Nelson, Nels (November 22, 1985). "Some People Sweat Better Than Others". Philadelphia Daily News. Vol. 61, no. 162. p. 70. ProQuest 1827395706 – via Newspapers.com.
- Nelson, Nels (June 22, 1990). "Snap Judgements – Bill Gottlieb's Photos Are a History of Jazz". Philadelphia Daily News. Vol. 66, no. 70. p. 50. ProQuest 1834816535 – via Newspapers.com.
- "George Rosenthal, Photographer, Art Expert Dies". Post & Times-Star. Vol. 86, no. 139. June 2, 1967. p. 28 – via Newspapers.com.
- "'Fifth Avenue,' Winner ..." (PDF). New York Post. Vol. 142, no. 11 (Week-End ed.). November 28, 1942. p. 4 – via Fultonhistory.com.

=== Genealogical archives and government documents ===
- "'Mary Edelman' (1) "Certificate of Arrival." (2) "Petition for Naturalization." (3) "Oath of Allegiance." → New York, Southern District, U.S District Court Naturalization Records, 1824–1946". Naturalization (database with images). Petitions for Naturalization and Petition Evidence. Roll No. 954 (Petition nos. 247849–248205) → Citing NARA Microfilm Publication M1972, Southern District of New York, Petitions for Naturalization, 1897–1944. Records of District Courts of the United States, 1685–2009, RG (Record Group) 21. National Archives at New York. FamilySearch Images 1017–1019 (of 1106). 1935 – via FamilySearch (September 13, 2019).
  - Certificate of Arrival No. 2–370639
  - Petition date: July 16, 1935
  - Petition for Naturalization No. 248125
  - Petition Granted: List No. 4439; Certificate No. 3949679
- "Edelman, Julius (decedent)". New Montefiore Cemetery. "Section 3, Block 14, Row 10, Grave 12R – Society: ONLO Association Inc. His wife, Dorothy (née Langer; 1925–2021) is buried next to him in Grave 11R" The ONLO Association is a benevolent cemetery association of the Onward Lodge #487, Knights of Pythias of New York City.
- "Trademark Registrations Issued" – "Principal Register" – "Class 38 – Prints and Publications" – 949,369: "Science Screen Report" – "Allegro Film Productions, Inc.; SN 405,513". Official Gazette of the United States Patent Office. Vol. 905. December 26, 1972. p. PM 272 – via Google Books.
- 1940 United States Census (database with images). New York City → Manhattan Assembly District 6 → Block K → S.D. (supervisor's district) No. 14 → E.D. (enumeration district) No. 31–511 – Enumeration date: April 9, 1940 → Line 71 → Family 17. United States Census – via FamilySearch. "'Edelman, Julius' (son → age 16 → in household of Harry Edelman → at 488 East Houston Street)" Digital source → NARA digital publication T627 → Digital image 2 (of 18). Records of the Bureau of the Census, 1790–2007. RG (record group) No 29. Washington, D.C.: National Archives and Records Administration (2012). Roll 2635.
