= Fred Ramsey =

American writer on jazz and record producer

Charles Frederic Ramsey Jr. (January 29, 1915 in Pittsburgh, Pennsylvania – March 18, 1995 in Paterson, New Jersey) was an American writer on jazz and record producer.

Ramsey took his BA at Princeton University in 1936, then took jobs at Harcourt Brace (1936–39), the United States Department of Agriculture (1941–42), and Voice of America (1942). With Charles Edward Smith, Ramsey wrote Jazzmen (1939), an early landmark of jazz scholarship particularly noted for its treatment of the life of King Oliver. After receiving Guggenheim fellowships, he visited the American South in the middle of the 1950s to make field recordings and do interviews with rural musicians, some of which were used in releases by Folkways Records and in a 1957 documentary, Music of the South. He also curated an anthology of early jazz recordings for Folkways, entitled simply Jazz.

Ramsey was a staff member of The Saturday Review from 1949 through 1961. He worked with the Institute of Jazz Studies at Rutgers University from 1970. He researched Buddy Bolden's life with a grant from the National Endowment for the Humanities in 1974–75 and continued with a Ford Foundation grant in 1975–76. He presented early jazz interviews on National Public Radio in 1987.

== Books ==
- Jazzmen: The Story of Hot Jazz Told in the Lives of the Men Who Created It (1939)
- The Jazz Record Book (1942)
- Chicago Documentary: Portrait of a Jazz Era (1944)
- A Guide to Longplay Jazz Records (1954)
- Been Here and Gone (1960)
- Where the Music Started: A Photographic Essay (1970)
