= Bill Russell (composer) =

American classical and modernist composer and jazz historian (1905–1992)

William Russell (February 26, 1905 – August 9, 1992) was an American music historian and modernist composer. Named Russell William Wagner at birth, when he decided to become a classical music composer, he dropped his last name—as it already "was taken" by Richard Wagner. He was commonly known as "Bill Russell".

== Composer ==
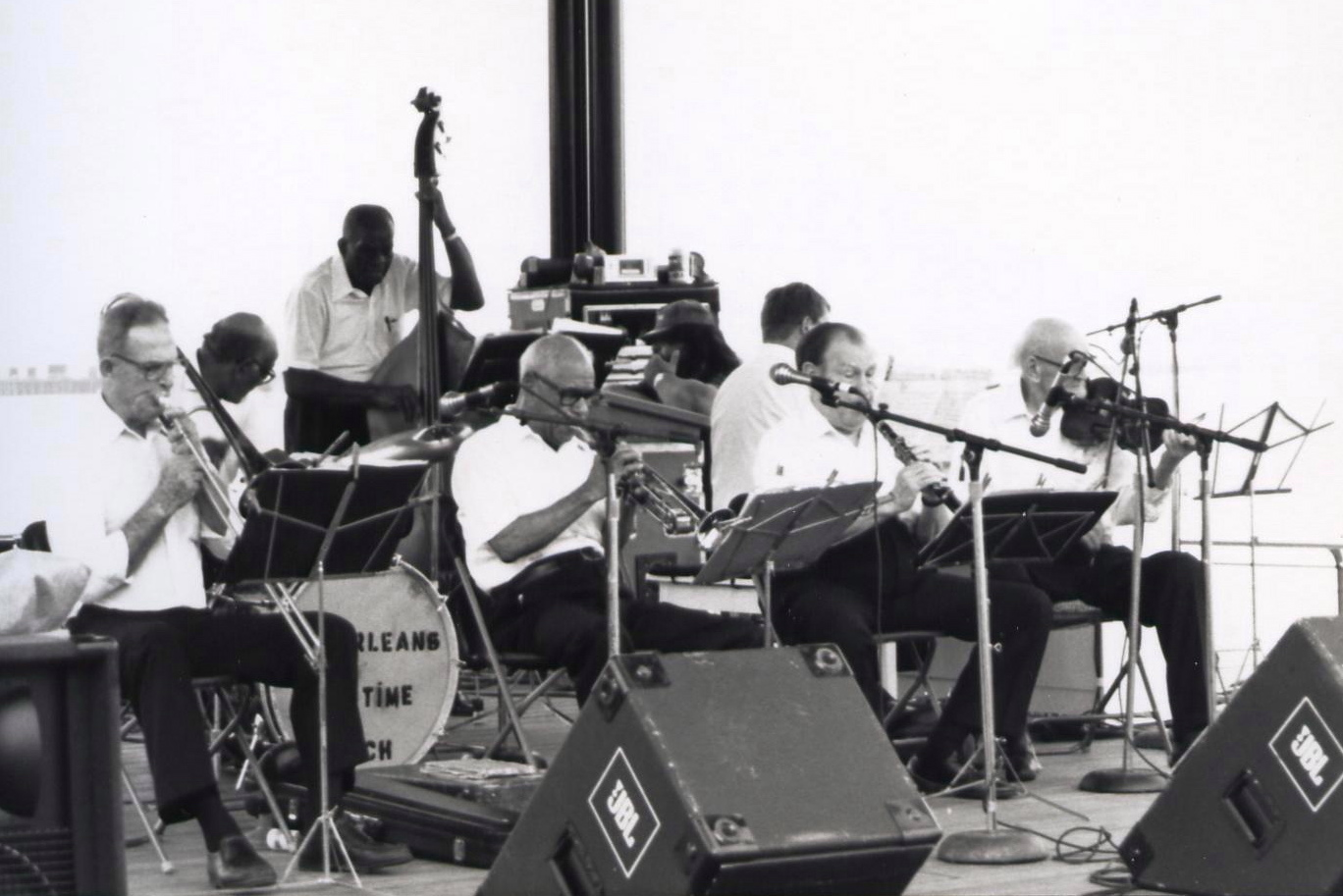
New Orleans Ragtime Orchestra performing in 1991, with Bill Russell at right on violin

Born in the small Missouri city of Canton, Bill Russell was a leading figure in percussion music composition, influenced by his acquaintances John Cage and Henry Cowell. In turn, Russell also influenced Cage, in his emphasis of percussion. During the 1930s, predating Cage's main work, Russell's percussion works called for vernacular textures such as Jack Daniels bottles, suitcases, and Haitian drums, as well as "prepared pianos", although it is not clear how specifically he wanted the piano to be prepared.

One notable performance of his "Fugue for eight percussion instruments" took place in 1933, with the ubiquitous and influential critic-writer-performer Nicholas Slonimsky conducting. The fugue was performed at Carnegie Hall on a program that included Varèse's iconic percussion composition "Ionisation." These performances took place under the auspices of the Pan-American Association of Composers, an organization which included Cowell, Ruth Crawford Seeger, Edgard Varèse, Slonimsky, and other composers of American ultramodernism. Russell, on occasion, performed other Pan-Am composers' chamber works on violin. In 1990, Russell's oeuvre was performed integrally, assisted by Cage, in New York, leading to a recording of Russell's extant works by Essential Music.

== Music historian ==
Bill Russell also was one of the leading authorities on early New Orleans jazz. He authored articles and books, including three essays in the milestone book, Jazzmen and the voluminous 720-page Jelly Roll Morton scrapbook, Oh, Mister Jelly. and he made many recordings of historical interest. Russell founded American Music Records, which helped bring many forgotten New Orleans performers, including Bunk Johnson, back to public attention. He became an important force in the New Orleans jazz revival of the early 1940s.

He moved to New Orleans in 1956, settling in the French Quarter, where he opened a small record shop and from which, he also performed violin repairs. Russell also played violin with the New Orleans Ragtime Orchestra.

In 1958, Russell co-founded and became the first curator of the Hogan Jazz Archive at Tulane University.

Russell collected a large quantity of material related to the history of New Orleans, early jazz, ragtime, blues, and gospel music, all of which he kept in his French Quarter apartment. During his lifetime he always was willing to share access to the material with serious researchers. At his 1992 death in New Orleans at the age of 87, he left the collection to The Historic New Orleans Collection, where it continues to be a valuable resource for researchers.

His obituary in The Times noted that: "Russell was the single most influential figure in the revival of New Orleans jazz that began in the 1940s."

== Sources ==
- Ramsey, Jr., Frederic and Smith, Charles Edward (Eds) - Jazzmen - Harcourt Brace Jovanovich, 1939. ISBN 0-15-646205-2
