= Ralph de Toledano =

American journalist (1916–2007)

- Born: August 17, 1916; Tangier, Morocco
- Died: February 3, 2007 (aged 90); Bethesda, Maryland, U.S.
- Education: Columbia University (Bachelor of Arts)
- Occupations: Journalist, writer
- Years active: 1940–2007
- Employer(s): Newsweek, National Review

Ralph de Toledano (August 17, 1916 – February 3, 2007) was an American writer in the conservative movement in the United States throughout the second half of the 20th century. A friend of Richard Nixon, he was a journalist and editor of Newsweek and the National Review, and the author of 26 books, including two novels and a book of poetry. Besides his political contributions, he also wrote about music, particularly jazz.

== Background ==
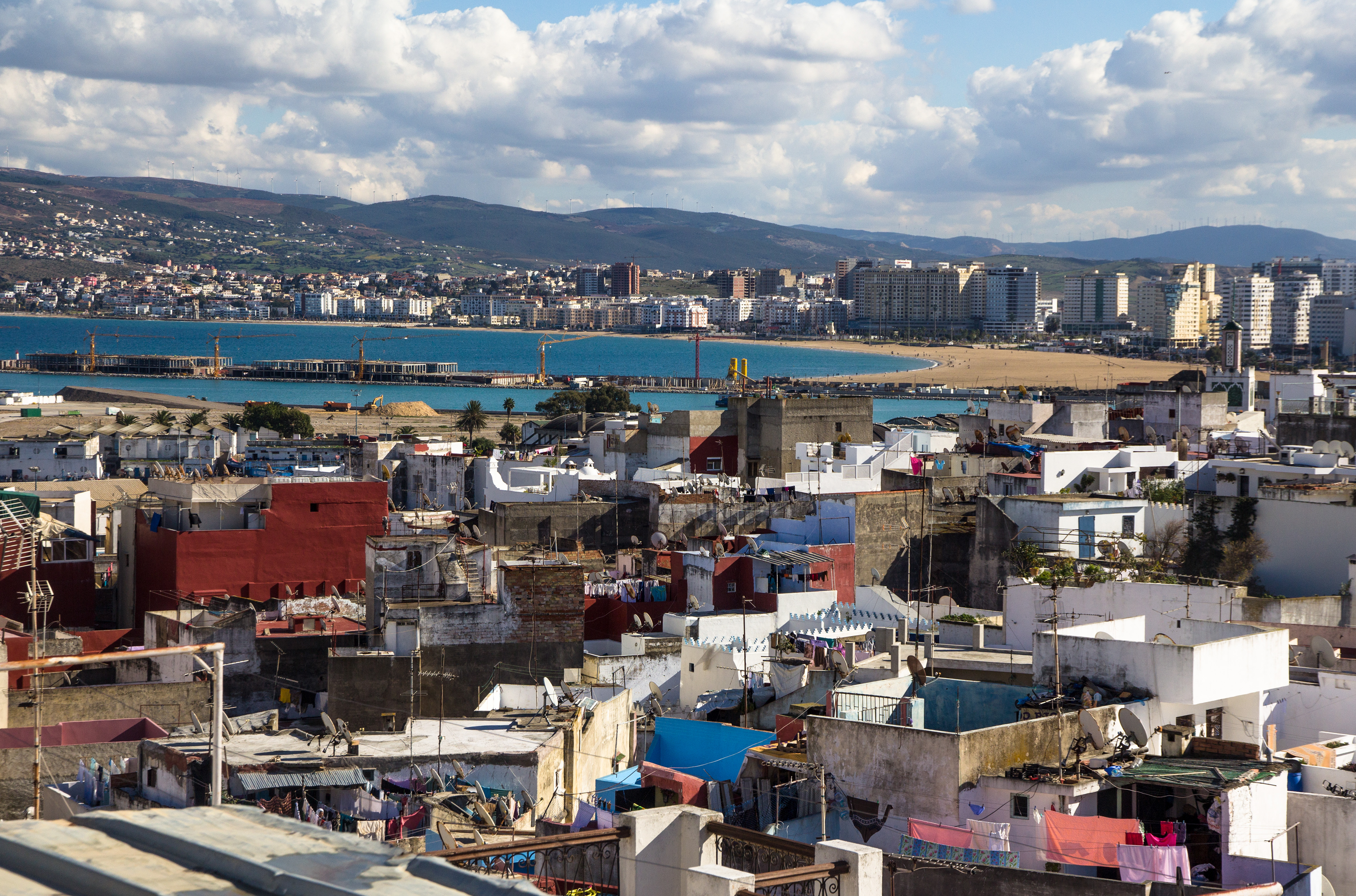
Toledano was born in Tangier (panorama)

Toledano was born in Tangier, Morocco, the son of Simy (Nahon), a former news correspondent, and Haim Toledano, a businessman and journalist. His parents were both Sephardic Jews and American citizens. Toledano was brought to New York at the age of four or five.

A proficient violinist from childhood, Toledano attended the Ethical Culture Fieldston School and the Juilliard School.

Later, at Columbia University, Toledano studied literature and philosophy; he also became President of the Philolexian Society, member of the Boar's Head Society, and a contributor to Jester of Columbia. In addition, he joined the Socialist Party of America, becoming youth leader of the avowedly anticommunist "Old Guard" faction led by Louis Waldman. The Old Guard left the Socialist Party in 1936. He graduated from Columbia University in 1938.

== Career ==
=== The New Leader ===
In 1940, Toledano became editor of the Socialist Party of America's magazine, The New Leader, succeeding James Oneal.

During World War II, Toledano was drafted and became an anti-aircraft gunner before being transferred to the Office of Strategic Services and trained for covert work in Italy. However, he was ultimately not sent to Italy, as the OSS felt he was "too anti-Communist to work with Italian leftists." After the war, he became a publicist for the International Ladies Garment Workers Union (ILGWU).

=== Plain Talk ===
In 1946, Toledano helped found Plain Talk with fellow journalist Isaac Don Levine and China Lobby funder Alfred Kohlberg. By 1946, the magazine focused on exposing Soviet "spy rings," "secret armies," and other communist subversion in the USA. Toledano served as managing editor or assistant editor. (In 1950, the US Senate reported that Emmanuel S. Larsen, investigated as part of the Amerasia spy case, had stated that Kohlberg, Levine, and Toledano had changed an article he had written for Plain Talk, specifically that "Levine completely rewrote the article," and later had asked Larsen to "go easy on the Plain Talk article" when testifying.)

=== Newsweek ===
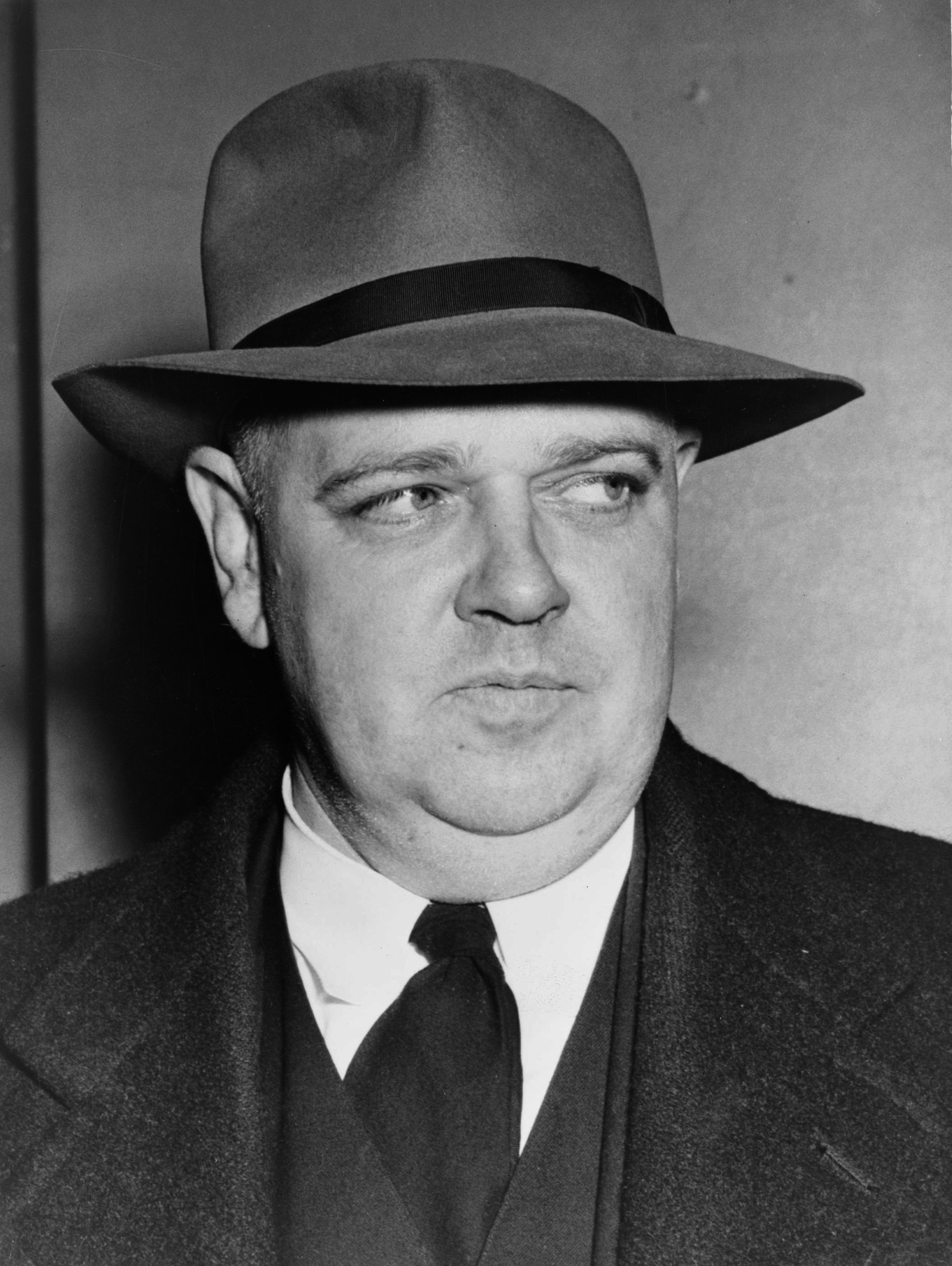
Whittaker Chambers (1948), whom Toledano befriended

Pursuing a career in journalism, after several journalistic jobs Toledano joined Newsweek in 1948. Toledano covered the 1950 perjury trial of Alger Hiss (Hiss being accused of being a Soviet spy), and in what the New York Times later described as "his political turning point," Toledano sided against Hiss and for accuser, Whittaker Chambers. Toledano cowrote an "intensely partisan" book about the trial, Seeds of Treason (with Victor Lasky), in 1950 and became a Republican. Toledano met Nixon during the case, and during Toledano's coverage of Nixon's 1950 Senate campaign, Nixon would have him address crowds, introducing him as the author of Seeds of Treason. Around the same time (October 1950–April 1951) Toledano cohosted the television series Our Secret Weapon: The Truth.

=== National Review and Human Events ===
Toledano was among the founders of National Review in 1955, and in 1960 began a column for the King Features Syndicate.

During the 1960s, Toledano became a major writer for Human Events and contributed several page-one stories.

In the 1980s, Toledano resumed regular contributions to National Review as a music reviewer.

=== Nixon ===
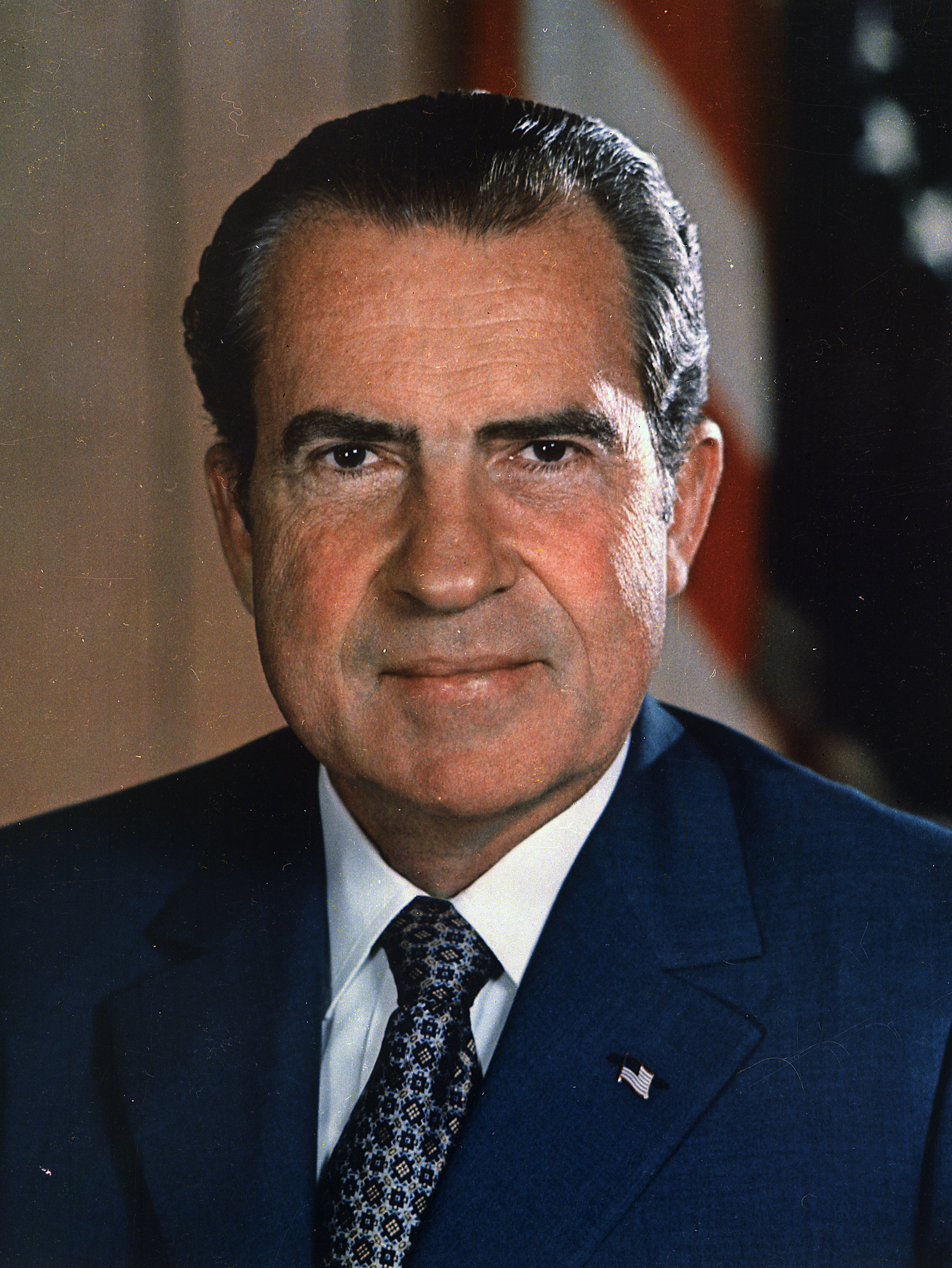
Richard Nixon (NARA), whom Toledano also befriended

Toledano met Nixon during the case, and during Toledano's coverage of Nixon's 1950 Senate campaign, Nixon would have him address crowds, introducing him as the author of Seeds of Treason.

Toledano's differences with his conservative National Review colleagues became very pronounced before long, first in 1960 when Toledano dissented from the other National Review editors when they endorsed Barry Goldwater, while Toledano supported Nixon. By 1963, however, Toledano had switched to Goldwater.

Years later when Nixon became president, Toledano was particularly close to the administration, in a rivalry with Daniel Patrick Moynihan over the privilege of being named guru of Nixon's domestic policies, which conservatives both supporting and opposing them as a kind of Tory socialism. Moynihan's victory in the struggle was likely a key moment in the rise of neoconservatism.

=== Legal issues ===
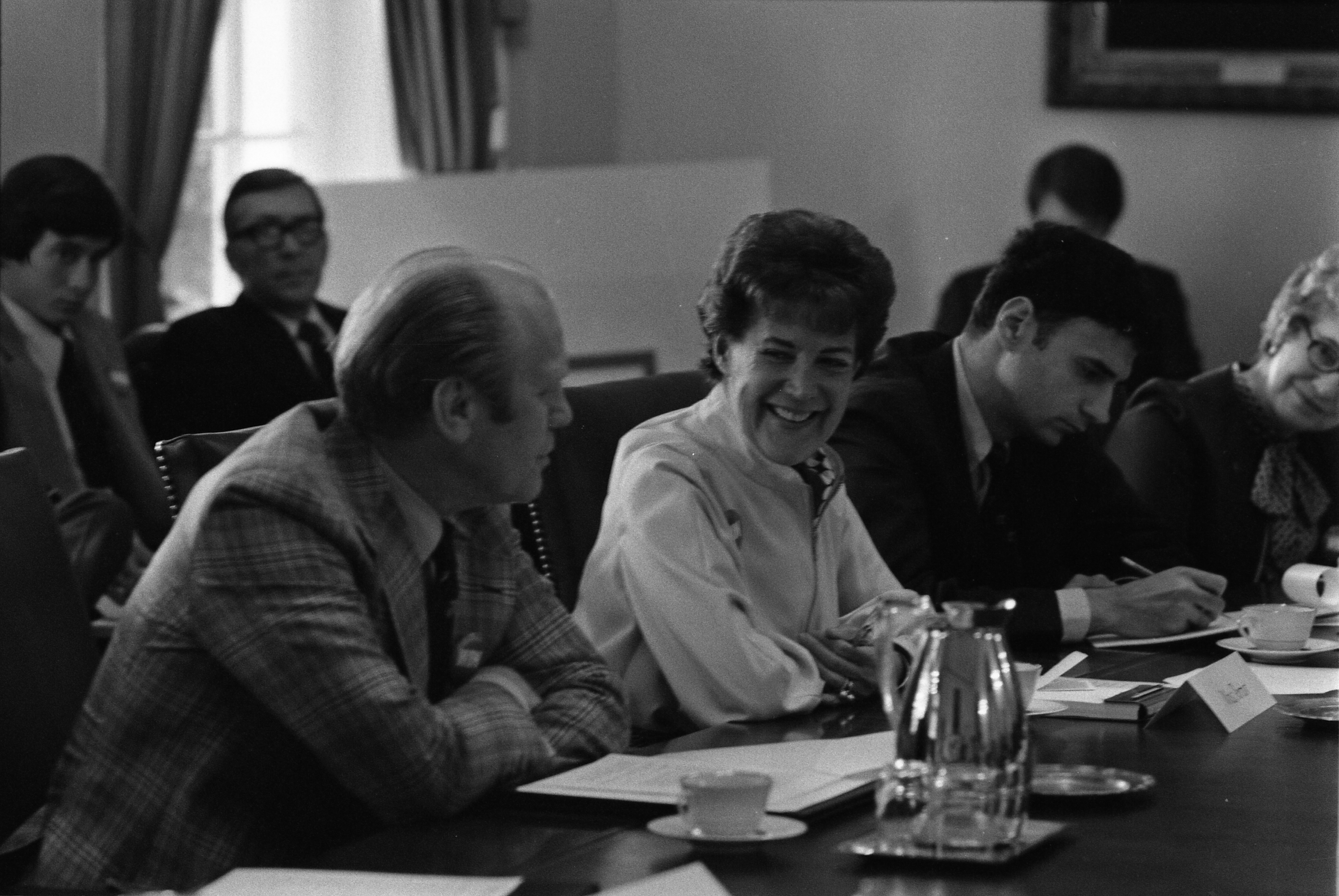
Ralph Nader (far right, at meeting with Sylvia Porter and U.S. President Gerald Ford in 1974) sued Toledano

A 1975 lawsuit by Ralph Nader against Toledano dragged through the courts for years, costing Toledano his life savings. The lawsuit concerned an alleged suggestion by Toledano, which Nader rejected, that Nader had "falsified and distorted" evidence about the Chevrolet Corvair's handling. It was eventually settled out of court.

In 2006, Toledano sued in connection with the rights to Mark Felt's memoir, The FBI Pyramid, which he had cowritten in 1979 without knowing that Felt was "Deep Throat".

== Personal life and death ==
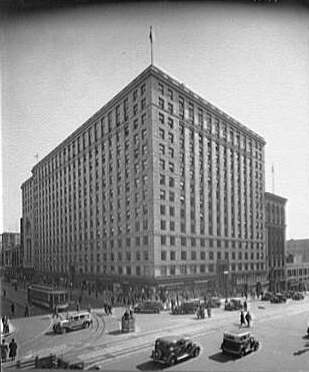
National Press Building, home of the National Press Club, Toledano's haunt

Toledano married Nora Romaine, with whom he had two sons, James and Paul. His second wife, Eunice Godbold, died in 1999

Toledano held forth until the end of his life at the National Press Club. There, in 2005, he succeeded John Cosgrove as National Press Club American Legion Post No. 20 commander. Toledano and first wife Nora were long-time friends of Guenther Reinhardt, another anti-communist journalist and frequenter of the National Press Club.

Toward the end of his life, he labeled himself a libertarian, according to his son Paul.

He died in Bethesda, Maryland, at 90.

Obituaries included:

- New York Times
- Washington Times
- Washington Times – "For Ralph de Toledano"
- Washington Post
- Weekly Standard
- Renew America Archived 2007-09-30 at the Wayback Machine

== Writings ==
In 1956, literary critic Irving Howe decried Toledano's biography Nixon for its "Cohn-&-Schine prose." In 2006, William F. Buckley, Jr. called Toledano's Cry Havoc "must reading... Toledano's best." Professor Paul Gottfried (a fairly frequent contributor, like Toledano, to The American Conservative) wrote, "Toledano uncovers continuities between the Frankfurt School's conspiracy and the rampant cultural terrorism in America." According to Martin Jay in Cry Havoc "the crackpot claim is actually advanced that the Frankfurt School was a Commie front set up by Willi Muenzenberger."

Books

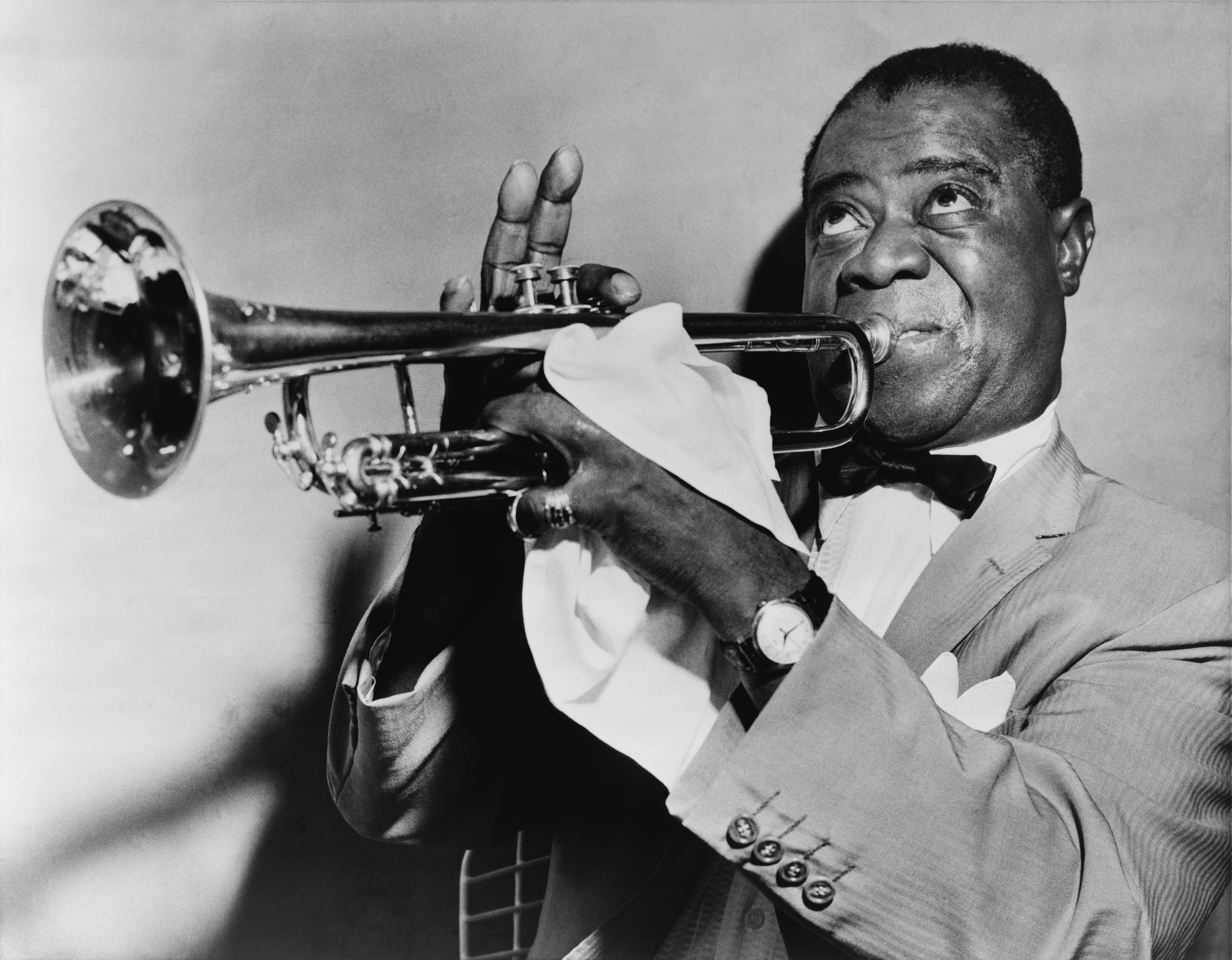
Louis Armstrong, jazz trumpeter and singer (1953) was a favorite of Toledano

Never straying far from his first passion of music, Toledano distinguished himself as an avid scholar of jazz. During the latter half of his long career at National Review, he was relegated to writing a music review column, on account of his growing variance with the direction of American conservatism. He also wrote about music a good deal (by no means only jazz) for The American Conservative in his last years.

Non-Fiction Books:

- Seeds of Treason (with Victor Lasky) (New York: Funk and Wagnalls, 1950)
- Spies, Dupes, and Diplomats (New York: Duell, Sloan and Pearce, 1952)
- Nixon (New York: Holt, 1956)
- Lament for a Generation (New York: Farrar, Straus and Cudahy, 1960)
- The Winning side, the Case for Goldwater Republicanism (New York: Putnam, 1963)
- The Greatest Plot in History (New York; Duell, Sloan and Pearce, 1963)
- RFK, the Man Who Would Be President (New York: Putnam, 1967)
- One Man Alone (New York: Funk and Wagnalls, 1969)
- J. Edgar Hoover (New Rochelle, NY: Arlington House, 1973)
- Let Our Cities Burn (New Rochelle, NY: Arlington House, 1975)
- Hit and Run – The Rise – and Fall? – of Ralph Nader (New Rochelle, NY: Arlington House, 1975)
- The Apocrypha of Limbo (Gretna, LA: Pelican, 1994)
- Notes from the Underground (Washington: Regnery, 1997)
- Cry Havoc: The Great American Bring-down and How It Happened (New York: Anthem, 2006)

Fiction Books:

- Day of Reckoning (New York: Holt, 1955)
- Devil Take Him (New York: Putnam, 1979)

Poetry:

- "Verse," Modern Age (Fall 1961)
- Poems, You and I (Gretna, LA: Pelican, 1978)

Music (Jazz):

- Frontiers of Jazz (New York: O. Durrell, 1947)
- Satchmo at the National Press Club: Red Beans and Rice-ly Yours: Louis Armstrong, Tyree Glenn, Tommy Gwaltney (Smithsonian Folkways Special Series, 1972) – liner notes for recording

Articles

Plain Talk (1946–1948):

- "Stalin's Hand in the Panama Canal" (November 1946)
- "Liberals' Awakening" (1946)
- "Is Native Fascism a Menace?" (1947)
- "Acid Test for AVC" (1947)
- "When Is a Red Herring?" (October 28, 1948)

Commonweal (1947–1948):

- "More Books of the Week: Expatriates End (Review): Cervantes, by Aubrey F.G. Bell" (December 12, 1947)
- "Mr. Wilson's Five Points (Review): Between Fear and Hope, by S.L. Shneiderman" (January 16, 1948)
- "The Screen: Where Men Are Men (Review): The Rise of the Spanish American Empire, by Salvador de Madariaga" (June 11, 1948)
- "As Others See It (Review): Politics in the Empire State, by Warren Moscow" (October 15, 1948)
- "Books: Machines and Men" Verdict of Three Decades, by Julien Steinberg" (September 1, 1950)

The Saturday Review (1948):

- "Autobiography in Time" (January 31, 1948)

American Mercury (1949–1955):

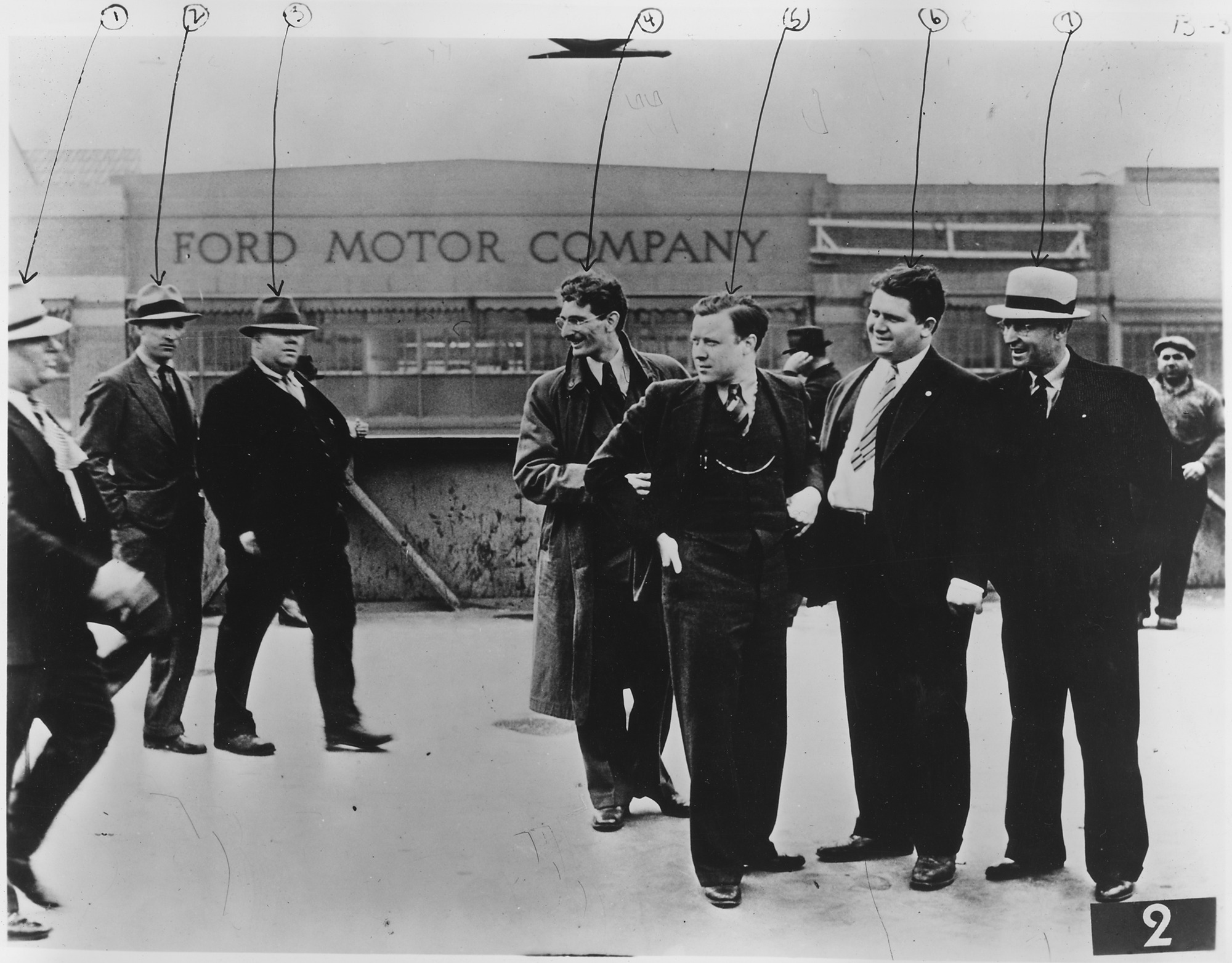
Toledano criticized unions and other allegedly communist-affiliated organizations and people, including Walter Reuther (here, during a strike on May 26, 1937)

- "Music: The Cult of the Conductor" (June 1949)
- "The Book Reviewers Sell Out China"(July 1951)
- "Gravediggers of America: Part II: How Stalin's Disciples Review Books" (August 1951)
- "The Soft Underbelly of the U.S.A." (February 1953)
- "The Sad Story of Lamar Caudle" (March 1953)
- "The Walter Reuther Story" (May 1953)
- "The Alger Hiss Story" (June 1953)
- "Junior's Misses" (November 1953)
- "America, I-Love-You" (July 1955)
- "ADA: A Democratic Problem (August 1955)
- "This We Face" (April 1959)

American Scholar (1950):

- "David Antiphons" (Winter 1950)

Colliers Weekly (1951):

- "Operation Storm! (October 6, 1951)

House Un-American Activities Committee (1956):

- "An Old and Not So Mysterious Line" in Soviet Total War (September 30, 1956)

National Review (1956–1991):

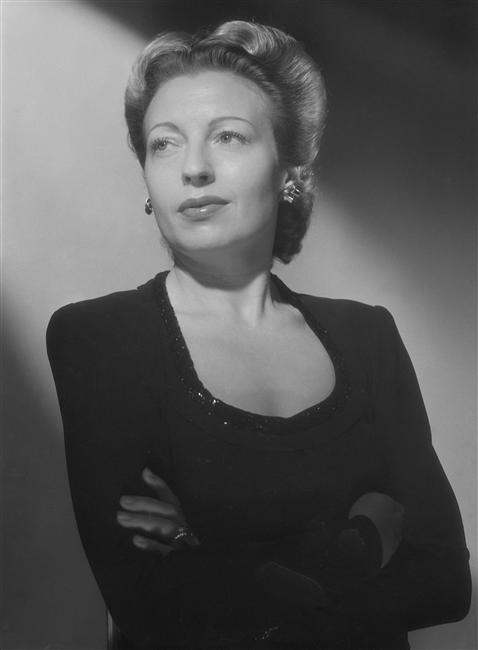
Toledano continued to write about music and musicians including Germaine Montero (here, 1946)

- "The Daily Worker Finds Friends" (April 18, 1956)
- "Notes for a Controversy" (September 22, 1956)
- "Phonograph's Career (Review)" My Record of Music, by Compton Mackenzie" (December 8, 1956)
- "It's Still the Soviet Party" (January 5, 1957)
- "The Hiss Maneuver: A Symposium" (May 25, 1957)
- "The Context of Liberalism" (November 9, 1957)
- "Arts and Manners" (December 7, 1957)
- "An Introduction to Violence" (February 22, 1958)
- "Music: Mr. Hume and Mr. Dragon" (May 3, 1958)
- "A Spy for Stalin" (May 24, 1958)
- "Books in Brief (Review): The Cloud of Unknowing, by Ira Progoff" (May 31, 1958)
- "Books in Brief (Review): American Moderns, by Maxwell Geismar (August 16, 1958)
- "Books in Brief (Review): The Autobiography of Mark Van Doren by Mark Van Doren" (December 20, 1958)
- "Books, Arts, Manners: In Defense of Congress (Review)" Congress and the American Tradition, by James Burnham" (June 6, 1959)
- "Notes on a Journey to Russia" (August 29, 1959)
- "The Artistry of Juliette Greco" (March 26, 1960)
- "Books in Brief (Review): The Disinherited, by Michel del Castillo" (April 23, 1960)
- "Records: Berlioz" (June 4, 1960)
- "Records: Billie's Blues" (July 16, 1960)
- "Records: The Masses of Victoria (October 8, 1960)
- "Records: The Art of Germaine Montero" (December 3, 1960)* "Wrong Target" (February 13, 1960)
- "Records: Masters of the Beethoven Sonata" (January 28, 1961)
- "National Trends" (March 25, 1961)
- "Records: The Perennial Ella" (March 25, 1961)
- "Whittaker Chambers" (July 29, 1961)
- "Records: Callas or Tebaldi?" (July 29, 1961)
- "Records: Empress of the Blues" (July 1, 1961)
- "Records: Jazz in the Thirties" (October 21, 1961)
- "The Poetry of the Beats" (November 18, 1961)
- "Records: Mozart's Statement of Faith" (March 27, 1962)
- "The State Department's Dangerous New Policy (April 21, 1962)
- "Records: The Decline of Richard Rodgers" (July 17, 1962)
- "Records: The Cult of Judy" (August 28, 1962)
- "What Goes, Mr. President?" (September 25, 1962)
- "A Shrug for the Human Condition (Review): The Golden Notebook, by Doris M. Lessing" (September 25, 1962)
- "Billions for Defense – How Much for Waste?" (October 9, 1962)
- "Records: A Matter of Listening" (October 9, 1962)
- "Books in Brief (Review): The Wound in the Heart, by Allen Guttmann" November 6, 1962)
- "Records: Stravinsky as Classicist" (December 18, 1962)
- "The Sad Story of Mildred Bailey" (March 12, 1963)
- "Cuba Story, Wraps off: The Great Deception, by James Monahan and Kenneth O. Gilmore" (April 9, 1963)
- "Records: Mark Twain, Obscenity, Folk Songs" (August 27, 1963)
- "Records: Pablo Casals" (May 21, 1963)
- "Records: Moussorgsky's Boris, Berlioz' Beatrice" (October 8, 1963)
- "A Poet is a Poet is a What (Review): A Precocious Autobiography, by Yevgeny A. Yevtushenko" (November 5, 1963)
- "Marginal Notes" (December 3, 1963)
- "If It's Goldwater v. Johnson, Who Will Win?" (February 11, 1964)
- "Books, Arts, Manners: When the Big Job Is at Stake, The Big Man, by Henry J. Taylor" (May 5, 1964)
- "Lodge: The Little Man Who Wasn't There" (May 19, 1964)
- "Records: The Duke" (July 28, 1964)
- "Records: From a Great Spanish Cancionero" (August 25, 1964)
- "The Race Issue and the Campaign: A Negro Minority vs. a White Majority?" (September 22, 1964)
- "Records: The Wonderful Musicals" (October 20, 1964)
- "Records: Gustav Mahler – The Sadness of Horns" (January 26, 1965)
- "Records: Henderson, Basie, and Big-Band Jazz" (May 4, 1965)
- "Records: Bach, the Baroque, and the Fuge" (August 10, 1965)
- "Records: Thelonious Monk and Some Others" (October 19, 1965)
- "Books in Brief (Review): Moscow Summer, by Mihajlo Mihajlov" (March 22, 1966)
- "Books in Brief (Review): Between the Stirrup and the Ground, by Holmes Alexander (December 26, 1967)
- "Books, Arts, Manners: Cesar Chavez – Fact and Fiction (Sal Si Puedes, by Peter Matthiessen)" (March 24, 1970)
- "Joe Rauh's Counterattack" (December 20, 1974)
- "The Excesses of Environmental Professionalism" (August 15, 1975)
- "Books in Brief (Review): The Long War Dead, by Bryan Alec Floyd" (January 21, 1977)
- "Karl Hess and the Doppelgänger" (June 24, 1977)
- "Labor's Free Ride" (August 4, 1978)
- Poetry: A Small Obituary" (April 3, 1981)
- "Sound on Disc: Jelly Roll Redivivus" April 2, 1982)
- "Organizing Catastrophe (Review): On a Field of Red, by Anthony Cave Brown and Charles B. MacDonald" (June 26, 1981)
- "Sound on Disc: The Great Benny Carter" (September 4, 1981)
- "Sound on Disc: Bach Goes to Town" (October 30, 1981)
- "Sound on Disc: The Vintage Jazz" (December 11, 1981)
- "Sound on Disc" (February 5, 1982)
- "Sound on Disc: The Best of Brahms" (February 19, 1982)
- "Sound on Disc: Again the 'Middle Quartets'" (May 14, 1982)
- "Sound on Disc: Bix, Cornet – Profit, Piano" (July 9, 1982)
- "Sound on Disc: Verdi Unadorned, Beethoven Straight" (August 20, 1982)
- "Sound on Disc: Four Greats of Piano Jazz" (October 1, 1982)
- "Sound on Disc: In Search of God" (November 26, 1982)
- "Sound on Disc: Bessie, Satch & Little Jazz" (January 21, 1983)
- "Sound on Disc: Five Concertos, Three Violins" (March 4, 1983)
- "Sound on Disc: Nostalgia: A Triple Helping" (April 15, 1983)
- "Sound on Disc: The Innovators" (June 10, 1983)
- "Sound on Disc: The Duke and His Music" (August 5, 1983)
- Miracle on Taiwan" (August 19, 1983)
- "Sound on Disc" (October 28, 1983)
- "Not Real, Not Politics (Review): The U.S. and Free China, by James C.H. Shen" (September 30, 1983)* "Sound on Disc: The Greatness of Billie" (December 9, 1983)
- "Sound on Disc: Performing the Sonatas" (January 27, 1984)
- "Sound on Disc: The Progressions of Jazz" (March 9, 1984)
- "Sound on Disc: Opera: Mozart and Verdi" (May 4, 1984)
- "Television: Concealed Enemies" (June 15, 1984)
- "Sound on Disc: Will the Real Louis Please Stand" (July 13, 1984)
- "Lifestyles: The Homosexual Assault" (August 10, 1984)
- "Sound on Disc: From Gothic to Baroque" (September 7, 1984)
- "Sound on Disc: The Jazz That Was" (November 16, 1984)
- "Sound on Disc: 'Papa' Haydn? Oh, Yes..." (February 8, 1985)
- "Sound on Disc: An Olla Podrida of Jazz" (April 5, 1985)
- "Sound on Disc: Bringing It Back Alive" (May 3, 1985)
- "Sound on Disc: The French Connection" (June 28, 1985)
- "Sound on Disc: Schubert, Mozart" (August 23, 1985)
- "Sound on Disc: Mozart & the Beat" (November 1, 1985)
- "A Siding in Compiegne" (November 29, 1985)
- "Sound on Disc: Cherubini & Other Matters" (January 31, 1986)
- "South Korea Comes of Age" (February 28, 1986)
- "Sound on Disc: The 'Smaller' Music'" (March 28, 1986)
- "Sound on Disc: Mozart at the Piano, Plus" (June 6, 1986)
- "Whittaker Chambers Remembered: The Imperatives of the Heart" (August 1, 1986)
- "Sound on Disc: Liszt & Romanticism" (September 12, 1986)
- "Sound on Disc: Jazz & Pop – The Real Legacy" (October 24, 1986)
- "Books, Arts & Manners: Spies in the Parlor (Review): No Sense of Evil, by James Barros" (December 19, 1986)
- "Sound on Disc: America's Real Music" (March 13, 1987)
- "Sound on Disc: Haydn, Beethoven & Old Instruments" (April 10, 1987)
- "Sound on Disc: Great & Imperishable" (June 19, 1987)
- "Sound on Disc: Jazz: From LP to CD" (September 25, 1987)
- "Sound on Disc: Bach & Mozart, Beethoven & Boyce" (December 31, 1987)
- "Sound on Disc: Moldy Figs, Rejoice!" (February 19, 1988)
- "Sound on Disc: Faure & Co." (April 15, 1988)
- "Sound on Disc: Duke, Django, and Throttlebottom" May 27, 1988)
- "Sound on Disc: Vivaldi to the Fore" (July 8, 1988)
- "Sound on Disc: Salute the Commodore" (August 19, 1988)
- "Sound on Disc: A Little List" (September 16, 1988)
- "Sound on Disc: Toward a Jazz CD Collection" (October 28, 1988)
- "Twilight of the Idol (Review): The Selected Letters of Richard Wagner" (September 2, 1988)
- "Sound on Disc: Stravinsky, Beethoven, & Others" (December 9, 1988)
- "Sound on Disc: From Hoagy to Nancy" (February 10, 1989)
- "Sound on Disc" (April 7, 1989)
- "Sound on Disc: Toward a Jazz CD Library" (May 19, 1989)
- "Sound on Disc: Beethoven, Bach, Tallis, & Others" (July 14, 1989)
- "Sound on Disc: A Small Gamut of Music" (September 1, 1989)
- "Sound on Disc: Musical Comedy, CD Jazz" (October 13, 1989)
- "Sound on Disc: A Requiem & Other Celebrations" (November 24, 1989)
- "Sound on Disc: Beethoven, Brahms & Others" (January 22, 1990)
- "Sound on Disc: Classic Jazz... & Schubert" (March 5, 1990)
- "Sound on Disc: Superlatives: Bach & Beethoven" (April 16, 1990)
- "Sufferin' Succotash (Review): Musical Musings, by Peter Beckmann" (April 30, 1990)
- "Sound on Disc: Gluck, Handel, & the German Sentence" (May 28, 1990)
- "Books, Arts & Manners: Chicken Little Is Wrong (Review): The Population Explosion, by Paul R. Ehrlich and Anne H. Ehrlich" (June 11, 1990)
- "Sound on Disc: Schubert, Purcell, Verdi & Others" (July 9, 1990)
- "Sound on Disc: Beethoven & the Piano Sonatas" (August 20, 1990)
- "Sound on Disc: The Road Back to Music" (October 1, 1990)
- "Post-Beethoven, Pre-Modernism" (November 5, 1990)
- "War and the New World Order (Review): War, Peace, and Victory, by Colin S. Gray" (January 28, 1991)* "Dr. Johnson Revisited" (July 8, 1991)
- "Sound on Disc: Composers and Critics" (February 11, 1991)
- "Sound on Disc: Jammin' with Jelly Roll, on CD" (April 1, 1991)
- "Sound on Disc: Mozart's Papas" (May 13, 1991)
- "Sound on Disc: Commercial Classics" (August 12, 1991)
- "Can America Bring Peace?" (October 7, 1991)
- "Sound on Disc: Haydn's Orderly Chaos" (November 18, 1991)
- "A Look at the Files (Review): J. Edgar Hoover: The Man and the Secrets, by Curt Gentry" (December 2, 1991)
- "Sound on Disc: Get Help!" (March 16, 1992)
- "Sound on Disc: Of Great Works and Great Modes" (May 11, 1992)
- "Sound on Disc: Piano Jazz, Plus – Old & New" (July 6, 1992)
- "The Intelligence Gap (3 Reviews): The Spy Who Saved the World, by Jerrold L. Schecter and Peter S. Deriabin" (August 3, 1992)
- "Sound on Disc: Opera Reconsidered & Mass Appeal" (February 15, 1993)
- "Sound on Disc: Recalling Bernstein on Mahler" (May 24, 1993)
- "Sound on Disc: Polyphony and Forward" (July 19, 1993)
- "Sound on Disc: Music's Sixes & Sevens" (September 20, 1993)
- "Sound on Disc: The Truth about Verdi" (February 7, 1994)
- "Sound on Disc: Beyond Good and Evil" (April 18, 1994)
- "Sound on Disc: Hidden Order" (August 15, 1994)
- "Sound on Disc: Prayer Lives" (October 24, 1994)
- "Sound on Disc: Improve Your Musical IQ" (December 19, 1994)
- "Sound on Disc: King Louis" (February 6, 1995)
- "Sound on Disc: Shall We Dance" (April 3, 1995)
- "Sound on Disc: Ah, Baroque!" (May 15, 1995)
- "Sound on Disc: Isn't it Romantic?" (July 10, 1995)
- "Sound on Disc: Back-to-Back Bach" (August 28, 1995)
- "Sound on Disc: Who Killed English Music?" (October 23, 1995)
- "Sound on Disc: Not-So-Plain-Chant" (January 29, 1996)
- "Sound on Disc: Callous about Callas" (May 6, 1996)
- "Not without Smear (Review): Not Without Honor, by Richard Gid Powers" (May 20, 1996)
- "Sound on Disc: Hear to Stay" (June 3, 1996)
- "Sound on Disc: Before, During, and After Baroque" (July 15, 1996)
- "Sound on Disc: A Pilgrimage to Berlioz" (October 28, 1996)
- "Sound on Disc: Salvaged from Schmaltz" (September 2, 1996)
- "Sound on Disc: Wunderkinger" (January 27, 1997)
- "Sound on Disc: Music from Heaven" (March 10, 1997)
- "Sound on Disc: The Enigma of Berlioz" (June 1, 1998)
- "Sound on Disc: Serious Music" (June 16, 1997)
- "Sound on Disc: From Chant to Flamenco" (August 11, 1997)
- "Sound on Disc: Two Verdis, Several Beethovens" (December 31, 1997)

Human Events (1948–1969):

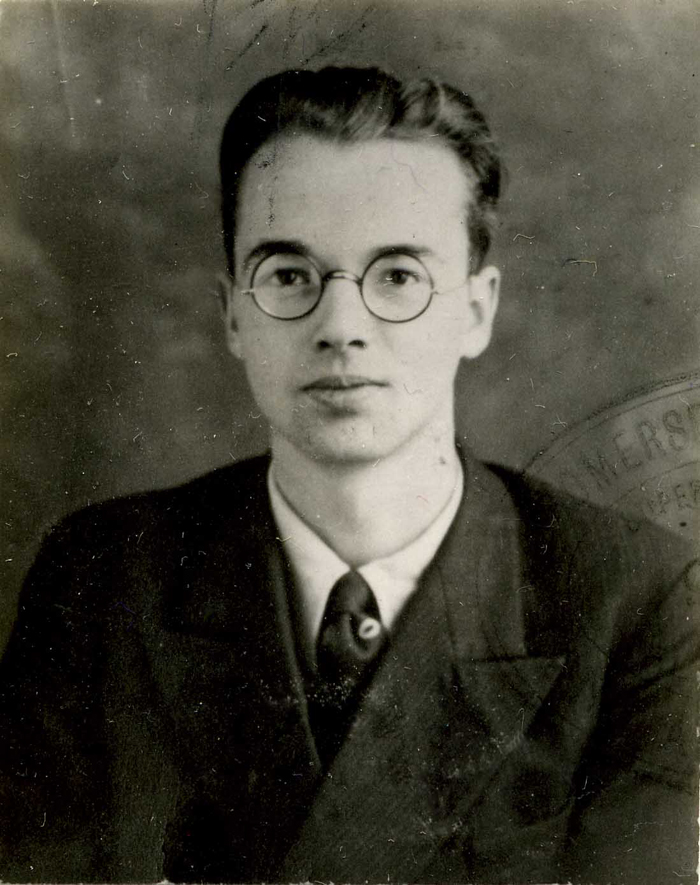
Toledano sought to expose communist influence for Human Events, including an Klaus Fuchs (here, in 1933 police photo)

- "Communism in Latin America" (February 11, 1948)
- "Is It So Certain President Johnson Will Win?" (June 13, 1964)
- "Mr. Truman Continues to Rewrite History" (January 16, 1965)
- "The Great Society – How Costly" (January 23, 1965)
- "Red China, the U.N. and Public Opinion" (January 30, 1965)
- "Sen. Church Still Worried About the 'Radical Right'" (February 6, 1965)
- "California and the '66 Elections" (February 20, 1965)
- "Those 'Harmless' Left-Wing Extremists" (March 6, 1965)
- "The Myths of Federal Aid to Education and the Facts" (March 20, 1965)
- "Red China's Record – A Challenge to Peace" (March 27, 1965)
- "Ten Pillars of Economic Wisdom" (April 3, 1965)
- "Red Strategy for Conquering All Southeast Asia" (April 10, 1965)
- "Foreign Aid – The Year of Decision?" (April 17, 1965)
- "But What About the 'Radical Left'?" (April 24, 1965)
- Education in the 'Great Society'" (May 1, 1965)
- "Harry Truman Speaks Out" (May 8, 1965)
- "The Real Story of the Dominican Crisis" (May 15, 1965)
- "Some Thoughts on the Supreme Court" (May 22, 1965)
- "Education Bill's Loyalty Oath Is Under Fire" (June 5, 1965)
- "The Great Society Imposes 'Tax' on Bread" (June 12, 1965)
- "New Book Raises Many Questions About Oswald's Way in Russia (Review): Portrait of the Assassin, by Gerald R. Ford and John R. Stiles" (July 10, 1965)
- "One of Every Five Dollars Spent Comes from the Federal Treasury" (July 17, 1965)
- "House Rollcall Looks Ahead" (July 24, 1965)
- "LBJ Must Consider Mao Tse-tung's Forgotten Memo" (July 31, 1965)
- "Will Arthur Goldberg Be Chosen '68 Vice Presidential Nominee?" (August 14, 1965)
- "Camp Atterbury in Indiana Shows What's Wrong with the Job Corps" (August 28, 1965)
- "LBJ's Aid-To-Soviets Policy Only Strengthens Red Muscle" (September 18, 1965)
- "Left-Wing British Poet Named to Library of Congress Post" (October 9, 1965)
- "Nixon Hits "Radicals of the Left'" (October 16, 1965)
- "Free Enterprise Victory in Turkey Pains State Dept." (October 23, 1965)
- "How to Win Elections: LBJ's $300-Million Boondoggle in Maine" (October 30, 1965)
- "The Consumer vs. the Federal Power Commission" (November 13, 1965)
- "The Penkovsky Papers" (Review): Why the Soviets Are Screaming" (December 4, 1965)
- "Inside Castro's Subversion Mills" (December 18, 1965)
- "Conservative Students Have Not Given Up the Fight at Berkeley" (January 1, 1966)
- "Facing the Facts on Automation" (January 8, 1966)
- "Coming: A Battle Over the FBI" (January 15, 1966)
- "Atom Spy Klaus Fuchs Tries to Stir Up NATO Trouble" (January 22, 1966)
- "How the Smith Government Is Faring in Rhodesia" (February 19, 1966)
- "Is Race the Issue in Rhodesia?" (February 26, 1966)
- "Reapportionment Fight Quickens" (March 5, 1966)
- "Labor Wants More From Congress: Boycotts and Picketing Head List" (March 12, 1966)
- "State Department Declares War on Rhodesians in U.S." (March 19, 1966)
- "British Abet Rhodesian Violence" (April 9, 1966)
- "United Nations Association Puts Out a Strange Magazine" (April 16, 1966)
- "Two Outbursts of Anarchy Rock Official Washington" (April 30, 1966)
- "Many Michigan Republicans Are Wary of Their Governor" (June 11, 1966)
- "The French Blunder in Viet Nam" (July 23, 1966)
- "Bureaucrats Know: The "Big Money" Is in Poverty" (April 23, 1966)
- "Will LBJ Swing Right or Left?" (June 18, 1966)
- "Liberals Would Weaken NATO" (June 25, 1966)
- "State Department Rewards Raymond's Disloyalty with Passport" (July 16, 1966)
- "TFX Returns to Haunt McNamara" (July 30, 1966)
- "The NLRB Rides Again – Against Industrial Peace" (August 6, 1966)
- "New Comintern Plans 'War' on Many Fronts" (August 13, 1966)
- "Ford Foundation TV Plan Poses Some Serious Problems" (August 20, 1966)
- "Disorderly Lawyers: Should the ABA Take Action?" (September 3, 1966)
- "Rules for Wage-Price Controls Are Already Drafted: Administration's Big Secret" (September 24, 1966)
- "The AFL-CIO's Tax-Exempt Status: Is It Legal?" (October 1, 1966)
- "America's Younger Voters: Are They Going Republican?" (October 8, 1966)
- "Does the White House Now Make Our Laws?" (October 15, 1966)
- "Democrats Begin to Admit Rationing Is in the Works" (October 22, 1966)
- "Does IRS Grant Tax Exemption to Law-Defying Unions?" (October 29, 1966)
- "Portugal Confused By U.S. Stand on Angola" (December 3, 1966)
- "Federal 'Data Bank' Could Destroy Privacy: Plans Already Under Way" (December 17, 1966)
- "Castro Confirms Existence of Secret Pacts" (December 24, 1966)
- 'The Death of a President' Is Very Bad History (Review): The Death of a President, by William Manchester" (January 28, 1967)
- "Labor's Plans for Congress: More of the Same" (January 28, 1967)
- "More on Hoover-Kennedy 'Bugging' Controversy" (February 11, 1967)
- Hoffa and the FBI" (February 18, 1967)
- "Manchester Book Installment Put Kennedy Forces in Bad Light" (February 25, 1967)
- "Needed: A Thorough Congressional Probe of CIA" (March 11, 1967)
- "A Dubious Dirksen Victory" (March 18, 1967)
- "How Two Possible GOP Candidates Are Faring: Reagan in California" (April 15, 1967)
- "State Department Distorts Soviet Treaty Violations" (April 22, 1967)
- "How the Soviet Lobby Pressures Congress" (April 29, 1967)
- "The Case of the Missing Wage-Price Controls" (May 6, 1967)
- "Why Americans Die in Viet Nam: Undermanned and Underequipped" (May 20, 1967)
- "Russia, Si – Rhodesia, No" (June 3, 1967)
- "'Long Hot Summer' Begins in Washington" (June 10, 1967)
- "Scandal Breaks Out in Electrical Union" (July 1, 1967)
- "U.S. Liberals Batted Zero on Israel's Quick Victory" (July 8, 1967)
- "Rocky's White House Strategy Becomes More Obvious" (July 15, 1967)
- "Federal Educationists Finally See Aid Dangers" (July 29, 1967)
- "New Signs of Trouble in the Middle East" (August 12, 1967)
- "TFX: Scandal That Won't Die" (August 26, 1967)
- "New Civil Rights Act: How Will It Work?" (September 2, 1967)
- "Who's Starving in Mississippi?" (September 16, 1967)
- "The 'New Politics': Mixture of Racism, Communism and Blackmail" (September 23, 1967)
- "Labor Joins the 'New Left'" (October 7, 1967)
- "Gov. Romney Goes Slumming for Votes" (October 14, 1967)
- "Air Force Association Plan for Ending the War" (October 19, 1968)
- "Once Again IRS Is Playing Politics with Tax Exemptions" (October 21, 1967)
- "State Department Misses Boat in Latin America" (October 28, 1967)
- "How McNamara Has Been 'Managing' the Pentagon: Scandal of the M-16" (November 11, 1967)
- "How Long Will the Nixon–Reagan Strategy Work?" (November 18, 1967)
- "How Television 'Creates' News" (September 30, 1967)* "An Insight into the Kennedy Method" (December 9, 1967)
- "LBJ's 'Little List' of Cabinet Changes" (December 23, 1967)
- "Rockefeller Off and Running for '68: But Plays It Cool" (December 30, 1967)
- "Bosch and the Liberals – A Dominican Post-Mortem" (January 6, 1968)
- "Free Enterprise Gives U.S. Highest Standard of Living" (January 13, 1968)
- "The State Department's 'Spend It Quick' Policy" (January 20, 1968)
- "The Eastern Establishment: Stronger Than Ever in Capital" (January 27, 1968)
- "Which Advisor Will Nixon Listen to This Year?" (February 3, 1968)
- "Plan in Works for New Central Security Agency" (February 10, 1968)
- "More Trouble Brewing in Puerto Rico" (February 17, 1968)
- "LBJ Strategy: Switch 'Surtax' to 'War' Tax" (March 23, 1968)
- "Will Smears Work This Year?" (April 6, 1968)
- "De-Mything Nixon's Past" (April 13, 1968)
- "Will Platform Writers Tackle Social Security?" (April 20, 1968)
- "AFL-CIO Pushes for New Executive Order" (April 27, 1968)
- "Is Bobby's Bandwagon Already Slowing Down?" (May 4, 1968)
- "Ed Partin: A Skeleton in Bobby's Closet" (June 8, 1968)
- "Nixon–Agnew and Negro Defections" (August 31, 1968)
- "'Charlie Green' Has His Problems" (September 21, 1968)
- "Conversation With A Mexican Farm Worker" (October 12, 1968)
- "Air Force Association Plan for Ending the War" (October 19, 1968)
- "The 90th Congress: R.I.P." (October 26, 1968)
- "Creating Another Nixon 'Conspiracy'" (November 2, 1968)
- "Administration's Rhodesian Policy Aids USSR" (November 9, 1968)
- "1960 and 1968: A Comparison" (November 30, 1968)
- "Day of Reckoning for Labor Bosses?" (December 7, 1968)
- "Herb Klein: Nixon 'Communications Director'" (December 14, 1968)
- "Grape Growers Tell It Like It Is" (December 21, 1968)
- "'Uptight': The Black Power Story?" (December 28, 1968)
- "Decline of American Naval Power" (January 4, 1969)
- "Poverty and Social Disorder: Was It Planned That Way?" (January 11, 1969)
- "Crime in the Nation's Capital" (February 8, 1969)
- "How Unions Are Moving to Trap the Farm Workers" (February 15, 1969)
- "Austerity and the U.S. Space Program" (March 8, 1969)
- "New Bombings in Puerto Rico" (March 15, 1969)
- "Featherbedding: A Soft Touch" (March 22, 1969)
- "One Judge Who's Tough on Criminals" (March 29, 1969)
- "James Earl Ray Case Still a Puzzle" (April 5, 1969)
- "On Internal Security, Liberals Play Ostrich" (April 12, 1969)
- "S.8 Would Compel Farm Workers to Join a Union" (April 26, 1969)
- "TVA and Its Expensive Compulsions" (May 10, 1969)
- "Will Congress Study Effects of Legislative Interference?" (May 24, 1969)
- "Empty Compromises on Federal Spending Cuts" (May 31, 1969)
- "Good Postal Service Still a Mirage" (June 21, 1969)
- "Battle of the Books--and Ad" (June 28, 1969)
- "How to Guarantee an Honest Election" (July 12, 1969)
- "Will Unions Be Included in the Tax Reform?" (July 19, 1969)
- "Why Should We Continue Foreign Aid?" (August 2, 1969)
- "Should Labor Unions Be Taxed?" (September 6, 1969)
- "Why Negroes Demonstrated in Pittsburgh" (September 13, 1969)
- "Anti-Americanism in the Philippines" (September 27, 1969)
- "Putting the Post Office on Its Feet" (October 4, 1969)
- "After the Stalemate, What?" (October 11, 1969)
- "AID Funds Private Group Pushing AID Programs" (October 18, 1969)
- "Behind the Post Office Reform Defeat: Exclusive Report" (October 25, 1969)
- "Behind the SIU's Mammoth Political Contributions" (November 1, 1969)
- "What Arab Terrorist Fear" (November 15, 1969)
- "Time Marches on Haynsworth" (November 18, 1969)
- "Questioning Gallup's Questions" (November 29, 1969)
- "Fierce Leadership Struggle Behind General Electric Strike" (December 6, 1969)
- "Vice President Agnew's 'Ten Commandments'" (December 20, 1969)
- "The Effects of GE Boycott" (December 27, 1969)

Modern Age (1965–1981):

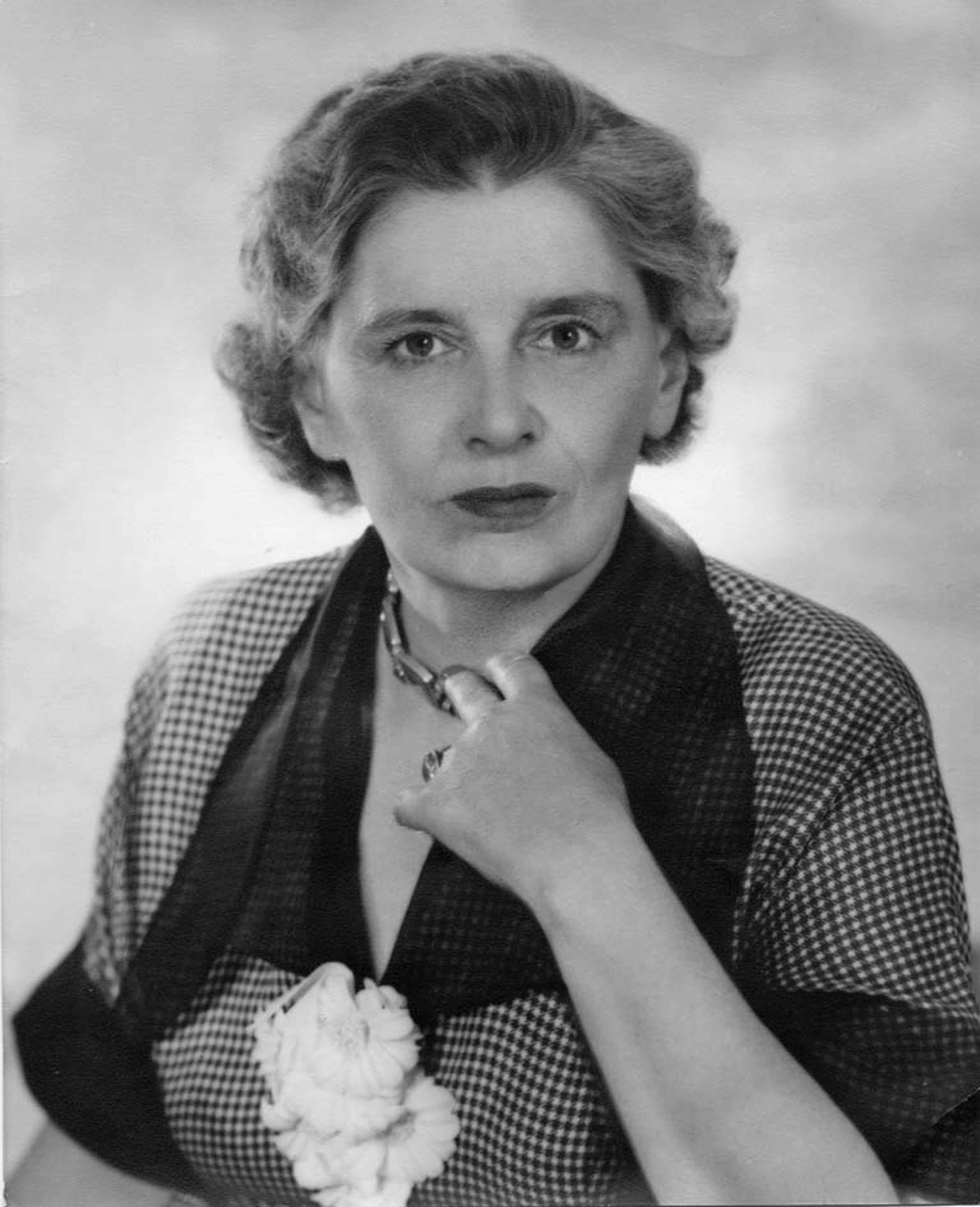
Toledano continued to attack communism in Modern Age by writing on books by anti-communist Rebecca West (here by Madame Yevond)

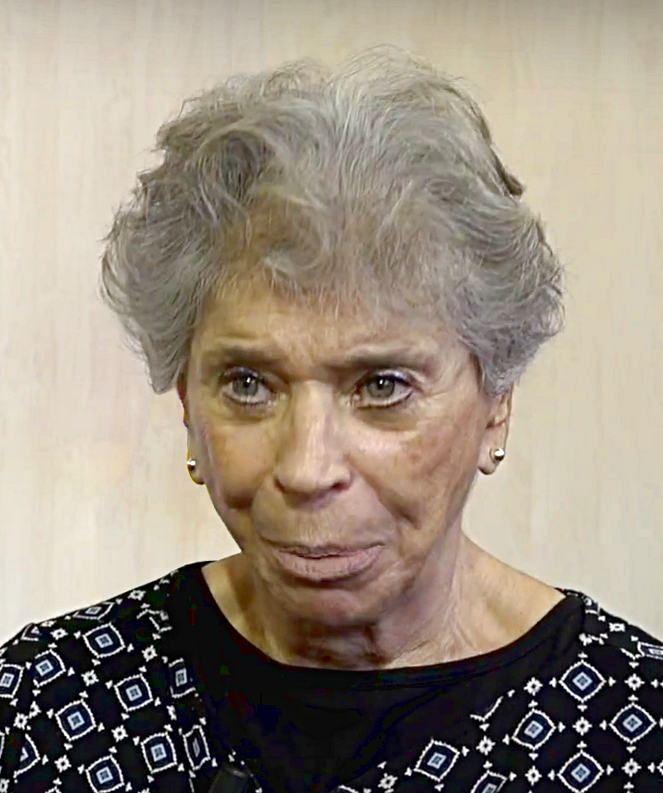
Toledano continued to attack communism in Modern Age by writing on books by communist-sympathizing Vivian Gornick (here, 2018)

- "A Sort of Traitors (Review): The New Meaning of Treason, by Rebecca West" (Spring 1965)
- "Verse" (Spring 1966)
- "The New Leviathan (Review): The Liberal Establishment, by M. Stanton Evans" (Winter 1966)
- "On Poetry: The Fallacy of Truth" (Winter 1975)
- "Towards a Higher Imperative (Review): Perjury: The Hiss-Chambers Case by Allen Weinstein" (Fall 1978)
- "In Search of Identity (Review): In Search of History, by Theodore H. White" (Summer 1979)
- "Fictional Romances (Review): The Romance of American Communism, by Vivian Gornick" (Winter 1979)
- " The Will to Lose (Review): Delusion and Reality, by Janos Radvanyi" (Winter 1980)
- "Honest Reporter (Review): Making It Perfectly Clear, by Herbert G. Klein" (Fall 1981)

Policy Review (1980–1992):

- "Tales from the Public Sector" with Catherine Utley (Spring 1980)
- "Over There: The Timerman Affair (Fall 1981)
- "The Cold War's Magnificent Seven (Whittaker Chambers – Witness)" (Winter 1992)

Chronicles (1992–2001):

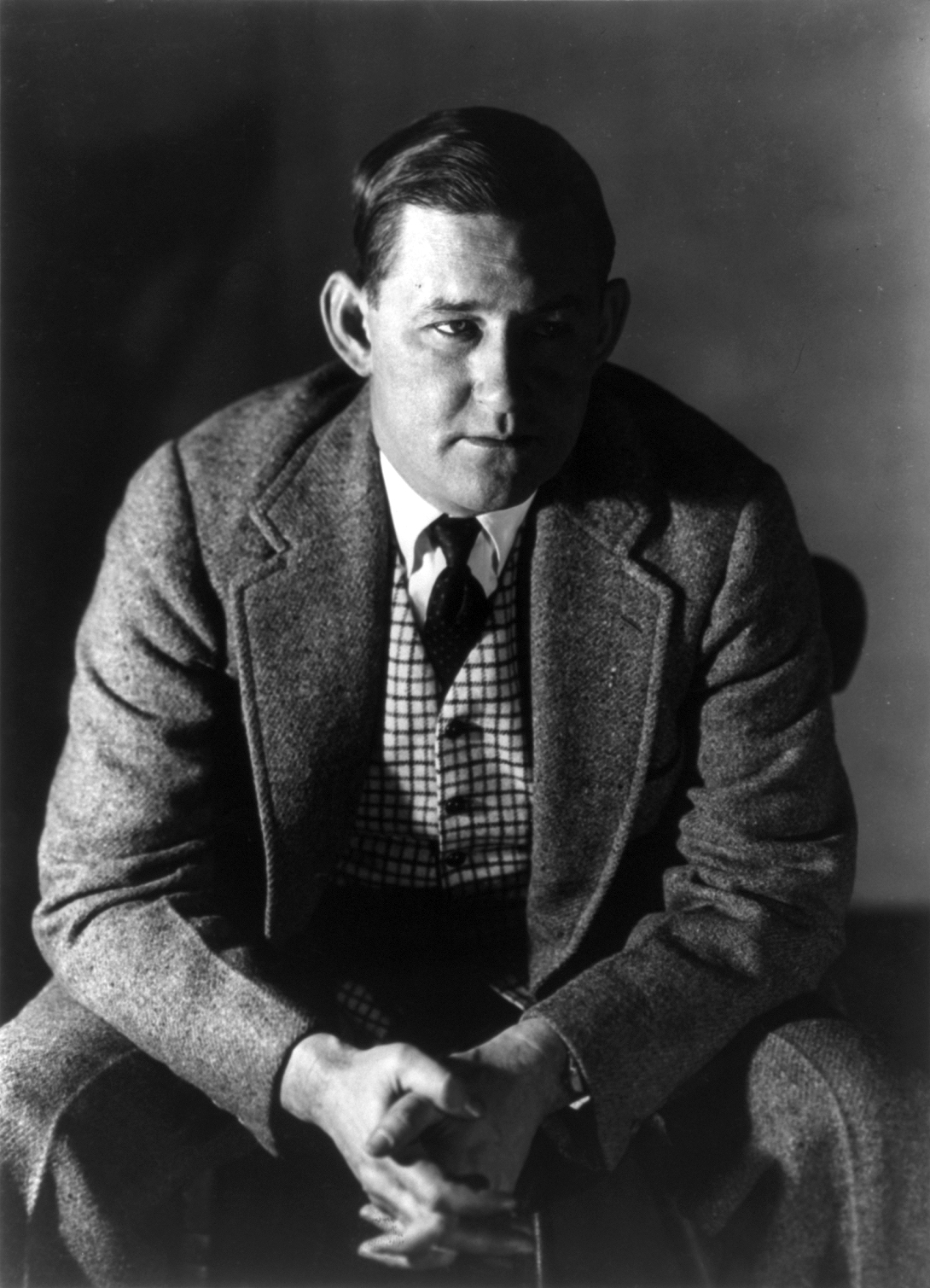
Toledano wrote on cultural and literary topics like writer John O'Hara (here, 1945) for Chronicles

- "My Aunt & Unamuno" (January 1992)
- "Professor Burnham, Mafioso Costello, and Me" (October 1994)
- "Letters: James Branch Cabell" (December 1994)
- "The Russo-German Symbiosis in the First and Second World Wars" (February 1995)
- "Vital Signs: Poetry: Erato in the Throes" (June 1995)
- "Literature: Conrad Aiken (July 1996)
- "Literature: John O'Hara and American Conservatism" (February 1997)
- "A Prophet's Reward (Review): Whittaker Chambers: A Biography, by Sam Tanenhaus" (September 1997)
- "A Pretense of Knowledge (Review): The Haunted Wood, by Allen Weinstein and Alexander Vassiliev" (June 1999)
- "Music: Berlioz: A Musical Apotheosis" (October 2001)

Commentary (1996):

- "Among the Ashkenazim" (June 1996)

American Conservative (2004–06):

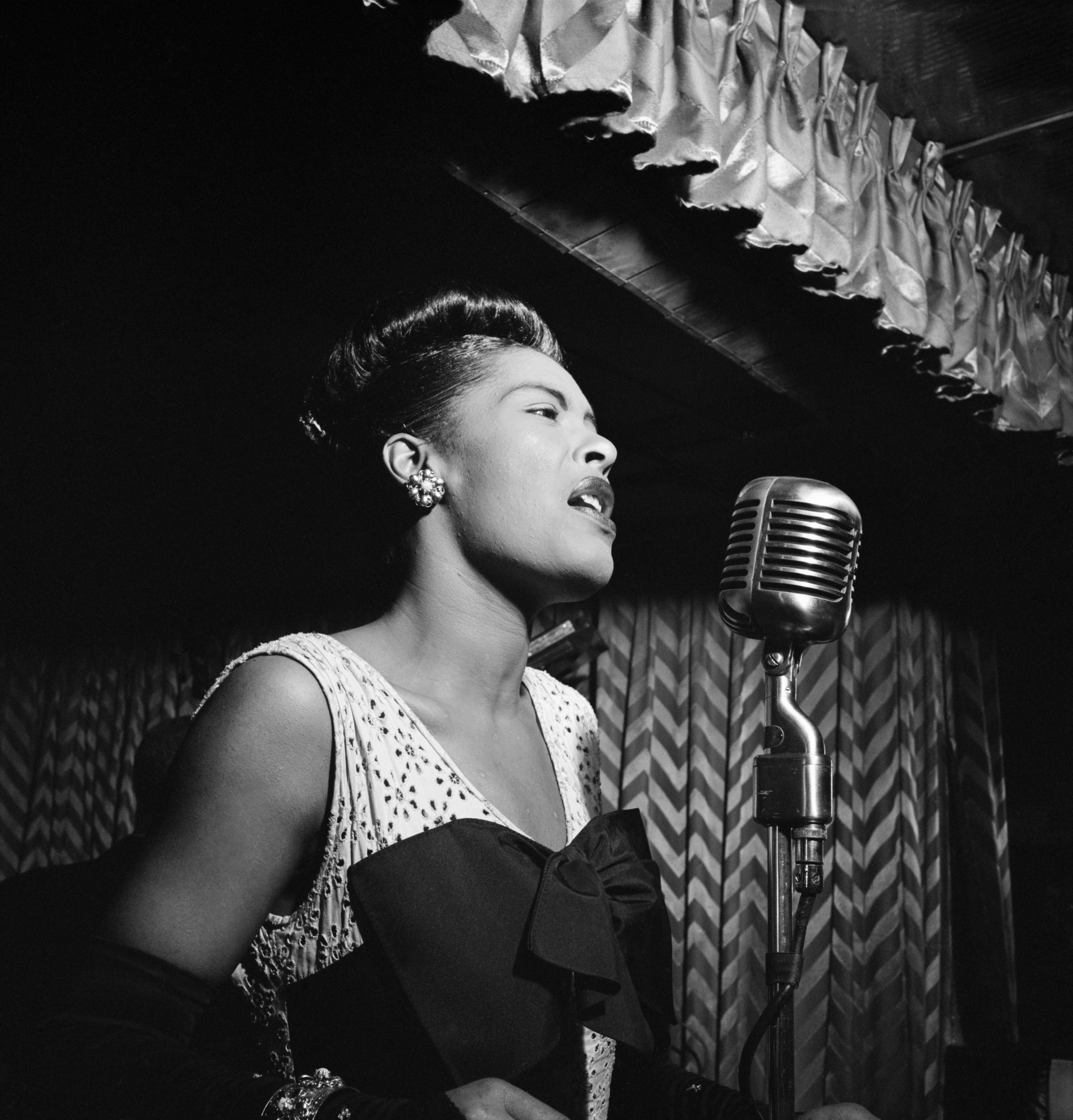
Toledano continued to write about music in the last decade of his life, including about Billie Holiday (here at the Downbeat Jazz Club in February 1947)

- "Writing Irishman (Review): An Honest Writer, by Robert K. Landers" (July 5, 2004)
- "Recounting the Miles (Review): Miles Gone By, by William F. Buckley, Jr." (October 11, 2004)
- "I Witness: My life with Whittaker Chambers" (February 14, 2005)
- "The Real McCarthy" (April 25, 2005)
- "Music: Jelly Roll & All That Jazz" (May 9, 2005)
- "Music: Homage to a Catalonian" (June 20, 2005)
- "Deep Throat's Ghosts" (July 4, 2005)
- "Music: Jazz Was Bechet's Crown" (October 24, 2005)
- "Music: Bix Was the Best" (March 13, 2006)
- "Music: Papa Haydn" (June 19, 2006)
- "Music: Remembering Casals" ((September 1996)
- "Music: Chanteuse of Strange Fruit" (October 9, 2006)
- "Music: Bach Reaches Out to God" (December 4, 2006)
