= Wendell Eugene =

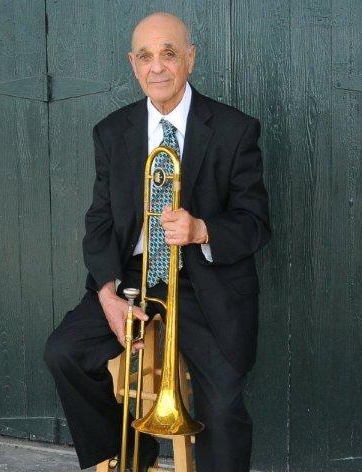

Background information
- Birth name: Wendell Albert Eugene
- Born: October 12, 1923; New Orleans, Louisiana, U.S.
- Died: November 7, 2017 (aged 94); New Orleans, Louisiana, U.S.
- Genres: Jazz
- Occupations: Jazz Musician
- Instrument: Trombone
- Formerly of: Olympia Brass Band, Tuxedo Brass Band, Onward Brass Band

Wendell Eugene (October 12, 1923 – November 7, 2017) was an American jazz musician from New Orleans, Louisiana. He was a popular trombonist on the New Orleans jazz scene and recorded with artists such as Lionel Ferbos, Harold Dejan, and Kermit Ruffins. He was for a time the oldest active jazz musician in New Orleans.

== Early life ==
Eugene was born to Homer and Apha Eugene on October 12, 1923, and is the youngest of five brothers. He grew up in a family of musicians including his brother Homer Eugene, his cousin Clement Tervalon, and uncle Albert Burbank. His curiosity about music began at the age of 10 when his parents bought him a graphanola. He said he would wind it up and play The Peanut Vendor and Ramona. He received his first trombone at the age of 13 from his brother Homer after mentioning that he wanted to start playing an instrument. As a kid he learned from other New Orleans musicians, but also listened and learned from Big Band Music as well as trombonist J. J. Johnson. While still in high school, he joined the musician's union at 15 and began playing with a variety of New Orleans Jazz Legends. As a teenager, Eugene performed with Avery "Kid" Howard as well as performers and band leaders such as Papa Celestin, George Lewis, Papa French, Paul Barbarin, Louis Cottrell Jr., Willie Humphrey, Don Albert, and Kid Thomas Valentine.

== Military career ==
Eugene joined the United States Navy during World War II and was recruited to play with the U.S. Navy Marching and Concert Band while stationed at Port Chicago, California. He played with the band throughout his four-year enlistment and also played with Louis Armstrong during a 1943 USO event. At the time, Armstrong was short a trombonist and asked Eugene to fill in. Eugene was quoted in The Times-Picayune as saying, "I got up there and did the best I could. I'll never forget it."

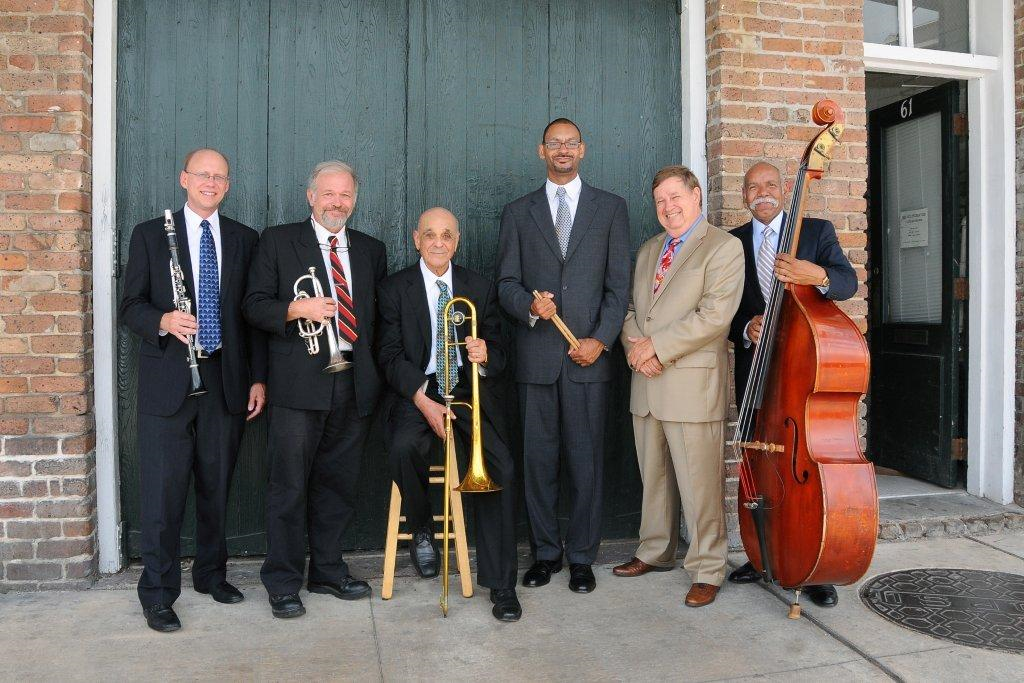
Wendell Eugene's New Orleans Jazz Band. From left to right: Tom Fischer, Jamie Wight, Wendell Eugene, Jason Marsalis, Lars Edegran, & Richard Moten

== Music career ==
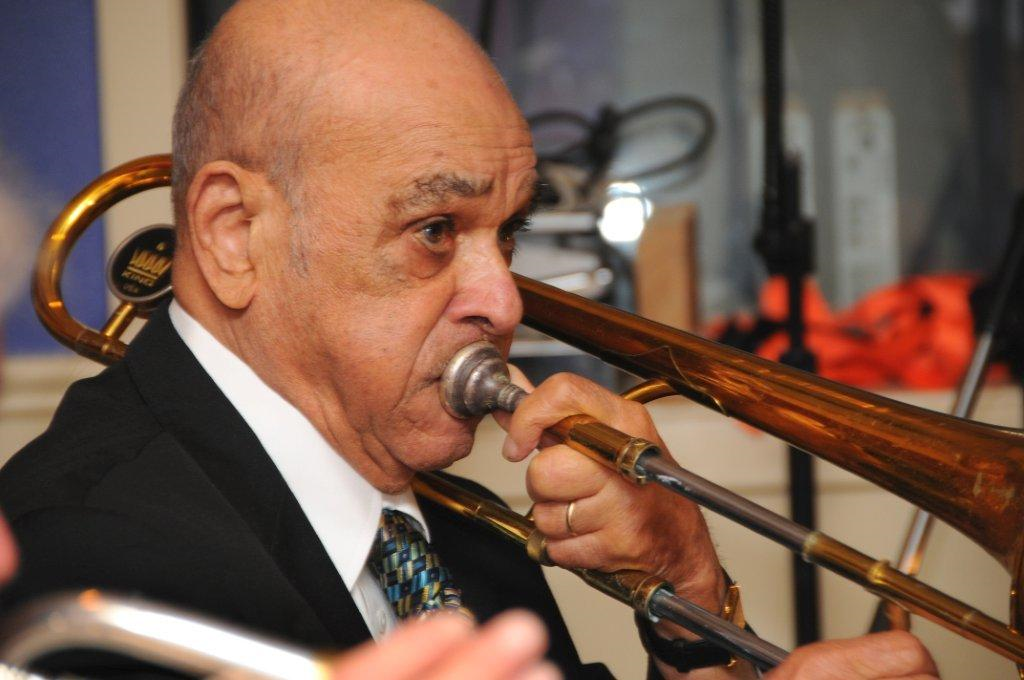
Wendell Eugene in studio in 2013, recording album If I Had My Life To Live Over

Eugene returned to New Orleans after his military career. He began playing with famous bands from New York City and Chicago and also toured with Lucky Millender and Buddy Johnson. Instead of leaving his family to tour, Eugene stayed close to home, working at the United States Post Office. During that time he continued playing with local band leaders such as Papa Celestin and Papa French. Eugene traveled and toured when he could, sometimes joining the Olympia Brass Band, the Tuxedo Brass Band, and the Onward Brass Band. Although limited in travel due to work obligations, Eugene was still able to sit with several renowned musical groups such as Lionel Hampton and The Temptations. He retired from the Post Office in 1979 and began to pursue his music career full-time.

Eugene is also a writer and composer. In 1978, he wrote, produced, and recorded the album West Indies Blues which was initially released by 504 Records and re-released by the Louisiana Music Factory in 2005. Eugene has played and taught music for more than 72 years, including teaching trombone and dance orchestra instruments at the Grunewald School of Music. Some of his most notable performances include playing at Super Bowl IV in New Orleans in 1970 with the Onward Brass Band. He also played at the first New Orleans Jazz & Heritage Festival in 1970. In 2012 he played with the Preservation Hall Jazz Band for their 50th anniversary performance at the New Orleans Jazz & Heritage Festival, He also played at 2012 New Orleans Jazz Festival with then 100-year-old Lionel Ferbos.

Wendell Eugene died on 7 November 2017.

== Personal life ==
Eugene had four daughters, one grandchild, and three great grandchildren. He was Catholic.

== Discography ==
Year	Title	Label	Notes
2013	If I Had My Life To Life Over	GHB Records	Special anniversary edition – 75 years as a New Orleans Jazz Legend
2008	Men's Working	GHB Records	Trombone and vocals on album from Seva Venet
2007	City of Dreams: A Collection of New Orleans Music	Rounder Records / Universal Music Group	Trombone
2002	Big Easy	Basin Street Records	Trombone on album with Kermit Ruffins
2002	Place of My Dreams	GHB Records	Trombone on album by Lionel Ferbos
2001	Mardi Gras in New Orleans	Rounder Records	Compilation CD of various jazz artists with recordings from 1985 through 1997
2000	Paul Barbarin's Onward Brass Band in Concert 1968	Jazz Crusade	Trombone
1998	Kickin' Some Brass	Shanachie Records	Trombone on compilation CD with various artists including The Dirty Dozen, ReBirth, Coolbone, New Birth, and Lester Bowie's Brass Fantasy
1998	Louisiana 2: Live from the Mountain Stage	Blue Plate	Trombone on compilation CD
1997	Best of Bourbon Street Blues	Mardi Gras Records	Trombone on CD by Magnificent Seventh's Brass Band featuring Big Al Carson
1995	New Orleans Jazz Preservation	Mardi Gras Records	Trombone with the Olympia Brass Band
1995	New Orleans Jazz, Vol. 3: Jazz Party	Mardi Gras Records	Trombone
1995	The Best of Bourbon Street Jazz	Mardi Gras Records	Trombone with Mardi Gras Brass Band
1994	Authentic New Orleans Jazz Funeral	Mardi Gras Records	Trombone with the Magnificent Seventh's Brass Band
1994	Best of New Orleans Bourbon Street Jazz: After Dark	Mardi Gras Records	Trombone with the Magnificent Seventh's Brass Band
1993	Barry Martyn's Down Home Boys	Sackville Records	Trombone and vocals on album by Barry Martyn
1993	Fess: The Professor Longhair Anthology	Rhino Entertainment	Trombone on album with Professor Longhair
1993	On Bourbon Street	Compendia Music Group	Trombone on album by Harold Dejan
1992	Fallen Heroes: A Jazz Funeral	Pro-Arte Records	Trombone on album by Harold Dejan
1991	New Orleans: Mardi Gras	Compendia Music Group / Pro-Arte Records	Trombone with the Olympia Brass Band
1990	Basin Street Blues	Compendia Music Group / Pro-Arte Records	Trombone and group member on album by Harold Dejan and Olympia Brass Band
1989	New Orleans Brass Bands: Down Yonder	Rounder Records	Trombone
1987	Mardi Gras in New Orleans (Mardi Gras)	Mardi Gras Records	Trombone
1978	West Indies Blues	504 Records	Writer, producer, primary artist, and trombonist
