= Mark Braud =

American jazz musician (born 1973)

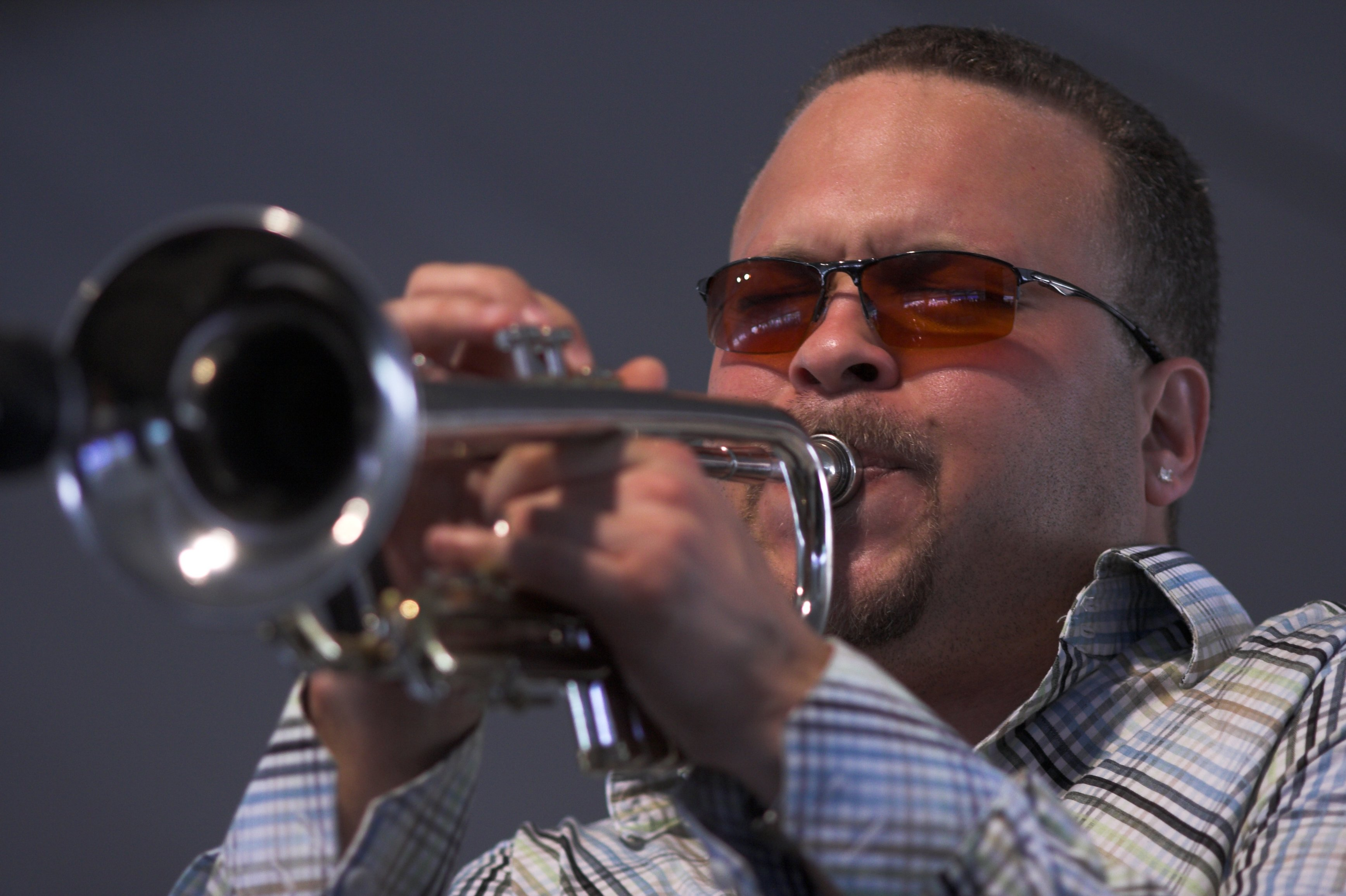
Braud performing in 2008

Mark Braud (born June 21, 1973) is an American jazz trumpeter and band leader, who is a current leader of the Preservation Hall Jazz Band's New Orleans band, and Mark Braud's Jazz Giants. He has been a sideman for dozens of groups including Harry Connick, Jr., Dr. Michael White's Original Liberty Jazz Band, Henry Butler, and R&B singer Eddie Bo.

== Biography ==
Braud began playing up the trumpet at the age of 12. He comes from a long line of New Orleans musicians. He is the grandson of legendary trumpeter John "Picket" Brunious, Sr., and the nephew of jazz trumpeters and Preservation Hall Jazz Band leaders Wendell Brunious and John Brunious, Jr.. Braud is also a distant relative of Duke Ellington Orchestra bassist Wellman Braud and the Santiago family. He began playing the trumpet at age of twelve. He was a student of the New Orleans Center for Creative Arts. He majored in jazz studies at the University of New Orleans. While studying there, he was chosen for the school's annual European tour.

== Career highlights ==
- 2010 Preservation Hall Jazz Band (Current Member).
- 2001 Harry Connick Jr. Big Band (Current Member).
- 2002 "One Mo' Time" - Broadway Musical

== As leader ==
- Preservation Hall Jazz Band - New Orleans Unit. Took over the job from his uncle, trumpeter Wendell Brunious.
- Mark Braud's Jazz Giants
- The Basin Street Brass Band

== As sideman ==
Braud has appeared with numerous artists as a sideman:

- Wynton Marsalis
- Eddie Bo
- Dr. Michael White
- Harry Connick Jr.
- Lars Edigren
