= Fred Lonzo =

American jazz trombonist

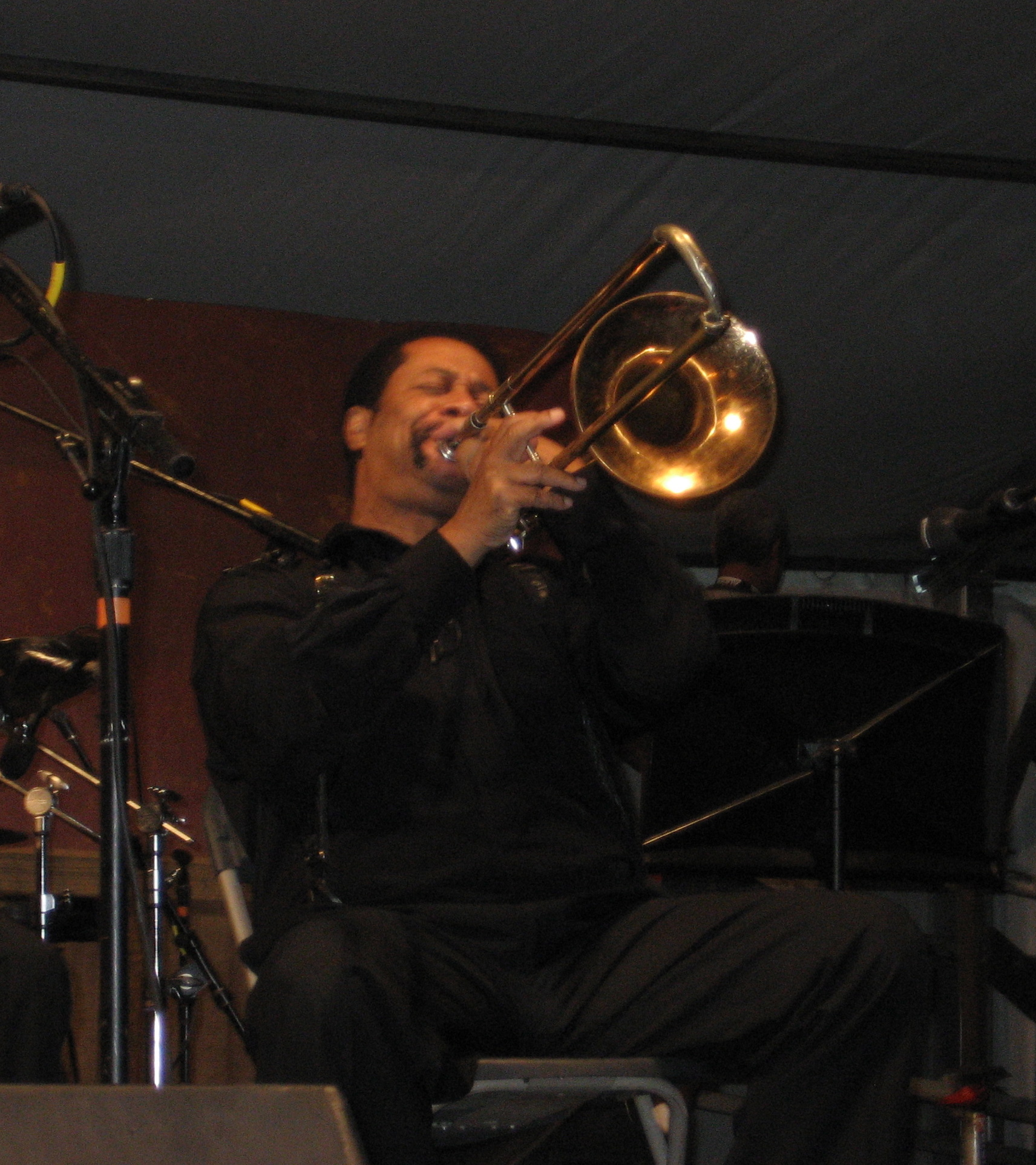
- New Orleans Jazz & Heritage Festival: Freddie Lonzo playing on Economy Hall stage

Background information
- Born: August 26, 1950 (age 75)
- Origin: New Orleans, Louisiana
- Genres: Jazz
- Instrument: Trombone

Fred Lonzo (born August 26, 1950), also known as Freddie Lonzo, is a jazz trombonist.

Born in New Orleans, Louisiana, Lonzo is one of the most highly regarded practitioners of "tailgate" style traditional jazz trombone. His style is distinctly his own, but such influences as Kid Ory and Frog Joseph can be heard.

Lonzo has played with such brass bands as Doc Paulin's, the Imperial, Olympia, and Young Tuxedo.

Lonzo has played and recorded with such notables as Alvin Alcorn, Doc Cheatham, Evan Christopher, Lars Edegran, Bob French, Wynton Marsalis, Teddy Riley, Dr. Michael White, Wendell Brunious and Sammy Rimington.

In New Orleans, he regularly plays at such venues as Donna's, the Palm Court Jazz Cafe, and Preservation Hall.
