= Preservation Hall Jazz Band =

American jazz band

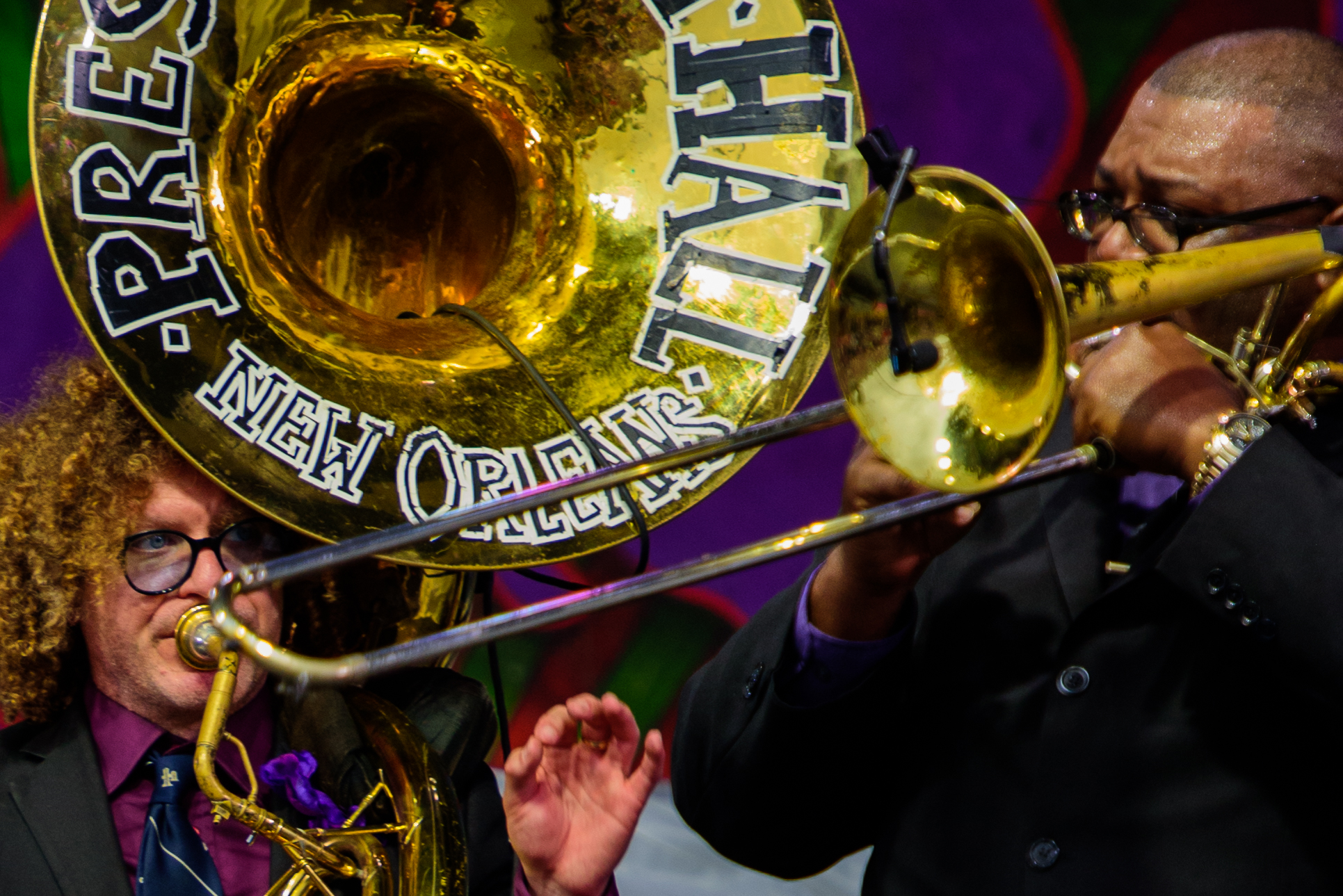
- 2 members of the Preservation Hall Jazz Band in March 2016

Background information
- Origin: New Orleans, Louisiana, U.S.
- Genres: New Orleans jazz
- Years active: 1963–present
- Labels: Sony Legacy, Preservation Hall Recordings
- Members: Charlie Gabriel; Walter Harris; Ben Jaffe; Branden Lewis; Clint Maedgen; Kyle Roussel
- Past members: see below
- Website: preservationhalljazzband.com

The Preservation Hall Jazz Band is a New Orleans jazz band founded in New Orleans by tuba player Allan Jaffe in the early 1960s. The band derives its name from Preservation Hall in the French Quarter. In 2005, the Hall's doors were closed for a period of time due to Hurricane Katrina, but the band continued to tour.

== Early years ==
In the 1950s, Larry Borenstein, an art dealer from Milwaukee, managed Preservation Hall in the French Quarter as an art gallery. To attract customers, he invited local New Orleans jazz musicians to play. After their honeymoon in 1961, Allan Jaffe and his wife Sandra visited to hear some traditional New Orleans jazz. The Jaffes were from Pennsylvania. Allan Jaffe was a tuba player who had graduated from the Wharton School of Business in Philadelphia, while his wife had been employed at an advertising agency. They attended concerts, grew to love the French Quarter, and stayed longer than they had intended. Borenstein asked if they wanted to manage Preservation Hall, and they agreed.

Allan Jaffe hired local musicians whose ages ranged from the 60s to the 90s. Many were struggling with poverty, racism, and illness. At first the Jaffes served no alcohol, used no amplification, and did not advertise. In 1963, Allan Jaffe began to tour with bands in the U.S. and in other countries. These tours included such popular figures as pianist Sweet Emma Barrett, trumpeter Kid Thomas Valentine, brothers Percy Humphrey and Willie Humphrey, trumpeter De De Pierce and his wife, pianist Billie Pierce. The most popular was clarinetist George Lewis, whose reputation preceded the Hall. Fans from all over the world came to New Orleans to hear traditional jazz. French clarinetist Michel Sebastiani later became an Olympic fencing coach for the U.S. national team.

== Olympia Brass Band ==
Barrett's health began to decline in the 1970s, which forced her to stop touring. She was replaced as leader by brothers Percy Humphrey (trumpet) and Willie Humphrey (clarinet). The lineup included Frank Demond (trombone), James Prevost (bass), James "Sing" Miller (piano), Cie Frazier (drums), Jim Robinson (trombone), Narvin Kimball (banjo), and Allan Jaffe (tuba).

During the late 1960s and early 1970s, many of the touring members were hired by Harold Dejan for his Olympia Brass Band. This band became not only a staple at Preservation Hall, but also influenced the Preservation Hall Jazz Band and future Preservation Hall musicians.

Dejan's regular sidemen included Andy Anderson (trumpet), Milton Batiste (trumpet), Kid Sheik Cola (trumpet), Paul Crawford (trombone) Gerald Joseph (trombone), Emanuel Paul (tenor saxophone), Andrew Jefferson (snare), John Smith, Henry "Booker T" Glass, Nowell "Papa" Glass. Cag Cagnolatti, Kid Thomas Valentine, Louis Nelson, Louis Cottrell, Jr., Cié Frazier, Emanuel Sayles, and Allan Jaffe on tuba were among those who played with the group. During the Olympia years, a young Harry Connick Jr. performed with Barrett and the band at Preservation Hall.

In 1977, Jaffe and Arthur Hall and his Afro-American Dance Ensemble released Fat Tuesday and All That Jazz! A Mardi Gras Dance Musical. The world premiere of the dance musical was on February 19, 1977, and was followed by a tour in the United States. Dejan's Olympia Brass Band was featured in Fat Tuesday and All That Jazz, in addition to the Arthur Hall Afro-American Dance Ensemble of Philadelphia, Pennsylvania.

== Later years ==
In 1987, Allan Jaffe died of cancer at the age of fifty-one. After his son Ben graduated from Oberlin College, he became artistic director in 1993. Ben Jaffe toured with the Preservation Hall Jazz Band, playing double bass and tuba. He began the educational initiatives that his father developed.

"As many as 20 different bands, drawn from a pool of about 150 local musicians, had played at Preservation Hall in the 1960s, but by 1999 virtually all of the older generation of musicians had died and the band members were a mixture of younger African-American players and white musicians from overseas. Most notable among the former were Michael White (ii), Wendell Brunious (who gradually took over the leadership of Valentine's band in the elder trumpeter's final years, as well as the touring band), Freddie Lonzo, and the tuba player Walter Payton; Europeans included the Swedish pianist Lars Edegran, the English trumpeter Clive Wilson, Orange Kellin, and Jacques Gauthé" (Hazeldine, Kernfeld).

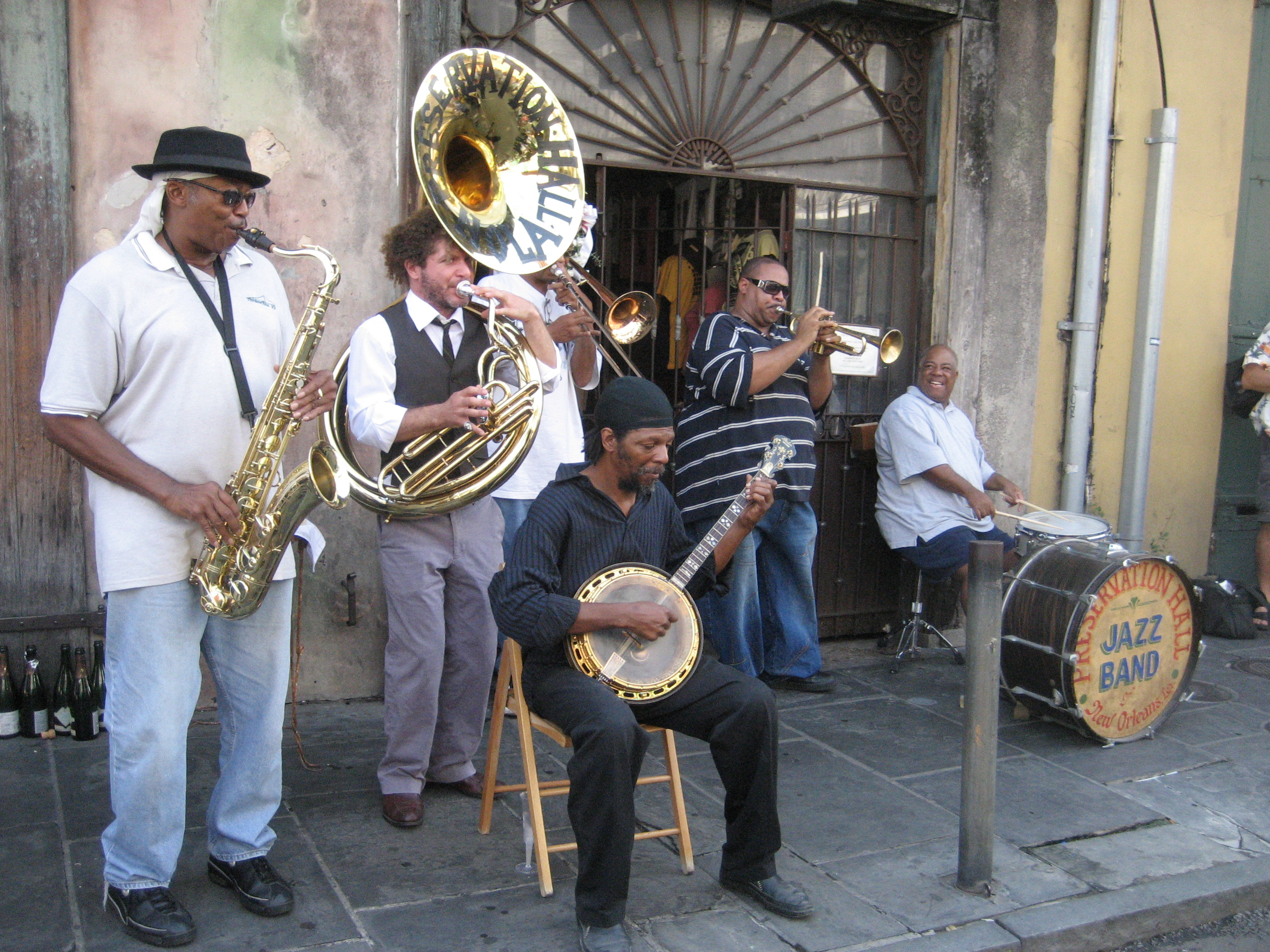
Members of the Preservation Hall Jazz Band playing in front of Preservation Hall, October 2007.

The Preservation Hall Jazz Band continued to tour nationally and internationally. The band was led by trumpeter Wendell Brunious, later replaced by his older brother, John Brunious.

In 2006, the Preservation Hall Jazz Band was awarded the National Medal of Arts, the nation's highest honor for artistic excellence. The award was presented to Benjamin Jaffe and co-founder of Preservation Hall, Sandra Jaffe, who accepted the award from President and Mrs. Laura Bush in an Oval Office ceremony on November 9, 2006. The citations read: "With enormous talent and pride, this ageless ensemble has toured the world displaying the unbreakable spirit of New Orleans and sharing the joy of New Orleans jazz with us all."

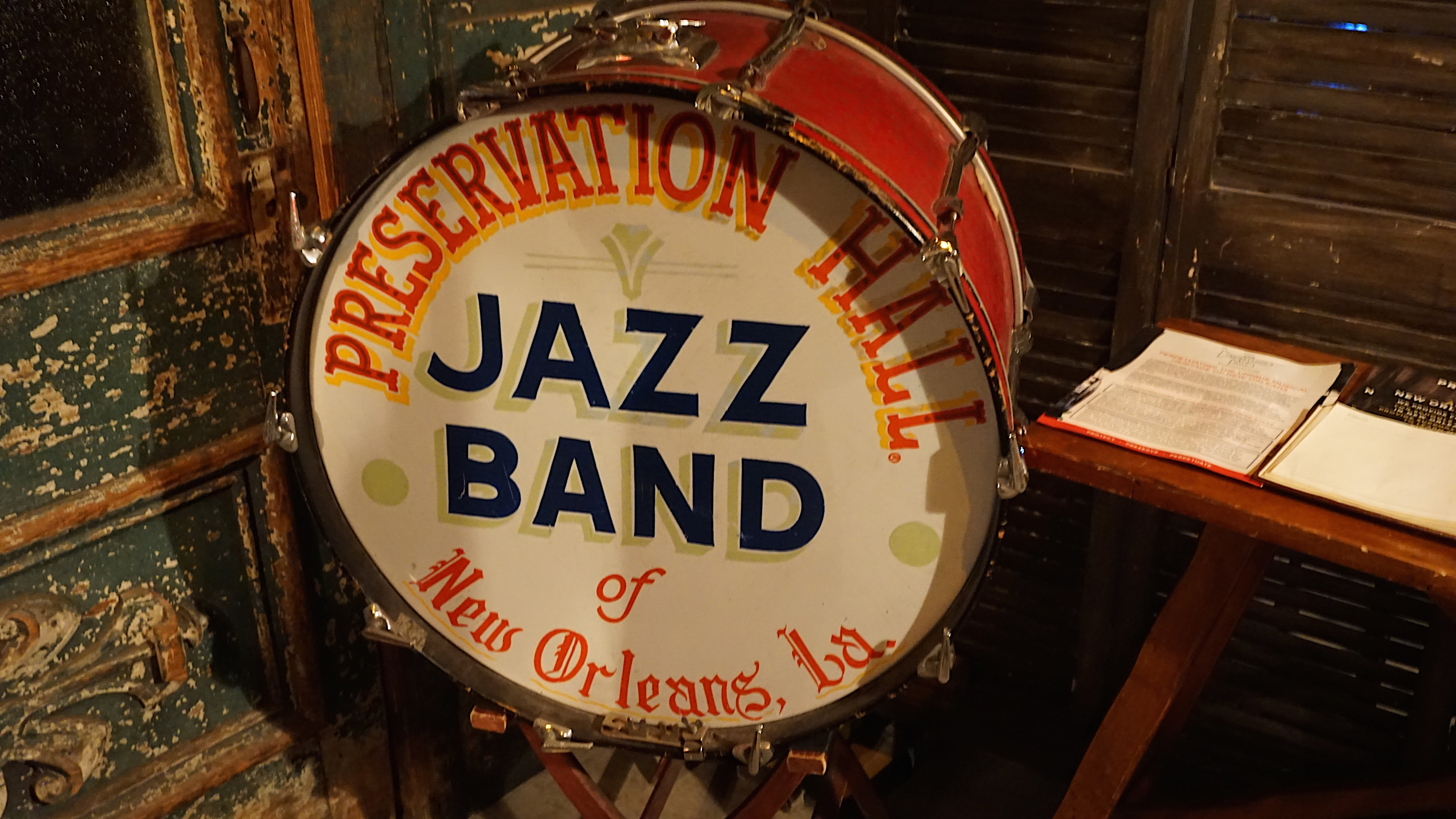
New Orleans, December 2017

Nearing Preservation Hall's 45th anniversary, the band collaborated with musicians from other genres, such as Blind Boys of Alabama on their Grammy Award winning album Down in New Orleans. The band's benefit album in 2010 contained contributions from Andrew Bird, Del McCoury Band, Jim James, Dr. John, Pete Seeger, and Tom Waits. The Hall band supported My Morning Jacket on tour. The album American Legacies was a collaboration with the Del McCoury band, uniting New Orleans jazz and bluegrass music.

In 2014, the Preservation Hall Jazz Band made a guest appearance on the Foo Fighters' eighth studio album Sonic Highways.

The Trey McIntyre Project dance ensemble collaborated with the Preservation Hall Jazz Band to create Ma Maison and The Sweeter End, two contemporary dance works set. The two ensembles toured numerous dates nationally, including performances at the Hollywood Bowl and the Lincoln Center.

In 2018 the documentary A Tuba to Cuba was released.

In 2025, Preservation Hall Jazz Band and Preservation Brass' album For Fat Man was nominated for the Grammy Award for Best Regional Roots Music Album.

== 50th anniversary ==
Preservation Hall celebrated its Golden Anniversary from 2011 to 2012. Projects included:

- 50th Anniversary Concert at Carnegie Hall with Allen Toussaint, Frank Demond, Yasiin Bey, Givers, Steve Earle
- Art and Jazz: Preservation Hall at 50 at the Ogden Museum of Southern Art.
- Opened the Preservation Hall at 50 exhibition at the Old US Mint in New Orleans.
- Performed at New Orleans Jazz & Heritage Festival, with Bonnie Raitt, Jim James, Allen Toussaint, Steve Earle, Rebirth Brass Band.
- The Hall band became the first to perform at both the Newport Jazz Festival and the Newport Folk Festival in the same year.
- Two albums were released: Preservation Hall Jazz Band 50th Anniversary Collection (Sony Legacy) and St. Peter & 57th St. (Rounder) a recording of the 50th Anniversary concert at Carnegie Hall

== Awards ==
=== National Medal of Arts ===
In 2006, President George W. Bush and the National Endowment for the Arts awarded the Preservation Hall Jazz Band with the National Medal of Arts, the highest honor given to artists and arts patrons by the United States government. A writer for the NEA commented, "Whether performing at Carnegie Hall or Lincoln Center, for British Royalty or the King of Thailand, the band conveys a joyful, timeless spirit. Under the auspices of current director, Ben Jaffe, the son of founders Allan and Sandra, Preservation Hall continues with a deep reverence and consciousness of its impressive history as a venue, band, and record label."

=== NAACP Image Awards ===
Year	Category	Work nominated	Result	Ref.
2013	Jazz Album	The Preservation Hall 50th Anniversary Collection	Won	
2018	Outstanding Jazz Album	So It Is	Nominated	

=== OffBeat's Best of the Beat Awards ===
Year	Category	Result	Ref.
2000	Best Traditional Jazz Band or Performer	Won	
2007	Best Traditional Jazz Band or Performer	Won	
2008	Best Traditional Jazz Band or Performer	Won	
2011	Best Traditional Jazz Band or Performer	Won	
2012	Best Traditional Jazz Album (for St. Peter & 57th St.)	Won	
2015	Best Music Video (for "That's It!" with Lyrics Born and director Jermaine Quiz)	Won	
2016	Best Traditional Jazz Band or Performer	Won	
2017	Best Traditional Jazz Band or Performer	Won	
2017	Best Traditional Jazz Album (for So It Is)	Won	
2018	Best Traditional Jazz Band or Performer	Won	
2019	Best Traditional Jazz Band or Performer	Won	
2020	Best Traditional Jazz Band or Performer	Won	
2021–22	Best Traditional Jazz Band or Performer	Won	
2023	Best Traditional Jazz Artist	Won	

== Members ==
- Ben Jaffe – double bass, tuba
- Charlie Gabriel – saxophone, clarinet
- Walter Harris – drums
- Branden Lewis – trumpet
- Clint Maedgen – vocals, saxophone
- Kyle Roussel – piano

Past members

- Lucien Barbarin – trombone
- Paul Barbarin – drums
- Sweet Emma Barrett – piano
- John Brunious – trumpet
- Wendell Brunious – trumpet
- Albert Burbank – clarinet
- Raymond Burke – clarinet
- Maynard Chatters – trombone
- Paul Crawford – trombone, baritone horn
- Manny Crusto – clarinet
- Frank Demond – trombone
- Lars Edegran – piano
- Frank Fields – bass
- Cie Frazier – drummer
- Percy Humphrey – trumpet
- Willie Humphrey – clarinet
- Allan Jaffe – tuba
- Ralph H. Johnson – clarinet
- Ronell Johnson – trombone (died June 2026)
- Leroy Jones – trumpet
- Jeanette Kimball – piano
- Narvin Kimball – banjo player
- Carl LeBlanc – banjo
- George Lewis – clarinet
- Jeffery Miller – trombone
- Punch Miller – trumpet
- Sing Miller – piano
- Louis Nelson – trombone
- Alcide Pavageau – bass
- Walter Payton – double bass
- Billie Pierce – piano
- De De Pierce – trumpet, cornet
- Shannon Powell – drums
- James Prevost – bass
- Joe Robichaux – piano
- Jim Robinson – trombone
- Lester Santiago – piano
- Emanuel Sayles – banjoist
- Kid Sheik – trumpet
- Gregg Stafford – trumpet
- Kid Thomas Valentine – trumpet
- Don Vappie – banjo
- Mari Watanabe – piano
- Michael White – clarinet
- Ricky Monie – Piano
- Joseph Lastie – Drums

== Discography ==
- New Orleans' Sweet Emma and Her Preservation Hall Jazz Band (Preservation Hall, 1964)
- New Orleans' Billie & De De and Their Preservation Hall Jazz Band (Preservation Hall, 1966)
- New Orleans Volume 1 (Columbia, 1977)
- New Orleans Vol. II (CBS, 1982)
- When the Saints Go Marchin' In (CBS, 1983)
- New Orleans Vol. IV (CBS, 1988)
- Preservation Hall Jazz Band Live! (Sony, 1992)
- In the Sweet Bye & Bye (Sony, 1996)
- Because of You (Sony, 1998)
- Songs of New Orleans (Preservation Hall, 1999)
- Shake That Thing (Preservation Hall, 2004)
- New Orleans Preservation Vol. 1 (Preservation Hall, 2009)
- An Album to Benefit Preservation Hall and the Preservation Hall Music Outreach Program (Preservation Hall, 2010)
- American Legacies (Preservation Hall, 2011)
- St. Peter & 57th St. (Rounder, 2012)
- Jazzfest Live 2012 (MunckMix, 2012)
- That's It! (Legacy, 2013)
- Run Stop & Drop!! (Legacy, 2017)
- So It Is (Legacy, 2017)
- A Tuba to Cuba (Sub Pop, 2019)
- For Fat Man (Sub Pop, 2025)

== Sources ==
- William Carter. Preservation Hall: Music from the Heart, 1991. ISBN 0-393-02915-8
- "Preservation Hall Jazz Band reunites in NYC", MSNBC, September 21, 2005. Retrieved July 24, 2008]
- Hazeldine, Mike; Kernfeld, Barry. "Olympia Brass Band". Oxford Music Online.
- Hazeldine, Mike; Kernfeld, Barry. "Preservation Hall Jazz Band". Oxford Music Online.
