= 504 Records =

American record label

- Founded: 1978
- Founder: Mike Dine
- Genre: Dixieland, jazz
- Country of origin: U.S.
- Location: New Orleans, Louisiana
- Official website: www.strochavrecordings.com

504 Records is a record label founded by Mike Dine in 1979 that specializes in New Orleans jazz. The name comes from an area code in New Orleans.

== History ==
Mike Dine was a British draughtsman and jazz fan living in England when he met Tom Stagg, now a British expatriate, jazz fan, and founder of NOLA Records. During the 1960s, Stagg had helped bring to Europe musicians such as John Handy, Andrew Morgan, Louis Nelson, Alton Purnell, Emanuel Sayles, and Kid Thomas. When Dine started 504 Records in 1979, he hired Stagg as a producer, and Stagg shut down NOLA Records.

Between 2005 and 2018, 504 Records collaborated with La Croix Records (UK) to co-produce 9 504/La Croix CDs in the Lord Richard New Orleans Sessions series. This series included tapes owned exclusively by Lord Richard Ekins, La Croix Records, supplemented with material owned by Mike Dine, 504 Records. 504 Records is now owned by Upbeat Recordings, UK, with the exclusive ownership of all 504/La Croix material passing to Lord Richard Ekins.

Dine released The 504 Records Story: 1978–2003 (25 Year Anniversary Release). He died in Welling, Kent, England, on December 17, 2016.

== Artists ==
- John Brunious
- Raymond Burke
- Chuck Carbo
- Ken Colyer
- Lionel Ferbos
- Pete Fountain
- George Lewis
- Freddie Lonzo
- Teddy Riley
- Kid Sheik
- Michael White
- Young Tuxedo Brass Band
- Chester Zardis

== See also ==
- List of record labels
