= Sandra Jaffe =

American club owner (1938–2021)

- Jaffe, from a 1962 newspaper
- Born: Sandra Smolen; March 10, 1938; Philadelphia, Pennsylvania, U.S.
- Died: December 27, 2021 (aged 83); New Orleans, Louisiana, U.S.
- Known for: Co-founded Preservation Hall
- Spouse: Allan Jaffe
- Children: Ben Jaffe

Sandra Smolen Jaffe (March 10, 1938 – December 27, 2021) was an American businesswoman and arts figure. She co-owned and operated Preservation Hall, a popular jazz club in New Orleans, beginning in 1961.

== Early life and education ==
Jaffe was born in Philadelphia, Pennsylvania, the daughter of Jacob "Jack" Smolen and Lena Kaplan Smolen. Her family was Jewish; her father was born in Kyiv, then part of the Russian Empire. She graduated from Harcum College in 1958.

== Career ==
Jaffe worked in advertising in Philadelphia for a few years before she married. She owned and operated Preservation Hall with her husband Allan Jaffe, beginning in 1961. She booked the "real, old-time New Orleans jazz performers" including Billie Pierce, De De Pierce, Sweet Emma Barrett, Alcide Pavageau, and Percy Humphrey. She also handled the bookkeeping, publicity, and press correspondence, and collected admission at the entrance. The Jaffes' policy of racial integration in the early 1960s meant that she was arrested at least once for violating local segregation laws. In 1963 she traveled with the Preservation Hall Jazz Band to Hawaii and Japan.

In 1987, the Jaffes donated a building in the French Quarter to the New Orleans Jazz and Heritage Foundation, for a music school. In 1993, she retired from running the jazz club, and left it to her son Ben Jaffe's management. In 2006 Jaffe accepted a National Medal of Arts award on behalf of the Preservation Hall Jazz Band.

== Personal life ==
She married Allan Jaffe in December 1960. They had two sons, Russell and Ben. Ben Jaffe is the band leader of the Preservation Hall Jazz Band. Her husband died in 1987, and she died in 2021, at the age of 83, in New Orleans. In February 2023, there was a tribute concert to the Jaffes at Preservation Hall.
