= A Tuba to Cuba =

- Theatrical release poster
- Directed by: T. G. Herrington; Danny Clinch
- Written by: T. G. Herrington
- Produced by: Nicelle Herrington; Han Soto; T. G. Herrington
- Starring: Ben Jaffe; Walter Harris; Charlie Gabriel; Ronell Johnson; Clint Maedgen
- Production companies: Nom de Guerre Films; Preservation Hall Films; Setlife Films
- Distributed by: Blue Fox Entertainment
- Release date: March 14, 2018 (SXSW)
- Running time: 82 minutes
- Country: United States
- Language: English
- Box office: $124,592

A Tuba to Cuba is a 2018 American documentary film directed by T. G. Herrington and Danny Clinch. The film follows Ben Jaffe and the Preservation Hall Jazz Band as they travel from New Orleans to Cuba to examine musical connections between Dixieland jazz and Cuban music.

The documentary had its world premiere in the 24 Beats Per Second section at the 2018 South by Southwest Film Festival. It was released in theaters in the United States by Blue Fox Entertainment on February 15, 2019.

== Synopsis ==
A Tuba to Cuba centers on Jaffe, the son of Preservation Hall founders Allan and Sandra Jaffe, as he seeks to fulfill his father's wish to trace the band's musical roots to Cuba. The film follows members of the Preservation Hall Jazz Band during a two-week trip to Cuba, including stops in Havana, Santiago de Cuba and Cienfuegos.

The documentary combines travel footage, performances and interviews with members of the band and Cuban musicians. It presents New Orleans and Cuba as linked through geography, history, rhythm and musical exchange across the Gulf of Mexico.

== Production ==
The film was directed by T. G. Herrington and Danny Clinch and written by Herrington. It was produced by Nicelle Herrington, Han Soto and Herrington, with production companies Nom de Guerre Films, Preservation Hall Films and Setlife Films.

The film was shot in New Orleans and in Cuba, including Havana, Santiago de Cuba and Cienfuegos. The film includes appearances by Jaffe, Walter Harris, Charlie Gabriel, Ronell Johnson and Clint Maedgen, along with other members of the Preservation Hall Jazz Band.

== Release ==
A Tuba to Cuba premiered at SXSW on March 14, 2018. SXSW listed the film as a documentary feature in its 24 Beats Per Second section and identified it as a world premiere.

Blue Fox Entertainment released the film in the United States on February 15, 2019. Box Office Mojo lists its theatrical run from February 15 to July 11, 2019, with a widest release of 16 theaters and a worldwide gross of $124,592.

== Reception ==
On Rotten Tomatoes, A Tuba to Cuba has a 100% approval rating based on 11 critic reviews. Metacritic listed three critic reviews as positive, with no mixed or negative reviews, but did not assign a Metascore because the film had fewer than four critic reviews.

Jeannette Catsoulis of The New York Times called the film a "joyous, wide-ranging account" of the Preservation Hall Jazz Band's 2015 visit to Cuba. Gary Goldstein of the Los Angeles Times described it as an exploration of the band's roots and wrote that the film gave viewers "a you-are-there pleasure." Michael King of The Austin Chronicle wrote that the film connected New Orleans and Cuban music through "Gulf geography and radio transmissions" and said it was likely to become a classic of the music documentary genre.

== Accolades ==
Award	Year	Category	Result	Ref.
New Orleans Film Festival	2018	Audience Award, Louisiana Feature — Documentary	Won	
Fairhope Film Festival	2018	Jury Award, Best Film	Won	
Tallgrass Film Festival	2018	Outstanding Cinematography	Won	
SXSW	2018	24 Beats Per Second	Official selection	
