= Gregg Stafford =

American jazz cornetist and trumpeter (born 1953)

- Stafford at Richmond Folk Festival in 2026

Background information
- Born: Gregory Vaughan Stafford; July 6, 1953 (age 73); New Orleans, Louisiana, U.S.
- Genres: Jazz, Dixieland
- Occupations: musician, composer, educator, band leader
- Instrument: Trumpet

Gregory Vaughan "Gregg" Stafford (born July 6, 1953, New Orleans) is an American jazz cornetist and trumpeter. He has been a jazz music educator in New Orleans since the 1980s and has led the Young Tuxedo Brass Band for more than thirty years.

Stafford was a member of an incarnation of the Fairview Baptist Church Marching Band, established by banjoist Danny Barker in 1971. He was awarded a bachelor's degree at Southern University in 1976 and played locally from the mid-1970s. Gregg teamed with Dr. Michael White playing in each other's bands to preserve the musical heritage of New Orleans. Dr. White formed his Original Liberty Jazz Band in 1981. Gregg became a music educator in New Orleans public schools in 1985, and took over leadership of the Young Tuxedo Brass Band in 1984. He also became the leader of the Heritage Hall Jazz Band in 1992 after Kid Sheik Cola's death; this group performed regularly at Preservation Hall in the 1990s. In 1994, he took over leadership of Danny Barker's Jazz Hounds, in which he had played from the early 1980s. Stafford has played with Wynton Marsalis, Brian Carrick, and Michael White. He co-founded the group Black Men of Labor, a second-line organization fostering brass bands in New Orleans.

== Discography ==
- That Man from New Orleans Vol. 1 & 2 (with Big Bill Bissonnette, Paul Boehmke, Roberta Hunt, Emil Mark, Colin Bray, Dennis Elder; 1998)
- Gregg Stafford Meets Brian Carrick (with Emil Mark, Colin Bray, Sven Stahlberg; 1999)
- New Orleans Delight Featuring Gregg Stafford & Brian Towers (with Kjeld Brandt, Hans Pedersen, Erling Lindhardt, Stefan Karfve, Claus Lindhardt; 2004)
