= Olympia Brass Band =

American jazz brass band

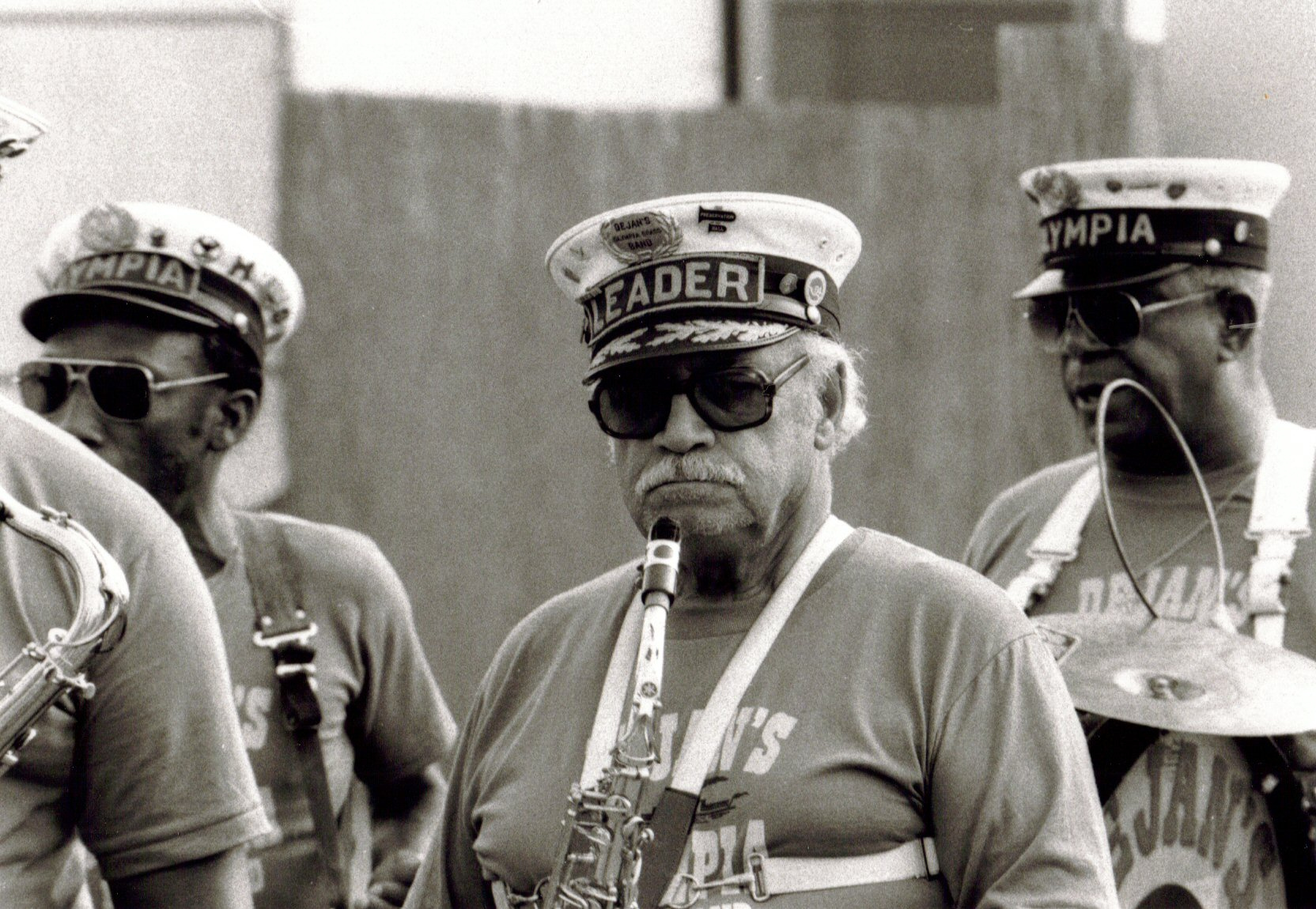
- Olympia Brass Band in Hollabrunn (1986), in the center Harold Dejan

Background information
- Origin: New Orleans
- Past members: Harold Dejan

The Olympia Brass Band is an American jazz brass band from New Orleans.

== History ==
The first Olympia Brass Band, then called 'The Olympia', was active from the late 19th century to c 1914. Its most famous members from that time are Freddie Keppard, Kid Ory, Armand J. Piron, Sydney Bechet, Clarence Williams and Johnny St. Cyr.

In 1958, saxophonist Harold Dejan, leader of the 2nd unit of the Eureka Brass Band, split off to form the Olympia Brass Band.

The band had a notable part in the 1973 James Bond movie Live and Let Die in which they play a band leading a funeral march and one of Bond's associates is assassinated during the march. Trumpeter Alvin Alcorn plays the knife-wielding "baby-faced killer".

In addition to playing for parades and parties, the band had a weekly gig at Preservation Hall on Sunday nights for many years. The band also toured Europe on numerous occasions and also toured Africa for the U. S. State Department. The band did a BBC Radio broadcast for Queen Elizabeth's 25th wedding anniversary in 1972 while they were in London, and also played for Pope John Paul II on his visit to New Orleans.

The Olympia Brass Band was a training ground for a whole new generation of jazz musicians including clarinetist Joseph Torregano, saxophonist Byron "Flea" Bernard, drummers Tanio Hingle and Kerry Hunter, and trumpeters Kenneth Terry and "Kid" Mervin Campbell.

Notable members of the band over the years were: Harold "Duke" Dejan, leader and alto saxophone; Emanuel "Pappy" Paul & Ernest Watson tenor saxophone; clarinetists Willie Humphrey, Joseph Torregano and David Grillier; trumpeters Milton Batiste (assistant leader), Edmond Foucher, George "Kid Sheik" Colar, Reginald Koeller, Kenneth Terry, and Mervin Campbell; trombonists Paul Crawford, Frank Naundorf, Wendell Eugene, Eddie King, Gerald Joseph, and Lester Caliste; sousaphonists Allan Jaffe, William "Coby" Brown, Anthony Lacen aka "Tuba Fats," Edgar Smith, and Jeffrey Hills; snare drummers Andrew Jefferson, Leroy "Boogie" Breaux, Kerry "Fatman" Hunter; bass drummers Henry "Booker T." Glass, Nowell "Papa" Glass, and Cayetano "Tanio" Hingle. Grand marshals for the band were Matthew "Fats" Houston (1911–81), Anderson Minor, Anderson Stewart, and Richard "King" Matthews, whose death in 2010 is considered to have ended the band's history.

Although the band left numerous recordings, none is more prevalent than their recording of "The Westlawn Funeral Dirge" which featured Emanuel Paul on the tenor saxophone.

The Olympia Brass Band is profiled in the book, The Great Olympia Band by the late English writer Mick Burns, and Keeping the Beat on the Street: The New Orleans Brass Band Renaissance also by Mick Burns.

== Discography ==
- New Orleans Street Parade (1968)
- Dejan's Olympia Brass Band of New Orleans, VPS-4, 1974, Preservation Hall, Publishers.
