= Herman Sherman =

American jazz musician

Herman Edward Sherman, Sr. (June 28, 1923 – September 10, 1984), was an American jazz saxophonist and bandleader.

Sherman was born in New Orleans. He played clarinet in high school and later picked up alto and tenor sax. He began working with brass bands on the New Orleans jazz scene around 1940, playing in the Eureka Brass Band, the Onward Brass Band, and the Young Tuxedo Brass Band. He took over the leadership of the Young Tuxedo Brass Band in 1971 until his death in 1984, and during his tenure the group toured the United States repeatedly and appeared in Berlin in 1980. He led the ensemble in the studio for their 1983 release Jazz Continues on 504 Records. Sherman occasionally played in dance bands, but concentrated on his work in brass bands.

He died in his home city of New Orleans on September 10, 1984 in his sleep.
