= So It Is =

Studio album by Preservation Hall Jazz Band
- Released: 21-Apr-2017
- Studio: Sonic Ranch
- Genre: Jazz
- Length: 34:13
- Label: Legacy
- Producer: Dave Sitek

Preservation Hall Jazz Band chronology
That's It!	So It Is

So It Is is a studio album by the Preservation Hall Jazz Band of New Orleans, Louisiana. It was released on April 21, 2017 on Legacy Recordings, produced by TV On the Radio's Dave Sitek and Ben Jaffe, and recorded at Sonic Ranch in Tornillo, TX. Dave had the band record in the round so they could feed off of each other's energy.

In addition to the traditional sounds and musical stylings of New Orleans jazz, the album has a strong Afro-Cuban influence as well. This is in large part due to the band's 2015 trip to Cuba; in fact, the song Santiago is titled after the Cuban city of the same name. Semisonic’s Dan Wilson co-wrote the track One Hundred Fires.

== Track listing ==
The record contains 7 songs, all of which are original compositions by the Preservation Hall Jazz Band. This continues the trend of their previous album That's It, which was the first album of all original material in the band's 50 year history.

1. So It Is
2. Santiago
3. Innocence
4. La Malanga
5. Convergence
6. One Hundred Fires
7. Mad

== Band members ==
- Ben Jaffe – tuba, double bass
- Branden Lewis – trumpet
- Ronell Johnson – trombone
- Charlie Gabriel – clarinet, tenor saxophone
- Clint Maegden – tenor saxophone
- Kyle Roussell – piano
- Walter Harris – drums

== Critical reception ==
AllMusic.com gave the album four out of five stars.

"A marriage of the infectious street parade rhythms endemic of New Orleans bands and the vibrant dance pulse at the heart of much Cuban music" - LA Times

"If 2013's 'That's It!' marked a creative step forward for the Preservation Hall Jazz Band—their first recording in 50 years to feature all original compositions—then the new So It Is represents a flying leap" – Jazz Times

"The album grooves nonstop" – Entertainment Weekly

"Raw, no-holds-barred jazz and blues that they helped personally create a renaissance for, while surreptitiously luring their listeners into what often explodes into a full-on Afro-Latin dance party" – AllMusic

"Ferociously powerful collection of — there's no better phrase — fucking jams" – Stereogum

"Preservation Hall Jazz Band channel the verve of traditional Cuban music" – Rolling Stone

== Appearances ==
On April 27, 2017, the band performed with Jon Batiste & Stay Human on The Late Show with Stephen Colbert. For the song "Santiago" surprise guest Dave Grohl played drums. Grohl collaborated with the Preservation Hall Jazz Band during the Foo Fighter's Sonic Highways HBO miniseries and album.

== Charts ==
Chart (2017)	Peak position
Billboard Traditional Jazz	1
Billboard Jazz	2
