= Big Al Carson =

American blues and jazz singer (1953–2020)

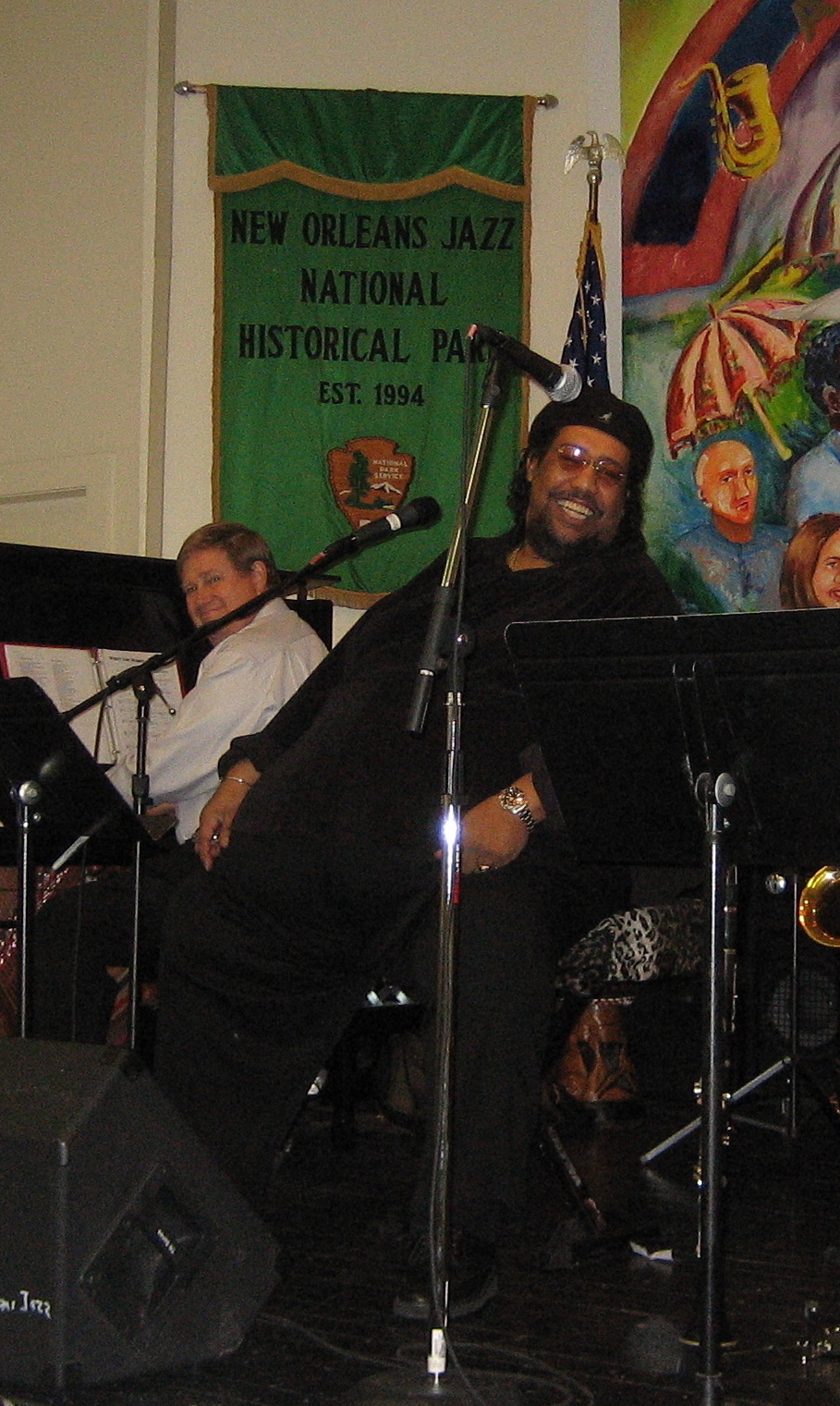
Big Al Carson (right), with pianist Lars Edegran (left)

Alton "Big Al" Carson (October 2, 1953 – April 26, 2020) was an American blues and jazz singer from New Orleans. He performed with his band, the Blues Masters, in New Orleans, and with other bands.

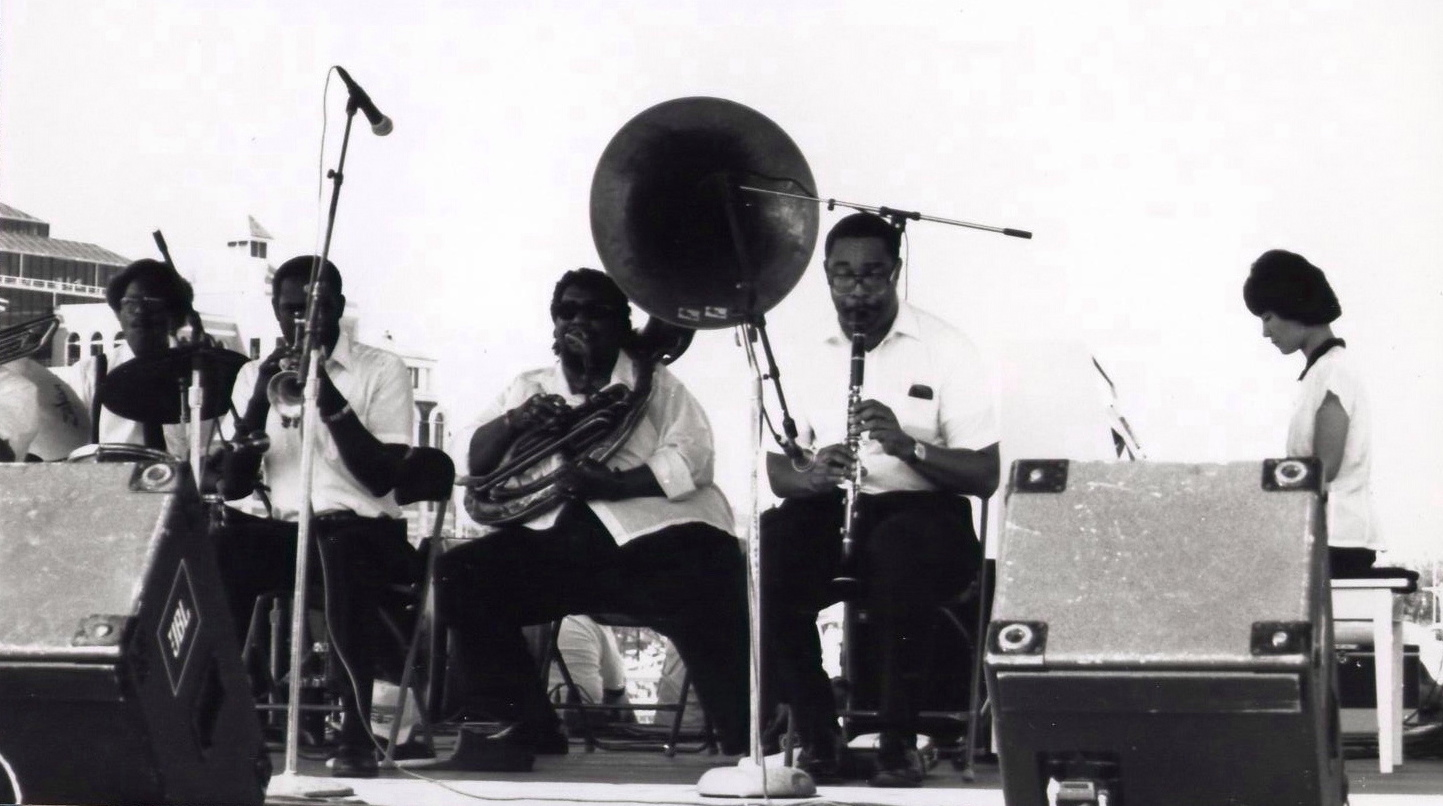
Carson on sousaphone with Dr. Michael White's Liberty Jazz Band, 1990

In addition to singing, he played tuba (or more specifically Sousaphone), including with such New Orleans brass bands as the Eagle Brass Band, the Spirit of New Orleans Brass Band and the Young Tuxedo Brass Band. Carson performed and recorded with multiple jazz and brass bands in New Orleans, including under the leadership of Doc Paulin, Lars Edegran, and Dr. Michael White.

In 1994, he traveled to Europe on a New Orleans music tour, where he performed for the Dutch royal family. The tour included Aaron Neville and Ernie K-Doe.

He died on April 26, 2020, at the age of 66 after a heart attack.
