= Allan Jaffe =

American jazz musician

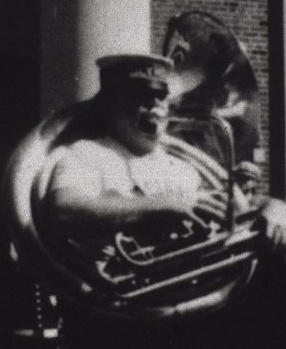
- Jaffe seen at left playing bass horn behind Olympia Brass Band grand marshal "King" Richard Matthews at "jazz funeral", 1981

Background information
- Born: Pottsville, Pennsylvania
- Died: New Orleans, Louisiana
- Instrument: Sousaphone
- Spouse: Sandra Jaffe

Allan Phillip Jaffe (April 24, 1935, Pottsville, Pennsylvania – March 9, 1987, New Orleans) was an American jazz tubist and the entrepreneur who, along with his wife Sandra, developed Preservation Hall into a New Orleans jazz tradition. He played the sousaphone in the Preservation Hall house band.

Jaffe's grandfather was Russian-Jewish as was his father-the grandfather played french horn in the Imperial Russian Army. His father was a mandolin player and teacher. Jaffe learned piano and cornet before settling on tuba in junior high school. He studied at the Wharton School at the University of Pennsylvania before joining the Army. He was stationed to Fort Polk, Louisiana.

Jaffe was living in New Orleans in 1961, when he took over management and creative direction of Preservation Hall with his wife Sandra. As owner of the facility, he played a major role in the New Orleans jazz revival of the 1960s, shepherding the latter-day careers of George Lewis, Jim Robinson, Alcide Pavageau, Punch Miller, Chester Zardis, Kid Sheik Cola, Percy Humphrey, Willie Humphrey, Kid Thomas Valentine, Billie and De De Pierce, and others.

He also played the tuba in the Preservation Hall Jazz Band and took the group on tours worldwide, booking them into the finest music and performance halls and making appearances at cultural events of note even in small communities.

Jaffe's son, Ben Jaffe, is a double-bass and tuba player, who now leads and performs with the Preservation Hall Jazz Band.

Jaffe died of cancer at age 51 on March 9, 1987. He is interred at Chevra Thilim cemetery in New Orleans.
