= Ben Jaffe =

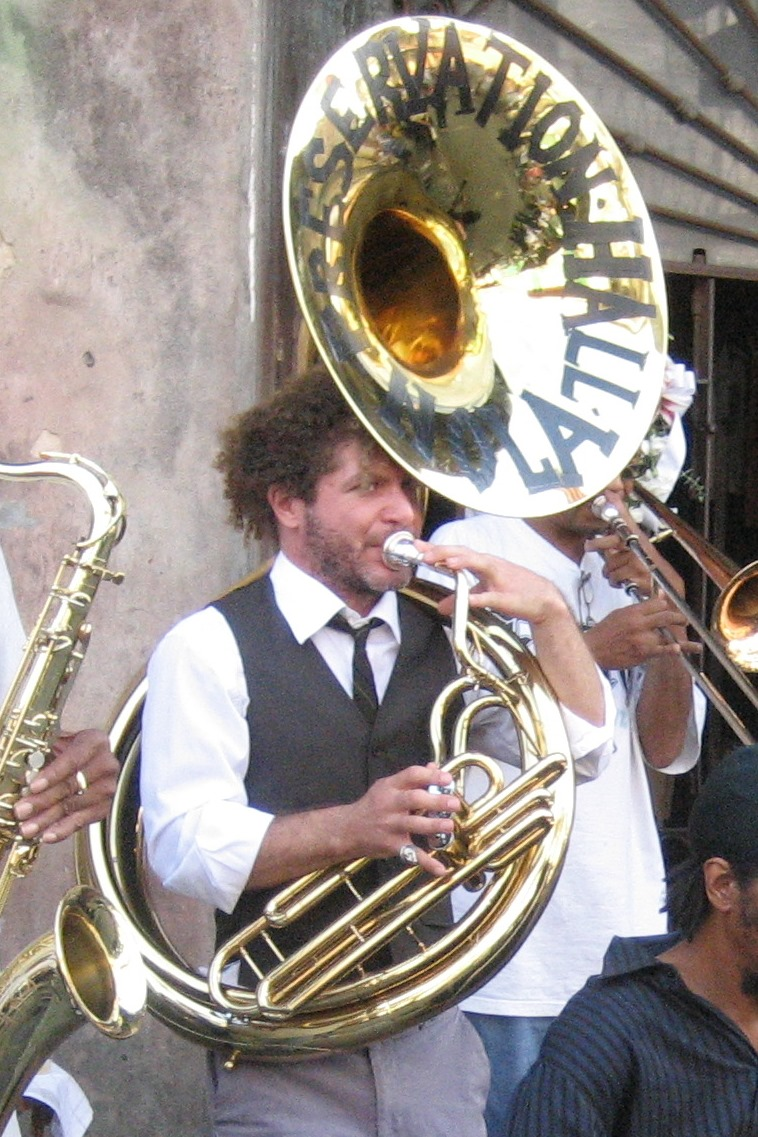
- Jaffe playing sousaphone with the Preservation Hall Jazz Band, 2007

Background information
- Born: January 26, 1971 (age 54)
- Genres: Jazz, New Orleans Jazz
- Instrument(s): Tuba, double bass
- Website: preservationhalljazzband.com

Benjamin Jaffe (born January 26, 1971) is the creative director of Preservation Hall and plays tuba and double bass with the Preservation Hall Jazz Band.

== Early life and education ==
He is the son of Preservation Hall's former managers, Allan Jaffe and Sandra Jaffe. Jaffe grew up in New Orleans' French Quarter, two blocks from Preservation Hall. His father, Allan, in addition to managing the Preservation Hall Jazz Band and Preservation Hall, played tuba with the band as well. From birth, Ben was brought on tour with the band during their international tours. Ben’s early musical memories are marching alongside his father in Mardi Gras Parades and jazz funeral processions. He began playing in grammar school at McDonogh 15 School for the Creative Arts in the French Quarter. During high school at NOCCA, he studied upright bass under Walter Payton. After high school, Ben attended Oberlin College where he received a degree in bass performance in 1992.

== Career ==
Following his graduation, Ben returned to New Orleans, resumed his father's position as manager of the Preservation Hall venue and joined the Preservation Hall Jazz Band on tour playing bass. Benjamin produced a number of albums for the Preservation Hall band, and most recently co-produced the band's first album of original compositions "That's It," alongside My Morning Jacket frontman Jim James.

Benjamin serves as the Chairman of the Board of the Preservation Hall Foundation, the charitable non-profit that serves the mission to "protect, preserve and perpetuate New Orleans jazz music and culture."

In episode 6 of "Foo Fighters: Sonic Highways," Dave Grohl interviews Ben about his parents' role in preserving New Orleans jazz, the history of Preservation Hall and Jaffe's current role as director, operating the hall.

In 2019, Jaffe narrated the documentary A Tuba to Cuba about the Preservation Hall Jazz Band visit to Cuba in December 2015. The documentary follows the Band's travels to Cuba to retrace the connection between the New Orleans jazz music tradition and indigenous Cuban music. This was a goal of the late co-founder of Preservation Hall, Allan Jaffe.

== Discography ==
=== Preservation Hall Jazz Band ===
- New Orleans Vol. 1 (Columbia, 1977)
- New Orleans Vol. 2 (CBS, 1982)
- When the Saints Go Marchin' In (CBS, 1983)
- New Orleans Vol. 4 (CBS, 1988)
- Preservation Hall Jazz Band Live (Sony Masterworks, 1992)
- In the Sweet Bye and Bye (Sony Classical, 1996)
- Because of You (Sony Classical, 1998)
- Songs of New Orleans (Preservation Hall, 1999)
- Shake That Thing (Preservation Hall, 2004)
- The Hurricane Sessions (3M, 2007)
- New Orleans Preservation Volume 1 (Preservation Hall, 2009)
- An Album to Benefit Preservation Hall and The Preservation Hall Music Outreach Program (Preservation Hall, 2010)
- St. Peter & 57th (Rounder, 2012)
- That's It (Legacy, 2013)
- So It Is (Legacy, 2017)
- Run, Stop, and Drop (The Needle) (Legacy, 2017)
- A Tuba to Cuba (Sub Pop, 2019)

=== Collaborations ===
- Our New Orleans (2005)
- Goin' Home: A Tribute to Fats Domino (2007)
- Death of a Street Singer by Jeremy Lyons and The Deltabilly Boys (2007)
- New Orleans Jazz by Lars Edegran (2008)
- New Orlean's Seventh Ward Griot by Carl LeBlanc (2008)
- Down in New Orleans by The Blind Boys of Alabama (2008)
- Magnificent Beast by MarchFourth Marching Band (2011)
- Bad as Me by Tom Waits (2011)
- Sonic Highways by Foo Fighters (2014)
- Kokomo Kidd by Guy Davis (2015)
- Shadowbox by Beats Antique (2016)
