= Charlie Gabriel =

American jazz musician

- Born: July 11, 1932 (age 93); New Orleans, Louisiana
- Occupation: Jazz musician
- Instruments: Clarinet, Trumpet, Flute, Saxophone
- Member of: Preservation Hall Jazz Band

Charlie Gabriel (born July 11, 1932) is an African American jazz musician who plays the saxophone, trumpet, clarinet, and flute.

== Career ==
Following his family's departure from his native New Orleans, Gabriel made a career for himself in the Detroit area, where several of his descendants and family members have also become successful jazz musicians in the brass tradition. He played in the Eureka Brass Band and in the bands of Lionel Hampton and Aretha Franklin. While in Detroit, he was a co-founder of the Jazz on the Lawn series at St. Augustine and St. Monica Catholic Church.

He later returned to New Orleans, and has been a member of the Preservation Hall Jazz Band since 2006. Gabriel is the Preservation Hall Foundation's musical director. His first album released as a solo artist, 89, was released in 2022.

== Personal life ==
Gabriel is Catholic and is married to Marsha Gabriel. His siblings are Florence Simmons, August Gabriel and Joe Gabriel.

== Awards and honors ==
=== OffBeat's Best of the Beat Awards ===
Year	Category	Result	Ref.
2013	Best Clarinetist	Won	
2019	Lifetime Achievement in Music	Won	
