= Andy Anderson (trumpeter) =

- Born: Andrew Anderson; August 10, 1905; Mandeville, Louisiana, United States
- Died: December 19, 1982 (aged 77) New Orleans, Louisiana, United States
- Genres: Jazz
- Occupations: Trumpeter, composer, bandleader
- Instrument: Trumpet
- Years active: 1920s–1971

Andy Anderson (August 10, 1905 (Note: Several sources give Anderson's date of birth as August 12, 1905 including Grove Music Online. However, this date does not match primary documents. Anderson's military records in the U.S., World War II Draft Cards Young Men, 1940-1947 and the U.S., Department of Veterans Affairs BIRLS Death File, 1850-2020 both give his date of birth as August 10, 1905. The U.S., Social Security Death Index, 1935-2014 also gives his day of birth as August 10, but with the year 1903 instead of 1905.) –- December 19, 1982) was an African-American jazz trumpeter, composer, and bandleader.

== Life and career ==
Andrew Anderson was born in Mandeville, Louisiana on August 10, 1905. The son of George Anderson, his father was a double bass player who worked as a member of Bunk Johnson's band from 1915-1918. He learned to play the trumpet from his older brother and began performing in his native town with informal local bands. He later studied jazz with Pinchback Touro.

In c. 1922 Anderson relocated to New Orleans where he began working as a musician. In the mid 1920s he was a member of a band led by jazz violinist Willie J. Foster (1888-1969) before establishing his own group, the Pelican Silvertone Band which he directed. He played in shows with performers Polo Barnes, Jim Robinson, and Armand J. Piron; performing with the latter man in a band on the riverboat SS Capitol. From 1934-1940 he was a member of Papa Celestin's Tuxedo Band. He led his own band in recordings made in 1939 and 1942; one of which was his own composition Chant of the Tuxedos (1939).

Anderson was working as a member of Oscar Celestin's band when he was drafted into the United States Army Air Forces in 1942. He served in the army during World War II from October 13, 1942 through August 29, 1945. After the war he led his own six member band, and deputized for Celestin in the 1950s. In 1959 he recorded with the Young Tuxedo Brass Band on the Atlantic Studios record Jazz Begins: Sounds of New Orleans Streets; Funeral and Parade Music. That same year he made recordings with George Lewis on Verve Records.

Other groups Anderson performed with included the Henry Allen Brass Band and the Eureka Brass Band. He was principally active with John Casimir's Young Tuxedo Brass Band and the Olympia Brass Band (OBB) from the late 1950s into the early 1970s. With the OBB he toured Europe in 1968. He appeared several times at Preservation Hall in his latter career, and in 1967 he played on Lars Edegran's record Grace and Beauty. He retired after losing four of his front teeth in 1971.

Anderson died in New Orleans on December 19, 1982.
