= John Casimir (clarinetist) =

American jazz clarinetist and bandleader (1898–1963)

- Born: October 16, 1898; New Orleans, Louisiana, U.S.
- Died: January 3, 1963 (aged 64) New Orleans, Louisiana, U.S.
- Genres: Jazz
- Instruments: Clarinet

John Casimir (October 16, 1898 – January 3, 1963) was an American jazz clarinetist and bandleader, best remembered as the leader of The Young Tuxedo Brass Band for some 20 years up to his death.

Casimir started playing professionally with the Young Eagles Band with Lee Collins in 1919. He was also a member of the Original Tuxedo Brass Band, often following the lead of Louis Armstrong.

The Young Tuxedo Brass Band's 1958 album was released under the title Jazz Begins by Atlantic Records. It was the only recording the band released under Casimir's leadership. He also led a dance band using some of the same musicians under the name the Young Tuxedo Jazz Band, which also recorded. He played B♭ clarinet with the jazz band and the distinctive higher E♭ clarinet with brass bands.

== Source ==
- New Orleans Jazz: A Family Album by Al Rose and Edmond Souchon, Third Edition, Louisiana State University Press, 1984
