= Walter Payton (musician) =

American musician (1942–2010)

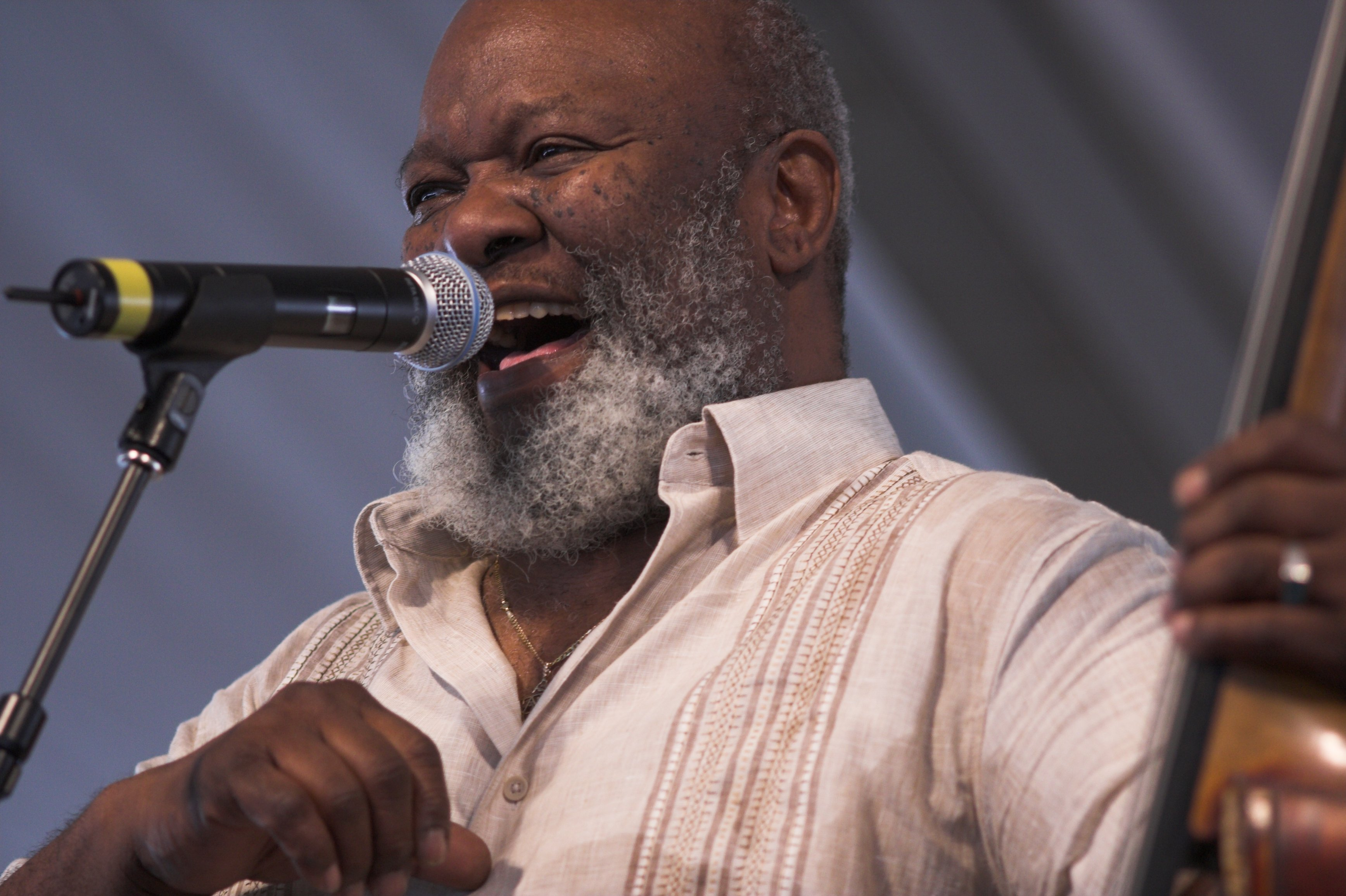
Walter Payton in 2008.

Walter Payton, Jr. (August 23, 1942 – October 28, 2010) was an American jazz bassist and sousaphonist.

Payton was born in New Orleans, Louisiana. He played with the Preservation Hall Jazz Band, the French Market Jazz Hall Band and the Young Tuxedo Brass Band, and led his own group called the Snap Bean Band. His recording credits include Lee Dorsey's "Working in the Coal Mine", and Payton variously worked with Aaron Neville, Harry Connick Jr., Champion Jack Dupree and Chuck Carbo. Payton appeared on Saturday Night Live (Walter Payton/Walter Payton).[citation needed]

Payton died in his hometown of New Orleans, after an illness, aged 68. He was the father of jazz trumpet player Nicholas Payton.
