= Michael White (clarinetist) =

American jazz clarinetist and educator (born 1954)

- White at the 2026 Richmond Folk Festival

Background information
- Born: November 29, 1954 (age 71); New Orleans, Louisiana, U.S.
- Genres: Jazz, traditional New Orleans jazz
- Occupations: Musician, educator
- Instrument: Clarinet
- Labels: Basin Street, Antilles, 504
- Formerly of: The New Orleans Hot Seven, The Original Liberty Jazz Band, Young Tuxedo Brass Band

Michael White (born November 29, 1954) is a jazz clarinetist, bandleader, composer, jazz historian and musical educator. Jazz critic Scott Yanow said in a review that White "displays the feel and spirit of the best New Orleans clarinetists".

== Early life ==
White was born in New Orleans, Louisiana and raised Catholic by a father who was a Knight of Peter Claver. He attended a number of Black Catholic schools in the city, including Saint Francis de Sales, Holy Ghost, and St Joan of Arc. While at the latter school, he studied clarinet and played in his first parade. He graduated from Xavier University of Louisiana in 1976, and earned both a master's and doctorate in Spanish from Tulane University.

== Career ==
White at the Richmond Folk Festival in Richmond, Virginia in 2026

White is a classically trained musician who began his jazz musical career as a teenager playing for Doc Paulin's Brass Band in New Orleans. He was a member of an incarnation of the Fairview Baptist Church Marching Band, established by banjoist Danny Barker. He was discovered by Kid Sheik Colar, who heard him performing in Jackson Square in the French Quarter. White began working regularly with Colar. White can be heard on the 1989 album The Majesty of the Blues by Wynton Marsalis. Marsalis appears on White's 1990 album Crescent City Serenade with Wendell Brunious and Walter Payton.

Since 1979, White has played in the Young Tuxedo Brass Band, founded by clarinetist John Casimir sometime in the 1940s. During the 1980s, he led a band called The New Orleans Hot Seven. Performing "A Tribute to Jelly Roll Morton" in concert with them at the Lincoln Center in New York City in 1989 led to a favorable review by Jon Pareles in The New York Times. On May 25, 2004, a selection from White's album Dancing in the Sky ("Algiers Hoodoo Woman") was broadcast on NPR's All Songs Considered. The Dancing in the Sky album is mostly original compositions by White.

In 1981, White founded The Original Liberty Jazz Band to preserve the musical heritage of New Orleans. The group has performed an end-of-year concert at the Village Vanguard every year since the early 1990s. On May 13, 2006, White performed "Just a Closer Walk With Thee" at the Tulane University commencement ceremony. Former U.S. presidents George H. W. Bush and Bill Clinton were in attendance at the ceremony. Clinton said that the music "was played the way Dixieland bands have always done it. At first low, weeping, sorrowful."

== Other endeavors ==
White is also a college professor who formerly taught Spanish, now teaching African-American music at Xavier University of Louisiana, an historically black university. At the university, he holds the Rosa and Charles Keller Endowed Chair in the Humanities of New Orleans Music and Culture. He has also served as guest director at several Jazz at Lincoln Center concerts relating to traditional New Orleans jazz, often working with Wynton Marsalis. White has also served as a commissioner for the New Orleans Jazz National Historical Park.

== Personal life ==
White was living in a one-story home in the Gentilly district of New Orleans, near the London Avenue Canal during Hurricane Katrina in 2005. White was a collector of jazz artifacts and local history for 30 years. He owned the original sheet music of "Dead Man Blues" by Jelly Roll Morton, a clarinet mouthpiece by Sidney Bechet, and an estimated 5,000 records and LPs which were lost during the flooding.

== Discography ==
Year	Album	Notes	Label
2012	Adventures in New Orleans Jazz, Part 2	-	Basin Street
2011	Adventures in New Orleans Jazz, Part 1	-	Basin Street
2008	Blue Crescent	-	Basin Street
2005	Our New Orleans: A Benefit Album for the Gulf Coast	-	Nonesuch
2005	Songs of New Orleans: Preservation Hall Jazz Band	Preservation Hall album	Preservation Hall
2004	Dancing in the Sky		Basin Street
2002	Jazz From the Soul of New Orleans	-	Basin Street
2000	A Song For George Lewis	-	Basin Street
2000	A Tribute to Johnny Dodds	-	Jazz Crusade
2000	Dance @ the Dew Drop	-	GHB
2000	Shake It and Break It (expanded reissue)	-	504
1992	New Year's Eve Live at the Village Vanguard	-	Antilles
1990	Crescent City Serenade	-	Antilles
1989	The Majesty of the Blues	-	Columbia
1987	Shake It and Break It	-	504
1984	T'Ain't Nobody's Business	-	504
1983	Jazz Continues: Young Tuxedo Brass Band	-	504

== Awards and honors ==
- 1994 Royal Norwegian Musical Medal (Norway)
- 1995 Chevalier of Arts and Letters (France)
- 2008 National Heritage Fellowship awarded by the National Endowment for the Arts, which is the United States government's highest honor in the folk and traditional arts

== Notes ==
The discography used allmusicguide.com as one guide.
