= The Majesty of the Blues =

Studio album by Wynton Marsalis
- Released: June 13, 1989
- Recorded: 27 October & 28 October 1988
- Studio: RCA Studio A
- Genre: Jazz
- Length: 59:57
- Label: Columbia
- Producer: Steven Epstein, George Butler

Wynton Marsalis chronology
Works by Husa, Copland, Vaughan Williams, and Hindemith (1989)	The Majesty of the Blues (1989)	Crescent City Christmas Card (1989)

Professional ratings
Review scores
Source	Rating
AllMusic	3/5 stars
The Penguin Guide to Jazz Recordings	3/4 stars
Rolling Stone	4/5 stars

The Majesty of the Blues is an album by jazz trumpeter Wynton Marsalis that was released in 1989.

== Background ==
The first two selections on the album are played by the Wynton Marsalis Sextet.

The remaining three tracks (side B on the original LP release), a set entitled "New Orleans Function", feature the sextet with additional New Orleans musicians in a style influenced by the traditional New Orleans brass band. This section mirrors a traditional jazz funeral, with a dirge-like first selection ("The Death of Jazz"), then a spoken word section ("Premature Autopsies", an essay by Stanley Crouch performed by Jeremiah Wright) and preached like a minister at a graveyard, and a second line number ("Oh, But on the Third Day – Happy Feet Blues").

== Track listing ==
All tracks are written by Wynton Marsalis except where noted.

Side A (The Wynton Marsalis Sextet)
No.	Title	Length
1.	"The Majesty of the Blues (The Puheeman Strut)"	15:06
2.	"Hickory Dickory Dock"	9:06

Side B (The New Orleans Function)
No.	Title	Writer(s)	Length
3.	"The Death of Jazz"		12:39
4.	"Premature Autopsies (Sermon)"	Marsalis, Stanley Crouch	16:22
5.	"Oh, but on the Third Day (Happy Feet Blues)"		6:44

== Personnel ==
=== The Wynton Marsalis Sextet ===
- Wynton Marsalis – trumpet
- Todd Williams – tenor and soprano saxophones
- Wessell Anderson – alto saxophone
- Marcus Roberts – piano
- Reginald Veal – double bass
- Herlin Riley – drums

=== The New Orleans Function ===
Composed of the Wynton Marsalis Sextet and the following:

- Wynton Marsalis – second trumpet and plunger mute
- Teddy Riley – first trumpet
- Freddie Lonzo – trombone
- Michael White – clarinet
- Danny Barker – banjo

=== Technical personnel ===
- Steven Epstein – producer
- George Butler – executive producer
- Tim Geelan – engineer
- Dennis Ferrante – assistant engineer
