= Lionel Ferbos =

American jazz trumpeter (1911–2014)

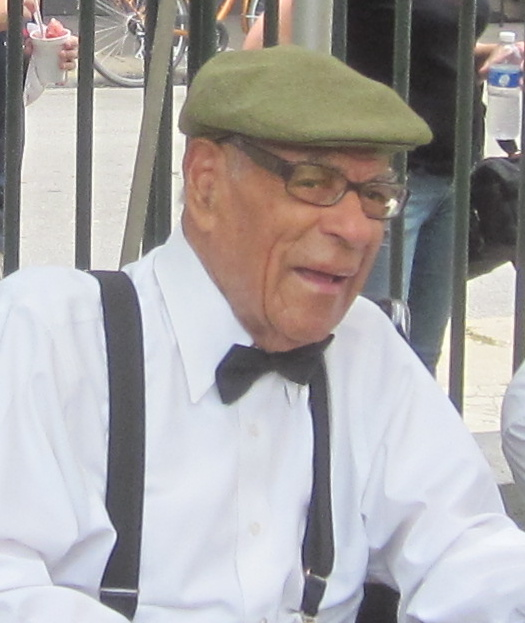
- Ferbos at age 101, before going on stage to play a set with the New Orleans Ragtime Orchestra in 2012.

Background information
- Born: Lionel Charles Ferbos; July 17, 1911; New Orleans, Louisiana, United States
- Died: July 19, 2014 (aged 103) New Orleans, Louisiana, United States
- Genres: Jazz
- Occupation: Trumpeter
- Instrument: Trumpet

Lionel Charles Ferbos (July 17, 1911 – July 19, 2014) was an American jazz trumpeter. He was from New Orleans, Louisiana.

At 103, Ferbos was the oldest jazz musician in New Orleans. A native New Orleanian whose career centered almost exclusively in the city, he appeared weekly at the Palm Court Jazz Cafe, a French Quarter club, where he led the Palm Court Jazz Band on Saturday nights.

During his long career, Ferbos worked with some of the giants of early traditional jazz, including Captain John Handy and Mamie Smith, and, in later years, with widely recognized contemporary revivals of the old style music like the original stage band of the off-Broadway hit One Mo' Time. He played at all of the New Orleans Jazz & Heritage Festivals.

== Early life ==
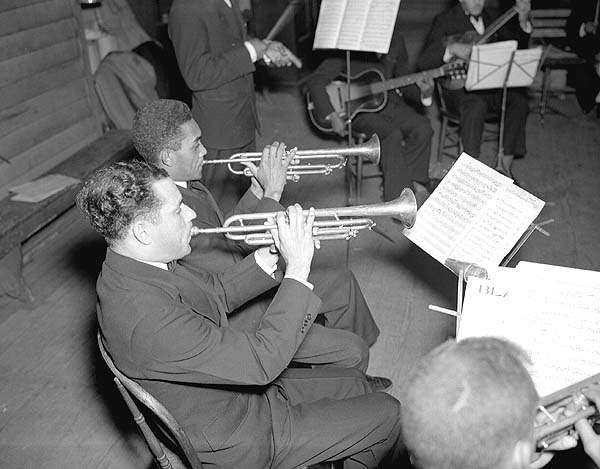
Ferbos with the New Orleans WPA Band, 1937

Lionel Ferbos was born on July 17, 1911, in New Orleans, in the city's Creole 7th Ward. He said he had asthma and his parents would not let him take up a wind instrument, but when he was 15 he saw Phil Spitalny's all-girl orchestra at the Orpheum and argued that he ought to be able to do anything a girl could do. So he got an old cornet at a pawn shop on Rampart Street and began lessons with Professor Paul Chaligny, an exacting Creole task-master who would not let him blow the horn until he knew how to read music and had mastered the rudiments of theory. After a year with Chaligny, Ferbos moved on to study with noted musicians Albert Snaer and Eugene Ware.

== Early career ==
Ferbos' first professional music jobs were in the early 1930s with society jazz bands like the Starlight Serenaders and the Moonlight Serenaders, performing at well-known New Orleans venues like the Pythian Roof Garden, Pelican Club, San Jacinto Hall, Autocrat Club, Southern Yacht Club and the New Orleans Country Club. In 1932, he joined Captain Handy's Louisiana Shakers and played the Astoria and toured the Gulf Coast. He later backed blues singer Mamie Smith while playing with the Fats Pichon Band. During the Depression, he worked as a laborer in New Orleans City Park for the Works Progress Administration, then played first trumpet in the WPA jazz band, of which he is the last surviving member. In the 1940s, he played on Lake Pontchartrain at the Happy Landing and Mama Lou's, and in the '50s he worked with Harold Dejan at the Melody Inn, where he recorded with the "Mighty Four." In the '60s he played with Herbert Leary's Orchestra.

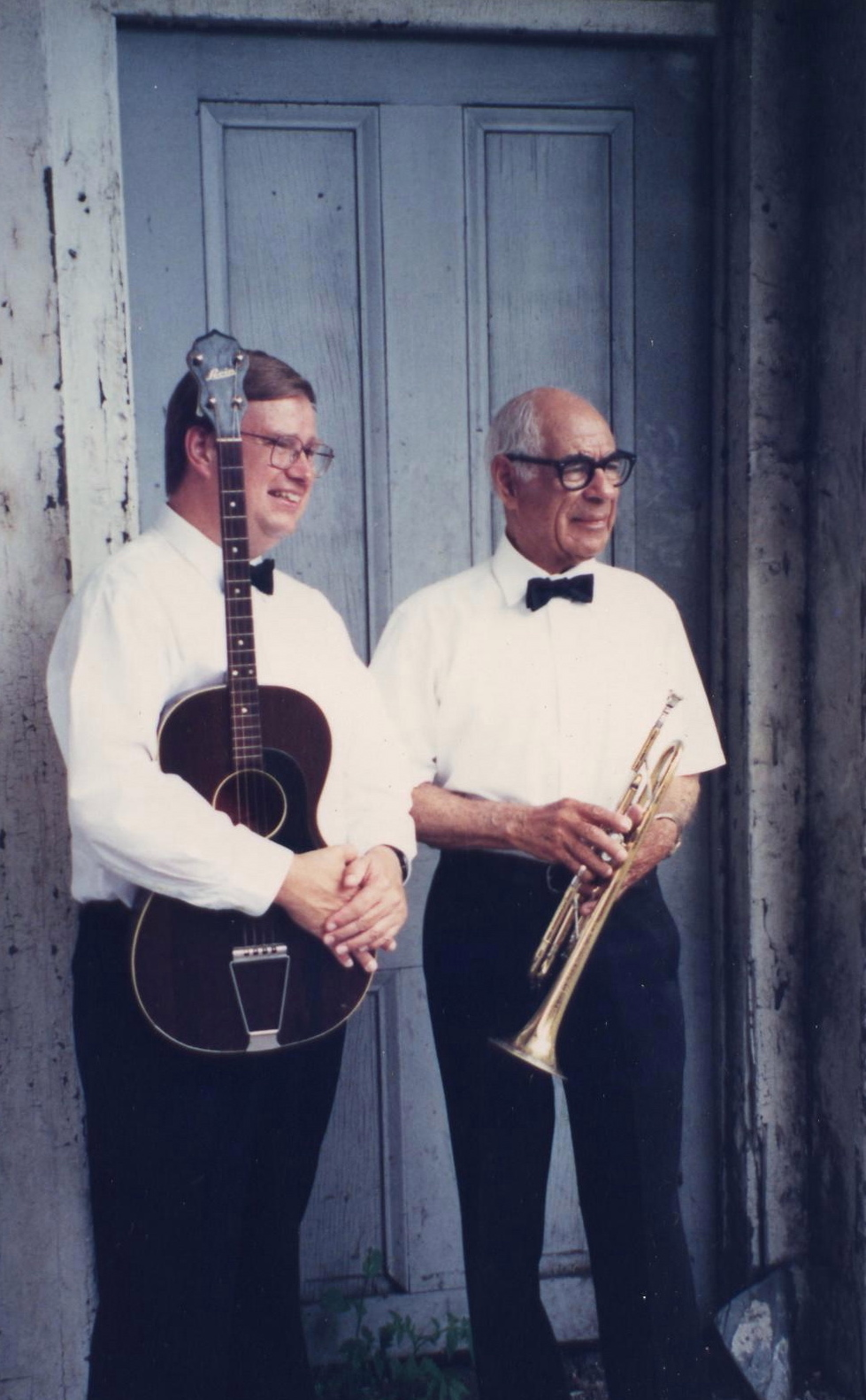
Lionel Ferbos, right, with Lars Edegran (1996)

Because of his ability to read sheet music, Ferbos found himself in demand. Although he wasn't a "hot player", as he described it, he said he never had to scramble for work because people came to him with musical offers. When Danny Barker founded the now-famous Fairview Baptist band to train a young generation of New Orleans musicians, Ferbos was asked to write out all their charts.

=== Later career ===
Until he reached retirement age, Ferbos kept his day job, so his musical work was mostly in and around New Orleans. During his career he held a job at Haspel's Clothing Factory in the early 1930s. It was here that he met a seamstress, Marguerite Gilyot, who became his wife. She died in January 2009 after 75 years of marriage. In the 1940s, Ferbos went to work in his father's sheet-metal business and became a master metal worker. His artistry as a tinsmith was featured in the acclaimed exhibition on Creole building arts at the New Orleans Museum of Art. In the 1970s, he dropped out of the hit musical One Mo' Time when it moved to New York, rather than leave town. However, he made eight tours of Europe with the New Orleans Ragtime Orchestra, formed to revive the old music unearthed in the jazz archives at Tulane University. He was trumpeter with the Ragtime on the soundtrack of the 1978 movie Pretty Baby.

Ferbos won the 2003 Big Easy Lifetime Achievement Award and was frequently called on to tell about his experiences in the Depression, as well as in music and with tinsmithing, on panels and in history classes. In 2005, Hurricane Katrina forced him to Plaquemines Parish, Louisiana, where he lived with relatives until he could return to his native New Orleans.

Despite his long career, Lionel Ferbos made few early recordings. After he joined the Ragtime and the Palm Court bands, he was recorded on several CDs on the GHB label. He was also featured on other recent recordings with New Orleans headliners on specialty labels.

== Personal life ==
Lionel Ferbos had a daughter, Sylvia Schexnayder, and was pre-deceased by wife Marguerite Gilyot Ferbos and son Lionel Ferbos Jr.

Ferbos died on the morning of July 19, 2014, at his home in New Orleans. He was 103 years old.

== See also ==
- List of centenarians (musicians, composers and music patrons)
