= De De Pierce =

American jazz trumpeter and cornetist

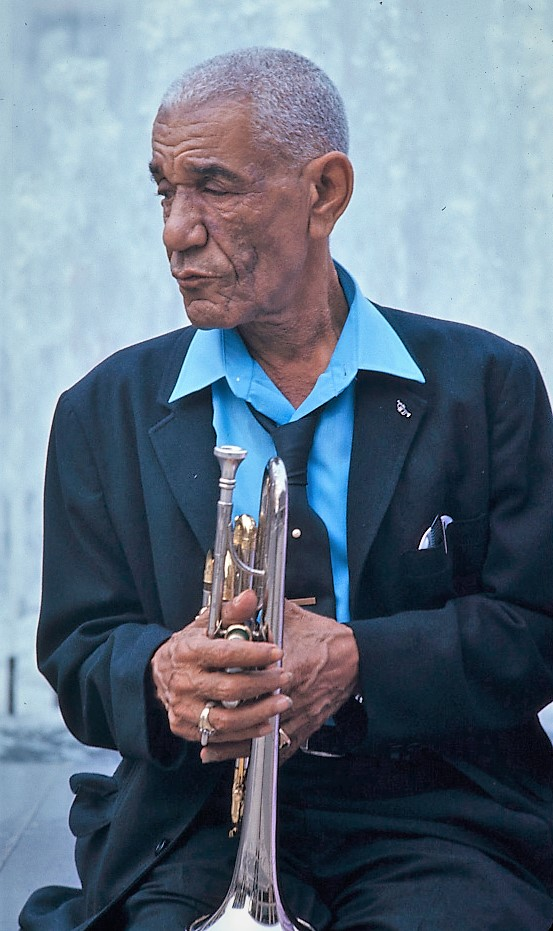
- Pierce in 1970s

Background information
- Born: February 18, 1904
- Died: November 23, 1973 (aged 69)
- Instrument(s): jazz trumpet, cornet

Joseph De Lacroix "De De" Pierce (February 18, 1904 – November 23, 1973) was an American jazz trumpeter and cornetist. He is best remembered for the songs "Peanut Vendor" and "Dippermouth Blues", both with Billie Pierce.

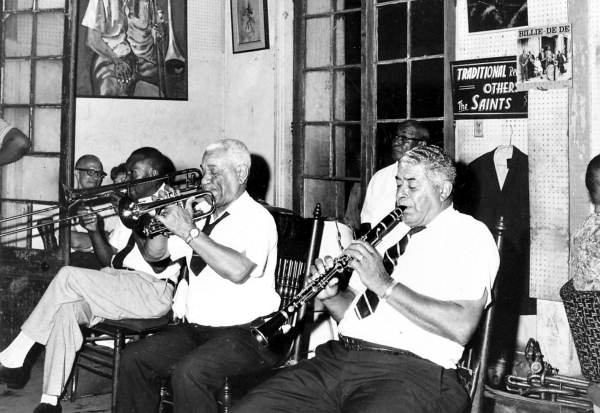
Pierce on trumpet in Preservation Hall, 1966, with Willie Humphrey on clarinet.

== Biography ==
Pierce was born Joseph De Lacroix Pierce in New Orleans, Louisiana, United States. Pierce's first gig was with Arnold Dupas in New Orleans in 1924.

During his time playing in city nightclubs, he met Billie Pierce, who became his wife as well as a musical companion; the two were the house band at the Luthjens Dance Hall from the 1930s through the 1950s. They released several albums together but stopped performing in the middle of the 1950s due to illness, which left De De Pierce blind.

By 1959, they had returned to performing, and De De Pierce toured with Ida Cox and played with the Preservation Hall Jazz Band, before further health problems ended his career.

He died in November 1973, at the age of 69. He received a Catholic jazz funeral.
