= Harold Dejan =

American jazz saxophonist and bandleader

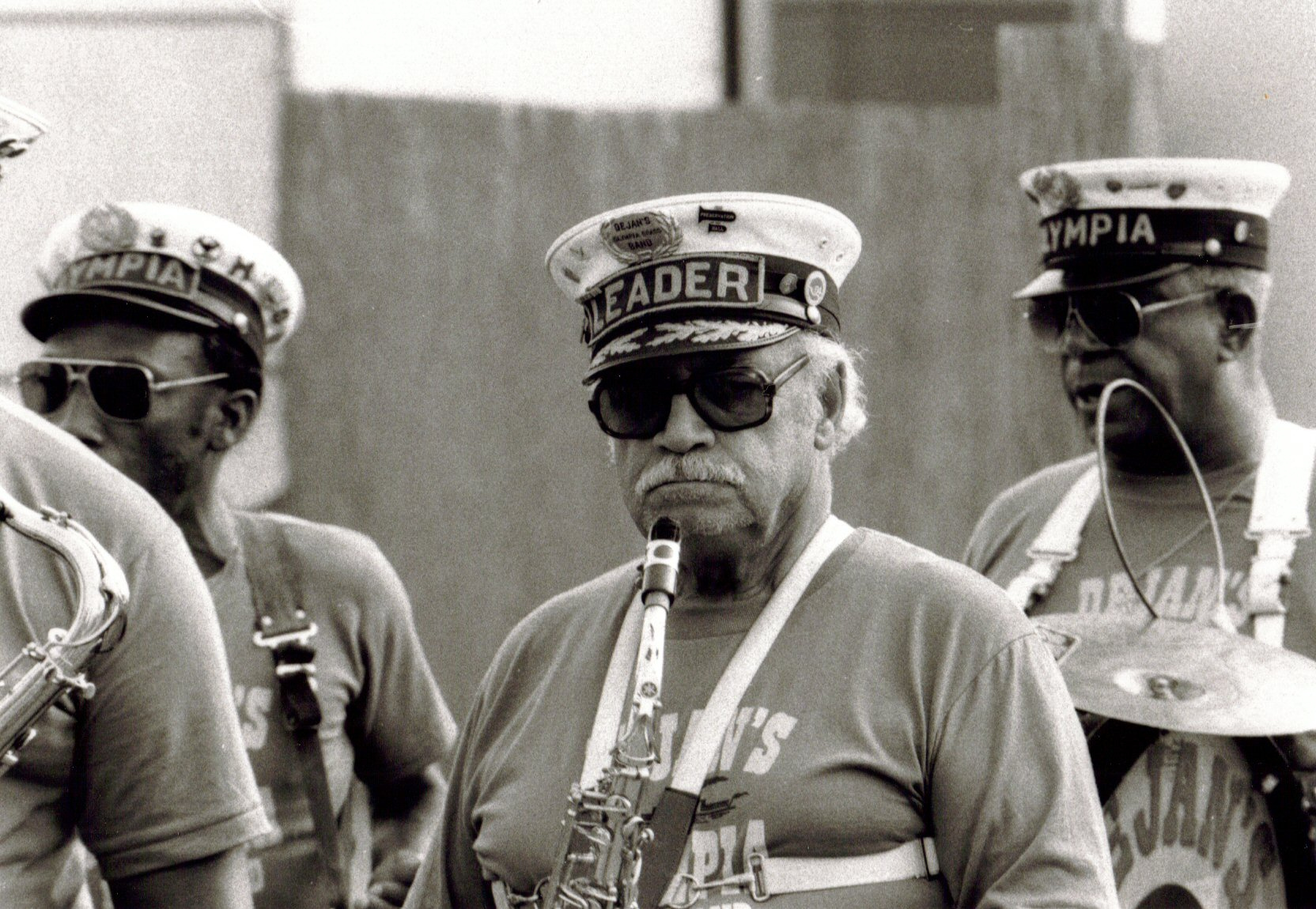
- Dejan (center) with Olympia Brass Band on tour in Austria, 1986

Background information
- Born: Harold Andrew Dejan; February 4, 1909; New Orleans, Louisiana, United States
- Died: July 5, 2002 (aged 93) New Orleans, Louisiana, U.S.
- Formerly of: Olympia Brass Band

Harold Andrew "Duke" Dejan (February 4, 1909 – July 5, 2002) was an American jazz alto saxophonist and bandleader in New Orleans. Dejan is best remembered as leader of the Olympia Brass Band during the 1960s and 1970s, when it was considered the top band in the city.

== Biography ==
Born into a Creole family in New Orleans, he took clarinet lessons as a child before switching to saxophone, and became a professional musician in his teens, joining the Olympia Serenaders and then the Holy Ghost Brass Band. He played regularly in Storyville, at Mahogany Hall, and on Mississippi riverboats. He also worked in the mail office of the Lykes Brothers Steamship Company for 23 years and played in Navy bands during World War II.

After the war, Dejan returned to his day job and his music career, leading his own band, Dejan's Olympia Brass Band, from 1951. The band often appeared at Preservation Hall, recorded nine albums, and toured internationally, making 30 concert tours of Europe and one of Africa. The band appeared in the James Bond movie Live and Let Die, and in many TV commercials.

In 1991 Dejan suffered a stroke, which left him unable to play the saxophone, but he continued as a band leader and singer until shortly before his death. He was buried at Saint Louis Cemetery No. 3 in New Orleans.
