= Billie Pierce =

American jazz pianist and singer (1907–1974)

Billie Goodson Pierce
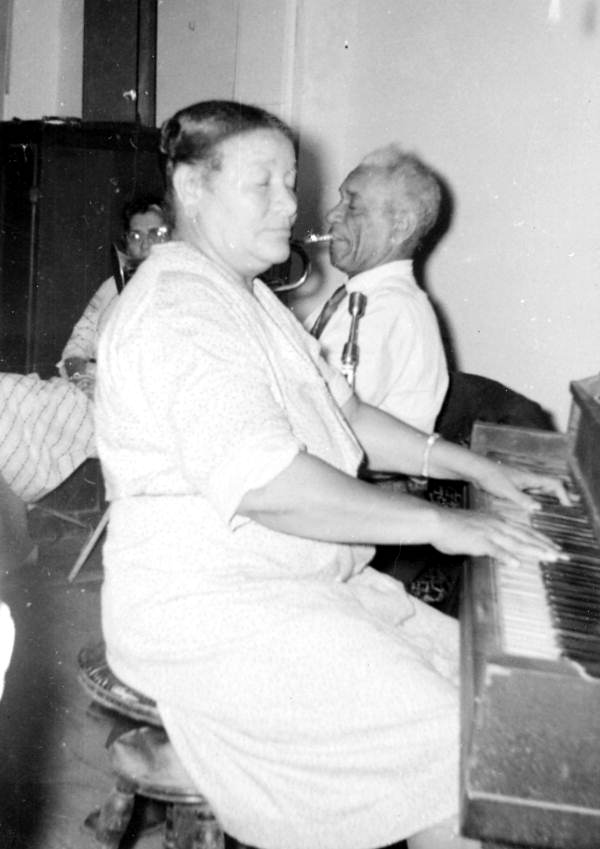
- Pierce playing the piano with husband De De Pierce on trumpet in the background, 1949

Background information
- Born: June 8, 1907; Marianna, Florida, U.S.
- Died: September 29, 1974 (aged 67) New Orleans, Louisiana, U.S.
- Genres: Jazz
- Occupations: Pianist, singer

Wilhelmina Madison Goodson (June 8, 1907 – September 29, 1974), known professionally as Billie Pierce, was an American jazz pianist and singer, who performed and recorded with her husband De De Pierce. Her style has been described as a "potent mixture of barrelhouse, boogie-woogie, and ragtime". After settling in New Orleans in 1930, she played in the bands of A.J. Piron, Alphonse Picou, Emile Barnes, and George Lewis.

== Early life ==
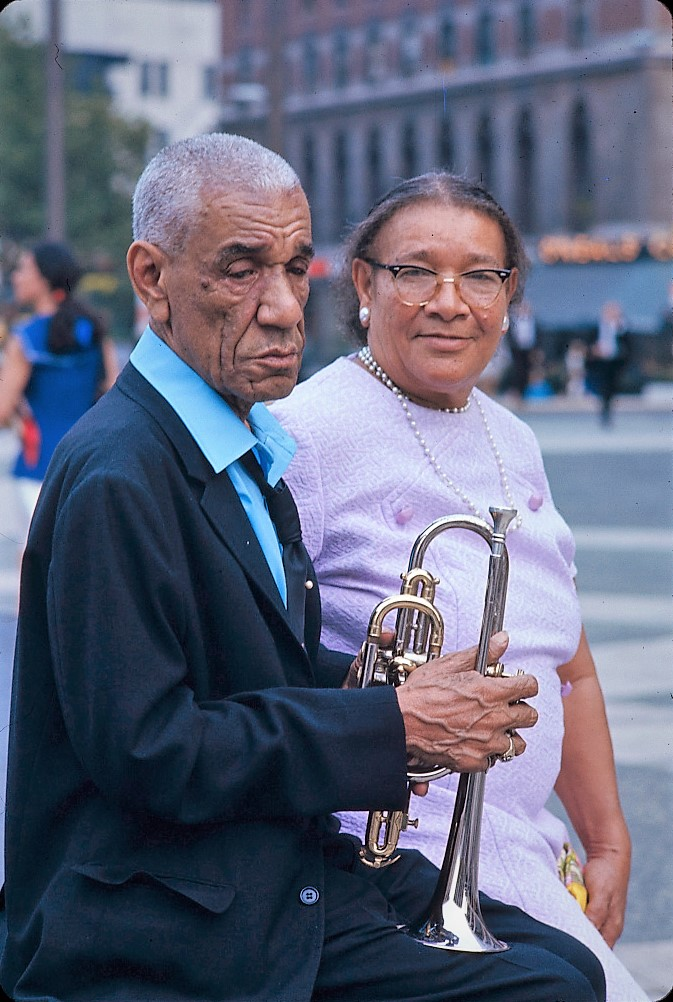
De De & Billie Pierce, 1970s

Wilhelmina (Billie) Goodson was born on June 8, 1907, in her mother's home town of Marianna, Florida, and grew up in Pensacola, Florida. She was one of six piano-playing sisters (including Ida Goodson and Sadie Goodson) whose father, Madison H. Goodson, and mother, Sarah Jenkins Goodson, also played the piano. There was a seventh daughter, Maggie, who died young. Billie was the second youngest of the girls; the order of the sisters from oldest to youngest went Mabel (b. 1899), Della (1901), Sadie (1903), Edna (1904), Billie (1907), and Ida (1909).

Goodson was never formally trained to read music. Both of her parents musicians, they played hymns and sang in the choir at the Baptist church where Madison Goodson was a Deacon. According to Billie, she was about two years old when she first started to play the piano.

Though her parents disapproved of ragtime, blues, and jazz, only playing religious music, Billie and her sisters were drawn to it. When Ms. Pierce was about ten years old, she and her sisters would go down to the Belmont Theatre to listen to Ma Rainey, Ida Cox, and Bessie Smith when they passed through Pensacola, Florida. In 1922, when Ms. Pierce was almost thirteen, Bessie Smith passed through town again. Bessie's pianist, Clarence Williams, suffered a heart attack and Ms. Pierce subbed in to played piano with Bessie Smith for two weeks at the Belmont Theatre.

== Career ==
At the age of 15 (in 1922), Pierce began playing piano professionally. Some accounts claim she toured with Gertrude "Ma" Rainey; however, during this time she was actually accompanying Ida Cox at the Belmont Theatre. After her time accompanying Ms. Cox, Billie toured as a singer, dancer, and pianist. At the beginning of the 1920s, Billie would only accompany bands on the Florida leg of their tours. In 1929, she was working in a nine-piece band named the Nighthawks Orchestra in Birmingham, Alabama when she heard that her sister, Sadie, had fallen ill and needed a temporary replacement. Sadie and her husband, Abbey "Chinee" Foster on drums, in Buddy Petit's band on the SS Madison in New Orleans.

Pierce settled in New Orleans in 1930. By the 1930s, she was leading a four-piece group at the Kingfish (also known as the Pig Pen). Pierce toured more widely with the Mighty Wiggle Carnival (owned by Jack Shaffer), Joe Jesse's orchestra, and her own touring review.

In 1932, she played piano with Alphonse Picou's five-piece (along with Johnny Dave, banjo; Ernest Milton, drums; Picou, clarinet; Lawrence Toca trumpet) at the Rialto Nightclub on Jefferson Davis Parkway for a couple of years. She performed at the Blue Jay Club, where she met trumpeter De De Pierce, who at the time was playing with a band led by Billie's sister at Mama's and Papa's, a nearby club. From 1933 to 1934, she and De De were members of a band including clarinetist, George Lewis, at a dime-a-dance hall, the Kingfish. Billie and De De married on March 28, 1935, at St. Peter Claver Church.

Billie Pierce first recorded with Emile Barnes in 1946 (issued in 1997) and under her own name in 1953.

Billie and De De Pierce played with their own ensemble, which served as the house band at Luthjen's Dance Hall on and off for 24 years. Billie led the band with the piano and vocals. De De lost his vision due to glaucoma in the 1950s around the same time that Billie suffered a stroke, which paralyzed her for several months, putting a temporary hold on their career. Their careers picked up again in the 1960s as Dixieland jazz experienced a revival. She was a regular on the New Orleans jazz scene in the 1950s through the early 1970s, playing in the Preservation Hall Jazz Band.

Pierce died on September 29, 1974, in New Orleans, Louisiana, at the age of 67. Her husband had died the previous November, aged 69.

== Discography ==
With De De Pierce

- Blues and Tonks from the Delta (Riverside, 1961)
- Vocal Blues and Cornet in the Classic Tradition (Riverside, 1961)
- Jazz at Preservation Hall 2 (Atlantic, 1963)
- New Orleans' Billie & De De and Their Preservation Hall Jazz Band (Preservation Hall 1966)
- New Orleans Jazz (Arhoolie, 1971)
- Billie and De De Pierce at Luthjen's (Center, 1976)
- 1960 (G.H.B., 1994)
