= John Brunious =

American jazz musician (1940–2008)

John Brunious Jr. (October 12, 1940 – February 12, 2008) was a jazz trumpeter and a bandleader for the Preservation Hall Jazz Band in New Orleans.

== Biography ==
The family lived in the Seventh Ward neighborhood of New Orleans. His father, John Brunious Sr., played piano and trumpet and transcribed songs such as "Bourbon Street Parade" for Paul Barbarin. His brother, Wendell Brunious, also became a trumpeter. Brunious was influenced by Dizzy Gillespie and played in rhythm and blues bands. He attended St. Augustine High School and served in the military during the Vietnam War. After he returned to New Orleans, he performed in nightclubs with pianist Ellis Marsalis Jr. and drummer James N. Black. He became a member and then leader of the Preservation Hall Jazz Band during the 1980s.

In 2005, Hurricane Katrina drove him from his home in Gentilly and buried his trumpets. While attempting to secure his boat, he was rescued. He moved with his family to Orlando, Florida. He died of a heart attack on February 12, 2008 in Orlando.
