= Young Tuxedo Brass Band =

American brass band

The Young Tuxedo Brass Band is a brass band from New Orleans that was active after World War II.

The Young Tuxedo Brass Band was founded in 1938 by John Casimir. Its name is a nod to the Tuxedo Brass Band of Papa Celestin, an ensemble in New Orleans in the 1910s and 1920s. The ensemble generally held between nine and eleven players, with two trumpets, two trombones, two reeds, a sousaphone or tuba, a snare drum, and a bass drum. Their first record was issued in 1958 on Atlantic Records, and featured Paul Barbarin on drums; other personnel included Andy Anderson and John Brunious on trumpet, Clement Tervalon, Eddie Pierson, and Jim Robinson on trombone, reedists Herman Sherman and Andrew Morgan, Wilbert "Bird" Tillman, sousaphone, and drummer Emile Knox.

In 1963 Wilbert Tilman, the group's founding sousaphonist and Casimir's cousin, took control of the group, but retired later that year due to poor health; Andrew Morgan took over until his death in 1972. Following this Herman Sherman became the group's leader until his death in 1984. During Sherman's tenure, they appeared at the 1976 Smithsonian Folklife Festival to celebrate the bicentennial of the United States in Washington, D.C., and again in 1985 when the Festival featured a program on Louisiana. They appeared at the White House on Father's Day, 1978 for the 25th Anniversary Celebration of the Newport Jazz Festival.

The band recorded with former Beatle Paul McCartney in New Orleans in 1975. In 1983, they recorded Jazz Continues on 504 Records of England which was a sequel to the Atlantic recording Jazz Begins. This featured Herman Sherman, alto sax, Joseph Torregano, tenor sax, Michael White, clarinet, John Simmons, trumpet, Joshua "Jack" Willis, cornet and mellophone; Gregory Stafford, cornet, Lawrence Trotter, snare drum, Charles Barbarin (nephew of the great Paul Barbarin) bass drum; Walter Payton, sousaphone, Lester Caliste and Clement Tervalon, trombones. Herman Sherman and Clement Tervalon were both on the original 1958 recording.

The band has been under the leadership of Gregg Stafford since Sherman's death in 1984 and is one of the last traditional New Orleans Brass Band playing the hymns, dirges, and songs of the brass repertoire.

== Discography ==
- New Orleans Joys (Atlantic, 1958)
- Jazz Continues (504, 1983)
