= Preservation Hall =

Jazz club in the French Quarter of New Orleans, Louisiana, US

Coordinates: 29.9583°N 90.0654°W

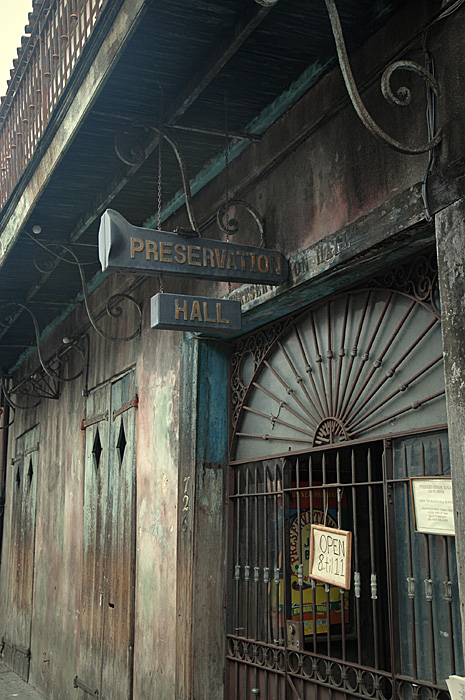
- Interactive map of Preservation Hall
- Address: New Orleans; United States

Construction
- Opened: May 1961

Website
- www.preservationhall.com

Preservation Hall is a jazz venue on St Peter Street in the French Quarter of New Orleans, Louisiana. The building is associated with a house band, a record label, and a non-profit foundation. Preservation Hall receives roughly 180,000 visitors per year.

== History ==
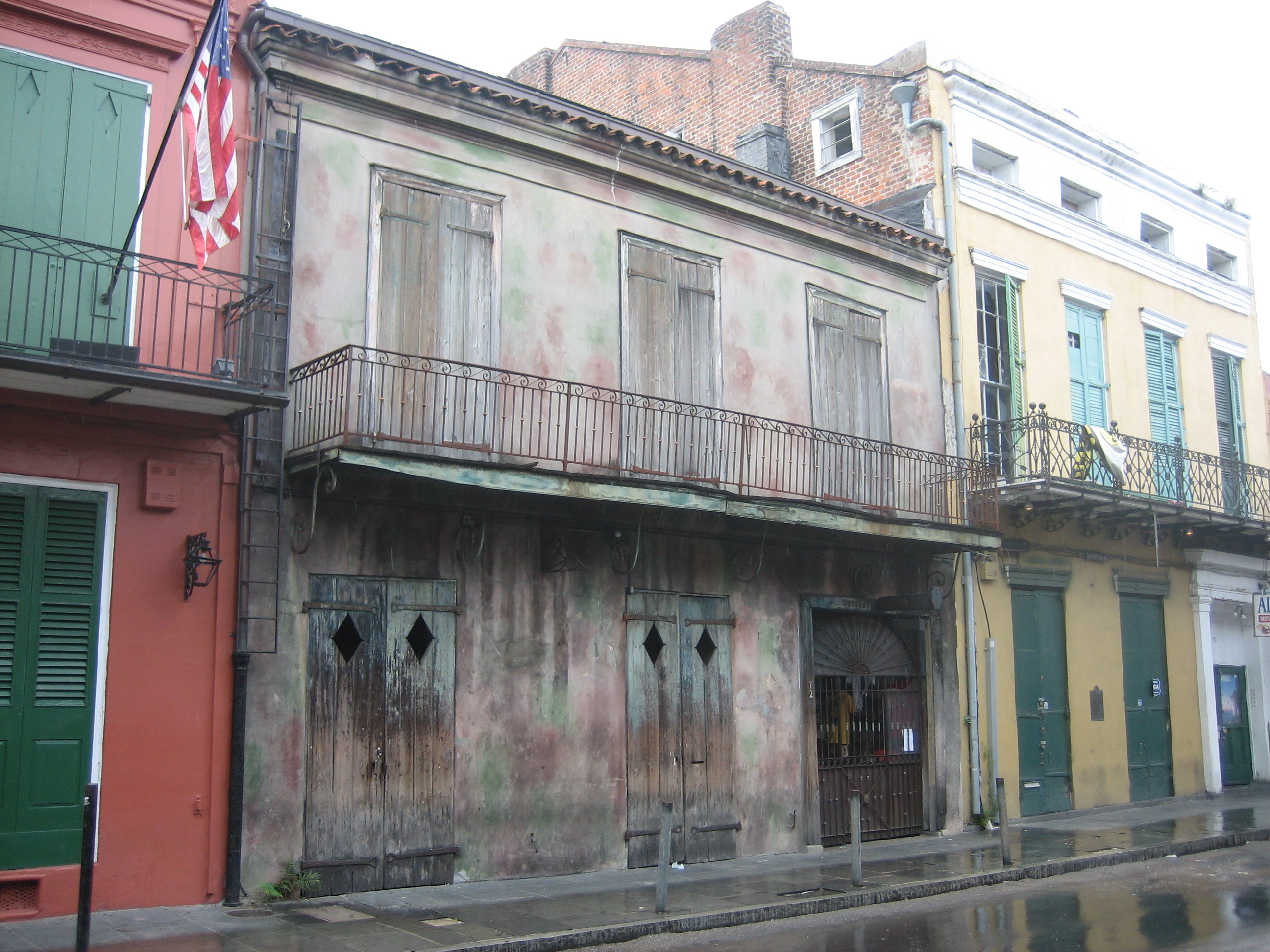

In the 1950s, art dealer Larry Borenstein from Milwaukee managed what would become Preservation Hall in the French Quarter as an art gallery, Associated Artists. To attract customers, he invited local jazz musicians to play for tips. After a time, the music started drawing more attention than the art. In May 1961, Borenstein turned management over to Ken Grayson Mills and Barbara Reid, who turned it into a music venue and named it "Preservation Hall".

After their honeymoon in 1961, Allan Jaffe and his wife Sandra visited to hear some traditional New Orleans jazz. The Jaffes were from Pennsylvania. Allan Jaffe was a tuba player who had graduated from the Wharton School of Business in Philadelphia, while his wife had been employed at an advertising agency. They attended concerts, grew to love the French Quarter, and stayed longer than they had intended. Borenstein asked if they wanted to manage Preservation Hall, and they agreed, taking over in September 1961.

Allan Jaffe hired local musicians whose ages ranged from the 60s to the 90s. Many were struggling with poverty, racism, and illness. At first, the Jaffes served no alcohol, used no amplification, and refused to advertise. In 1963, Allan Jaffe began to tour with bands in the U.S. and in other countries. These tours included such musicians as pianist Sweet Emma Barrett, trumpeter Kid Thomas Valentine, brothers Percy Humphrey and Willie Humphrey, pianist Billie Pierce and her husband, trumpeter De De Pierce. The most popular was clarinetist George Lewis, whose reputation preceded the Hall. Fans from all over the world came to New Orleans to hear traditional jazz.

=== Organization ===
The Preservation Hall Foundation is a 501(c)(3) organization primarily dedicated to Preservation Hall's educational initiatives, including but not limited to providing private lessons to youth taught by New Orleans jazz musicians, coordinating group lessons with the Preservation Hall Junior Jazz Band, presenting workshops during Preservation Hall Jazz Band tours, or maintenance of the ever-growing Preservation Hall archives. The Foundation also provides a free online learning resource for music educators and students called the Preservation Hall Foundation Brass Bandbook including the songs "Bourbon Street Parade", "Just a Closer Walk with Thee", "Lil' Liza Jane", "Down by the Riverside", "Didn't He Ramble", "Lord, Lord, Lord", "I'll Fly Away", "Joe Avery's Piece", "Paul Barbarin's Second Line", "Old Rugged Cross", "By and By", and "Do Whatcha Wanna".
