= Noel Rockmore =

American artist

- 1951 self-portrait, age 21, NYC
- Born: Noel Montgomery Davis; December 15, 1928; New York City, New York, U.S.
- Died: February 19, 1995 (aged 66); Kenner, Louisiana, U.S.
- Education: Art Students League of New York
- Known for: Painter
- Movement: Realism
- Awards: Hallgarten Prize, Tiffany Fellowship, Ford Foundation Award
- Patrons: Joseph Hirshhorn, Vincent Price, George Wein, Jimmy Buffett

Noel Rockmore (December 15, 1928 – February 19, 1995) was born Noel Montgomery Davis to his mother, Gladys Rockmore Davis, and his father, Floyd Davis, in New York City. Rockmore was an American painter, draughtsman, and sculptor. He claimed to have produced more than 15,000 works of art in his lifetime. He is known for his portraits, his early rise to fame, his Preservation Hall portraits, and for changing his name at the height of the popularity he had developed in New York City. He had a daughter, Emilie Rhys.

Noel painted in a realistic and old masters style throughout his childhood and adolescence. He experimented with different artistic theories, techniques, and ideas in the New York art world of the 1950s.

As the abstract expressionist movement gained momentum, Rockmore left New York and went to New Orleans, where he changed his name from Noel Davis to Noel Rockmore, adopting the surname of his mother. He spent the next 20 years commuting between New Orleans and New York City while various dealers tried unsuccessfully to manage him and his often volatile career.

== 1928–47: Early life ==
Noel Davis grew up in New York City, the son of a painter, Gladys Rockmore Davis. His father, Floyd Davis was recognized in 1943 by Life Magazine as illustrator of the year. Noel's younger sister, Deborah Davis, was born in 1930.

== The Art of Noel Rockmore and His daughter Emilie Rhys ==
The Art of Noel Rockmore and Emilie Rhys had its grand opening on January 30, 2020, and was on display through September 1. The late Noel Rockmore and his daughter Emilie Rhys have used their unique vision not only to paint musicians but also to reveal their unique personalities and their ways of approaching and making music. The exhibit will explore music in New Orleans as seen through the artistic eye of Mr. Rockmore in the 1960s and 1970s and Ms. Rhys in the past decade. An exhibit pairs them together for the first time at the Museum which has an extensive collection of early jazz artifacts throughout the building.

Noel began taking violin lessons at the age of 5. He also learned piano and guitar. In 1935, while both he and his sister were struggling with polio, Noel turned to painting as an artistic outlet. He attended Juilliard, where he learned to play violin.

In the early 1940s, while his parents covered World War II as art correspondents for Life magazine, Noel attended Putney School in Vermont, where he graduated in 1947. He also attended the Art Student League of New York with Julian E. Levi.

== 1948–50: Career beginnings ==
In 1948, when Rockmore was 19, Joseph Hirshhorn became his first major patron. He was encouraged by Henry Francis Taylor, director at the Metropolitan Museum and became acquaintanced with Raphael Soyer, John Koch, and Yasuo Kuniyoshi. His first studio was in the Cooper Union Complex in New York City, where he painted the street people of the Bowery.

He painted animals from The Museum of Natural History and in 1950 he painted scenes from the Ringling Brothers Circus. Coney Island, Fire Island, and Central Park. Xavier Gonzalez, Jack Levine, and Fletcher Martin all encouraged Noel Davis to ignore the art fads of the time, including abstract expressionism, and persevere in his own unique direction.

== 1951–58: Married life and career ==
On June 20, 1951, Noel Davis married Elizabeth Hunter in New York City. On their honeymoon in Valles, Mexico, his car hit a cow and was demolished. Upon the couple's return to New York, they settled into the typical life of a young married couple, in the "Des Artistes" building on the West Side.

He began showing his works at the Harry Salpeter Gallery. He did two Life Magazine commissions and was invited to join the National Academy of Design. He was in group exhibitions at the Metropolitan Museum, Whitney Museum, Museum of Modern Art, and The Pennsylvania Academy of Fine Arts. He won the Hallgarten Prize, the Tiffany Fellowship (twice: 1956 and 1963), and The Wallace Truman Prize.

In 1958, Joseph Hirshhorn purchased an additional eight Noel Davis paintings, bringing his total to 16 for the Hirshhorn Museum. He had a one-man show at the Salpeter Gallery in New York and the Butler Institute of American Art in Ohio. Later that year he moved to Brooklyn Heights as his marriage dissolved as well as his relationship with Harry Salpeter. Upon leaving his wife and children, he moved to Coney Island, and then Xavier Gonzalez arranged for him to obtain a studio in the house of New Orleans painter Paul Ninas, where, according to Davis, he could "dwell in creative obscurity".

== 1959–60: Journey to New Orleans ==
While in New Orleans, Noel Davis decided to legally change his name to Noel Rockmore, adopting his mother's maiden name. This caused controversy, as it was unheard of for a major recognized artist to change his name at such a point in his career. He was banned from the Hirshhorn Museum when he was caught there changing his name from Davis to Rockmore on one of his works. He was also accused of defacing a major work at a museum in New York (possibly a Jackson Pollock).

Once in New Orleans, he met E. Lorenz Borenstein, gallery owner, Pre-Columbian artifact dealer, Preservation Hall co-founder, and real-estate entrepreneur. He also met Bill Russell, composer, jazz historian, and New Orleans merchant and they began a lifelong friendship that would be punctuated by Rockmore's depiction of Bill in numerous paintings and watercolors throughout his life. While in New Orleans, Rockmore found a new list of patrons that truly admired his work including Shirley Marvin and the Faubles who would become his patrons for life.

Rockmore spent 1959-1960 painting New Orleans, specifically the French Quarter. Paul Ninas, Rockmore's landlord writes a letter to Salpeter in New York reporting that Rockmore is cavorting with young female companions, wearing western boots and tight jeans, using Castor oil in his hair and drinking for days on end.

== 1961–63: Return to New York ==
Rockmore returned to New York and his arrangement with Harry Salpeter was slowly dissolved. In 1961, he began to exhibit his work with Greer Gallery, which offered him greater exposure.

== 1963–65: New Orleans – Preservation Hall years ==
Upon Rockmore's return to New Orleans, Borenstein had found a young couple, Sandra and Allan Jaffe, who had turned Preservation Hall into a going concern featuring old jazz musicians. Borenstein commissioned Rockmore to document all of these musicians as fast as he can. Rockmore responded with 300 oil portraits and over 500 small acrylics in less than two years. The portraits included the following jazz musicians: Billie and DeDe Pierce, George Lewis, Odetta, Dizzy Gillespie, Jim Robinson, Cie Frazier, Louis Nelson, Punch Miller, Oscar Chicken Henry, Kid Thomas Valentine, Joe Robichaux, Narvin Kimball, Danny Barker, Alcide Pavageau, Kid Sheik Cola, Percy Humphrey, Willie Humphrey, and Emma Barrett (Sweet Emma the Bell Gal) to name a few.

Rockmore worked with a framer, Bruce Brice, whom he mentored and encouraged on his career path, and who eventually became a respected American folk artist. Rockmore, Borenstein and Bill Russell collaborate on a book, Preservation Hall Portraits, which featured Rockmore's works and was published in 1968. After 1965, much to Borenstein's disappointment, Rockmore chose to do new series including shipyards and construction sites.

In 1965, another relationship was formed with Jon and Gypsy Lou Webb, publishers of The Outsider, featuring Charles Bukowski. Their company, Lou-Jon Press published Crucifix in a Death Hand featuring Bukowski's poetry and Rockmore's art.

In 1963, Rockmore created a series of works based on his travels in Mexico, and in 1965, he did the same concerning his travels to Morocco. In 1964, he won a Ford Foundation Award that resulted in a show at the Swope Art Museum in Terre Haute, Indiana, where he was artist-in-residence.

== 1965–69: New York, New Orleans, and San Francisco ==
In late 1966, Rockmore's father Floyd Davis died; shortly thereafter in early 1967, his mother Gladys Rockmore Davis died as well. Rockmore retreated to San Francisco to be with his sister Deborah, painting San Francisco and Haight-Ashbury as well as Eldridge Cleaver, Lawrence Ferlinghetti, and Allen Ginsberg.

In 1967, Luba and Victor Potamkin, a Cadillac dealer from New York, and Sergio Franchi, world-famous tenor, decided that they would manage Rockmore. They arranged for his biggest show ever, set to take place in New York City in November 1967 at Greer Gallery. The big opening was completely shut down by an anti-war riot at the New York Hilton where Dean Rusk was to speak.

In early 1968, Potamkin and Franchi sent Rockmore to Israel to produce a series for his next big show. The works captured much of the tension and anguish in Israel at the time, and a show is held at the Crane Korchin Gallery in PA in May.

Rockmore also painted a portrait of the writer Henry Miller for a Lou-Jon press book which was rejected when the Borenstein negotiation with Lou-Jon goes bad. In early 1969 Rockmore parted ways with Potamkin and Franchi and returned to San Francisco to visit his sister and paint a new series.

== 1969–73: Return to New Orleans and Jazzfest ==
At the end of 1969, Rockmore returned to New Orleans and reunited with Larry Borenstein, who got him a commission from George Wein to create posters for sale to commemorate the very first New Orleans Jazz & Heritage Festival (Jazz Fest). Rockmore was also included by Wein on the inaugural Jazz Fest committee and commissioned to do a watercolor series of the event.

The first two New Orleans Jazz & Heritage Festivals in 1970 and 1971 were held in Louis Armstrong Park, then known as Beauregard Square, in the area of the park known to be the historic Congo Square and the adjoining New Orleans Municipal Auditorium. Artist Noel Rockmore and Bruce Brice did posters for the first New Orleans Jazz & Heritage Festivals in 1970.

At that time, Rockmore began a relationship with folk artist Sister Gertrude Morgan and painted and worked with her throughout 1970. He embraced and painted many famous characters from the French quarter, including Mike Stark and his Free Head Clinic, Ruthie the Duck Girl, the jazz musicians Bill Russell and Gypsy Lou, and his new girlfriend Riva Segall.

In 1971, he was commissioned by Time Magazine to do a cover portrait of then Governor Jimmy Carter, which was rejected as "too realistic" for Time. He was also commissioned by Time to do a portrait of Arial Sharon. In 1971, Rockmore did a Civil War series and a Victorian Scrapbook series where he transported himself back in time in order to paint periods he had researched.

In 1972, Wein commissioned Rockmore to go to Paris and Venice with girlfriend Riva in order to create a series of works for Wein's personal collection. Rockmore and Riva parted ways at the conclusion of the trip and after a brief in New York, Rockmore returned to New Orleans, where he took up with Mickey Cahn for a year. By then, Rockmore was working with Bryant Galleries in New Orleans, having permanently split with Borenstein.

== 1974–77: Final return to New York City ==
In 1974, Rockmore moved back to New York and started a series of large murals throughout the city. McGlade's bar and Café des Artistes became his hangout, as well as a display place for his art. In late 1974, the Lakeview Center for the Arts in Peoria, Illinois, put on the retrospective "The World of Noel Rockmore" with a black and white brochure of major works Rockmore decided he could procure for the show. In 1976, Rockmore had his last New York City show at the Forum Gallery. He took up with a young Andrea Lannin and reunited with two of his children, one of his daughters and his son. In 1977 Rockmore sold his West 67th apartment in New York and left the city for the last time.

== 1977–87: Final return to New Orleans ==
In 1977, Rockmore returned to New Orleans with girlfriend Andrea Lannin, and two of his children, now young adults, came to with him as well. By the end of the year Lannin had moved on and Rockmore had re-engaged himself with Bryant Galleries. He began a series of prints, etchings, and posters, including the famous Muhammad Ali and Leon Spinks Fight Print of 1978 from the Superdome.

While in New Orleans, he also created his well-known Jonestown Triangle painting, which depicts Jim Jones and the Jonestown suicides. He was commissioned by George Wein to do an "Homage to the New Orleans Jazz & Heritage Festival", and also began a five-year intimate relationship with Rita Posselt.

By 1981 he split with Bryant Galleries. He was now represented by the Sandra Zahn Oreck Gallery and had three very successful shows during the next three years that included his "Mardi Gras Backstage series" from the Blaine Kern warehouses. Sandra Zahn Oreck closed the gallery in 1983 and Rockmore chose to seek representation with Bryant Galleries once again.

Bryant Galleries sent Noel and Rita to document Haiti, where he captured the Haitian culture, particularly the Haitian Vodou aspect. By the end of 1983, Noel and Rita had separated. In 1984, Rockmore first came into the possession of a puppy that he named Remby, who would be with him until right before his death in 1995. He began work on fantastic vodou pieces, sculptures, and three-dimensional collages.

In late 1984 Rockmore took up with a local entrepreneur, William May, originally from LaGrange, Georgia, who would attempt to manage Rockmore back to New York for a big show. William May sequestered Rockmore away in a house in Mill Valley, California, and supplied him with canvas, paint, materials, and money to live on. May was unable to procure the New York show and had to settle for the Chattahoochee Valley Art Association of LaGrange.

Rockmore, now 56, returned to New Orleans. One of his painting from the Mill Valley series was purchased by Jimmy Buffett, who attributes his song "Bring Back the Magic", reaching #24 on the charts, to Rockmore's painting. By late 1985 Noel was represented by the Posselt-Baker gallery of New Orleans.

In 1986–87, Rockmore was frustrated by his lack of recognition and funds. His drinking escalated and his relationship with women started to deteriorate. Nevertheless, his work output continued with the creation of several new series including the Caesarian series, French Quarter pastels, and a new Grid series inspired by football betting cards. He attended Alcoholics Anonymous and worked hard to reconcile his relationship with Mary May, but by the end of 1987 she had gone and Rockmore was once again alone and without a gallery.

== 1988–95: The final chapter ==
In 1988, Rockmore signed a deal with Bryant Gallery in order to get a regular paycheck; while with Bryant, he was befriended by Dr. Hava, a psychiatrist and drinking buddy from Johnny White's, his favorite watering hole in the French Quarter. Dr. Hava put Rockmore on Zoloft in the hopes of allowing him to regain his focus and control his behavior. It seemed to work. Rockmore began to exercise, working out at the YMCA; his new-found motivation allowed him to move forward and produce an entirely new "Ancient Egyptian" series in 1990. In 1991, he had a well-received Egyptian show at Bryant Galleries.

In 1991 his longtime patron Shirley Marvin had the professional documentary Rockmore produced in New Orleans, featuring Rockmore and narrated by his daughter. In 1992 he began work on an "immigration series" featuring Ellis Island but was hospitalized that summer with an intestinal disorder. While hospitalized, he underwent detoxification from alcohol; he was able to remain sober for a month and half after being released. He completed the "immigration series" and had his final exhibition at Bryant Galleries at the age of 64.

In 1993 he began a dramatic series of huge works and collages to detail his march towards death. By late 1994 he was quite ill. He created his "final" self-portrait. He refused to go to the hospital despite attempts by his friends to intervene. He chose instead to go to the home of his friend Dr. Hava, whom he depicted as Dr. Jack Kevorkian in one of his final works.

On Friday February 17, 1995, the day Rockmore was to lose his life, an open house was scheduled at Dr. Hava's but did not occur. Rockmore was put in a cab, and the cabbie was told by the doctor that Rockmore was a street person to be dropped off at St. Jude Medical Center in Kenner, Louisiana. According to the admitting nurse, as recorded in a letter to Rockmore's sister, as Rockmore was put on the gurney to be admitted to the hospital, he heard that he was thought to be a street person, and he raised himself up and said, "I am not a street person, I am a great artist." Noel Rockmore lost consciousness and died, two days later, on February 19, 1995, at the age of 66. His body was donated to medical science.

== Posthumous recognition ==
In 1998, a retrospective was held at the New Orleans Museum of Art (NOMA), sponsored by Shirley Marvin, Preservation Hall, and NOMA. The show "Noel Rockmore: Fantasies and Realities" was presented by curator Gail Fiegenbaum and included a brochure and panel discussion with George Wein, Shirley Marvin and Rita Posselt.

In November 2006, one year after Hurricane Katrina, Rich and Tee Marvin, Shirley's son and daughter-in-law, discovered more than 1,400 Rockmore works in Shirley Marvin's storage facility in New Orleans. They also found 35 years' worth of correspondence, every Rockmore brochure and news article, as well as a documentary film all related to the life of Noel Rockmore.
