= Sherwood Studio Building =

Apartment building in Manhattan, New York

- Sherwood Studio Building seen about 1940 (Note: The date of 1940 is estimated from the model year of the taxicabs.)
- Interactive map of the Sherwood Studio Building area

General information
- Status: Demolished
- Type: Residential apartments
- Location: Manhattan, New York, United States
- Coordinates: 40.7641°N 73.9771°W
- Construction started: 1879
- Opened: 1880
- Destroyed: 1960

Technical details
- Floor count: 7
- Floor area: 9,500 sq ft (880 m^{2})
- Lifts/elevators: 1

Design and construction
- Architect: John H. Sherwood

The Sherwood Studio Building was an artists' apartment building at 58 West 57th Street, at the southeast corner with Sixth Avenue (Avenue of the Americas) in Midtown Manhattan, New York City. The building was constructed in 1879 as artists' apartments. It was demolished in 1960 to permit the construction of a large apartment building called Hemisphere House.

It differed from the other studio buildings of its time in its extent and in the amenities it offered. It was taller than most, with great floor-to-ceiling windows, many of which gathered northern light across an unusually broad street. In addition to spacious studios, its apartments contained bedrooms, bathrooms, and reception rooms. Each apartment had central heating, gas light, and, for internal communication, electric bells and speaking tubes. The building's elevator was large enough to fit oversize works of art. There was an exhibition hall that could also be used for receptions and parties. An on-site café-restaurant helped to compensate for the building's lack of kitchenettes and became popular for the social interaction it enabled as well as the meals it provided.

In its early years, the building adjoined the homes of prosperous art collectors and a later transformation brought luxury shops and tony cultural institutions as its neighbors. With all these advantages, "the Sherwood", as it came to be called, succeeded in attracting artists who were comfortably well off, whether because they had already established successful careers or because they benefited from inherited wealth. Moreover, its location and amenities made it particularly attractive to single women and small families.

== History of the site ==
Such men as Coleman and Church, extracted a conditional promise from me years ago that I would plan and build an establishment coming within the means of artists in this country, who have, by the way, to be content with smaller prices than their brethren in Europe, but are, nevertheless, in the receipt of sufficient incomes to live comfortably, even elegantly, in quarters suited to their professional and personal requirements. — John H. Sherman speaking to a reporter in May 1879.

The Sherwood Studio Building was located in the southeast corner of 57th Street where it meets Sixth Avenue. 57th Street was designated by the Commissioners' Plan of 1811 that established the Manhattan street grid as one of 15 east-west streets that would be 100 ft (30 m) in width (while other streets were designated as 60 ft (18 m) in width). Following the plan, the street was laid out and opened in 1857. However, more than a decade later, the block of the street between Fifth and Sixth Avenues was still mostly undeveloped and noted for its boulders and deep ravines where squatters lived in shanties. That changed in the mid-1870s when wealthy New Yorkers began to put up large family residences on the block. William B. Bishop, a banker and stockbroker, built one of the first, a brownstone at number 10. Others soon followed. (Note: An 1876 directory gives addresses on the block for bankers John Ellis and John S. Kennedy; merchants John Auchincloss, Richard R. Haines, Caleb Marsh, and James Talcot; importer Sigmund Housman; lawyers Frederick W. Stevens and Stephen Benton Elkins; manufacturer Henry T. Sloane; and politicians Edwin Einstein and Samuel B. H. Vance.) At that time, the block's best-known residents were two branches of the Roosevelt family, one headed by James A. Roosevelt and the other by Theodore Roosevelt Sr. (the latter being the father of President Theodore Roosevelt). A directory of 1881 adds the names of other prominent citizens including merchant Augustus D. Juilliard, financier William Bayard Cutting, and banker Jacob Schiff. The intersection of 57th Street and Fifth Avenue was further developed in 1879 with the construction of the Cornelius Vanderbilt II House at the northwest corner. One contemporary observer described the block's family homes as "first-class dwelling houses". Another called them "the brown-stone mansions of rich brewers, the François Premier chateaux of bankers, the Gothic palaces of railroad kings". (Note: The history of some of these buildings, including photographs, can be found in posts by Tom Miller in his weblog Daytonian in Manhattan.)

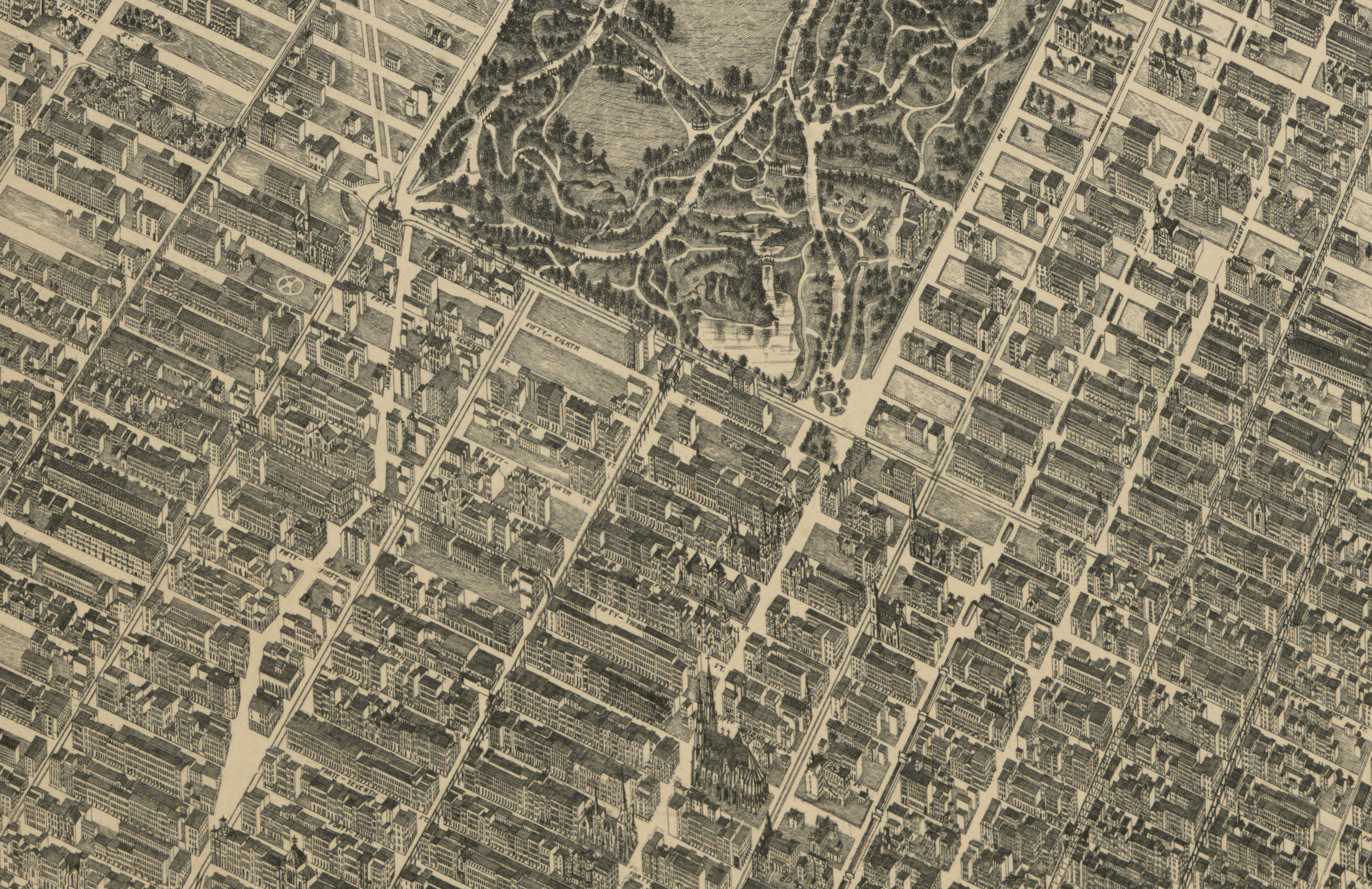
(1) Detail from an 1879 perspective map of midtown Manhattan by Will L. Taylor for Galt & Hoy, printers

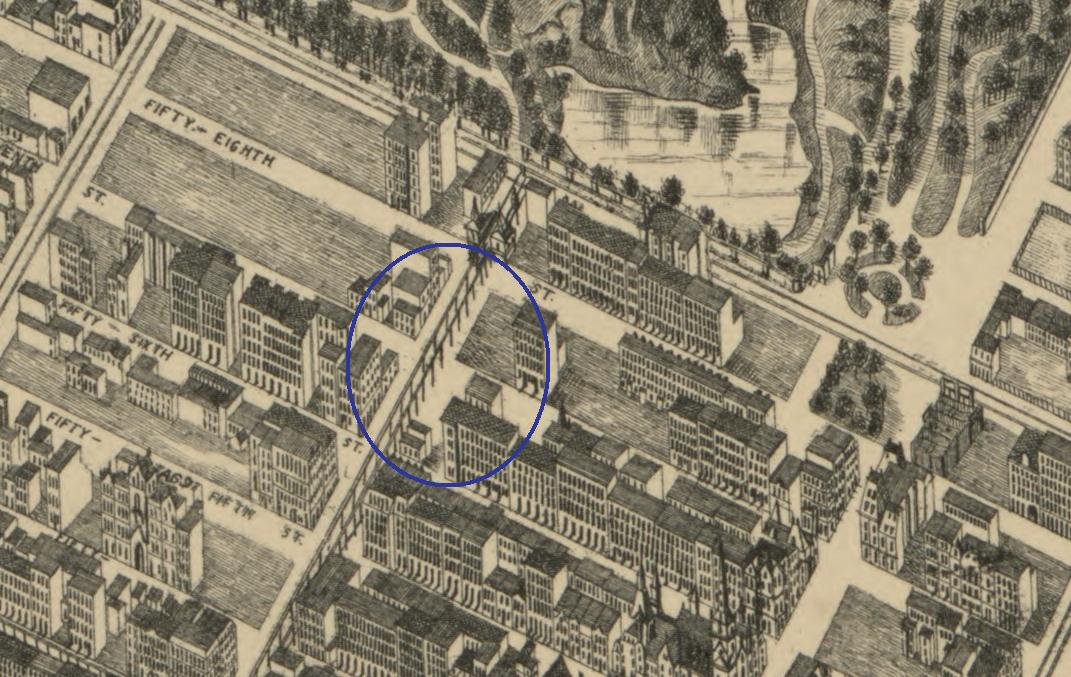
(2) Detail from an 1879 perspective map of midtown Manhattan showing the location of the Sherwood Studio Building

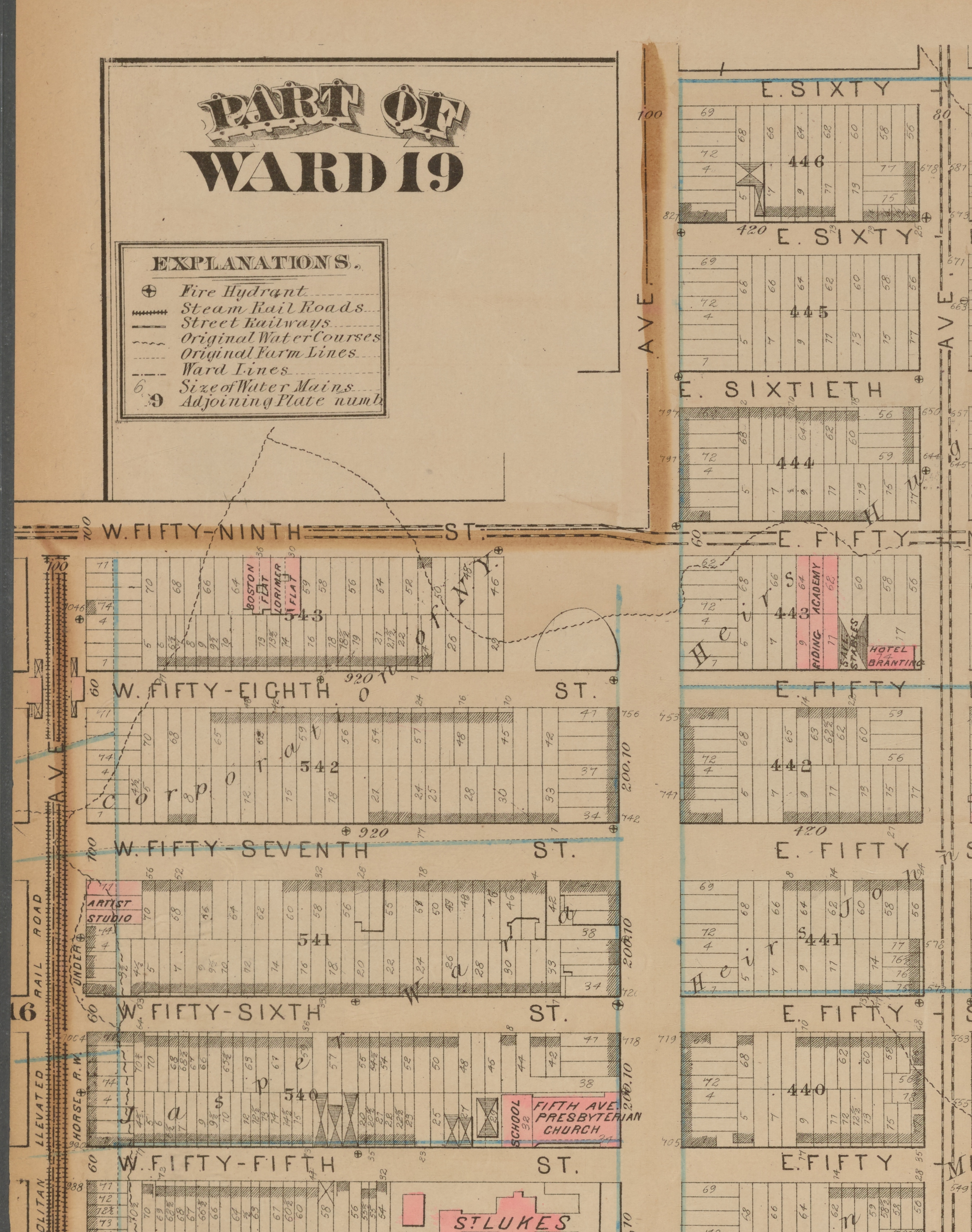
(3) Detail from Plate 19 of the Atlas of the Entire City of New York, (New York, G.W. Bromley & Co., 1879) showing part of Ward 19 below Central Park

57th Street between Fifth and Sixth Avenues is shown in an 1879 perspective map that gives a bird's-eye view of Manhattan in a period just prior to the construction of the Sherwood Studio Building. The detail view of this map (marked as image 1) is centered on the building's location in Midtown Manhattan. The detail view (image 2) is further enlarged to show the empty lots (circled in blue) where it would be constructed. In this view, you can see an apartment building across the street (occupying lots 49 to 53) and a number of vacant lots. The late 19th-century street atlases of New York, like (image 3), reveal the lots occupied by the Sherwood, labeled "Artist Studio", amid the area's other lots, many of them empty and others, as indicated by gray shading, having standing buildings. Most of these lots measure a uniform 25 ft (7.6 m) wide by 100 ft (30 m) deep. The use of these lot dimensions was a real estate practice that had begun during colonial times and continued to be effective into the 20th century.

When the Sherwood Studio Building was developed, many lots in the area measured 25 by 100 ft (7.6 by 30.5 m), a real estate practice that had begun during colonial times. Vacant lots could be bought and sold individually or in contiguous groups of two, three, or four. Representative sales in the 1870s show lots on 57th Street between Fifth and Sixth Avenues selling for about $25,000 each. In 1871, a man named William Sloan paid $88,000 to Frederick Hornby to purchase the four lots on which the Sherwood Studio Building would be constructed. A year later, Sloan sold the lots to Gardner G. Yevelin for $115,000. In 1874, the man who designed and constructed the building bought them from Yevelin for $130,000. Sloan, Hornby, and Yevelin were all men who bought and sold real estate in New York.

== Decision to build ==
The man who bought the four lots was John H. Sherwood (1816-1887). At the age of 40, Sherwood had begun buying and selling city real estate. He succeeded to such an extent that, at the time of his death in 1887, his property was estimated to be worth US$2 million, an amount roughly equivalent to $72,000,000 in 2025, according to calculations based on the consumer price index measure of inflation. As his wealth grew, Sherwood expanded his interests to include insurance, banking, and political activism. He also acquired a large collection of paintings many of which he had commissioned from the artists who made them. Like other American art patrons of his time, he bought paintings by established European artists, but, unlike them, he also bought from young and relatively impecunious American artists, including John Singer Sargent and Winslow Homer. Works by Sargent in his collection included the highly-regarded painting, "In the Luxembourg Gardens", of 1879 and works by Homer included the famous "Snap the Whip" of 1872. Sherwood had supported his great-nephew, Carroll Beckwith, when he arrived in New York from Chicago in 1871 and had soon become acquainted with William Merritt Chase along with Sargent and Homer and others of Beckwith's artist friends.

As well as trading in real estate lots, Sherwood designed and constructed buildings. In an 1879 interview about the design and construction of the Sherwood Studio Building, he said that "such men as Coleman and Church" had convinced him to undertake the project, meaning the artists Charles Caryl Coleman and Frederic Edwin Church. His aim, as he put it, was to "plan and build an establishment coming within the means of artists in this country, who have, by the way, to be content with smaller prices than their brethren in Europe, but are, nevertheless, in the receipt of sufficient incomes to live comfortably, even elegantly, in quarters suited to their professional and personal requirements". He hoped his artist tenants would form a "sort of exclusive colony" to which none would be admitted who were "likely to prove offensive members of the general body politic".

== Construction and early years ==
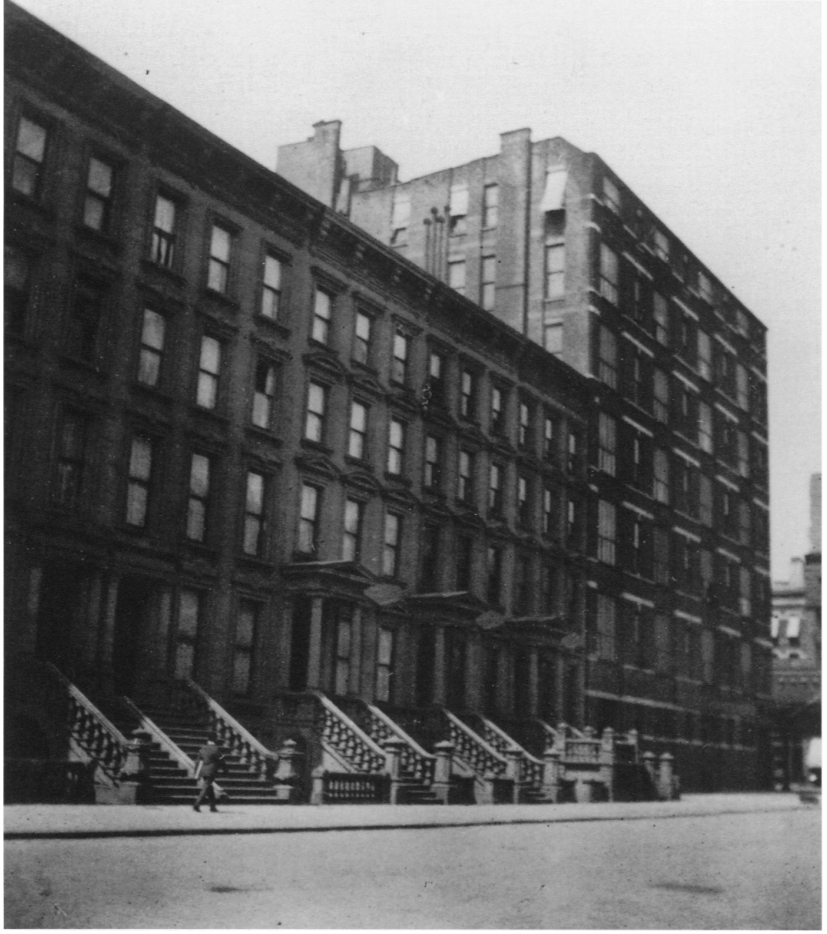
Photograph taken in 1902 or 1903 showing the south side of 57th Street at the corner of Sixth Avenue in Manhattan

During the late 1870s, real estate construction experienced dramatic growth as the recovery from the Panic of 1873 as financial confidence increased and low-interest loans became more readily available while at the same time the cost of labor and materials remained relatively low. Over a period of some 12 months between 1879 and 1880, Sherwood was able to construct the building at a cost, in cash, of about $260,000. Some months after it was completed he took out a mortgage of $150,000 and a few years later borrowed another $50,000. When he began accepting tenants, the building's design was not far from the plans he had outlined to a reporter at the outset. The structure was seven stories high and almost exactly a square (100 ft (30 m) on Sixth Avenue and 95 ft (29 m) on 57th Street. Considered by a contemporary to have a plain facade with "no extraneous ornament", its exterior walls were made of red brick accompanied by stone and iron elements. The ground floor was devoted to shops. Above that, each floor had floor-to-ceiling windows and the top floor had skylights as well. The apartments facing 57th Street were expected to be the most desirable having both northern exposure and extra light resulting from the avenue's extra width. The building's apartments had high ceilings and an extra-large elevator to accommodate large canvases or pieces of sculpture. They possessed conveniences that were not widely available at the time including hot and cold water, electric bells, speaking tubes, gas (for illumination), and central heating. There was also a restaurant for tenants' use. When it opened in the Spring of 1880, the building was said to dominate all the houses in its vicinity. Writing in 1910, an observer said the building looked "almost as fresh as when it was erected, its precise lines testifying to an exceptional thoroughness of construction".

The studios, with their great windows, were the largest rooms. Between them and a central hallway were reception rooms, one or two bedrooms, and bathrooms, all of them windowless. There were initially no provisions for cooking, however, some apartments were modified in later decades to include kitchenettes and, at least in one case, a full kitchen.

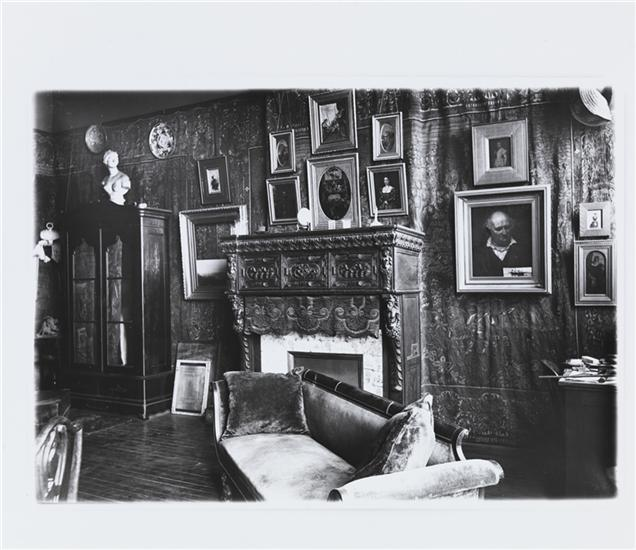
(4) Studio of Albert H. Baldwin in the Sherwood Studio Building, about 1893

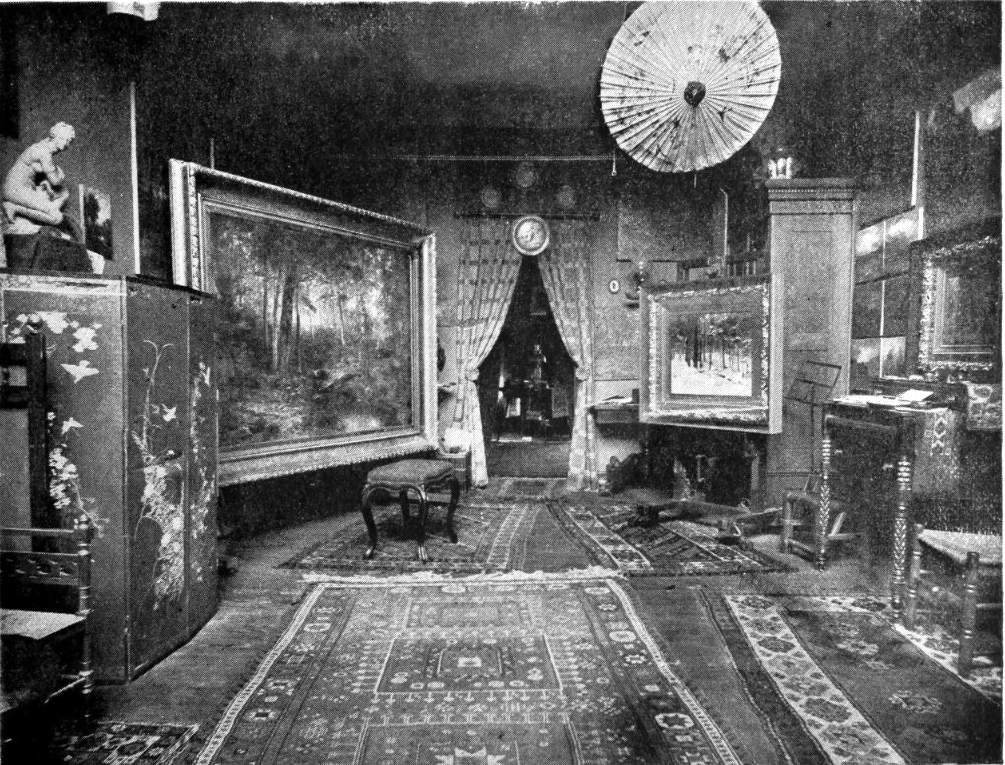
(5) Studio of Roswell Morse Shurtleff in the Sherwood Studio Building, 1895

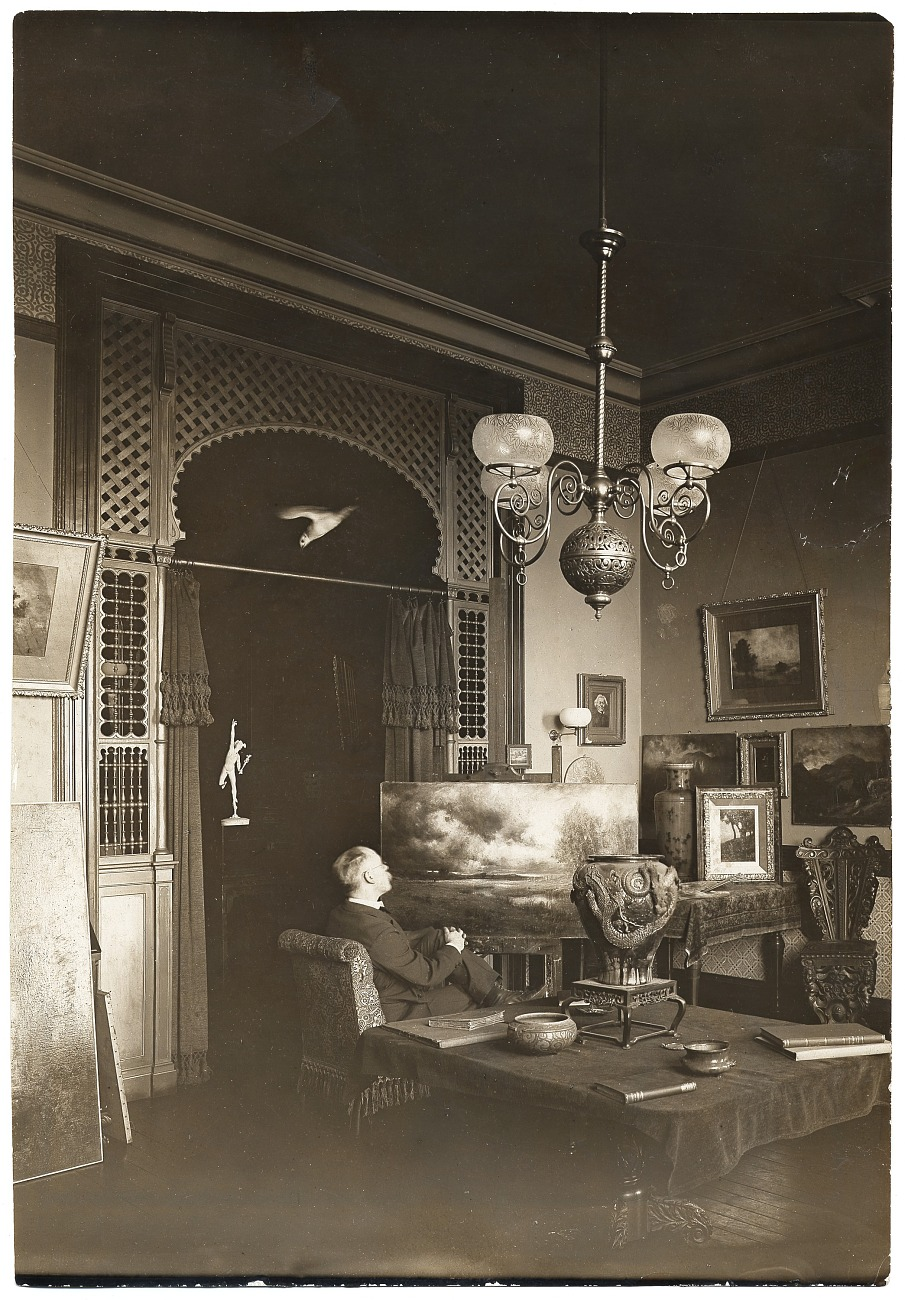
(6) Robert Crannell Minor, shown in his studio in the Sherwood Studio Building, about 1900

The studio of Albert H. Baldwin (image 4) shows the fireplace that supplemented the building's central heat. The studio of Roswell Morse Shurtlef (image 5) gives an idea of the room's size. This photo also shows the doorway leading to the adjoining reception room. The studio of Robert Crannell Minor (image 6) shows the room's high ceiling and gas lighting. These photos are illuminated by natural light coming from behind the camera through the building's large windows. (In the Shurtleff photo, the natural light is supplemented by gaslight coming from behind the parasol.)

Leases were required of all tenants. Rents varied by size and location of apartments—higher for corner apartments, apartments facing 57th Street, and apartments on upper floors. The combination of studio and residence in one apartment, including private bathroom, was particularly attractive to women artists and small families. By 1883, the building was fully tenanted and demand persisted sufficiently for rents to be regularly raised. By 1910, it had fulfilled Sherwood's purpose in designing and constructing it. As one man who knew the place well wrote, it had by then become a "hive of studios where much has been produced that has proved illustrious in American art for three decades past". In 1892, the building was deemed New York's "uptown headquarters of Art". So many of its tenants had been students together that a social gathering could feel, one said, like a "reunion of old friends". In succeeding decades, the building would also attract a growing number of non-artists who appreciated the artistic ambiance and found the large studio rooms ideal for entertaining guests.

At a time when there were few commercial art galleries and when those few did not routinely show American art, New York artists adopted the practice of opening their studios to draw in prospective customers. Sherwood artists coordinated with each other, opening their studios to the public, generally on Thursdays and Saturdays, in hopes of generating sales. They sent out hundreds of invitations and drew so many visitors that at least on one occasion they had to announce that "only those persons who have received cards of invitation will be expected". Regarding one reception, Carroll Beckwith recorded in his diary the attendance of "crowds of swell people", adding that his studio was "jammed". In 1910, the British artist, Robert J. Wickenden, recalled a visit to a Sherwood reception: "Among my early recollections of the Sherwood Studios was the attending of a reception held simultaneously by all the artists in the building during the winter of 1880-81; ... [O]n the top floor, amid a number of brilliant portraits, and some fresh studies from Velasquez, James Carroll Beckwith, more widely known as "Carroll Beckwith", received his numerous friends among the artists and students, with such leaders of New York City as were interested in the then newer movement in American art".

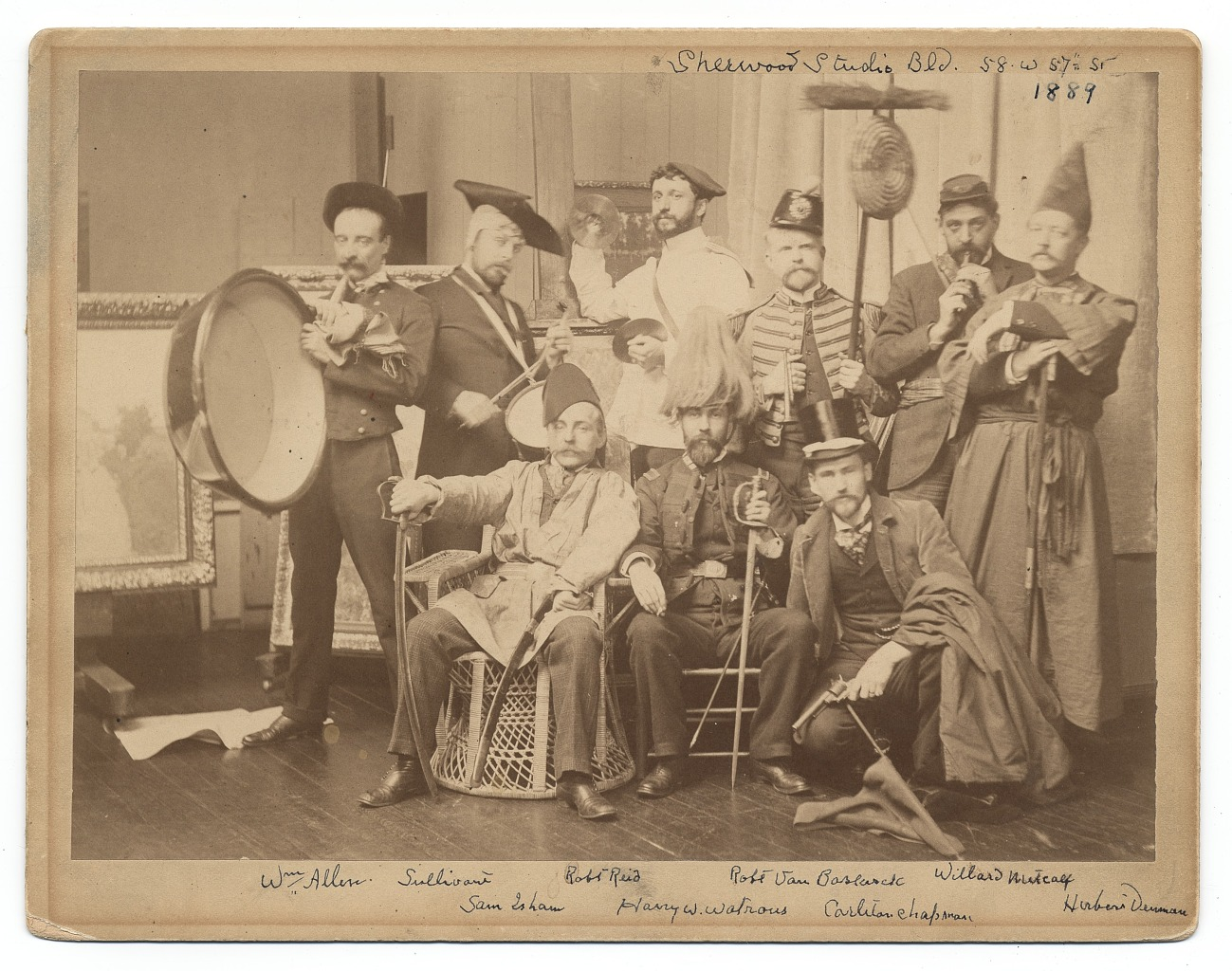
Artists at a costume party in the Sherwood Studio Building, 1889, Shown, left to right, are William S. Allen, T. S. Sullivant, Samuel Isham, Robert Reid, Harry Watrous, Robert Ward Van Boskerck, Carlton T. Chapman, Willard Metcalf, and Herbert Denman.

The artist tenants of the Sherwood Studio Building soon became known for the parties they gave. An 1889 photo showed artist tenants at a costume party held in one of the studios. A year later, an artist caused a minor sensation when he arranged for the Spanish dancer known as Carmencita to perform at a party in his studio, and a few years after that the same artist hosted an "infants party" that required all guests to come dressed as children. Invitations to these high jinks were said to be avidly sought after as opportunities for non-artists to glimpse a "rarefied Bohemia". The building's invitation-only social events figured in popular literature. In a 1903 short story, a young lady asks a gentleman friend to escort her to an "artists' frolic" saying she is determined to "do something desperate". It does not matter that her aunt will be completely shocked because, she says, "I am simply crazy for an evening of careless, happy-go-lucky fun".

Artists would also hold late-night parties on the spur of the moment, including, according to one investigator, "dances, card games, concerts, or boozy salons". Evening meals in the restaurant were social occasions as well. Originally located just above the ground floor, the restaurant was moved down to the rear of two stores that faced Sixth Avenue in 1881. In 1910, a gossip columnist said the restaurant was the place to meet the "painting gang". "They are nearly all of a kind", he wrote, "and as a rule exhibit at the Academy". In his journal, one tenant recalled that "there is little occasion for a club; we sit at table each night a party". Artists were expected to treat their table companions to wine when they made a sale.

The artist tenants did not voice complaints about the building in the local press, however, Carroll Beckwith did use his diary to record that Sherwood antagonized all the workers he employed, "grinding them down to the last cent". Beckwith also alleged that Sherwood would buy a painting from a tenant and then raise the rent by the amount of the purchase.

Noting Sherwood's financial success in constructing and fully tenanting the studio building on 57th Street, other builders put up even more lavish establishments and their success, in turn, resulted in a gradual loss of the building's standing as the premier location for those artists who could afford the rents. Nonetheless, demand for the apartments remained strong during the succeeding decades before its demolition. It simply became a quieter place for artists to live and work in.

== New owners to 1909 ==
In 1887, Sherwood died, leaving most of his estate, including the building, to his wife and daughter. As its new owners, they proved to be no less conscientious in managing it than he had been. In 1890, mother and daughter sued the owners of the Sixth Avenue elevated railway that ran beside the building's west side, claiming that the railway's noise and the debris it produced depressed their rental income. Back in 1877, an article in The New York Times had judged that train running on elevated tracks and giving frequent service from Lower Manhattan up to Central Park was the city's "most pressing want". During that year and the next, the Gilbert Elevated Railway Company constructed and opened the Sixth Avenue Line; it proved to be a commercial success, drawing as many passengers as could fill its cars. Throughout most of the day, trains of four or five cars were drawn by light steam locomotives and tenders. However, the line also drew criticism from owners, tenants, and some of the merchants in buildings that lay adjacent to its route. During its first few months of operation, all the trains serving Sixth Avenue ran on the tracks outside the west side of the building, but in 1879, new tracks connecting the Sixth Avenue Line with the Ninth Avenue Line left the northern section of the line between 50th and 58th Streets as a spur, having much-reduced service by single-car shuttles. Despite the reduction in service and attendant reduction in noise, smoke, and debris, the owners of the Sherwood Studio Building were successful in their suit against the owners of the railway for loss of income resulting from the line. In 1924, the spur was removed, leaving an open avenue outside the Studio Building.

== Subsequent owners, 1909 and later ==
In 1909, the Sherwood family sold the building to one of the ground-floor commercial tenants, Harry J. Luce, then president of a grocery chain called Acker, Merrall & Condit which rented the Sherwood's corner store. In 1913, one of the city's few female hotel owners and real estate speculators, Jennie K. Stafford, acquired the building in a trade worth $750,000. Stafford had begun her career by inheritance on the death of her husband, Robert Stafford. She subsequently pursued it by herself while her two sons were growing to maturity and then served as president of a family firm when they came of age. In 1916, a news account said she was "known in the hotel world as one of the most capable managers in the country and among real estate operators as one who has made a fortune in her tradings."

In 1921, a realty company controlled by William Randolph Hearst bought the building in a deal valued at $1,000,000. Hearst's real estate dealings were influenced by Arthur Brisbane, whose career paralleled Hearst's in newspaper and property operations. Brisbane had begun his news career in 1882 as a reporter for the New York Sun and, since John H. Sherwood had helped found the Sun and served for many years on the newspaper's board of directors, it is reasonably likely that at the beginning of Brisbane's career the two men had become acquainted with one another.

== Transitions, 1920 to 1960 ==
Following World War I, the block of 57th Street between Fifth and Sixth Avenue transitioned from residential to commercial as speculators bought and transformed the block's mansions into upscale retail establishments. A real estate specialist was quoted in 1922 as saying 57th was "the greatest street in New York". As the transformation to fashionable shopping district proceeded, reporters began referring to the block as "Rue de la Paix of New York" or "the Rue de la Paix of America". By 1937 the Sherwood, then one of the oldest buildings in the vicinity, was considered to be a local landmark. Its local prominence gradually dwindled, however, and some two decades later the building had fallen into disrepair.

In 1943, the Andros Realty Corporation bought up the property fronting Sixth Avenue to the south of the Sherwood and in 1944 filed a building plan for a large apartment house with a footprint covering almost the entire block from 56th to 57th Street. After years of persistent offers, Andros was finally successful in buying the Sherwood in 1960 for $4,132,240. He promptly announced the construction of a 19-story building of close to 250 apartments and penthouse suites. The completed structure was opened in 1963 and quickly rented all its units.

At the time it was demolished, the studio building was one of the last of its kind still standing, a circumstance that was deplored by the artists who were forced to move out. A long-time resident told a reporter that the lofts that some artists had begun using in parts of the city were not an appropriate alternative to studio apartment buildings like the Sherwood for women artists and artists with families.

== Long-standing tenants ==
Although long-term tenancies rarely made the news, quite a few artists lived and worked in the building for relatively long periods. For example, the portraitist, Jessie Voss Lewis, had been living there for 15 years by the time she was interviewed in 1935. Another woman, Margery Ryerson, lived there from 1924 to 1960 and a third, Ilse Bischoff, lived there for about 25 years beginning in 1930. Sherwood's great-nephew, Carroll Beckwith, was one of the building's first artist tenants. Having moved in before the building's formal opening in 1879, he continued to rent for three decades until his departure in 1910. The painter, Robert Van Boskerck, was another early tenant. He lived in the building for at least 38 years, from some time before 1894 until 1932. A news report in 1941 said that another painter, Carle J. Blenner, had by then become a minor celebrity in the building, having lived there 50 years. He died in New Haven in 1952 and it is not known when he moved out.

=== Acker, Merrall & Condit ===
In March 1880, a shop owned by Acker, Merrall & Condit became the building's first commercial tenant. The company took a ten-year lease of the corner store and its basement for $6,250 a year. With an 80 ft (24 m) frontage on 57th Street and a 60 ft (18 m) frontage on Sixth Avenue, the store was the largest as well as the choicest location on the building's ground floor. Established in 1820, Acker, Merrall & Condit was a well-known and successful grocery chain. The firm operated a wholesale business as well as retail stores and specialized, as an article in the New York Times stated, "in the finest grades of fancy groceries, both imported and domestic, as well as wines, liquors, and cigars." The shop's commercial prominence may be indicated by the use of the firm's name to designate the whole building in a real estate atlas of 1885. Despite the negative impact of U.S. Prohibition on its wine and spirits business, the company prospered in the 1920s. The continuing value of the 57th Street location is indicated by the $40,000 the firm paid for lease renewal in 1925. However, neither the company nor its shop in the Sherwood Studio Building could survive the Great Depression. In 1932, Acker, Morrell & Condit declared bankruptcy and in 1933, the court-appointed receiver sold the shop and all of the company's other assets. The Romanoff Caviar company purchased its goodwill, including the name, and the original business ceased to exist. (Note: After reorganization, shops selling wine and spirits continued in business using the name Acker, Merrall & Condit. The company resumed specialty grocery operations in 1944 and, in the 21st century, it has become an international wine sales organization consisting of retail stores, an online auction house, and corporate business services.)

== Some artist residents ==
It was a wonderful building, because models walked up and down the aisle, knocked on the door, asked if you wanted a model. So, you were never short of models— Black, Chinese, Japanese, White, everything. It was wonderful. -- Ilse Bischoff in an oral history interview, January 1982.

When it opened and for the first few decades of its existence, the Sherwood Studio Building attracted as its tenants those relatively mature New York artists whose careers had flourished during the last third of the 19th century. Many of the men in this group had met each other in Paris when, in common with many other American artists of the period, they sought to increase the sophistication of their work by exposure to European Beaux-Arts influences. The prices they received for their paintings and sculptures were generally lower than the prices paid for the work of established European artists, but they were nonetheless sufficient for them to live comfortably. Although many of the men and women who lived in the building were widely collected in their time, however, few retained substantial reputations into the 21st century.

Examples of late 19th century residents who were once popular include John Henry Dolph (1835–1903), known for landscapes and pictures of pet dogs and kittens; Adolfo Müller-Ury (1862–1947), known for portraits and still lifes; Francis Coates Jones (1857–1932), known for floral, figure, and mural painting; and Ralph Albert Blakelock (1847–1919), known for landscapes and portraits. May Wilson Preston (1873–1949), an illustrator and painter of figures and landscapes, is an example of an artist who lived in the building during the first two decades of the 20th century. During the 1920s, Floyd MacMillan Davis (1896–1966), an illustrator, and his wife, Gladys Rockmore Davis (1901–1967), a figure, landscape, and portrait painter. Ilse Bischoff (1901–1990), illustrator, printmaker, and painter, lived there in the 1930s. (Note: These examples all come from the AskArt database of artist biographies and auction records.) A few residents who continue to be well known in the 21st century include Robert Henri, Al Hirschfeld, and Augustus Saint-Gaudens The building's women artists were also generally well known during their lives but have not retained their reputations into the 21st century. Of the many women artists who took up tenancies during the early years, these few stand as examples: Eleanor Greatorex (from 1880), Helen Corson Hovenden (from 1882), Cecile de Wentworth (from 1883), Rhoda Holmes Nicholls (from 1884), Maria Matilda Brooks (from 1887), and Maria a'Becket (from 1888). A relatively comprehensive list of early tenants is given as an appendix to an article that appeared in the Archives of American Art Journal in 1996.
