= Ilse Bischoff =

American painter

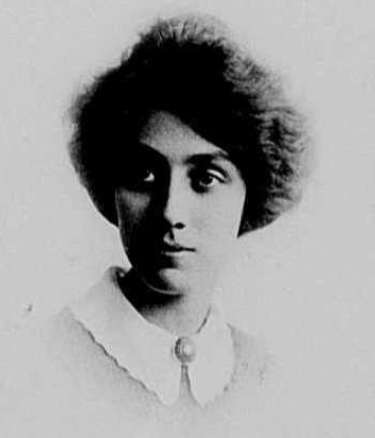
- Ilse Bischoff, U.S. passport photo taken in 1922
- Born: Ilse Martha Bischoff; November 21, 1901; Manhattan, New York
- Died: December 6, 1990 (aged 89); Hartland, Vermont
- Known for: Artist, printmaker, author, illustrator

Ilse Bischoff (1901–1990) was an American artist, book illustrator, and author. Best known for her skill in woodblock printing, she also painted in oils and casein and made graphite drawings. She remained firmly committed to representational art throughout her life, choosing human figures for her main subjects during most of career and turning toward still lifes toward the end. She illustrated many books, including two of which she was author. Family wealth allowed her to pursue the multiple facets of her career free of worries about critical reception or the income that her work would bring her. She nonetheless welcomed both the praise that was given to her art and writings and the tangible rewards they earned her.

She received art training in New York City and Munich, traveled extensively in Europe for most of her life, and maintained studios at her homes in New York and Vermont. At the beginning of her career she won the top prize in the first annual exhibition of American block prints held by the Philadelphia Print Club, a book she wrote mid-career won a reviewer's unqualified praise, and, late in her career, the director of an art center praised her "forthright choice of natural subjects" and said her work conveyed "the beauty, wit and charm of factual reality".

== Early life and education ==
Bischoff was born on November 21, 1901, in New York City. As a child she loved to draw and, as she grew older, her mother encouraged this interest. From kindergarten through twelfth grade she attended the Horace Mann School, a liberal co-educational component of Columbia Teachers College located on the campus of the university. The art director at Horace Mann, Belle Boas, helped Bischoff develop her interest in art into a creative skill. Boas and fellow teacher, Lucia Williams Dement, taught using an innovative method that aimed, as they wrote, "toward individuality of expression". They had pupils work from nature rather than copying famous artists and, when viewing famous works of art, saw the development of their pupils' "critical judgment" as a main goal. They summarized their approach in a 1917 publication describing Horace Mann's curriculum, writing, "The work must grow upward from the child's point of view rather than downward from the adult's, thereby keeping the fearless, naïve, childlike interest and expression toward which the conventional adult mind usually looks back as upon a lost Eden". (Note: Boas later wrote an influential text on art education: Belle Boas, Art in the School (1924, New York, Doubleday, Doran, & Co.)) Although the family's wealth ensured that Bischoff would not need to earn a living, her mother encouraged her to attend a school where she could learn a useful trade. After graduating from Horace Mann in 1919, she consequently enrolled in the New York School of Applied Design for Women where she received good applied-arts training in how to make meticulously accurate drawings of flowers. In 1920, she enrolled in the Parsons School of Design (then known as the New York School of Fine and Applied Art) where she primarily studied costume design. Then, having realized that she would prefer to work in the fine arts, she enrolled in the Art Students League where she learned illustration and painting from Frank DuMond and etching and lithography from Joseph Pennell.

Bischoff's parents were both German-American and the family spoke German in their home when she was young. She later said English was effectively her second language as a child. Her fluency in German gave her an advantage when, beginning in 1922, she began to make regular trips to Germany and other European countries to study art. Apart from the years of World War II, she visited Europe almost every year. (Note: For example, scanned images of ships' manifests available on FamilySearch and Ancestry show that she returned to New York from Europe in 1922, 1923, 1924, 1926, 1928, 1930, 1931, 1934, 1935, 1936, 1938 (three times).) Her longest period of foreign travel came in about 1927-1928 when she interrupted her training at the Art Students League to study privately in Munich under the German portraitist and printmaker, Georg Buchner (1858–1914). After returning from Munich, Bischoff completed her education at the Art Students League.

== Career in art ==
Ilse Bischoff, Homeward Bound, woodblock print, shown in The Philadelphia Inquirer, February 13, 1927

While studying in Munich, Bischoff had learned now to make woodblock prints and in 1927 won top prize in the first annual exhibition of American block prints held by the Philadelphia Print Club. Her prize-winning print, "Homeward Bound", can be seen at left. Describing its subject as "two peasant women, bowed beneath the weight of heavily laden baskets on their backs, who are proceeding wearily along a road", a critic for The Philadelphia Inquirer praised its "fascinating conception". A year later, Bischoff showed block prints and drawings with watercolor washes in a solo exhibition at the Ferargil Galleries in New York. She had made her first book illustrations the previous year and included some of the woodcuts from that work in the exhibition. A critic for The New York Times called the prints "effective" and the drawings "amusing". In 1929, the Philadelphia Print Club gave her a solo exhibition that contained some of what a critic called her "celebrated block prints" displaying "modern in feeling and execution and in mood embody both sombreness and humor". The following year, John Sloan selected a piece by Bischoff for the "Fifty Prints of the Year" touring exhibition sponsored by the American Institute of Graphic Arts. Writing in Parnassus, Gertrude A. Rothschild said Bischoff's block print showed "fine restraint" in portraying "the sensation-hungry faces at a bullfight". In that year she also showed at the Philadelphia Print Club's fourth annual Block Print Exhibition including pictures of Spanish subjects that a critic praised as especially brilliant.

Ilse Bischoff, The Funeral—Soviet Russia, 1930, woodblock print, 8 1/4 × 9 7/16 inches

In 1930, Bischoff rented a spacious artist's studio and apartment in the Sherwood Studio Building on West 57th Street in Manhattan. (Note: First occupied in 1880 and torn down in 1960, the Sherwood Studio Building contained forty-five three- and four-bedroom suites. The common floor plan was a large studio with floor-to-ceiling windows, a reception room, and one or two bedrooms. Bischoff called it a "wonderful building". She said a diverse collection artists' models would roam the halls offering their services.) That year, she showed prints in the Philadelphia Print Club's second annual exhibition. Reviewing the show, C.H. Bonte said two of them, "At the Fair-Sevilla" and "Gypsy Dancers". were "Spanish transcriptions of effulgence, the disposition of the dancers being especially notable". Throughout the 1930s, Bischoff continued to show in exhibitions of block prints assembled by the Philadelphia Print Club for the Brooklyn Museum. Reviewing the 1931 show, a critic said Bischoff's "Funeral in Soviet Russia 1930" from this show "might well be timeless in its representing of Slavic peasant grief". This print is shown at right. During these years, she also participated in group shows at the Salons of America (1934), the National Academy (1945), the Pennsylvania Academy of Fine Arts (1937), and the Whitney Museum of American Art (1937).

In 1942, when the war prevented her from spending summers in Europe, she bought a house in Hartland, Vermont, and began spending May to October in it. She did not immerse herself in country life, however, but continued to see herself as a visitor from Manhattan.

Ilse Bischoff, Harlem Loge, about 1934, oil on canvas, 46 × 50 1/16 inches

At the second annual Portrait of America exhibition in New York, held in 1945, Bischoff's painting, "Harlem Loge", won a $500 award Made about 1934, the painting depicts African-American patrons in box seats at the Alhambra Theater in Harlem. It toured the country during the late 1930s in an exhibition of 32 paintings assembled by the Pennsylvania Academy of Fine Arts and sponsored by the American Federation of Arts. This painting is shown at left. Although the figures it shows seem to be caricatures, it received positive critical attention as well as the prize. Critics saw it as humorous, dramatic, or powerful. Calling it one of the most striking works in the show, a critic said it was "subtle and rich" and praised the composition as "exceptionally well handled". Bischoff retained the painting and, in 1948, gave it to the gallery of Dartmouth College, located a few miles from her summer home in Hartland. Dartmouth exhibited her works from 1947 until the end of her career, including 1947 (solo), 1949 (solo), 1954 (group of three), 1955 (solo), 1961 (group), 1966 (retrospective), and 1986 (solo).

A solo exhibition of her work at the Southern Vermont Arts Center in 1968 provoked a disagreement among local critics. Writing in the Rutland Daily Herald on July 10, Tom Slayton said the paintings she showed were "technically superb" but conveyed "synthetic emotion". He complained that a portrait called "Mary" was a patronizing depiction of a "good Negro" that lacked "real life". A week later, James L. Montague, head of the Southern Vermont Arts Center, wrote a letter to the editor of the Daily Herald in which he quoted the head of the Dartmouth art department in rebuttal to Slayton. The quote praised Bischoff's "skillful, precise drawing, her delicate, sure coloring, and her forthright choice of natural subjects" and said her work conveyed "the beauty, wit and charm of factual reality". On July 19, writing in the Bennington Banner, Jerome Wichelns called her paintings "stereotyped and imitative and very much wanting in originality". He complained that Bischoff seemed to him to shy away from abstraction "into some kind of confused representative realism".

Throughout her career, Bischoff was ruthless in destroying work that she thought to be inferior. In an oral history interview, held late in her life, she said, "I've had wonderful cleanings out of my studios when I've gone like a whirlwind through things and torn them up, put them in the fire. I always feel cleansed afterward". She did not actively court critics and collectors. In the same interview, she said, "I like people to like my paintings if I think they know something or just have simply good taste, but I never craved publicity. I liked it when I got it, but I didn't go out for it".

Bischoff died at her summer home in Vermont on December 5, 1990.

=== Artistic style ===
There's so much pleasure in drawing. That's why I don't understand some of these abstractions. Why, if they look at an apple, for instance, why do they want to abstract the truth from that object? ... Cézanne certainly was marvelous. He did his own fruit in his own way, but he didn't abstract the truth.

— Ilse Bischoff, Oral history interview with Ilse Bischoff, 1982 (Archives of American Art, Smithsonian Institution)

Ilse Bischoff, Standing Female Nude, 1950, graphite on paper, 17 × 14 inches

Throughout most of her career, Bischoff chose mainly human figures as subjects. Her 1950 drawing of a standing female nude is shown at right. She had high regard for great portraitists like Albrecht Dürer and John Singer Sargent as guides but did not place great value on her skill at capturing a human likeness. As she began to spend more time working at her summer place in Vermont, she turned more to still lifes, there not being human models available to her there. Committed to her own version of realism from an early date, she did not become aware of pure abstraction until well into her career and once she had encountered it, she rejected it as a style. She said she "liked the little niche" she had created for herself and "went right on working in it".

Ilse Bischoff, Still Life: Fungus, 1957, casein on Whatman's illustration board toned gray by artist, 16 15/16 × 21 15/16 inches

She worked in oils until about 1955 when, at the suggestion of her friend, Paul Cadmus, she began to work in casein. Late in life, she said that, unlike most artists, she adopted an increasingly controlled, meticulous style during the course of her career, whereas they, as she saw it, became freer as they aged. The still life of a fungus, shown at left, is an example of her work in this style.

== Career as illustrator ==
Although Bischoff was primarily known as a book illustrator throughout virtually all of her career, contemporary sources give only indirect information on the origins and progress of her work in that field. In 1927, the year she began exhibiting her art, her first book illustrations appeared in a children's book called Marty Lou's Treasure by Mary Dickerson Donahey (Garden City, N.Y., Doubleday, Page & Co.). The following year, woodcuts she had made appeared in a book of Albanian folk tales: Tricks of Women, & Other Albanian tales translated by Paul Fenimore Cooper (New York, W. Morrow & Company). Five books appeared in 1930 with her woodcuts or drawings: Temptation of St. Antony translated by Cyrus Brooks (New York, I. Washburn), Hansel the Gander by Katharine Kuebler (New York, W. Morrow & Co.), Street of the Islands by Stark Young (New York, C. Scribner's Sons), Carl and Anna by Leonhard Frank (New York, G.P. Putnam's Sons), The Night Before Christmas by Clement C. Moore (New York, Holiday House).

She continued to contribute illustrations for books during the 1930s, including Gay Madelon by Ethel Calvert Phillips (New York, Houghton Mifflin Co., 1931), Katrina Grows Up by Helen Eggleston Haskell (New York, E.P. Dutton & Co., 1932), Bird Began to Sing by Rachel Field (New York, W. Morrow & Co., 1932), Old Man Daantje's Beard by Leonard Roggeveen, translated by David C. De Jong (New York, Appleton-Century Co., 1933), and In Calico and Crinoline by Eleanor Maria Sickels (New York, Viking Press, 1935). (Note: These citations come via searches of the WorldCat database the book catalog of the Library of Congress, both on April 5, 2021.)

Two books, Nursery rhymes of New York City by Louis How (New York, The Harbor Press, 1931) and Regional Rhymes of New York City by Louis How (New York, Harbor Press, 1937), won awards from the American Institute of Graphic Arts. In printing them, the publisher printed Bischoff's engravings directly from her woodblocks using four colors. A reviewer said that in the second of them she had "expressed perfectly the gayety of spirit that animated the author in immortalizing some seventy-eight places surrounding the village of Manhattan." A reviewer gave a qualified appreciation Bischoff's illustrations in a book published in 1934—You Can't Pet a Possum by Arna Bontemps (New York, William Morrow & Co.)—saying "Although the faces in Ilse Bischoff's illustrations are unnecessarily caricatured, the drawings on the whole have an undeniable charm and humor" and a reviewer of a 1939 book—Peter Peppercorn by Ethel Calvert Phillips (Boston, Houghton Mifflin)—was forthrightly critical, writing, "Ilse Bischoff's drawings, which are inclined to burlesque the scenes and characters they portray, seem out of key". In contrast, Little Grey Gown by Mabel Leigh Hunt (New York, Frederick A. Stokes Co.. 1939) was given a positive reception. A reviewer wrote, "This is a lovely little book to read and to handle, of a distinguished size and shape, and decorated with Ilse Bischoff's sensitive drawings". Bischoff, herself, said she did not regard these efforts very highly. She made an exception to this tepid point of view in discussing one of the last books for which she supplied illustrations. In 1982 she said her favorite illustrated book was Gigi; the Story of a Merry-go-round Horse, by Elizabeth Foster (Boston, Houghton Mifflin, 1943).

Ilse Bischoff, illustration from Childcraft, volume 1 of 14 (Chicago, Field Enterprises, 1949)

Books containing Bischoff's illustrations in the immediate postwar years include Super-market secret by Emilie Vinall (New York, T. Y. Crowell Co., 1945) and Reuben and His Red Wheelbarrow by Alice Dalgliesh (New York, Grosset & Dunlap, 1946). A newspaper reproduced one of her illustrations in its review of the 1949 edition of a fourteen-volume encyclopedia, Childcraft (Chicago, Field Enterprises) saying, "The spirit of heraldry and chivalry characteristic of the Middle Ages is vividly expressed in this drawing by Ilse Bischoff". This illustration is shown at right.

== Career as author ==
Ilse Bischoff, illustration from The Wonderful Poodle, 1943, ink and wash on paper, 12 1/8 × 11 3/4 inches

In the late 1940s, Bischoff took a course in creative writing taught by Mabel Robinson at Columbia University. She said writing came easily to her but felt she did not have it in her to write literary fiction. She recalled thinking that, as she later said, she "didn't have anything to say in a novel". Her one effort at fictionalized biography, Proud heritage (New York, Coward-McCann, 1949), did not please her and received mixed reviews. She herself said the book was "awful". However, both the reviewers and she personally liked two other books she wrote, one a children's story and the other a memoir. The Wonderful poodle (New York, T. Y. Crowell Co., 1949) received a lengthy review in The New York Times that concluded, "It all adds up to a story full of tenderness and humor. Miss Bischoff's illustrations present the staid splendor of the castle and the robustiousness of peasant life with equal grace". A reviewer for the Chicago Tribune summarized the plot and wrote, "The story, although not especially original, will appeal to youngsters for its loving boy-dog relationship. And the author's illustrations, highly stylized, are truly distinguished'. A reviewer for the Louisville Courier-Journal said, "the illustrations give color, intensity and more meaning to the tale of one little Hungarian Prince Rudolf and his remarkable poodle. Almost any question brought up by the locale of the story is answered so clearly for the child in pictures and the tale is told with such a quality of warmth and feeling that any child will get a rich experience in human emotions from it". An illustration from page 20 of the book is shown at left.

Bischoff's best-known book is Drive Slowly—Six Dogs (New York, Viking Press, 1953) which was given a glowing review in The New York Times by the author, Charles Jackson, who wrote, "This is a splendid book, gay, moving, ribald, sad, gallant, tender and wonderfully well written". He said the book unconsciously portrayed Bischoff "as a woman of uncommon good sense, an excellent sense of humor and a rare appreciation of the joy of living". He added a belief that the book was a better-written dog story than the one he had previously considered to be the best: Thomas Mann's A Man and His Dog (New York, Knopf, 1930), originally published as Herr und Hund (Berlin, S. Fischer, 1919) and also appearing as Bashan and I (London, W. Collins & Co, 1923).

In 1965, Bischoff published two articles in the Russian Review. The first on Élisabeth Vigée Le Brun and the second on Étienne Maurice Falconet, both 18th-century French artists who worked in Imperial Russia. She said she had wanted to publish a full biography of Vigée Le Brun but could not find enough information about her life and wrote the article instead.

== Personal life and family ==
Bischoff was born on November 21, 1901, in New York City. Her birth name was Ilse Martha Bischoff. Her father, Ernst Bischoff (1864–1935), was a German-born chemist who founded and directed a pharmaceutical business called the Ernst Bischoff Company, Inc. Her mother was Adele Timme Bischoff (1872–1931), daughter of a German-American textile manufacturer in New York.

Having grown up speaking German with her parents and siblings and having traveled extensively in Europe throughout her life, Bischoff later came to believe that she missed out on the immersion in American culture that was common among the artists with whom she associated. Still, for all the affection she felt for Munich and Paris, she said she loved New York City best. Responding to an oral history question in 1982, she said, "Oh, I loved New York. I loved New York till the day I left. I adored it. Absolute New Yorker".

Bishoff had a younger brother, Edward Timme Bischoff (1909-1940). He was president of the Ernst Bischoff Company as well as a yachtsman and owner of a boatyard in Essex, Connecticut. Bischoff had an older sister, Carola Bischoff (1899–1984). Carola Bischoff married Ernst Carl Otto Friedrich von Duisburg (1884–about 1945) in 1929 and divorced him in 1932. In 1934 she married Harold Graves Terwilliger (1888–1976) and remained married to him until his death. Von Duisburg was owner of large agricultural estates in what was then Vilgelow, Germany, and is now Wielogłowy, Poland. Terwilliger, who was a business executive at the time of their marriage, who became president of the Ernst Bischoff Company after the death of Bischoff's brother, Edward. In addition of making his son the Bischoff company's president, Ernst Bischoff had put his children, once grown to adulthood, on the firm's board of directors.

Bischoff never married. Late in life, she said she felt very much alone in the early 1930s after her parents had died. Nonetheless, she led an active social life. She enjoyed her membership in a private club for professional women (the Cosmopolitan Club) but disliked committee work and, partly for that reason, did not participate in artists' organizations. In the 1940s, Bischoff and her sister began buying fine porcelain pieces by Meissen and Nymphenburg mainly from German refugees in America. Eventually each of them amassed substantial collections. For many years, Bischoff divided her time between an apartment overlooking the East River on the 16th and 17th floors of a building on the Upper East Side of Manhattan and a brick house in Hartland, Vermont.

She died on December 6, 1990, at her home in Hartland, Vermont. (Note: Bischoff's agent said she died of Parkinson's disease. Her death certificate lists heart disease and says the fracture of her right hip contributed to her death.)
