= Larry Borenstein =

New Orleans art dealer and early founder of Preservation Hall

E. Lorenz "Larry" Borenstein
- Born: 1919; Milwaukee, Wisconsin
- Died: 1981 (aged 61–62); New Orleans, Louisiana
- Education: Marquette University
- Known for: Early founder of Preservation Hall

E. Lorenz "Larry" Borenstein (1919–1981) was an American property owner, art dealer and the "Father of Preservation Hall".

He was born in Milwaukee, Wisconsin to Ashkenazi Jewish parents. At 13 years old he went to Chicago to join the World's Fair. After the fair he toured with a carnival for a while. By the age of 18, in the Summer of '37, he was peddling magazine subscriptions in Oklahoma and Texas clearing about $15,000 in 9 months. He put himself through Marquette University majoring in philosophy and working for the Milwaukee Sentinel. He was working for the American Vacation Association when he first arrived in New Orleans on the night of the attack on Pearl Harbor, December 7, 1941. His boss advised him that the war would not last more than a few months and to stick around and make some contacts. Borenstein never left.

Before he died in 1981, he owned several buildings in the French Quarter, had created the market for Pre-Columbian art in the United States by smuggling it from Mexico, and promoted little known artists into famous artists, such as Noel Rockmore as well as Sister Gertrude Morgan, who has been featured in the Smithsonian.

External images
- Photographs related to Larry Borenstein
- Photograph of Borenstein, from Flickr

As the "Father of Preservation Hall", in 1955 he turned his art gallery into a "rehearsal hall" for local musicians in his efforts to preserve the music. Before it took its formal shape, the space was called the New Orleans Society for the Preservation of Traditional Jazz. By 1961, his gallery had morphed into today's Preservation Hall. The Larry Borenstein Art Collection features artists from this era.
