= The Outsider (magazine) =

The Outsider was a 1960s literary magazine published by Loujon Press. "The Outsider" brought the work of Charles Bukowski to national attention, in addition to publishing work by such notable writers as Jack Kerouac and Lawrence Ferlinghetti, along with artwork by Noel Rockmore.

== Overview ==
The Outsider was started in 1961. The founding company was Loujon Press, which was the product of Jon Edgar Webb and his wife Gypsy Lou Webb. In addition to The Outsider, Loujon published two books each by Charles Bukowski and Henry Miller. The Bukowski books were the poet's first major publications.

For the first issue of The Outsider, the Webbs painstakingly printed each page of every copy individually on an archaic hand-press in their French Quarter New Orleans apartment; later three issues were printed on a slightly less outdated 19th century clamshell press.

An image of Gypsy Lou appeared on the cover of every issue, sometimes as the sole subject, other times as a secondary figure (for example the third issue had Bukowski as the main figure on the cover, celebrating him as "the Outsider of the Year"). After publishing a total four issues The Outsider ceased publication in June 1969.

In 2007 a documentary, The Outsiders of New Orleans: Loujon Press, was filmed in which Gypsy Lou Webb told the story of how she and her husband Jon Webb published The Outsider.

== References and resources ==
- Burdeau, Cain. "'Gypsy Lou' Webb's Story is one of Love and Books in Bohemian New Orleans." Associated Press. August 8, 2008.
- Ewing, Wayne. The Outsiders of New Orleans: Loujon Press (Wayne Ewing Films, 2007).
- Weddle, Jeff. "The Loujon Press, Henry Miller and Charles Bukowski." Publishing History 58: 2005, pp 79–109.
- Weddle, Jeff. Bohemian New Orleans: The Story of the Outsider and Loujon Press (University Press of Mississippi, 2007).
