= Floyd MacMillan Davis =

American painter and illustrator (1896–1966)

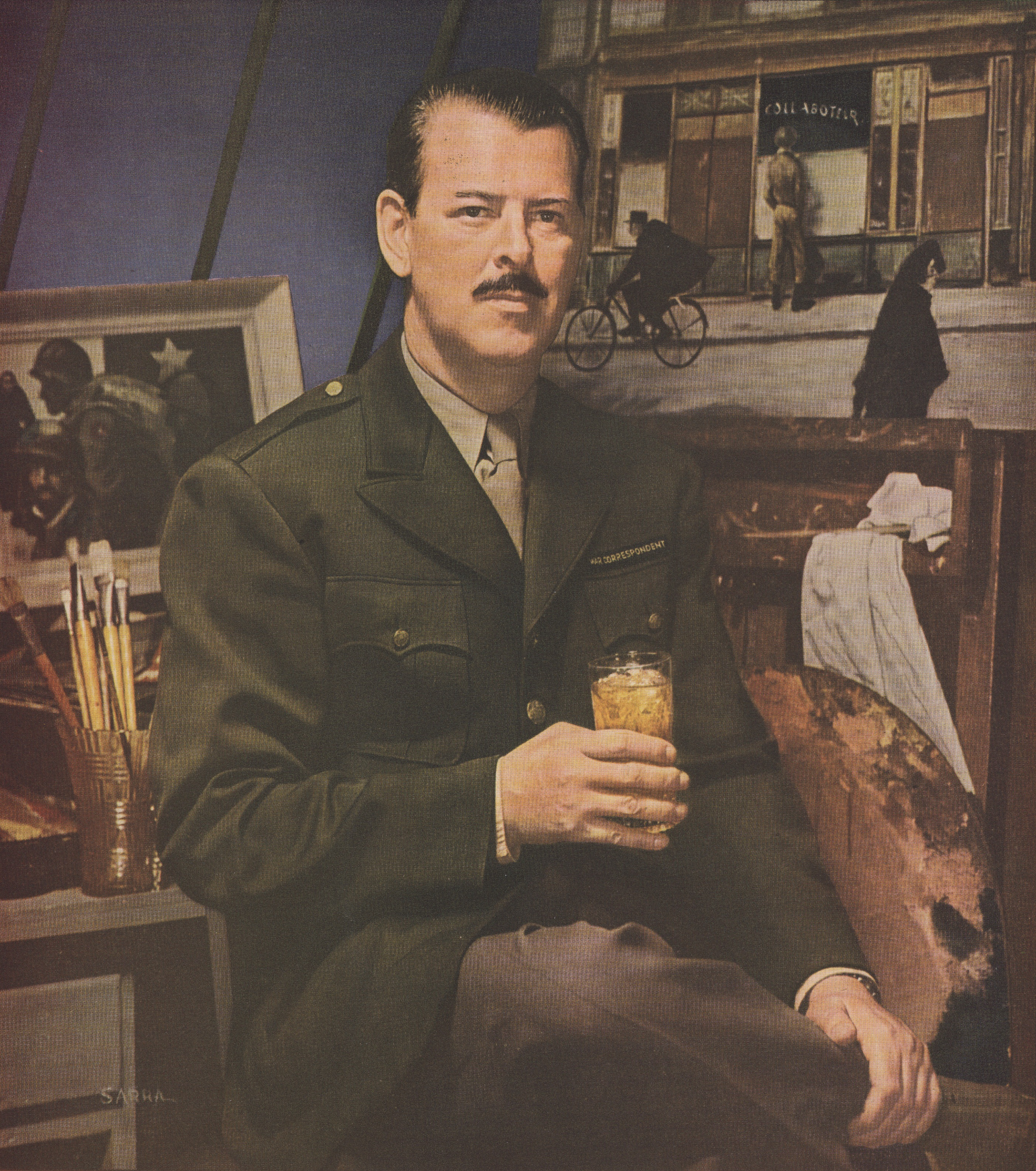
- Floyd Davis – 1946 Lord Calvert Ad
- Born: Floyd MacMillan Davis; April 8, 1896; Chicago, Illinois, U.S.
- Died: October 25, 1966 (aged 70); New York, New York, U.S.
- Known for: Painter Illustrator
- Spouse: Gladys Rockmore Davis

Floyd MacMillan Davis (April 8, 1896 – October 25, 1966) was an American painter and illustrator known for his work in advertising and illustration; Walter and Roger Reed described him as "someone who could capture the rich, beautiful people of the 1920s: dashing, mustachioed men; the cool, svelte women. But Davis was just as capable at capturing just-plain-folk, and with a cartoonist's sensibilities and a fresh humor, he expanded into story art and ad work that called characters of every persuasion.

By the early 1940s, he was recognized as the top man in both fields. In 1943, Life magazine called him the "#1 Illustrator in America".

== Early career and marriage (1896–1925) ==
Floyd MacMillan Davis was born on April 8, 1896, and grew up in Chicago. His ancestors were Scottish and Welsh. Floyd never had the benefit of art school instruction because he was forced by circumstance to quit high school at the end of his first year, after which, he got a job in a lithograph house in Chicago. For $3.00 a week he made tusche and did every kind of manual work entrusted to an apprentice. He was brought into contact with art and was given some opportunity to develop his own drawing skill. His first real art job was with Meyer Both & Co., the well-known Chicago Art Service.

His art career, interrupted by two and a half years of service in the U.S. Navy during World War I, was resumed when he returned to Chicago and joined the Grauman Brothers' organization as an advertising artist. An early exponent of the drybrush technique, he had broken away before 1920 from the usual pen-and-ink drawings. His illustrations appeared in many magazines, including Collier's, The Saturday Evening Post and Redbook.

Davis's early career was almost derailed by love. He returned from World War I duty to work at Grauman Brothers, Chicago. When a woman artist was hired, Davis was so distracted, that the woman had to be let go. The woman was Gladys Rockmore, and she and Davis were married in 1925.

== Advertising and illustration (1926–1941) ==
He had left the studio and was now a freelance advertising artist. The following year, the couple moved to New York City where Floyd, dividing his time between advertising and magazine illustration, soon became the top man in both fields. Then, art editors had to compete with art directors of advertising agencies for his drawings. He became an accomplished illustrator for magazines like Woman's Home Companion, American Magazine, and a long run at the Saturday Evening Post. He did advertisements for most of the major ad firms with clients like Texaco, Johnnie Walker, Eveready, Desoto, Real Silk, Nabisco, Grape Nuts, Caterpillar Inc. and Hiram Walker.

Floyd and Gladys moved to New York City and set up house-keeping in the old Sherwood Studios. On December 15, 1928, and February 1, 1930, respectively, Noel Montgomery Davis and Deborah Davis, their son and daughter made their appearance.

In 1932 (at the height of the Great Depression), they decided to go abroad for a year to Cannes, France, near a Renoir enclave.

In the thirties, Davis began to illustrate stories of humbler subjects. His pictures of southern rural and hill people for such authors as William Faulkner, Sigman Byrd, Glenn Allan, and MacKinlay Kantor became immensely popular. He loved these assignments and filled the pictures not only with a fascinating cast of individuals, but added the special Davis touches: a cat crouched in the corner ready to leap out at a rival, a fly on an old mans heat, a small lizard hiding behind a tree. None of these details intruded on the picture story itself they are there for the perceptive viewer to discover. Readers responded enthusiastically; his pictures were admired as much as the stories themselves.

The family moved in a social milieu which included luminaries in all the arts such as Ernest Hemingway, Dr. Thomas Mann, George Gershwin, Leonard Bernstein, and the puppeteer Bil Baird. They lived at 1 West 67th Street, known as the Hotel Des Artistes, later home of the famous Café des Artistes, where other artists such as Stuart Davis, Leopold Seyffert and LeRoy Neiman resided.

== World War II artist (1942–1945) ==
Bar in Hotel Scribe (1944), Smithsonian American Art Museum

At the start of 1942, Floyd Davis was featured in the January edition of American Artist. In 1942, Life Magazine sent Floyd Davis to Bermuda as a war correspondent to cover preparations for World War II. He completed nine paintings, one of which was used for the double page spread at the center of the magazine.

In 1943, Life called Floyd Davis the "#1 illustrator in America".

In 1942, Davis was sent by Life Magazine to England to cover the war. When he arrived at the American Eighth Air Force Bomber Command Post he found the troops engaged in preparations for a raid on Hamburg. The World War I veteran received permission from Life Magazine and the Defense Department to fly in the raid as a war correspondent. On the morning of July 25, 1943, Floyd Davis flew in the Raid on Hamburg and painted the raid from the sky. It became one of his most famous paintings.

In 1943, Floyd Davis covered the War from England and was able to capture the English people as they lived throughout the siege. His most famous painting of Bob Hope entertaining the troops came from that assignment and still hangs at the Pentagon in Washington, D.C.

Floyd Davis and his wife, Gladys Rockmore Davis were commissioned by Life Magazine to paint liberated Paris in 1944 and 1945 where Gladys narrowly escaped death in a German strafing of Metz. They were the first husband and wife correspondent team ever assigned to cover a War together. Floyd Davis concentrated on the wartime city with American soldiers, while she painted the familiar and nostalgic scenes. A show of their paintings was exhibited in the foyer of the Time-Life Building in 1945.

During their time of covering the war, they became friends with the rest of the correspondents who hung out at The Hotel Scribe Barroom. Floyd depicted the entire group as part of a double page spread in the 1945 Life Magazine. His fellow correspondents included the following: Richard De'Rochemont, David Scherman, Will Lang, Charles Wertenbaker, Ralph Morse, Robert Capa, Janet Flanner, William Shirer, Noel Busch, H.V. Kaltenborn, and Ernest Hemingway.

== Artist and retired illustrator (1946–1956) ==
In 1946, Floyd Davis was featured in a book titled 40 Illustrators and How They Work by Ernest W. Watson. He continued to do some work for major publications like Saturday Evening Post but gradually slipped into retirement and illustrating or painting only for pleasure. During this time he enjoyed the company of his daughter Deborah Davis as they attended symphony and he took pride in the career of his son, Noel Davis, who became a rising star in the New York art world.

== Final chapter (1956–1966) ==
Davis continued to paint during the final decade of his life. His works continued to appear in major print media as illustrations for stories and advertisements. His wife, Gladys Rockmore Davis, continued to exhibit and paint as well. In 1961, he was elected as the 5th inductee into The Illustrators Hall of Fame.

FloyDavis died on October 25, 1966, at the Veterans Administration Hospital, First Avenue at 24th Street. He was 70 years.

Mr. Martin of the Post, said, "Floyd Davis is an artist's artist, without the disadvantage of baffling the average American magazine reader. Men like him lift illustration to a place where it can rub shoulders with the fine arts without a sense of inferiority."
