= John Henry Dolph =

American painter (1835–1903)

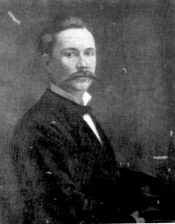
- Self-portrait
- Born: April 18, 1835; Fort Ann, New York
- Died: September 28, 1903 (aged 68); New York City
- Known for: Landscape painting, animal portraits

John Henry Dolph (April 18, 1835 – September 28, 1903) was an American painter. Eventually based in New York City, he became notable for his depictions of pets such as dogs and kittens.

== Life ==
John Henry Dolph was born on April 18, 1835, in Fort Ann, New York. In 1841, his father Osmond relocated the family to Ashtabula County, Ohio. Eight years later, John Dolph began an apprenticeship as a carriage painter in Columbus. From 1855, he worked as a portrait painter in Cleveland and Detroit. In 1861 he was listed as "J. Henri Dolph".

Dolph moved to New York City in 1864 where his works were annually exhibited in the National Academy of Design until 1900. By the end of the 1860s decade, he had also become a prominent landscape painter. From 1870 to 1873 he studied in Antwerp, Belgium, and took further studies in Paris from 1880 to 1882. Afterwards he specialised in painting pet animals such as dogs and cats. In New York, Dolph became a member of the Kit Kat Club of avant-garde artists, the Lotus Club and the Salmagundi Club. He was elected into the National Academy of Design in 1877 as an Associate member, and became a full Academician in 1898.

Dolph lived in the Sherwood Studio Building at 57th and 6th. Sherwood Studio was the first apartment building in NYC made specifically for artists.

John H. Dolph died in New York City on September 28, 1903.

== Reception ==
Among others, Dolph received a favourable review by the New York Tribune in 1892. His achievement in the painting of cats was compared to John George Brown's work of street urchins by The Recorder. Dolph has also been called "the Landseer of America".

== Selected works ==
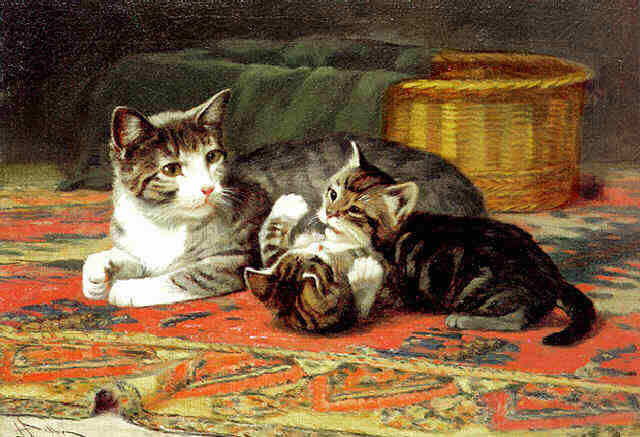
"A Cat with her Kittens"

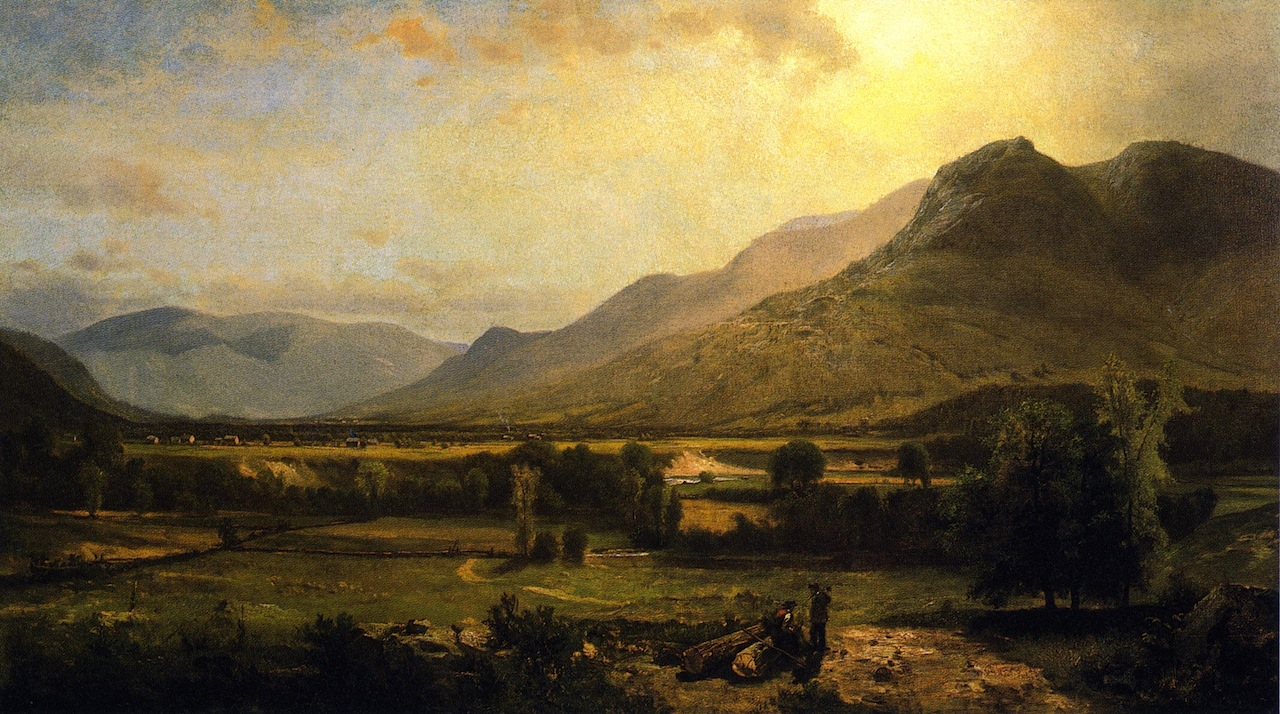
"The Adirondack Mountains, Near Elizabethtown, Essex Co., N.Y." (1866)

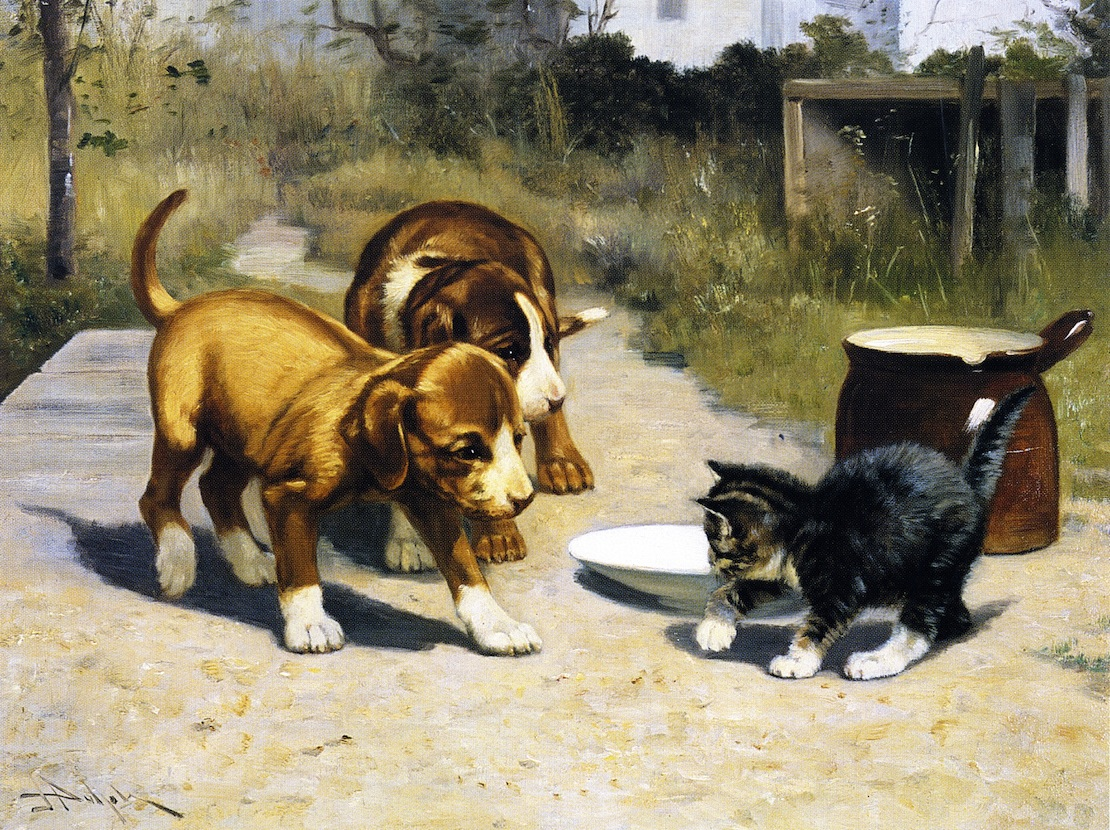
"Courage is Half the Battle"
