= Ruthie the Duck Girl =

American woman (1934–2008)

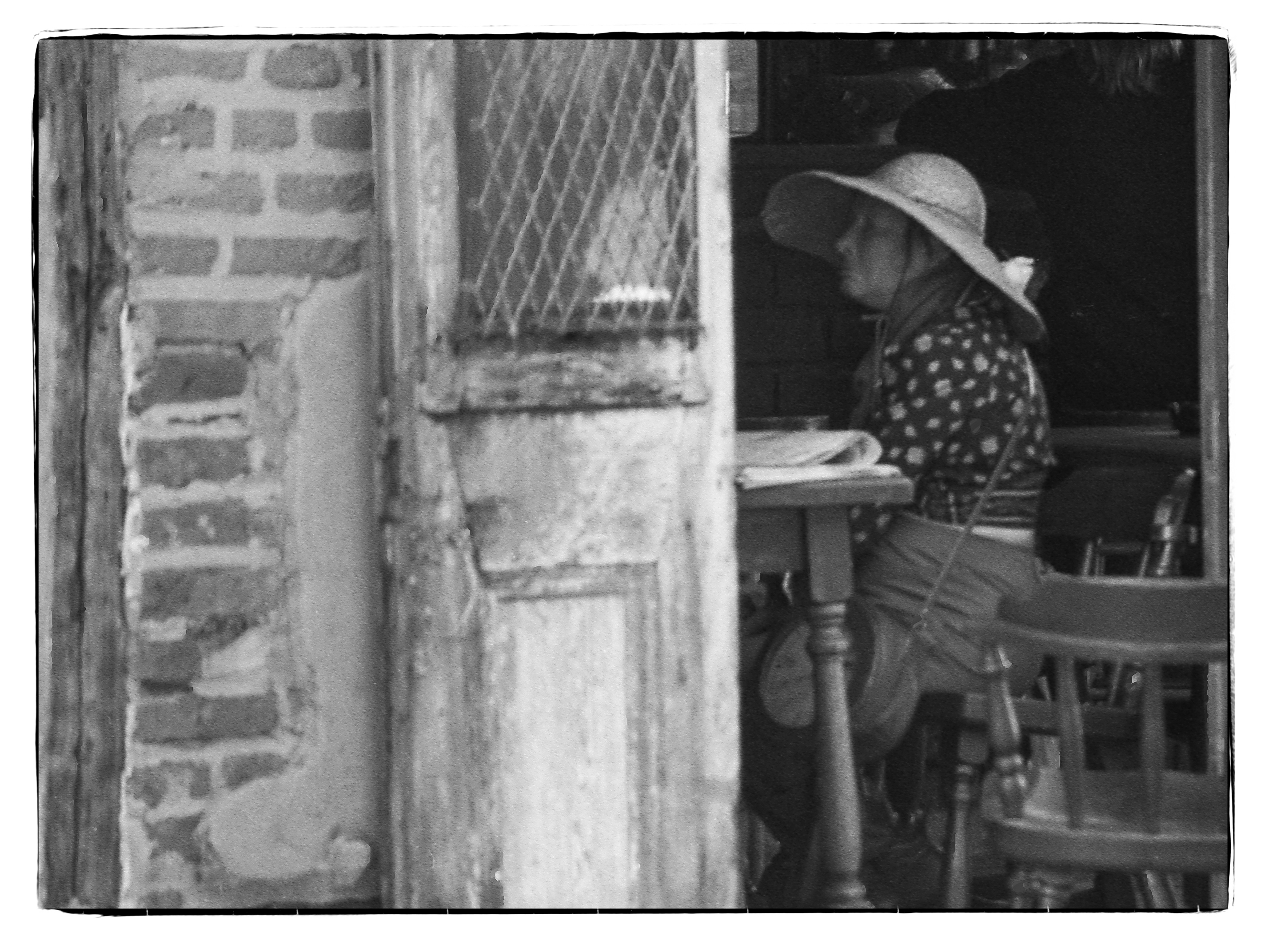
Ruthie at Lafitte's Blacksmith Shop bar in the French Quarter, 1990

Ruth Grace Moulon (January 19, 1934 – September 6, 2008), known as Ruthie the Duck Girl, was an American woman who was a notable figure in the French Quarter of New Orleans. She was often seen riding from bar to bar on roller skates wearing eccentric furs, drinking Budweiser and smoking Kool cigarettes while accompanied by a couple of ducks.

Every year, Ruthie would attend Mardi Gras parades in a wedding dress, stating she was to marry her long lost love, Gary Moody of the Moody Barn, whom she met while he was visiting during his time in the Navy.

According to local photographer David Richmond, “She’s not out of touch with reality; she’s just not interested.”

Ruthie died September 6, 2008, at Our Lady of the Lake Hospital in Baton Rouge, Louisiana. She was 74.
