= Gladys Rockmore Davis =

American painter

- Born: Gladys Rockmore; May 11, 1901; New York City, NY, U.S.
- Died: February 16, 1967 (aged 65); New York City, U.S.
- Education: California School of Fine Arts, Art Institute of Chicago, Art Students League
- Known for: Painter
- Movement: Impressionism
- Spouse: Floyd MacMillan Davis
- Awards: William R. French Gold Medal; Beck Gold Medal (Pennsylvania Academy of the Fine Arts); Isador Gold Medal (National Academy of Design)
- Patrons: Upjohn, Munsingwear, Elgin Watches, Johnson & Johnson

Gladys Rockmore Davis (May 11, 1901 – February 16, 1967) was an American artist who worked in both commercial and fine arts. She gave up a career in advertising art to work in creative painting. Her work in pastels ranks with her oils, and her chief subjects are children, nudes, and still lifes. She also painted ballet dancers, vignettes of liberated Paris, and scenes of Spain. An art critic once called Davis "the ten-year wonder of United States art". Her husband Floyd Davis and her son Noel Rockmore were well-known artists as well.

== 1901–1921: early life ==
Born in New York City, on May 11, 1901, Gladys Rockmore was the daughter of David William Rockmore and Jeanette (Richman) Rockmore. Her family lived in New York until Gladys was nine years old. Her father, a lawyer and metallurgist, moved the family to Canada shortly after he was suspended from his New York legal practice for 6 months for “inappropriately reflecting on the character of a New York Municipal Court Justice”. Gladys and her brother, Julian Rockmore, adapted as her family moved frequently over the next five years within Canada.

Although neither of her parents had any artistic inclinations, they encouraged her and sent her to Saturday classes at the California School of Fine Arts.

== 1917–1925: education and early career ==
At the age of sixteen, Davis entered the Art Institute of Chicago, where she studied with John Norton and George Bellows. She spoke affectionately of Norton, who "taught me to look, to see, really to use my eyes. He showed me the vast difference between the actual distortion of reality and the 'pretty' distortion of the average point of view." She praised the Art Institute of Chicago, not only for its teaching, but also for having a museum where the students could compare their work with the works of masters. Rockmore graduated in 1920 and went on to work as an artist in advertising and fashion for the next eleven years. Davis’s artwork appeared in several major fashion catalogs over the next few years, including Marshall Field's and Vogue. She was recognized as a fine artist and often did the front or back cover. She was hired at Grauman Brothers Advertising in Chicago, the first woman hired by the firm, whose artistic staff were all men.

She met Floyd Davis, the top artist at Grauman's for illustrations and commercial work. They began a secret relationship and eventual courtship. As soon as Gladys entered the studio, Floyd's output dwindled. As the weeks went by, he produced less. At the end of two months, the management asked her to leave; she and Davis subsequently married.

== 1925–1936: marriage and family ==
In 1925, Gladys Rockmore Davis (the name she used for the rest of her career) left the studio and became a freelance advertising artist. After their marriage, the couple moved to New York where Floyd, dividing his time between advertising and magazine illustration, soon became top man in both fields. Art editors had to compete with art directors of advertising agencies for his drawings.

In 1932 they moved with their two young children to Cannes, returning to New York a year later. After their return David struggled with commercial work and began studying at the Art Students League. She later spent time working with George Grosz.

Davis painted subjects with which she was familiar. Her two children, Noel and Deborah, posed for many paintings from their babyhood through their youth.

== 1937–1947: recognition and World War II ==
Recognition came soon for her work as a fine artist. Davis won the William R. French Gold Medal at the Art Institute of Chicago in 1937 and was recommended for the 1938 purchase prize by the Virginia Museum of Fine Arts at Richmond, Virginia. In 1939 she received honorable mention from the Pennsylvania Academy of Fine Arts, and third honorable mention from the Corcoran Gallery of Art, Washington, D.C. The Metropolitan Museum of Art in New York bought her August Afternoon in 1940.

She won other prizes from museums throughout the country, and in 1941 she gave her first one-man show at the Rehn Gallery in New York City. After she had two additional one-man shows at the Midtown Gallery in New York, an art critic described Davis as "the ten-year wonder of United States art".

A critic of the Art Digest (May 1, 1943) wrote that Davis was "one of our strongest women artists, who is not so much concerned with fantasy as she is with painting a good solid, professional picture". Her first book, Pastel Painting, was published in 1943. At the Metropolitan Opera House in 1944, Davis made many intimate sketches of the ballet from backstage, and other studies in the dressing rooms for Life magazine.

During World War II, her ballet sketches were exhibited in Bonwit Teller store windows. Davis worked inside the store sketching ballerinas; she gave her drawings away to persons who purchased $100 war bonds. She received a citation from the United States Government in 1945 in recognition of this service.

Davis and her husband were commissioned by Life magazine to paint liberated Paris in 1944 and 1945. She narrowly escaped death in a German strafing of Metz. Floyd Davis concentrated on the wartime city with American soldiers in force, while she painted familiar and nostalgic scenes of the City of Light. Reviewing the show, which was exhibited in the foyer of the Time-Life Building in 1945, a critic from the New York World-Telegram commented, "This was an uncertain, frightened city Gladys Rockmore Davis was painting.“ Their 44 works from World War II are now held by The US Army Center of Military History(link) in Washington D.C.

Davis was selected to participate in the first art show sponsored by the Encyclopædia Britannica in 1945. That year, she also won the Pepsi-Cola "Portrait of America Show" popular prize. Her second book, Gladys Rockmore Davis, was published in 1945 by American Artist Group.

Her work was published as the cover of both Art News and the Life Christmas Issue in 1947. Her artwork was converted to a wearable silk by The Onondaga Silk Company, and collected and displayed by the Cleveland Museum of Art in 1947.

== 1947–1958: commercial artist ==
In the late 1940s Gladys Rockmore Davis became a featured artist for commercial advertisements for major companies including Upjohn, Munsingwear, Elgin Watches, and Johnson & Johnson, for whom she produced a series of ads that were also available as prints.

In 1951, Davis won the Gold Medal from the Pennsylvania Academy of Fine Arts. She was selected as a full Academician at the National Academy of Design. When she visited Spain in 1952, she was inspired to paint new work. Her ensuing one-man show, held in April 1953, was called "Paintings of Spain." She also produced a series of portraits of both children and adults during this time. One of those portraits was of her cousin by marriage, Clara Rockmore. The singer used that portrait as the cover for her Art of the Theremin album in 1977. In 1953, Davis's work was featured again on the cover of American Artist with a charcoal of her new “back view” series.

In 1955, Davis won the National Academy of Design Isador Gold Medal for her figure, back view, “White Petticoat.”

By 1956, her son, Noel Davis had come to the attention of the New York art world and was considered a rising young star. He won many awards and gained critical acclaim.

In November 1956, after a visit to the Orient, Davis has a show at the Midtown Gallery featuring her impressions of Balinese dancers. In July 1957, Davis donated artwork for the 1957 Holiday Card of the United Nations Children's Fund. In 1958, she had her final show at the Babcock Gallery, featuring pastels of flowers.

== 1959–1967: last years ==
Davis continued to paint during the final decade of her life. She served as a judge for shows and closely followed the career of her son, who legally changed his name in 1959 from Noel Davis to Noel Rockmore. Her works continued to be published in major print media as illustrations for stories. Her husband Floyd Davis, retired from illustration and was one of the first members inducted into The Illustrators Hall of Fame.

Gladys Rockmore Davis died at the French Hospital in New York City on February 16, 1967; both of her children were with her.
