= Gertrude Morgan =

African-American artist (1900–1980)

Sister Gertrude Morgan
- Born: Gertrude Williams; April 7, 1900; LaFayette, Alabama, United States
- Died: July 8, 1980 (aged 80); New Orleans, Louisiana, United States
- Resting place: Providence Memorial Park, Jefferson Parish; 29.976871°N 90.227854°W
- Style: Outsider art
- Spouse: Will Morgan (1928-?)

Sister Gertrude Morgan (April 7, 1900 – July 8, 1980) was a self-taught African-American artist, musician, poet and preacher. Born in LaFayette, Alabama, she relocated to New Orleans in 1939, where she lived and worked until her death in 1980. Sister Morgan achieved critical acclaim during her lifetime for her folk art paintings. Her work has been included in many groundbreaking exhibitions of visionary and folk art from the 1970s onwards.

== Early life ==
Sister Morgan was born Gertrude Williams in Lafayette, Alabama, to mother Frances "Fannie" Williams and father Edward Williams. She was the seventh child of a poor rural family.

For reasons unknown, Sister Morgan left school before completing the third grade. Around 1917 her family moved to Columbus, Georgia, where she worked as a servant and nursemaid in a private home.

== Marriage ==
Gertrude Williams married Will Morgan on February 12, 1928. She lived with her husband at 1324 North Avenue in Columbus, GA. While there is no evidence of a divorce, it is known that Sister Morgan left Columbus alone in 1938, traveling first to Alabama and then to New Orleans, where she would settle.

== Call to religion ==
=== Early involvement in the church ===
Sister Morgan's first documented involvement with religion came in her late teens, when she joined the Rose Hill Memorial Baptist Church, a local congregation in Columbus, Georgia. After she began painting in 1956, Sister Morgan documented this time in her life in the paintings THE ROSE HILL MEMORiAL BAPTiST CHURCH, Columbus Ga. (n.d.) and Rose Hill Memorial Baptist Church (n.d.). These paintings narrate the shifts in the Rose Hill church leadership, after the death of Reverend Miller in 1930.

=== Revelations from God ===
The first of many revelations that Gertrude was to experience came in 1934. The story of this revelation is inscribed on one of her paintings, 1324 NO AVE COLUMBUS GA. (n.d.). On it she has written, "Sitting in my Kitchen one night I heard a great strong Voice speak to me said I'll make thee as a signet for I have chosen thee I got this calling on the 30th day of Dec in 1934 I had to answere to my calling and one day give up and Pack up and go … a chosen vessel of God's its wonderful to Be. God called me a chased me and turned me into the hands of his son and JESUS said take up your cross and follow me."

In 1938 a second revelation followed, in the form of a voice that said, "Go-o-o-o-o, Preacher, tell it to the World". It was in this year that she left Columbus, first for Opelika, Alabama, then to Mobile and possibly Montgomery. She worked as a nursemaid and nanny in Opelika and Mobile, and possibly began work as a healer and street prophet during this time.

=== Orphanage in New Orleans ===
When she arrived in New Orleans in 1939, Sister Gertrude met Mother Margaret Parker and Sister Cora Williams. The two women were involved in the Holiness and Sanctified movement, an African American faith in which the activities of music, song and dance were central. The three women soon established a mission and orphanage at Mother Parker's house at 533 Flake Avenue in Lower Gentilly, then on the outskirts of New Orleans. The orphanage was funded by money raised from preaching and performing in the streets.

The three women adopted black robes, and gave shelter to as many as twenty orphans and runaways at a time. (In Sister Gertrude's paintings, the three women are pictured in their black robes, adorned with white collars, cuffs and waist ties). As Gentilly was a fairly rural area at this time, they raised livestock and grew vegetables on the land surrounding the large house. They held neighborhood feasts at the Orphanage, where the 'Prophetesses' (as Sister Morgan would later name them in her paintings) would play the piano, drums, cymbals and beat tambourines. In addition to street preaching, the three women visited Orleans Parish Prison, providing spiritual guidance for inmates, as well as traveling to other towns in Louisiana and Texas for church camps and meetings. Sister Morgan worked at the orphanage until 1957.

=== Everlasting Gospel Mission ===
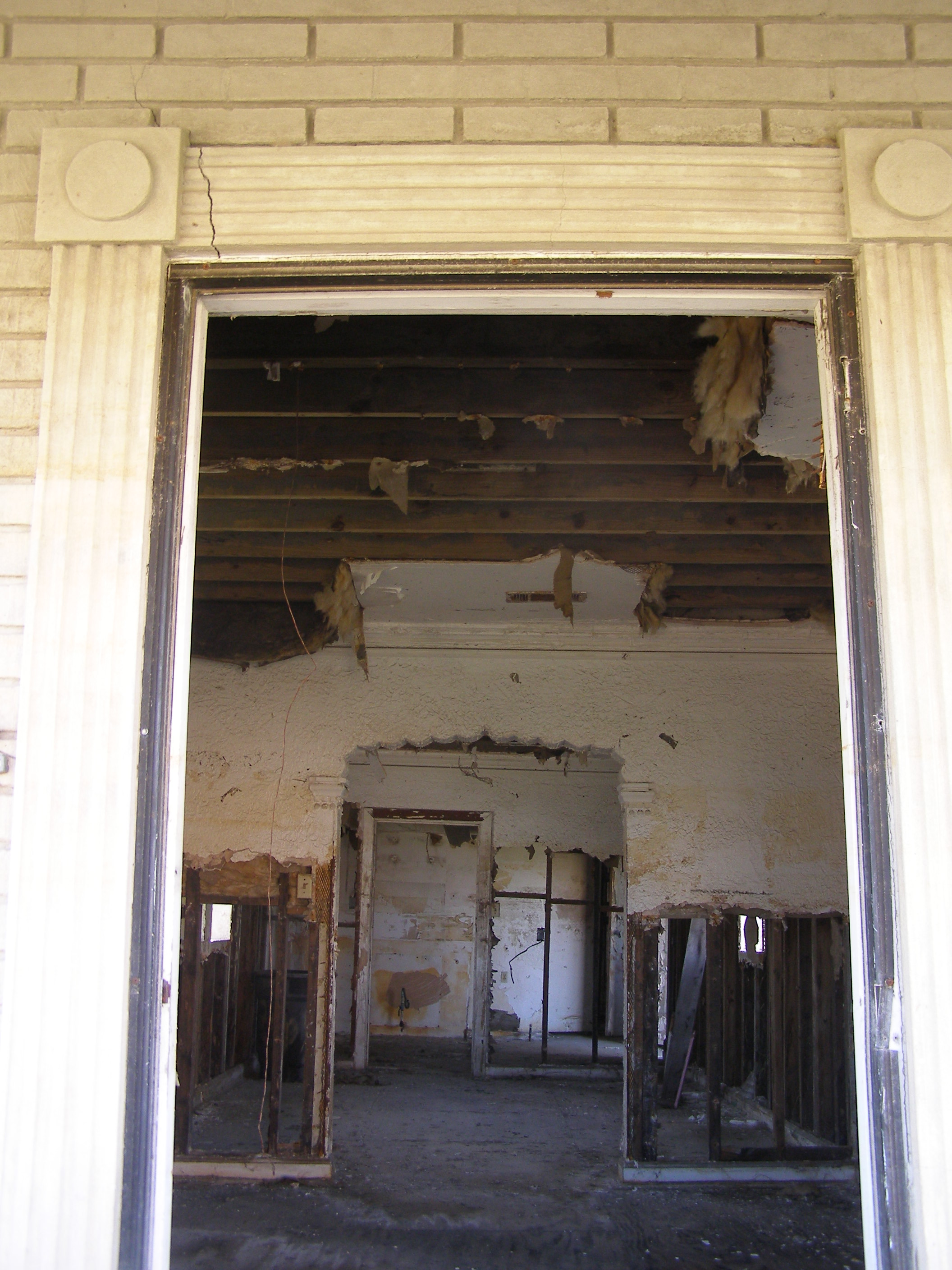
Doorway of Sister Gertrude's former home/mission in the Lower 9th Ward, 2007.

After leaving Gentilly, Sister Morgan roomed in various houses, mostly in the Lower Ninth Ward, an historically African-American neighborhood in Orleans Parish. Eventually she settled at 5444 North Dorgenois street in the Lower Ninth, in a single shotgun house with the owner of the property, Jennie Johnson. The lawn of the property was allegedly covered in four leafed clovers, a detail that can be glimpsed in black and white photographs of the property. She named it the "Everlasting Gospel Mission", and turned the first room of the house into a prayer room where she would give sermons. Her paintings adorned the white walls of the prayer room, which also contained a small desk, a tapping stick, musical instruments and her painted paper megaphones that she would use to preach.

Morgan's former house and mission remained a neighborhood landmark after her death. Like the rest of the neighborhood, it was severely damaged in the Federal levee failure flood disaster during Hurricane Katrina in 2005. The damaged house was gutted in hopes it could be repaired and renovated, but was subsequently demolished.

=== Bride of Christ ===
In 1957 Sister Morgan received another revelation from God. Dreaming, she heard a voice that told her she was the Bride of Christ. She then discarded her black missionary attire in favor of an all-white ensemble made up of a nurses' uniform, peaked nurses' cap and matching white shoes.

== Artwork ==
In 1956, Sister Gertrude Morgan received another revelation from God urging her to paint. She understood the act of painting as a tool to be used in her service to the Lord, just as she used music in her street preaching. Sister Morgan used her early paintings as visual aids in her sermons and teachings, often with children. Her paintings depict religious subject matter almost exclusively, illustrating scenes from scripture. The Book of Revelation was of special significance, and provided subject matter that she would return to over and over again in her work.

=== Style ===
Similar to other self-taught artists, Sister Morgan used simple forms to depict the human figure. Her works are characterized by their lack of the use of formal techniques such as perspective and definition of light and shadow, giving them a flat, two dimensional quality. She painted and drew using acrylics, tempera, ballpoint pen, watercolors, crayon, colored and lead pencils and felt tip markers. Using inexpensive materials she had at hand, Sister Morgan painted on paper, toilet rolls, plastic pitchers, paper megaphones, scrap wood, lampshades, paper fans and styrofoam trays. The fact that she was self-taught, coupled with her choice of materials as well as her style and subject matter have led her to be characterized as a naive, folk, visionary, vernacular and outsider artist.

=== Subject matter ===
Originally conceiving her artworks as appendages to her gospel teachings, Sister Morgan's paintings are often inscribed with passages from scripture and lyrics to popular gospel songs. Similarly, her paintings that document her childhood, early adulthood and first years in New Orleans are inscribed with the narratives of specific events, that often reference her evangelical activities.

Morgan particularly favored the Book of Revelation. William A. Fagaly writes, "The apocalyptic text of the Book of Revelation offers a plethora of visionary images: the Apocalypse and its four horsemen, the Antichrist, the Whore of Babylon, the Beast (with the mark 666), the heavenly book of seven seals, Armageddon, the return of the Jews to the Holy Land, the millennial kingdom of Christ on Earth, and the New Jerusalem." It is for her paintings of New Jerusalem that Sister Morgan is most well known. The holy city of New Jerusalem "coming down from God out of heaven" was consistently depicted as a multi-story apartment building in her compositions. In some of her New Jerusalem paintings, a choir of interracial angels adorns the sky. The choir of angels frequents many of her paintings, sometimes as one of many elements in a composition, and other times as the sole subject.

Another recurring image in her work is a self-portrait as the Bride of Christ, riding with Jesus in an airplane. There is speculation that this references the hymn "Oh, Jesus Is My Air-o-plane", recorded in 1930. Another hymn, "Jesus, Savior, Pilot Me", first published in 1871 by Edward Hopper, establishes a related Jesus-as-pilot motif.

Her later work is characterized by the dominance of the inscriptions. Her imagery becomes sparse and in some compositions non-existent.

Sister Morgan signed her paintings with many names, among them Black Angel, Lamb Bride, Nurse to Doctor Jesus, Everlasting Gospel Revelation Preacher, Bride of Christ and Little Ethiopia Girl.

=== Career ===
Around 1960, art dealer Larry Borenstein met Sister Morgan while she was preaching in the French Quarter. He invited her to perform and exhibit work in his art gallery after coming upon her shouting on a street corner with a paper megaphone. Borenstein cultivated an audience for her work by introducing her paintings to collectors, artists, museums and galleries. Lee Friedlander and Andy Warhol were both fans of her work. Warhol was an occasional correspondent, while Friedlander used Sister Morgan as a subject in his photographs.

In 1970 poet and performer Rod McKuen, a fan and collector of Morgan's work, used thirteen of her illustrations to accompany a book of Bible quotations, God's Greatest Hits. It sold more than 300,000 copies.

One of the tempera and paint illustrations from God's Greatest Hits is held by the Smithsonian's Evans-Tibbs Collection. Her artwork Let's Make a Record from the 1970s is in the permanent collection of Pérez Art Museum Miami.

=== Major exhibitions ===
In 1970, Sister Morgan's work was shown at the Arts and Science Centre in Baton Rouge, LA.

In 1973 her work was included in the exhibition Louisiana Folk Paintings at the Museum of American Folk Art (now the American Folk Art Museum) in New York. The three-person exhibit displayed over 75 of Sister Morgan's paintings, alongside fellow visionary artists Clementine Hunter and Bruce Brice. It was also in 1973 that NOMA exhibited Sister Morgan's work for the first time, in a show titled Naive Art in Louisiana.

In 1982 the exhibition Black Folk Art in America, 1930-1980 featured 20 artists (including Sister Morgan) and close to 400 paintings and sculptures. It opened at the Corcoran Museum of Art and toured to the San Francisco Museum of Modern Art, Saint Louis Art Museum, Baltimore Museum of Art, Des Moines Art Center and Cleveland Museum of Art.

In 2004, the first major retrospective of Morgan's work, The Tools of Her Ministry: the Art of Sister Gertrude Morgan, opened at the Folk Art Museum in New York City. The exhibition was curated by William A. Fagaly, former director of the New Orleans Museum of Art (NOMA). This exhibition then traveled to NOMA and later to The Center for Intuitive and Outsider Art in Chicago. The exhibition was accompanied by a catalogue containing essays by William A. Fagaly, Jason A. Berry, and Helen M. Shannon.

=== End of painting ===
Sister Morgan's art brought her fame and notoriety, something she reportedly both enjoyed and felt conflicted about. In 1973 she announced that the Lord had ordered her to cease painting in order to concentrate on her preaching and poetry. "Painting now? Oh no," she reportedly said in 1974. "I'm way too worried. Worrying about what time it is and praying on people's cases."

== Music ==
Music was another tool of Sister Morgan's ministry. In the early 1970s, Let's Make A Record was recorded in order to capture Morgan singing and playing her tambourine. In 2004 the original album was re-released on the Preservation Hall Recordings label.

In 2005, the Ropeadope label released King Britt presents Sister Gertrude Morgan, which took the a cappella/tambourine recordings of Let's Make A Record and added contemporary beat programming and instrumentation. The album received rave reviews and created a new, young audience for Sister Gertrude Morgan. The album artwork featured her paintings.

== Works or publications ==
- Morgan, Gertrude. Let's Make a Record. [New Orleans, Louisiana]: Preservation Hall Recordings, 2004. Recorded live in the Prayer Room, 511 Royal Street, New Orleans, Louisiana.
- Britt, King, and Gertrude Morgan. King Britt Presents Sister Gertrude Morgan. [New York]: Ropeadope, 2005. Sister Gertrude Morgan originally recorded at the Preservation Hall, New Orleans, 1968. King Britt recorded at the Hut and Nautica, Philadelphia.
- Levin, Gail. Art in Progress: Sister Gertrude (2004)

== Death ==
On July 8, 1980, Sister Morgan died in her sleep at her home in the Lower Ninth Ward. Her funeral arrangements were made by Larry Borenstein and a service was held at the well-to-do House of Bultman, on St. Charles Avenue. Her art work was displayed at the service, and Let's Make a Record played.

== See also ==
- Outsider art
