= Hot Fives & Sevens =

1999 box-set recordings by Louis Armstrong

Box set by Louis Armstrong
- Released: October 26, 1999
- Recorded: Nov 12, 1925 – Apr 5, 1930
- Genre: Jazz
- Length: 276:23
- Label: JSP

Louis Armstrong chronology
The Complete Ella Fitzgerald & Louis Armstrong on Verve (1997)	Hot Fives & Sevens (1999)	The Legendary Berlin Concert (2000)

Hot Fives & Sevens is a 2000 box set collection of recordings made by American jazz trumpeter and singer Louis Armstrong with his Hot Five, Hot Seven, and other groups between 1925 and 1930. First released on JSP Records on 22 August 2000, the set was subsequently reissued on Definitive in 2001. A four-disc compilation, the set has received a "crown" as an author's pick in The Penguin Guide to Jazz and is also included in the book's "core collection" recommended for jazz fans. AllMusic concurs that it is "beyond indispensable", adding that "you can't have a Louis Armstrong collection without this historic set" or "any kind of respectable jazz collection." Alternatively, Ben Ratliff, writing in 2002, preferred Columbia's release The Complete Hot Five and Hot Seven Recordings.

== Overview ==
The box set consists of four compact discs. The first and second discs, and part of the third, comprise the Hot Five and Hot Seven recording sessions from 1925 through 1928. The third and fourth discs compile tracks recorded by Carroll Dickerson's Savoyagers, Louis Armstrong and His Orchestra, and Louis Armstrong and His Savoy Ballroom Five (with Earl Hines) between 1928 and 1930.

== Critical reception ==
Professional ratings
Review scores
Source	Rating
AllMusic	5/5 stars
The Penguin Guide to Jazz	👑(Core Collection)

The collection has generally earned praise. Music critic Cub Koda, writing for AllMusic, notes that "Although this material has been around the block several times before – and continues to be available in packages greatly varying in transfer quality – this is truly the way to go, and certainly the most deluxe packaging this material has ever received with the greatest sound retrieval yet employed." The Penguin Guide to Jazz included Hot Fives & Sevens in its "Core Collection," and assigned its "crown" accolade to the album, along with a four-star rating (of a possible four stars). (The first three discs from this set, JSP CD 312 – 314, individually received four-star ratings, and are also included in the Core Collection.) Penguin editors Richard Cook and Brian Morton remarked, "John R. T. Davies's remastering for JSP is superlative. Armstrong scholars argue over whether the Columbia 'definitive' edition – mystifyingly delayed – is superior, but it's hard to see anyone being disappointed with either." 2008's Jazz : The Basics is not as effusive, suggesting that other remasters may sound better and other packaging may be more complete, but the lower price of this set made it "an attractive package for recordings that are a necessary part of any CD collection." Ben Ratliff, by contrast, found the collection only a "tolerable alternative to Columbia's muffled-sounding initial CD reissue", but preferred Columbia Legacy's The Complete Hot Five and Hot Seven Recordings (C4K 63257) for its greater "bright and present" sound.

== Track listing ==
Except where otherwise noted, all songs composed by Louis Armstrong.

=== Disc one ===
1. "My Heart" (Lil Armstrong) – 2:27
2. "Yes! I'm in the Barrel" – 2:40
3. "Gut Bucket Blues" – 2:45
4. "Come Back Sweet Papa" (Barbarin, Russell) – 2:32
5. "Georgia Grind" (Spencer Williams) – 2:36
6. "Heebie Jeebies" (Atkins, Stothart) – 2:56
7. "Cornet Chop Suey" – 3:19
8. "Oriental Strut" (Saint Cyr) – 3:03
9. "You're Next" – 3:17
10. "Muskrat Ramble" (Ray Gilbert, Kid Ory) – 2:34
11. "Don't Forget to Mess Around" (Armstrong, Barbarin) – 3:04
12. "I'm Gonna Gitcha" (Lil Hardin) – 2:46
13. "Droppin' Shucks" (Hardin) – 2:54
14. "Who' Sit" (Composer uncredited) – 2:47
15. "He Likes It Slow" (J. Edwards) – 2:44
16. "The King of the Zulus (A Chit'lin' Rag)" (Lil Armstrong) – 3:07
17. "Big Fat Ma and Skinny Pa" (Richard M. Jones) – 3:02
18. "Lonesome Blues" (Hardin) – 3:05
19. "Sweet Little Papa" (Ory) – 2:47
20. "Jazz Lips" (Hardin) – 3:03
21. "Skid-Dat-De-Dat" (Hardin) – 3:07
22. "Big Butter and Egg Man" (Armstrong, Percy Venable) – 3:01
23. "Sunset Cafe Stomp" (Armstrong, Venable) – 2:47
24. "You Made Me Love You" (Armstrong, Venable) – 2:54
25. "Irish Black Bottom" (Armstrong, Venable) – 2:37

=== Disc two ===
1. "Willie the Weeper" (Marty Bloom, Walter Melrose, Grant Rymal) – 3:10
2. "Wild Man Blues" (Armstrong, Morton) – 3:13
3. "Chicago Breakdown" (Morton) – 3:21
4. "Alligator Crawl" (Joe Davis, Razaf, Waller) – 3:04
5. "Potato Head Blues" – 2:58
6. "Melancholy Blues" (Bloom, Melrose) – 3:05
7. "Weary Blues" (Matthews) – 3:01
8. "Twelfth Street Rag" (Bowman) – 3:06
9. "Keyhole Blues" (Wilson) – 3:29
10. "S.O.L. Blues" – 2:55
11. "Gully Low Blues" – 3:18
12. "That's When I'll Come Back to You" (Biggs) – 2:58
13. "Put 'Em Down Blues" (E.J. Bennett) – 3:17
14. "Ory's Creole Tombstone" (Ory) – 3:07
15. "The Last Time" (Ewing, Martin) – 3:32
16. "Struttin' With Some Barbecue" (Hardin, Don Raye) – 3:06
17. "Got No Blues" (Hardin) – 3:26
18. "Once in a While" (William Butler) – 3:19
19. "I'm Not Rough" (Armstrong, Hardin) – 3:05
20. "Hotter Than That" (Armstrong, Hardin) – 3:05
21. "Savoy Blues" (Ory) – 3:28

=== Disc three ===
1. "Fireworks" (Clarence Williams, S. Williams) – 3:09
2. "Skip the Gutter" (S. Williams) – 3:10
3. "A Monday Date" (Earl Hines, Robin) – 3:15
4. "Don't Jive Me" (Hardin) – 2:50
5. "West End Blues" (King Oliver, C. Williams) – 3:21
6. "Sugar Foot Strut" (Pierce) – 3:23
7. "Two Deuces" (Hardin) – 2:58
8. "Squeeze Me" (Waller, C. Williams) – 3:26
9. "Knee Drops" (Hardin) – 3:28
10. "Symphonic Raps" (Maurice Abrahams) – 3:15
11. "Savoyagers' Stomp" (Armstrong, Hines) – 3:13
12. "No, Papa, No" (Victoria Spivey) – 2:54
13. "Basin Street Blues" (S. Williams) – 3:16
14. "No One Else But You" (Redman) – 3:24
15. "Beau Koo Jack" (Armstrong, Alex Hill, Melrose) – 3:01
16. "Save It, Pretty Mama" (Davis, Paul Denniker, Redman) – 3:19
17. "Weather Bird" – 2:42
18. "Muggles" (Armstrong, Hines) – 2:52
19. "Hear Me Talking to Ya?" (Armstrong, Redman) – 3:17
20. "St. James Infirmary" (Joe Primrose, Traditional) – 3:14
21. "Tight Like This" (Armstrong, Curl) – 3:12
22. "Knockin' a Jug" (Armstrong, Condon) – 3:15

=== Disc four ===
1. "I Can't Give You Anything But Love" (Dorothy Fields, Jimmy McHugh) – 3:26
2. "Mahogany Hall Stomp" (S. Williams) – 3:18
3. "Ain't Misbehavin'" (Harry Brooks, Razaf, Waller) – 3:16
4. "Black and Blue" (Brooks, Razaf, Waller) – 3:03
5. "That Rhythm Man" (Brooks, Razaf, Waller) – 3:05
6. "Sweet Savannah Sue" (Brooks, Razaf, Waller) – 3:09
7. "Some of These Days" (Shelton Brooks) – 2:55
8. "Some of These Days" (S. Brooks) – 3:07
9. "When You're Smiling (The Whole World Smiles With You)" (Mark Fisher, Joe Goodwin, Larry Shay) – 2:53
10. "When You're Smiling (The Whole World Smiles With You)" (Fisher, Goodwin, Shay) – 3:25
11. "After You've Gone" (Henry Creamer, Turner Layton) – 3:17
12. "I Ain't Got Nobody" (S. Williams) – 2:41
13. "Dallas Blues" (Lloyd Garrett, Hart A. Wand) – 3:11
14. "St. Louis Blues" (Handy) – 2:58
15. "Rockin' Chair" (Carmichael) – 3:17
16. "Song of the Islands" (King) – 3:32
17. "Bessie Couldn't Help It" (Charles A. Bayha, Jacques Richmond, Byron Warner) – 3:24
18. "Blue Turning Grey over You" (Razaf, Waller) – 3:31
19. "Dear Old Southland" (Creamer, Layton) – 3:21
20. "Rockin' Chair" (Carmichael) – 3:16
21. "I Can't Give You Anything But Love" (Fields, McHugh) – 3:27

== Personnel ==
- May Alix – vocals
- Henry "Red" Allen – trumpet
- Gene Anderson – cello, piano
- Lil Armstrong – piano, vocals
- Louis Armstrong – cornet, slide whistle, trumpet, vocals
- Boyd Atkins – clarinet, sax (alto), sax (soprano)
- Paul Barbarin – drums
- Pete Briggs – bass
- Butterbeans and Susie (Jody "Butterbeans" Edwards and Susie Hawthorne) – vocals
- Happy Caldwell – sax (tenor)
- Hoagy Carmichael – vocals
- Mancy Carr – banjo, bass, vocals
- Eddie Condon – banjo
- Bert Curry – sax (alto)
- John R.T. Davies – remastering
- Carroll Dickerson – director, violin
- Johnny Dodds – clarinet
- Honore Dutrey – trombone
- Pops Foster – standup bass
- Charles Fox – liner notes
- Tubby Hall – drums
- J.C. Higginbotham – trombone
- Alex Hill – alto
- Teddy Hill – sax (tenor)
- Earl Hines – cello, piano, trumpet, vocals
- Homer Hobson – trumpet
- Charlie Holmes – clarinet, sax (alto)
- Lonnie Johnson – guitar
- Otis Johnson – trumpet
- Max Jones – photo
- Eddie Lang – guitar
- Joseph "Kaiser" Marshall – drums
- Albert Nicholas – sax (alto)
- Kid Ory – trombone
- Don Redman – alto, clarinet, sax (alto), speech/speaker/speaking part
- Fred Robinson – trombone
- Luis Russell – piano
- Zutty Singleton – drums
- Johnny St. Cyr – banjo, guitar
- Jimmy Strong – clarinet, sax (tenor)
- Joe Sullivan – piano
- Jack Teagarden – trombone
- John Thomas – trombone
- Joe Walker – baritone, sax (alto)
- Albert Washington, Jr. – sax (tenor)
- Buck Washington – piano, trumpet
- Crawford Wethington – sax (alto)
- Dave Wilborn – banjo, guitar
- Bill Wilson – cornet
