= Louis Armstrong Hot Five and Hot Seven Sessions =

Album

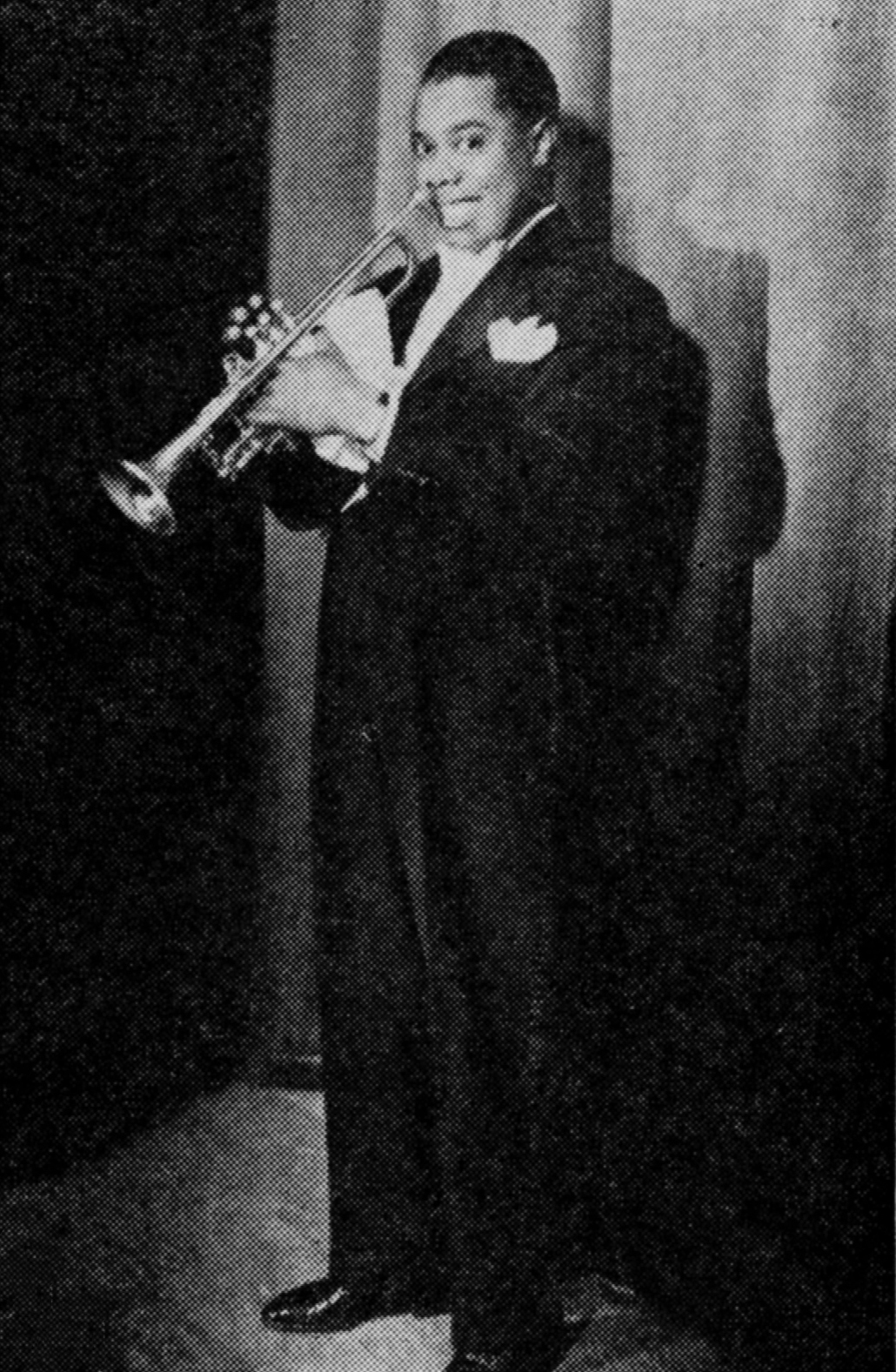
Photo of Armstrong in 1936

The Louis Armstrong Hot Five and Hot Seven Sessions were recorded between 1925 and 1928 by Louis Armstrong with his Hot Five and Hot Seven groups. According to the National Recording Registry, "Louis Armstrong was jazz's first great soloist and is among American music's most important and influential figures. These sessions, his solos in particular, set a standard musicians still strive to equal in their beauty and innovation." These recordings were added to the National Recording Registry in 2002, the first year of the institution's existence.

Ron Wynn and Bruce Boyd Raeburn, writing for the All Music Guide to Jazz, note that "these recordings radically altered jazz's focus; instead of collective playing, Armstrong's spectacular instrumental (and vocal) improvisations redefined the music." Armstrong helped popularize scat singing in "Heebie Jeebies," and his solo on "Potato Head Blues" helped establish the stop-time technique in jazz.

== Recordings ==
=== 1925–1926 Hot Five recordings ===
1. "My Heart" (Lil Armstrong)
2. "Yes! I'm in the Barrel"
3. "Gut Bucket Blues"
4. "Come Back Sweet Papa" (Paul Barbarin, Luis Russell)
5. "Georgia Grind" (Spencer Williams)
6. "Heebie Jeebies" (Boyd Atkins)
7. "Cornet Chop Suey"
8. "Oriental Strut" (Johnny St. Cyr)
9. "You're Next"
10. "Muskrat Ramble" (Kid Ory)
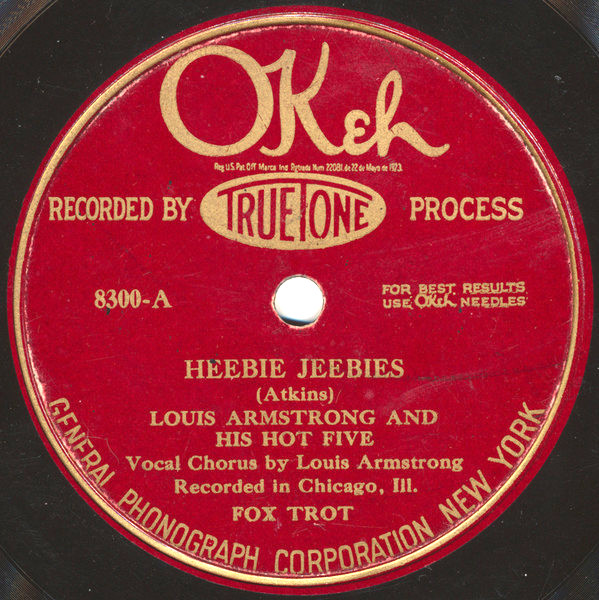
  "Heebie Jeebies" by Louis Armstrong and his Hot Five
11. "Don't Forget to Mess Around" (Barbarin)
12. "I'm Gonna Gitcha" (Lil Hardin)
13. "Droppin' Shucks" (Hardin)
14. "Who' Sit" (Richard M. Jones)
15. "He Likes It Slow" (J. Edwards)
16. "The King of the Zulus" (Lil Armstrong)
17. "Big Fat Ma and Skinny Pa" (Richard M. Jones)
18. "Lonesome Blues" (Hardin)
19. "Sweet Little Papa" (Ory)
20. "Jazz Lips" (Hardin)
21. "Skid-Dat-De-Dat" (Hardin)
22. "Big Butter and Egg Man" (Armstrong, Percy Venable)
23. "Sunset Cafe Stomp" (Armstrong, Venable)
24. "You Made Me Love You" (Armstrong, Venable)
25. "Irish Black Bottom" (Armstrong, Venable)

=== 1927 Hot Seven recordings ===
1. "Willie the Weeper" (Marty Bloom, Walter Melrose)
2. "Wild Man Blues" (Armstrong, "Jelly Roll" Morton)
3. "Chicago Breakdown" (Morton)
4. "Alligator Crawl" (Joe Davis, Andy Razaf, Thomas Waller)
5. "Potato Head Blues"
6. "Melancholy Blues" (Bloom, Melrose)
7. "Weary Blues" (Artie Matthews)
8. "Twelfth Street Rag" (Euday Bowman)
9. "Keyhole Blues" (Wesley Wilson)
10. "S.O.L. Blues"
11. "Gully Low Blues"
12. "That's When I'll Come Back to You" (Biggs)

=== 1927 Hot Five recordings ===
1. "Put 'Em Down Blues" (Armstrong)
2. "Ory's Creole Trombone" (Ory)
3. "The Last Time" (Ewing, Martin)
4. "Struttin' With Some Barbecue" (Armstrong)
5. "Got No Blues" (Hardin)
6. "Once in a While" (William Butler)
7. "I'm Not Rough" (Armstrong, Hardin)
8. "Hotter Than That" (Hardin)
9. "Savoy Blues" (Ory)

=== 1928 Hot Five recordings ===
1. "Fireworks" (Spencer Williams)
2. "Skip the Gutter" (S. Williams)
3. "A Monday Date" (Earl Hines)
4. "Don't Jive Me" (Hardin)
5. "West End Blues" (King Oliver, C. Williams)
6. "Sugar Foot Strut" (Pierce)
7. "Two Deuces" (Hardin)
8. "Squeeze Me" (Waller, C. Williams)
9. "Knee Drops" (Hardin)

== Recording dates ==
	Title	Artist	Composer	Record label	Issued Number	Master Number	Recording Date	Recording Location	Personnel
1925–1926 Hot Five recordings
1	"Gambler's Dream"	Hociel Thomas Acc. by Louis Armstrong's Jazz Four	Hociel Thomas	OKeh	8289	9471-A	11/11/1925	Chicago	^{[a]}
2	"Sunshine Baby"	Hociel Thomas Acc. by Louis Armstrong's Jazz Four	Hociel Thomas	OKeh	8326	9472-A	11/11/1925	Chicago	^{[a]}
3	"Adam And Eve Had The Blues"	Hociel Thomas Acc. by Louis Armstrong's Jazz Four	Hociel Thomas	OKeh	8258	9473-A	11/11/1925	Chicago	^{[a]}
4	"Put It Where I Can Get It"	Hociel Thomas Acc. by Louis Armstrong's Jazz Four	Hociel Thomas	OKeh	8258	9474-A	11/11/1925	Chicago	^{[a]}
5	"Wash Woman Blues"	Hociel Thomas Acc. by Louis Armstrong's Jazz Four	Hociel Thomas, Bollinger	OKeh	8289	9475-A	11/11/1925	Chicago	^{[a]}
6	"I've Stopped My Man"	Hociel Thomas Acc. by Louis Armstrong's Jazz Four	Hociel Thomas	OKeh	8326	9476-A	11/11/1925	Chicago	^{[a]}
7	"My Heart"	Louis Armstrong and His Hot Five	Lil Armstrong	OKeh	8320	9484-A	11/12/1925	Chicago	^{[b]}
8	"Yes! I'm In The Barrel"	Louis Armstrong and His Hot Five	Louis Armstrong	OKeh	8261	9485-A	11/12/1925	Chicago	^{[b]}
9	"Gut Bucket Blues"	Louis Armstrong and His Hot Five	Louis Armstrong	OKeh	8261	9486-A	11/12/1925	Chicago	^{[b]}
10	"Come Back, Sweet Papa"	Louis Armstrong and His Hot Five	Paul Barbarin, Luis Russell	OKeh	8318	9503-A	2/22/1926	Chicago	^{[b]}
11	"Georgia Grind"	Louis Armstrong and His Hot Five	Spencer Williams	OKeh	8318	9533-A	2/26/1926	Chicago	^{[b]}
12	"Heebie Jeebies"	Louis Armstrong and His Hot Five	B. Atkins	OKeh	8300	9534-A	2/26/1926	Chicago	^{[b]}
13	"Cornet Chop Suey"	Louis Armstrong and His Hot Five	Louis Armstrong	OKeh	8320	9535-A	2/26/1926	Chicago	^{[b]}
N/A	"Cornet Chop Suey" (in E♭)	Louis Armstrong and His Hot Five	Louis Armstrong	OKeh	8320	9535-A	2/26/1926	Chicago	^{[b]}
14	"Oriental Strut"	Louis Armstrong and His Hot Five	Johnny St. Cyr	OKeh	8299	9536-A	2/26/1926	Chicago	^{[b]}
15	"You're Next"	Louis Armstrong and His Hot Five	Louis Armstrong	OKeh	8299	9537-A	2/26/1926	Chicago	^{[b]}
16	"Muskrat Ramble"	Louis Armstrong and His Hot Five	Edward "Kid" Ory	OKeh	8300	9538-A	2/26/1926	Chicago	^{[b]}
17	"Don't Forget To Mess Around"	Louis Armstrong and His Hot Five	Paul Barbarin	OKeh	8343	9729-A	6/16/1926	Chicago	^{[b]}
18	"I'm Gonna Gitcha"	Louis Armstrong and His Hot Five	Lil Hardin	OKeh	8343	9730-A	6/16/1926	Chicago	^{[b]}
19	"Droppin' Shucks"	Louis Armstrong and His Hot Five	Lil Hardin	OKeh	8357	9731-A	6/16/1926	Chicago	^{[b]}
20	"Who'sit"	Louis Armstrong and His Hot Five	Richard M. Jones	OKeh	8357	9732-A	6/16/1926	Chicago	^{[b]}
21	"He Likes It Slow"	Butterbeans and Susie	J. Edwards	Okeh	8355	9750-A	6/18/1926	Chicago	^{[c]}
22	"The King of the Zulus"	Louis Armstrong and His Hot Five	Lil Armstrong	OKeh	8396	9776-A	6/23/1926	Chicago	^{[d]}
23	"Big Fat Ma and Skinny Pa"	Louis Armstrong and His Hot Five	Richard M. Jones	OKeh	8379	9777-A	6/23/1926	Chicago	^{[d]}
24	"Lonesome Blues"	Louis Armstrong and His Hot Five	Lil Hardin	OKeh	8396	9778-A	6/23/1926	Chicago	^{[d]}
25	"Sweet Little Papa"	Louis Armstrong and His Hot Five	Edward "Kid" Ory	OKeh	8379	9779-A	6/23/1926	Chicago	^{[d]}
26	"Jazz Lips"	Louis Armstrong and His Hot Five	Lil Hardin	OKeh	8436	9890-A	11/16/1926	Chicago	^{[e]}
27	"Skid-Dat-De-Dat"	Louis Armstrong and His Hot Five	Lil Hardin	OKeh	8436	9891-A	11/16/1926	Chicago	^{[e]}
28	"Big Butter and Egg Man"	Louis Armstrong and His Hot Five	Louis Armstrong, Percy Venable	OKeh	8423	9892-A	11/16/1926	Chicago	^{[f]}
29	"Sunset Cafe Stomp"	Louis Armstrong and His Hot Five	Louis Armstrong, Percy Venable	OKeh	8423	9893-A	11/16/1926	Chicago	^{[f]}
30	"You Made Me Love You"	Louis Armstrong and His Hot Five	Louis Armstrong, Percy Venable	OKeh	8447	9980-A	11/27/1926	Chicago	^{[g]}
31	"Irish Black Bottom"	Louis Armstrong and His Hot Five	Louis Armstrong, Percy Venable	OKeh	8447	9981-A	11/27/1926	Chicago	^{[g]}
N/A	"Leave Mine Alone"	Louis Armstrong and His Hot Five	Louis Armstrong, Percy Venable	OKeh	Rejected	9982-A	11/27/1926	Chicago	^{[g]}
1927 Hot Seven recordings
32	"Willie the Weeper"	Louis Armstrong and His Hot Seven	Marty Bloom, Walter Melrose	OKeh	8482	W.80847-C	5/7/1927	Chicago	^{[h]}
33	"Wild Man Blues"	Louis Armstrong and His Hot Seven	Louis Armstrong, Fred "Jelly Roll" Morton	OKeh	8474	W.80848-C	5/7/1927	Chicago	^{[h]}
34	"Chicago Breakdown"	Louis Armstrong and His Stompers	Fred "Jelly Roll" Morton	Columbia	36376	W.80851-C	5/9/1927	Chicago	^{[i]}
35	"Alligator Crawl"	Louis Armstrong and His Hot Seven	Andy Razaf, Thomas Waller	OKeh	8482	W.80854-B	5/10/1927	Chicago	^{[j]}
36	"Potato Head Blues"	Louis Armstrong and His Hot Seven	Louis Armstrong	OKeh	8503	W.80855-C	5/10/1927	Chicago	^{[j]}
37	"Melancholy Blues"	Louis Armstrong and His Hot Seven	Marty Bloom, Walter Melrose	OKeh	8496	W.80862-A	5/11/1927	Chicago	^{[j]}
38	"Weary Blues"	Louis Armstrong and His Hot Seven	Artie Matthews	OKeh	8519	W.80863-A	5/11/1927	Chicago	^{[j]}
39	"Twelfth Street Rag"	Louis Armstrong and His Hot Seven	Euday Bowman	Columbia	35663	W.80864-A	5/11/1927	Chicago	^{[j]}
40	"Keyhole Blues"	Louis Armstrong and His Hot Seven	Wesley Wilson	OKeh	8496	W.80876-A	5/13/1927	Chicago	^{[j]}
41	"S.O.L. Blues"	Louis Armstrong and His Hot Seven	Louis Armstrong	Columbia	35661	W.81126-B	5/13/1927	Chicago	^{[j]}
42	"Gully Low Blues"	Louis Armstrong and His Hot Seven	Louis Armstrong	OKeh	8474	W.80877-D	5/14/1927	Chicago	^{[j]}
43	"That's When I'll Come Back to You"	Louis Armstrong and His Hot Seven	F. Biggs	OKeh	8519	W.80884-B	5/14/1927	Chicago	^{[j]}
1927 Hot Five recordings
44	"Put 'Em Down Blues"	Louis Armstrong and His Hot Five	Louis Armstrong	OKeh	8503	W.81302-B	9/2/1927	Chicago	^{[k]}
45	"Ory's Creole Trombone"	Louis Armstrong and His Hot Five	Edward "Kid" Ory	Columbia	35838	W.81310-D	9/2/1927	Chicago	^{[k]}
46	"The Last Time"	Louis Armstrong and His Hot Five	Ewing, Martin	Columbia	35838	W.81317-A	9/6/1927	Chicago	^{[k]}
47	"Struttin' With Some Barbecue"	Louis Armstrong and His Hot Five	Louis Armstrong	OKeh	8566	W.82037-B	12/9/1927	Chicago	^{[k]}
48	"Got No Blues"	Louis Armstrong and His Hot Five	Lil Hardin	OKeh	8551	W.82038-B	12/9/1927	Chicago	^{[k]}
49	"Once in a While"	Louis Armstrong and His Hot Five	William Butler	OKeh	8566	W.82039-B	12/10/1927	Chicago	^{[k]}
50	"I'm Not Rough"	Louis Armstrong and His Hot Five	Louis Lil Hardin Armstrong	OKeh	8551	W.82040-B	12/10/1927	Chicago	^{[k]}
51	"Hotter Than That"	Louis Armstrong and His Hot Five	Lil Hardin	OKeh	8535	W.82055-B	12/13/1927	Chicago	^{[l]}
52	"Savoy Blues"	Louis Armstrong and His Hot Five	Edward "Kid" Ory	OKeh	8535	W.82056-A	12/13/1927	Chicago	^{[l]}
1928 Hot Five recordings
53	"You're A Real Sweetheart"	Lillie Delk Christian with Louis Armstrong and His Hot Four	Caesar, Friend	OKeh	8607	400954-B	6/26/1928	Chicago	^{[m]}
54	"Too Busy"	Lillie Delk Christian with Louis Armstrong and His Hot Four	Coslow, Spier	OKeh	8596	400956-A	6/26/1928	Chicago	^{[m]}
55	"Was It A Dream"	Lillie Delk Christian with Louis Armstrong and His Hot Four	Miller, Cohn	OKeh	8596	400955-B	6/26/1928	Chicago	^{[m]}
56	"Last Night I Dreamed You Kissed Me"	Lillie Delk Christian with Louis Armstrong and His Hot Four	Kahn, Lombardo	OKeh	8607	400957-A	6/26/1928	Chicago	^{[m]}
57	"Fireworks"	Louis Armstrong and His Hot Five	Spencer Williams	OKeh	8597	W.400960-B	6/27/1928	Chicago	^{[n]}
58	"Skip the Gutter"	Louis Armstrong and His Hot Five	S Williams	OKeh	8631	W.400961-A	6/27/1928	Chicago	^{[n]}
59	"A Monday Date"	Louis Armstrong and His Hot Five	Earl Hines	OKeh	8609	W.400962-B	6/27/1928	Chicago	^{[n]}
60	"Don't Jive Me"	Louis Armstrong and His Hot Five	Hardin	Columbia	36376	W.400966-C	6/28/1928	Chicago	^{[n]}
61	"West End Blues"	Louis Armstrong and His Hot Five	King Oliver, C Williams	OKeh	8597	W.400967-B	6/28/1928	Chicago	^{[n]}
62	"Sugar Foot Strut"	Louis Armstrong and His Hot Five	Pierce	OKeh	8609	W.400968-B	6/28/1928	Chicago	^{[n]}
63	"Two Deuces"	Louis Armstrong and His Hot Five	Lil Hardin	OKeh	8641	W.400973-B	6/29/1928	Chicago	^{[n]}
64	"Squeeze Me"	Louis Armstrong and His Hot Five	Waller, C Williams	OKeh	8641	W.400974-B	6/29/1928	Chicago	^{[n]}
65	"Knee Drops"	Louis Armstrong and His Hot Five	Lil Hardin	OKeh	8631	W.400991-B	7/5/1928	Chicago	^{[n]}
66	"No, Papa, No"	Louis Armstrong and His Orchestra	Spivey, Victoria	OKeh	8690	W.402513-A	12/4/1928	Chicago	^{[n]}
67	"Basin Street Blues"	Louis Armstrong and His Orchestra	Spencer Williams	OKeh	8690	W.402514-A	12/4/1928	Chicago	^{[n]}
68	"No One Else But You"	Louis Armstrong and His Savoy Ballroom Five	Don Redman	OKeh	8669	W.402168-B	12/5/1928	Chicago	^{[o]}
69	"Save It, Pretty Mama"	Louis Armstrong and His Savoy Ballroom Five	Don Redman, J. Davis, P. Dennicker	OKeh	8657	W.402170-C	12/5/1928	Chicago	^{[o]}
70	"Beau Koo Jack"	Louis Armstrong and His Savoy Ballroom Five	Hill, Armstrong, Milrose	OKeh	8680	W.402169-C	12/5/1928	Chicago	^{[o]}
71	"Weather Bird"	Louis Armstrong	Louis Armstrong	OKeh	41454	W.402199-A	12/5/1928	Chicago	^{[p]}
72	"Muggles"	Louis Armstrong and His Orchestra	Louis Armstrong	OKeh	8703	W.402200-B	12/7/1928	Chicago	^{[q]}
73	"Hear Me Talkin' To Ya"	Louis Armstrong and His Savoy Ballroom Five	Louis Armstrong	OKeh	8649	W.402224-A	12/12/1928	Chicago	^{[r]}
74	"St. James Infirmary"	Louis Armstrong and His Savoy Ballroom Five	J. Primrose	OKeh	8657	W.402225-A	12/12/1928	Chicago	^{[r]}
75	"Tight Like This"	Louis Armstrong and His Savoy Ballroom Five	Curl	OKeh	8649	W.402226-C	12/12/1928	Chicago	^{[r]}
N/A	"I'm Gonna Stomp, Mr. Henry Lee"	Louis Armstrong and His Orchestra	?	OKeh	Rejected	W.401688-A	3/5/1929	New York	^{[s]}
N/A	"I'm Gonna Stomp, Mr. Henry Lee"	Louis Armstrong and His Orchestra	?	OKeh	Rejected	W.401688-B	3/5/1929	New York	^{[s]}
76	"Knockin' A Jug"	Louis Armstrong and His Orchestra	Louis Armstrong, Eddie Condon	OKeh	8703	W.401689-B	3/5/1929	New York	^{[s]}
77	"I Can't Give You Anything But Love" (common take)	Louis Armstrong and His Savoy Ballroom Five	Dorothy Fields, Jimmy McHugh	OKeh	8669	W.401690-C	3/5/1929	New York	^{[t]}
78	"I Can't Give You Anything But Love" (alternate take)	Louis Armstrong and His Savoy Ballroom Five	Dorothy Fields, Jimmy McHugh	OKeh	8669	W.401690-C	3/5/1929	New York	^{[t]}
79	"Mahogany Hall Stomp"	Louis Armstrong and His Savoy Ballroom Five	Williams, Spencer	OKeh	8680	W.401691-B	3/5/1929	New York	^{[t]}

== Personnel ==
=== 1925–1926 Hot Five recordings ===
==== Tracks 1–6 ====
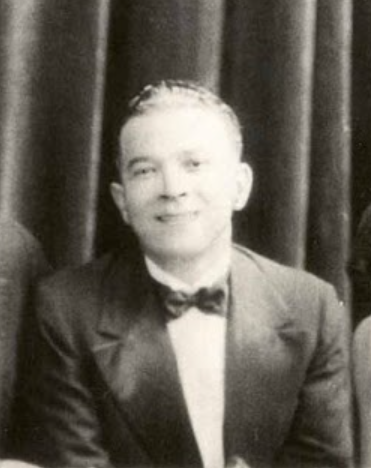
Trombonist Kid Ory in 1925

- Hociel Thomas (voice)
- Louis Armstrong (cornet)
- Johnny Dodds (clarinet)
- Hersal Thomas (piano)
- Johnny St. Cyr (banjo)

==== Tracks 7–20 ====
- Louis Armstrong (cornet)
- Kid Ory (trombone)
- Johnny Dodds (clarinet)
- Lil Hardin Armstrong (piano)
- Johnny St. Cyr (banjo)

==== Track 21 ====
- Joe and Susie Edwards (Butterbeans and Susie) (voice)
- Louis Armstrong (cornet)
- Kid Ory (trombone)
- Johnny Dodds (clarinet)
- Lil Hardin Armstrong (piano)
- Johnny St. Cyr (banjo)

==== Tracks 22–25 ====
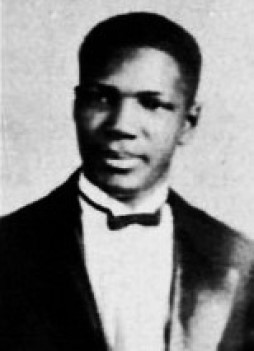
- Banjoist Johnny St. Cyr in 1919
  Clarence Babcock (voice)
- Louis Armstrong (cornet, voice)
- Kid Ory (trombone)
- Johnny Dodds (clarinet)
- Lil Hardin Armstrong (piano)
- Johnny St. Cyr (banjo)

==== Tracks 26–27 ====
- Louis Armstrong (cornet, voice)
- Kid Ory (trombone)
- Johnny Dodds (clarinet)
- Lil Hardin Armstrong (piano)
- Johnny St. Cyr (banjo)

==== Tracks 28–29 ====
- May Alix (voice)
- Louis Armstrong (cornet, voice)
- Kid Ory (trombone)
- Johnny Dodds (clarinet)
- Lil Hardin Armstrong (piano)
- Johnny St. Cyr (banjo)

==== Tracks 30–31 ====
- Louis Armstrong (cornet, voice)
- Henry Clark (trombone)
- Johnny Dodds (clarinet)
- Lil Hardin Armstrong (piano)
- Johnny St. Cyr (banjo)

=== 1927 Hot Seven recordings ===
==== Tracks 32–33 ====
- Louis Armstrong (cornet)
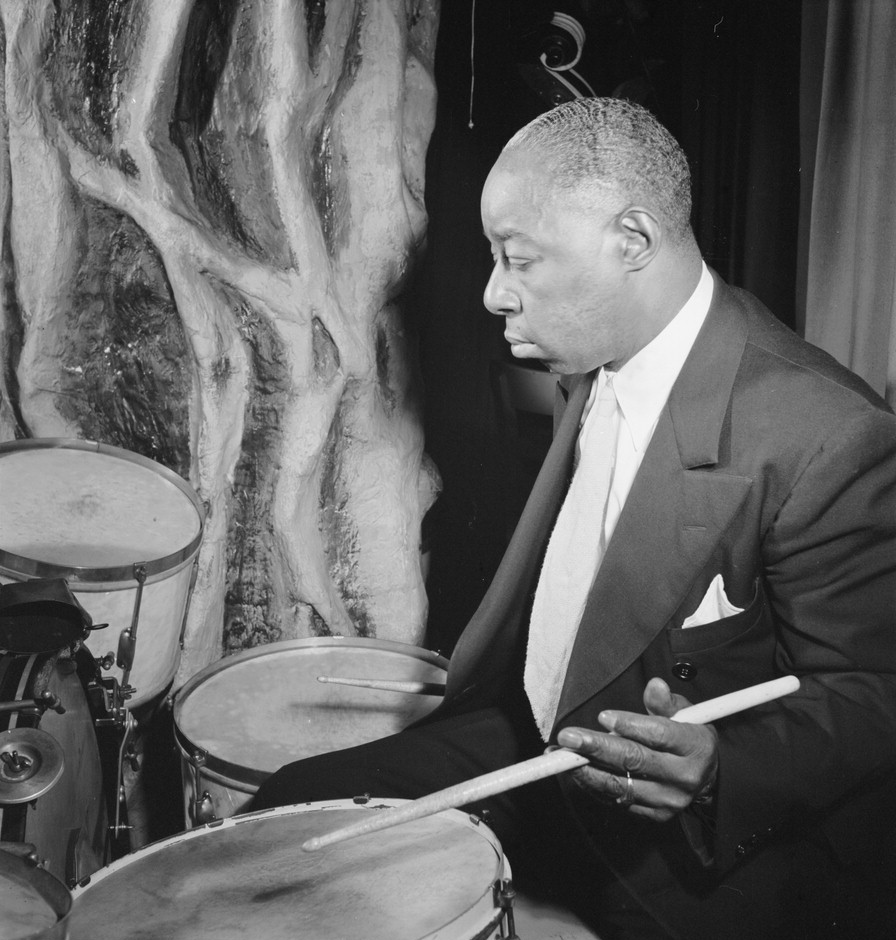
  Baby Dodds, Ole South, New York, ca. December 1946
- John Thomas (trombone)
- Johnny Dodds (clarinet)
- Lil Hardin Armstrong (piano)
- Johnny St. Cyr (banjo)
- Pete Briggs (tuba)
- Baby Dodds (drums)

==== Track 34 ====
- Louis Armstrong (cornet)
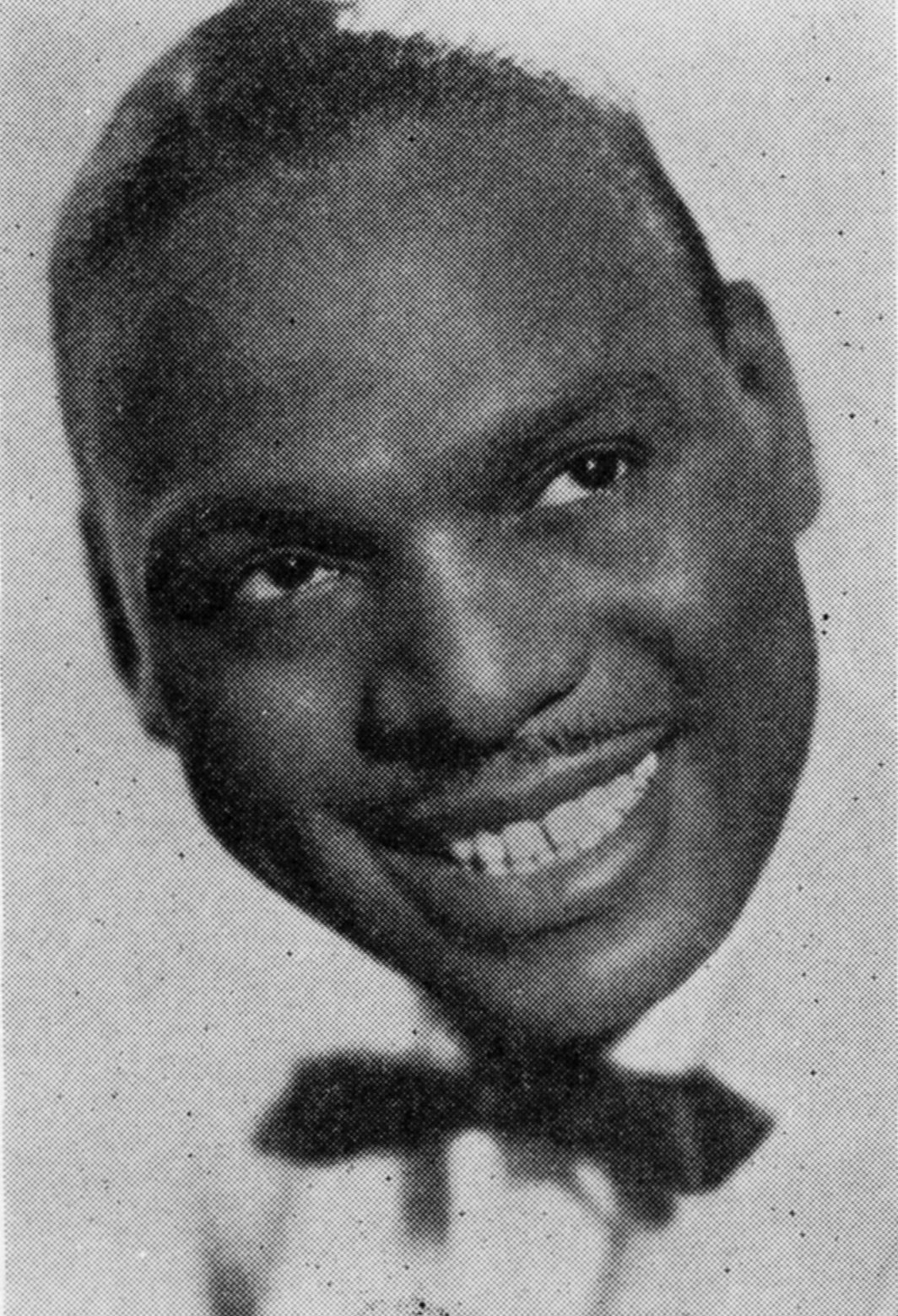
  Earl Hines in 1936
- Bill Wilson (cornet)
- Honoré Dutrey (trombone)
- Boyd Atkins (clarinet, alto saxophone, soprano saxophone)
- Joe Walker (alto saxophone, baritone saxophone)
- Albert Washington (tenor saxophone)
- Earl Hines (piano)
- Rip Bassett (banjo, guitar)
- Pete Briggs (tuba)
- Tubby Hall (drums)

==== Tracks 35–43 ====
- Louis Armstrong (cornet)
- John Thomas (trombone)
- Johnny Dodds (clarinet)
- Lil Hardin Armstrong (piano)
- Johnny St. Cyr (banjo, guitar)
- Pete Briggs (tuba)
- Baby Dodds (drums)

=== 1927 Hot Five recordings ===
==== Tracks 44–50 ====
- Louis Armstrong (cornet)
- Kid Ory (trombone)
- Johnny Dodds (clarinet)
- Lil Hardin Armstrong (piano)
- Johnny St. Cyr (banjo, guitar)

==== Tracks 51–52 ====
- Louis Armstrong (cornet, voice)
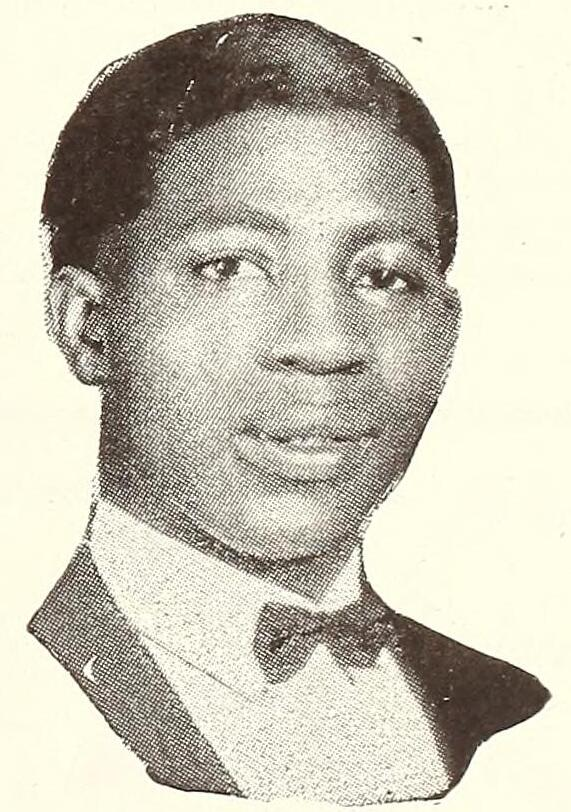
  Guitarist Lonnie Johnson in 1926
- Kid Ory (trombone)
- Johnny Dodds (clarinet)
- Lil Hardin Armstrong (piano)
- Johnny St. Cyr (banjo, guitar)
- Lonnie Johnson (guitar)

=== 1928 Hot Five recordings ===
==== Tracks 53–56 ====
- Lillie Delk Christian (voice)
- Louis Armstrong (trumpet)
- Jimmy Noone (clarinet)
- Earl Hines (piano)
- Mancy Carr (banjo)

==== Tracks 57–67 ====
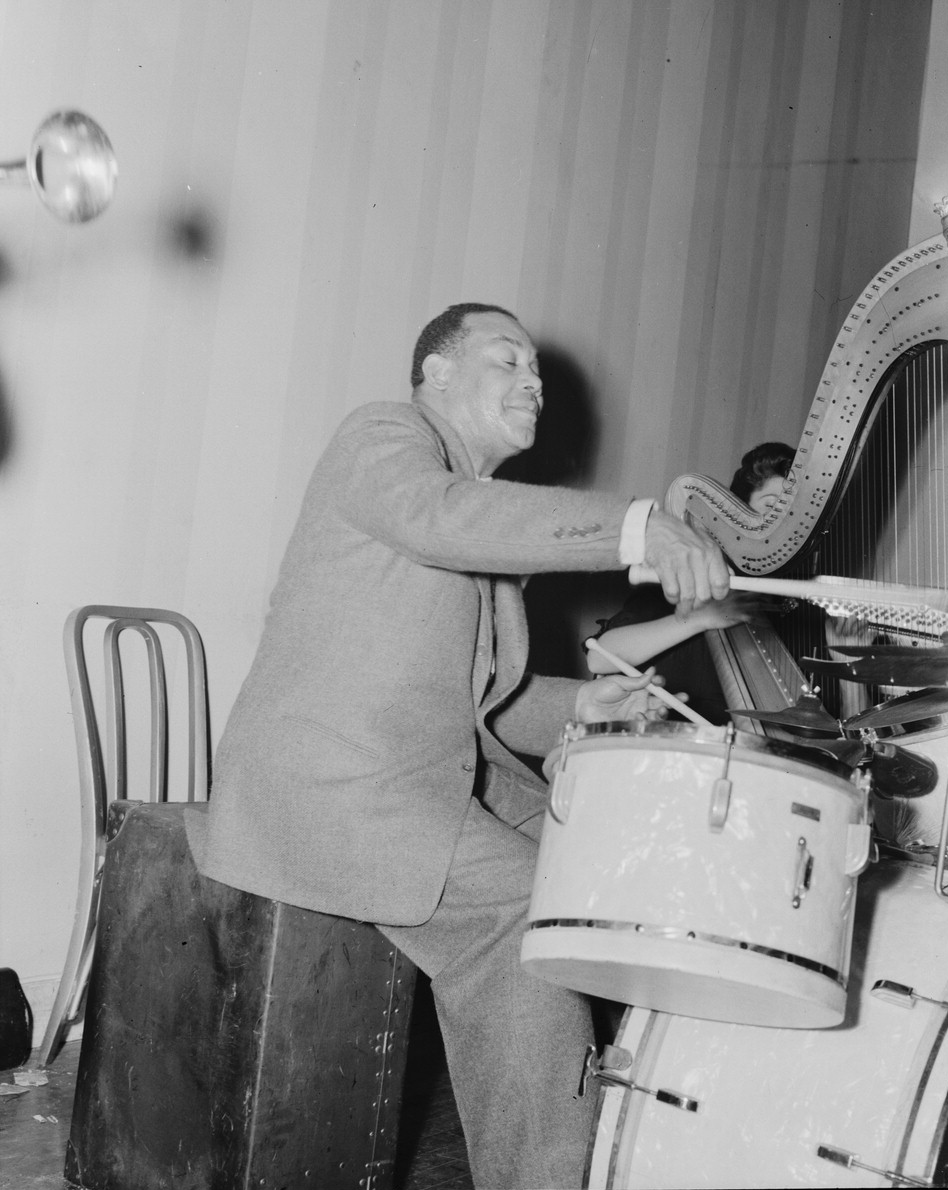
- Zutty Singleton with Adele Girard on harp in 1939; photo: William P. Gottlieb
  Louis Armstrong (trumpet, voice)
- Fred Robinson (trombone)
- Jimmy Strong (clarinet, tenor saxophone)
- Earl Hines (piano)
- Mancy Carr (banjo)
- Zutty Singleton (drums)

==== Tracks 68–70 ====
- Louis Armstrong (trumpet, voice)
- Fred Robinson (trombone)
- Jimmy Strong (tenor saxophone, clarinet)
- Don Redman (clarinet, alto saxophone)
- Earl Hines (piano)
- Dave Wilborn (banjo, guitar)
- Zutty Singleton (drums)

==== Track 71 ====
- Louis Armstrong (trumpet)
- Earl Hines (piano)

==== Track 72 ====
- Louis Armstrong (trumpet)
- Fred Robinson (trombone)
- Jimmy Strong (clarinet)
- Earl Hines (piano)
- Mancy Carr (banjo)
- Zutty Singleton (drums)

==== Tracks 73–75 ====
- Louis Armstrong (trumpet, voice)
- Fred Robinson (trombone)
- Jimmy Strong (clarinet, tenor saxophone)
- Don Redman (clarinet, alto saxophone)
- Earl Hines (piano)
- Mancy Carr (banjo)
- Zutty Singleton (drums)

==== Track 76 ====
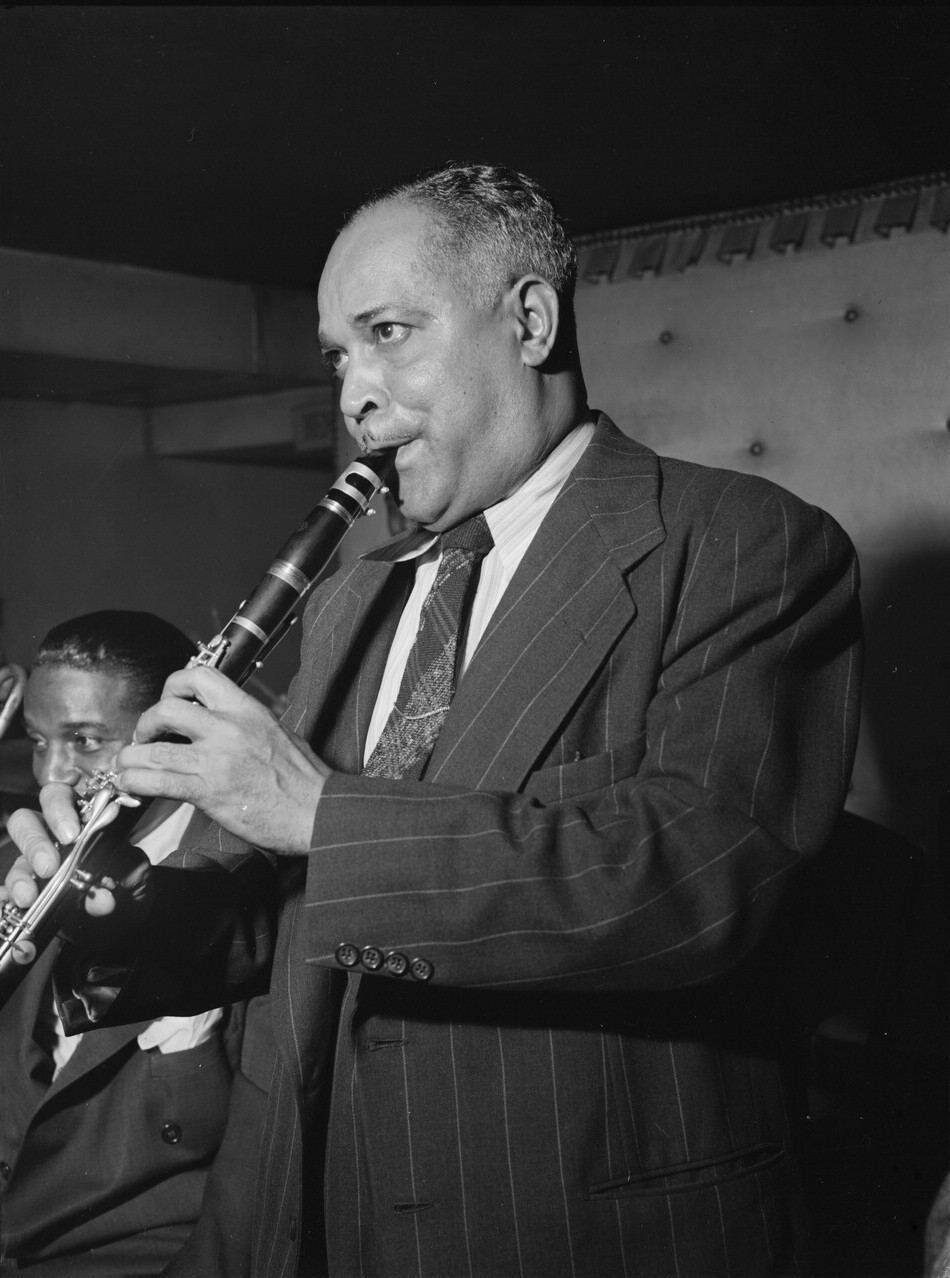
- Albert Nicholas, Jimmy Ryan's (Club), New York, ca. March 1947
  Louis Armstrong (trumpet)
- Jack Teagarden (trombone)
- Happy Caldwell (tenor saxophone)
- Joe Sullivan (piano)
- Eddie Lang (guitar)
- Kaiser Marshall (drums)

==== Tracks 77–79 ====
- Louis Armstrong (trumpet, voice)
- J.C. Higginbotham (trombone)
- Albert Nicholas (alto saxophone)
- Charlie Holmes (alto saxophone)
- Teddy Hill (tenor saxophone)
- Luis Russell (piano)
- Eddie Condon (banjo)
- Lonnie Johnson (guitar)
- Pops Foster (bass)
- Paul Barbarin (drums)

== See also ==
- Hot Fives & Sevens, a box set comprising these sessions
