= Johnny St. Cyr =

American jazz banjoist and guitarist (1890–1966)

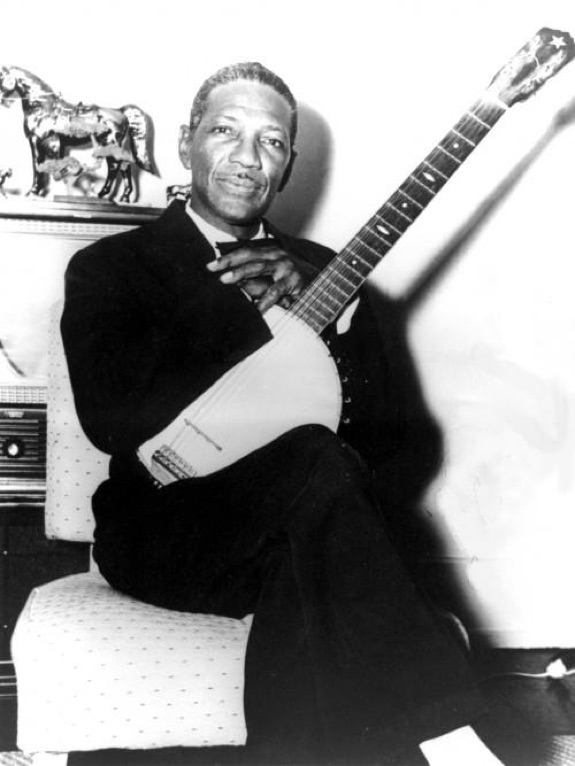
- Johnny St Cyr (ca. 1919)

Background information
- Born: John Alexander St. Cyr; April 17, 1890; New Orleans, U.S.
- Died: June 17, 1966 (aged 76) Los Angeles, U.S.
- Genres: Jazz
- Occupation: Musician
- Instruments: Banjo guitar, banjo, guitar
- Years active: 1904–1965
- Formerly of: King Oliver's Jazz Band; Louis Armstrong and His Hot Five; Jelly Roll Morton's Red Hot Peppers

Johnny St. Cyr (/ˈsɪər/) (April 17, 1890 – June 17, 1966) was an American jazz banjoist and guitarist. He was one of the original pioneers of jazz music, playing banjo and guitar in the bands of Louis Armstrong, King Oliver, Jelly Roll Morton, Johnny Dodds and Kid Ory, among others. He started the idea of banjo with jazz, a combination whose impact changed the banjo world during the Jazz years, and continues to have a marked affect. He is best known for writing the songs "Messin' Around", "Buddy's Habit", "High Fever" and "Oriental Strut", and for playing the banjo and/or guitar on the Louis Armstrong Hot Five and Hot Seven Sessions.

St. Cyr played a Martin guitar, a four-string tenor banjo, or a six-string banjo guitar, making his own instrument by attaching the neck of a guitar to a banjo. The result was a louder banjo with a jazz tone; his sound is notably different from other banjo music recorded in that era. He used a hard, thick pick to produce the smooth rhythm guitar sound and hard, clean single string lines that typified his style–he made his own picks from toothbrush handles.

A hard-working, selfless bandsman, St. Cyr had a professional, simple outlook on musicianship: “A jazz musician has to be a working class of a man, out in the open all the time, healthy and strong," he commented. "Playing music for him is just relaxing. He gets as much kick out of playing as other folks get out of dancing. The more enthusiastic his audience is, the more spirit the working man’s got to play.”

== Early life ==
Johnny St Cyr was born and raised in New Orleans. His parents separated when he was an infant and his father, Jules Firmin St. Cyr, died in 1901, when Johnny was 11. Jules played the flute and guitar, and often played local dances with brass bands. His mother (name unknown) played guitar but she would not let Johnny play it, so he made his own, out of a cigar box, fishing line and various grades of thread. When he could play chords as well as his mother, she gave him her guitar.

Johnny was given formal lessons by friends of his brother, who would come to dinner every Sunday and bring a barrel of Consumers beer. By the time he was 14, St. Cyr was good enough that these friends, Jules Baptiste and Jackie Dowden, asked him to join them in a band. They named it after the beer, calling themselves The Consumers Band. With Baptiste and St Cyr on guitar, and Dowden on mandolin, they played the popular songs of the day. At the time, people hosted fish fries on Saturdays; they hired bands and sold tickets. The best bands attracted the most people and The Consumers Band drew the largest crowds.

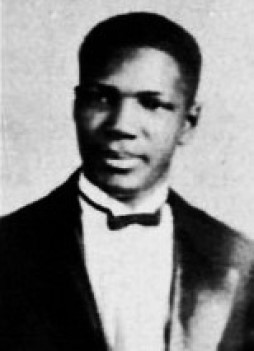
Johnny St. Cyr 1919

== Early career, New Orleans ==
In 1905, St. Cyr left school and was apprenticed to a journeyman plasterer (who, in 1907, had a son who would grow up to be the banjoist George Guesnon). By the time his apprenticeship was over, St. Cyr had saved enough money to be able to go to the dance halls, where he studied other musicians and became particularly interested in the Spanish guitar. He also met Martin ‘Big Manny’ Gabriel, an accordionist and cornet player who had started The National band with the clarinetist Wade Whaley. St. Cyr played with them for a few months, until his family moved downtown. There, he started hanging out at the shop of Piron and Paul Dominguez, barbers who were also formally trained violinists. In their shop, they kept a large collection of sheet music, to which they gave St. Cyr access. The barber shop was also the hub for local musicians—it’s where they got their calls to work. St. Cyr got to know Freddie Keppard, cornetist in the hottest band in New Orleans, the Olympia, whose members included Armand J. Piron, Kid Ory, Clarence Williams and Sydney Bechet. Keppard invited St. Cyr to join them, which was quite an honor; to the end of his life, St. Cyr regarded Keppard, Bechet and Louis Armstrong as the "three geniuses of jazz".

As St Cyr noted in his memoir, Jazz, As I Remember It, it was not until c 1915 that the New Orleans bands used the piano; the pianos of the day couldn’t reach the pitch of the brass instruments. Instead, bands used the violin, the instrument which would also take over when the cornet player needed to save his lip. Also at this time, there were no soloists—all songs were played with the full ensemble. And there were no singers. “The musicians, when asked to sing, would say, ‘No, we are musicians’,” recalls St. Cyr. “They’d think it was a disgrace to the profession.”

In 1912, as members of the Olympia went on tour, St. Cyr moved to the band of Papa Celestin, with which he did his first tour, through Louisiana, with John Rucker’s Minstrel Show. When Celestin moved full-time to the Tuxedo Dance Hall, St. Cyr played with the bands of Armand J. Piron (1914), pianist Arthur Campbell (1915) and, in 1916, King Oliver’s Magnolia Band, which consisted of Johnny Dodds, Ernest Kelly, Pops Foster and Henry Zeno. When Oliver landed a full-time job at Pete Lala’s Café, St. Cyr and Dodds moved to Kid Ory’s band, which also included Mutt Carey and Jimmie Noone.

At the time, there were constant personnel changes among New Orleans bands, as musicians were in several bands simultaneously. There was enormous demand for bands, which played in private homes, at picnics, on horse-drawn carts, in bordellos, at dance halls, and at every conceivable occasion, including grand balls, parades, weddings and funerals. Musicians earned one or two dollars a night, and it was common for clients to pay one person for the evening, and for that person to keep all of the money. So musicians had day jobs, and they were over-worked and under-paid.

It was when King Oliver wanted to take a break from his job at Pete Lala’s that he told St. Cyr that he needed to find a replacement. St. Cyr’s brother was a friend of Louis Armstong’s mother; St. Cyr had heard him play, and was also impressed by how tidy and polite he was. He recommended him, Armstrong learned Oliver’s repertoire in three days and went on to wow the audiences at Pete Lala’s.

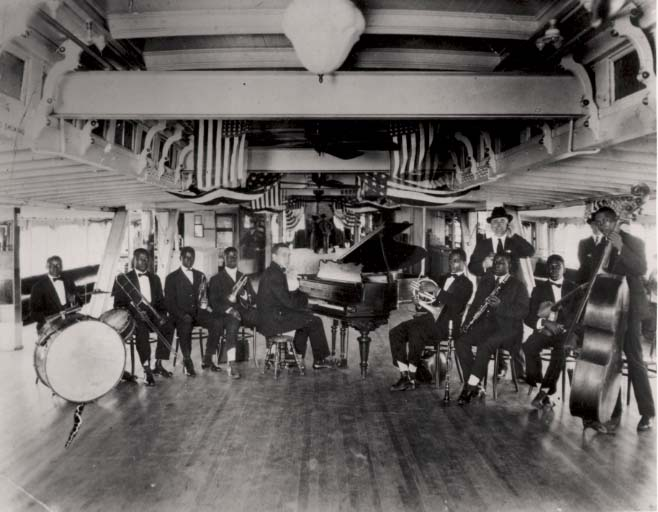
Fate Marable's New Orleans Band on the S.S. Sidney., 1919.

== The riverboats ==
In 1917, Streckfus Steamers hired bandleader Fate Marable to recruit bands for its riverboat excursions. For the 221-foot sternwheeler SS Sidney, Marable recruited Armstrong, St. Cyr, Baby Dodds and Pops Foster, among others. That band played the Sidney until she was damaged in a storm; in 1920, Marable formed a new band for the Capitol, an old sternwheeler that plied the Upper Mississippi in the winter months. This new band included Marable, Armstrong, St. Cyr, Dodds, Boyd Atkins, Norman Brashear, David Jones, Joe Howard, Sam Dutrey, Babe Ridgley and Henry Kimball Hadley. Streckus then arranged for the band to go to St. Louis for the summer season, to play on the steamer St. Paul. Every riverboat has its own band, but the St. Paul band was particularly good. All of its musicians were well-known in New Orleans but, in St. Louis, the band was a sensation—every day, the docks were packed with people waiting to hear them play.

As St. Cyr recalled, Streckfus had all of the music publishers send new songs every week. The band had no arranger; the songs were played as they were written, which made the band sound more like a swing band than a New Orleans band. Every week, they had two hours to learn a new set. In St. Louis, they joined the Musician’s Union. In their first year, they worked from 9:00 a.m. to 6:00 p.m., then from 8:00 p.m. until midnight. They were provided with room and board, but everyone preferred to stayed on shore. In their first year, the band members were paid $35.00 a week; in their second, the union made Streckfus hire a separate daytime band and raise each man's pay to $52.50 a week. It was in St. Louis that St. Cyr bought the four-string banjo used on all of the music he would record with Louis Armstrong and His Hot Five—the banjo had been pawned to a pool room owner. St. Cyr bought it for $20.00 and played it for the rest of his life.

Working on the riverboats meant that St. Cyr had given up his day job but, in the fall of 1921, he left the riverboats for good, went back to work as a plasterer, got married and built his own house. He took up the tenor horn and started playing on week-ends at the Pythian Temple Roof Garden. But, in the summer of 1923, King Oliver asked him to come to Chicago; Oliver was about to start recording music and wanted St. Cyr's banjo on the recordings. St. Cyr was reluctant but many of his friends were there and he accepted the offer, although he bought a return ticket.

== Chicago ==
St. Cyr moved to Chicago in September 1923, initially living with Oliver, then moving in with Louis Armstrong and Lil Hardin. After the recordings with King Oliver’s Jazz Band, for which he was paid $150.00, he moved to Darnell Howard’s band. Doc Cook’s Dreamland Orchestra was the house band at Harmon’s Dreamland Ballroom. St. Cyr joined in 1924 and stayed with Cook until 1929. Cook’s clarinetist, Jimmie Noone, had an after-hours job at the black-and-tan Edelweiss Club; Cook’s band finished at 12:30 a.m., after which Noone and St. Cyr would go to the Edelweiss and play with Noone’s band, which included Joe Poston, Earl Hines and Johnny Wells. In 1926, The Jimmie Noone Orchestra was hired full-time by the Apex Club and the band became Jimmie Noone's Apex Club Orchestra.

In his memoir, St. Cyr recalls that Cook was the first bandleader he’d known who worked with written jazz arrangements, saying “He could write music as fast I as could write a letter”. He also noted that the New Orleans musicians who were doing well in Chicago–men like Cook, Oliver, Noone and Johnny Dodds, were “all business”, focused on recording and holding full-time club jobs. Others spent their days at the Musicians Union Hall, where musicians played cards and pool and waited to be called upon by bandleaders or club owners. St. Cyr spent a lot of time there, usually with his best friend, Freddie Keppard. Keppard had a reputation for being difficult to get along with, and his alcoholism had taken hold at this point, but St. Cyr called him “a brilliant jazz musician, and a real pace-setter, who started reading and interpreting violin music before anyone else in New Orleans”. The only difference between Keppard and Armstrong, St. Cyr said, was that “Music was Louis’ whole life. For Freddie, it was just the way he earned a living.” There were times when St. Cyr was playing around the clock, often with orchestra pit bands such as Dave Peyton’s Orchestra, Erskine Tate’s Vendome Orchestra and Charlie Elgar’s band. He also played in one-night gigging bands, including Willie and Lottie Hightower’s Nighthawks. When he had time, he would go to Melrose Brothers Music Store, which was the hang-out of musicians who didn’t like the Union Hall, including Honore Dutrey, Kid Ory, Richard M. Jones and Jelly Roll Morton. St. Cyr had known Morton slightly in New Orleans; here, they re-connected and Jelly Roll went on to hire St. Cyr for several recordings. By the time St. Cyr became Louis Armstrong’s banjo player, and he was one of the most well-known musicians in the city.

In the summer months, Doc Cook’s band played amusement parks—Riverview Park and White City. Cook had just wrapped his 1929 summer season and was preparing to return to the Dreamland Ballroom when the Wall Street Crash occurred. Hundreds of musicians were instantly unemployed, including St. Cyr, who found himself accompanying an Italian singer, playing rural clubs and passing the hat at a dog track. In January 1930, he returned to New Orleans.

== Later career ==
St. Cyr worked as a plasterer throughout the 1930s and 1940s, playing music part-time, in the bands of Paul Barbarin and Alphonse Picou. In the late 1940s, the record companies started re-issuing the early jazz classics of Oliver, Morton and Armstrong, among others. This sparked a revival of the popularity of New Orleans jazz, marketed as “Dixieland” music, and New Orleans musicians started recording again.

St. Cyr came fully out of retirement. In 1949, he recorded with Big Eye Nelson, Albert Burbank, Wooden Joe Nicholas and Herb Morand. With Barbarin, Joe Avery, Thomas Jefferson, Willie Humphrey and Jeanette Kimball, he formed the band Johnny St Cyr and His Hot Five. In 1951, he won the ‘All-Time All-Star Banjoist’ poll conducted by The Record Changer magazine. In 1954, he recorded his first album, under his own name.

In 1955, Disneyland introduced Disney riverboats, paddle steamers which were exact replicas of the old-time Mississippi excursion riverboats. The first to launch, in July 1955, was the Mark Twain. Disneyland offered St. Cyr the job of providing the music for the excursions and, in early 1955, he moved to Los Angeles. He put together a band called the Young Men of New Orleans, which included Kid Ory, Mike DeLay, Polo Barnes, Harvey Brooks, Alton Redd and Barney Bigard. Disneyland also hosted Jazz Nights; for this, St. Cyr formed the New Orleans Creole Jazz Band. He also performed concerts with the New Orleans All Stars and hosted musicians at his home on S. Wall St. for weekly "South Wall Street Barefoot Philharmonic" jam sessions.

St. Cyr would keep the Disneyland job for the rest of his life; in 1961, Louis Armstrong and Monette Moore joined one of the cruises. The short concert, which was captured on film, saw Armstrong and Ory play together for the first time in 40 years. It also launched “Dixieland at Disneyland”, an annual event which continued to 1970.

== Personal life and death ==
St. Cyr was married to Letice Rosemal from 1921 until her death in 1959. They are known to have had at least one daughter. He died of leukemia, in Los Angeles, in 1966.

In 2002, St. Cyr was inducted into the American Banjo Museum Hall of Fame.

== Discography ==
- Phonograph Records, 78 RPM Shellac, two songs per disc

Band	Song	Writer/s	
King Oliver And His Creole Jazz Band, 1923	“When You Leave Me Alone to Pine”	Lil Hardin	Recorded: Gennett Studios, Richmond IN
	"Alligator Hop"	King Oliver, Alphonse Picou	Gennett Studios
	“That Sweet Something, Dear”	Kid Ory, Ruth Lee	Gennett Studios
	"Zulus Ball"	Jim Robinson, King Oliver	Gennett Studios
	"Working Man Blues"	King Oliver	Gennett Studios
	"Someday Sweetheart"	John Spikes, Reb Spikes	Gennett Studios
	"Krooked Blues"	Dink Johnson, Reb Spikes	Gennett Studios
	"If You Want My Heart (You Got to ‘Low it Babe)"	George Jean Marie, P. W. Beaulieu	Gennett Studios
King Oliver's Jazz Band, 1923	"Chattanooga Stomp"	Alphonse Picou	Recorded: Lincoln Gardens, Chicago
	"Junkman Blues"	King Oliver	Lincoln Gardens
	"London Cafe Blues"	Jelly Roll Morton	Lincoln Gardens
	"New Orleans Stomp"	Louis Armstrong, Lil Hardin	Lincoln Gardens
	"Camp Meeting Blues"	King Oliver	Lincoln Gardens
	"Buddy's Habit"	Arnett Nelson	Lincoln Gardens
	"Tears"	Louis Armstrong, Lil Hardin	Lincoln Gardens
	"Room Rent Blues"	Irving Newton	Lincoln Gardens
	"I Ain't Gonna Tell Nobody"	Richard M. Jones	Lincoln Gardens
Doc Cook and His Dreamland Orchestra, 1924	"So This is Venice!"	Ambroise Thomas, Grant Clarke	Gennett Studios
	"The One I Love (Belongs to Somebody Else)"	Isham Jones, Gus Kahn	Gennett Studios
	"Scissor Grinder Joe"	Haven Gillespie, S.T. Stocco	Gennett Studios
	"The Memphis Maybe Man"	Billy Moll, Haven Gillespie, Doc Cook	Gennett Studios
	"Lonely Little Wallflower"	Gus Kahn, Seymour Simons	Gennett Studios
	"Moanful Man"	Haven Gillespie, Doc Cook, Willie Baker	Gennett Studios
	"Brown Sugar"	Harry Barris	Gennett Studios
Louis Armstrong's Jazz Four, Chicago 1925	"Gambler's Dream"	Hociel Thomas	Vocals: Hociel Thomas
	"Sunshine Baby"	Hociel Thomas	Vocals: Hociel Thomas
	"Adam and Eve Had the Blues"	Hociel Thomas	Vocals: Hociel Thomas
	"Put It Where I Can Get It"	Hociel Thomas	Vocals: Hociel Thomas
	"Wash Woman Blues"	Hociel Thomas	Vocals: Hociel Thomas
	"I've Stopped My Man"	Hociel Thomas	Vocals: Hociel Thomas
Richard M. Jones' Three Jazz Wizards (aka The Chicago Hottentots), 1925	"All Night Shags"	Richard M. Jones	Featuring pianist Luis Russell
	"Put Me In The Alley Blues"	Richard M. Jones	Featuring pianist Luis Russell
	"29th and Dearborn"	Richard M. Jones	
	"New Orleans Shag"	Richard M. Jones	
	"Wonderful Dream"	Richard M. Jones	Vocals: Richard M. Jones
	"Spanish Mama"	Elmer Schoebel, Billy Meyers	
	"Panama Limited Blues"	Richard M. Jones	Vocals: Bertha Hill
	"Street Walker Blues"	Traditional	Vocals: Bertha Hill
	"Do Dirty Blues"	Richard M. Jones	Vocals: Bertha Hill
	"Sport Model Mama"	Victoria Spivey	Vocals: Bertha Hill
	"Leavenworth Blues"	Boyd Atkins	Vocals: Bertha Hill
Preston Jackson's Uptown Band, 1926	"Houston Bound"	Elzadie Robinson	Vocals: Elzadie Robinson
	"You Ain't The Last Man"	Elzadie Robinson	Vocals: Elzadie Robinson
Elzadie Robinson	"Love Crazy Blues"	Elzadie Robinson	Vocals: Elzadie Robinson
Wilmer Davis, Chicago 1926	"Rest Your Hips"	George Washington Thomas	
	"Gut Struggle"	George Washington Thomas	
Louis Armstrong and His Hot Five, Chicago 1926	"Gut Bucket Blues"	Louis Armstrong	
	"My Heart"	Lil Hardin	
	"Yes! I'm In the Barrel"	Louis Armstrong	
	"Come Back Sweet Papa"	Paul Barbarin, Luis Russell	
	"Georgia Grind"	Spencer Williams	Vocals: Louis Armstrong, Lil Hardin
	"Heebie Jeebies"	Boyd Atkins	Vocals: Louis Armstrong, Kid Ory
	"He Likes It Slow"	Butterbeans and Susie	With Butterbeans and Susie
	"Cornet Chop Suey"	Louis Armstrong	
	"Oriental Strut"	Johnny St. Cyr	
	"You're Next"	Louis Armstrong	
	"Muskrat Ramble"	Kid Ory, Ray Gilbert	
	"Don't Forget to Mess Around"	Louis Armstrong, Paul Barbarin	Vocals: Louis Armstrong
	"I'm Gonna Gitcha"	Lil Hardin	Vocals: Louis Armstrong
	"Droppin' Shucks"	Lil Hardin	Vocals: Louis Armstrong
	"Who' Sit"	Richard M. Jones	
	"King of the Zulus"	Lil Hardin	Vocals: Louis Armstrong, Lil Hardin, Clarence Babcock
	"Big Fat Ma and Skinny Pa"	Richard M. Jones	Vocals: Louis Armstrong, Clarence Babcock
	"Lonesome Blues"	Lil Hardin	Vocals: Louis Armstrong
	"Sweet Little Papa"	Kid Ory	
	"Jazz Lips"	Lil Hardin, Louis Armstrong, Sid Robin	
	"Skid-Dat-De-Dat"	Lil Hardin	Vocals: Louis Armstrong
	"Big Butter and Egg Man"	Louis Armstrong, Percy Venable	Vocals: May Alix, Louis Armstrong
	"Sunset Cafe Stomp"	Louis Armstrong, Percy Venable	Vocals: May Alix
	"You Made Me Love You"	Louis Armstrong, Percy Venable	Vocals: Louis Armstrong
	"Irish Black Bottom"	Louis Armstrong, Percy Venable	Vocals: Louis Armstrong
	"Leave Mine Alone"	Louis Armstrong, Percy Venable	Vocals: Louis Armstrong
Lil's Hot Shots	"Georgia Bo-Bo"	Fats Waller, Jo Trent	1926
	"Drop That Sack"	Louis Armstrong	
The New Orleans Wanderers	"Too Tight"	Louis Armstrong	1926
	"Papa Dip"	Louis Armstrong	
	"Perdido Street Blues"	Lil Hardin	
	"Gate Mouth"	Louis Armstrong	
The New Orleans Bootblacks	"Flat Foot"	Louis Armstrong	1926
	"Mad Dog"	Louis Armstrong	
	"Mixed Salad"	Louis Armstrong	
	"I Can't Say"	Louis Armstrong	
Joe Candullo & His Everglades Orchestra, 1926	"Black Bottom"	Buddy DeSylva, Lew Brown, Ray Henderson	
	"Messin' Around"	Doc Cooke, Johnny St. Cyr	With the Imperial Dance Orchestra
	"Oh! If I Only Had You"	Cliff Friend, Gus Kahn	With the Imperial Dance Orchestra
Russell's Hot Six, 1926	"29th and Dearborn"	Richard M. Jones	
	"Sweet Mumtaz"	Luis Russell	
	"Panama Limited Blues"	Richard M. Jones	Vocals: Ada Brown
	"Ti Juana Man"	Richard M. Jones, Aletha Dickerson	Vocals: Ada Brown
Fess Williams & His Royal Flush Orchestra, 1926	"Messin' Around"	Doc Cooke, Johnny St. Cyr	
Jelly Roll Morton's Red Hot Peppers, Chicago 1926	"Black Bottom Stomp"	Jelly Roll Morton	Recorded: Webster Hotel, Chicago
	"The Chant"	Mel Stitzel	
	"Doctor Jazz Stomp"	King Oliver, Walter Melrose	
	"Jelly Roll Blues"	Jelly Roll Morton	
	"Dead Man Blues"	Jelly Roll Morton	
	"Sidewalk Blues"	Jelly Roll Morton	
	"Someday Sweetheart"	John Spikes, Reb Spikes	
	"Kansas City Stomp"	Jelly Roll Morton	
	"Jungle Blues"	Jelly Roll Morton, Louis Armstrong	
	"Billy Goat Stomp"	Jelly Roll Morton	
	"Hyena Stomp"	Jelly Roll Morton	
	"Wildman Blues"	Jelly Roll Morton	
	"Beale Street Blues"	Jelly Roll Morton	
	"Wolverine Blues"	Jelly Roll Morton	
	"The Pearls"	Jelly Roll Morton	
	"Memphis Shake"	Henry Clifford	With the Dixieland Jug Blowers
	"Mr. Jelly Lord"	Jelly Roll Morton	With the Dixieland Jug Blowers
	"Smoke-House Blues"	Charles Luke	
	"Steamboat Stomp"	Jelly Roll Morton	
	"Any Ice Today Lady?"	Pat Ballard	With Fred Waring & His Pennsylvanians
	"Grandpa's Spells"	Jelly Roll Morton	
	"Cannon Ball Blues"	Jelly Roll Morton, Marty Bloom	
Cookie's Gingersnaps, 1926	"Here Comes The Hot Tamale Man!"	Fred Rose, Charles Harrison	
	"High Fever"	Joe Sanders, Charles Harrison	
	"Love Found You For Me"	Clarence Williams, Doc Cook	Vocals: Jimmie Noone
	"Messin' Around"	Doc Cook, Johnny St. Cyr	
Luis Russell's Heebie Jeebie Stompers, 1926	"Dolly Mine"	Luis Russell, Paul Barbarin	
	"Plantations Joys"	Luis Russell	
	"Please Don't Turn Me Down"	Paul Barbarin	
	"Sweet Mumtaz"	Luis Russell	
Lillie Delk Christian, 1926-1927	"Lonesome and Sorry"	Benny Davis, Con Conrad	Vocals: Lillie Delk Christian
	"Baby O' Mine"	Richard M. Jones	Vocals: Lillie Delk Christian
	"Sweet Man"	Roy Turk, Maceo Pinkard	Vocals: Lillie Delk Christian
	"Sweet Georgia Brown"	Ben Bernie, Maceo Pinkard, Kenneth Casey	Vocals: Lillie Delk Christian
	"My Blue Heaven"	Walter Donaldson, George A. Whiting	Vocals: Lillie Delk Christian
	"Who's Wonderful, Who's Marvelous? Miss Annabelle Lee"	Lew Pollack, Sidney Clare	Vocals: Lillie Delk Christian
	"Ain't She Sweet"	Milton Ager, Jack Yellen	Vocals: Lillie Delk Christian
	"It All Depends On You"	Ray Henderson, Buddy DeSylva, Lew Brown	Vocals: Lillie Delk Christian
Doc Cook and his 14 Doctors of Syncopation, 1927	"Alligator Crawl"	Andy Razaf, Fats Waller, Joe Davis	
	"Brainstorm"	Joe Sanders	
	"Hum And Strum (Do, Do, Do, That's What I Do)"	Elmer Schoebel, Billy Meyers	
	"I Got Worry (Love Is On My Mind)"	Peter DeRose, Jo Trent	
	"Slue-Foot"	Joe Sanders, Arthur Lewis	
	"Willie The Weeper"	Grant Rymal, Marty Bloom, Walter Melrose	Vocals: Andrew Hilaire
Louis Armstrong and His Hot Seven, 1927	"Willie The Weeper"	Grant Rymal, Marty Bloom, Walter Melrose	
	"Wild Man Blues"	Jelly Roll Morton, Louis Armstrong	
	"Alligator Crawl"	Andy Razaf, Fats Waller, Joe Davis	
	"Potato Head Blues"	Louis Armstrong	
	"Melancholy Blues"	Marty Bloom, Walter Melrose	
	"Weary Blues"	Artie Matthews	
	"Twelfth Street Rag"	Euday L. Bowman	
	"Keyhole Blues"	Wesley Wilson	Vocals: Louis Armstrong
	"S.O.L. Blues"	Louis Armstrong	Vocals: Louis Armstrong
	"Gully Low Blues"	Louis Armstrong	Vocals: Louis Armstrong
	"That's When I'll Come Back To You"	Frank Biggs	Vocals – Louis Armstrong, Lil Hardin
Louis Armstrong & His Hot Five, 1927	"Put 'Em Down Blues"	Eloise Bennett	Vocals: Louis Armstrong
	"Ory's Creole Trombone"	Kid Ory	
	"The Last Time"	Sara Martin, Bill Ewing	Vocals: Louis Armstrong
	"Struttin' With Some Barbecue"	Lil Hardin	
	"Got No Blues"	Lil Hardin	
	"Once in a While"	William H. Butler	
	"I'm Not Rough"	Louis Armstong, Lil Hardin	Vocals: Louis Armstrong
	"Hotter Than That"	Lil Hardin	Vocals: Louis Armstrong
	"Savoy Blues"	Kid Ory	
Kid Brady's Clarinet Band, 1927	"Embarrassment Blues"	King Brady	
	"Lazybone Blues"	King Brady	
Wilton Crawley, 1927	"She's Nothing But Nice"	Wilton Crawley	
	"Crawley Clarinet Moan"	Wilton Crawley	
	"Love Will Drive Me Crazy"	Wilton Crawley	
	"Let's Pretend to be Sweethearts"	Wilton Crawley	
The Johnny Dodds' Black Bottom Stompers, 1927	"Joe Turner Blues"	Walter Hirsch, W.C. Handy	
	"When Erastus Plays His Old Kazoo"	Sam Coslow, Sammy Fain, Larry Spier	
	"Mandy Lee Blues"	Marty Bloom, Walter Melrose	
	"Tin Roof Blues"	Paul Mares, Ben Pollack, Mel Stitzel, George Brunies, Leon Roppolo	
	"Milenberg Joys"	Jelly Roll Morton, Paul Mares, Walter Melrose, Leon Roppolo	

=== Albums ===
- Wooden Joe Nicholas – Wooden Joe's New Orleans Band , 1945
- Big Eye Nelson – The 1949 Sessions / Live At Luthjens, 1949
- Herb Morand – Herb Morand 1949, 1949
- American Music by Albert Burbank and Big Eye Nelson, 1949
- Percy Humphrey – Percy Humphrey and His Sympathy Five, 1951
- Johnny St. Cyr And His Hot Five – Bye And Bye, 1954
- Paul Barbarin – Paul Barbarin and His Jazz Band, 1955
- Johnny St Cyr – Johnny St. Cyr, 1955
- The New Orleans All Stars – In Concert At The Dixieland Jubilee, 1955
- Raymond Burke – St. Louis Blues, c 1958

== See also ==
- American Banjo Museum Hall of Fame Members
