= Sunset Cafe =

Former jazz club in Chicago, Illinois

- The Grand Terrace Cafe; Grand Terrace
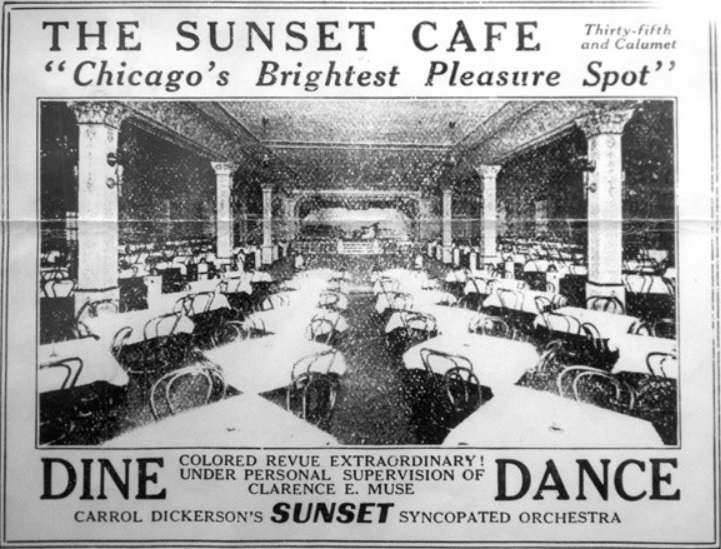
- A 1923 advertisement for the café
- Interactive map of Sunset Cafe
- Address: 315 E 35th St. Chicago, Illinois; United States
- Coordinates: 41.8309°N 87.6186°W
- Owner: Joe Glaser
- Type: Jazz club
- Event: Music

Construction
- Opened: 1921
- Closed: 1950; 76 years ago
- Years active: 1920s–1940s
- Architects: Alfred Schartz (1921); Sobel & Drielsma (1937)

The Sunset Cafe, also known as the Grand Terrace Cafe or simply Grand Terrace, was a jazz club in Chicago, Illinois, operating in the 1920s–1940s. It was one of the most important jazz clubs in the United States, especially between 1917 and 1928, when Chicago became a creative capital of jazz innovation and again during the emergence of bebop in the early 1940s. From its inception, the club was a rarity as a haven from segregation, since the Sunset Cafe was an integrated or Black and Tan club where African Americans, along with other ethnicities, could mingle freely with white Americans without much fear of reprisal. Many important musicians developed their careers at the Sunset/Grand Terrace Cafe.

== Original building ==
The building that housed the Cafe still stands at 315 E 35th St. in the Bronzeville neighborhood of Chicago. Originally built in 1909 as an automobile garage, after a 1921 remodeling by the architect Alfred Schartz, it was converted into a venue with around 100 tables, a bandstand, and dance floor. The building underwent another major remodeling in 1937, designed by the architectural firm Sobel & Drielsma, when it was renamed the Grand Terrace Cafe. It was listed on the National Register of Historic Places on April 30, 1986, as part of the Black Metropolis thematic nomination. On September 9, 1998, the building was officially designated a Chicago Landmark as one of the nine structures comprising the Black Metropolis–Bronzeville Historic District.

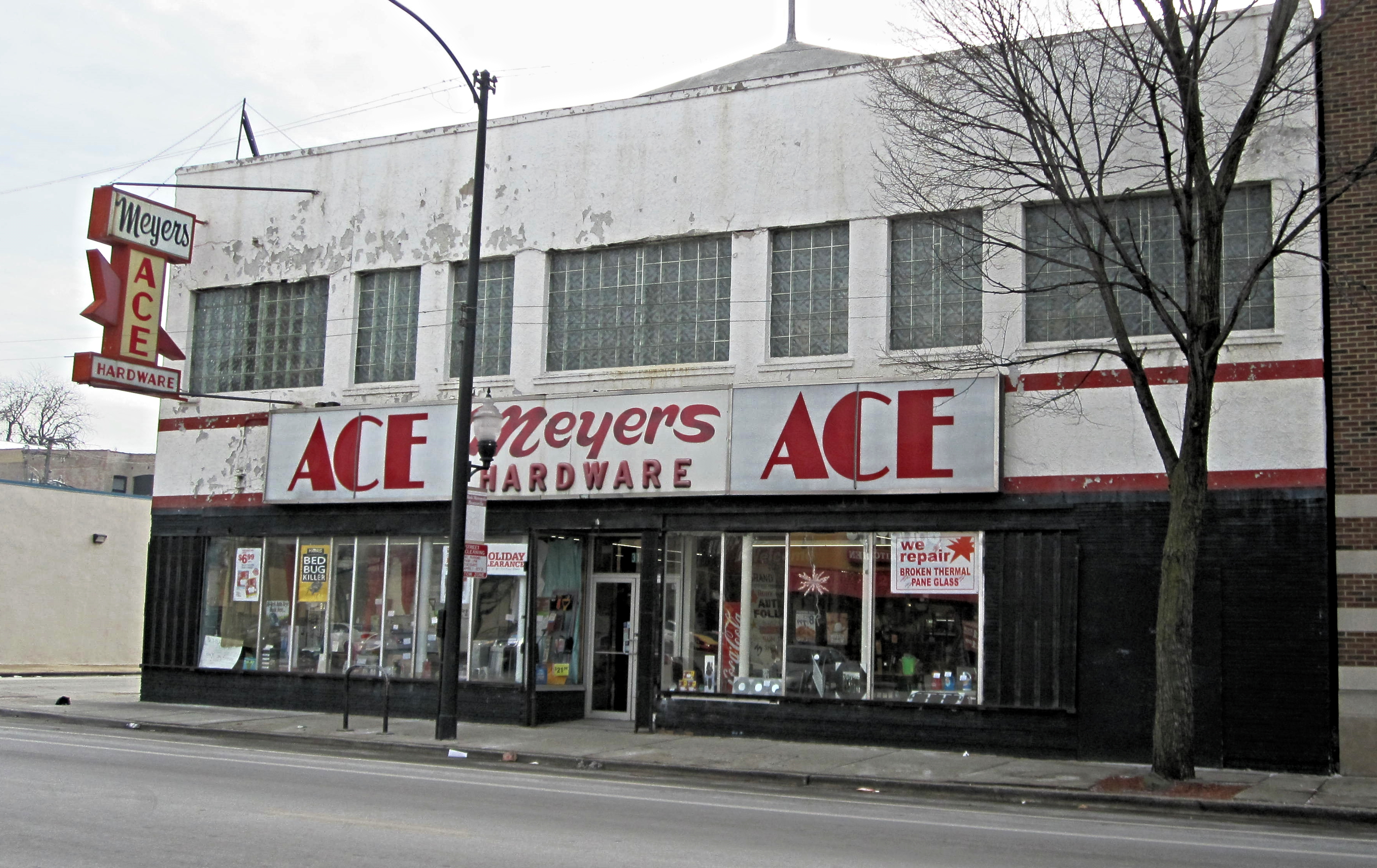
As of 2017, an Ace Hardware store occupies the building that was formerly the Sunset Cafe

While the historic structure that once housed New York's original Cotton Club was torn down decades ago for urban renewal, Chicago's original Sunset Cafe building still stands and retains some of its original murals on the walls. The Sunset Cafe building returned to its modest roots after the then-named–Grand Terrace Cafe closed in 1950, serving as a political office for a short time, and then as an Ace Hardware store.

== Famous performers ==
Owned by Louis Armstrong's manager, Joe Glaser, the venue played host to such performers as Louis Armstrong, Adelaide Hall, Billie Holiday, Dinah Washington, Fletcher Henderson, Cab Calloway, Lionel Hampton, Johnny Dodds, Bix Beiderbecke, Jimmy Dorsey, Benny Goodman, Woody Herman, Gene Krupa and Earl "Fatha" Hines and his orchestra's members: Billy Eckstine, Dizzy Gillespie, Charlie Parker and Sarah Vaughan. On September 23, 1939, Ella Fitzgerald made her Chicago debut on this famous stage.

== Louis Armstrong ==
Shortly after beginning to record his Hot Five records, Louis Armstrong began playing in the Carroll Dickerson Orchestra at the Sunset Cafe in 1926, with Earl Hines on piano. In July of that year, Percy Venable staged and produced Jazzmania, which had a finale with the whole cast supporting Armstrong as he sang "Heebie Jeebies". Venable would also later design a show with a "prime attraction", or Armstrong, singing "Big Butter and Egg Man" with Mae Alix. The band with Hines as musical director was soon renamed Louis Armstrong and his Stompers.

== Cab Calloway ==
Cab Calloway got his professional start onstage under Louis Armstrong at the Sunset Cafe. Calloway eventually became one of only a few big band leaders to come up under Armstrong, along with Earl Hines. When Louis departed the Cafe for New York, it was the young Cab Calloway, a 20-year-old "kid from Baltimore", whom Armstrong and Glaser picked to take over from Armstrong at the Sunset. A few years later, Calloway followed Armstrong to New York, and before long found himself headlining at the Cotton Club; back in Chicago, Hines inherited the Sunset Cafe mantle. In 1928, the 25-year-old Hines opened what was to become a twelve-year residency at what was now renamed the Grand Terrace Cafe – by now "controlled" (or 25% controlled) by Al Capone.

== Earl Hines ==
With Earl Hines as its bandleader, what used to be the Sunset Cafe continued its tradition, under Hines introducing Charlie Parker, Dizzy Gillespie, Sarah Vaughan, Nat King Cole, and Billy Eckstine, as well as the dancer Bill "Bojangles" Robinson. It was "live" from the Grand Terrace that the Hines Band became the most radio-broadcast band in America.
