= Vocal jazz =

Instrumental approach to jazz using the voice

Vocal jazz or jazz singing is a genre within jazz music where the voice is used as an instrument.

Vocal jazz began in the early twentieth century. Jazz music has its roots in blues and ragtime and can also traced back to the New Orleans jazz tradition. Jazz music is characterized by syncopated rhythms, improvisation, and unique tonality and pitch deviation. In vocal jazz, this includes vocal improvisations called scat singing where vocalists imitate the instrumentalist's tone and rhythm.

== History ==
Jazz singing originates from enslaved African-Americans who sang field hollers and work songs. Work songs and field hollers provided a mode of expression for enslaved people to challenge the oppressive structures of white power. They allowed emotional expression, helped pass the time, and coordinated labor movements. The musical elements of these songs involved a call-and-response structure and included repetitive phrasing and improvisation which are foundational elements of jazz music.

Spirituals in churches, minstrels, and vaudeville also were the basis for jazz music. Jazz grew into popularity in the early twentieth century, with its roots in blues.

Louis Armstrong is often cited as being a large contributor to the rise in popularity of vocal jazz music, beginning in the late 1920s. His 1926 recording of "Heebie Jeebies" is often cited as the first modern song to employ scatting, a vocal improvisation technique.

In the 1940s, jazz evolved into the bop era. Notable singers of this period were Ella Fitzgerald, Sarah Vaughan, Billie Holiday, and Dinah Washington who had all previously sung with big bands and developed their solo careers.

Alongside the rise of the more relaxed cool jazz in the 1950s, singers followed the same laid-back approach. This period gave rise to Peggy Lee, June Christy, Chris Connor, Helen Merrill, Chet Baker, Carmen McRae, Joe Williams, and Ray Charles.

== Vocal technique ==
Vocal jazz is characterized by vocal techniques such as pitch bending, inflections, consonant execution, and soft releases of vowels. In vocal jazz, compared to classical choral pedagogy there is less legato and ornamental use of vibrato. Jazz vocalists use more conversational pronunciation of words and shorter musical phrasing than in choral singing.

Jazz arrangements require great flexibility and the ability to use mixed-register singing techniques. Jazz singers usually sing in keys that fall in their middle to low registers. The microphone technique is a big part of vocal jazz singing, allowing vocalists to amplify their voices with certain phrases.

Most jazz singers use a rhythm section (piano, bass, drums, and guitar) and sometimes vocal percussion. Vocal jazz ensembles consist of multiple voices alongside instrumental accompaniment.

Vocal jazz repertoire typically includes music from the Great American Songbook. Popular music arrangements are often made for vocal jazz ensembles.

== See also ==
- American Jazz Singers
- Vocalese
- Scat singing
