= West End Blues =

Song performed by King Oliver

Instrumental by Joe "King" Oliver
- Released: 1928
- Recorded: June 11, 1928
- Genre: Jazz
- Label: Brunswick
- Composer: Joe "King" Oliver

"West End Blues" is a multi-strain twelve-bar blues composition by Joe "King" Oliver. It is most commonly performed as an instrumental, although it has lyrics added by Clarence Williams.

King Oliver and his Dixie Syncopators made the first recording for Brunswick Records on June 11, 1928. Clarence Williams later added lyrics to the instrumental tune. He recorded the song several times in 1928, first with vocalist Ethel Waters, then with Irene Mims, aka Hazel Smith (with King Oliver playing cornet), then again with Katherine Henderson.

The "West End" of the title refers to the westernmost point of Lake Pontchartrain within Orleans Parish, Louisiana; it was the last stop on the trolley line in New Orleans to the lake. In its heyday, it was a thriving summer resort with live music, dance pavilions, seafood restaurants, and lake bathing.

== Louis Armstrong's recording ==
"West End Blues"

Song by Louis Armstrong and His Hot Five
- Released: 1928
- Recorded: June 28, 1928
- Genre: Traditional jazz, blues
- Label: Okeh
- Composer: Joe "King" Oliver

By far the best known recording of "West End Blues" is the 3-minute-plus, 78 rpm recording made by Louis Armstrong and His Hot Five on June 28, 1928. Gunther Schuller devoted page after page to it in his book Early Jazz, writing, "The clarion call of 'West End Blues' served notice that jazz had the potential capacity to compete with the highest order of previously known musical expression." Gary Giddins wrote that this tune "came to symbolize more than any other the ascendancy of a classic American music."

Armstrong plays trumpet and sings, backed by a band including pianist Earl Hines, clarinetist Jimmy Strong, trombonist Fred Robinson, banjoist Mancy Carr and drummer Zutty Singleton on hand cymbals. Armstrong's unaccompanied opening cadenza is considered to be one of the defining moments of early jazz, incorporating a rhythmic freedom that anticipated many later musical developments. In addition, Lil Hardin Armstrong later explained that this introduction stemmed from trumpet exercise books that she and Louis had drilled. Also notable is Armstrong's tender scat vocal chorus in a duet with the clarinet in its low register played by Strong. Hines takes a "beautifully crafted" piano solo, which was praised as a "perfect... example of originality in harmony, phrases, and general style." The final chorus is dominated by a four-bar (12-second) high C (concert high B♭) played by Armstrong. The number is closed by the metallic click of drummer Zutty Singleton's cymbals.

This recording was inducted in the Grammy Hall of Fame in 1979. Billie Holiday cited listening to "West End Blues" as her first experience with scat-singing.

Armstrong recorded several later versions of "West End Blues", including for the 1947 film New Orleans and with his All Stars in the 40s.

== King Oliver's recordings ==
Joe "King" Oliver wrote "West End Blues", and was the first to record it on June 11, 1928, with his band The Dixie Syncopators. This recording established the basic form of the song that Armstrong's later recording followed. On January 16, 1929, Oliver recorded the song again, borrowing from the Hot Five arrangement, though at a quicker tempo. The opening trumpet cadenza (based heavily on Armstrong's 1928 recording) has frequently been incorrectly credited to Oliver, but was in fact played by trumpeter Louis Metcalf. Pianist Luis Russel also takes a solo, in turn basing it on Earl Hines' solo from the Hot Five recording.
