= Lillie Delk Christian =

Early 20th-century American jazz singer

- Born: Lillie Delk; Mobile, Alabama
- Genres: Jazz
- Occupation: Singer
- Instrument: Vocals
- Years active: 1926–c.1941
- Labels: Okeh
- Spouse: Charles Christian

Lillie Delk Christian (born Lillie Delk) was an early 20th-century American early-jazz singer and recording star.

== Early life ==
Lillie Delk was born, and spent her early years, in Mobile, Alabama. Born sometime after the turn of the twentieth century, Delk was very private about her birth year. The Delk family moved to Chicago, Illinois in 1915. There, she became an acquaintance with jazzman Johnny St. Cyr, who often heard the teenager singing at the boarding house he shared with the family on Indiana Street. She married Charles Christian sometime in the mid-1920s. Impressed with her voice, St. Cyr eventually introduced her to the vibrant Chicago jazz music scene and Okeh Records, the label to which he was then signed.

== Career ==
Christian signed with the Okeh label in 1927. Her jazz-pop singing style has been compared to her contemporaries, Ruth Etting and Annette Hanshaw. Some critics thought her voice to be brash and too brightly colored, but industry notables were not dissuaded from working closely with her. One modern critic on AllMusic exclaimed: "...Lillie Delk Christian sang gently and sweetly, employing a soft parlor vibrato that perfectly suited much of her pop-oriented repertoire..." During the height of her career, several of Chicago's top jazz musicians backed her in recording sessions. These included cornetist Louis Armstrong, pianist Richard M. Jones, pianist Earl Hines, and clarinetist / bandleader Jimmie Noone. Along with these notables, she also accompanied the likes of well known jazz artists of the day—St. Cyr, Artie Starks, and Mancy Carr—in regular live and studio performances. Mrs. Christian cut at least 16 releases for Okeh Records from late 1926 to 1928, eight of which were accompanying Armstrong. After a five-year hiatus from performing during the height of the Great Depression, she toured with Carroll Dickerson’s Orchestra in the mid-1930s. Other locations followed. In a 1961 interview, Christian recalls playing the Cotton Club; several stints at the Club De Lisa (one time with bandleader Red Saunders, and another time with Eddie Cole leading the band); and the Continental Club in Springfield, Ohio (featuring a White club-orchestra led by Horace Henderson).

== Discography ==
- I Must Have That Man! by Dorothy Fields / Jimmy McHugh
- I Can't Give You Anything But Love by Dorothy Fields / Jimmy McHugh
- Sweet Georgia Brown
- Too Busy feat. Louis Armstrong (Armstrong's free-form scatting on this cover has become widely known and broadcast.)
- Baby feat. Louis Armstrong
- Was It a Dream? feat. Louis Armstrong & His Hot Five
- You're a Real Sweetheart feat. Louis Armstrong & His Hot Five
- It All Depends on You written for the play, Big Boy; music by Ray Henderson and lyrics by Buddy G. DeSylva and Lew Brown
- Sweet Man
- Lonesome and Sorry
- My Blue Heaven,1928, by Donaldson and Whiting
- Sweethearts on Parade with Carmen Lombardo
- Last Night I Dreamed You Kissed Me by Gus Kahn / Carmen Lombardo
- Ain't She Sweet? feat. Richard M. Jones; by Milton Ager / Jack Yellen
- Who's Wonderful! Who's Marvelous? with Miss Annabelle Lee
- Last Night I Dreamed You Kissed Me with Hociel Thomas
