= May Alix =

American singer

- Born: Liza Mae Alix; August 31, 1902; Chicago, Illinois, U.S.
- Died: November 1, 1983 (aged 81)
- Genres: Jazz, cabaret
- Occupation: Singer
- Instrument: Vocals
- Label: Vocalion
- Formerly of: The Jimmie Noone band, Ollie Powers

Liza Mae "May" Alix (August 31, 1902 in Chicago, Illinois - November 1, 1983) was an American cabaret and jazz vocalist.

== Biography ==
She began her career as a teenager after winning a talent contest. She performed with the Jimmie Noone band in the clubs of Chicago. Alix later worked with bandleaders Carroll Dickerson, Duke Ellington, and Luis Russell. She earned the nickname "Queen of the Splits" for the dance choreography included in her show, where she would do a split for every dollar thrown by a customer. Soon she joined Ollie Powers as a duo performing in cabarets. In 1926, she recorded with Louis Armstrong and His Hot Five. One of the recordings, "Big Butter and Egg Man," which they performed at the Sunset Café as a duo, became Armstrong's first chart hit. The song "Big Butter and Egg Man," according to Thomas Brothers, included "an unspoken racial dimension, for part of the humor came from the dark-skinned cornetist acting the part of a big butter and egg man, who was, unquestionably, white in the popular imagination." When performing this number with Armstrong, according to Earl Hines, Alix would "put her arms around him, look at him and sing, 'I need a big butter and egg man,' and he [Armstrong] would stand there and almost melt." She collaborated with Jimmie Noone on half a dozen recordings for Vocalion Records (1929–1930) including "Ain't Misbehavin", "My Daddy Rocks Me", and "Birmingham Bertha/Am I Blue?". During the 1930s and early 1940s, she performed mainly in New York City.

She married and eventually divorced her pianist and songwriter husband, Warley Asher. She left show business in 1941.

Jazz singer Alberta Hunter sometimes recorded under the name "May Alix", with the permission of the real May Alix.
