= Otis Johnson (musician) =

American musician

Otis Johnson (January 13, 1908 – February 28, 1994) was an American jazz trumpeter.

== Life ==
Johnson was born on January 13, 1908 (some records have 1910) in Richmond, Virginia. He began his career in the late 1920s, working with Gene Rodgers, Henri Saparo, Eugene Kennedy, and Charlie Skeete. In 1929 he joined Luis Russell's band, and rejoined Kennedy's group before working with Benny Carter in 1934. He played with Charlie Turner and Willie Bryant in the mid-1930s, then with Louis Armstrong and Don Redman toward the end of the decade.

== Military service ==
Johnson joined the 369th Coast Artillery of the New York Army National Guard on December 30, 1940, and separated on October 13, 1945, achieving the rank of T/4. He never returned to active performance after leaving the military.

== Death ==
Johnson died on February 28, 1994.
