= Albert Burbank =

American jazz musician

Albert Burbank (March 25, 1902 – August 15, 1976) was an American, New Orleans–based clarinetist.

Born in New Orleans, Louisiana, United States, Burbank was taught clarinet by Lorenzo Tio, one of that city's most famous clarinet players. He stayed in the New Orleans area throughout the 1920s, playing wherever his services were needed. During the 1930s, he worked with Kid Milton's band but was drafted into the US Navy during World War II. Upon demobilization, he worked internationally with the bands of Paul Barbarin and Kid Ory, later returning to New Orleans where he played with several of the well-known jazz and brass bands in the city. He was regularly seen at Preservation Hall and toured Australia with a band made up of Preservation Hall musicians. In 1975, he suffered a stroke but continued playing until his death on August 15, 1976. Recordings of broadcast performances he made with Kid Ory's band at San Francisco's Hangover Club, have been issued on the Danish Storyville label, and some with trombonist Bill Matthews appear on Southland. Burbank also recorded with Wooden Joe Nicholas (American Music AMCD-5), Herb Morand (AMCD-9 and 106), Kid Clayton (AMCD-62), Paul Barbarin (AMCD-106), Percy Humphrey (GHB Records BCD-85), and Jimmy Archey (BCD-310).
