= Louis Armstrong and His Hot Seven =

U.S. jazz group

Louis Armstrong and His Hot Seven was a jazz studio group organized to make a series of recordings for Okeh Records in Chicago, Illinois, in May 1927. Some of the personnel also recorded with Louis Armstrong and His Hot Five, including Johnny Dodds (clarinet), Lil Armstrong (piano), and Johnny St. Cyr (banjo and guitar). These musicians were augmented by Dodds' brother, Baby Dodds (drums), Pete Briggs (tuba), and John Thomas (trombone, replacing Armstrong's usual trombonist, Kid Ory, who was then touring with King Oliver). Briggs and Thomas were at the time working with Armstrong's performing group, the Sunset Cafe Stompers.

In five sessions between May 7 and May 14, 1927, the group recorded at least 12 sides, including "Willie the Weeper," "Wild Man Blues", "Twelfth Street Rag" and "Potato Head Blues" (celebrated for Louis Armstrong's stop-time solo and triumphant ride-out final chorus). Thomas Brothers cites "Wild Man Blues" as a "breathtaking breakthrough" for Armstrong's solo style because of its "effortless flow between melody, embellishment, fill-ins, and breaks."

In these records, Armstrong continued and further developed his mastery of the jazz solo, almost completely dominating some of the numbers and further breaking down the New Orleans jazz style of collective improvisation into a vehicle for the soloist. In addition to his continued personal development, the Hot Seven sides feature Armstrong's new inclination towards worked-out and rehearsed arrangements, which can be heard in "Chicago Breakdown" and "Willie the Weeper".

The Hot Seven song "Melancholy Blues" is included on the Voyager Golden Record, attached to the Voyager twin spacecraft.

== See also ==
- Louis Armstrong and his Hot Five
- Louis Armstrong Hot Five and Hot Seven Sessions
- Hot Fives & Sevens
