= Weather Bird =

Single by Louis Armstrong
- B-side: "Dear Old Southland"
- Released: late 1928 or early 1929
- Recorded: December 5, 1928
- Genre: jazz
- Label: Okeh 41454

Official audio
- "Weather Bird" on YouTube

"Weather Bird" is a musical composition by Joe Oliver. However Thomas Brothers has suggested that it was composed by Louis Armstrong, because Armstrong sent a lead sheet of "Weather Bird Rag" to Washington, D.C. for copyright in April 1923 and that, despite its 1923 copyright date, it was composed by Armstrong during his time on the Mississippi river boats.

On December 5, 1928, Louis Armstrong and Earl Hines recorded it as a duet between trumpet and piano. That recording is regarded as the "most famous duet in jazz history". (In fact, it was issued by Okeh Records as Louis Armstrong's "trumpet solo with piano accompaniment by Earl Hines" and is sometimes considered a solo. Armstrong had also performed the composition before, as second cornet with Oliver's Creole Jazz Band in 1923.) Citing its improvisational sound, Brothers describes this recording as "fun and exceptional, a worthy document of a unique musical friendship."

== Awards ==
The recording by Louis Armstrong and Earl Hines was inducted in the Grammy Hall of Fame in 2008.
