= Pete Briggs =

American jazz bass and tuba player (1904–unknown)

- Born: 1904; Charleston, South Carolina, United States
- Genres: Jazz
- Instrument(s): Double bass, tuba

Pete Briggs (born 1904, date of death unknown) was an American jazz bass and tuba player.

Briggs was born in Charleston, South Carolina and was related to bandleader Arthur Briggs. He first played professionally in the early 1920s with the Jim Jam Jazzers, and soon after played with the Lucky Boy Minstrels. In 1926 he moved to Chicago, playing with Carroll Dickerson, Jimmie Noone, and Louis Armstrong, with whom he recorded copiously. Briggs appears on many of the Hot Seven recordings made with Armstrong and his band.

In 1929, Briggs went to New York City, playing there with Armstrong and Dickerson. He joined the Edgar Hayes Orchestra and the Vernon Andrade Orchestra in the 1930s. In the 1940s he played with Herman Autrey in Philadelphia. However, by the latter half of the decade, Briggs had given up music and become a farmer. His date of death is unknown.
