= Louis Armstrong and His Hot Five =

Jazz band

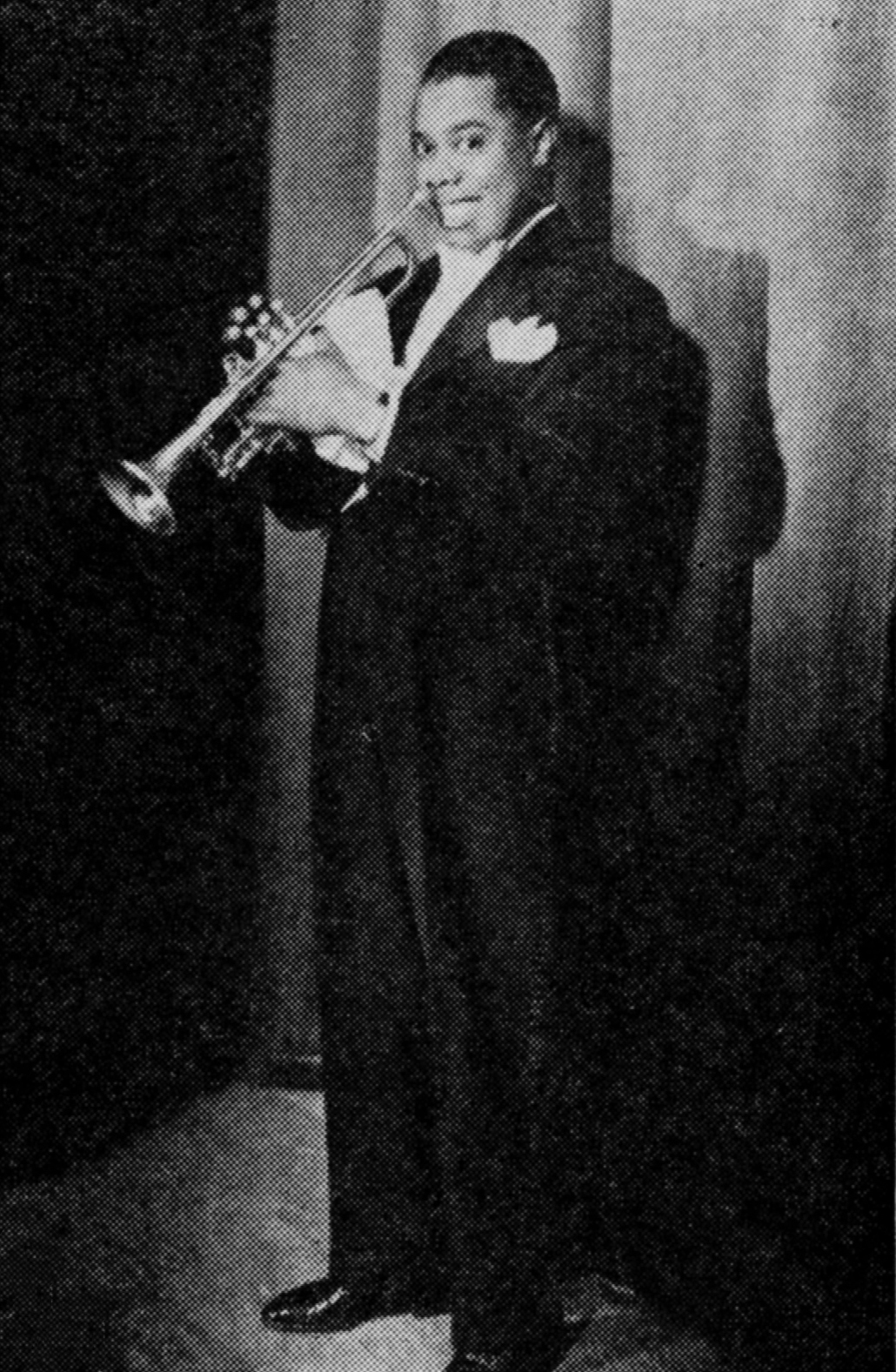
Louis Armstrong in 1936

The Hot Five was Louis Armstrong's first jazz recording band led under his own name.

It was a typical New Orleans jazz band in instrumentation, consisting of trumpet, clarinet, and trombone backed by a rhythm section. The original New Orleans jazz style leaned heavily on collective improvisation, in which the three horns together played the lead: the trumpet played the main melody, and the clarinet and trombone played improvised accompaniments to the melody. This tradition was continued in the Hot Five, but because of Armstrong's creative gifts as a trumpet player, solo passages by the trumpet alone began to appear more frequently. In these solos, Armstrong laid down the basic vocabulary of jazz improvisation and became its founding and most influential exponent.

The Hot Five was organized at the suggestion of Richard M. Jones for Okeh Records. All their records were made in Okeh's recording studio in Chicago, Illinois. The same personnel recorded a session made under the pseudonym "Lil's Hot Shots" for Vocalion/Brunswick (their first electrically recorded session). While the musicians in the Hot Five played together in other contexts, as the Hot Five they were a recording studio band that performed live only for two parties organized by Okeh.

There were two different groups called "Louis Armstrong and his Hot Five", the first recording from 1925 through 1927 and the second in 1928; Armstrong was the only musician in both groups. After 1925, the Hot Five maintained a recording schedule of about three clusters of sessions per year.

== The first Hot Five ==
The original Hot Five were Armstrong's wife, pianist Lil Hardin Armstrong, as well as New Orleans musicians who Armstrong had worked with in that city in the 1910s: Kid Ory on trombone, Johnny Dodds on clarinet, and Johnny St. Cyr on guitar and banjo. For some or all of the Louis Armstrong and His Hot Seven sides, Ory was in New York City working with King Oliver's band, and was replaced, probably by John Thomas. The first Hot Five sides, "Yes! I'm in the Barrel", composed by Armstrong, "My Heart" composed by Hardin Armstrong, and "Gut Bucket Blues" attributed to Armstrong, were recorded on November 12, 1925, with little rehearsal. The next session occurred on February 22, 1926, with the recording of "Come Back, Sweet Papa," composed by New Orleanian Paul Barbarin and Panamanian Luis Russell. The Hot Five's success was solidified as a result of the third session on February 26, 1926, which produced "Oriental Strut," "Georgia Grind," "Cornet Chop Suey," "Muskrat Ramble," "Heebie Jeebies," and "You're Next." In particular, "Heebie Jeebies," featuring Armstrong's famous scat chorus, made Armstrong a local celebrity in Chicago; it also became featured and advertised for Chicago's white market.

As a result of the Hot Five's new fame, Okeh offered a five-year contract and brought them back into the studio on June 16, 1926, and June 23, 1926. The next highly successful session occurred in December 1927, producing the famous "Struttin' With Some Barbeque." In this session, Lonnie Johnson was added on guitar and vocals for the songs "I'm Not Rough," "Savoy Blues," and "Hotter Than That." "Hotter Than That," in the words of Thomas Brothers, is a piece turned "into a vehicle for their hometown bag of heartfelt musical tricks — a stunning passage of polymetric tension, rigorous commitment to the fixed and variable model, microphone-aided scat, vehement attack, vocal inflections on the guitar, plaintive dialogue, timbral diversity, and... collective improvisation."

The ensemble passages are frequently effective, and the genius of Armstrong's cornet or trumpet playing touch virtually every recording. Some of the more important examples are "Cornet Chop Suey", "Muskrat Ramble", "Hotter Than That" and "Struttin' with Some Barbecue".

== The 1928 Hot Five ==
In 1928, Armstrong revamped the recording band, replacing everyone but himself with members of the Carroll Dickerson Orchestra, in which Armstrong was playing: Fred Robinson on trombone, Jimmy Strong on clarinet and tenor saxophone, Earl Hines on piano, Mancy Carr (not "Cara" as has often been misprinted) on banjo, and Zutty Singleton on drums.

The 1928 Hot Five played music that was specifically arranged as opposed to the more freewheeling improvised passages of the earlier Hot Five. A tentative movement toward the kind of fully arranged horn sections that would dominate swing music a decade later was starting to become fashionable, and this second Armstrong group embraced a rudimentary version of it, with Don Redman as arranger providing some written-out section parts. Strong on clarinet and Robinson on trombone were not as strong soloists as Dodds and Ory had been with the earlier band, but Hines was more nearly Armstong's equal technically and creatively than any other in either band.

Thus, these sessions resulted in some of the most important masterpieces of early jazz, of which "West End Blues" is arguably the best known. Other important recordings include "Basin Street Blues", "Tight Like This", "Saint James Infirmary", and "Weather Bird". In the last named, only Armstrong and Hines are present, turning an old rag number into a tour-de-force duet.

== See also ==
- Louis Armstrong and His Hot Seven
- Louis Armstrong Hot Five and Hot Seven Sessions
- Hot Fives & Sevens, a 2000 compilation album of music by the group
