= Weary Blues =

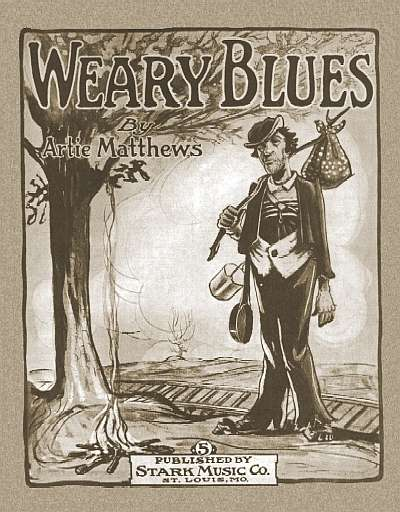
- 1915 sheet music cover

Song
- Published: 1915
- Genre: Jazz
- Songwriter: Artie Matthews

"Weary Blues" is a 1915 tune by Artie Matthews.

Despite the name, the form is a multi-strain ragtime rather than a conventional blues. (At the time it was published, many hot or raggy numbers were published with the word "Blues" in the title). It is often known by the alternative title "Shake It and Break It," especially when played by New Orleans jazz bands.

The first jazz recording of the number was made by Yellow Nunez with the Louisiana Five in 1919. The tune is a perennial jazz standard, especially with Dixieland groups. Important recordings of the piece include those by the New Orleans Rhythm Kings, Louis Armstrong and His Hot Seven, Johnny Dodds, Sidney Bechet, George Lewis, Wooden Joe Nicholas, Bunk Johnson, Sweet Emma Barrett, and many others.

The McGuire Sisters covered "Weary Blues" in 1956. Their version reached #32 on the U.S. Billboard chart.

== See also ==
- List of pre-1920 jazz standards
