= Big Butter and Egg Man =

Single by Louis Armstrong and his Hot Five
- B-side: "Sunset Cafe Stomp"
- Released: December 1926
- Recorded: 1926
- Genre: Jazz
- Songwriter: Percy Venable
- Producer: Percy Venable

"Big Butter and Egg Man" is a 1926 jazz song written by Percy Venable. Venable was a record producer at the Sunset Cafe and wrote the song for Louis Armstrong and singer May Alix. The song is often played by Dixieland bands, and is considered a jazz standard.

According to pianist Earl Hines, Alix would often tease the young Armstrong during performances. Armstrong was known to be timid, and had a crush on the beautiful vocalist. At times, Armstrong would forget the lyrics and just stare at Alix, and band members would shout "Hold it, Louis! Hold it."

The song name was a 1920s slang term for a big spender, a traveling businessman in the habit of spending large amounts of money in nightclubs. The song is also known as "I Want a Big Butter and Egg Man" or "Big Butter and Egg Man from the West".

Armstrong recorded the song again in 1951 for Decca Records as a duet with Velma Middleton.

The song was also recorded by country artist Merle Haggard in 1985, for his Kern River album. The jazz sound of the original 1926 recording was blended with Merle's signature country sound, to make a very pleasing version of this song. This recording shows Merle's diverse talent and taste in music, and was produced by Merle Haggard and Grady Martin.

== History ==
The term “Butter and Egg Man” originally referred to merchants who dealt with eggs and/or butter. In 1925, a play titled “The Butter and Egg Man” by George S. Kaufman debuted. It was about a rich man who came to New York with plans to liberally and exuberantly spend his money on wine, women, and song. This play was a big hit and contributed to the popularization of the term. “Butter and Egg Man” came to mean a rich man who freely and ostentatiously spent his money on women. In the following year, Armstrong's hit jazz song “Big Butter and Egg Man” further popularized the usage of the term. The lyrics to the song describe a woman who wanted a butter and egg man to treat her well and let her play so she doesn't need to work all day. After the popularization of the term, some merchants who sold eggs and butter were upset because it painted them in a negative light. One such merchant, from Minneapolis, even sued the theater and its star for vilifying the hardworking merchants, claiming that when the star sang about them, she did so with “certain tones and gestures to convey that all dealers in butter and egg were men of immoral and licentious character”.

There are other noted reasons for the popularization of the phrase. Texas Guinan, a New York night club hostess, is also attributed to the popularization of the term in a derogatory fashion because of her usage when targeting one of her customers. Walter Winchell has also stated that the original butter and egg man was “Uncle Sam” Balcom, and the first person to use it in a derogatory manner was Harry Richman.

== Armstrong's famous solo ==
Armstrong's cornet solo on the 1926 recording is one of his most highly acclaimed performances.

"The most important aspect of this solo, and indeed of Armstrong's playing on the record as a whole, is the air of easy grace with which he carries the melody. He is utterly confident, utterly sure what he has to say is important and will be listened to." – James Lincoln Collier, Armstrong's biographer

This solo, as analyzed by Thomas Brothers, was perfected over time as he performed this number in a cabaret act at the Sunset Café with May Alix. As such, it was not improvised, but a "crystallized moment of excellence" influenced by vernacular melodic variation and dance rhythms. The balanced nature of the solo's content, often compared to Mozart and Schubert, comes from subtle rhythmic variation with melodic repetition, focus on melodic contour when phrasing, and harmonic tension from early anticipation of chord changes.

== See also ==
- List of 1920s jazz standards
