= Potato Head Blues =

Recording by Louis Armstrong

Song by Louis Armstrong and his Hot Seven
- Recorded: May 10, 1927 in Chicago, Illinois
- Genre: Jazz
- Label: Okeh Records
- Songwriter(s): Louis Armstrong

"Potato Head Blues" is a Louis Armstrong composition regarded as one of his finest recordings. It was made by Louis Armstrong and his Hot Seven for Okeh Records in Chicago, Illinois on May 10, 1927. It was recorded during a remarkably productive week in which Armstrong's usual Hot Five was temporarily expanded to seven players by the addition of tuba and drums. Some scholars have suggested that a key melodic figure in "Potato Head Blues" was picked up by Hoagy Carmichael for "Stardust." Its musical composition entered the public domain on January 1, 2023.

The recording features clarinet work by Johnny Dodds, and the stop-time solo chorus in the last half of the recording is one of Armstrong's most famous solos. The stop-time aspects of "Potato Head Blues" was derived from the tap-dancing tradition at the Sunset Café as well as the New Orleanian tradition of adding breaks and fill-ins.

Author and Director of Research Collections for the Louis Armstrong House Museum, Ricky Riccardi states that when it came to taking improvised solos, Armstrong was light years ahead of his contemporaries in every way: command of his instrument, harmonic knowledge, a swinging rhythmic feel and put simply, the ability to "tell a story." 1927’s "Potato Head Blues,” with the expanded Hot Seven, again represents a joyous example of New Orleans polyphony until Armstrong steps up and takes a stop-time solo that still sounds fresh and modern today, defining the art of the improvised solo in not just jazz but all forms of popular music.

Critic Thomas Ward called this recording "one of the most astonishing accomplishments in all of twentieth century music." Ralph Ellison described it as "a classic demonstration of African-American elegance."

In Woody Allen's 1979 film, Manhattan, the character Isaac Davis (played by Allen) lists Armstrong's recording of "Potato Head Blues" as one of the reasons that life is worth living.
