= Fred Robinson (musician) =

American jazz musician

- Born: Frederick L. Robinson; February 20, 1901; Memphis, Tennessee, U.S.
- Died: April 11, 1984 (aged 83) New York City, New York, U.S.
- Genres: Jazz
- Instruments: Trombone

Frederick L. Robinson (February 20, 1901 – April 11, 1984) was an American jazz trombonist known for his work with Louis Armstrong and other jazz groups.

== Early life ==
Robinson was born on February 20, 1901, in Memphis, Tennessee. Robinson learned to play trombone in high school. He studied at the Dana Musical Institute in Ohio.

== Career ==
Robinson moved to Chicago in 1927. There, he joined Carroll Dickerson's orchestra. In 1928, Robinson travelled to New York to play in Louis Armstrong's big band. Robinson played on Louis Armstrong's Hot Five recordings and continued working with both Dickerson and Armstrong until late 1929 when he took a position in Edgar Hayes's band.

In the 1930s, Robinson worked alongside Marion Hardy, Don Redman, Benny Carter, Charlie Turner, Fletcher Henderson, and Fats Waller. In 1939 and 1940 he joined Andy Kirk's band. Later in the 1940s, he played with George James, Cab Calloway, and Sy Oliver. In the early 1950s, he worked with Noble Sissle.

Robinson ended his full-time musical career in the mid-1950s.
