= Willie the Weeper =

Song about drug addiction

Song
- Written: ca. 1904
- Songwriters: Credited to Walter Melrose, Grant Rymal and Marty Bloom

"Willie the Weeper" (Roud 977) is a folk song about drug addiction. It is based on a standard vaudeville song, likely written in 1904. It is credited to Walter Melrose, Grant Rymal and Marty Bloom, who published it with Morris Edwin H & Co Inc in 1908. Many artists recorded the song; one of the earliest was in 1925 by Ernest Rogers, which shares several lines with Cab Calloway's "Minnie the Moocher". In 1927, other artists to record the song include Frankie "Half-Pint" Jaxon, Louis Armstrong and His Hot Seven, and King Oliver.

The song has many different versions, but all share a common theme: Willie, a chimney sweeper with a dope habit, is introduced. The rest of the song is a description of his drug-induced dream. As Carl Sandburg wrote in his book The American Songbag:

R. W. Gordon in his editorship of the Adventure magazine department "Old Songs That Men Have Sung" received thirty versions of Willy the Weeper, about one hundred verses different. Willy shoots craps with kings, plays poker with presidents, eats nightingale tongues a queen cooks for him; his Monte Carlo winnings come to a million, he lights his pipe with a hundred dollar bill, he has heart affairs with Cleopatra, the Queen of Sheba, and movie actresses.

In later years, various artists covered the song. Dave Van Ronk has covered this song. Bette Davis sings this song in the film The Cabin in the Cotton. The song should not be confused with Billy Walker's 1962 song "Willie the Weeper", which reached No. 5 on the country charts. Despite having the same title, the songs are unrelated.

George Burns claimed to have introduced the song in 1916 and performed a version of it on the Johnny Carson show in 1989.

== Lyrics ==
Have you ever heard about Willie the Weeper?
Had a job as a chimney sweeper,
He had the dope habit and he had it bad,
Listen while I tell you about a dream he had,

He went down to the dope shop one Saturday night,
He knew the lights would all be burning bright,
Well I guess he smoked a dozen pills or more,
When he woke up he was on a foreign shore,

The Queen of Sheba was the first he met,
She called him lovey-dovey and honey pet,
She gave him a great big automobile,
With a diamond headlight and a golden wheel,

Down in Honolulu Willie fell in a trance,
Seein' the dusky beauties do the Hula dance,
His sweetie got in jail and Willie sure did shout,
When he got the news that she had wiggled out,

He landed with a splash in the river Nile,
Ridin' on a seagoin' crocodile,
He winked at Cleopatra, she said "Ain't he a sight"
'n' he said, "How 'bout a date for next Saturday night?"

He had a million cattle and he had a million sheep,
Had a million vessels on the ocean deep,
Had a million dollars all in nickels and dimes,
Well he knew because he counted it a thousand times,

He landed in New York one evenin’ late,
He asked his sugar for an after-date,
Started to kiss her and she started to pout,
When bang-blang!
And the dope gave out!

== Derivative works ==
- Minnie the Moocher
- Willie the Weeper (1948), a one-act musical by Jerome Moross
