= Twelfth Street Rag =

1914 ragtime musical composition

"12th Street Rag"
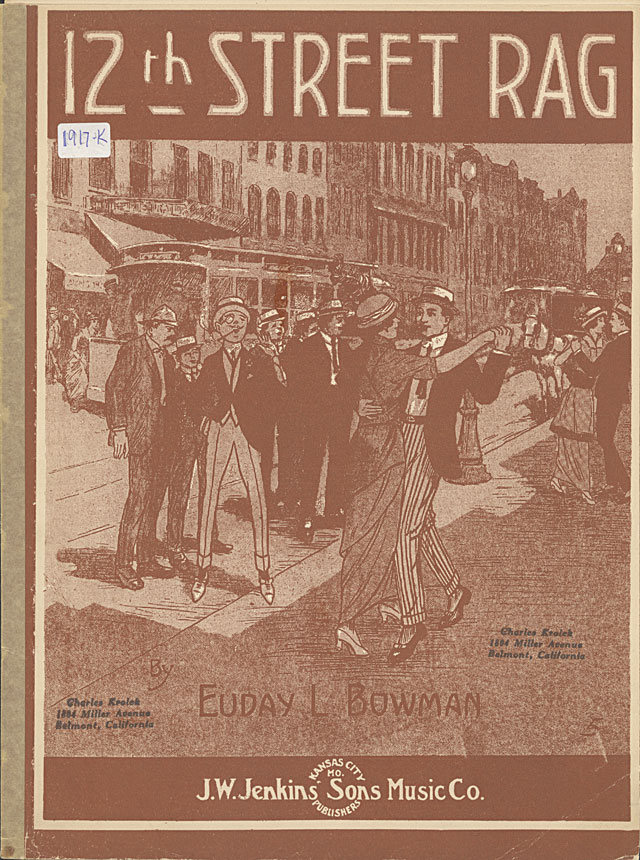
- Original sheet music published in 1915

Composition by Euday Bowman
- Written: 1898
- Published: January 30, 1914 by Jenkins Music Company
- Genre: Ragtime
- Songwriter: Euday Bowman
- Instrument: Piano, solo (in original form)

"Twelfth Street Rag" (alternatively "12th Street Rag") is a ragtime musical composition written by Euday L. Bowman in 1914.

== Background ==
A friend of Euday Bowman known as "Raggedy Ed" declared his intention to open a pawn shop on 12th Street in Kansas City while the two were walking along it. Bowman is rumored to have said "If you get rich on those three balls, I'll write a piece on three notes to make myself rich."

It was more than 15 years after he composed the song before he actually wrote the music down in manuscript form. He returned to Texas briefly and tried to sell the piece to a company in Dallas; but he only had an offer of ten dollars for it and was told it really was not worth publishing. Returning to Kansas City, he sold it to Jenkins Music Company in 1913. The Jenkins company felt Bowman's arrangement was far too difficult however, hiring C. E. Wheeler to simplify it. With a big advertising push "12th Street Rag" began to sell better. In 1919, James S. Sumner added lyrics. The song was popular with early Kansas City bands and became a hit after Bennie Moten recorded it for RCA Victor in 1927, the same year Louis Armstrong and His Hot Seven recorded it.

== Composition ==
The piece was written in E-flat major and follows an AABA form.

== Other recordings ==
Bowman recorded and published his own recording of the piece, on Bowman 11748. Louis Armstrong and His Hot Seven recorded the song for Okeh Records in Chicago in May 1927. Krazy Kat and his orchestra perform the music in the 1930 cartoon The Bandmaster. A recording by Pee Wee Hunt was the Billboard number-one single for 1948, selling more than three million copies. It was released as Capitol Records 15105 in May 1948. Donald Peers recorded the song in London on March 26, 1949. It was released by EMI on the His Master's Voice label as catalogue number B 9763. Other notable performers of the song include Roy Clark, Barney Kessel, and Jack Teagarden.

== Popular culture ==
Marv Albert used the song as the underscore for his popular sports feature "The Albert Achievement Awards", which consisted of clips of various highlight plays and bloopers from across various pro sports, narrated by Albert. The feature was seen frequently on Albert's NBC sports broadcasts in the 1980s and 1990s, as well as on Late Night with David Letterman and The Late Show with David Letterman between 1982 and 2015.

Prior to 1985, the song was used as the theme to The Joe Franklin Show.

A brief excerpt of the song can also be heard about 37 minutes into the 1996 film The English Patient. The melody of the song is heard in the Chuck E. Cheese 1999 film Chuck E. Cheese in the Galaxy 5000, serving as the basis for the song, "The Galaxy's For You and Me". The same melody is played during the first scene in the soda shop.

The song is sampled in two "Weird Al" Yankovic polka medleys: "Hooked on Polkas" and "Polka Power!".

Since 1999, a steel guitar version has been featured as background music on the US television cartoon series by Nickelodeon, SpongeBob SquarePants.

The Rastrelli Cello Quartet recorded a version for four cellos in 2006, on the album Vol. 1 - Concerto Grosso A LA Russe.

In 2006, a Huell Howser episode of California's Gold began by Huell asking Fotoplayer operator Joe Rinaudo to "hit it Joe", following which Joe launched into a rendition of "Twelfth Street Rag".

== See also ==
- List of pre-1920 jazz standards
