= Boyd Atkins =

American musician (1900–1965)

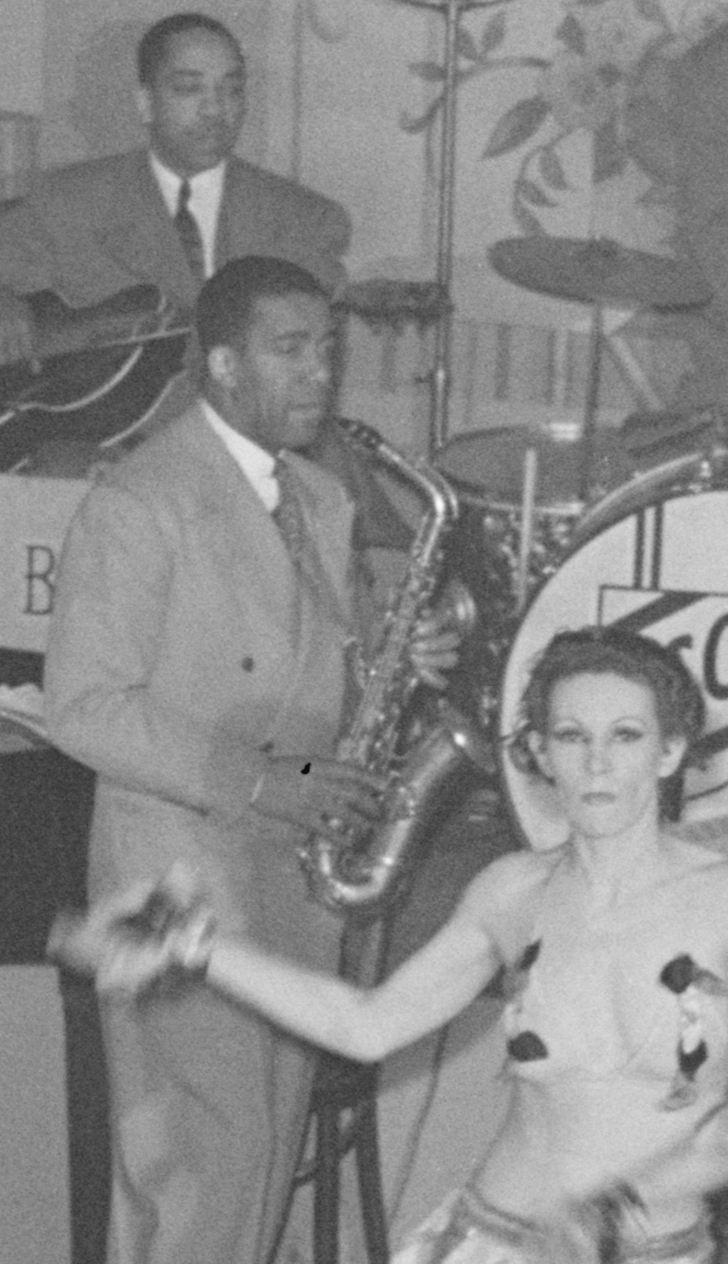
Atkins on the bandstand at a Chicago South Side Cabaret, 1941

Boyd Atkins (1900 – March 1, 1965) was an American jazz and blues reed player. He played saxophone and violin professionally.

Atkins was born in Paducah, Kentucky, United States.

Atkins played with the Fate Marable band touring on the Mississippi River in the late 1910s. He was on the St. Louis, Missouri musical scene with the band of Dewey Jackson early in the 1920s. Following this Atkins moved to Chicago and led his own band which included Kid Ory. He also worked with Earl Hines and Carroll Dickerson. In 1927, Atkins joined Louis Armstrong's band at the Sunset Cafe in Chicago, where he played clarinet along with soprano and alto saxophone. Armstrong's band played Atkins' most famous tune, "Heebie Jeebies". Later in the 1920s he again led his own band, The Firecrackers.

Between 1931 and 1934 he played with Eli Rice, and became a bandleader in Minneapolis in the middle of the decade. He also played with Rook Ganz there. In 1940 he fronted the Society Swingsters in Peoria, Illinois. He was back in Chicago by 1951, and in the 1950s he took more work as an arranger, and played more often with blues musicians such as Elmore James and Magic Sam.

Atkins died in Cook County, Illinois, on March 1, 1965.

Some details of Atkins' life are obscure, with his full date of birth unknown.
