= Carroll Dickerson =

American jazz violinist and bandleader (1895–1957)

- Born: November 1, 1895; Shawneetown, Illinois, U.S.
- Died: October 9, 1957 (aged 61) Chicago, Illinois, U.S.
- Genres: Jazz
- Occupation: Bandleader
- Instrument: Violin
- Formerly of: Louis Armstrong, Earl Hines, King Oliver

Carroll Dickerson (November 1, 1895 – October 9, 1957) was a Chicago and New York–based dixieland jazz violinist and bandleader, probably better known for his extensive work with Louis Armstrong and Earl Hines or his more brief work touring with King Oliver.

Dickerson played a major role as a bandleader in Chicago; his sidemen there included Johnny Dunn, Frankie Half Pint Jaxon, Tommy Ladnier, Honore Dutrey, Natty Dominique, Sterling Conaway, Boyd Atkins, Fred Robinson, Jimmy Strong, Mancy Carr, Pete Briggs, and Jimmy Mundy.

Dickerson first directed a band from 1922 to 1924 in the Sunset Cafe, which led to a longer tour, in which his sideman, Louis Armstrong, quickly became known (and later took his place). He was known for his strictness, issuing penalties to musicians who missed notes. His "Carroll Dickerson Savoyagers" then appeared in the Savoy Ballroom, as well as in New York in the late 1920s.

Despite their differences in Chicago about Armstrong taking over the orchestra, musicians such as Armstrong, Buster Bailey, George Mitchell, Earl Hines and Zutty Singleton played in Dickerson's Savoy Orchestra. The musicians of Armstrong's Hot Five and Hot Seven of 1927 were musicians taken from the Dickerson orchestra, and he himself played with some recordings as a violinist. He also toured with King Oliver.

Dickerson briefly directed the Mills Blue Rhythm Band before returning to Chicago.
