= Heebie Jeebies (composition) =

1926 single by Louis Armstrong and His Hot Five

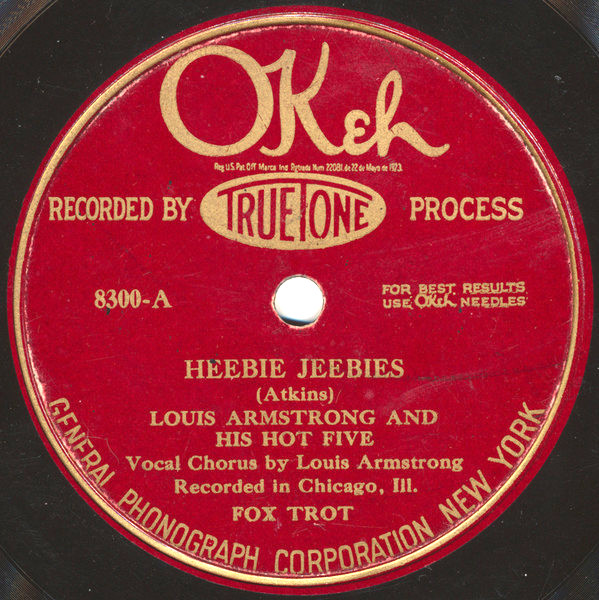

Single by Louis Armstrong and His Hot Five
- Released: May 1926
- Recorded: February 26, 1926; Chicago, Illinois, U.S.
- Genre: Dixieland jazz
- Length: 2:52
- Label: Okeh (Cat no. 9534-A)
- Songwriter: Boyd Atkins

"Heebie Jeebies" is a composition written by Boyd Atkins which achieved fame when it was recorded and released by Louis Armstrong in 1926. Armstrong also performed "Heebie Jeebies" as a number at the Vendome Theatre. The recording on Okeh Records by Louis Armstrong and His Hot Five includes a famous example of scat singing by Armstrong. After the success of the recording, an accompanying dance was choreographed and advertised by Okeh.

"Heebie Jeebies" (1926) excerpt
A 13-second sample of Louis Armstrong's "Heebie Jeebies" song.

A popular legend (apparently originating from a 1930s claim by Richard M. Jones) says that Armstrong dropped his lyric sheet while recording the song and for lack of words to sing, began to improvise his vocals and thereby created the technique of scat singing. This story, though popular, may be apocryphal. Although Armstrong did not invent scat singing, because it was already practiced by many musicians in New Orleans during the early twentieth century, Armstrong, Kid Ory, and Johnny St. Cyr confirm in their accounts that he did drop the sheet music during the session, prompting the need to improvise. Nevertheless, the inventiveness of the technique impressed many when the record first came out. Mezz Mezzrow's book Really the Blues recounts the delighted reactions of Frank Teschmacher, Bix Beiderbecke, and other musicians. Another notable feature of the record is the hokum coda, in which a line is delivered too early, leaving the break over which it should have been spoken completely empty.

Various other recordings of the tune followed in the 1920s and 1930s. The Boswell Sisters performed the tune on radio, record, and in the film The Big Broadcast. Chick Webb made a notable recording with an arrangement by Benny Carter.

== See also ==
- Louis Armstrong discography
