= Jimmy Strong (musician) =

American musician

- Born: August 29, 1906
- Origin: Chicago, Illinois, U.S.
- Died: April 1977 (aged 70); Jersey City, New Jersey, U.S.
- Genres: Jazz
- Instruments: Clarinet, tenor saxophone

Jimmy Strong (August 29, 1906 – April 1977) was an American jazz reedist. While he is best known as a clarinetist, he occasionally played tenor saxophone as well.

== Career ==
Strong was based in Chicago as a teenager, performing in Lottie Hightower's Nighthawks. Around 1925, he did a national tour with a traveling revue and stayed in California for a time, freelancing with several groups. Upon his return, he joined Carroll Dickerson's orchestra, where he worked with Louis Armstrong; he appears on Armstrong's Hot Fives recordings. In 1928, he also worked briefly with Clifford King. In the 1930s, he played with Cassino Simpson, Zinky Cohn, and Jimmie Noone, in addition to his own bands. Around 1940, he relocated to Jersey City, New Jersey, where he performed with local bands until his death in 1977.
