= Luis Russell =

Panamanian pianist, orchestra leader, and composer (1902-1963)

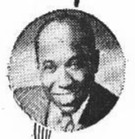

Background information
- Born: Luis Carl Russell; August 5, 1902; Careening Cay, near Bocas del Toro, Panama
- Died: December 11, 1963 (aged 61) New York City, U.S.
- Genres: Jazz, big band
- Occupations: Musician, bandleader
- Instrument: Piano

Luis Carl Russell (August 5, 1902 – December 11, 1963) was a pioneering Panamanian jazz pianist, orchestra leader, composer, and arranger.

== Career ==
Luis Carl Russell was born on Careening Cay, near Bocas del Toro, Panama, in a family of African-Caribbean ancestry. His father was a music teacher, and Russell learned to play guitar, piano, and violin. He had begun playing professionally, accompanying silent films by 1917 and later at a casino in Colón, Panama.

In 1919, he won $3,000 in a lottery and used it to move to the United States, with his mother and sister, settling in New Orleans, Louisiana, where he worked as a pianist. He moved to Chicago, Illinois, in 1925 and worked with Doc Cook and King Oliver. The Oliver band moved to New York City, and Russell left to form his own band. By 1929, Russell's band became one of the leading jazz groups in New York City. It had several former Oliver sidemen. Performers in his band included trumpeter Red Allen, trombonist J. C. Higginbotham, and alto saxophonist Albert Nicholas. Louis Armstrong took over the band in 1935.

Between 1926 and 1934, Russell recorded 38 sides (mostly using his own name), plus those issued under Red Allen (1929) and a handful where Armstrong led his band. After the OKeh contract ended in September 1930, Russell recorded a handful of sessions for Melotone, Brunswick and Victor. After no recordings under his name between late 1931 and late 1934, Russell recorded a session for ARC (Melotone, Perfect, Oriole, Banner, Romeo) in 1934, which yielded six sides (three featured Sonny Woods's novelty vocals, one featured the vocal group the Palmer Brothers).

The band returned to Russell's name, while Armstrong played in California and Europe in the early 1930s; Russell and Armstrong were reunited in 1935. That same year, Armstrong took over the orchestra altogether, and for the next eight years they functioned as back-up band for Armstrong, with Russell acting as the musical director.

Russell led a new band from 1943 to 1948 that played at the Savoy and Apollo and made a few recordings. These included his 1946 version of the pop standard, "The Very Thought of You". In 1948, Russell retired from music and opened a notions shop, with irregular band gigs and teaching music on the side. In 1959, he visited Panama where he gave a piano recital of classical music.

He died in New York City at the age of 61. His daughter, Catherine Russell, is a jazz singer.

== Discography ==
As leader

- 1926–29 - The Chronological (Classics 588, 1991) Luis Russell and His Orchestra
- 1930–34 - The Chronological (Classics 606, 1991) Luis Russell and His Orchestra
- 1929–34 - The Luis Russell Story 1929–1934 (Retrieval Records, 2000/2006) (2xCD) This disc largely duplicates the previous two but with better audio quality
- 1929–34 - Saratoga Shout (ASV Living Era, 2007) anthology of the first two Chronological albums
- 1938–40 - At The Swing Cats Ball (Newly Discovered Recordings From the Closet, Volume 1: 1938–40) (Dot Time Records, 2023) Russell Orchestra under Armstrong's name
- 1945–46 - The Chronological (Classics 1066, 1999) Luis Russell and His Orchestra

With Louis Armstrong

- 1929–40 - Louis & Luis, 1929–1940 (ASV Living Era, 1992)

With Henry "Red" Allen

- 1929–33 - The Chronological (Classics 540, 1990)
