= Louis Armstrong discography =

American jazz trumpeter and singer discography

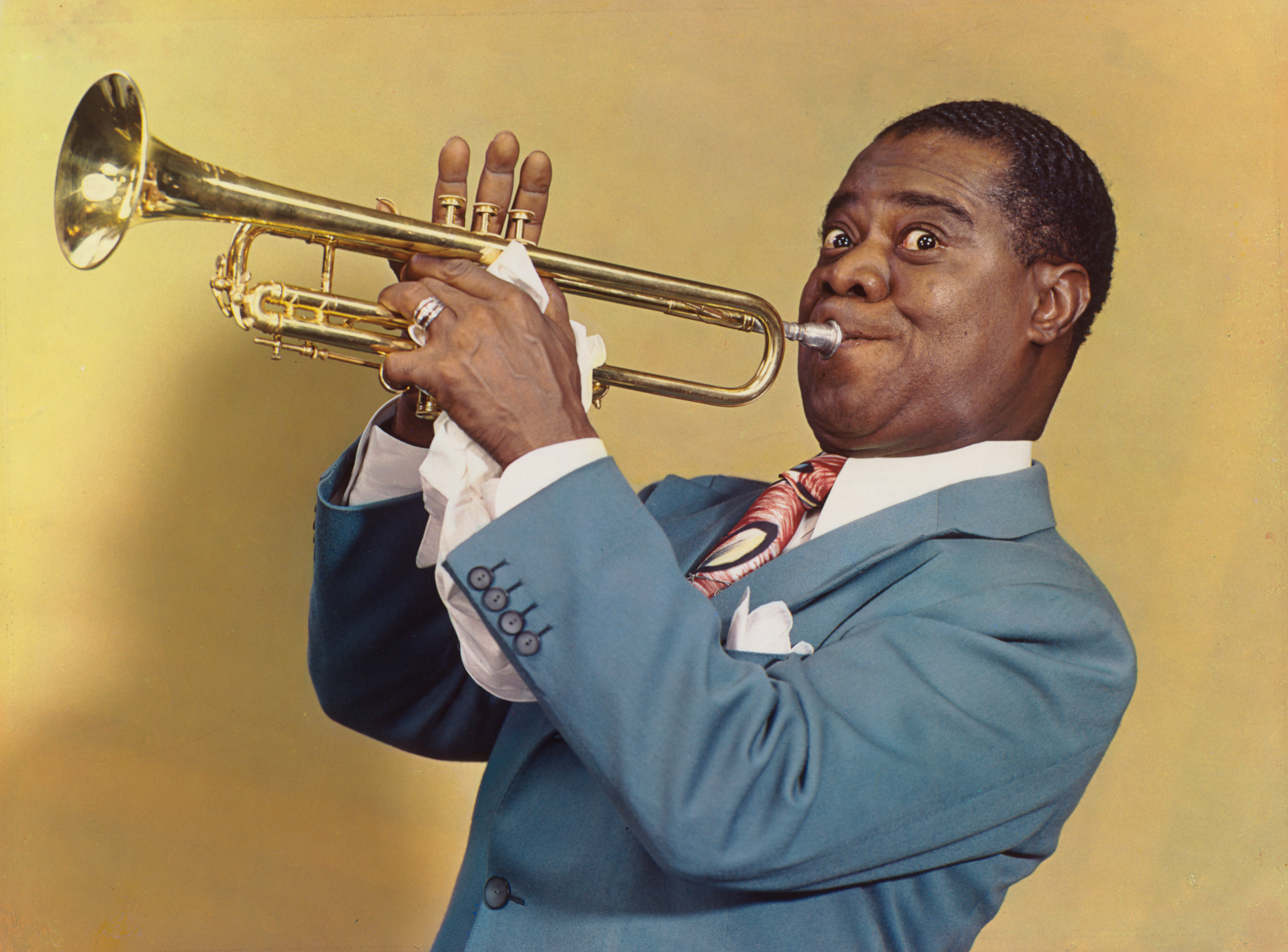
Armstrong in 1947

Louis Armstrong (1901–1971), nicknamed Satchmo or Pops, was an American trumpeter, composer, singer and occasional actor who was one of the most influential figures in jazz and in all of American popular music. His career spanned five decades, from the 1920s to the 1960s, and different eras in jazz.

Coming to prominence in the 1920s as an "inventive" trumpet and cornet player, Armstrong was a foundational influence in jazz, shifting the focus of the music from collective improvisation to solo performance. With his instantly recognizable gravelly voice, Armstrong was also an influential singer, demonstrating great dexterity as an improviser, bending the lyrics and melody of a song for expressive purposes. He was also skilled at scat singing.

Renowned for his charismatic stage presence and voice almost as much as for his trumpet-playing, Armstrong's influence extends well beyond jazz music, and by the end of his career in the 1960s, he was widely regarded as a profound influence on popular music in general. Armstrong was one of the first truly popular African-American entertainers to "cross over", whose skin color was secondary to his music in an America that was racially divided. He rarely publicly politicized his race, often to the dismay of fellow African-Americans, but took a well-publicized stand for desegregation in the Little Rock Crisis. His artistry and personality allowed him socially acceptable access to the upper echelons of American society which were highly restricted for black men of his era.

== Discography ==
=== 78 and 45 rpm ===
Year	Title(s)	Label	Credit (if not Louis Armstrong)
1923	"Froggie Moore" / "Chimes Blues"	Gennett 5135	King Oliver's Creole Jazz Band
1923	"Mandy Lee Blues" / "I'm Going Away to Wear You off My Mind"	Gennett 5134	King Oliver's Creole Jazz Band
1923	"Riverside Blues" / "Mabel's Dream" [Take 1]	Claxtonola 40292	King Oliver's Jazz Band
1923	"New Orleans Hop Scop Blues" / "Jazzin' Babies' Blues"	OKeh 4975	Clarence Williams' Blue Five (without Louis Armstrong) / King Oliver's Jazz Band
1923	"Dipper Mouth Blues" / "Weather Bird Rag"	Gennett 5132	King Oliver's Creole Jazz Band
1923	"Just Gone" / "Canal Street Blues"	Gennett 5133	King Oliver's Creole Jazz Band
1923	"High Society Rag" / "Snake Rag"	Gennett 5184	OKeh 4933
1923	"Sobbin' Blues" / "Sweet Lovin' Man"	Okeh 4906	King Oliver's Jazz Band
1923	"Chattanooga Stomp" / "New Orleans Stomp"	Columbia 13003D	King Oliver's Jazz Band
1923	"Dipper Mouth Blues" / "Where Did You Stay Last Night?"	Okeh 4918	King Oliver's Jazz Band
1923	"London (Cafe) Blues" / "Camp Meeting Blues"	Columbia 14003-D	King Oliver's Jazz Band
1924	"Working Man Blues" / "Riverside Blues"	Okeh 40034	King Oliver's Jazz Band
1924	"Prince of Wails" [Take 2] / "Mandy, Make Up Your Mind" [Take 2]	Puritan 11367	Fletcher Henderson and his Orchestra
1924	"Manda" / "Go 'Long, Mule"	Columbia 228-D	Fletcher Henderson and his Orchestra
1924	"Oh! Sister, Ain't That Hot" / "Mama's Gonna Slow You Down"	The New Emerson 10713	Fletcher Henderson and his Orchestra
1924	"Some Other Day – Some Other Girl" / "My Rose Marie"	Silvertone 1298	Lanin's Arcadians (without Louis Armstrong) / Fletcher Henderson and his Orchestra
1924	"Krooked Blues" / "Alligator Hop"	Gennett 5274	King Oliver's Creole Jazz Band
1924	"Zulus Ball" / "Workingman Blues"	Gennett 5275	King Oliver's Creole Jazz Band
1924	"Tears" / "Buddy's Habit"	Okeh 40000	King Oliver's Jazz Band
1924	"Room Rent Blues" / "I Ain't Gonna Tell Nobody"	Okeh 8148	King Oliver's Jazz Band
1924	"The Southern Stomps" / "Dearborn Street Blues"	Paramount 12088	King Oliver's Jazz Band / Dearborn Street Blues (without Louis Armstrong)
1925	"Everybody Loves My Baby" / "Of All The Wrongs You Done to Me"	OKeh 8181	Clarence Williams' Blue Five
1925	"Cake Walking Babies from Home" / "Banjo Rag"	OKeh 40321	Clarence Williams' Blue Five / Chauncey C. Lee only
1925	"Come On, Coot Do That Thing" / "Have Your Chill, I'll Be Here When Your Fever Rises"	Paramount 12317	Coot Grant and "Kid" Wesley Wilson with Fletcher Henderson and his Orchestra
1925	"Bye and Bye" / Play Me Slow"	Columbia 292-D	Fletcher Henderson and his Orchestra
1925	"When You Do What You Do" / "Memphis Bound"	Vocalion 15030	Fletcher Henderson and his Orchestra
1925	"Tiger Rag" / "Don't Forget You'll Regret Day By Day"	Perfect 144470	Five Birmingham Babies (without Louis Armstrong) / Fletcher Henderson and his Orchestra
1925	"Sugar Foot Stomp" / "What-Cha-Call 'Em Blues"	Columbia 395-D	Fletcher Henderson and his Orchestra
1926	"Gut Bucket Blues" / "Yes! I'm in the Barrel"	OKeh 8261	Louis Armstrong's Hot Five
1926	"Oriental Strut" / "You're Next"	OKeh 8299	Louis Armstrong's Hot Five
1926	"Muskrat Ramble" / "Heebie Jeebies"	OKeh 8300	Louis Armstrong's Hot Five
1926	"Georgia Grind" / "Come Back, Sweet Papa"	OKeh 8318	Louis Armstrong's Hot Five
1926	"Dropping Shucks" / "Who'sit"	OKeh 8357	Louis Armstrong and his Hot Five
1926	"Don't Forget to Mess Around" / "I'm Gonna Gitcha"	OKeh 8343	
1926	"King of the Zulus" / "Lonesome Blues"	OKeh 8396	
1926	"Big Fat Ma and Skinny Pa" / "Sweet Little Papa"	OKeh 8379	
1926	"Cornet Shop Suey"/ "My Heart"	OKeh 8320	
1926	"When Your Man is Going to Put You Down (You Never Can Tell)" / "Find Me at the Greasy Spoon (If You Miss Me Here)"	Paramount 12337	Coot Grant and "Kid" Wesley Wilson with Fletcher Henderson and his Orchestra
1926	"T N T" / "Carolina Stomp"	Columbia 509-D	Fletcher Henderson and his Orchestra
1927	"Big Butter and Egg Man from the West" / "Sunset Cafe Stomp"	OKeh 8423	
1927	"You Made Me Love You" / "Irish Black Bottom"	OKeh 8447	Louis Armstrong and his Hot Five
1927	"Skid-Dat-De-Dat" / "Jazz Lips"	OKeh 8436	
1927	"Wild Man Blues" / "Gully Low Blues"	OKeh 8474	Louis Armstrong and his Hot Seven
1927	"Alligator Crawl" / "Willie the Weeper"	OKeh 8482	Louis Armstrong and his Hot Seven
1927	"Keyhole Blues" / "Melancholy Blues"	OKeh 8496	Louis Armstrong and his Hot Seven
1927	"Potato Head Blues" / "Put 'Em Down Blues"	OKeh 8503	Louis Armstrong and his Hot Seven
1927	"Weary Blues" / "That's When I'll Come Back to You"	OKeh 8519	Louis Armstrong and his Hot Five
1927	"I'm Goin' Huntin'" / "If You Want to Be My Sugar Papa"	Vocalion 1099	Jimmy Bertrand's Washboard Wizards
1927	"Wild Man Blues" / "Melancholy"	Brunswick 3567	Johnny Dodds' Black Bottom Stompers
1928	"Hotter Than That" / "Savoy Blues"	OKeh 8535	Louis Armstrong and his Hot Five
1928	"Struttin' with Some Barbecue" / "Once in a While"	OKeh 8566	Louis Armstrong and his Hot Five
1928	"West End Blues" / "Fireworks"	OKeh 8597	Louis Armstrong and his Hot Five
1928	"A Monday Date" / "Sugar Feet Strut"	OKeh 8609	Louis Armstrong and his Hot Five
1928	"Skip The Gutter" / "Knee Drops"	OKeh 8631	
1928	"Got No Blues" / "I'm Not Rough"	OKeh 8551	
1928	"Weary Blues" / "New Orleans Stomp"	Vocalion 15632	Johnny Dodds' Black Bottom Stompers
1929	"Ain't Misbehavin'" / "(What Did I Do To Be) Black And Blue"	OKeh 8714	
1929	"Two Deuces" / "Squeeze Me"	OKeh 8641	
1929	"That Rhythm Man" / "Sweet Savannah Sue"	OKeh 8717	
1929	"When You're Smiling" / "Some of These Days"	OKeh 8729	
1929	"No" / "Basin Street Blues"	OKeh 8690	
1929	"Knockin' a Jug" / "Muggles"	OKeh 8703	
1929	"St. James Infirmary" / "Save it Pretty Mamma"	OKeh 8657	
1929	"Mahogany Hall Stomp" / "Beau Koo Jack"	OKeh 8680	
1929	"Tight Like This" / "Heah Me Talkin' to Ya?"	OKeh 8649	
1929	"I Can't Give You Anything But Love" / "No One Else But You"	OKeh 8669	
1930	"I Ain't Got Nobody (And Nobody Cares for Me)" / "Rockin' Chair"	OKeh 8756	
1930	"After You've Gone" / "Saint Louis Blues"	OKeh 41350	
1930	"I'm a Ding Dong Daddy from Dumas" / "I'm in the Market for You"	OKeh 41442	
1930	"Song of the Islands" / "Blue Turning Grey Over You"	OKeh 41375	
1930	"Exactly Like You" / "Indian Cradle Song"	Okeh 41423	
1930	"Memories of You" / "You're Lucky to Me"	Okeh 41463	
1930	"Dallas Blues" / "Bessie Couldn't Help It"	Okeh 8774	
1930	"Dinah" / "Tiger Rag"	Okeh 8800	
1930	"My Sweet" / "I Can't Believe That You're in Love with Me"	Okeh 41415	
1930	"Confessin' (That I Love You)" / "If I Could Be with You (One Hour To-Night)"	Okeh 41448	
1931	"Star Dust" / "Wrap Your Troubles in Dreams (And Dream Your Troubles Away)"	Okeh 41530	
1931	"The Lonesome Road" / "You Can Depend on Me"	Okeh 41538	
1931	"Blue Again" / "When Your Lover Has Gone"	Okeh 41498	
1931	"When It's Sleepy Time Down South" / "I'll Be Glad When Your Dead, You Rascal You"	OKeh 41504	
1931	"Just a Gigolo" / "Shine"	Okeh 41486	
1931	"Them There Eyes" / "Little Joe"	Okeh 41501	
1931	"Walkin' My Baby Back Home" / "I Surrender, Dear"	Okeh 41497	
1931	"You're Driving Me Crazy! (What Did I Do?)" / "The Peanut Vendor"	Okeh 41478	
1932	"I Got Rhythm" / "You Can Depend on Me"	Columbia 2590-D	
1932	"Lazy River" / "Georgia on My Mind"	Okeh 41541	
1932	"Between the Devil and the Deep Blue Sea" / "Kickin' the Gong Around"	Okeh 41550	
1932	"Body and Soul" / "Shine"	Columbia 2707-D	
1932	"Keeping Out of Mischief Now" / "Lawd, You Made the Night Too Long"	Columbia 2646-D	
1932	"Rockin' Chair" / "Sweethearts on Parade"	Columbia 2688-D	
1932	"Chinatown, My Chinatown" / "Star Dust"	Columbia 2574-D	
1932	"Home" / "All of Me"	Okeh 41552	
1932	"That's My Home" / "Hobo You Can't Ride That Train"	Victor 24200	
1933	"Mahogany Hall Stomp" / "High Society"	Victor 24232	
1933	"Mississippi Basin" / "Sweet Sue-Just You"	Victor 24321	
1933	"You'll Wish You'd Never Been Born" / "I Hate to Leave You Now"	Victor 24204	
1933	"Snow Ball / Honey, Do!"	Victor 24369	
1933	"St. Louis Blues" / "Dusky Stevedore"	Victor 24320	
1933	"Honey, Don't You Love Me Anymore?" / "There's a Cabin in the Pines"	Victor 24335	
1933	"I've Got the World on a String" / "Sittin’ in the Dark"	Victor 24245	
1933	"Medley of Armstrong Hits Part 1" / "Medley of Armstrong Hits Part 2"	Victor 36084	
1933	"He's a Son of the South" / "Some Sweet Day"	Victor 24257	
1933	"I Gotta Right to Sing the Blues" / "Hustlin' and Bustlin' for Baby"	Victor 24233	
1933	"I Wonder Who" / "Don't Play Me Cheap"	Victor 24425	
1934	"Laughin' Louie" / "Tomorrow Night"	Bluebird B-5363	
1935	"I'm in the Mood for Love" / "Got a Bran' New Suit"	Decca 579	
1935	"You are My Lucky Star" / "La Cucaracha"	Decca 580	
1936	"The Skeleton in the Closet" / "Hurdy Gurdy Man"	Decca 949	Louis Armstrong with Jimmy Dorsey & his Orchestra
1936	"I'm Shooting High" / "I've Got My Fingers Crossed"	Decca 623	
1936	"I Hope Gabriel Likes My Music" / "Shoe Shine Boy"	Decca 672	
1936	"Rhythm Saved the World" / "Mahogany Hall Stomp"	Decca 824	
1936	"Thanks a Million" / "Solitude"	Decca 666	
1936	"Somebody Stole My Break" / "I Come From a Musical Family"	Decca 797	
1936	"I'm Putting All My Eggs in One Basket" / "Yes-Yes! My-My!"	Decca 698	
1936	"If We Never Meet Again" / "Dipper Mouth"	Decca 906	/ Louis Armstrong with Jimmy Dorsey & his Orchestra
1936	"When Ruben Swings the Cuban" / "Red Nose"	Decca 1049	Louis Armstrong with Jimmy Dorsey & his Orchestra /
1936	"Old Man Mose" / "Falling in Love with You"	Decca 622	
1936	"Swing That Music" / "Thankful"	Decca 866	
1936	"The Music Goes 'Round and Around" / "Rhythm Saved the World"	Decca 685	
1936	"On Treasure Island" / "Red Sails in the Sunset"	Decca 648	
1936	"Lyin' to Myself" / "Ev'ntide"	Decca 835	
1937	"Cuban Pete" / "She's the Daughter of a Planter from Havana"	Decca 1353	
1937	"I've Got a Heart Full of Rhythm" / "Alexander's Ragtime Band"	Decca 1408	
1937	"Once in a While" / "On the Sunny Side of the Street"	Decca 1560	
1937	"Public Melody Number One" / "Red Cap"	Decca 1347	
1937	"Yours and Mine" / "Sun Showers"	Decca 1369	
1938	"Elder Eatmore's Sermon on Generosity" / "Elder Eatmore's Sermon on Throwing Stones"	Decca 15043	
1938	"Shadrack" / "Jonah and the Whale"	Decca 1913	
1938	"Let That Be a Lesson to You" / "Struttin' with Some Barbecue"	Decca 1661	
1938	"On the Sentimental Side" / "It's Wonderful"	Decca 1841	
1938	"As Long as You Live You'll be Dead if You Die" / "When the Saints Go Marching In"	Decca 2230	
1938	"I've Got a Pocketfull of Dreams" / "Naturally"	Decca 1937	
1938	"I Double Dare You" / "Satchel Mouth Swing"	Decca 1636	
1938	"Love Walked In" / "Something Tells Me"	Decca 1842	
1939	"Jeepers Creepers" / "What is This Thing Called Swing?"	Decca 2267	
1939	"Baby Won't You Please Come Home" / "Shanty Boat on the Mississippi"	Decca 2729	
1939	"If it's Good (Then I Want It)" / "West End Blues"	Decca 2480	
1939	"Savoy Blues" / "Me and Brother Bill"	Decca 2538	
1939	"Confessin' That I Love You" / "Our Monday Date"	Decca 2615	
1939	"Save It Pretty Mama" / "Hear Me Talkin' to Ya"	Decca 2405	
1939	"You're a Lucky Guy" / "You're Just a No Account"	Decca 2934	
1940	"Marie" / "Sleepy Time Gal"	Decca 3291	Louis Armstrong and the Mills Brothers
1940	"Bye and Bye" / "Poor Old Joe"	Decca 3011	
1940	"You Run Your Mouth, I'll Run My Business" / "Cain and Abel"	Decca 3204	
1940	"Sweethearts on Parade" / "Cut Off My Legs and Call Me Shorty"	Decca 3235	
1940	"Swing That Music" / "Wolverine Blues"	Decca 3105	Louis Armstrong with Jimmy Dorsey & his Orchestra /
1940	"You've Got Me Voodoo'd" / "Harlem Stomp"	Decca 3092	
1940	"Hep Cats' Ball" / "Lazy 'Sippi Steamer"	Decca 3283	
1941	"Long, Long Ago" / "I Cover the Waterfront"	Decca 3700	
1941	"I'll Get Mine Bye and Bye" / "Yes Suh!"	Decca 3900	
1941	"I Used to Love You" / "Leap Frog"	Decca 4106	
1941	"Ev'rything's Been Done Before" / "In the Gloaming"	Decca 3825	
1941	"New Do You Call That a Buddy" / "Hey Lawdy Mama"	Decca 3756	
1942	"(Get some) Cash for Your Trash" / "I Never Knew"	Decca 4229	
1942	"Among My Souvenirs" / "Coquette"	Decca 4327	
1945	"I Wonder" / "Jodie Man"	Decca 18652	
1946	"Endie" / "Do You Know What It Means to Miss New Orleans"	RCA Victor 20-2087	
1946	"Where the Blues Were Born in New Orleans" / "Mahogany Hall Stomp"	RCA Victor 20-2088	
1946	"Back O'Town Blues" / "Linger in My Arms a Little Longer, Baby"	RCA Victor 20-1912	
1946	"No Variety Blues" / "Whatta Ya Gonna Do"	RCA Victor 20-1891	
1947	"It Takes Time" / "I Wonder, I Wonder, I Wonder"	RCA Victor 20-2228	
1947	"You Don't Learn That in School" / "I Believe"	RCA Victor 20-2240	
1948	"I Want a Little Girl" / "Joseph and His Brudders"	RCA Victor 20-2612	
1948	"I Can't Give You Anything But Love" / "Ain't Misbehavin"	Decca 25355	
1949	"Blueberry Hill" / "That Lucky Old Sun"	Decca 24752	Louis Armstrong with Gordon Jenkins and His Orchestra
1949	"Maybe It's Because" / "I'll Keep the Lovelight Burning"	RCA Victor 24751	
1950	"La Vie en rose" / "C'est si bon"	Decca 27113	
1950	"Can Anyone Explain?" / "Dream a Little Dream of Me"	Decca 27209	Louis Armstrong with Ella Fitzgerald
1950	"Life is So Peculiar" / "You Rascal You"	Decca 27212	Louis Armstrong with Louis Jordan
1951	"(When We Are Dancing) I Get Ideas" / "A Kiss to Build a Dream On"	Decca 27720	
1951	"Cold, Cold Heart" / "Because of You"	Decca 27816	
1951	"Necessary Evil" / "Oops!"	Decca 27901	Louis Armstrong with Ella Fitzgerald
1951	"If" / "(I Wonder Why) You're Just in Love"	Decca 27481	/ Louis Armstrong with Velma Middleton
1951	"Gone Fishin'" / "We All Have a Song in Our Heart"	Decca 9-27623	Louis Armstrong with Bing Crosby / Bing Crosby only
1952	"It Takes Two to Tango" / "I Laughed at Love"	Decca 28394	
1952	"You're the Apple of My Eye" / "Big Butter and Egg Man"	Decca 27931	Louis Armstrong with Velma Middleton
1952	"Chlo-E" / "Listen to the Mocking Bird"	Decca 28524	Louis Armstrong with Gordon Jenkins and His Orchestra
1952	"Jeannine (I Dream of Lilac Time)" / "Indian Love Call"	Decca 28076	Louis Armstrong with Gordon Jenkins and His Orchestra
1952	"Kiss of Fire" / "I'll Walk Alone"	Decca 9-28177	
1952	"Once in a While / "Confessin' (That I Love You)"	Decca 9-28306	
1953	"'Zat You, Santa Claus?" / "Cool Yule"	Decca 28943	
1953	"Your Cheatin' Heart" / "Congratulations to Someone"	Decca 28628	
1953	"Sittin' in the Sun" / "Dummy Song"	Decca 28803	
1953	"Basin Street Blues - Part 1" / "Basin Street Blues - Concluded"	Decca 29102	
1953	"April in Portugal" / "Ramona"	Decca 9-28704	
1954	"Trees" / "Spooks!"	Decca 29352	Louis Armstrong with Gordon Jenkins and His Orchestra
1954	"On a Cocoanut Island" / "To You Sweetheart Aloha"	Decca 29117	
1954	"Skokiaan (Part 1)" / "Skokiaan (Part 2)"	Decca 33806	
1954	"The Whiffenpoof Song" / "Bye and Bye"	Decca 29153	
1955	"Sincerely" / "Pledging My Love"	Decca 29421	
1955	"Ko Ko Mo (I Love You So)" / "Struttin' with Some Barbecue"	Decca 29420	Louis Armstrong with Gary Crosby
1955	"Muskrat Ramble" / "Someday You'll be Sorry"	Decca 29280	Louis Armstrong with the Commanders
1955	"Moments to Remember" / "Only You"	Decca 29694	
1955	"Christmas in New Orleans" / "Christmas Night in Harlem"	Decca 29710	
1955	"Baby - Your Sleep is Showing" / "Pretty Little Missy"	Decca 29546	
1955	"Mack the Knife" / "Back o'Town Blues"	Columbia 4-40587	
1955	"St. James Infirmary / "Rockin' Chair"	RCA Victor 447-0067	
1955	"Basin Street Blues" / "When It's Sleepy Time Down South"	RCA Victor 447-0066	
1956	"High Society Calypso" / "Now You Has Jazz"	Capitol Records F3506	Louis Armstrong with Bing Crosby
1956	"Easy Street" / "Lazybones"	Decca 29921	Louis Armstrong with Gary Crosby
1956	"Can't We be Friends?" / "Stars Fell on Alabama"	Verve Records V-2023x45	Louis Armstrong with Ella Fitzgerald
1956	"Rain, Rain" / "I Never Saw a Better Day"	RCA Victor 47-6630	
1957	"The Prisoner's Song" / "I'll String Along with You"	Decca 25646	Louis Armstrong with Sy Oliver and His Orchestra
1957	"You're a Heavenly Thing" / "The Prisoner's Song"	Decca 30309	Louis Armstrong with Sy Oliver and His Orchestra
1957	"This Younger Generation" / "In Pursuit of Happiness"	Decca 9-30188	
1959	"The Five Pennies Saints" / "Just the Blues"	Dot Records 15941	Louis Armstrong with Danny Kaye
1959	"Onkel Satchmo's Lullaby" / "Only You (And You Alone)"	Decca 30980	Louis Armstrong with Gabriele /
1959	"The Beat Generation" / "Some Day You'll be Sorry"	MGM Records K12809	
1962	"Mack the Knife" / "The Faithful Hussar"	CBS CA 281.144 [France]	
1964	"Hello, Dolly" / "A Lot of Livin' to Do"	Kapp KL-1364 [US]	
1964	"So Long Dearie" / "Pretty Little Missy"	Mercury 72338	
1964	"Nomad" / "Summer Song"	Columbia 4-43032	Louis Armstrong with Dave Brubeck
1964	"Hello, Dolly" / "That's All I Want the World to Remember Me By"	Kapp K-2145	
1964	"Faith" / "Bye 'n Bye"	Mercury 72371	
1964	"I Still Get Jealous" / "Someday"	Kapp Records K-597	
1966	"Cabaret" / "Canal St. Blues"	Columbia 4-43819	
1966	"Mumbo Jumbo" / "Come Along Down"	Capitol Records 5716	Louis Armstrong with Guy Lombardo and His Royal Canadiens
1966	"Cheesecake" / "Bye 'n Bye"	Mercury 72371	
1967	"What a Wonderful World" / "Cabaret"	ABC 10982 [7-inch vinyl]	
1967	"Step Down, Brother, Next Case" / "Louie's Theme"	Brunswick 55328	
1967	"Daydream" / "Northern Boulevard"	Brunswick 55318	
1967	"Rosie" / "You'll Never Walk Alone"	Brunswick 55350	
1968	"I Will Wait for You" / "Talk to the Animals"	Brunswick 55380	
1968	"When You Wish Upon a Star" / "Heigh Ho"	Buena Vista Records F-470	
1968	"Hello Brother" / "The Sunshine of Love"	ABC Records 45-11126	
1968	"No Time is a Good Goodbye Time" / "We're a Home"	United Artists Records UA 50251	
1968	"The Life of the Party / You are Woman, I am Man"	Kapp Records K-901	
1968	"Wilkommen" / "The Happy Timen"	Brunswick 55360	
1969	"We Have All the Time in the World" / "We Have All the Time in the World"	IME 269870 [7-inch vinyl]	
1970	"We Shall Overcome - Part 1" / "We Shall Overcome - Part 2"	Amsterdam AM 85013	
1970	"Give Peace a Chance" / "The Creator Has a Master Plan (Peace)"	Amsterdam AM 85016	

=== Original albums ===
These LPs and EPs, studio and/or live recordings, were released during Armstrong's lifetime. The year and label information is for the first vinyl release, unless otherwise noted. Additional information, number of tracks, is given only when necessary to distinguish between different releases under the same title. In most cases, the number of CD releases is limited, with preference given to the label that originally released the album.

Year	Title	Label	CD release(s)	Credit (if not Louis Armstrong) and additional notes
1944	Jazz Classics	Brunswick B-1016		
1948	Louis Armstrong All Stars (Louis Armstrong's Town Hall Concert)	RCA Victor HJ-14		with Jack Teagarden; recorded at Fred Robbins' One-Nite-Stand event in Town Hall, New York City on May 17, 1947
1950	New Orleans Days	Decca DL 5279	Satchmo 50 (Decca, 2021)	Armstrong and The All Stars -10" album
1950	Jazz Concert	Decca DL 5280	Satchmo 50 (Decca, 2021)	Armstrong and The All Stars -10" album
1951	Satchmo at Symphony Hall	Decca DL 3087/8038		2-LP set; concert recorded November 30, 1947. No. 10 on Billboard's Most Popular Albums chart.
1951	Satchmo at Pasadena	Decca DL 8041		
1952	Satchmo Serenades	Decca DL 5401		
1954	Louis Armstrong Plays W.C. Handy	Columbia CL 591 (11 tracks)	Columbia: 1986 (12 tracks), 1997 (16 tracks), 1999 (16 tracks, SACD)	composer W. C. Handy
1954	Louis Armstrong and the Mills Brothers, Volume One	Decca ED 2113 (4 tracks)		Louis Armstrong & the Mills Brothers
1955	Satch Plays Fats	Columbia CL 708 (9 tracks)	Columbia: 2000 (SACD); Legacy: 2008 (CD); Sony Music: 2009 (CD); BBC Music Magazine.	composer Fats Waller
1955	Louis Armstrong at the Crescendo, Vol. 1	Decca		
1955	Satchmo Sings	Decca DL 8126		
1956	Louis Armstrong and Eddie Condon at Newport	Columbia CL-931		Louis Armstrong & Eddie Condon
1956	Satchmo the Great		Columbia: 1994, 2000; BBC Music Magazine.	songs are introduced by excerpts from interviews with Edward R. Murrow
1956	An Evening with Louis Armstrong and His All Stars..Vols 1 & 2			In Concert at the Pasadena Civic Auditorium
1956	Louis Armstrong and His All Stars – Ambassador Satch	Columbia CL 840	2009 Legacy: 88697492022; BBC Music Magazine.	December 1955 tour of Western Europe, concert recordings Amsterdam, Milan
1956	Ella and Louis	Verve MG V-4003	Verve: 1985, 2000, 2002 (SACD)	Ella Fitzgerald & Louis Armstrong
1957	Ella and Louis Again	Verve MGV 4006-2 [double LP]	Verve: 2003	Ella Fitzgerald & Louis Armstrong
1957	Louis Armstrong Meets Oscar Peterson	Verve [12 tracks]	Verve: 1997 (16 tracks)	Louis Armstrong & Oscar Peterson
1957	Louis Under the Stars	Verve MGV 4012		
1957	Louis and the Angels	Decca	Universal/MCA: 2000; Verve: 2001	
1958	Porgy & Bess	Verve MGV 4011-2 [double LP]	Verve: 1986; Verve Music Group: 2008; Essential Jazz Classics	Ella Fitzgerald & Louis Armstrong
1958	Louis and the Good Book	Decca DL 8741 [12 tracks]	MCA [France]: 1987, 1992; Verve [Germany]: 2001 (20 tracks)	
1959	Satchmo in Style	Decca		
1959	The Five Pennies	London SAH-U 6044		Danny Kaye & Louis Armstrong
1959	Satchmo Plays King Oliver	Audio Fidelity ST-91058		Louis Armstrong
1960	I've Got the World on a String	[10 tracks]		
1960	Bing & Satchmo	MGM E3882P	DRG: 2009	Bing Crosby & Louis Armstrong
1961	Recording Together for the First Time	Roulette SR52074 [10 tracks]		Louis Armstrong & Duke Ellington
1961	The Great Reunion			Louis Armstrong & Duke Ellington
1962	The Real Ambassadors	Columbia OL 5850 [15 tracks]	CBS: 1990 [20 tracks], 1994 [20 tracks]; Poll Winners: 2012 [25 tracks]	with Dave Brubeck, Carmen McRae, and Lambert, Hendricks & Ross
1964	Hello, Dolly!	Kapp KL-1364 [mono], KS-3364 [stereo]	MCA: 2000	
1968	Here's Louis Armstrong	MCA & MCA Coral		Cat# VL7-3851
1968	Disney Songs the Satchmo Way	Buena Vista STBV 4044	Walt Disney: 1996, 2001	
1968	I Will Wait for You	Brunswick BL 754136		
1968	What a Wonderful World	ABC ABCS 650		
1969	The One and Only	Vocalion VL 73871		
1970	Louis 'Country & Western' Armstrong	Avco Embassy Records AVE-33022		
1971	Louis Armstrong and His Friends	Flying Dutchman Records AM 12009		

=== Posthumous releases, complete editions, anthologies released after Armstrong's death (1971). ===
- Portrait of the Artist as a Young Man: 1923-1934 (Legacy / Columbia, 1994; Sony Music, 2001)
- Louis Armstrong Hot Five and Hot Seven Sessions
  - Hot Fives & Sevens (JSP, 1998)
  - The Complete Hot Five & Hot Seven Recordings (Columbia/Legacy)
- Struttin' (Drive Archive, 1996) – 8 February 1947 concert with Edmond Hall's All-Stars
- The Complete Louis Armstrong Decca Sessions 1935–1946 (Mosaic Records, 2009)
- The Complete Louis Armstrong Columbia & RCA Victor Studio Sessions 1946–66 (Mosaic Records, 2021)
- The Complete Decca Studio Recordings of Louis Armstrong and the All-Stars (Mosaic Records, 1993)
- The Columbia & RCA Victor Live Recordings of Louis Armstrong & The All-Stars (Mosaic Records, 2013)
- The Complete Ella Fitzgerald & Louis Armstrong on Verve (1997) – repackaging of Ella and Louis, Ella and Louis Again, and Porgy and Bess
- Live in Amsterdam 1959 (Ais Records, 2011)
- Together For The First Time and The Great Reunion rereleases:
  - The Great Summit: The Master Takes (2001)
  - Louis Armstrong and Duke Ellington: The Great Summit/Complete Sessions (2000) – includes additional CD of alternate takes
- The Katanga Concert (Milan, 2000) – previously unreleased 1960.11 concert in Katanga (Africa) plus 17 tracks previously issued on the two earlier Milan CDs, Blueberry Hill (1962.06.17 in Nice, France) and What a Wonderful World: The Elizabethtown Concert (1960.11 in Elisabethville, Africa)
- Louis Armstrong in Prague Lucerna Hall 1965 (Panton, 1979) – reissued in CD in 2000 by Columbia
- The Legendary Berlin Concert (Jazzpoint, 2000) – 22 March 1965 concert with Billy Kyle, Tyree Glenn, Eddie Shu, Arvell Shaw and Danny Barcelona
- Louis In London (1968) (Verve Records/UMe, 2024)

=== Anthologies ===
- Louis Armstrong's All Time Greatest Hits (MCA, 1994)
- 16 Most Requested Songs (Columbia/Legacy, 1994)
- The Definitive Collection (Hip-O/Verve, 2006)
- Louis Wishes You a Cool Yule (Verve Records/UMe, 2022)

== List of songs recorded ==
Chronology of the recordings of Armstrong's songs:

Song title	Year(s) recorded
Just Gone	1923-04-05
Canal Street Blues	1923
Mandy Lee Blues	1923
I'm Going Away to Wear You off My Mind	1923
Chimes Blues	1923
Weather Bird Rag	1923
Dipper Mouth Blues (Dippermouth Blues)	1923, 1946
Froggie Moore	1923
Snake Rag	1923
Sweet Lovin' Man	1923
High Society Rag	1923
Sobbin' Blues	1923
Where Did You Stay Last Night?	1923
Jazzin' Babies' Blues	1923
Buddy's Habit	1923
Tears	1923
I Ain't Gonna Tell Nobody	1923
Room Rent Blues	1923
Riverside Blues	1923
Sweet Baby Doll	1923
Workin' Man Blues	1923
Mabel's Dream	1923
Chattanooga Stomp	1923
London (Cafe) Blues	1923
Camp Meeting Blues	1923
New Orleans Stomp	1923
Manda	1924
Go 'Long, Mule	1924
Tell Me Dreamy Eyes	1924
My Rose Marie	1924
Don't Forget You'll Regret Day by Day	1924
Shanghai Shuffle	1924
See See Blues	1924
See See Rider Blues	1924
Jelly Bean Blues	1924
Countin' the Blues	1924
Texas Mooner Blues	1924
Early in the Morning	1924
Of All the Wrongs You've Done to Me	1924
One of These Days	1924
My Dream Man	1924
The Meanest Kind of Blues	1924
Naughty Man	1924
How Come You Do Me Like You Do	1924
Araby (The Sheik of Araby)	1924
Everybody Loves My Baby	1924
Papa, Mama's All Alone Blues	1924
Changeable Daddy of Mine	1924
Terrible Blues	1924
Santa Claus Blues	1924
Baby I Can't Use You No More	1924
Trouble Everywhere I Roam	1924
Prince of Wails	1924
Mandy Make Up Your Mind	1924
Poor House Blues	1924
Anybody Here Want to Try My Cabbage	1924
Thunderstorm Blues	1924
If I Lose, Let Me Lose (Mama Don't Mind)	1924
Screamin' the Blues	1924
Good Time Flat Blues	1924
I'm a Little Blackbird Looking for a Bluebird	1924
Nobody Knows the Way I Feel Dis Mornin'	1924
Early Every Morn	1924
You've Been a Good Ole Wagon	1925
I'll See You in My Dreams	1925
Sobbin' Hearted Blues	1925
Cold in Hand Blues	1925
Why Couldn't It Be Poor Little Me?	1925
Bye and Bye	1925
Play Me Slow	1925
Alabamy Bound	1925
Swanee Butterfly	1925
Poplar Street Blues	1925
12th Street Blues	1925
Me Neenyah (My Little One)	1925
You've Got to Beat Me to Keep Me	1925
Mining Camp Blues	1925
Cast Away	1925
Papa De-Da-Da	1925
The World's Jazz Crazy and So Am I	1925
Railroad Blues	1925
Shipwrecked Blues	1925
Court House Blues	1925
My John Blues	1925
Memphis Bound	1925
When You Do What You Do	1925
Just Wait 'Til You See My Baby Do the Charleston	1925
Livin' High Sometimes	1925
Coal Cart Blues	1925
T N T	1925
Carolina Stomp	1925
Squeeze Me	1925, 1928
You Can't Shush Katie (The Gabbiest Girl in Town)	1925
Lucy Long	1925
I Ain't Gonna Play No Second Fiddle	1925
Low Land Blues	1925
Kid Man Blues	1925
Lazy Woman's Blues	1925
Lonesome Lovesick	1925
Gambler's Dream	1925
Sunshine Baby	1925
Adam and Eve Had the Blues	1925
Put it Where I Can Get it	1925
Washwoman Blues	1925
I've Stopped My Man	1925
My Heart	1925-11-12
Yes! I'm in the Barrel	1925-11-12
Gut Bucket Blues	1925-11-12
Come Back Sweet Papa	1926
Lonesome, All Alone and Blue	1926
Trouble in Mind	1926
A Georgia Man	1926
You've Got to Go Home On Time	1926
What Kind o' Man Is That	1926
Deep Water Blues	1926
G'wan, I Told You	1926
Lonesome hours	1926
Georgia Grind	1926
Heebie Jeebies	1926
Cornet Chop Suey	1926
Oriental Strut	1926
You're Next	1926
Muskrat Ramble	1926
A Jealous Woman Like Me	1926
Special Delivery Blues	1926
Jack O'Diamond Blues	1926
The Mail Train Blues	1926
I Feel Good	1926
A Man for Every Day of the Week	1926
After I Say I'm Sorry	1926
Georgia Bo Bo	1926
Static Strut	1926
Stomp Off, Let's Go	1926
Drop That Sack	1926
Willie the Weeper	1927
Wild Man Blues	1927
Melancholy	1927
Dead Drunk Blues	1927
Have You Ever Been Down?	1927
Lazy Man Blues	1927
The Flood Blues	1927
Chicago Breakdown	1927
Alligator Crawl	1927
Potato Head Blues	1927
Weary Blues	1927
Twelfth Street Rag	1927
Keyhole Blues	1927
S. O. L. Blues	1927
Gully Low Blues	1927
That's When I'll Come Back to You	1927
The Last Time	1927
Struttin' with Some Barbeque	1927
Got No Blues	1927
Once in a While	1927
I'm Not Rough	1927
Hotter Than That	1927
Savoy Blues	1927
A Monday Date	1928
Don't Jive Me	1928
West End Blues	1928
Sugar Foot Strut	1928
Two Deuces	1928
Save It Pretty Mama	1928
Weather Bird	1928
Muggles	1928
I Can't Give You Anything But Love	1928
Baby!	1928
Sweethearts on Parade	1928
I Must Have That Man!	1928
I Heah Me Talkin' to Ya?	1928
St. James Infirmary	1928
St. James Infirmary Blues	1928
Tight Like This	1928
Knockin' a Jug	1929
Mahogany Hall Stomp	1929
S'Posin'	1929
To Be in Love (Espesh'lly With You)	1929
Funny Feathers	1929
How Do You Do It That Way?	1929
When You're Smiling	1929
After You've Gone	1929
I Ain't Got Nobody	1929
Dallas Blues	1929
Saint Louis Blues	1929
Rockin' Chair	1929
Ain't Misbehavin'	1929
Song of the Islands	1930-01-24
What It Takes to Bring You Back	1930
Bessie Couldn't Help It	1930-02-01
Blue Turning Grey Over You	1930-02-01
Dear Old Southland	1930-04-05, 1947
My Sweet	1930-04-05
I Can't Believe That You're in Love with Me	1930-04-05 1956-12-11
I'm a Ding Dong Daddy (from Dumas)	1930-07-21
If I Could Be with You (One Hour Tonight)	1930-08-19
Ex-Flame	1930
Body and Soul	1930-10-09
Memories of You	1930-10-16
You're Lucky to Me	1930-10-16
Sweethearts on Parade	1930-12-23
Just a Gigolo	1931-03-09
Shine	1931
Walkin' My Baby Back Home	1931
I Surrender Dear	1931
When It's Sleepy Time Down South	1931, 1944
Blue Again	1931
Little Joe	1931
I'll Be Glad When You're Dead You Rascal You	1931
Them There Eyes	1931
When Your Lover Has Gone	1931
Lazy River ((Up A) Lazy River)	1931
Chinatown, My Chinatown	1931, 1932
You Can Depend on Me	1931
Georgia on My Mind	1931
The Lonesome Road	1931
I Got Rhythm	1931
Between the Devil and the Deep Blue Sea	1932
Kickin' the Gong Around	1932
All of Me	1932
Rhapsody in Black and Blue	1932
High Society	1932, 1933
That's My Home	1932
Hobo, You Can't Ride This Train	1932
I Hate to Leave You Now	1932
You'll Wish You'd Never Been Born	1932
Love, You Funny Thing	1932 – charted in March
I've Got the World on a String	1933
I Gotta Right to Sing the Blues	1933
Hustlin' and Bustlin' for Baby	1933
Sittin' in the Dark	1933
He's a Son of the South	1933
Some Sweet Day	1933
Basin Street Blues	1933
Honey, Do!	1933
Snow Ball	1933
Swing You Cats	1933
I'm in the Mood for Love / You Are My Lucky Star	1935
Alexander's Ragtime Band	1937
Public Melody Number One	1937
When the Saints Go Marching In	1938, 1946
No Love No Nothing	1944
Is My Baby Blue Tonight	1944
Blues in the Night	1944
Keep on Jumpin'	1944
Harlem on Parade	1944
(Unknown titles)	1944-06-07
King Porter Stomp	1944
It's Love, Love, Love	1944
Whatcha Say	1944
Groovin'	1944
Baby Don't You Cry	1944
Louise	1944
Goin' My Way?	1944
Sweet and Lovely	1944
Is You or Is You Ain't My Baby	1944
Perdido	1944
Me and Brother Bill	1944
Swingin' on a Star	1944
Confessin'	1944
It Had to be You	1944
Solid Sam	1944
Dance with the Dolly	1944
I'll Walk Alone	1944
Jack-Armstrong Blues	1944
Confessin' That I Love You	1944
I Wonder	1945
Raymond Street Blues	1946
Flee as a Bird	1946
Shimme-Sha-Wabble	1946
Ballin' the Jack	1946
Brahms' Lullaby	1946
The Blues Are Brewin'	1946
Endie	1946
Do You Know What It Means to Miss New Orleans?	1946
Where the Blues Were Born in New Orleans	1946
You Won't Be Satisfied	1946 and 1947
Stompin' at the Savoy	1947
If I Loved You	1947
Mop Mop	1947
Back O'Town Blues	1947
Roll 'Em	1947
I Wonder, I Wonder, I Wonder	1947
I Believe	1947
Why Douby My Love?	1947
It Takes Time	1947
You Don't Learn That in School	1947
Reminiscin' with Louis	1947
Way Down Yonder in New Orleans and Intro	1947
2:19 Blues	1947
'Way Down Yonder in New Orleans	1947
Pennies from Heaven	1947
Royal Garden Blues	1947
Panama	1947
Someday You'll Be Sorry	1947
Tiger Rag	1947
Before Long	1947
Lovely Weather We're Having	1947
Black and Blue	1947
Lover	1947
On the Sunny Side of the Street	1947
Baby Won't You Please Come Home	1947
That's My Desire	1947
C-Jam Blues	1947
How High the Moon	1947
Boff Boff	1947
Blues from the Sky	1948
The Flat Footed Foogie	1948
I Ain't Gonna Give Nobody None of My Jelly	1948
Roll	1948
Blue Skies	1948
Velma's Blues	1948
I Cried Last Night	1948
Steak Face	1948
Boogie Woogie on St. Louis Blues	1948
Stars Fell on Alabama	1948
Buzz Me Baby	1948
Tea for Two	1948
Someone to Watch over Me	1948
Honeysuckle Rose	1948
The One I Love Belongs to Someone Else	1948
Together	1948
Don't Fence Me In	1948
That's a Plenty	1948
East of the Sun	1948
Tin Roof Blues	1948
Little White Lies	1948
Shadrack / When the Saints Go Marching In	1948
Maybe You'll Be There	1948
When We Are Dancing	1951
April in Paris	1956
Autumn in New York	1957
Oh Lawd, I'm On My Way	1957
Hello, Dolly!	1964
What a Wonderful World	1967
Zip-a-Dee-Doo-Dah	1968
Back Home Again in Indiana	1951
Big Butter and Egg Man	1926
Blueberry Hill	1947
C'est si bon	1950
Can't We Be Friends	1956
Cheek to Cheek	1956
Cold, Cold Heart	1951
Zat You Santa Claus	1953
Cool Yule	1953
Dream a Little Dream of Me	1950
El Choclo	1952
Frankie and Johnny	1959
Get Together	1970
Gone Fishin'	1951
The Gypsy in My Soul	1957
Hey Lawdy Mama	1941
High Society Calypso	1956
I Get Ideas	1951
It's Been a Long, Long Time	1964
Jeepers Creepers	1938
A Kiss to Build a Dream On	1951
Let's Call the Whole Thing Off	1957
Let's Do It, Let's Fall in Love	1957
Mack the Knife	1955
Moon River	1964
Moonlight in Vermont	1956
Nobody Knows the Trouble I've Seen	1938
Now You Has Jazz	1956
On a Little Bamboo Bridge	1937
On My Way	1958
Red Sails in the Sunset	1935
Skokiaan	1954
Sometimes I Feel Like a Motherless Child	1958
If We Never Meet Again	1930
Standing on the Corner (Blue Yodel No. 9)	1930
Stardust	1931
Takes Two to Tango	1952
That Lucky Old Sun	1949
They All Laughed	1957
Uncle Satchmo's Lullaby	1959
La Vie en rose	1950
We Have All the Time in the World	1969
Willow Weep for Me	1957
Winter Wonderland	1952
Makin' Whoopee	1957
I Get a Kick out of You	1957
Mame	1966

== References and sources ==
=== Sources ===
- Willems, Jos, All of Me : The Complete Discography of Louis Armstrong, Scarecrow Press, 2006, ISBN 978-0810857308
