= Satchmo at Pasadena =

- Cover of the 2009 Verve Records CD reissue

Live album by Louis Armstrong
- Released: 1951
- Recorded: January 30, 1951
- Venue: Pasadena Civic Auditorium, California
- Genre: Jazz
- Length: 48:05
- Label: Decca, Verve (reissue)

Louis Armstrong chronology
The Strip (1951)	Satchmo at Pasadena (1951)	Louis Armstrong Plays W.C. Handy (1951)

Satchmo at Pasadena is a live album by Louis Armstrong that was recorded at the Pasadena Civic Auditorium in 1951.

== Reception ==
Professional ratings
Review scores
Source	Rating
Allmusic	4/5 stars
Record Mirror	5/5 stars

Al Campbell at AllMusic gave the album four stars and said, "At the time of this concert, musicians began to take advantage of the new LP format that allowed them to bypass the usual three-minute time constraints of 78 rpm and stretch out a bit. Armstrong was no exception, and even though Satchmo is more of the ringleader/vocalist/showman on this set, the All-Stars provide some heated improvising, especially Hines on 'Honeysuckle Rose' and Bigard's clarinet solo on the otherwise knockabout version of 'Just You, Just Me.'" Campbell criticized the Verve Records CD reissue of the album for simply reissuing the program of tracks on the original LP rather than releasing the entire concert in the order in which it was performed.

== Track listing ==
1. "Back Home Again in Indiana" (James F. Hanley, Ballard MacDonald) – 5:31
2. "Baby, It's Cold Outside" (Frank Loesser) – 5:42
3. "Way Down Yonder in New Orleans" (Henry Creamer, Turner Layton) – 5:42
4. "Stardust" (Hoagy Carmichael, Mitchell Parish) – 3:33
5. "The Hucklebuck" (Roy Alfred, Andy Gibson) – 3:34
6. "Honeysuckle Rose" (Andy Razaf, Fats Waller) – 3:56
7. "Just You, Just Me" (Jesse Greer, Raymond Klages) – 6:22
8. "My Monday Date" (Earl Hines) – 6:37
9. "You Can Depend on Me" (Charles Carpenter, Louis Dunlap, Earl Hines) – 4:07
10. "That's a Plenty" (Lew Pollack) – 3:01

== Personnel ==
- Louis Armstrong – trumpet, vocals
- Jack Teagarden – trombone
- Barney Bigard – clarinet
- Earl Hines – piano
- Arvell Shaw – double bass
- Cozy Cole – drums
- Velma Middleton – vocals

Production

- Gene Norman – liner notes, producer
- Andy Kman – production coordination
- Ellen Fitton – mastering
- Harry Weinger – reissue supervisor
