= Nice Jazz Festival =

Music festival in Nice, France

Coordinates: 43°41′47″N 7°16′08″E

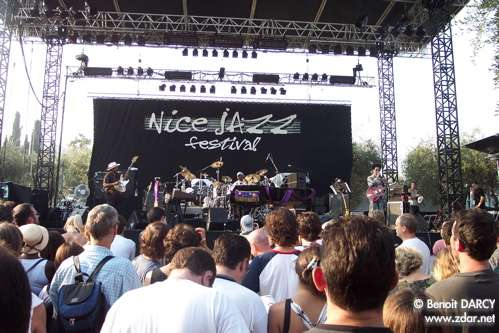
Nice Jazz Festival

Nice Jazz Fest (previously the Nice Jazz Festival), is an annual jazz festival first held in 1948 in Nice, on the French Riviera. After not running for several decades, it has been held annually since 1974.

== History ==
After first being held in 1948, the festival didn't return until 1971, when the International Jazz Festival (later known as Jazz à Juan) relocated from Juan-les-Pins to Nice. Nice hosted this festival for two years before it returned to Juan-les-Pins. Then in 1974 a new jazz festival began in Nice and both festivals were run separately.

From 1974 the Nice Jazz Festival was known as La Grande Parade du Jazz; in 1980 the name changed to JVC Nice Jazz Festival; in 1993 it changed to the Nice Jazz Festival; and since 2024 it has been known as Nice Jazz Fest.

It is considered "the first jazz festival of international significance" and "the biggest, flashiest, and most prestigious jazz festival in Europe."

At the inaugural festival, Louis Armstrong and his All Stars were the headliners. Armstrong later recorded C'est si bon after hearing it sang by Suzy Delair during her performance.

Other artists present in 1948 included: George Barnes, Barney Bigard, Ruby Braff, Francis Burger, Sid Catlett, Suzy Delair, Baby Dodds, Challain Ferret, Stéphane Grappelli, Earl Hines, Jean Leclère, Claude Luter, Mezz Mezzrow, Velma Middleton, Yves Montand, Michael Moore, Joseph Reinhardt, Arvell Shaw, Jimmy Skidmore, Emmanuel Soudieux, Rex Stewart, Jack Teagarden, Louis Vola, and Wayne Wright.

Over the years, the festival has included notable artists, such as Lionel Hampton, Dizzy Gillespie, Ray Charles, Ella Fitzgerald, Helen Humes, Herbie Hancock, and Miles Davis.

After 1994, the festival saw a change of emphasis, with more world music and pop. But then by 2007, the festival's newest organizer Vivian Sicnasi, reinstated an eclectic mix of traditional and modern sounds with an international line-up, making it "one of the Riviera's biggest annual events."

From 1974 to 2010 the Nice Jazz Festival was held among the Roman ruins in Cimiez each year. In 2011, following years of falling attendance, the festival was moved from Cimiez to the more centrally located Place Masséna. It was reported that about 30,000 spectators attended the five-day festival in 2011, with daily attendance nearly doubling.

The 2016 Festival, scheduled to begin on 16 July, was cancelled in the wake of the truck attack on 14 July 2016.

For the 76th festival, in 2024 Nice Jazz Festival was renamed as Nice Jazz Fest, and took place in August.
