= Satch Plays Fats =

Studio album by Louis Armstrong and His All-Stars
- Released: 1955
- Recorded: 1955
- Genre: Jazz
- Label: Columbia
- Producer: George Avakian

Louis Armstrong and His All-Stars chronology
Louis Armstrong at the Crescendo, Volume 2 (1955)	Satch Plays Fats (1955)	Ambassador Satch (1956)

Satch Plays Fats: A Tribute to the Immortal Fats Waller by Louis Armstrong and His All-Stars is an album by the American musician Louis Armstrong, released in 1955. It was intended to be part of a series of "Plays" albums, before money issues ended the idea. Along with Louis Armstrong Plays W.C. Handy, the album marked a popular comeback for Armstrong's music. It peaked at No. 10 on Billboard's Popular Albums chart.

== Production ==
Armstrong and Fats Waller collaborated at least once, when they worked with the bandleader Erskine Tate, in 1925. Recorded in April and May 1955, Satch Plays Fats was produced by George Avakian; Waller had written the majority of the songs with Andy Razaf. Armstrong was backed by his All-Stars, which included Barrett Deems on drums, Barney Bigard on clarinet, Arvell Shaw on bass, Billy Kyle on piano, and Trummy Young on trombone. "All That Meat and No Potatoes" is a duet with Velma Middleton, who also sings on some of the other tracks. "Squeeze Me" is a version of the first composition for which Waller received a publishing credit. The version of "(What Did I Do to Be So) Black and Blue" continues to omit the first verse, creating, as The Village Voice noted of Armstrong's 1929 version, "an early protest anthem"; it also omits the earlier version's tuba and banjo. The version of "Ain't Misbehavin'" was captured in one take. Armstrong's scatting duet with Young's trombone on "I'm Crazy 'Bout My Baby and My Baby's Crazy 'Bout Me" was improvised during a recording take. The 1987 Columbia Jazz Masterpieces reissue used previously unreleased master recordings for six of the tracks. The 2000 reissue collected 1920s and 1930s recordings of many of the songs.

== Critical reception ==
Professional ratings
Review scores
Source	Rating
The Encyclopedia of Popular Music	3/5 stars
The Indianapolis Star	3.5/4 stars
Los Angeles Daily News	4/4 stars
Los Angeles Times	4/4 stars
MusicHound Jazz: The Essential Album Guide	4.5/5 stars
The Penguin Guide to Jazz on CD	3/4 stars
The Rolling Stone Album Guide	3/5 stars

The New York Times said that the album "reaches one of [jazz's] higher points ... it tops the Handy disk". The Richmond Times-Dispatch stated that "Satchmo chants the vocals with the gravelled-voice touch no other has matched." The News and Observer concluded that, aside from Waller, "the boys play Fats' music better than anyone else could". The Cincinnati Enquirer said that Armstrong "puts all the Fats feeling of jollity and bounce into this labor of love". The Cedar Rapids Gazette remarked that Armstrong "never plays better or sings with more pathos than he does on this set". The Chicago Daily Tribune opined, "While the Handy album is perfect, this is only nearly so, but not quite up to Armstrong's best." The Moncton Daily Times praised the "irrepressible, all-pervading spirit of fun" of Armstrong's vocals.

In 1987, The Washington Post noted that "Armstrong had a natural affinity for ... Waller's playfulness, [and] he was always able to capture the mood of a piece despite numerous technical flubs and, in some cases, flagging accompaniment." In 2000, the Los Angeles Times opined that "some of the original LP tracks [are] not up to the usual Armstrong standard... But the earlier pieces—'Black and Blue', 'Squeeze Me', 'Ain't Misbehavin'', etc.—are prime quality." The Los Angeles Daily News praised Armstrong's "warm vitality and playfulness". In 2001, The Village Voice called the album "one of Armstrong's most satisfying, and reveals how his sense of swing had deepened, as well as how it had been absorbed by his musicians."

== In culture ==
The protagonist of Ralph Ellison's Invisible Man, thinking over his life, contemplates the 1920s Armstrong recording of "(What Did I Do to Be So) Black and Blue", which was added to the 2000 reissue.

== Track listing ==
Side 1

1. "Honeysuckle Rose"
2. "Blue Turning Grey Over You"
3. "I'm Crazy 'Bout My Baby and My Baby's Crazy 'Bout Me"
4. "Squeeze Me"
5. "Keepin' Out of Mischief Now"

Side 2

1. "All That Meat and No Potatoes"
2. "I've Got a Feeling I'm Falling"
3. "(What Did I Do to Be So) Black and Blue"
4. "Ain't Misbehavin'"

== Charts ==
Chart (1955)	Peak position
US Billboard's Popular Albums	10
