= Louis Armstrong at the Crescendo, Vol. 1 =

Live album by Louis Armstrong
- Recorded: 21 January 1955
- Genre: Jazz
- Label: Decca – DL 8168

Concert at the Crescendo Vol. 1 is a 1955 jazz album by jazz trumpeter Louis Armstrong. The label states: "Actually Recorded at the Crescendo, January 21, 1955". Released as part of Decca's 4-disc set, "The California Concerts."

== Track listing ==
=== Side 1 ===
1. When It's Sleepy Time Down South
2. Jeepers Creepers
3. Tin Roof Blues
4. My Bucket's Got a Hole in It
5. Rose Room
6. Brother Bill (H. Sweet, Louis Armstrong)

=== Side 2 ===
1. Lazy River
2. T'ain't What You Do (with Trummy Young)
3. Perdido
4. Blues for Bass (Arvell Shaw)
5. Don't Fence Me In (with Velma Middleton)
6. Stompin' at the Savoy

== Personnel ==
- Louis Armstrong – Trumpet, vocals
- Barney Bigard – Clarinet
- Trummy Young – Trombone
- Billy Kyle – Piano
- Barrett Deems – drums
- Arvell Shaw – Double Bass
- Velma Middleton – vocals
