= The Great Summit =

The Great Summit: The Master Takes

Studio album by Duke Ellington and Louis Armstrong
- Released: 1961
- Recorded: April 3–4, 1961
- Studio: RCA Victor Studio One (New York City)
- Genre: Jazz
- Length: 1:07:23
- Label: Roulette (Blue Note)
- Producer: Bob Thiele

Duke Ellington chronology
Piano in the Foreground (1961)	The Great Summit: The Master Takes (1961)	Paris Blues (1961)

Louis Armstrong chronology
A Rare Batch of Satch (1961)	The Great Summit: The Master Takes (1961)	I Love Jazz (1962)

Together for the First Time
- Original album cover.

The Great Reunion
- Original album cover.

Professional ratings
Review scores
Source	Rating
AllMusic	5/5 stars

The Great Summit: The Master Takes is a 2001 Blue Note album by Duke Ellington and Louis Armstrong. It is a reissue of the two Roulette albums Together For The First Time (tracks 1–10) and The Great Reunion (tracks 11–17) from 1961. (These two albums have later resurfaced as a Roulette double-LP entitled The Duke Ellington/Louis Armstrong Years and in 1990 as a remastered CD called Together for the First Time/The Great Reunion.)

The contents of this album is an all-Ellington program performed by himself and Louis Armstrong & His All-Stars. These 17 selections are the entire result of the only studio meeting by Duke Ellington and Louis Armstrong. They both lead a small band - Louis Armstrong's All Stars - and play classic compositions by Ellington such as "Mood Indigo" and "Black and Tan Fantasy".

== The Great Summit: The Master Takes ==
All songs composed by Duke Ellington (except where otherwise stated).

1. Duke's Place — 5:03
  Lyrics by William Katz, Bob Thiele and Ruth Roberts.
2. I'm Just a Lucky So and So — 3:09
  Lyrics by Mack David.
3. Cottontail — 3:42
4. Mood Indigo — 3:57
  Co-composer is Barney Bigard with lyrics by Irving Mills.
5. Do Nothin' till You Hear From Me — 2:38
  Lyrics by Bob Russell.
6. The Beautiful American — 3:08
7. Black and Tan Fantasy — 3:59
  Co-composer is James "Bubber" Miley.
8. Drop Me Off in Harlem — 3:49
  Lyrics by Nick Kenny.
9. The Mooche — 3:38
  Lyrics by Irving Mills.
10. In a Mellow Tone — 3:48
  Lyrics by Milt Gabler.
11. It Don't Mean a Thing (If It Ain't Got That Swing) — 3:58
  Lyrics by Irving Mills.
12. Solitude — 4:55
  Lyrics by Eddie DeLange and Irving Mills.
13. Don't Get Around Much Anymore — 3:31
  Lyrics by Bob Russell.
14. I'm Beginning to See the Light — 3:37
  Co-composers are Don George, Johnny Hodges and Harry James.
15. Just Squeeze Me — 3:58
  Lyrics by Lee Gaines.
16. I Got It Bad (And That Ain't Good) — 5:31
  Co-composer is Paul Francis Webster.
17. Azalea — 5:02

== The Making of the Great Summit ==
On August 1, 2000, Blue Note released the compilation The Great Summit: The Complete Sessions, which contained the reissue above plus a second CD with alternate takes (rehearsals, false starts etc.). The alternate takes were digitally remastered in 2000.

1. In a Mellow Tone — 4:15
2. I'm Beginning to See the Light — 6:56
3. Do Nothin' till You Hear From Me — 5:42
4. Don't Get Around Much Anymore — 10:43
5. Duke's Place — 4:18
6. Drop Me Off in Harlem — 4:57
7. I'm Just a Lucky So and So — 4:37
8. Azalea — 8:05
9. Black and Tan Fantasy — 7:13
10. Band Discussion on Cottontail — 1:08

== Personnel ==
- Duke Ellington (piano)
- Louis Armstrong (trumpet, vocals)
- Barney Bigard (clarinet)
- Danny Barcelona (drums)
- Mort Herbert (bass)
- Trummy Young (trombone)

== Credits ==
- Bob Thiele (producer)
- Ray Hall (recording engineer)
- Arnold Meyers (cover photograph)
- Michael Cuscuna (reissue producer)
- Ron McMaster (remix and remaster)
