= Louis Armstrong Plays W.C. Handy =

Louis Armstrong Plays W. C. Handy

Studio album by Louis Armstrong and His All Stars
- Released: 1954
- Recorded: July 12–14, 1954
- Genre: Jazz
- Length: 76:37
- Label: Columbia
- Producer: George Avakian

Louis Armstrong and His All Stars chronology
Satchmo at Pasadena (1951)	Louis Armstrong Plays W. C. Handy (1954)	Satch Plays Fats (1955)

Professional ratings
Review scores
Source	Rating
Allmusic	5/5 stars
The Penguin Guide to Jazz Recordings	3.5/4 stars
Tom Hull	A

Louis Armstrong Plays W. C. Handy is a 1954 studio release by Louis Armstrong and His All Stars, described by Allmusic as "Louis Armstrong's finest record of the 1950s" and "essential music for all serious jazz collections". Columbia CD released the album on CD in 1986 in a much altered form, with alternative versions in place of many of the original songs, but restored the original with its 1997 re-issue, which also included additional tracks: a brief interview by the producer, George Avakian, with W. C. Handy; a joke told by Louis Armstrong; and several rehearsal versions of the songs.

== Track listing ==
=== Side 1 ===
1. "St. Louis Blues" (with Velma Middleton) (Handy) - 8:50
2. "Yellow Dog Blues" (Handy) - 4:16
3. "Loveless Love" (with Velma Middleton) (Handy) - 4:28
4. "Aunt Hagar's Blues" (Brymn, Handy) - 4:57
5. "Long Gone (From The Bowlin' Green)" (with Velma Middleton) (Handy, Chris Smith) - 5:08

=== Side 2 ===
1. "The Memphis Blues (Or Mister Crump)" (Handy, George A. Norton) - 2:59
2. "Beale Street Blues" (Handy) - 4:56
3. "Ole Miss Blues" (Handy) - 3:25
4. "Chantez Les Bas (Sing 'Em Low)" (Handy) - 4:48
5. "Hesitating Blues" (with Velma Middleton) (Handy) - 5:20
6. "Atlanta Blues (Make Me One Pallet on Your Floor)" (Dave Elman, Handy) - 4:33

=== 1997 CD bonus tracks ===
1. "George Avakian's Interview with W. C. Handy" - 2:44
2. "Loveless Love [Rehearsal Sequence]" (Handy) - 5:55
3. "Hesitating Blues [Rehearsal Sequence]" (Handy) - 5:38
4. "Alligator Story" - 0:47
5. "Long Gone (From The Bowlin' Green) [Rehearsal Sequence]" (Handy, Smith) - 7:53

== Personnel ==
- Louis Armstrong – trumpet, vocals
- Trummy Young – trombone
- Barney Bigard – clarinet
- Billy Kyle – piano
- Arvell Shaw – double bass
- Barrett Deems – drums
- Velma Middleton – vocals

Production

- George Avakian – producer, engineer, liner notes, reissue producer
- Mark Wilder – engineer, digital mastering
- Seth Rothstein – project director, project manager
- Rene Arsenault – production assistant
- Cozbi Sanchez-Cabrera – art direction, reissue art director
- Steven Berkowitz – reissue series
- Kevin Gore – reissue series
- Randall Martin – reissue design
