= Cozy Cole =

American jazz drummer (1909–1981)

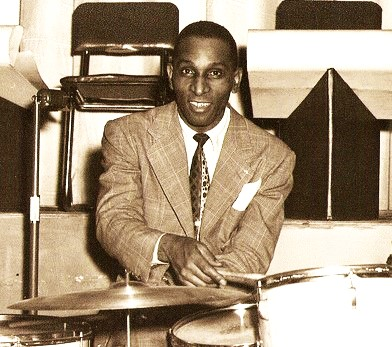
- Photo by Ralph F. Seghers

Background information
- Born: William Randolph Cole; October 17, 1909; East Orange, New Jersey, U.S.
- Died: January 29, 1981 (aged 71) Columbus, Ohio, U.S.
- Genres: Swing
- Occupation: Musician
- Instrument: Drums
- Years active: 1930s–1970s
- Formerly of: The Cab Calloway Orchestra

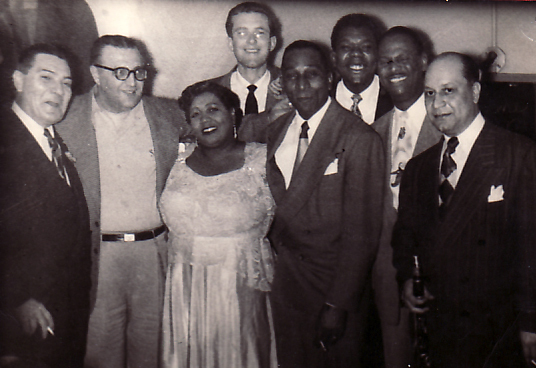
From left: Jack Teagarden, Sandy DeSantis, Velma Middleton, Fraser MacPherson, Cozy Cole, Arvell Shaw, Earl Hines, Barney Bigard at Palomar Supper Club, Vancouver, B.C. (March 17, 1951)

William Randolph "Cozy" Cole (October 17, 1909 – January 29, 1981) was an American jazz drummer who worked with Cab Calloway and Louis Armstrong among others and led his own groups.

== Life and career ==
William Randolph Cole was born in East Orange, New Jersey, United States. His first music job was with Wilbur Sweatman in 1928. In 1930, he played for Jelly Roll Morton's Red Hot Peppers, recording an early drum solo on "Load of Cole". He spent 1931–33 with Blanche Calloway, 1933–34 with Benny Carter, 1935–36 with Willie Bryant, 1936–38 with Stuff Smith's small combo, and 1938–42 with Cab Calloway. In 1942, he was hired by CBS Radio music director Raymond Scott as part of network radio's first integrated orchestra. After that he played with Louis Armstrong's All Stars.

Cole performed with Louis Armstrong and his All Stars with Velma Middleton singing vocals for the ninth Cavalcade of Jazz concert held at Wrigley Field in Los Angeles. The concert was produced by Leon Hefflin, Sr. on June 7, 1953. Also featured that day were Roy Brown and his Orchestra, Don Tosti and His Mexican Jazzmen, Earl Bostic, Nat "King" Cole, and Shorty Rogers and his Orchestra.

Cole had hits with the songs "Topsy I" and "Topsy II". "Topsy II" peaked at No. 3 on the Billboard Hot 100, and at No. 1 on the R&B chart. It sold over one million copies and was awarded a gold disc. The track peaked at No. 29 in the UK Singles Chart in 1958. The recording contained a long drum solo and was one of the few drum solo recordings to make the charts at Billboard magazine. The single was issued by Love Records, a small record label in Brooklyn, New York. Cole's song "Turvy II" reached No. 36 in 1959.

In 1959, Cozy performed at the Peacock Alley in St. Louis with his wife Lee Parker who was an entertainer. She studied dancing under Katherine Durham.

Cole appeared in music-related films, including a brief cameo in Don't Knock the Rock. Throughout the 1960s and 1970s he continued to perform in a variety of settings alongside names like Jonah Jones, Stuff Smith, and Cab Calloway. Cole and Gene Krupa often played drum duets at the Metropole in New York City during the 1950s and 1960s.

In 1978, Capital University in Columbus, awarded Cole an honorary degree of Doctor of Musical Arts. Cole is cited as an influence by many contemporary rock drummers, including Cozy Powell, who took his nickname "Cozy" from Cole. In 1981, he died of cancer in Columbus, Ohio.

Cole was the teacher of Philly Joe Jones.

== Discography ==
=== As leader ===
- 1944 The Chronological (Classics, ?)
- 1944-45 The Chronological (Classics, ?)
- 1944 Concerto for Cozy (Savoy, 1975)
- 1944-45 Hot and Cozy (Continental, 1962) – album shared with Hot Lips Page and Timmy Rosenkratz
- 1958 Earl's Backroom and Cozy's Caravan (Felsted, 1958) – album shared with Earl Hines
- 1961 A Cozy Conception of Carmen (Charlie Parker, 1962)
- The Drummer Man with the Big Beat (King, 1959)
- Cozy Cole Hits! (Love, 1959)
- It's a Cozy World (Coral, 1964)
- It's a Rocking Thing! (Columbia, 1966)
- Lionel Hampton Presents: Cozy Cole and Marty Napoleon (Who's Who in Jazz, 1977)
- Nice All Stars (Black and Blue, 1978)

=== As sideman ===
- Red Allen, Al Jazzbo Collins Jazz at the Metropole Cafe (Bethlehem, 1955)
- Red Allen, Ride, Red, Ride in Hi-Fi (RCA Victor, 1957)
- Red Allen, At Newport (Verve, 1957)
- Louis Armstrong, Satchmo On Stage (Decca, 1957)
- Cab Calloway, Hi De Ho Man (Columbia, 1974)
- Johnny Guarnieri, Tony Mottola, Bob Haggart, An Hour of Modern Piano Rhythms (Royale, 1959)
- Lionel Hampton, Who's Who in Jazz Presents: Lionel Hampton (Philips, 1977)
- Cass Harrison, Wrappin' It Up (MGM 1957)
- Earl Hines & Jonah Jones & Buddy Tate, Back On the Street (Chiaroscuro, 1972)
- Jonah Jones, Trumpet On Tour (Baronet, 1962)
- Wingy Manone, Wingy Manone Vol. 1 (RCA, 1969)
- Jimmy McPartland, Zutty Singleton, Miff Mole, Wild Bill Davison Dixieland at Carnegie Hall Forum (Circle, 1958)
- Jelly Roll Morton, Mr. Jelly Lord (RCA Victor, 1967)
- Sammy Price, Barrelhouse and Blues (Jazztone, 1955)
- Rex Stewart, Rex Stewart and the Ellingtonians (Riverside, 1960)

=== Singles ===
Year	Titles (A-side, B-side)	Chart positions			Album
Year	Titles (A-side, B-side)	US	US R&B	UK	Album
1958	"Topsy I" /	27		29	Cozy Cole Hits!
1958	"Topsy II"	3	1	29	Cozy Cole Hits!
1958	"Caravan"—Part 1 b/w Part 2 Original version				Cozy's Caravan
1958	"Turvy II" b/w "Turvy I"	36			Cozy Cole Hits!
1958	"St. Louis Blues" b/w "Father Cooperates"				Non-album tracks
1958	"Caravan"—Part 1 b/w Part 2 Re-recording				After Hours
1958	"Charleston" b/w "Late and Lazy"				Cozy Cole Hits!
1959	"Bad" b/w "(Everything Is) Topsy-Turvy"				Cozy Cole Hits!
1959	"Blop-Up" b/w "Blop-Down"				Cozy Cole
1959	""D" Natural Rock" b/w "Strange"				Cozy Cole
1959	"Soft" b/w "Melody Of A Dreamer"				Cozy Cole
1959	"Stained Glass" b/w "D'Mitri"				Cozy Cole
1960	"Ala Topsy 3" b/w "Ala Topsy 4"				Non-album tracks
1960	"Cozy's Mambo" b/w "Play Cozy Play"				Non-album tracks
1960	"Teen Age Ideas" b/w "Blockhead" (Non-album track)				Cozy Cole
1960	"Drum Fever" b/w "Bag Of Tricks"				Non-album tracks
1960	"Red Ball" b/w "Cozy's Corner"				Non-album tracks
1960	"Ha-Ha Cha-Cha" b/w "The Pogo Hop"				Non-album tracks
1961	"Bad" b/w "(Wow! Let's Rock That) Charleston"				Non-album tracks
1962	"Cozy's Groove"—Part 1 b/w Part 2				Non-album tracks
1962	"Big Noise From Winnetka"—Part 1 b/w Part 2	121			It's A Cozy World
1963	"Cozy and Bossa" b/w "Big Boss"				Non-album tracks
1963	"Indian Love Call"—Part 1 b/w Part 2				It's A Cozy World
1963	"Rockin' Drummer" b/w "Sing Sing Sing (With A Swing)"				It's A Cozy World
1964	"Topsy"—Part 1 b/w Part 2 Re-recordings				It's A Cozy World
1964	"North Beach" b/w "A Cozy Beat"				It's A Cozy World
1966	"Whole Lotta Shakin' Goin' On" b/w "Watch It"				It's A Rocking Thing!
