= Junior Barnard =

American Western swing guitarist (1920–1951)

- Born: Lester Robert Barnard; December 17, 1920; Coweta, Oklahoma, U.S.
- Died: April 15, 1951 (aged 30) Fresno County, California
- Genres: Western swing, jazz
- Occupation: Musician
- Instrument: Guitar
- Years active: 1930s–1950s

Lester Robert Barnard (December 17, 1920 – April 15, 1951), known as Junior Barnard, was an American Western swing guitarist who was a member of Bob Wills and his Texas Playboys. He was among the first electric guitarists to create a guitar effect that anticipated fuzz tone.

== Early life ==
Barnard was born into a musical family in Coweta, Oklahoma in 1920. Both his father, Hurl Lester Barnard and his uncle Robert played the fiddle and performed at barn dances and house parties. By the time he had reached 13 or 14 Junior had begun accompanying his father on guitar. His brother Gene was also an accomplished guitarist. At 15 Barnard began playing acoustic guitar with bands in the Tulsa area and he also had his own show on the KTUL radio station. In addition, he worked as a staff musician backing groups such as Patti Page and Her Musical Pages.

== Bob Wills ==
After a period of playing with fiddler Art Davis and the Rhythm Riders, Barnard was hired by Bob Wills to play with the Lonestar Rangers which was fronted by John Wills, Bob's father. This began an on-off relationship with the Wills family that was to last the rest of Barnard's life. In 1936 Bob Wills formed the Sons of the West which was led by his cousin Son Lansford and Barnard was drafted in as guitarist. Around a year later, by which time this band was based in Amarillo, Texas, Barnard had left and returned to Tulsa to work for radio station KTUL. In 1937 he bought his first electric guitar and later that year replaced Eldon Shamblin in Dave Edwards’ Original Alabama Boys, Shamblin having left to join the Texas Playboys. In 1938 Barnard was again part of the Wills organization this time playing guitar for The Rhythmaires led by Bob's brother Johnnie Lee. This lasted for six months before Barnard started playing with Wills’ father again in a band called Uncle John and his Young Five.

== World War II ==
By the time of America's entry into the war at the end of 1941, Barnard had recorded several sides with Johnnie Lee Wills for Decca and, as 1942 progressed, he was called upon by Bob Wills to join the Playboys as many of the band were being called up for military service. By the fall of that year Wills himself had enlisted in the Army. Barnard received a deferment because of his excessive weight and went to work as a welder at a defense plant in California.

== Guitar style and equipment ==
Barnard was one of the first guitarists to play in a style that deliberately incorporated a distorted guitar tone which he achieved by pushing low powered valve or tube amps to their limits. He developed a lot of techniques that are common amongst guitarists today such as fast runs, extreme string bends, hammer-ons and pull-offs. Barnard was also noted for his steady rhythm playing and chord use.

Barnard's main guitar during his time as a Playboy was a blond Epiphone Emperor arch top model which he inherited from Jimmy Wyble after he replaced Wyble in 1945. Barnard also used a Gibson ES-150 from time to time but it was the Epiphone that was to become his main instrument as he developed his style and modified his equipment to match it. The guitar was first electrified by Junior when he added a DeArmond pickup to neck position. At some point in 1947 a bridge position pickup was added by Leo Fender. This seems to be a lapsteel pickup as the strings actually pass through the pickup structure rather than over it. For this set up Junior began running two amplifiers, one for each pickup: an Epiphone and a Fender Pro model with 15 inch speaker. Eldon Shamblin recalled that both he and Junior used volume pedals when it was time to take a solo; it was never clear when Wills would like players to solo and with the volume control tucked away due to the design of the DeArmond pickup, the pedal became a time saving device. The Epiphone Emperor is now owned by guitarist Deke Dickerson.

== Death ==
On April 15, 1951, while scouting for places to play in Riverdale, California (south Fresno County), Barnard and his brother-in-law, Billie Earl Fitzgerald were killed in an automobile accident. Their car, which Barnard's wife Sue and his sister Betty were also riding in, collided with six members of the Cal Poly (San Luis Obispo) track team. Fitzgerald died instantly and Sue Barnard sustained head injuries. Junior Barnard died five hours later at Fresno County Hospital. He was 30 years old and left behind his wife and two sons. Junior was buried at Belmont Memorial Park in Fresno.

== Discography ==
- The Tiffany Transcriptions, Bob Wills (Collectors Choice)

Junior Barnard appeared on the following tracks in the Tiffany Transcriptions series:

The Tiffany Transcriptions Vol. 1

Nancy Jane/ Dinah/ Cotton Patch Blues /Sweet Jennie Lee/ I Hear You Talkin' /The Girl I Left Behind Me /Straighten Up And Fly Right /Little Betty Brown /Nobody's Sweetheart Now /Blackout Blues /What's The Matter With The Mill

The Tiffany Transcriptions Vol. 2

Take Me Back To Tulsa /Faded Love /Right Or Wrong /Bring It On Down To My House /Cherokee Maiden /Steel Guitar Rag /Stay A Little Longer /Roly Poly /Time Changes Everything /Ida Red /Maiden's Prayer /San Antonio Rose

The Tiffany Transcriptions Vol. 3

Basin Street Blues /I'm A Ding Dong Daddy /Milk Cow Blues /Please Don't Talk About Me When I'm Gone /It's Your Red Wagon /Good Man Is Hard To Find /Barnard Blues /I Never Knew /Baby Won't You Please Come Home

The Tiffany Transcriptions Vol. 4

Texas Playboy Theme/ You're From Texas /Lum & Abner Special (San Antonio Rose) /Texarkana Baby /Little Joe The Wrangler /Texas Plains /Home In San Antone /Blue Bonnet Lane /Along The Navajo Trail /Spanish Fandango /My Brown Eyed Texas Rose /Red River Valley /Texas Playboy Theme (Closing)

The Tiffany Transcriptions Vol. 5

My Window Faces The South /I Had Someone Else Before I Had You /Don't Cry Baby /Three Guitar Special /China Town /Fat Boy Rag /Sweet Kind Of Love /A Little bit of Boogie

Tiffany Transcriptions Vol. 6

Oklahoma Hills /Sally Goodin (Instrumental) /I Had A Little Mule /Playboy Chimes /Never No More Hard Times Blues /I'll Get Mine Bye And Bye /I'm Putting All My Eggs In One Basket /Oklahoma Rag /Sally Goodin

Tiffany Transcriptions Vol. 7

Keep Knockin' (But You Can't Come In) /Honeysuckle Rose/Worried Mind/Okie Boogie/C-Jam Blues/I Can't Go On This Way/Sweet Moments/My Gal Sal/I'm Gonna Be Boss From Now On/Lonesome Hearted Blues/Joe's Place/Sugar Blues/Too Long/Tea For Two

Tiffany Transcriptions Vol. 8

Miss Molly /Ten Years /Blues For Dixie /Twinkle Twinkle Little Star /Sun Bonnet Sue /Sitting On Top Of The World /There's Gonna Be A Party For The Old Folks /South /Trouble In Mind /Little Liza Jane /Sioux City Sue /My Confession /Get Along Home Cindy

Tiffany Transcriptions Vol. 9

Texas Playboy Rag /My Life's Been A Pleasure /G. I. Wish /Shame on you /You Don't Care What Happens /St. Louis Blues (Part One) /St. Louis Blues (Part Two) /Sentimental Journey /Back Home In Indiana

Tiffany Transcriptions Vol 10.

Betcha My Heart /I'm Crying My Heart Out /It's All Over Now /Jealous Hearted Me /Don't Sweetheart Me /Miss You I Want My Mama /I Dreamed Of An Old Love Affair /Echoes From The Hills /Hawaiian War Chant /When Day Is Done /Put Your Arms Around Me /Will There Be Any Yodeling In Heaven /Tumbling Tumbleweeds /To You Sweetheart Aloha /There's A Silver Moon On The Golden Gate /Pal Of My Lonely Hour
