= Cass Harrison =

American jazz musician

Cass Harrison is an American jazz pianist and composer. He had two trio albums released by MGM Records in the 1950s.

== Early life ==
Who's Who in Entertainment lists Harrison as being born in New York on April 25, 1917; the liner notes from his second LP, released in 1957, describe him as "thirtyish". He began playing the piano at the age of four.

== Later life and career ==
Harrison's first significant exposure as a professional musician came with Teddy Powell's band. Harrison played in Pennsylvania in 1944. In 1948, he played intermissions at Cafe James in New York. In 1954, he played with a singer at the Hotel Warwick in Philadelphia. He led a big band on a tour of South America prior to recording with his trio.

Harrison's first trio album, The Duke and I, consisting of versions of little-known Duke Ellington compositions, was released by MGM Records in 1956. The reviewer for Billboard wrote: "Harrison is an extremely gifted pianist who ought to be better known. He is technically facile, imaginative, fresh in his harmonic conception and possessed of one of the most rock-ribbed beats imaginable." The following year, this was followed by Wrappin' It Up, another trio release by MGM. Critic John S. Wilson described the performances as "a lightly swinging, unencumbered workout". Around 1960, Harrison led a trio performing at the Park Central Hotel in New York.

Harrison later moved to Puerto Rico. He was also a composer.

== Discography ==
=== As leader ===
Year recorded	Title	Label	Personnel/Notes
1956?	The Duke and I	MGM	Trio, with Mort Herbert (bass), Cozy Cole (drums)
1957?	Wrappin' It Up	MGM	Trio, with Milt Hinton (bass), Cozy Cole and Jo Jones (drums; separately)
	Sauce from the Source	Cass Harrison	
