= Drop Me Off in Harlem =

Song by Duke Ellington and Nick Kenny

Song by Duke Ellington and His Orchestra
- Published: 1933 by Mills Music
- Recorded: February 16, 1933
- Genre: Jazz
- Songwriter: Duke Ellington
- Composer: Duke Ellington
- Lyricist: Nick Kenny

"Drop Me Off in Harlem" is a 1933 song composed during the Harlem Renaissance by Duke Ellington, with lyrics written by Nick Kenny.

== Background ==
A.H. Lawrence writes that the song originated from an off the cuff remark from Ellington. Nick Kenny had hailed a taxi, and offered to share it with Ellington. Kenny asked "Where to, Duke?", and Ellington replied "Drop me off at Harlem". Kenny then fashioned lyrics from Ellington's remark and presented him with them a few days later at the Cotton Club.

== Recording ==
Drop Me Off in Harlem includes a number of solos. Ellington played a solo for piano in the introduction, followed by Lawrence Brown on trombone. There are several trumpet solos, performed by, in order: Arthur Whetsel, Freddie Jenkins, Whetsel, Cootie Williams, and then a clarinet solo by Barney Bigard.

== Credits ==
- Duke Ellington (piano, directing)
- Arthur Whetsel (first trumpet)
- Cootie Williams and Freddie Jenkins (trumpets)
- Lawrence Brown, Joseph Nanton (trombone)
- Juan Tizol (valve trombone)
- Otto Hardwick (first alto saxophone)
- Johnny Hodges (alto saxophone)
- Barney Bigard (tenor saxophone, clarinet)
- Harry Carney (baritone saxophone)
- Fred Guy (guitar)
- Wellman Braud (bass)
- Sonny Greer (drums)

== Critical reception ==
Drop Me Off in Harlem has been widely praised. It has been described as beguiling, as well as speaking to the freedom that Black Americans found in Harlem during the Harlem Renaissance.

== Notable recordings ==
- Duke Ellington and his Orchestra, February 16, 1933
- Ella Fitzgerald - Ella Fitzgerald Sings the Duke Ellington Songbook (1958)
- Duke Ellington and Louis Armstrong on The Great Summit (1961, re released 2001) This recording appeared in the 1989 film Harlem Nights.
- Richie Kamuca - Drop Me Off at Harlem (1975)
- Ran Blake - Duke Dreams (1981)
- Sun Ra - Nuclear War (1982)
- George Shearing Quintet - "Back To Birdland" (Telarc 2001)

== See also ==
- List of 1930s jazz standards
