= I'm Just a Lucky So-and-So =

Song by Duke Ellington

Song by Duke Ellington and Al Hibbler
- Recorded: November 26, 1945
- Genre: Jazz
- Length: 3:13
- Composer: Duke Ellington
- Lyricist: Mack David

"I'm Just a Lucky So-and-So" is a 1945 song composed by Duke Ellington, with lyrics written by Mack David. The song has become a jazz standard.

== Notable recordings ==
- Al Hibbler & Duke Ellington – recorded for RCA Victor (catalog No. 20-1799) on November 26, 1945 ( Johnny Hodges, Lawrence Brown, soloists).
- Eddie "Lockjaw" Davis & Shirley Scott – The Eddie "Lockjaw" Davis Cookbook Volume 3 (Prestige, 1958).
- Louis Armstrong & Duke Ellington – Together for the First Time (Roulette Records, 1961).
- Wes Montgomery on SO Much Guitar! (1961).
- Ella Fitzgerald – she first recorded it for Decca Records (catalog No. 18814) in New York on Feb 21, 1946. She sang it at Carnegie Hall in 1949 and it was included in Jazz at the Philharmonic, The Ella Fitzgerald Set (Verve/Polygram)" (1949). A later recording was included in Ella Fitzgerald Sings the Duke Ellington Songbook (1958).
- Sarah Vaughan – The Duke Ellington Songbook, Vol. 1 (1979).
- Mose Allison – Middle Class White Boy (1982).
- Harry "Sweets" Edison & Eddie "Lockjaw" Davis – Jazz at the Philharmonic (1983).
- Diana Krall – for her album Stepping Out (1993).

== Legacy ==
Just a Lucky So and So: The Story of Louis Armstrong, a 2016 picture book biography of Louis Armstrong, was titled after the song. The book was written by Lesa Cline-Ransome and illustrated by her husband, James Ransome.
