= Gypsy in Jazz =

Studio album by Teddy Wilson and His Trio
- Released: 1959
- Genre: Jazz
- Label: Columbia

Professional ratings
Review scores
Source	Rating
AllMusic	3/5 stars

Gypsy in Jazz is a jazz album recorded by Teddy Wilson and His Trio in 1959 and released by Columbia as CL 1352 (mono) and CS 8160 (stereo). The album is an example of a once-common practice, a hit Broadway show rendered in the jazz idiom for an audience who were not hard-core jazz fans, but casual music listeners willing to broaden their horizons within a familiar context. The recording was released in Australia in 1963 shortly before the premier of Gypsy in Melbourne. Scott Yanow observed that the album departs from Wilson's usual playlist to interesting effect, but lamented the unavailability of the recording.

== Personnel ==
- Teddy Wilson – piano
- Arvell Shaw – bass
- Bert Dahlender – drums

== Track listing ==
1. "All I Need Is the Girl"
2. "You'll Never Get Away from Me"
3. "Small World"
4. "Little Lamb"
5. "Together Wherever We Go"
6. "Everything's Coming Up Roses"
7. "Some People"
8. "Mama's Talkin' Soft"
9. "Cow Song"
10. "If Mama Was Married"
11. "Let Me Entertain You"
12. "Mr. Goldstone, I Love You"
