= The Eddie "Lockjaw" Davis Cookbook Volume 3 =

Studio album by Eddie "Lockjaw" Davis with Shirley Scott and Jerome Richardson
- Released: 1960
- Recorded: September 12 and December 5, 1958; Van Gelder Studio, Hackensack
- Genre: Jazz
- Length: 38:27
- Label: Prestige; PR 7219
- Producer: Esmond Edwards

Eddie "Lockjaw" Davis chronology
The Eddie "Lockjaw" Davis Cookbook, Vol. 2 (1959)	The Eddie "Lockjaw" Davis Cookbook Volume 3 (1960)	Smokin' (1964)

Shirley Scott chronology
The Eddie "Lockjaw" Davis Cookbook, Vol. 2 (1959)	The Eddie "Lockjaw" Davis Cookbook Volume 3 (1960)	Smokin' (1964)

Professional ratings
Review scores
Source	Rating
Allmusic	3/5 stars
The Penguin Guide to Jazz Recordings	3.5/4 stars

The Eddie "Lockjaw" Davis Cookbook Volume 3 is an album by saxophonist Eddie "Lockjaw" Davis with organist Shirley Scott recorded in 1958 for the Prestige label. The album was the third of Davis' popular "Cookbook" volumes to be released.

== Reception ==
The Allmusic review awarded the album 3 stars and stated "Scott shows that she was one of the top organists to emerge after the rise of Jimmy Smith. But Davis is the main star, and his instantly recognizable sound is the most memorable aspect of this swinging session".

== Track listing ==
All compositions by Eddie "Lockjaw" Davis and Shirley Scott except as indicated

1. "I'm Just a Lucky So-and-So" (Mack David, Duke Ellington) - 6:12
2. "Heat 'n' Serve" - 7:20
3. "My Old Flame" (Sam Coslow, Arthur Johnston) - 6:01
4. "The Goose Hangs High" - 5:52
5. "Simmerin'" - 9:25
6. "Strike Up the Band" (George Gershwin, Ira Gershwin) - 3:37
- Recorded at Van Gelder Studio in Hackensack, New Jersey on September 12 (tracks 1 & 6) and December 5 (tracks 2–5), 1958

== Personnel ==
- Eddie "Lockjaw" Davis - tenor saxophone
- Shirley Scott - organ
- Jerome Richardson - flute (tracks 4 & 5), baritone saxophone (track 2), tenor saxophone (track 3)
- George Duvivier - bass
- Arthur Edgehill - drums
