= Trummy Young =

American jazz trombonist (1912–1984)

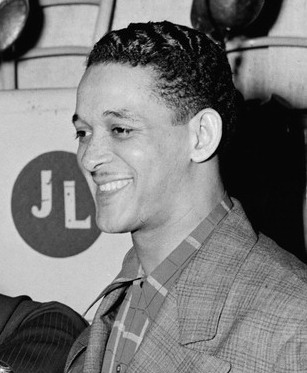
- Trummy Young, c. early 1940s

Background information
- Born: James Osborne Young; January 12, 1912; Savannah, Georgia, U.S.
- Died: September 10, 1984 (aged 72) San Jose, California, U.S.
- Genre: Jazz
- Occupation: Musician
- Instrument: Trombone
- Years active: 1928–1964

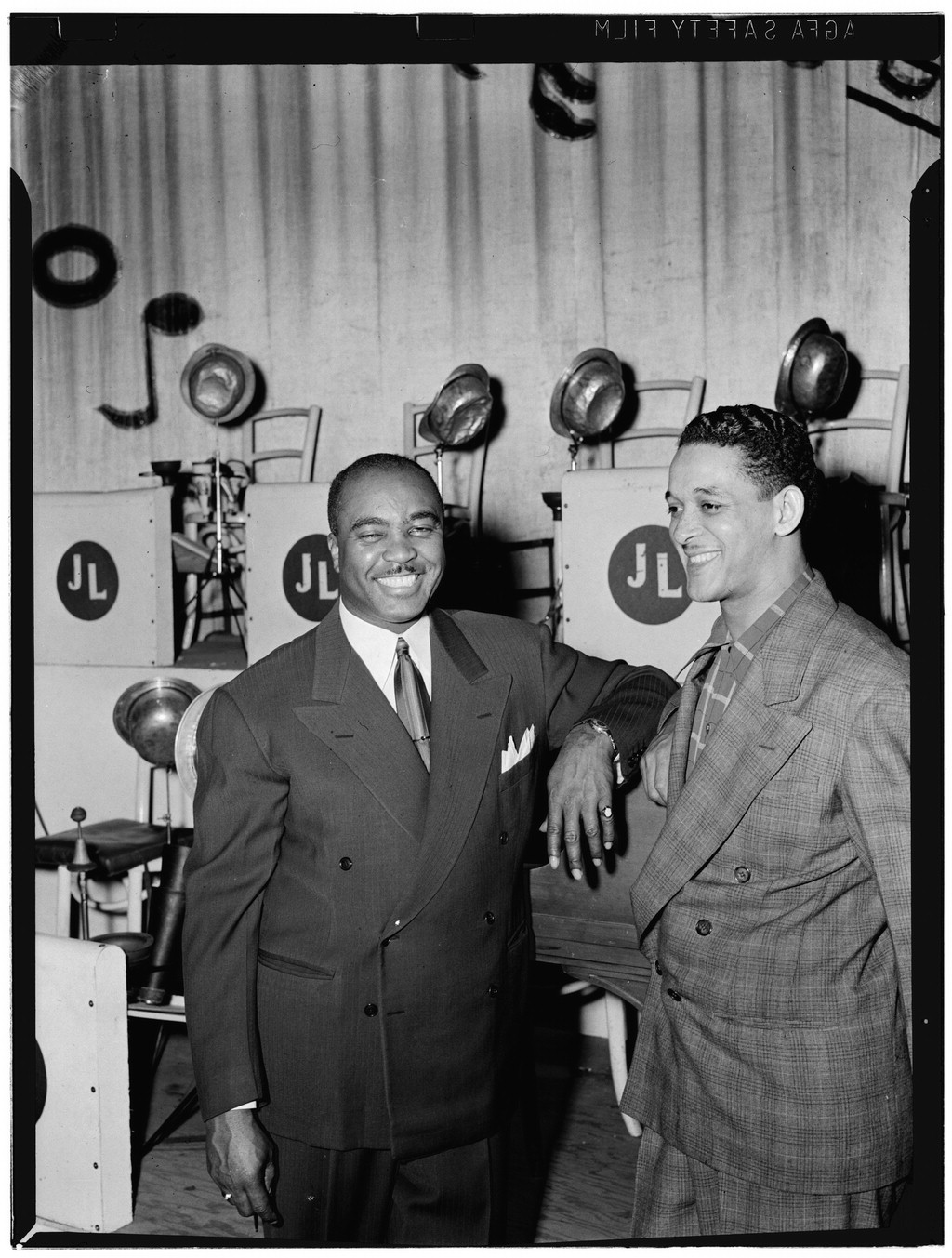
Trummy Young (right) and Jimmie Lunceford, early 1940s

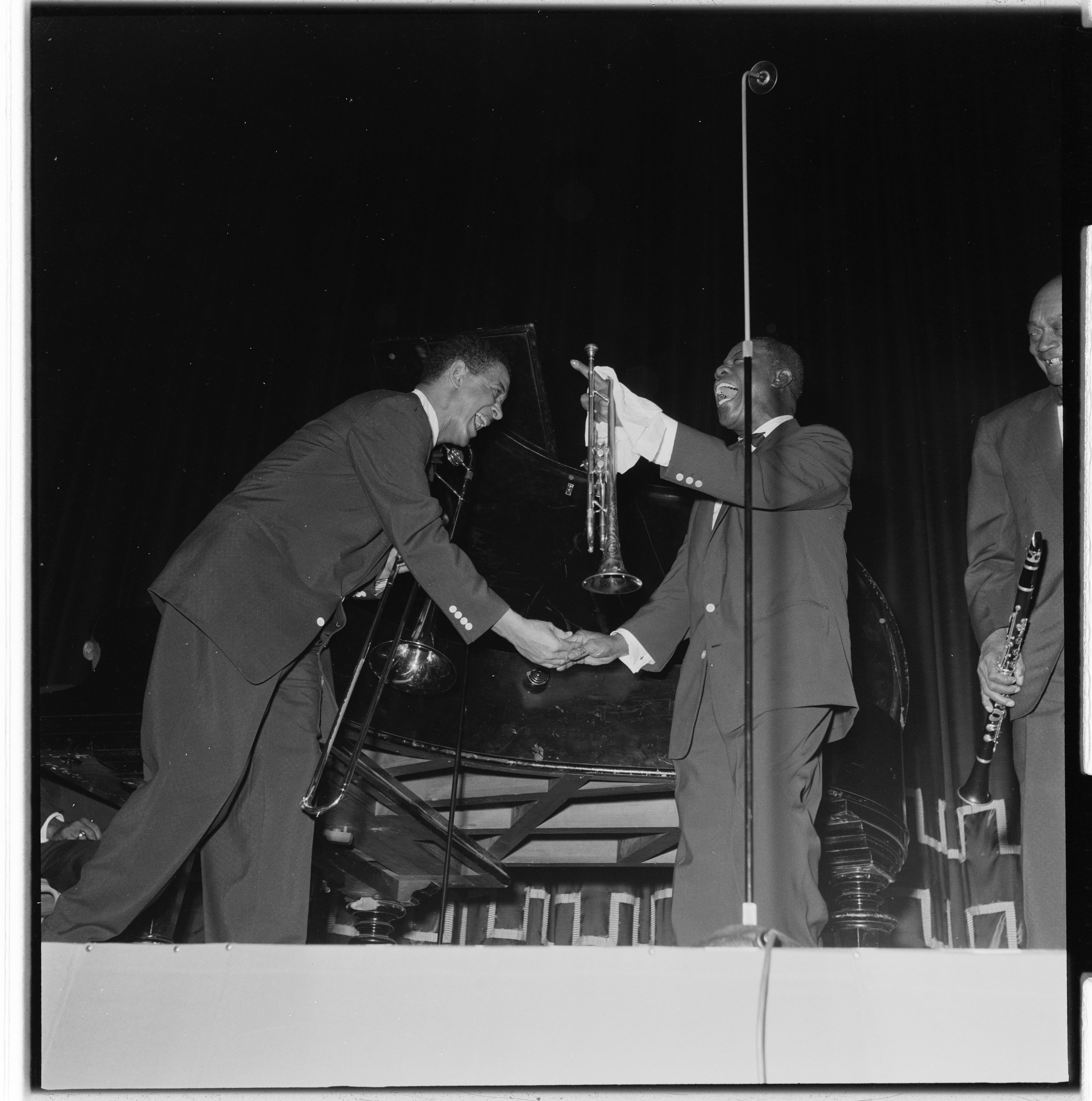
Young, left, shaking hands with Louis Armstrong at a 1955 concert in Oslo

James "Trummy" Young (January 12, 1912 – September 10, 1984) was an American trombonist in the swing era. He established himself as a star during his 12 years performing with Louis Armstrong in Armstrong's All Stars. He had one hit with his version of "Margie", which he played and sang with Jimmie Lunceford's orchestra in 1937. During his years with Armstrong, Young modified his playing to fit Armstrong's approach to jazz.

== Biography ==
Young was born in Savannah, Georgia, United States, and grew up Richmond, Virginia; he was originally a trumpeter, but by his professional debut in 1928 he had switched to trombone. From 1933 to 1937, he was a member of Earl Hines' orchestra; he then joined Jimmie Lunceford's orchestra in which he played from 1937 to 1943, scoring a hit on Decca Records with "Margie", which featured his vocal. With Sy Oliver he co-wrote "'Tain't What You Do (It's the Way That You Do It)", a hit for both Lunceford and Ella Fitzgerald in 1939. His other compositions include "Easy Does It" (1939; co-written with Oliver) and "Trav'lin' Light" (1942; co-written with Jimmy Mundy, with lyrics by Johnny Mercer).

Young joined Benny Goodman in 1945 and soloed on several hit records, including the No. 2 hit "Gotta Be This or That". He also played with Charlie Parker and Dizzy Gillespie on a Clyde Hart-led session in 1945, and with Jazz at the Philharmonic. In September 1952, he joined the Louis Armstrong All-Stars and stayed for twelve years (he performed in the musical film, High Society (1956). He appeared in the Universal-International biopic, The Glenn Miller Story (1954), with Louis Armstrong, Gene Krupa, and Barney Bigard. Young performed with Louis Armstrong and his All Stars for the ninth Cavalcade of Jazz concert held at Wrigley Field in Los Angeles. The concert was produced by Leon Hefflin, Sr. on June 7, 1953. Trummy Young was a good foil for the trumpeter (such as their version of "St. Louis Blues" on Armstrong's W.C. Handy tribute album). In 1964, Young ceased touring in order to settle in Hawaii, occasionally emerging for jazz parties and special appearances.

According to his own life story, printed in the July 22, 1977, issue of the Awake! magazine, published by Jehovah's Witnesses, he became a Jehovah's Witness in 1964. He was married to Sally Tokashiki with whom he had two daughters, Andrea (who is a jazz singer) and Barbara.

He died after a cerebral hemorrhage at the age of 72 in September 1984.

== Discography ==
- Jimmie Lunceford in Hi-Fi, Billy May and His Orchestra (Capitol, 1957)
- The Mildred Bailey Radio Show 1944–1945, Mildred Bailey (Sunbeam, 1975)
- A Man and His Horn (Flair, 1975)
- Oleo, Urbie Green, Ross Tompkins, Carl Fontana, Kai Winding, James Moody, Dick Hyman, Trummy Young (Pausa, 1978)
- Swing Is Here, Chris Barber (Black Lion, 1979)
- Someday (Chiaroscuro, 1980)
- Los Grandes Del Jazz 68, Louis Armstrong, Peanuts Hucko, Trummy Young, Billy Kyle (Sarpe, 1981)
- Satchmo Plays King Oliver, Louis Armstrong, Peanuts Hucko, Trummy Young, Billy Kyle (Curcio, 1982)
- Tribute to Louis Armstrong, Peanuts Hucko, Billy Butterfield, Trummy Young, Marty Napoleon, Jack Lesberg, Gus Johnson (Jazz Heritage, 1985)

With Buck Clayton

- How Hi the Fi (Columbia, 1954)
- Jumpin' at the Woodside (Columbia, 1955)
