= Blue Turning Grey over You =

1929 jazz standard by Fats Waller and Andy Razaf

"Blue, Turning Grey over You" is a 1929 jazz standard. The music was composed by Fats Waller, with lyrics by Andy Razaf. Fats Waller recorded the song for Victor Records (catalog No. 25779) on June 9, 1937.

== Earlier recordings ==
- Louis Armstrong recorded a version for Okeh Records (catalog No. 41375) on February 1, 1930 and he recorded it again in 1955 for the album Satch Plays Fats.
- Lee Morse recorded a version for Columbia Records in 1930.

== Other notable recordings ==
- Harry James recorded live versions of the tune in the mid-1940s that were released on the albums The Uncollected Harry James And His Orchestra, 1943-1946 Vol. 2 (Hindsight HSR-123, 1978), One Night Stand With Harry James on Staten Island (Joyce LP-1046, 1979), and Harry James: The Post War Period (JRC-1207).
- Maxine Sullivan - for her album A Tribute to Andy Razaf (1956).
- Frankie Laine included the song in his album Rockin' (1957).
- Kenny Ball and His Jazzmen - for the album Kenny Ball and His Jazzmen (1961).
- Billie Holiday - Billie's Blues (1951)
- Ringo Starr recorded a version in 1970 for his debut solo album Sentimental Journey.

== See also ==
- List of jazz standards
