= Don Tosti =

American musician (1923–2004)

- Born: Edmundo Martínez Tostado; March 27, 1923; El Paso, Texas, U.S.
- Died: August 2, 2004 (aged 81) Palm Springs, California, U.S.
- Genres: jazz, mambo, classical, R&B

Don Tosti (given name: Edmundo Martínez Tostado) (March 27, 1923 – August 2, 2004) was a Mexican American musician and composer. Tosti forged a career spanning several decades and styles, from classical to jazz to rhythm and blues and mambo. He was best remembered for his Pachuco-style compositions like the hit "Pachuco Boogie". Recorded in 1948, it was the first million-selling Latin song.

== Career ==
Tosti's career began in the Boyle Heights neighborhood of Los Angeles with other Mexican-American jazz musicians such as Ray Vasquez and Eddie Cano.

Tosti and his Mexican Jazzmen performed for the famed ninth Cavalcade of Jazz concert held at Wrigley Field in Los Angeles which was produced by Leon Hefflin, Sr. on June 7, 1953. Also featured that day were Roy Brown and his Orchestra, Shorty Rogers, Earl Bostic, Nat "King" Cole, and Louis Armstrong and his All Stars with Velma Middleton.

== Personal life ==
Tosti lived in the Deep Well neighborhood of Palm Springs, California, from 1973 until his death in 2004. In 1996, a Golden Palm Star on the Palm Springs Walk of Stars was dedicated to him.
