= I'm a Ding Dong Daddy from Dumas =

1928 popular song by Phil Baxter

"I'm a Ding Dong Daddy from Dumas" is a song written and sung by Phil Baxter, accompanied by Phil Harris and his orchestra in 1928. It was originally named after the town of Dumas, Texas. The radio station KDDD-FM in Dumas is named after the song, hence the three D's stand for Ding Dong Daddy.

The song is performed by actor Bill Heath in the series finale of the Comedy Central show Nathan for You in an attempt to convince a group of locals that he is authentically from Dumas, Arkansas.

== Other Versions ==
- The Osmond Brothers
- Bob Wills
- Arthur Godfrey
- Louis Armstrong
- Benny Goodman
- George Melly
- Nick Shoulders
- Robert Earl Keen
- Larry Hooper
- Bill Heath (Nathan for You)
