= Mort Herbert =

American jazz bassist and lawyer(1925-1983)

Mort Herbert (June 30, 1925 – June 5, 1983) was an American jazz bassist and lawyer.

== Life ==
Herbert was born Mort Pelovitz on June 30, 1925, in Somerville, New Jersey. Self-taught on bass, Herbert is best-remembered for his stint as a member of Louis Armstrong's All-stars. Herbert served in the military from 1943 to 1946. After his discharge, he attended Rutgers University (1949–1952). Herbert later began his professional musical career. He worked with Marian McPartland, Don Elliott, the Sauter-Finegan Orchestra band, and Sol Yaged from 1955 to 1958, and other swing and mainstream players, often appearing at the Metropole. Herbert toured the world with Armstrong during 1958 to 1961, appearing on a number of records and film sound tracks and mostly functioning as a supporting player. His contributions are thoroughly documented in All of Me: The Complete Discography of Louis Armstrong. After leaving Armstrong and his All–Stars, Mort mostly worked as a lawyer, playing music only on a part-time basis (including with Herb Ellis). He led an album, Night People, for Savoy in 1956.

In 1959, Herbert, a Jew, apparently had difficulty obtaining a visa for Lebanon, to tour there with Armstrong. Joe Glaser, Armstrong's agent denied the story.

In 1979, Herbert defended Lionel Ray Williams for the murder of Sal Mineo. Williams was found guilty and sentenced to 57 years.

== Death ==
Herbert died on June 5, 1983, in Los Angeles, California, at the age of 57 from a heart attack.

== Discography ==
- Night People (1956)
- The Great Summit (2001)
