= Jack Teagarden =

American jazz trombonist and singer (1905–1964)

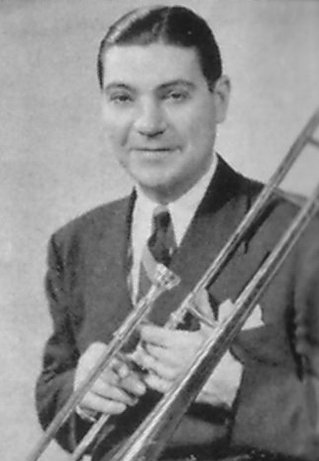
- Teagarden c. 1944

Background information
- Born: Weldon Leo Teagarden; August 20, 1905; Vernon, Texas, U.S.
- Died: January 15, 1964 (aged 58) New Orleans, Louisiana, U.S.
- Genres: Jazz; Dixieland; Swing; Big Band
- Occupation: Musician
- Instruments: Trombone; Vocals
- Years active: 1920–1964
- Formerly of: Cotton Bailey's dance and jazz band; Peck Kelley's ensemble; Ben Pollack band; Paul Whiteman's orchestra; Louis Armstrong's All-Stars
- Website: jackteagarden.com

Weldon Leo "Jack" Teagarden (August 20, 1905 – January 15, 1964) was an American jazz trombonist and singer. He led both of his bands himself and was a sideman for Paul Whiteman's orchestra. From 1946 to 1951, he played in Louis Armstrong's All-Stars.

== Early life ==
Jack Teagarden was born in Vernon, Texas, the oldest of four children. His siblings also pursued musical careers: Charlie played trumpet, Norma played piano, and Clois ("Cub") played drums.

Teagarden's father, Charles, worked in the oil fields and played cornet part-time, while his mother, Helen, was a semi-professional pianist who accompanied silent films in local theaters. Charles encouraged Teagarden to play the baritone horn. At age eight, Jack received his first trombone as a Christmas gift, transitioning from the tenor-valve horn to the trombone. His first public performances were in his local theaters, helping his mother provide music for silent films. After his father's death, the family moved to Chappell, Nebraska where he and his mother continued working in theaters.

Teagarden, who had relatively short arms, avoided a traditional "tailgate" approach in which trombonists played with abundant glissandos. Instead, he compensated with exceptional embouchure control and trumpet-like phrasing, which distinguished him from other players.

Teagarden became the youngest member of the Paul Goetze Band at age 11.

== Music career ==
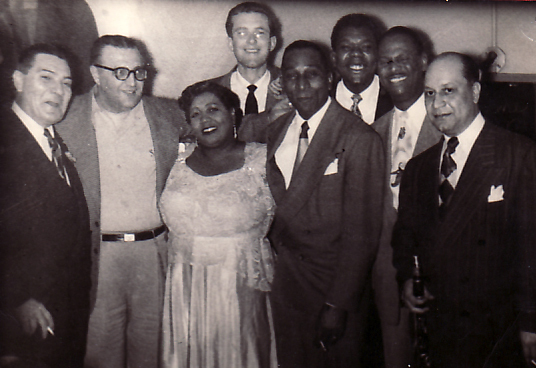
From left: Jack Teagarden, Sandy DeSantis, Velma Middleton, Fraser MacPherson, Cozy Cole, Arvell Shaw, Earl Hines, Barney Bigard, Palomar Supper Club, Vancouver, B.C., Canada (March 17, 1951)

At the age of 16, Teagarden began playing the trombone professionally in San Antonio as a member of Cotton Bailey's dance and jazz band. During his early career, Teagarden played at such venues as the Horn Palace in San Antonio, where he formed a close bond with clarinetist George Hill. After his time with Bailey's band, Teagarden joined Peck Kelley's ensemble, a group that included several of his close collaborators.

Kelley's mentorship and Teagarden's approach to trombone playing helped establish his reputation. The young trombonist's phrasing and improvisational skills made him a sought-after performer, which helped Teagarden to eventually collaborate with players like Louis Armstrong. In the mid-1920s, he traveled widely around the United States in various bands. In 1927, he came to New York City to work with several other bands, and by 1928, he was playing with the Ben Pollack band.

While a member of Pollack's band, Teagarden recorded over 300 tracks. He also participated in one of the first integrated jazz recording sessions in 1929, organized by Eddie Condon, which produced the track "Knocking a Jug". Teagarden's career continued with Paul Whiteman's orchestra, though the band's limited jazz repertoire prompted him to leave after a five-year contract.

In the late 1920s, he recorded with musicians such as Louis Armstrong, Benny Goodman, Bix Beiderbecke, Red Nichols, Jimmy McPartland, Mezz Mezzrow, Glenn Miller, Eddie Condon, and Fats Waller. In 1931, Teagarden's own orchestra recorded the tune "Chances Are" with Fats Waller playing piano and Jack singing and playing trombone. Miller and Teagarden collaborated to provide lyrics to Spencer Williams' "Basin Street Blues", which became one of Teagarden's most frequently played numbers.

During the Great Depression, Teagarden sought financial security and signed an exclusive contract to play for the Paul Whiteman Orchestra from 1933 through 1938. In 1946, Teagarden joined Louis Armstrong's All-Stars.

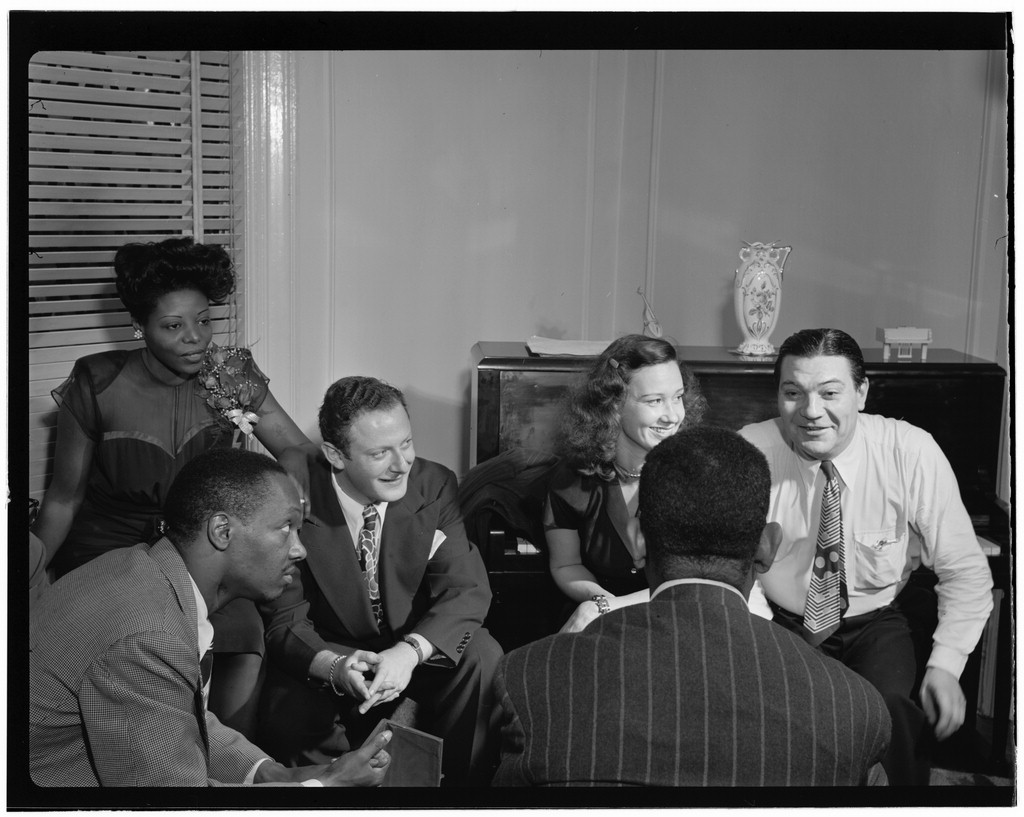
From left to right: Mary Lou Williams, Tadd Dameron, Milt Orent, Dixie Bailey, Dizzy Gillespie, and Jack Teagarden. Mary Lou Williams' apartment, New York, N.Y., ca. Aug. 1947 (LOC) (5475990477)

During his tenure with Louis Armstrong's All-Stars, Teagarden demonstrated versatility as a trombonist and vocalist. His relaxed style was reminiscent of the blues and is prominent in his collaborations with Armstrong, such as their rendition of "Rockin' Chair." In late 1951, Teagarden left to again lead his own band.

== Later life and death ==
Teagarden was found dead in his hotel room in New Orleans on January 15, 1964, just hours before he was scheduled to perform. He was 58 years old and actively touring at the time of his death, which was later attributed to bronchial pneumonia. Teagarden was honored with tributes from musicians and fans.

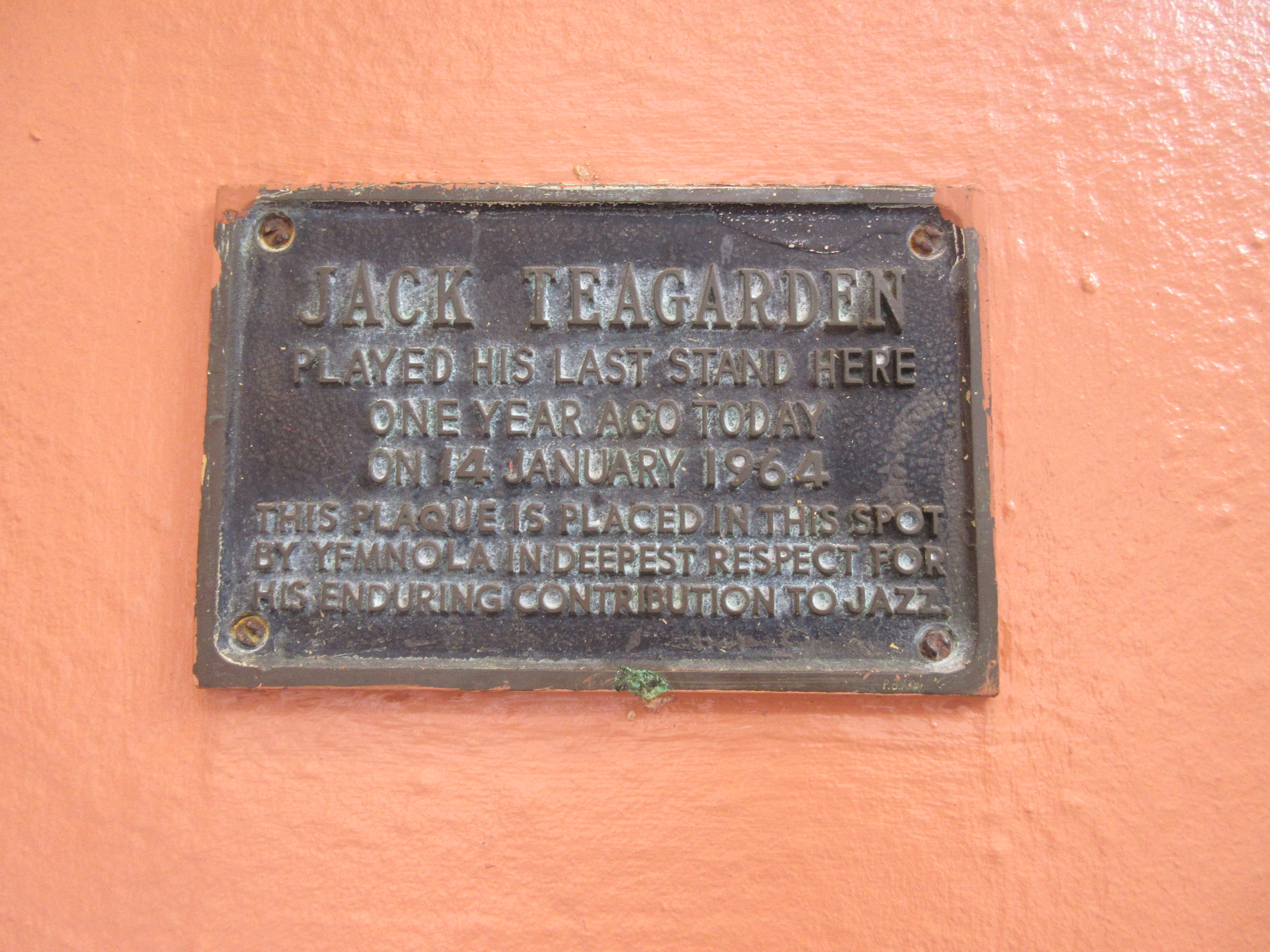
Bourbon Street, French Quarter, New Orleans

The Los Angeles Times noted that Teagarden was celebrated for his innovations in trombone technique and his soulful, blues-inflected vocals.

== Style and technique ==
Largely self-taught, Teagarden developed unusual alternative positions and special effects on the trombone. He is considered an innovative jazz trombone stylist of the pre-bebop era. Pee Wee Russell called him "the best trombone player in the world".

Jack Teagarden's trombone playing did not follow traditional Dixieland style. Instead, he adopted characteristics of his own, including upper register solos, not using a strict solo beat, and lip trills. Growing up in an area with a large Black population, Teagarden developed an appreciation for Black music, especially blues and gospel, and was one of the first jazz musicians to incorporate blue notes into his playing. Critics praised Teagarden for his blues-like smoothness and fluidity, as well as his ability to seamlessly integrate into ensembles when soloing. In addition to playing trombone, Teagarden was also a jazz vocalist.

Jack Teagarden's trombone playing combined smooth, horizontal melodic phrasing with a distinctive use of vertical, arpeggiated lines. His improvisational style, showcased in performances like his 1953 solo on a recording with the Bob Crosby Orchestra of the Rogers and Hart standard Lover, was characterized by a balance of technical skill and melodic fluidity. Critics have highlighted his warm, vocal-like tone throughout his performances.

== Legacy ==
Jack Teagarden performed for diverse audiences, including royal families in Cambodia and Thailand. Despite facing many challenges, including financial struggles during the Great Depression, Teagarden viewed the acceptance of jazz as a cultural achievement.

Jazz historian Gunther Schuller described Teagarden as possessing "effortless sovereign technical mastery, richness of tone, and a total lack of exhibitionism." His influence is evident in the work of later jazz trombonists.

Trombonist Tommy Dorsey reportedly altered his own style to avoid being compared to Teagarden, and Glenn Miller downplayed his trombone skills after working alongside Teagarden in Ben Pollack's band. Gunther Schuller praised Teagarden's ability to combine technical brilliance with emotional depth.

In the years following his passing, the legacy of his recordings and performances remained. The Los Angeles Times highlighted his contributions to the trombone's role within jazz ensembles, and his recordings, including collaborations with Louis Armstrong, are considered to be substantially important to jazz history.

In 1969 Jack Teagarden was inducted into the DownBeat Jazz Hall of Fame and the Big Band and Jazz Hall of Fame in 1985.

== Discography ==
=== As leader ===
- 1930–1934 – Chronological (Classics, 199?)
- 1934–1939 – Chronological (Classics, 199?)
- 1939.06 – Birth of a Band (Giants of Jazz, 1985)
- 1939 – The Metronome All Star Bands (Camden, 1939)
- 1939–1940 – Chronological (Classics, 199?)
- 1928–1940 – King of the Blues Trombone (Epic, 1963) (3xLp) (Ben Pollack, Jack Pettis, Jack Teagarden, Benny Goodman bands)
- 1940 – Big Jazz (Atlantic, 1953) (Jack Teagarden Big Eight only in the 4 tracks of the first side, H.R.S. recordings)
- 1940–1941 – Chronological (Classics, 199?)
- 1941–1943 – Chronological (Classics, 199?)
- 1928–1943 – Father of Jazz Trombone (Avid Entertainment, 2004)[3CD] (Eddie Condon, Bud Freeman, Jack Teagarden bands)
- 1938–1944 – Jack Teagarden and His Swingin' Gates (Commodore, 1944)
- 1944 – The Big Band Sound of Bunny Berigan (1936) & Jack Teagarden (Folkways, 1982) (Jack Teagarden only in the last 6 tracks)
- 1944 – Big Band Jazz (Everest Archive, 1979)
- 1944.08 – Mighty Like a Rose (Koala, 1979)
- 1944.12 – Big T & the Condon Gang (Pumpkin, 1978)
- 1944.08 – Big T Plays the Blues (Ultraphonic, 1940–1944) Reissued with different titles from different labels
- 1944 – Trombone Time (Mercury, 1954) reissued as Holiday in Trombone (EmArcy, 1954) 10" Lp (Jack Teagarden only on side A, band as George Wettling's New Yorkers Keynote original recordings
- 1944–1947 – Chronological (Classics, 199?)
- 1929–1953 – It's Time for T (Naxos, 2006)
- 1954.11 – Jazz Great (Bethlehem, 1956)
- 1954 – Meet the New Jack Teagarden Volume I (Urania, 1954) 10" Lp
- 1954 – Jack Teagarden Plays and Sings (Urania, 1954) 10" Lp
- 1954 – Accent On Trombone (Urania, 1955) contains the previous two 10" Lps. (Reissued with different titled from different labels)
- 1954.11 – Original Dixieland (Everest Archive, 1978) – originally released as Period SPL 1110 (10")
- 1944–1955 – Big T's Jazz (Decca, 1956)
- 1956.01 – This Is Teagarden! (Capitol, 1956)
- 1956.02 – Shades of Night (Capitol, 1959)
- 1956.10 – Swing Low, Sweet Spiritual (Capitol, 1957)
- 1958.04 – Big T's Dixieland Band (Capitol, 1958)
- 1956–1958 – The Complete Capitol Fifties Jack Teagarden Sessions (4xCD) (Mosaic, 1996) Reissue of the 4 previous albums plus two album under the name of Bobby Hackett with indedits
- 1959.07 – Jack Teagarden at the Roundtable (Roulette, 1959)
- 1960.01 – Jazz Maverick (Roulette, 1960)
- 1961.01 – The Dixie Sound of Jack Teagarden (Roulette, 1962)
- 1961.01 – A Portrait of Mr. T (Roulette, 1963)
- 1959–1961 – The Complete Roulette Jack Teagarden Sessions (Mosaic, ?)[4CD] – Reissue of the 4 previous Roulette albums with indedits
- 1961.06 – Mis'ry and the Blues (Verve, 1961)
- 1962.1 – Think Well of Me (Verve, 1962)
- Jack Teagarden (Verve, 1962)
- 1960–63 – The Swingin' Gate (Giants Of Jazz, 1981)
- 1963.03 – Sextet in Person (Fanfare, 1979)
- 1963.09 – 100 Years from Today (Grudge, 1990) Live at Monterey Jazz Festival
- The Blues and Dixie (Rondo–lette, 1963)
- Swinging Down in Dixie (Golden Tone, 1963)

=== As co-leader or guest ===
- 1929 – Eddie Condon's Hot Shots (Label X, Camden, ) Jack Teagarden only in 3 tracks
- The Whoopee Makers (Folkways, 1929)
- 1929 – Louis Armstrong, and his Orchestra (Columbia, 1929) 78 rpm
- 1929–1930 – Louisiana Rhythm Kings – Recorded In New York 1929-1930 (Jazz Oracle, 2002) Jack Teagarden only in 3 tracks
- 1929 – Mound City Blue Blowers (Label X, HMV, 1929)
- 1931 – Charleston Chasers (Columbia, 1931)
- Eddie Lang-Joe Venuti and their all-star Orchestra (Folkways, 1931)
- Benny Goodman and his Orchestra (Columbia, 1933)
- Benny Goodman and his Orchestra (Columbia, 1934)
- 1940 – VV AA, Metronome All Stars (Columbia, 1955) (Jack Teagarden only in two tracks)
- Bud Freemand and His Famous Chicagoans (Harmony, 1940)
- Eddie Condon and His Orchestra (Decca, 1944)
- Louis Armstrong (All Stars), Town Hall Concert (Victor, 1947)
- Eddie Condon and His Orchestra (Decca, 1947)
- 1947 – Louis Armstrong, Satchmo at Symphony Hall (Decca, 1947)
- 1950 – Louis Armstrong, All Stars (Decca, 1950)
- 1950 – Louis Armstrong, Satchmo at Pasadena (Decca, 1951)
- 1952.08 – Ben Pollack and His Pick-A-Rib Boys (Savoy, 1952) (Jack Teagarden only in four tracks)
- 1955 – Bobby Hackett (And His Jazz Band), Coast Concert (Capitol, 1955)
- 1957.09 – Bobby Hackett, Jazz Ultimate (Capitol, 1958)
- Paul Whiteman, Fiftieth Anniversary (Grand Award, 1957)
- 1957 – Bud Freeman, Chicago_Austin High School (RCA Victor, 1957)
- Red Allen, Red Allen, Kid Ory & Jack Teagarden at Newport (Verve, 1957)
- Ben Pollack, Dixieland (Savoy, 1956)

== See also ==
- Red River Valley Museum
