= Velma Middleton =

American jazz vocalist and entertainer (1917–1961)

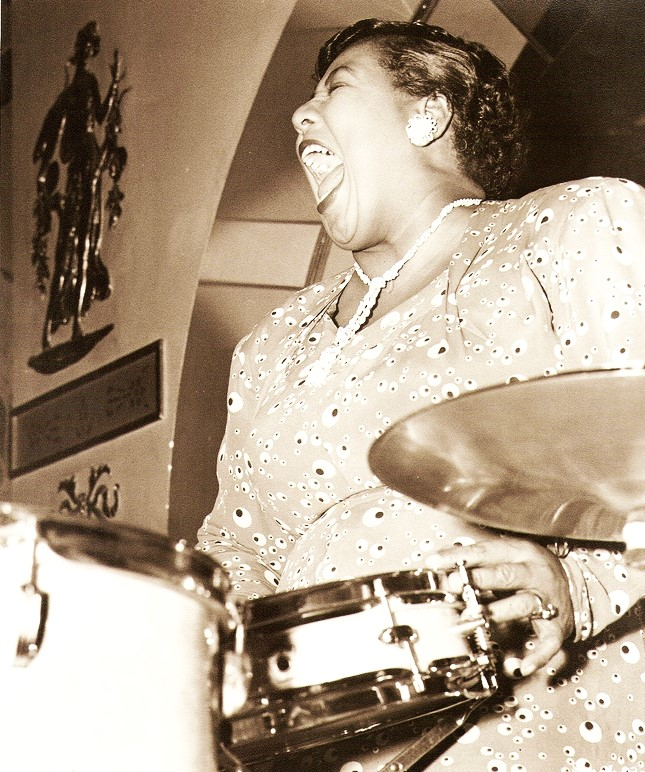
- Photo by Ralph F. Seghers

Background information
- Born: September 1, 1917; Holdenville, Oklahoma, U.S.
- Died: February 10, 1961 (aged 43) Freetown, Sierra Leone
- Genres: Jazz
- Occupation: Singer
- Years active: 1930s–1961
- Formerly of: Louis Armstrong

Velma Middleton (September 1, 1917 – February 10, 1961) was an American jazz vocalist and entertainer who sang with Louis Armstrong's big bands and small groups from 1942 until her death.

== Biography ==
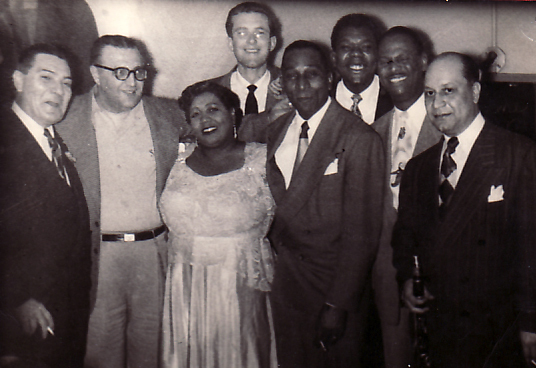
From left: Jack Teagarden, Sandy DeSantis, Velma Middleton, Fraser MacPherson, Cozy Cole, Arvell Shaw, Earl Hines, Barney Bigard at the Palomar Supper Club in Vancouver (March 17, 1951)

Middleton was born in Holdenville, Oklahoma, United States, and moved with her parents to St. Louis, Missouri. She started her career as a chorus girl and dancer and throughout her career performed acrobatic splits on stage. After working as a solo performer, and singing with Connie McLean and his Rhythm Orchestra on a tour of South America, Middleton joined Armstrong's big band in 1942, and appeared with him in soundies.

When Armstrong's orchestra disbanded in 1947, Middleton joined his All-Stars, a smaller group. She was often used for comic relief, such as for duets with Armstrong on "That's My Desire" and "Baby, It's Cold Outside", and she did occasional features. She also recorded eight tracks as a solo singer for Dootone Records in 1948 and 1951. Although she was not widely praised for her voice, described by critic Scott Yanow as "average but reasonably pleasing and good-humored", Armstrong regarded her as an important and integral part of his show.

Middleton performed on June 7, 1953, with Louis Armstrong and his All Stars for the famed ninth Cavalcade of Jazz concert held at Wrigley Field in Los Angeles, which was produced by Leon Hefflin, Sr. Also featured that day were Don Tosti and His Mexican Jazzmen, Roy Brown and his Orchestra, Shorty Rogers, Earl Bostic, and Nat "King" Cole.

While touring with Armstrong in Sierra Leone in January 1961, Middleton suffered a stroke, and died the following month in a hospital in Freetown.

Musician Barney Bigard was critical of Armstrong as well as manager Joe Glaser for refusing, after Middleton took ill, to arrange her transfer to a country with better health facilities.
