= Barney Bigard =

American jazz clarinetist (1906–1980)

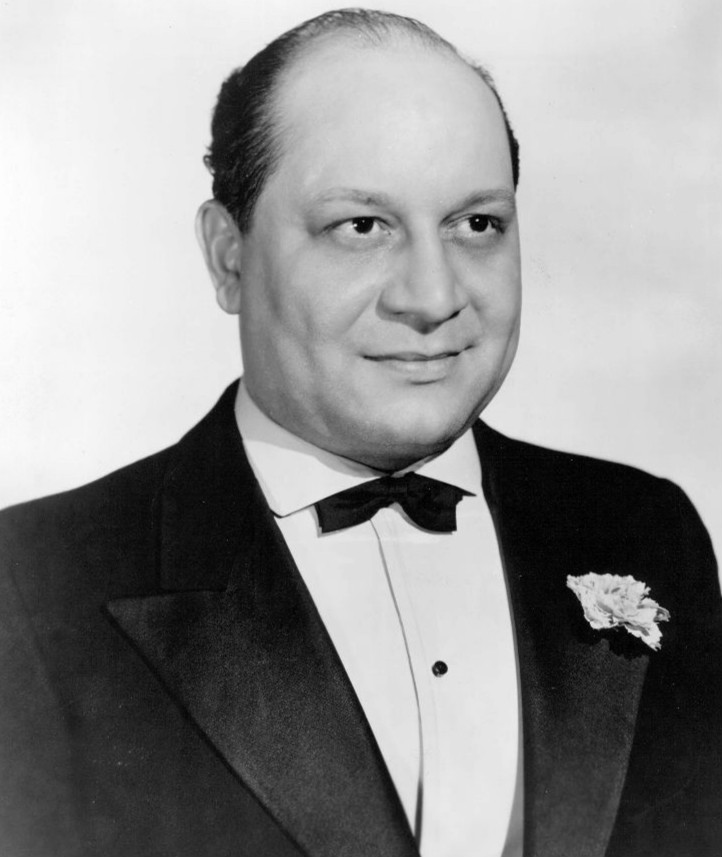
- Bigard in 1947

Background information
- Born: Albany Leon Bigard; March 3, 1906; New Orleans, Louisiana, U.S.
- Died: June 27, 1980 (aged 74) Culver City, California, U.S.
- Genres: Jazz; swing; Dixieland
- Occupations: Musician; bandleader
- Instruments: Clarinet; tenor saxophone
- Years active: 1920s–1980
- Labels: Variety; Vocalion; OKeh; Bluebird; Signature; Rex; Black & White; Keynote; Liberty; French Vogue; Delmark

Albany Leon "Barney" Bigard (March 3, 1906 – June 27, 1980) was an American jazz clarinetist known for his 15-year tenure with Duke Ellington. He also played the tenor saxophone.

== Biography ==
Bigard was born in New Orleans to Creole parents, Alexander and Emanuella Bigard. He had two brothers: Alexander Jr. and Sidney. His uncle, Emile Bigard, was a jazz violinist. He attended local schools and studied music and clarinet with Lorenzo Tio.

In the early 1920s, he moved to Chicago, where he worked with King Oliver and others. During this period, much of his recording, including with clarinetist Johnny Dodds, was on tenor saxophone, which he played often with great lyricism, as on Oliver's "Someday Sweetheart".

In December 1927, Bigard joined Duke Ellington's orchestra in New York. He played with Ellington until 1942. They played primarily at the Cotton Club until 1931, then toured almost nonstop for over a decade. With Ellington, he was the featured clarinet soloist, while also doing section work on tenor saxophone.

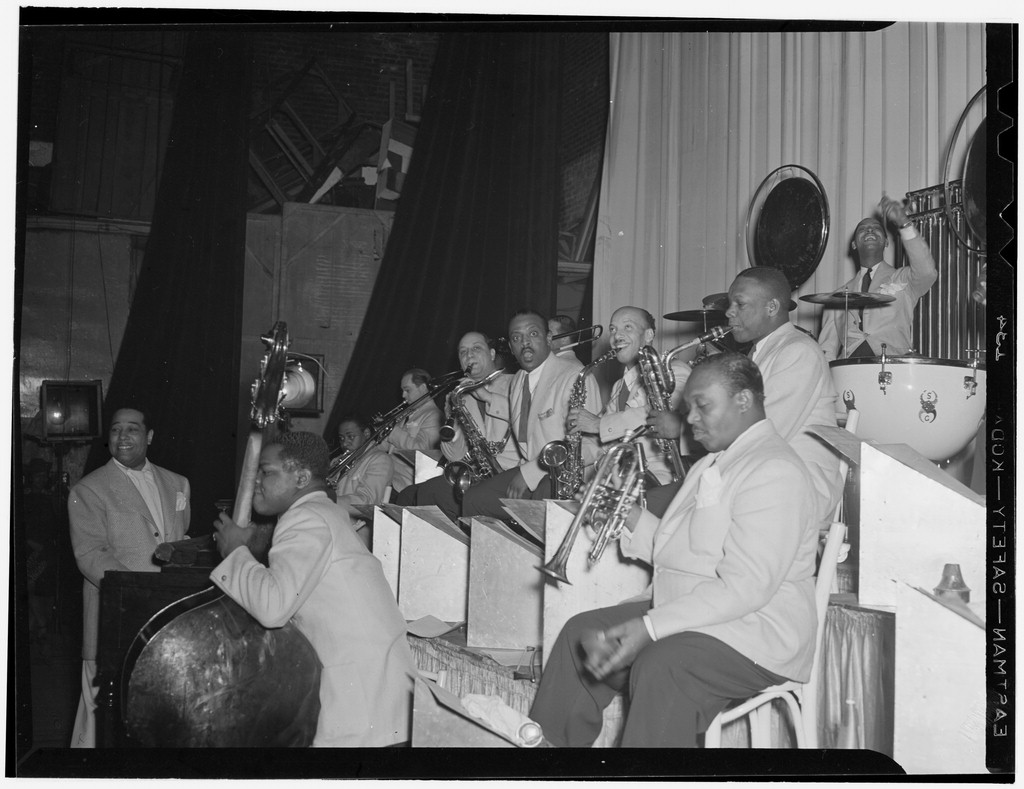
Bigard (center, clarinet) with Duke Ellington's Orchestra, c. 1940s

After leaving Ellington's orchestra, Bigard moved to Los Angeles. He did soundtrack work for Hollywood film studios and had an onscreen featured role with an all-star band led by Louis Armstrong in the film New Orleans (1947). He began working with trombonist Kid Ory's group during the late 1940s. He later worked with Armstrong's touring band, the All Stars, and others.

In 1951, Bigard appeared in The Strip with Armstrong, Jack Teagarden, and Earl "Fatha" Hines (all playing themselves). He again appeared and played in the movie St. Louis Blues (1958), with Nat King Cole, Ella Fitzgerald, Pearl Bailey, and Eartha Kitt.

Bigard wrote an autobiography entitled With Louis and the Duke. He is credited as composer or co-composer on several numbers, including the Ellington standard "Mood Indigo".

== Bigard and His Jazzopaters ==
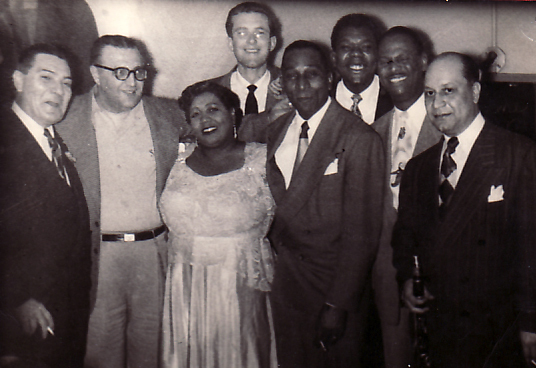
From left: Jack Teagarden, Sandy DeSantis, Velma Middleton, Fraser MacPherson, Cozy Cole, Arvell Shaw, Earl Hines, and Barney Bigard; the Palomar Supper Club, Vancouver, March 17, 1951

The first version of the song "Caravan" (composed by Juan Tizol and later rearranged by Duke Ellington) was recorded in Hollywood, on December 18, 1936, and performed as an instrumental by Barney Bigard and His Jazzopaters. Two takes were recorded and issued, although L-0373-2 is by far the more commonly found take. As of 2024, "Caravan" is the most covered song in history with over 500 versions published.

The band members were Cootie Williams (trumpet), Juan Tizol (trombone), Barney Bigard (clarinet), Harry Carney (baritone saxophone), Duke Ellington (piano), Billy Taylor (bass), and Sonny Greer (drums). All were members of the Duke Ellington Orchestra, which was often drawn upon to record small-group sides. Although Ellington was present at the recording date, the session leader was Bigard.

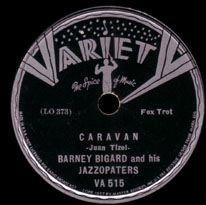
"Caravan" on Variety (VA-515)

In keeping with Ellington's formation of small groups featuring his primary soloists, Bigard continued to be featured under his own name on Variety and subsequently Vocalion Records and OKeh through 1940. When Ellington signed with Victor in 1940, Bigard (and other Ellingtonians) recorded for Bluebird under his own name. He sat in with the Glenn Miller Orchestra for some of their biggest hits, such as "Moonlight Serenade", "Little Brown Jug", and "Tuxedo Junction". Bigard was also a member of Louis Armstrong's All Stars before and after Edmond Hall joined. Bigard can be seen with the All Stars in the movie The Glenn Miller Story (1954).

Bigard performed with Louis Armstrong and his All Stars with Velma Middleton singing vocals for the ninth Cavalcade of Jazz concert held at Wrigley Field in Los Angeles. The concert was produced by Leon Hefflin Sr. on June 7, 1953. Also featured that day were Roy Brown and His Orchestra, Don Tosti and His Mexican Jazzmen, Earl Bostic, Nat "King" Cole, and Shorty Rogers and his Orchestra.

After World War II, Bigard recorded under his own name for, among others, Signature Records, Rex Records, Black & White Records, and Keynote Records in 1944–45. He recorded an album for Liberty in 1957 and an album for French Vogue Records billed as the "Barney Bigard–Claude Luter Quintet" in 1966. In 1968, Delmark Records invited him to Chicago, where he recorded Bucket's Got a Hole in It with Art Hodes.

== Death ==
Bigard died on June 27, 1980, aged 74, in Culver City, California, and was interred there in Holy Cross Cemetery.

== Discography ==
With Art Tatum, Joe Thomas, Georgie Auld, Vic Dickenson, Red Callender, Willie Smith, Zutty Singleton, Johnny Guarnieri, and others

- Barney Bigard 1944–1945 (Classics Records, 1997)

With Art Hodes

- Bucket's Got a Hole in It (Delmark, recorded 1968 in Chicago)

With Benny Carter and Ben Webster

- BBB & Co. (Swingville, 1962)

== Bibliography ==
- With Louis and The Duke (ISBN 978-0-333-40210-8) – Barney Bigard's autobiography
