= Leon Hefflin Sr. =

American jazz vibraphonist, pianist, bandleader and actor (1898–1975)

- Also known as: Hefflin Manufacturing Co.
- Born: August 17, 1898; Palestine, Texas, United States
- Died: November 20, 1975 (aged 77) Los Angeles, California, United States
- Genres: Swing; big band; mainstream jazz; blues
- Occupations: Musical producer; Business owner

Leon Norman Hefflin Sr. (August 17, 1898 – November 20, 1975) was an African-American producer, director, business owner, furniture manufacturer, and entrepreneur. After losing his large and successful manufacturing business in the Depression he rebounded to produce the first and largest outdoor jazz entertainment event of its kind, the "Cavalcade of Jazz," in 1945. Held at Wrigley Field in Los Angeles, it was part of the Central Ave jazz scene, and showcased over 125 artists over 15 years.

== Early life ==
Leon Hefflin was born in 1898 in Palestine, Texas. His father was a blacksmith and his mother was a cook. His family moved to Los Angeles when he was 2, shortly after the murder of their father. He began technical training in grammar school and found he had a gift for woodworking. He excelled above all other students at 14th Street Intermediate School and his handiwork was entered into the State Exposition in 1915.

=== Entrepreneur ===
Hefflin opened Hefflin Manufacturing Company. He moved his furniture factory's site four times. Hefflin developed multiple departments within his factory; dining rooms, living rooms and caskets. Leon was one of the first African-Americans to offer his investors capital stock. Hefflin presented his business plans to the Business League Annual Meeting in Tulsa, Oklahoma (Black Wall Street) in order to expand. He had a factory built and designed by Paul Williams in which he had over 50 employees. Hefflin was listed as one of a few Negro businesses at the time and was valued at $200,000. It was devoted to manufacturing furniture toy making. He eventually lost it at the start of the Depression.

=== Cavalcade of Jazz ===
The Cavalcade of Jazz included performances from Toni Harper, Dinah Washington, Roy Milton, Frankie Lane and others. Leon's last concert was held at the Shrine Auditorium on August 3, 1958. He hosted a beauty contest at the events. His first COJ show starred Count Basie, The Honey Drippers, Valaida Snow, Joe Turner, The Peters Sisters, Slim and Bam and more artists on September 23, 1945. He also produced "Sweet N' Hot" featuring Dorothy Dandridge at the Mayan Theatre downtown Los Angeles. In 1940 he presented the Wings Over Jordan Choir in the Hollywood Bowl. The Shrine Auditorium and the Elks auditorium held many of his events. He built and operated the Royal Appomattox Club and owned a 250-room hotel with cafe.

=== Sweet 'n' Hot ===
Leon rented the Mayan Theater downtown Los Angeles to produce the "Greatest Negro All Star Musical to Hit Coast". His business partner was Curtis Mosby. The featured performer was Dorothy Dandridge. The show had a run of eleven weeks and was going to New York. It closed to rave reviews. and was covered by 20 newspapers across the country.
