= Ella Fitzgerald and Louis Armstrong collaborations =

American musical duo collaboration

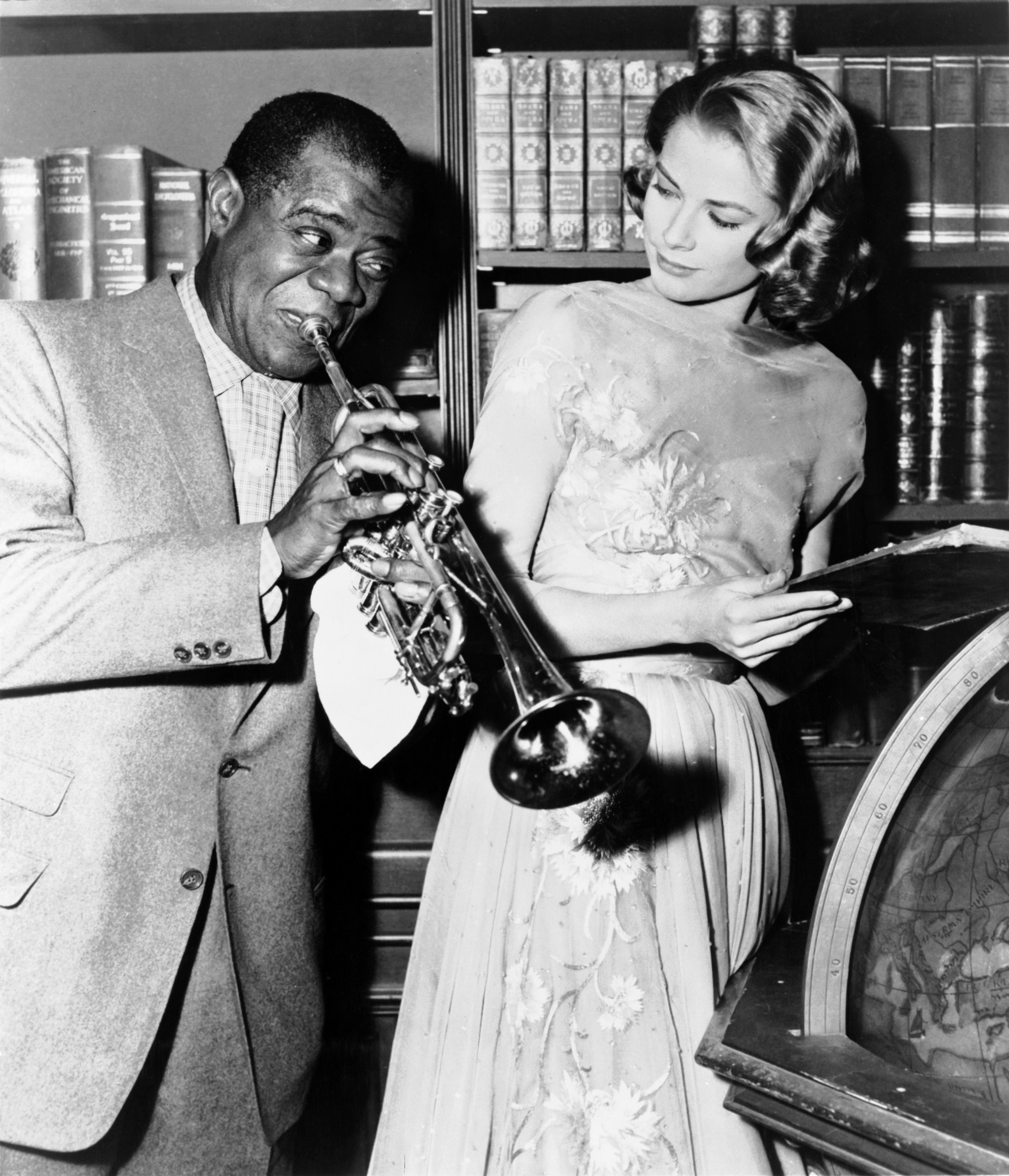
Louis Armstrong mingles with Grace Kelly in 1956, pictured on the set of High Society.

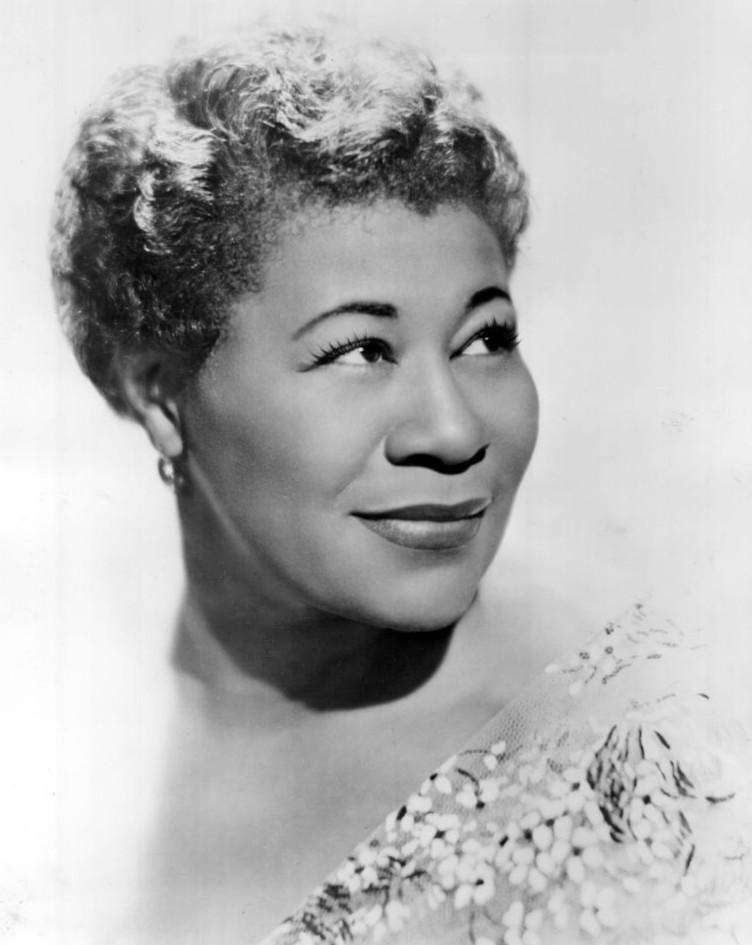
Ella Fitzgerald poses in a 1962 publicity photo.

The collaborations between Ella Fitzgerald and Louis Armstrong have attracted much attention over the years. The artists were both widely known icons not just in the areas of big band, jazz, and swing music but across 20th century popular music in general. The two African-American musicians produced three official releases together in Ella and Louis (1956), Ella and Louis Again (1957), and Porgy and Bess (1959). Each release earned both commercial and critical success. As well, tracks related to those albums have also appeared in various forms in multi-artist collections and other such records.

In terms of touring performances, Fitzgerald once again teamed up with Armstrong, after the success of their first album, to hold a series of concerts at the Hollywood Bowl. The duo's music proved popular with the live audiences. Two live tracks from those 1956 concerts would end up being released as album bonus material in the 1990s.

== Background ==
Ella Fitzgerald (April 25, 1917 – June 15, 1996) was an African-American jazz vocalist often referred to by honorific nicknames such as the "First Lady of Song" and the "Queen of Jazz". "Lady Ella" attracted notoriety for her purity of tone, impeccable diction, lyrical phrasing, and vocal intonation; her instrument-like improvisational ability with her voice, particularly in her scat singing, proved popular with many audiences. In the 1950s, the depth and scope of her many releases had already attracted major attention. Many critics of the time regarded her as one of the best female vocalists still making music.

Louis Armstrong (August 4, 1901 – July 6, 1971) was an African-American jazz singer and trumpeter as well as composer who ended up being one of the most pivotal and influential figures in not just jazz-related styles but across popular music. His career spanned five decades, from the 1920s to the 1960s, and different eras both musically and also in terms of U.S. culture. Coming to prominence first as an inventive player, Armstrong attracted notice for shifting the focus in his records from collective improvisations to turn-by-turn solo performances. Like Fitzgerald, Armstrong picked up popular nicknames, in his case "Pops" and "Satchmo", that stuck, and critics praised him by the 1950s as a sort of elder statesman of popular music.

Fitzgerald appeared in many duets in the Forties, appearing on recordings with, among others, The Ink Spots, Louis Jordan and Louis Armstrong as well as a host of instrumentalists from the Jazz At The Philharmonic troupe. The idea of entire duet album came about from Verve's Norman Granz who had the idea to pair Fitzgerald and Armstrong. Granz also persuaded Armstrong to forsake his own trad jazz group and embrace the modern sound of Oscar Peterson and composers such as Porter and Berlin. Fitzgerald allowed Louis to choose the keys in which to sing the repertoire and together they recorded the first of three albums, Ella and Louis.

== Release details ==
Ella and Louis found Ella Fitzgerald and Louis Armstrong accompanied by the Oscar Peterson Quartet. The studio album came out when both figures were at high points in their careers commercially. The recording sessions getting started in August 1956, the tracks specifically featured Oscar Peterson on piano, Buddy Rich on drums, Herb Ellis on guitar, and Ray Brown on bass. Seminal record producer Norman Granz masterminded the affair. Granz, who founded the record label Verve in 1956, is known as "one of the most powerful non-musicians in jazz" history. Consisting entirely of vocal duets, compositions sung by the artists in the album include the George and Ira Gershwin songs "A Foggy Day" and "They Can't Take That Away from Me" as well as James Warburg with Kay Swift's "Can't We Be Friends?".

Ella and Louis Again, which features nineteen songs, primarily consists as a collection of vocal duets like its predecessor. However, seven selections do involve either Armstrong or Fitzgerald singing without the other. Examples of the popular music standards done in the album include the Irving Berlin compositions "I'm Putting All My Eggs in One Basket" and "I've Got My Love to Keep Me Warm" as well as the Vernon Duke piece "Autumn in New York". The backing group remained the same except for Buddy Rich's role being taken by Louie Bellson;

Porgy and Bess, which came out in April 1959, is not to be confused with either the 1951 release by the same title or the 1956 release The Complete Porgy and Bess (which is also known as just Porgy and Bess too). All three albums draw on the material in George and Ira Gershwin's operatic stage drama of that name, a piece that had its original Broadway production in 1935. All of the above titles are also sometimes known as Porgy & Bess.

On May 20, 1997, the compilation album The Complete Ella Fitzgerald & Louis Armstrong on Verve first came out. The Complete Ella Fitzgerald and Louis Armstrong Studio Recorded Duets (also known as just The Complete Studio Recorded Duets) was first released on March 31, 2008. It saw a re-release in 2011. Despite the latter's title, that two-CD album only featured a selection of thirty-five particular tracks by the duo, lifting just four of the pieces on Porgy and Bess.

== Reviews and reception ==
Ella and Louis has picked up praise from a variety of publications. Writing for AllMusic, critic Scott Yanow stated that the two stars made "for a charming team" and provided "tasteful renditions" of the ballads chosen. The album joined the Grammy Hall of Fame by 2016.

Ella & Louis Again earned similar laudatory comments from many publications. AllMusic's Alex Henderson stated that he could find details to "nitpick", such as a possible lack of trumpet solos despite Armstrong's strong presence, yet found little reason to criticize "this fine set". Henderson also made a note of the "solid rhythm section led by pianist Oscar Peterson".

Porgy and Bess joined the Grammy Hall of Fame by 2001. The Complete Ella Fitzgerald & Louis Armstrong on Verve attracted praise in the same vein as the original releases that the compilation albums took songs from, such as from Richard S. Ginell of Allmusic.

Writing for All About Jazz, music critic David Rickert stated that the collaborations were "a match made in heaven" and lauded Ella and Louis, Ella and Louis Again, and Porgy and Bess all as "terrific albums". He remarked, "Their work together is a highlight of the 1950s, a busy time for classic vocal jazz records, and both were in fine form on these dates, Fitzgerald's sweetly melodic voice contrasting nicely with Armstrong's coarse rasp." In his view, the related 2011 compilation album that included most of their collaborations, while missing several tracks, "captures some of the finest vocal work of the past century".

== See also ==
- Bing Crosby and Louis Armstrong collaborations:
  - Pennies from Heaven (soundtrack)
  - Here Comes the Groom (soundtrack)
  - Bing & Satchmo
- Duke Ellington and Louis Armstrong collaborations:
  - Louis Armstrong and Duke Ellington: The Great Summit/Complete Sessions
- Count Basie and Frank Sinatra collaborations:
  - Sinatra–Basie: An Historic Musical First
  - It Might as Well Be Swing
