= Armstrong Secret 9 =

Information
- League: Independent
- Location: New Orleans, Louisiana
- Established: 1931
- Disbanded: 1931

The Armstrong Secret 9, originally known as the Raggedy 9 and later also as the Smart 9, were a semi-pro Negro league baseball team. The team was sponsored by American jazz musician Louis Armstrong in 1931 in his hometown of New Orleans, Louisiana. In the summer of 1931, they toured with Armstrong and they possibly played in 1932 before news coverage of them disappeared. They wore white uniforms with "Armstrong" displayed in a bold font on the chest of each jersey.

== History ==
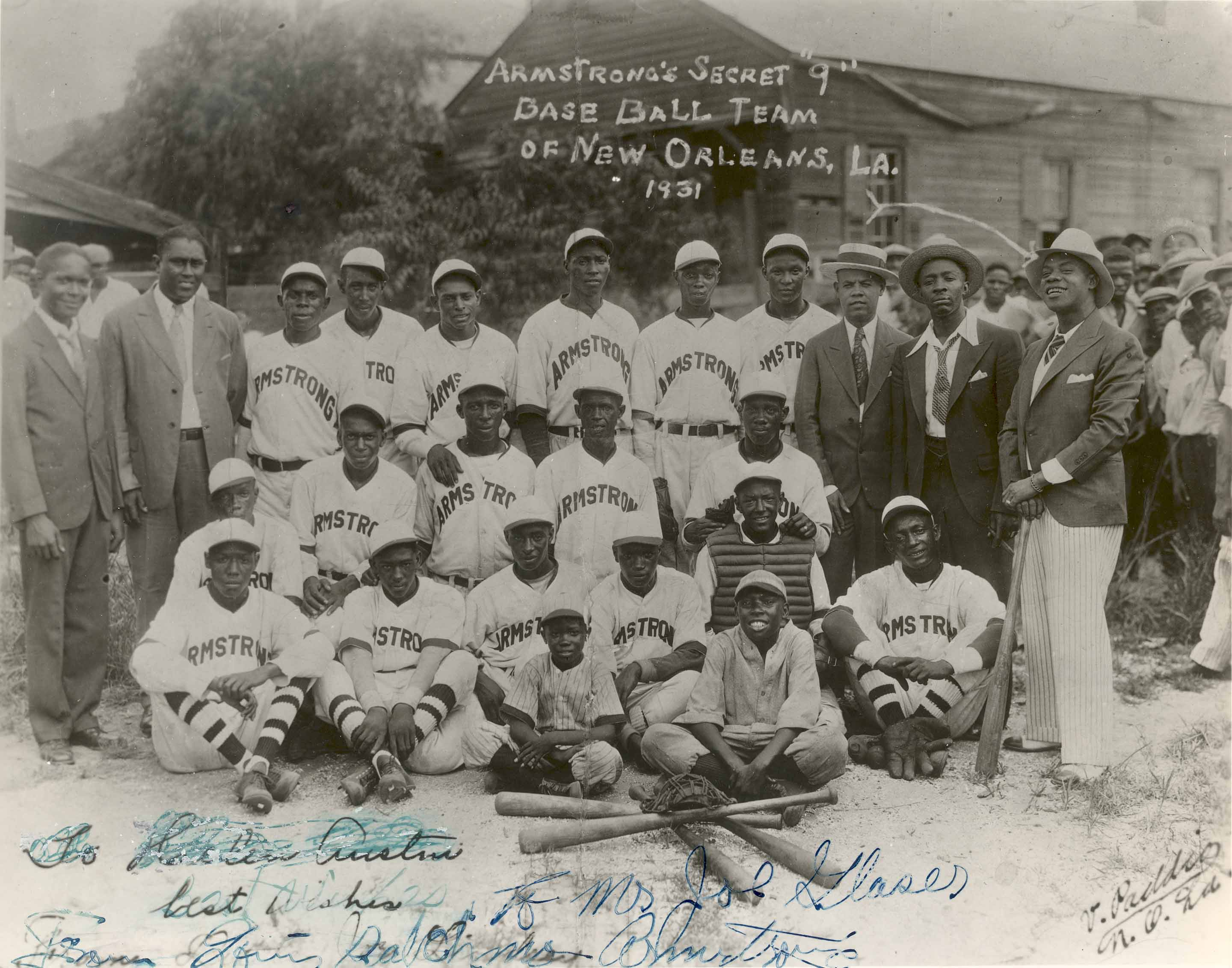
The "Secret 9"; photo by Villard Paddio

During the Jazz Age, the popularity of baseball made for an attractive medium used by American entertainers and public figures for self promotion. Both softball and baseball teams were formed by big name bands led by Benny Goodman, Count Basie, Harry James, Tommy Dorsey, and Louis Armstrong. Unifying teams with bands gave a professional platform for all to evolve and grow in their craft as well as perform on a significantly larger scale in front of bigger audiences. Armstrong, an avid baseball fan and New Orleans native, sponsored a New Orleans–based team called the Raggedy 9. The name was inspired by the poor quality of their uniforms. The ball club competed against other local amateur and semi-pro African American teams during Armstrong's three-month stay in New Orleans. Armstrong had such a great love for the team and their talent that he bought the team new uniforms made with fine cotton and put his name on the front of each uniform, renaming them Armstrong's Secret 9. The team was located in his hometown of New Orleans, Louisiana, and played in the summer of 1931.

=== 1931: The Three-month tour ===
When Louis Armstrong returned home from his professional music tour, he and his Secret 9 went on a three-month homecoming tour in the New Orleans area during which they scrimmaged with other black baseball teams in southern Louisiana. They played against the Melpomene White Sox at St. Raymond Park, where they had 1,500 fans in attendance. This game caused a spike of interest in the African-American community when Louisiana Weekly published an article about the team. Louis Armstrong didn't just sit back and watch the team play as they toured. Peter J. Levinson asked the musician what he played and Armstrong replied with the type of musical instruments he played. James re-asked the question with "No, what position in baseball?" The Secret 9 competed against college and prison teams with Armstrong throwing out the first pitch each game.

=== Members ===
While no rosters are known to exist, the team was allegedly made up of members of the Zulu Social Aid and Pleasure Club.

== Uniforms ==
The Raggedy 9 had tattered uniforms and busted cleats before Louis Armstrong's intervention. Armstrong provided them with brand new white uniforms with engraved stitching and Armstrong's last name on the front and their respective numbers on the back. This gave the men more confidence in their ball skills and a boost of improvement in each area of the game. In August 1931 a reporter for the Louisiana Weekly commented that the team was "outfitted with just about everything a good ball club needs" that included everything "from their baseball caps down to the mascot's water bucket." The players tried to keep their new uniforms in good condition, something that proved detrimental as they did not want to mar them by sliding in the dirt. In the same Louisiana Weekly article it was noted "Yeah, Louis's boys were all spruced up in their 'Sunday Go To Meetings,' but when it came to bucking up against a guy with a luck piece, they couldn't meet the issue. Wonder if they were too well dressed?"
