= Ella and Louis =

Studio album by Ella Fitzgerald and Louis Armstrong
- Released: October 1956
- Recorded: August 16, 1956
- Studios: Capitol Studios, Hollywood
- Genre: Jazz
- Length: 54:06
- Labels: Verve MGV 4003; Polygram 825 373-2 (1989)
- Producer: Norman Granz

Ella Fitzgerald chronology
Ella Fitzgerald Sings the Cole Porter Songbook (1956)	Ella and Louis (1956)	Ella Fitzgerald Sings the Rodgers & Hart Songbook (1956)

Louis Armstrong chronology
The Great Chicago Concert (1956)	Ella and Louis (1956)	I've Got the World on a String (1957)

Ella and Louis is an album by Ella Fitzgerald and Louis Armstrong, accompanied by the Oscar Peterson Quartet, released in October 1956. Having previously collaborated in the late 1940s for the Decca label, this was the first of three albums that Fitzgerald and Armstrong were to record together for Verve Records, later followed by 1957's Ella and Louis Again and 1959's Porgy and Bess.

== The album ==
Norman Granz, the founder of the Verve label, selected eleven ballads for Fitzgerald and Armstrong, mainly played in a slow or moderate tempo. Recording began 16 August 1956, at the new Capitol Studios in Hollywood. Though Granz produced the album, Armstrong was given final say over songs and keys.

The success of Ella and Louis was replicated by Ella and Louis Again and Porgy and Bess. All three were released as The Complete Ella Fitzgerald & Louis Armstrong on Verve. Verve also released the album as one of the first ones in SACD.

== Reception ==
Professional ratings
Review scores
Source	Rating
AllMusic	4.5/5 stars
The Encyclopedia of Popular Music	5/5 stars
The Penguin Guide to Jazz Recordings	3.5/4 stars
The Rolling Stone Jazz Record Guide	4/5 stars

AllMusic's Scott Yanow wrote, "Ella Fitzgerald and Louis Armstrong make for a charming team on this CD… This is primarily a vocal set with the emphasis on tasteful renditions of ballads." Jasen and Jones called the set a "pinnacle of popular singing". The Penguin Guide to Jazz, compiled by Richard Cook and Brian Morton, says that while the approaches of Armstrong and Fitzgerald may not have been entirely compatible, the results are "hard to resist", and awards the album three and a half stars.

In 2000 it was voted number 636 in Colin Larkin's All Time Top 1000 Albums.

Björk chose the album as one of her favourites in a 1993 Q feature. "I love the way Ella and Louis work together," she remarked. "They were opposites in how they sung, but were still completely functional together, and respectful of each other."

== Track listing ==
=== Side one ===
No.	Title	Writer(s)	Length
1.	"Can't We Be Friends?"	Paul James, Kay Swift	3:47
2.	"Isn't This a Lovely Day?"	Irving Berlin	6:16
3.	"Moonlight in Vermont"	John Blackburn, Karl Suessdorf	3:42
4.	"They Can't Take That Away from Me"	Ira Gershwin, George Gershwin	4:39
5.	"Under a Blanket of Blue"	Jerry Livingston, Al J. Neiburg, Marty Symes	4:18
6.	"Tenderly"	Walter Gross, Jack Lawrence	5:10

=== Side two ===
No.	Title	Writer(s)	Length
1.	"A Foggy Day"	Ira Gershwin, George Gershwin	4:32
2.	"Stars Fell on Alabama"	Mitchell Parish, Frank Perkins	3:34
3.	"Cheek to Cheek"	Irving Berlin	5:53
4.	"The Nearness of You"	Hoagy Carmichael, Ned Washington	5:42
5.	"April in Paris"	Vernon Duke, Yip Harburg	6:33

== Personnel ==
- Ella Fitzgerald – vocals
- Louis Armstrong – vocals, trumpet
- Oscar Peterson – piano
- Herb Ellis – guitar
- Ray Brown – bass
- Buddy Rich – drums

=== Additional personnel ===
- Val Valentin – session engineer
- Phil Stern – photography

== Charts ==
2022 chart performance for Ella and Louis
Chart (2022)	Peak position
German Albums (Offizielle Top 100)	66
