= Struttin' (Louis Armstrong album) =

Studio album by Louis Armstrong with Edmond Hall's All Stars
- Released: March 19, 1996
- Recorded: February 8, 1947
- Venue: Carnegie Hall, New York City
- Genre: Jazz, Dixieland, swing
- Label: Drive Archive

Struttin' is an album by Louis Armstrong with Edmond Hall's All Stars, recorded at Carnegie Hall in 1947, but not released until 1996, 25 years after Armstrong's death in 1971.

== Music and importance ==
The music on the album was recorded during a concert at Carnegie Hall on February 8, 1947. The music features trumpeter Louis Armstrong playing with a small group – clarinettist Edmond Hall, trumpeter "Mousie" Randolph, trombonist Henderson Chambers, pianist Ellis Larkins, bassist Johnny Williams, and drummer Jimmy Crawford – thus making it Armstrong's "first major appearance in front of a small group in close to two decades".

"Clearly, it was inspirational for Armstrong at the time: by the end of 1947, he dissolved his big band and formed his own combo, also called the All-Stars, and adapted most of these songs into their repertoire."

== Reception ==
Professional ratings
Review scores
Source	Rating
AllMusic	3/5 stars

The AllMusic reviewer wrote that, "While the sound quality of this disc is unfortunately primitive, the historical import of the performances overshadows the technical problems."

== Track listing ==
No.	Title	Length
1.	"Dippermouth Blues"	2:08
2.	"Mahogany Hall Stomp"	2:48
3.	"Muskrat Ramble"	2:19
4.	"St. Louis Blues"	2:48
5.	"Rockin' Chair"	4:29
6.	"Tiger Rag"	4:28
7.	"Black and Blue"	3:58
8.	"Confessin'"	4:07
9.	"Struttin' With Some Barbeque"	1:43
10.	"Lazy River"	3:17
11.	"You Rascal You"	3:18
12.	"Save It Pretty Mama"	2:49
