= Louis Armstrong filmography =

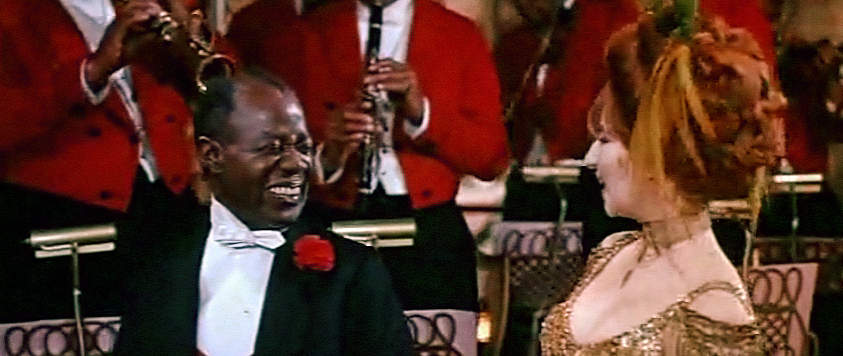
Louis Armstrong and Barbra Streisand in the film Hello, Dolly!

Louis Armstrong appeared in a large number of feature-length films and shorts, often as himself.

- Ex-Flame (1930), as Louis Armstrong
- A Rhapsody in Black and Blue (1932 short), as Louis Armstrong
- I'll Be Glad When You're Dead You Rascal You (1932 short), as Louis Armstrong
- København, Kalundborg og - ? (1934), as Louis Armstrong
- Pennies from Heaven (1936), as Henry
- Artists and Models (1937), as Louis Armstrong
- Every Day's a Holiday (1937), as Louis Armstrong
- Doctor Rhythm (1938), as Trumpet Player
- Going Places (1938), as Gabe
- Birth of the Blues (1941), as Louis Armstrong
- Cabin in the Sky (1943), as The Trumpeter
- Show Business at War (1943 documentary short) (uncredited)
- Jam Session (1944) (uncredited)
- Pillow to Post (1945), as Orchestra Leader
- New Orleans (1947)
- A Song Is Born (1948), as Louis Armstrong
- I'm in the Revue (Italian: Botta e risposta) (1950), as Band Leader
- Saint-Germain-des-Prés (1950), as Louis Armstrong
- The Strip (1951), as Louis Armstrong
- Here Comes the Groom (1951) (uncredited)
- Glory Alley (1952), as Shadow Johnson
- Saluti e baci (1953), as Louis Armstrong
- The Glenn Miller Story (1954), as Louis Armstrong
- High Society (1956), as Louis Armstrong
- The Night Before the Premiere (Die Nacht vor der Premiere) (1959), as Louis Armstrong
- The Five Pennies (1959), as Louis Armstrong
- The Beat Generation (1959), as Louis Armstrong
- La Paloma (1959), as Louis Armstrong
- Kærlighedens melodi (Formula for Love) (1959), as Musician with Orchestra
- Paris Blues (1961), as Wild Man Moore
- Auf Wiedersehen (1961), as Louis Armstrong
- Berlin-Melodie (1963 TV movie)
- When the Boys Meet the Girls (1965), as Louis Armstrong
- Rhein-Melodie - Wein, Gesang und gute Laune (1966 TV movie)
- A Man Called Adam (1966), as Willie Ferguson
- Hello, Dolly! (1969), as Orchestra Leader
- Trumpet Kings (1985)

== See also ==
- Louis Armstrong at IMDb
