= Pierre Tallerie =

American road manager and bus driver for Louis Armstrong

Pierre "Frenchy" Tallerie
- Born: July 22, 1893; New York City, U.S.
- Died: April 11, 1969 (aged 75); New York City, U.S.
- Occupations: Road manager, bus driver, electrician, military policeman
- Known for: Managing tours for Louis Armstrong
- Spouse: Stella (m. 1922) Marianna Canora (m. 1940–1969)
- Children: 1

Pierre "Frenchy" Tallerie (July 22, 1893 – April 11, 1969) was an American road manager, public relations agent, bus driver, electrician, and World War I veteran, best known for his work with jazz musician Louis Armstrong during the 1950s and 1960s. As road manager for "Louis Armstrong and His All-Stars," Tallerie coordinated logistics for domestic and international tours, navigating the racial complexities of the Jim Crow era.

== Early life ==
Pierre Tallerie was born on July 22, 1893, in New York City to French immigrant parents. Nicknamed "Frenchy" for his heritage, he trained as an electrician in his youth, a trade he pursued in New York before entering the military.

== Military service and criminal conviction ==
Tallerie enlisted in the U.S. Army on July 16, 1917, serving as a corporal in the 303rd Military Police Company, 78th Infantry Division, during World War I. Deployed to France in 1918, he performed security duties with the American Expeditionary Forces until July 1919. After demobilization, he was implicated in a 1919 automobile trafficking ring in France, convicted in 1920, and served a two-year sentence. He returned to the U.S. in 1922 under an alias to evade his criminal record. In the mid 1930s, Frenchy testified in a case of Nichola De Marco who was accused of killing 20 people in a bus crash due to defective brakes on July 22, 1934.

== Career with Louis Armstrong ==
In the mid-1940s, Tallerie joined Armstrong’s entourage, through manager Joe Glaser, initially as a bus driver for the All-Stars, formed in 1947. By the early 1950s, he was promoted to road manager, handling tour logistics, bookings, and accommodations. His work supported Armstrong’s global tours, including 1956 Africa and 1965 Eastern Bloc performances, earning Armstrong the moniker "Ambassador Satch."

As a white manager in the Jim Crow South, Tallerie negotiated with segregated venues and authorities, securing lodgings for the integrated All-Stars. However, his abrasive demeanor drew criticism. Armstrong’s friend Jack Bradley described him as unpopular, with suspected ties to Glaser’s Chicago underworld network. In 1955, Tallerie teased Armstrong about admiring Guy Lombardo, prompting a collaborative performance. In 1965 Leipzig, East German media noted his gruff interruption of Armstrong’s fan interactions. Frenchy was a "big man who, with his snow-white hair and several acres of belt buckle, looks like a mountain that has just had an avalanche."

== Little rock crisis (1957) ==
On September 19, 1957, during the Little Rock Nine crisis, Armstrong publicly criticized Arkansas Governor Orval Faubus and President Dwight D. Eisenhower for their handling of school integration, threatening to cancel a Soviet tour. The next day, Tallerie, acting on Glaser’s orders, told the press Armstrong “loves Eisenhower” and was not angry, attempting to retract the statements. Armstrong, furious at this unauthorized intervention, rebuked Tallerie, stating he “doesn’t particularly care about the colored people” and stood by his critique of Eisenhower. Reportedly, Armstrong temporarily fired Tallerie, and a 1957 tape box with Tallerie’s photo was symbolically covered by Armstrong. The incident, covered in national media, underscored Armstrong’s civil rights stance and Tallerie’s misalignment, as noted by historian Gary Giddins.

== Personal life ==
Tallerie married Stella in 1922, with the marriage's outcome unclear. In the 1940s, he married Marianna Canora (1910–1998), and they had a son, Pierre, in 1947. Residing in Queens, New York, Tallerie shared tour stories with his family, as recalled by granddaughter Kerryann. He died on April 11, 1969, aged 75.

== Legacy ==
Tallerie’s logistical support was crucial for Armstrong’s All-Stars, enabling tours in the Jim Crow era and globally, but his legacy is overshadowed by controversy. Jazz historian Ricky Riccardi described him as “infamous” for his racial insensitivity, a view echoed by Armstrong, who noted Tallerie’s lack of musical knowledge. Edward Berger highlights road managers’ under-documented role in jazz, with Tallerie exemplifying the pragmatic, often fraught dynamics of the industry. His life, spanning military service, a criminal conviction, and music management, reflects the complex backstage of jazz history.
