= Peter Levinson =

American music writer (1934–2008)

- Born: Peter James Levinson; July 1, 1934; Atlantic City, New Jersey
- Died: October 21, 2008 (aged 74); Malibu, California
- Education: University of Virginia
- Occupations: Publicist, Biographer

Peter James Levinson (1 July 1934 Atlantic City, New Jersey - 21 October 2008 Malibu) was an American music publicist and biographer, particularly of jazz musicians.

== Education ==
Levinson took his bachelor's at the University of Virginia, where he wrote on jazz in the university paper.

== Career ==
After completing service in the Army in Korea, he wrote freelance on jazz music in New York City and took a job at Columbia Records in the late 1950s. His first job as a publicist was with Jack Jones, beginning in 1962. He spent nearly fifty years in the music industry as a promoter and representative for stars such as Count Basie, Artie Shaw, Woody Herman, Lalo Schifrin, Antonio Carlos Jobim, Chuck Mangione, Dave Brubeck, Rosemary Clooney, Erroll Garner, Stan Getz, Peggy Lee, Bill Evans, Dexter Gordon, Maynard Ferguson, Pete Fountain, Art Garfunkel, Bud Shank, Phyllis Diller, George Shearing, Chick Corea, Jim Hall, Benny Carter, Charlie Byrd, Louie Bellson, Dee Dee Bridgewater, Jack Lemmon, and Mel Tormé.

Levinson's publicity work also extended into television and film, working on Dallas, Z, Fiddler on the Roof, and Kramer vs. Kramer. He founded his own company, Peter Levinson Communications, which was based initially in New York; though he reduced his clientele in the 1980s and 1990s, he continued to represent clients into the early 2000s. He also helped orchestrate the 1986 introduction of a postage stamp in honor of Duke Ellington.

Late in his career, Levinson began writing biographies, completing works on Harry James, Nelson Riddle, and Tommy Dorsey. A biography of Fred Astaire was completed just before his death, and was published in 2009: Puttin' on the Ritz: Fred Astaire and the Fine Art of Panache, St. Martin's Press OCLC 243544712; ISBN 9780312353667; ISBN 0312353669.

== Later life and death ==
Levinson contracted amyotrophic lateral sclerosis in 2006, which prevented him from speaking; he used a type-to-speech computer and continued writing. He died at the age of 74 after a fall at his home in Malibu, California on October 21, 2008.

== Bibliography ==
- Trumpet Blues: The Life of Harry James (1999)
- September in the Rain: The Life of Nelson Riddle (2001)
- Tommy Dorsey: Livin' in a Great Big Way (2005)
- Puttin' on the Ritz: The Life of Fred Astaire (2009)
