= Porgy and Bess (Ella Fitzgerald and Louis Armstrong album) =

Studio album by Ella Fitzgerald, Louis Armstrong
- Released: April 1959
- Recorded: August 18–19 and October 14, 1957 in Los Angeles
- Genre: Jazz, light opera, swing
- Length: 66:04
- Label: Verve MGV 4011-2; Verve MGVS 6040-2; Verve 827 475-2 (1990)
- Producer: Norman Granz

Ella Fitzgerald chronology
Ella Fitzgerald Sings the Irving Berlin Song Book (1958)	Porgy and Bess (1959)	Hello, Love (1959)

Louis Armstrong chronology
I've Got the World on a String (1957)	Porgy and Bess (1959)	Satchmo In Style (1959)

Professional ratings
Review scores
Source	Rating
AllMusic	4.5/5 stars
The Rolling Stone Jazz Record Guide	3/5 stars
Encyclopedia of Popular Music	4/5 stars
The Penguin Guide to Jazz Recordings	3.5/4 stars

Porgy and Bess is a studio album by jazz vocalist and trumpeter Louis Armstrong and singer Ella Fitzgerald, released on Verve Records in 1959. The third and final of the pair's albums for the label, it is a suite of selections from the George Gershwin opera Porgy and Bess. Orchestral arrangements are by Russell Garcia, who had previously arranged the 1956 jazz vocal recording The Complete Porgy and Bess.

== Background ==
In 1959, a big-budget film version produced by Samuel Goldwyn and directed by Otto Preminger arrived in theaters. To coincide with the film, many jazz and vocal versions of the work were produced on records, this one and the celebrated Miles Davis and Gil Evans collaboration among them. The double album was released in both mono and stereo, and on compact disc in 1990. It is also part of the set The Complete Ella Fitzgerald & Louis Armstrong on Verve issued in 1997. Given the nature of the work, only five tracks feature vocals by both Armstrong and Fitzgerald. The mosaic on the cover art was by Joseph Young.

== Reception ==
In 2001, it was awarded a Grammy Hall of Fame Award, a special achievement prize established in 1973 to honor recordings that are at least 25 years old, and that have "qualitative or historical significance." The album is considered the most musically successful amongst the jazz vocal versions of the opera.

The AllMusic review of the album claimed "What's really great about the Ella and Louis version is Ella, who handles each aria with disarming delicacy, clarion intensity, or usually a blend of both... Pops sounds like he really savored each duet, and his trumpet work – not a whole lot of it, because this is not a trumpeter's opera – is characteristically good as gold. This marvelous album stands quite well on its own, but will sound best when matched with the Ray Charles/Cleo Laine version, especially the songs of the Crab Man, of Peter the Honey Man, and his wife, Lily the Strawberry Woman."

== Track listing ==
All music written by George Gershwin; all lyrics by Ira Gershwin and DuBose Heyward except where noted.

=== Side one ===
No.	Title	Writer(s)	Length
1.	"Overture" (instrumental)		10:52
2.	"Summertime"	DuBose Heyward	4:58
3.	"I Wants to Stay Here" (Fitzgerald solo vocal)		4:38

=== Side two ===
No.	Title	Writer(s)	Length
1.	"My Man's Gone Now" (Fitzgerald solo vocal)	DuBose Heyward	4:02
2.	"I Got Plenty O' Nuttin'"		3:52
3.	"Buzzard Song" (Fitzgerald solo vocal)	DuBose Heyward	2:58
4.	"Bess, You Is My Woman Now"		5:28

=== Side three ===
No.	Title	Writer(s)	Length
1.	"It Ain't Necessarily So"	Ira Gershwin	6:34
2.	"What You Want Wid Bess?" (Fitzgerald solo vocal)	DuBose Heyward	1:59
3.	"A Woman Is a Sometime Thing" (Armstrong solo vocal)	DuBose Heyward	4:47
4.	"Oh, Doctor Jesus" (Fitzgerald solo vocal)		2:00

=== Side four ===
No.	Title	Writer(s)	Length
1.	"Here Come de Honey Man / Crab Man / Oh, Dey's So Fresh and Fine"	DuBose Heyward	3:29
2.	"There's a Boat Dat's Leavin Soon for New York" (Armstrong solo vocal)	Ira Gershwin	4:54
3.	"Bess, Oh Where's My Bess?" (Armstrong solo vocal)	Ira Gershwin	2:36
4.	"Oh Lawd, I'm on My Way!" (Armstrong solo vocal with chorus)	DuBose Heyward	2:57

== Personnel ==
- Ella Fitzgerald — vocals
- Louis Armstrong — vocals; trumpet on "Summertime," "I Got Plenty o' Nuttin'," "It Ain't Necessarily So," "A Woman Is a Sometime Thing," and "There's a Boat Dat's Leavin' Soon for New York"

=== Orchestra ===
- Russell Garcia – arranger, conductor
- Victor Arno, Robert Barene, Jacques Gasselin, Joseph Livoti, Dan Lube, Amerigo Marino, Erno Neufeld, Marshall Sosson, Robert Sushel, Gerald Vinci, Tibor Zelig — violins
- Myron Bacon, Abraham Hochstein, Raymond Menhennick, Myron Sandler — violas
- Justin Di Tullio, Kurt Reher, William Van Den Burg — cellos
- Frank Beach, Buddy Childers, Cappy Lewis — trumpets
- Milt Bernhart, Marshall Cram, James Henderson, Lloyd Ulyate — trombones
- Vincent DeRosa – French horn
- Bill Miller, Paul Smith – piano
- Tony Rizzi – guitar
- Joe Mondragon – double bass
- Alvin Stoller – drums
