= Perdition =

Perdition may refer to:

- Hell in Christianity

== Music ==
- Perdition City, an album by Norwegian band Ulver
- The Perdition EP, an album by Norwegian band Enslavement of Beauty
- "Perdition", a song from the album In Consequence by Greek progressive rock band Phase
- "Perdition", a song from the nu metalcore album Villain by American band Attila

== Other uses ==
- Perdition (play), by Jim Allen
- Perdition Peak, a summit in Washington state, US

== See also ==
- Son of perdition, a phrase associated with a demoniacal title in the New Testament
- The Axis of Perdition, a British group
- Road to Perdition (comics), a series of fictional works by Max Allan Collins
  - Road to Perdition, a film based on the graphic novel
    - Road to Perdition (soundtrack), music from the film
- "Ghost of Perdition", from the album Ghost Reveries by Swedish progressive metal band Opeth
- "Throes of Perdition", from the progressive metalcore/thrash metal album Shogun by American band Trivium
- "Postcards from Perdition", bonus track from (some editions of) the album Brief Nocturnes and Dreamless Sleep by American progressive rock band Spock's Beard
