= Road to Perdition (disambiguation) =

Road to Perdition is a 2002 American crime film directed by Sam Mendes.

"Road to Perdition" may also refer to:

- Road to Perdition (comics), a 1998 graphic novel on which the film is based
- Road to Perdition (soundtrack), a 2002 soundtrack album for the film
  - "Road to Perdition", a song on the 2002 soundtrack album
- "Road to Perdition", a song by Jay Electronica on Act II: The Patents of Nobility (The Turn) (recorded circa 2011, released as a single in 2015 and on the album in 2020)
