= Richard Spikes =

American inventor (1878–1963)

- Born: October 2, 1878; San Francisco, California
- Died: January 22, 1963 (aged 84); Los Angeles, California
- Occupations: barber, schoolteacher, musician, businessman, inventor, saloon keeper
- Spouse: Lula Belle Charlton
- Children: 1
- Parent(s): Monroe Spikes Sr., Medora Kirby Spikes

Richard Bowie Spikes (October 2, 1878 – January 22, 1963) was an African-American inventor who held several United States patents. He is credited with developing and improving inventions such as a beer tap, a modification of an automatic gear shift mechanism for motor vehicles, and a safety braking system for trucks and buses. Notably, his beer tap patent was purchased by the Milwaukee Brewing Company, and variations of his design are still in use today. However, many of his other inventions were not widely adopted during his lifetime.

== Life ==
Richard B. Spikes was born in San Francisco, California and the fifth of nine children of Monroe Spikes, a barber, and his wife Medora (Kirby) Spikes. Two of his younger brothers, John Curry Spikes (1881–1955) and Reb Spikes (1888–1982), were musicians and songwriters (Someday Sweetheart, a jazz standard [1919] was their biggest hit). Reb Spikes was a noted jazz saxophonist who worked with Jelly Roll Morton, Kid Ory and Sid Le Protti; among the well known jazzmen he gave a start to were Lionel Hampton and Les Hite.

Although a capable musician—piano and violin—Richard Spikes learned to cut hair in his father's barber shop, and then became a public school teacher in Beaumont, Texas. On October 8, 1900, he married Lula Belle Charlton (1880–1970), daughter of Charles Napoleon Charlton, an ex-slave who co-founded the first public schools for African Americans in the city of Beaumont. Richard and Lula had one son, Richard Don Quixote Spikes (1902–1989).

Soon after his marriage, the elder Spikes moved west to Albuquerque, New Mexico and later Bisbee, Arizona where he operated a barber shop and later a saloon. He became dissatisfied with how draft beer was dispensed from a keg; and developed variations on the pressure-dispense beer tap. The patent was purchased by the Milwaukee Brewing Company and variations of the invention are still in use.

Moving to San Francisco, California, Richard Spikes eventually received a patent pertaining to automobile directional signals, which he installed on a Pierce-Arrow car in 1913. However, contrary to many sources, Spikes was not the original inventor of this pivotal device, as Percy Douglas-Hamilton was awarded U.S. patent 912,831 in 1906 for his creation of the first directional signals, six years before Spikes developed his version of the device. While he was working on his brake testing machine a few years later, the Oakland, California Police Department was interested enough to give it a tryout.

Spikes continued working as a barber, owning and operating shops in San Francisco, Fresno, California and Stockton, California until his eyesight began to fade due to the effects of glaucoma which affected other members of his family, including his brother John, who received a patent for a "writing aid for the blind"—a paper holder, essentially a pad with a clip affixed to it in order to secure sheets of writing paper. Richard Spikes also kept working; in December 1932, Spikes received a patent for modifications to the automatic gear shift device based on automatic transmission for automobiles and other motor vehicles invented in 1904 by the Sturtevant brothers of Boston, Massachusetts.

== Inventions ==
Richard Spikes patented or developed the following inventions:

- U.S. patent 928,813, Beer Tapper (1908)
- U.S. patent 972,277, Billiard Cue Rack (1910)
- U.S. patent 1,362,197, U.S. patent 1,362,198 Continuous contact trolley pole (1919)
- U.S. patent 1,441,383 Brake Testing Machine (1923)
- U.S. patent 1,461,988 Pantograph (1923)
- U.S. patent 1,590,557 Combination Milk Bottle Opener and Cover (1926)
- U.S. patent 1,828,753 Methods and Apparatus of Obtaining Average Samples and Temperature of Tank Liquids (1932)
- U.S. patent 1,889,814 Modifications to the automatic gear shift (1932)
- U.S. patent 1,936,996 Transmission and shifting thereof (1933)
- U.S. patent 2,517,936 Horizontally Swinging Barber's Chair (1950)
- U.S. patent 3,015,522 Automatic Safety Brake System (1962)
