= List of pre-1920 jazz standards =

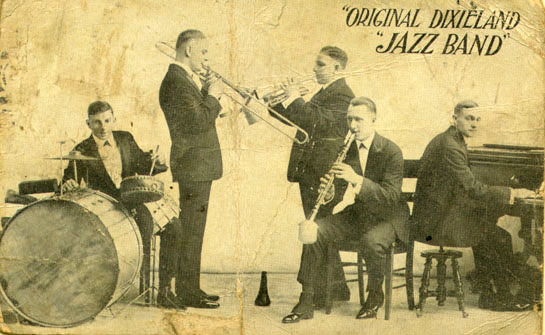
The earliest jazz recordings were made by the Original Dixieland Jass Band in 1917. Their composition "Tiger Rag" has become a popular jazz standard.

Jazz standards are musical compositions that are widely known, performed and recorded by jazz artists as part of the genre's musical repertoire. This list includes compositions written before 1920 that are considered standards by at least one major fake book publication or reference work. Some of the tunes listed were instant hits and quickly became well-known standards, while others were popularized later. The time of the most influential recordings of a song, where appropriate, is indicated on the list.

From its conception at the change of the twentieth century, jazz was music intended for dancing. This influenced the choice of material played by early jazz groups: King Oliver's Creole Jazz Band, New Orleans Rhythm Kings and others included many Tin Pan Alley popular songs in their repertoire, and record companies often used their power to dictate which songs were to be recorded by their artists. Certain songs were pushed by recording executives and therefore quickly achieved standard status; this started with the first jazz recordings in 1917, when the Original Dixieland Jass Band recorded "Darktown Strutters' Ball" and "Indiana". Originally simply called "jazz", the music of early jazz bands is today often referred to as "Dixieland" or "New Orleans jazz", to distinguish it from more recent subgenres.

The origins of jazz are in the musical traditions of early twentieth-century New Orleans, including brass band music, the blues, ragtime and spirituals, and some of the most popular early standards come from these influences. Ragtime songs "Twelfth Street Rag" and "Tiger Rag" have become popular numbers for jazz artists, as have blues tunes "St. Louis Blues" and "St. James Infirmary". Tin Pan Alley songwriters contributed several songs to the jazz standard repertoire, including "Indiana" and "After You've Gone". Others, such as "Some of These Days" and "Darktown Strutters' Ball", were introduced by vaudeville performers. The most often recorded standards of this period are W. C. Handy's "St. Louis Blues", Turner Layton and Henry Creamer's "After You've Gone" and James Hanley and Ballard MacDonald's "Indiana".

== Traditional (author unknown) ==
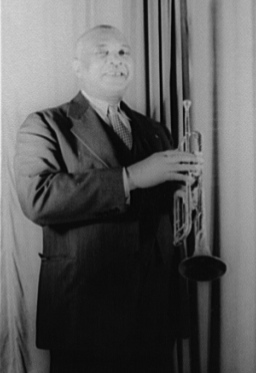
Songwriter and bandleader W. C. Handy was the first to transcribe and publish blues songs. His compositions "The Memphis Blues" (1912), "St. Louis Blues" (1914) and "Beale Street Blues" (1916) have become popular jazz standards.

- "Careless Love". Traditional song of unknown origin, copyrighted by W. C. Handy in 1921. Handy published his version with modified lyrics titled "Loveless Love".
- "St. James Infirmary Blues" is an American blues song and jazz standard of uncertain origin. Louis Armstrong made the song famous in his 1928 recording on which Don Redman was credited as composer; later releases gave the name Joe Primrose, a pseudonym of Irving Mills. Other jazz-oriented versions include a 1941 recording by Artie Shaw and His Orchestra, with Hot Lips Page providing vocals.
- "When the Saints Go Marching In". Traditional gospel hymn possibly originating in nineteenth-century New Orleans as a funeral march. The song was popularized in 1938 by Louis Armstrong, who recorded it more than 40 times during his career. The song is often called "The Saints". It is requested notoriously often in performances of Dixieland bands, and sometimes requests for it even have a higher price than normal requests.

== 1900–1909 ==
- 1901 – "High Society". Composition by Porter Steele. Originally written as a march and published as a rag, the song soon became one of the most popular tunes of the early New Orleans jazz repertoire. A counterpoint to the melody was arranged by Robert Recker for the piccolo in 1901 and made famous by clarinetist Alphonse Picou. The complex countermelody was often used in auditions for brass band clarinet players. King Oliver's Jazz Band popularized the tune in 1923, and other influential recordings were made by Abe Lyman and His Orchestra in 1932 and by Jelly Roll Morton's New Orleans Jazzmen in 1939.
- 1902 – "Bill Bailey". Ragtime song written by Hughie Cannon. It continued the story of an earlier coon song, "Ain't Dat a Shame" by Walter Wilson and John Queen. The song was introduced by Queen in vaudeville and first recorded by Arthur Collins in 1902. Its popularity inspired a host of "Bill Bailey" songs, including Cannon's own "He Done Me Wrong", which used a variation of the melody from "Frankie and Johnny". Originally titled "Bill Bailey, Won't You Please Come Home?", the song is also known as "Won't You Come Home Bill Bailey".

== 1910–1914 ==
Victor Military Band: The Memphis Blues
W. C. Handy's "The Memphis Blues". Recorded by Victor Military Band, July 15, 1914.

- 1910 – "Chinatown, My Chinatown". Popular song with Chinese influences, composed by Jean Schwartz with lyrics by William Jerome. The song was included in the 1910 musical revue Up and Down Broadway and became popular among vaudeville performers in the 1910s. Many Chinese American performers sang the song in both English and Cantonese. Hit recordings were made by the American Quartet in 1915 and by Louis Armstrong in 1932. An easy listening arrangement of the song was also recorded by the John Serry Sextette for RCA Thesaurus in 1954.
- 1910 – "Some of These Days". Popular song by Shelton Brooks. It was popularized by vaudeville performer Sophie Tucker, who used it as her theme song. Tucker recorded the song six times, and sang it in the films Broadway Melody of 1938 (1937) and Follow the Boys (1944). Brooks's distinctively modern composition was not derived from any of the popular song elements of the time, and the song is considered one of the earliest American pop standards.
- 1911 – "Alexander's Ragtime Band". Popular song by Irving Berlin. Introduced by vaudeville performer Emma Carus in Chicago, it was Berlin's first international hit and the biggest Tin Pan Alley hit of the time. Although the music contained few ragtime elements, it started a ragtime craze and introduced the vernacular as a valid form of expression in song lyrics. The melody was allegedly copied from a Scott Joplin composition.
- 1912 – "The Memphis Blues". Blues composition by W. C. Handy with lyrics by George A. Norton. It is one of the earliest printed blues compositions, and two of its three sections are in the twelve-bar blues form. The song possibly originated from a campaign tune for Memphis politician Edward Crump titled "Mr. Crump". Handy claimed composer credit for "Mr. Crump", but some Memphis musicians claimed it was actually written by Handy's clarinetist, Paul Wyer.
- 1913 – "Ballin' the Jack". Popular song composed by Chris Smith with lyrics by Jim Burris. It was introduced in the Harlem play The Darktown Follies and included in Jerome Kern's 1914 musical The Girl from Utah. It was first recorded by Prince's Band on July 31, 1914. The song introduced a dance of the same name, which can be seen in the 1942 film For Me and My Gal with Judy Garland and Gene Kelly. The dance was later blended with the Lindy Hop.
- 1914 – "St. Louis Blues". Blues composition by W. C. Handy. It is the most widely performed blues song and the most popular jazz standard written before the 1920s. It was the most recorded jazz standard for over 20 years. The song was initially only moderately successful, but later became a big hit when vaudeville and revue performers started singing it in their shows. The Original Dixieland Jazz Band recorded the first jazz version in 1921; other notable jazz recordings include Louis Armstrong with blues singer Bessie Smith in 1925 and virtuoso pianist Art Tatum in 1933. The composition combines the traditional twelve-bar blues form with sections in tango rhythm, and its success earned Handy the title "Father of the Blues". Called the "jazzman's Hamlet", it has inspired the Foxtrot dance step and the name of the St. Louis hockey team.
- 1914 – "That's a Plenty". Song composed by Lew Pollack with lyrics by Ray Gilbert. It started out as a rag, and is now included in Dixieland jazz repertoire. The first recording was in 1917 by Prince's Band, and the New Orleans Rhythm Kings recorded their rendition in 1923. An early easy listening arrangement was also recorded by Tony Mottola and John Serry with Biviano Accordion and Rhythm Sextette in 1947. Television comedian Jackie Gleason used it in his shows in the 1950s.
- 1914 – "Twelfth Street Rag". Ragtime composition by Euday L. Bowman. There are three versions of the lyrics, written by Jack S. Sumner in 1916, Spencer Williams in 1929 and Andy Razaf in 1942. The earliest jazz recording is from 1927 by Louis Armstrong and His Hot Seven. Lester Young played an influential solo on Count Basie Orchestra's 1939 recording. Pee Wee Hunt's 1948 recording sold over three million copies, making the tune the best-selling rag in history.

== 1915–1917 ==
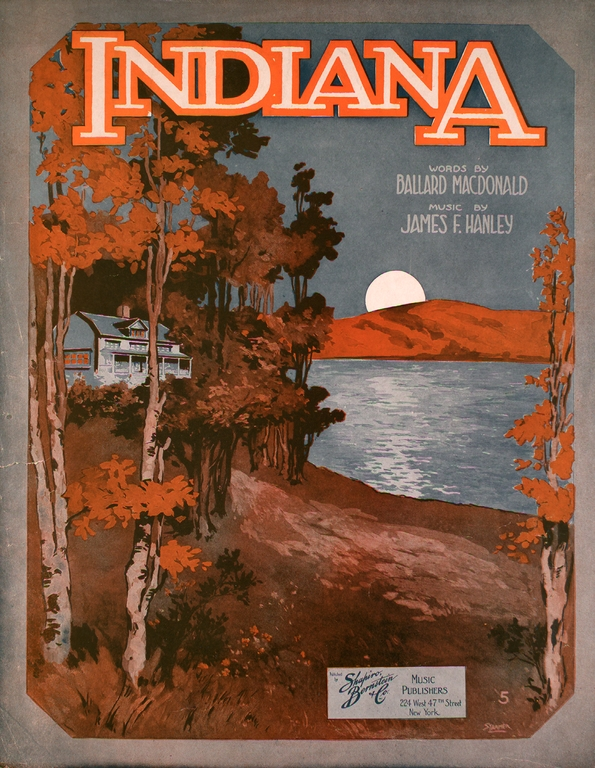
Hanley and MacDonald's "Indiana" (1917) is one of the most popular pre-1920s standards.

- 1915 – "I Ain't Got Nobody". Song composed by Spencer Williams with lyrics by Roger Graham. Charles Warfield, composer of "Baby Won't You Please Come Home", has disputed the song's authorship, asserting that he had composed it. Warfield copyrighted the song as "I Ain't Got Nobody and Nobody Cares for Me" with David Young and Marie Lucas in 1914. It was introduced by Bert Williams in vaudeville, where it was also a popular number for Sophie Tucker. The first of many hit records was by Marion Harris in 1917; Harris recorded the song several times afterwards. The 1939 film Paris Honeymoon with Bing Crosby revived the song's success, and Louis Prima recorded an influential arrangement of it in 1944, paired with "Just a Gigolo".
- 1915 – "Weary Blues". Ragtime number by Artie Matthews; the published lyrics by George Cates and Mort Greene are almost never performed. It was written for a competition that the publisher John Stark organized to compete with the success of W. C. Handy's "St. Louis Blues", and quickly became a hit. The first recording was by the Louisiana Five in 1919, and the New Orleans Rhythm Kings recorded their version in 1923. It was the first jazz number to be played in the White House. Originally titled "The Pastime Rag #8", the song is also known as "Shake It and Break It".
- 1916 – "Beale Street Blues". Blues song by W. C. Handy. Written about the lively black neighborhood in Memphis, Tennessee, the Beale Street, it was first recorded by Prince's Band in 1917. Earl Fuller's 1917 hit recording started Handy's commercial success as a composer, earning him more money in royalties than he had ever seen in one place. Gilda Gray's performance in the Broadway musical Gaieties of 1919 caused a sensation in Broadway circles previously unexposed to blues music. The song later became a signature tune of trombonist Jack Teagarden.
- 1916 – "Li'l Liza Jane". Song composed by Countess Ada de Lachau. It was recorded by Earl Fuller's Famous Jazz Band in 1917. It was based on earlier minstrel songs, and contains similarities with Stephen Foster's 1850 song "Camptown Races". Alison Krauss & Union Station's 1997 recording won a Grammy Award for Best Country Instrumental Performance. The song is also known as "Little Liza Jane" or "Liza Jane".
- 1917 – "Darktown Strutters' Ball". Popular song by Shelton Brooks. It was introduced by the vaudeville trio of Benny Fields, Benny Davis and Jack Salisbury. The Original Dixieland Jass Band's instrumental recording from 1917 (coupled with "Indiana" from the same session) is one of the earliest recorded jazz performances. It became an instant hit, selling over a million copies. Sheet music sales for the song exceeded three million. The song is also known as "At the Darktown Strutters' Ball" or "Strutters' Ball".
- 1917 – "Indiana". Popular song composed by James F. Hanley with lyrics by Ballard MacDonald. It was heavily influenced by the state song of Indiana, "On the Banks of the Wabash, Far Away", published by Paul Dresser in 1913. The Original Dixieland Jass Band's 1917 recording (with "Darktown Strutters' Ball") is one of the earliest recorded jazz performances. The song has been used as part of the Indianapolis 500 pre-race ceremonies since 1946, with the alternative title "Back Home Again in Indiana". The tradition is most closely associated with Jim Nabors, who performed the song almost every year starting in 1972 until 2014. The song is one of the most popular pre-1920s standards, and its chord progression has been used in numerous jazz compositions, including Miles Davis's 1947 tune "Donna Lee".
- 1917 – "Rose Room". Jazz song composed by Art Hickman with lyrics by Harry Williams. Also known as "In Sunny Roseland", the tune is usually played as an instrumental because of its flowery lyrics. First recorded by Joseph C. Smith's Orchestra in 1918, it was popularized by Duke Ellington in 1932; Ellington later used the tune's chord progression for his 1939 composition "In a Mellow Tone". Charlie Christian used the song as his "audition" piece for the Benny Goodman Sextet in 1939, appearing uninvited at a gig and playing a 45-minute rendition of the song with the band.
- 1917 – "Tiger Rag". Ragtime composition first recorded by the Original Dixieland Jass Band in 1917. The music was credited to band members Eddie Edwards, Nick La Rocca, Henry Ragas, Tony Sbarbaro and Larry Shields, and lyrics to Harry Da Costa; however, several New Orleans musicians claimed that the tune had already existed for years before the ODJB's recording. Jelly Roll Morton claimed in an interview that he had composed it. The music was possibly based on an old French quadrille. Louis Armstrong recorded the tune in 1930, and based his 1927 composition "Hotter Than That" on its chord progression. Art Tatum made an influential piano recording of the tune in 1932. Immediately popular after its initial release, the tune fell out of fashion during the swing era, and is rarely performed by jazz musicians today.

== 1918–1919 ==
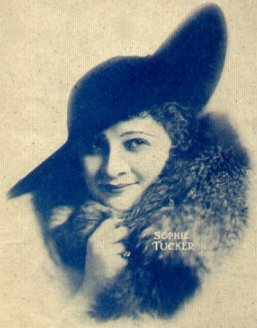
Vaudeville performer Sophie Tucker popularized the jazz standards "Some of These Days", "I Ain't Got Nobody" and "After You've Gone".

- 1918 – "After You've Gone". Popular song composed by Turner Layton with lyrics by Henry Creamer. Originally included in the musical So Long, Letty, it was introduced in vaudeville by Al Jolson. Marion Harris's recording reached number one in 1919. It was also performed by Judy Garland in the film For me and my Gal. The song was popularized by the 1927 recordings of Bessie Smith and Sophie Tucker, and Roy Eldridge recorded a famous solo with the Gene Krupa Orchestra in 1941. The song is the third most recorded pre-1920s standard, after "St. Louis Blues" and "Indiana".
- 1918 – "Clarinet Marmalade"'. Dixieland composition by Larry Shields of the Original Dixieland Jass Band. It is described as a "small-combo ensemble piece with strong links to the march tradition". It was influential on a number of jazz musicians in the 1920s, later popularized by Fletcher Henderson in 1926 and Frankie Trumbauer in 1927 and introduced to many white groups in the late 1920s. The original is dominated by Larry Shields's solo on clarinet, accompanied by Henry Ragas. In 1919, the song became a staple of the touring James Reese Europe band.
- 1918 – "Ja-Da". Popular song by Bob Carleton. It was written for singer Cliff Edwards, who became a big name in vaudeville due to the song's popularity. Arthur Fields made a hit recording in of it in 1918. The song was written as a parody of popular Asian-influenced songs of the early twentieth century. Thelonious Monk's unreleased 1952 composition "Sixteen" was based on the song's chord progression, also similar to Sonny Rollins's 1954 tune "Doxy". The song is also known as "Ja Da, Ja Da, Jing Jing Jing!".
- 1919 – "Baby Won't You Please Come Home". Blues song written by Charles Warfield and co-credited to publisher Clarence Williams. Williams published the sheet music in 1923, and the same year Bessie Smith recorded the first hit version. The song is often played as a ballad, although the sheet music indicates "medium bounce tempo". Williams himself recorded the song in 1928 with his Blue Five. Jo Stafford and Nat King Cole sang it in the 1945 film That's the Spirit.
- 1919 – "Royal Garden Blues". Blues song written by Spencer Williams and co-credited to publisher Clarence Williams. It is considered one of the first riff-based popular songs. The song was introduced by the George Morrison Jazz Orchestra in 1920 and popularized by the 1921 recordings of the Original Dixieland Jazz Band and Mamie Smith. Smith's recording with her Jazz Hounds has been called the earliest genuine jazz recording by a black ensemble. Bix Beiderbecke recorded an influential version in 1927. Darius Milhaud used the song in his ballet La création du monde.
- 1919 – "Someday Sweetheart". Jazz song credited to John Spikes. Publisher Spikes's brother and associate Reb Spikes was added to the credits when the song was copyrighted in 1924. Jelly Roll Morton, who recorded the song in 1923 and again in 1926, has claimed that the song was actually his idea. Alberta Hunter was the first to record the song in 1921, and Gene Austin had a best-selling record with the song in 1927.
- 1919 – "The World Is Waiting for the Sunrise". Popular ballad composed by Ernest Seitz with lyrics by Gene Lockhart. It was the first hit of Isham Jones and His Orchestra in 1922. Other popular versions were the Benson Orchestra's 1922 recording with an arrangement by Roy Bargy and Frank Banta's 1928 piano solo. The Firehouse Five Plus Two revived it in their 1950 recording, and Les Paul and Mary Ford made it a million-selling pop hit in 1951.

== Bibliography ==
=== Reference works ===
- America in the 20th Century. Marshall Cavendish Corporation. 2003. ISBN 0-7614-7364-5.
- Aquila, Richard (2000). That Old-Time Rock & Roll: A Chronicle of an Era, 1954-1963. University of Illinois Press. ISBN 0-252-06919-6.
- Axelrod, Steven Gould; Roman, Camille; Travisano, Thomas J. (2005). The New Anthology of American Poetry. Rutgers University Press. ISBN 0-8135-3164-0.
- Bearden, William; Phillips, Knox (2006). Memphis Blues: Birthplace of a Music Tradition. Arcadia Publishing. ISBN 0-7385-4237-7.
- Berlin, Edward A. (1995). King of Ragtime: Scott Joplin and His Era. Oxford University Press US. ISBN 0-19-510108-1.
- Blesh, Ridi (2007). They All Played Ragtime – The True Story of an American Music. Read Books. ISBN 978-1-4067-7326-2.
- Bogdanov, Vladimir; Woodstra, Chris; Erlewine, Stephen Thomas (2002). All Music Guide to Jazz: The Definitive Guide to Jazz Music. Backbeat Books. ISBN 0-87930-717-X.
- Brooks, Tim; Spottswood, Richard Keith (2004). Lost Sounds: Blacks and the Birth of the Recording Industry, 1890-1919. University of Illinois Press. ISBN 0-252-02850-3.
- Carr, Ian; Fairweather, Digby; Priestley, Brian; Alexander, Charles (2004). The Rough Guide to Jazz: The Essential Companion to Artists and Albums. Rough Guides. ISBN 1-84353-256-5.
- Charters, Samuel Barclay (1975). The Country Blues. Da Capo Press. ISBN 0-306-70678-4.
- Charters, Samuel Barclay (2008). A Trumpet Around the Corner: The Story of New Orleans Jazz. University Press of Mississippi. ISBN 978-1-57806-898-2.
- Christensen, Lawrence O. (1999). Dictionary of Missouri Biography. University of Missouri Press. ISBN 0-8262-1222-0.
- Collins, Ace (1999). Turn Your Radio On: The Stories Behind Gospel Music's All-Time Greatest Songs. Zondervan. ISBN 0-310-21153-0.
- Crawford, Richard; Magee, Jeffrey (1992). Jazz Standards on Record, 1900–1942: A Core Repertory. Center for Black Music Rsrch. ISBN 0-929911-03-2.
- De Stefano, George (2006). An Offer We Can't Refuse: The Mafia in the Mind of America. Macmillan. ISBN 0-571-21157-7.
- Dixon, Robert M. W. (1997). Blues and Gospel Records: 1890-1943. Oxford University Press. ISBN 0-19-816239-1.
- Egan, Bill (2004). Florence Mills: Harlem Jazz Queen. Scarecrow Press. ISBN 0-8108-5007-9.
- Evans, David (2008). Ramblin' on My Mind: New Perspectives on the Blues. University of Illinois Press. ISBN 978-0-252-07448-6.
- Fuld, James J. (2000). The Book of World-Famous Music: Classical, Popular, and Folk. Courier Dover Publications. ISBN 0-486-41475-2.
- Furia, Philip (1992). The Poets of Tin Pan Alley: A History of America's Great Lyricists. Oxford University Press US. ISBN 0-19-507473-4.
- Furia, Philip; Lasser, Michael L. (2006). America's Songs: The Stories Behind the Songs of Broadway, Hollywood, and Tin Pan Alley. CRC Press. ISBN 0-415-97246-9.
- Giddins, Gary (2000). Visions of Jazz: The First Century. Oxford University Press US. ISBN 0-19-513241-6.
- Gracyk, Tim; Hoffmann, Frank W. (2000). Popular American Recording Pioneers, 1895–1925. Haworth Press. ISBN 1-56024-993-5.
- Green, Stanley; Schmidt, Elaine (1999). Hollywood Musicals Year by Year. Hal Leonard Corporation. ISBN 0-634-00765-3.
- Hardie, Daniel (2002). Exploring Early Jazz: The Origins and Evolution of the New Orleans Style. iUniverse. ISBN 0-595-21876-8.
- Harwood, Robert W. (2008). I Went Down to St. James Infirmary: Investigations in the Shadowy World of Early Jazz-Blues in the Company of Blind Willie McTell, Louis Armstrong, Don Redman, Irving Mills, Carl Moore, and a Host of Others, and Where Did This Dang Song Come from Anyway?. Harland Press. ISBN 978-0-9809743-0-0.
- Hemming, Roy (1999). The Melody Lingers On: The Great Songwriters and Their Movie Musicals. Newmarket Press. ISBN 1-55704-380-9.
- Herder, Ronald (1998). 500 Best-Loved Song Lyrics. Courier Dover Publications. ISBN 0-486-29725-X.
- Herzhaft, Gérard; Harris, Paul; Debord, Brigitte; Haussler, Jerry; Mikofsky, Anton J. (1997). Encyclopedia of the Blues. University of Arkansas Press. ISBN 1-55728-452-0.
- Hodeir, André; Pautrot, Jean-Louis (2006). The André Hodeir Jazz Reader. University of Michigan Press. ISBN 0-472-06883-0.
- Hoffmann, Frank W.; Ferstler, Howard (2005). Encyclopedia of Recorded Sound. CRC Press. ISBN 0-415-93835-X.
- Holloway, Diane; Cheney, Bob (2001). American History in Song: Lyrics from 1900 to 1945. iUniverse. ISBN 0-595-19331-5.
- Hostetler, Lawrence (2007). Walk Your Way to Better Dance. Read Books. ISBN 978-1-4067-7508-2.
- Hughes, Langston; Rampersad, Arnold; Tracy, Steven Carl; Hubbard, Dolan; Sanders, Leslie Catherine (2001). The Collected Works of Langston Hughes. University of Missouri Press. ISBN 0-8262-1372-3.
- Jasen, David A. (2002). A Century of American Popular Music: 2000 Best-Loved and Remembered Songs (1899-1999). Taylor & Francis. ISBN 0-415-93700-0.
- Jasen, David A. (2003). Tin Pan Alley: An Encyclopedia of the Golden Age of American Song. Taylor & Francis. ISBN 0-415-93877-5.
- Jasen, David A. (2007). Ragtime: An Encyclopedia, Discography, and Sheetography. CRC Press. ISBN 978-0-415-97862-0.
- Kernfeld, Barry Dean (1995). The Blackwell Guide to Recorded Jazz. Wiley-Blackwell. ISBN 0-631-19552-1.
- Kirchner, Bill (2005). The Oxford Companion to Jazz. Oxford University Press US. ISBN 0-19-518359-2.
- Knapp, Raymond (2005). The American Musical and the Formation of National Identity. Princeton University Press. ISBN 0-691-11864-7.
- Koenig, Karl (2002). Jazz in Print (1856-1929): An Anthology of Selected Early Readings in Jazz History. Pendragon Press. ISBN 1-57647-024-5.
- Lomax, Alan; Gushee, Lawrence; Martin, David Stone (2001). Mister Jelly Roll: The Fortunes of Jelly Roll Morton, New Orleans Creole and "Inventor of Jazz". University of California Press. ISBN 0-520-22530-9.
- Martin, Henry; Waters, Keith (2005). Jazz: The First 100 Years. Cengage Learning. ISBN 0-534-62804-4.
- Matteson, Richard Jr. (2006). Bluegrass Picker's Tune Book. Mel Bay Publications. ISBN 0-7866-7160-2.
- Moon, Krystyn R. (2005). Yellowface: Creating the Chinese in American Popular Music and Performance, 1850s-1920s. Rutgers University Press. ISBN 0-8135-3507-7.
- Owsley, Dennis; Terry, Clark (2006). City of Gabriels: The History of Jazz in St. Louis, 1895-1973. Reedy Press. ISBN 1-933370-04-1.
- Oliphant, Dave (1996). Texan Jazz. University of Texas Press. ISBN 0-292-76045-0.
- Pastras, Philip (2003). Dead Man Blues: Jelly Roll Morton Way Out West. University of California Press. ISBN 0-520-23687-4.
- Powell, Neil (2000). The Language of Jazz. Taylor & Francis. ISBN 1-57958-277-X.
- Santoro, Gene (1995). Dancing in Your Head: Jazz, Blues, Rock, and Beyond. Oxford University Press US. ISBN 0-19-510123-5.
- Shaw, Arnold (1989). The Jazz Age: Popular Music in the 1920s. Oxford University Press US. ISBN 0-19-506082-2.
- Shuster, Gary (2006). From Manila to the Monkey Trial. Lulu.com. ISBN 1-4116-8422-2.
- Sisson, Richard; Zacher, Christian K.; Cayton, Andrew R. L. (2007). The American Midwest: An Interpretive Encyclopedia. Indiana University Press. ISBN 978-0-253-34886-9.
- Stanfield, Peter (2005). Body and Soul: Jazz and Blues in American Film, 1927–63. University of Illinois Press. ISBN 0-252-02994-1.
- Studwell, William Emmett (1997). The Americana Song Reader. Haworth Press. ISBN 0-7890-0150-0.
- Tosches, Nick (2003). Blackface. Au confluent des voix mortes (in French). Editions Allia. ISBN 2-84485-110-X.
- Tyler, Don (2008). Music of the Postwar Era. Greenwood Publishing Group. ISBN 978-0-313-34191-5.
- Waksman, Steve (2001). Instruments of Desire: The Electric Guitar and the Shaping of Musical Experience. Harvard University Press. ISBN 0-674-00547-3.
- Wilder, Alec; Maher, James T. (1972). American Popular Song: The Great Innovators, 1900–1950. Oxford University Press US. ISBN 0-19-501445-6.

=== Fake books ===
- The New Real Book, Volume II. Sher Music. 1991. ISBN 0-9614701-7-8.
- The Real Book, Volume I (6th ed.). Hal Leonard. 2004. ISBN 0-634-06038-4.
- The Real Book, Volume II (2nd ed.). Hal Leonard. 2007. ISBN 978-1-4234-2452-9.
- The Real Book, Volume III (2nd ed.). Hal Leonard. 2006. ISBN 0-634-06136-4.
- The Real Jazz Book. Warner Bros. ISBN 978-91-85041-36-7.
- The Real Vocal Book, Volume I. Hal Leonard. 2006. ISBN 0-634-06080-5.
