= Road to Perdition (soundtrack) =

Film score by Thomas Newman
- Released: June 25, 2002
- Genre: Soundtrack, Instrumental
- Length: 1:10:11
- Label: Decca

Thomas Newman chronology
The Salton Sea (2002)	Road to Perdition (2002)	White Oleander (2002)

Professional ratings
Review scores
Source	Rating
Allmusic	3/5 stars
Filmtracks	3.6/5 stars
SoundtrackNet	4.5/5 stars

Road to Perdition is the soundtrack, on the Decca Records label, of the 2002 Academy Award-winning and Golden Globe-nominated film Road to Perdition starring Tyler Hoechlin, Tom Hanks, Jennifer Jason Leigh, Jude Law, Daniel Craig and Paul Newman. The original score was composed by Thomas Newman.

The album was nominated for the Academy Award for Best Original Score, losing to the score of Frida.

== Track listing ==
Unless otherwise indicated, information is taken from Discogs and the album's liner notes

1. "Rock Island, 1931" – 3:22
2. "Wake" – 1:55
3. "Just the Feller" – 2:44
4. "Mr. Rance" – 1:38
5. "Bit Borrowers" – 2:25
6. "Murder (in Four Parts)" – 7:54
7. "Road to Chicago" – 3:06
8. "Reading Room" – 1:25
9. "Someday Sweetheart" – 3:06
  - Performed by The Charleston Chasers
  - Composed by John Spikes and Benjamin Franklin Spikes
  - Recorded 1927
10. "Meet Maguire" – 1:44
11. "Blood Dog" – 1:06
12. "Finn McGovern" – 2:11
13. "The Farm" – 2:09
14. "Dirty Money" – 3:10
15. "Rain Hammers" – 2:41
16. "A Blind Eye" – 2:27
17. "Nothing to Trade" – 2:25
18. "Queer Notions" – 2:46
  - Performed by Fletcher Henderson & His Orchestra
  - Composed by Coleman Hawkins
  - Arranged by Horace Henderson
  - Recorded 1933
19. "Virgin Mary" – 1:34
20. "Shoot the Dead" – 2:25
21. "Grave Drive" – 1:20
22. "Cathedral" – 2:40
  - Contains a Vocal Sample from the song "Alma Redemptoris Mater", Performed by Choir of King's College
  - Vocal Sample Recorded 1994
  - Lyrics Written by Juan García de Salazar
23. "There'll Be Some Changes Made" – 2:59
  - Performed by the Chicago Rhythm Kings
  - Written by Billy Higgins and W. Benton Overstreet
  - Vocals: Red McKenzie
  - Recorded 1928
24. "Ghosts" – 3:40
25. "Lexington Hotel, Room 1432" – 1:45
26. "Road to Perdition" – 3:55
27. "Perdition – Piano Duet" – 1:39
  - Performed by Tom Hanks and Paul Newman
  - Composed by John M. Williams

== Personnel ==
Information is taken from Discogs and the album's liner notes

Notable Musicians (tracks 1–8, 10–17, 19–22, 24–26)

- Thomas Newman - Orchestra conductor, Piano, Stroh violin
- Bill Bernstein - Hurdy Gurdy, Mandolin
- Nico Abondolo - Double Bass played by
- Jon Clarke - Oboe, Penny Whistle
- Rick Cox - Maracas, Additional Guitar, Metal Percussion
- George Doering - Bouzouki
- Michael Fisher - Bodhrán, Timpani, Glockenspiel, Metal Percussion
- Steve Kujala - Alto Flute, All Flutes
- Sid Page - Concertmaster
- Eric Rigler - Uilleann Pipes, Low Whistle
- Chas Smith - Pedal Steel Guitar
- Steve Tavaglione - Clarinet, EWI

Production

- Thomas Newman - Producer (1–8, 10–17, 19–22, 24–26)
- Bill Bernstein - Producer (1–8, 10–17, 19–22, 24–26), Music Editor
- George Budd - Music Consultant
- Julie Butchko - Music Clearance
- Peter Doell - Assistant Recording Engineer
- Meredith Friedman - Soundtrack Coordination
- Joe Gastwirt - Audio Mastering
- Tom Hardisty - Assistant Recording Engineer
- David Marquette - Assistant Recording Engineer
- Leslie Morris - Music Contractor
- Leah M. Panlilio - Soundtrack Coordination
- Thomas Pasatieri - Orchestration (1–8, 10–17, 19–22, 24–26)
- John Rodd - Assistant Recording Engineer
- Armin Steiner - Recording Engineer
- Tommy Vicari - Audio Mixing, Recording Engineer
- Paul Wertheimer - Assistant Recording Engineer
- Mike Zainer - Assistant Music Editor
