= Sunshine Records =

Sunshine Records may refer to:

- Sunshine Records (Australia), independent pop music record label in the mid-1960s.
- Sunshine Records (Philippines), 1977-1994 recording company of Vicor Music Corporation.
- Sunshine Records (United States), early 1920s Jazz and Blues record label in California.
- Sunshine Records (South Africa), Record label owned and run by Graeme Beggs, representing the Southern African interest of Abba, CLOUT, Circus, Pendulum, Mally and Billy Forest (William C. Boardman), through the 1970s and 1980s.
