= David Self =

American screenwriter (b. 1970)

- Born: January 8, 1970 (age 56); Texas City, Texas, U.S.
- Education: Stanford University
- Occupation: Screenwriter

David Christopher Self (born January 8, 1970) is an American screenwriter. His notable credits include The Haunting (1999), Road to Perdition (2002), and The Wolfman (2010).

== Early life and education ==
Self was born in Texas City, Texas on January 8, 1970. He was raised in Danvers, Massachusetts, where he graduated from St. John's Preparatory School. He received his bachelor's degree and master's degree in English literature from Stanford University. He moved to Los Angeles, California, after graduation; he had no contacts and got an entry-level job at Walt Disney Pictures in 1994.

== Career ==
=== Early efforts ===
His first script was a spec script titled Dawn's Early Light, a thriller about a terrorist attack on the White House. It was not produced, but it circulated widely in Hollywood. His first commissioned script was Firestorm, a dramatic film script based on the documentary film Fires of Kuwait. The script was purchased by Avatar Entertainment, a subsidiary of the Walt Disney Company, but the script went into development hell and was never produced. His second script, a 1996 or 1997 adaptation of Joseph R. Garber's 1995 novel of corporate espionage and assassination, Vertical Run, was commissioned by Warner Brothers, but it, too, went into development hell and was never produced.

His third script was Thirteen Days, based on the memoirs of John F. Kennedy advisor Kenneth O'Donnell. The semi-fictional script (which showed O'Donnell counseling Kennedy during the Cuban Missile Crisis) was commissioned by producer Armyan Bernstein, who had read Dawn's Early Light. Bernstein initially approached Self with the idea of a love story set against the background of the Cuban Missile Crisis, but Self convinced him to jettison the love story and write a straightforward history picture with O'Donnell as the "everyman" stand-in. Self began writing the script in the spring of 1997. Self worked closely with director Lawrence Kasdan on the script (Kasdan hoped to direct it). It was the first script of Self's to go into production, although it would be the second of his films released.

Self's fourth effort was Gates of Fire, a retelling of the Battle of Thermopylae from the point of a view of a young Spartan warrior who survives the battle. The script was based on Steven Pressfield's novel of the same name. Pressfield was the first writer chosen to adapt the novel, but Self was brought in to make major changes and finish it. It sold in 1998. Another script, Coup D'Etat (about a military overthrow of the government of the United States), also sold in 1998, but both films went into development hell and never emerged.

=== Feature film success ===
Prior to 1998, all the films Self worked on were for independent production companies. His first screenplay for a major studio was The Haunting, which he wrote for Steven Spielberg. After finishing Thirteen Days, Self showed the script to Spielberg. According to Self, Spielberg considered directing the picture for a time. Spielberg then asked Self to write his remake of the 1963 film, The Haunting. Spielberg worked directly with Self to work out the film. Made into a feature film in 1999, the script was heavily revised by screenwriter and novelist Michael Tolkin (including a new ending), although Self received sole writing credit.

When The Haunting went into production, Spielberg offered Self a one-year contract. It included office space at the DreamWorks studio and a blind script commitment.

The success of The Haunting led to another major project, Road to Perdition. Self was hired in July 2000 to adapt the DC Comics graphic novel by writer Max Allan Collins and illustrator Richard Piers Rayner. The film, directed by Sam Mendes, won plaudits for its acting, direction and cinematography, and was a box office hit. Self's script received positive attention, and Universal Studios hired him to do a rewrite of Tony Gilroy's screenplay for The Bourne Identity. He was uncredited for the script polish. Self then pitched The Wing, a World War I fighter-pilot picture, to Universal. While the spec script was purchased by the studio, it was never produced.

In 2005, Self pitched an untitled science fiction series to the Fox Network. Fox picked up the option to produce, and Breck Eisner directed a television movie (Beyond) in 2006. The backdoor pilot never was picked up as a series, however.

In 2006, Self was attached to two separate screenplays for films based on the superheroes Deathlok and Captain America. He also wrote an early draft based on another superhero, Namor.

In 2007, Self did a major rewrite of Andrew Kevin Walker's script for the werewolf movie, The Wolfman. Self added extensive characterization, built up the relationship between father and son, and added more than 17 pages of dialogue and action at the behest of director Joe Johnston. Johnston ordered Self to do a second rewrite just four weeks before shooting was to begin. Self also helped contribute additional rewrites during five weeks of reshooting in the spring of 2009. Self's second script had a long sequence in which the werewolf terrorizes London, and his ending for the film was less ambiguous. In 2008, Johnston cut the London sequence from the film and asked Self to make the ending more ambiguous. But in the editing room, it was clear that these sequences needed to be retained. Self also helped with new material for the ending. Self's second rewrite ended with werewolf Lawrence Talbot surviving. But during reshoots, Self scripted an ending in which both werewolves (Sir John Talbot and Lawrence Talbot) die. Reshoots beefed up the ending in which both characters died, and this version made it into the film.

While Self was working on The Wolfman, Metro-Goldwyn-Mayer (MGM) hired him to script a RoboCop remake in July 2008. However, after much delay (primarily due to MGM's financial difficulties and November 2010 bankruptcy), RoboCop went into turnaround. The film was eventually produced with a different script, and released in 2014.

In 2011, Paramount Pictures hired Self to script a feature film based on author John Scalzi's Old Man's War series of novels. The story follow the adventures of an elderly man who receives a genetically enhanced body that allows him to avenge the death of his wife by joining the military. Self also worked in 2012 on a film adaptation of the video game series God of War. Self wrote a first draft of a script, but the screenwriting duties were then given to Patrick Melton and Marcus Dunstan. Self will executive produce the picture, his first production credit.

== Filmography ==
Year	Title	Director	Notes
1999	The Haunting	Jan de Bont	
2000	Thirteen Days	Roger Donaldson	
2002	Road to Perdition	Sam Mendes	
2002	The Bourne Identity	Doug Liman	Unused early draft
2010	The Wolfman	Joe Johnston	with Andrew Kevin Walker
2025	Desert Warrior	Rupert Wyatt	with Wyatt and Erica Beeney

== Awards and nominations ==
Award	Year	Category	Work	Result
Edgar Award	2003	Best Motion Picture Screenplay	Road to Perdition	Nominated
Golden Raspberry Award	2000	Worst Screenplay	The Haunting	Nominated
London Film Critics' Circle Award	2003	Screenwriter of the Year	Road to Perdition	Nominated
Phoenix Film Critics Society Award	2003	Best Screenplay - Adapted	Road to Perdition	Nominated
Satellite Award	2001	Best Adapted Screenplay	Thirteen Days	Nominated
