= Grandpa's Spells =

Song by Jelly Roll Morton

"Grandpa's Spells" is an early jazz song by Jelly Roll Morton. He recorded it for Gennett Records, Richmond, Indiana (the Star Piano factory) on 18 July 1923 along with "Kansas City Stomp" and "Wolverine Blues". It was released in 1924.

The song was also recorded by the Canadian Brass (Toccata, Fugues, and other diversions (1977), Opening Day Recordings 57730).
