= John Patrick Looney =

American criminal entrepreneur, lawyer and politician

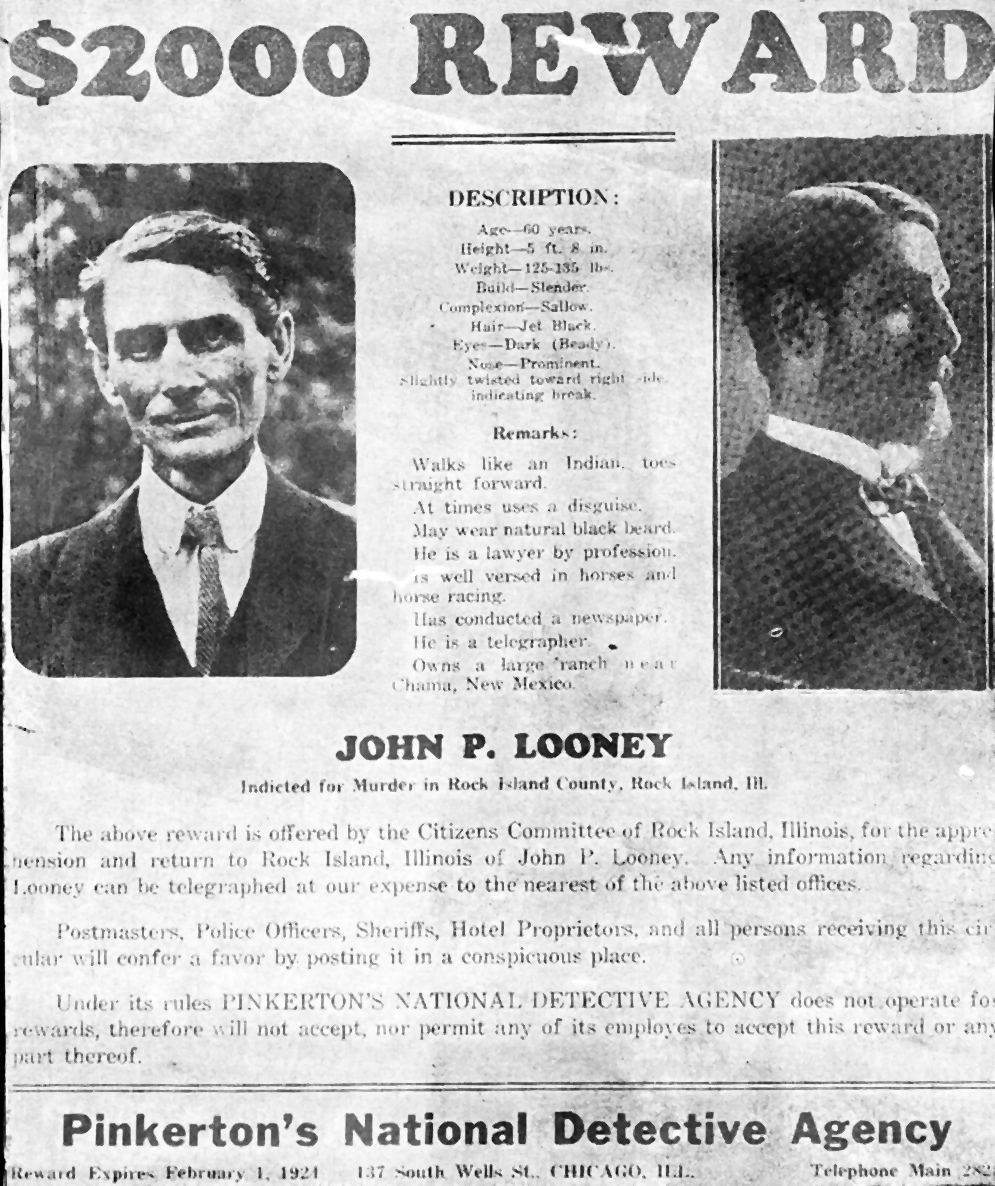
Reward poster for the capture of Looney issued after the 1922 murder of William Gabel

John Patrick Looney (1865–1942) was an American political fixer and Irish mob boss based in Rock Island, Illinois during the early 20th century. At the height of his power, Looney controlled most of the illegal gambling, prostitution, bootlegging, and racketeering in Rock Island. Through his tabloid newspaper Rock Island News, he was able to blackmail and intimidate his opponents.

Looney's empire came to an end when he was eventually indicted for murder after a gang war in 1922. He went on the run but was captured two years later. In 1925, he was convicted of murder and numerous other crimes. He served only eight and a half years.

Looney is the inspiration for the character of John Rooney, who was played by Paul Newman in the Sam Mendes film Road to Perdition. Furthermore, Looney's family house still survives in the Highland Park Historic District in Rock Island.

== Background ==
John Looney, son of Irish immigrants, was born in Ottawa, Illinois. He studied law and was admitted to the Illinois Bar in 1889. He practiced with his partner Frank H. Kelly; he had his first real brush with the law in 1897 when he and Kelly were indicted for conspiracy to defraud the city by using inferior materials. The convictions were overturned on appeal.

Looney soon ventured into politics, and went on to hold a prominent position in the Democratic Party. He would eventually run for, but lose, election to the Illinois State Legislature.

== Rock Island News ==
Looney attributed his loss at the election to the Rock Island Argus, which wrote many negative opinion articles on him. In response, Looney founded the Rock Island News, which he used to blackmail prominent Rock Island citizens.

In 1905, Looney bought the Mirror Lounge, a closed club to use for his law office on the 1st floor and to publish his newspaper on the second floor. After purchasing the building, John brought his brothers William (Bill) and Jeremiah (Jerry) to Rock Island from Ottawa to help him run the paper. During the early 20th century, Looney published many articles that attacked the Rock Island Argus and threaten to expose the deep dark secrets some of Rock Island's most prominent residents. The residents attacked by Looney threats were blackmailed into paying "kill fees" to kill articles before they were published. However, by 1908, Looney was desperate for money to keep all of his operations afloat, so he was forced to sell Rock Island News to W.W. Wilmerton.

However, Looney had no plans to relinquish his control of the newspaper. The night after Looney sold the paper, Wilmerton shut down the newspaper, which angered Looney. Later that night, a bomb exploded at the printing press in the newspaper's building, which Looney still owned. Looney refused a $7,000 insurance settlement, and the insurance company canceled his policy. In November, two mysterious fires would destroy the Mirror Lounge. The first fire on November 2 caused $32,000 worth of damage to the building, destroying the Mirror Saloon, run by Dan Drost. The second fire started the day before the insurance was canceled, causing $75,000 worth of damage to the Mirror building. Looney was accused of setting the fire by Dan Drost; he later admitted to helping Looney set the fire.

With Looney unable to publish his newspaper for a year after he sold it, he was left powerless in Rock Island politics since he was unable to blackmail its residents. Looney resumed his publishing from the garage on the side of his house called "The Roost" in 1909. When Looney began publishing his newspaper again for the first time on February 6, 1909, he personally attacked Wilmerton and his family on the front page.

This personal attack of Wilmerton family led to a downtown shootout on February 22, 1909. Near the Safety on 3rd Avenue and 18th Street in Rock Island Illinois Looney was shot in the side, but he was not seriously injured. Wilmerton was arrested, but was never charged with a crime. The "Bel-Aire" house at which this gunfight occurred can be viewed just slightly west of 30th street in Rock Island on River Heights Road. Looney was also subject to several other failed attempts to kill him.

== Crime ==
Looney had a hand in match fixing, prostitution, illegal gambling, and extortion. Gambling and prostitution took place in the basement of the building which housed the Rock Island News. He had also been accused of extortion and blackmail. He allegedly would have one of his prostitutes walk up to a man and throw her arms around him, and once she did he would snap a photograph. Looney would then threaten to publish the photograph in the Rock Island News unless a cash payment was provided.

== Riots ==
In March 1912, one of Looney's lieutenants, Anthony Billburg, was arrested for extortion. According to accounts, Looney asked the Mayor of Rock Island, Harry M. Schriver, not to prosecute Billburg. After Schriver refused, Looney published an article on the front page of his paper accusing him of having an affair in Peoria. In response, Schriver had Looney arrested and closed down the Rock Island News on March 22.

Four days later, a large crowd gathered in Market Square, stirred and agitated by associates of Looney. They stormed the police station. Attempts by the police to quell the mob resulted in the death of two rioters.

The riots prompted Governor Charles Deneen to declare martial law in Rock Island and ordered the National Guard to the city. Throughout the night there were minor disturbances which were resolved whenever the National Guard troops made an appearance. After the riots, raids were carried out on prostitution houses. All public gatherings were banned, and all saloons were closed. Afterward, Looney left Rock Island to go to a ranch in New Mexico, staying there until 1921.

== Homecoming ==
In 1921 Looney returned to Rock Island and regained control of his paper. With Prohibition now the law, he had control of approximately 150 gambling dens and brothels. Looney extorted protection from local business in collaboration with corrupt police officers and politicians.

== Downfall ==
In 1922, before a national convention of the fremasonic Grotto, Looney's thugs provided – i.e. sold – protection for law violators. Prohibition agents, following up on raids made during the convention met with William Gabel, who provided them with canceled checks endorsed by John Looney. Gabel was murdered on July 31, 1922, which prompted a gang war in which 12 people were murdered. Meanwhile, through editorials, the Rock Island Argus lambasted the community for having allowed gangsters to gain control of Rock Island. In return, Looney's paper published articles implicating the Argus in Gabel's murder.

The gang war ended on October 6, 1922, when Looney and his son Connor were talking in their car in Market Square. Two vehicles pulled up behind them and opened fire. John Looney ran to the nearby Sherman Hotel and returned fire. Connor Looney was killed in the vehicle.

On October 26, 1922, all stills, speakeasies, and brothels under Looney's control were closed down, and his house was raided for weapons. Schriver and the former police chief were arrested and later convicted of vice protection conspiracy. Looney was indicted for the murder of William Gabel and for running a theft ring which spanned several states, but Looney fled to Ottawa, Illinois and then to New Mexico.

Looney was apprehended in New Mexico in November 1924. He was convicted in 1925 of "conspiracy to protect gambling, prostitution and illicit liquor traffic in Rock Island".

Looney was later charged and convicted of the murder of Willam Gabel and prosecuted in Galesburg. He was sentenced to 14 years in prison and served eight and a half years. Looney died in 1942 at a tuberculosis sanitarium in El Paso, Texas.

== Fictional portrayals ==
John Looney served as the model for John Rooney, a major character in Max Allan Collins' graphic novel Road to Perdition. The character was portrayed by Paul Newman in Sam Mendes' 2002 film adaptation.

In the film, the war between loyal lieutenant Dan Drost is the basis for the war between Michael Sullivan and John Rooney.
