= Sunshine Records (United States) =

Sunshine Records was a small California-based record label of the early 1920s, producing 6 double-sided phonograph records of early jazz and blues.

The labels of Sunshine Records say that they were "Manuf. by Spikes Bros. Phonograph Co. Inc. Los Angeles", but they were all actually manufactured by Nordskog Records, and also issued by Nordskog. Most Sunshine Records simply have the Sunshine label pasted over the Nordskog label. (It is believed that the labels were supposed to be pressed onto the records, but Arto Records, who pressed Nordskog's records, made this error.)

The Spikes Brothers (John and Reb Spikes) were the owner/operators of a Los Angeles, California music store which catered to the city's African-American community. The Spikes Brothers also published sheet music both by themselves and other songwriters, mostly, they later recalled, to help draw attention to numbers they hoped to sell to national music publishers. The Spikes Brothers arranged with Nordskog to sell copies of records by African-American artists in their store on their own label. It is believed that all copies of the rare Sunshine Records were sold only at the Spikes Brothers Music Store.

All of the Sunshine Records feature Kid Ory's New Orleans jazz band. Two sides are instrumentals by the band; on the rest Ory's group accompanies singers Roberta Dudley and Ruth Lee.

Back in 1995, Sunshine Records signed the upcoming rapper - Skee-Lo and he released his hit album ‘I Wish’. He left the label only five months after due to a dispute with Sunshine Records.

== See also ==
- Sunshine Records (Australia)
- List of record labels
- Nordskog Records
