= Kansas City Stomp =

Song performed by Jelly Roll Morton

"Kansas City Stomp" is a jazz standard by Jelly Roll Morton, first recorded in 1923. It has been described as "one of his (Morton's) happiest pieces". Morton was inspired in naming it after playing at a bar named "Kansas City Bar" in Tijuana. It has nothing to do with Kansas City itself. The song was inducted into the Grammy Hall of Fame in 2010.

== Composition and recording ==
In 1921, Jelly Roll Morton established himself in Los Angeles and assembled a group to play gigs all over southern California. He played as far south as Tijuana, where he performed at the Kansas City Bar. His experience there inspired him to compose "Kansas City Stomp". He also wrote "The Pearls", another jazz tune, for one of the waitresses at the bar.

Morton recorded the tune in Richmond, Indiana on 18 July 1923 along with "Wolverine Blues" and "Grandpa's Spells".
