= Wolverine Blues (song) =

Song
- Released: 1923
- Recorded: 18 July 1923
- Genre: Jazz
- Composer: Jelly Roll Morton
- Lyricists: Benjamin Franklin "Reb" Spikes; John Curry Spikes

"Wolverine Blues" is an early jazz standard by Jelly Roll Morton with lyrics by the brothers Benjamin Franklin "Reb" Spikes and John Curry Spikes.

He recorded it in Richmond, Indiana on 18 July 1923 along with "Kansas City Stomp" and "Grandpa's Spells".
