= Beale Street Blues =

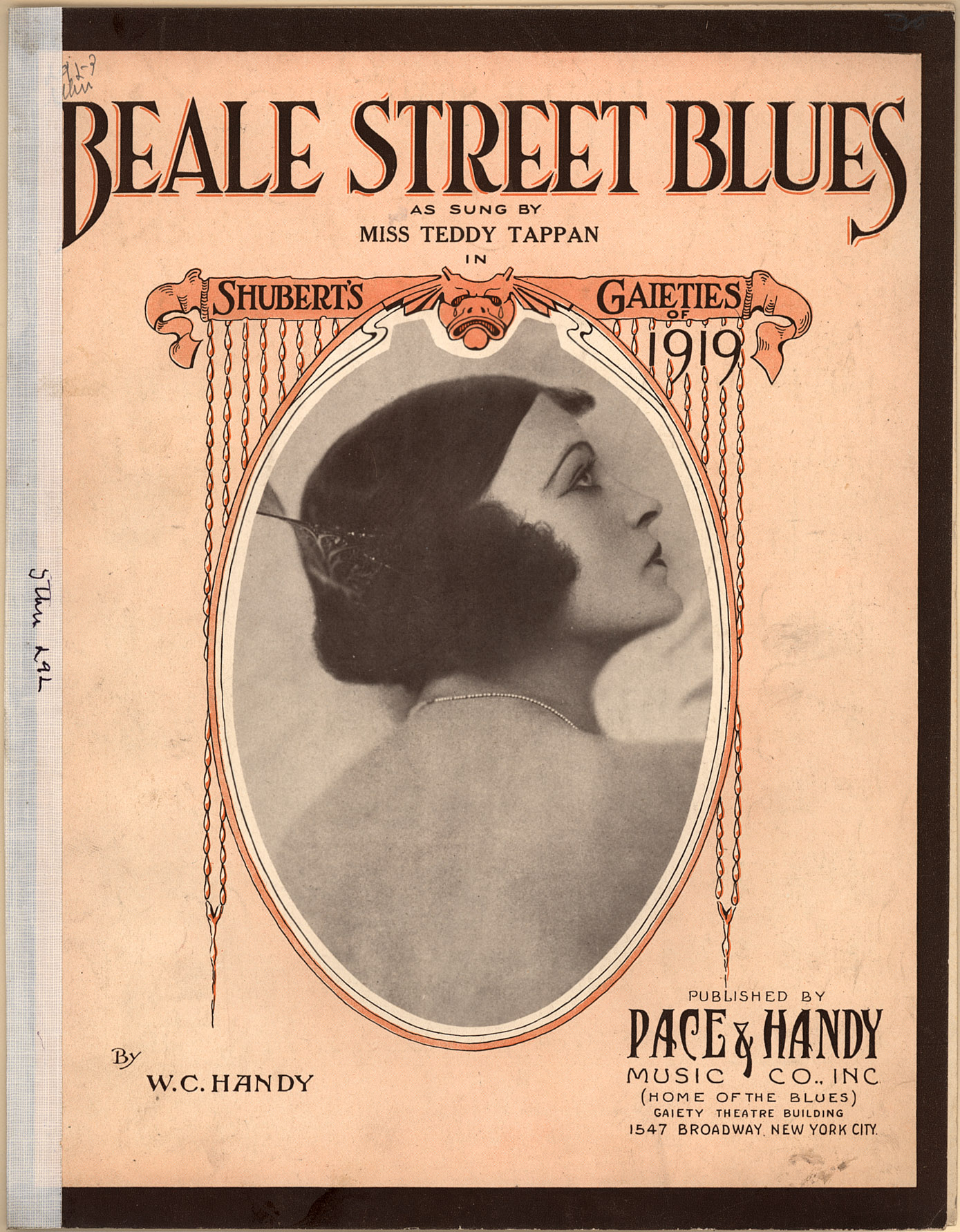
- Sheet music cover

Song by Gilda Gray
- Published: 1917
- Genre: Blues
- Songwriter: W.C. Handy

"Beale Street Blues" is a song by American composer and lyricist W.C. Handy. It was named after Beale Street, a center of African-American music in Memphis, Tennessee, and was published in 1917.

== Background ==
The title refers to Beale Street in Memphis, Tennessee, an entertainment district for the city's African-American population in the early part of the 20th century. Accounts of Handy's inspiration vary: one is that he observed a pianist playing in a cafe on that street; another credits a barber commenting on closing early because no one had been murdered on the street that day.

== Composition and lyrics ==
"Beale Street Blues" juxtaposes the 12-bar blues form with an 8-bar counter-theme". The song was published in 1917. Difficulty in securing a good publishing deal meant that Handy published it himself.

== Early versions ==
The publication of the song coincided with the beginning of jazz recordings. An early version by Earl Fuller's Famous Jazz Band earned Handy's firm $2,857 in royalties. A version by singer Marion Harris was a top 10 hit in December 1921. More typically, however, in the early years after it was written, jazz musicians played instrumental versions of the song.

== Later versions and influence ==
Jack Teagarden used the song as a vocal showcase in the 1930s and 1940s, and recorded it with several bands in that period. In the big band era, only a few of the well-known bands recorded it; these included Tommy Dorsey and Duke Ellington. Since the 1950s, the song has been associated with trad bands.

Jelly Roll Morton and his Red Hot Peppers recorded the tune for Victor in Chicago on September 21, 1926, released as Victor 20415, backed with Morton's own "The Pearls".

== See also ==
- List of pre-1920 jazz standards
