= Richard Piers Rayner =

English comic artist

- Areas: Penciller, Artist
- Notable works: Road to Perdition; Hellblazer
- Awards: Russ Manning Promising Newcomer Award (1989)

Richard Piers Rayner (/ˈreɪnər/) is an English comic book artist. He is best known for his work on Road to Perdition.

== Biography ==
Richard Piers Rayner began his professional comic career in 1988, illustrating for DC Comics and Marvel Comics. His works include Hellblazer, Swamp Thing, L.E.G.I.O.N., Doctor Fate, and Doctor Who. His most notable work is Road to Perdition, written by Max Allan Collins, which was adapted into a film in 2002, starring Tom Hanks, and directed by Sam Mendes.

He is also a frequent contributor to the DC publications, Paradox Press, and is artist in residence at Middlesbrough FC. In November 2008 he wrote and illustrated Middlesbrough FC - The Unseen History.

== Awards ==
- 1989: Won the "Russ Manning Promising Newcomer" Eisner Award

== Bibliography ==
His comics work includes:

- Hellblazer #10-16 (with Jamie Delano, Vertigo, 1988-1989)
- The Big Book Of (Paradox Press):
  - Big Book of Urban Legends
  - Big Book of Weirdos
  - Big Book of Death
  - Big Book of Conspiracies
  - Big Book of Freaks
  - Big Book of Little Criminals
  - Big Book of Losers
  - Big Book of the Weird Wild West
  - Big Book of Grimm
- Road to Perdition (with Max Allan Collins, 204 pages, Pocket Books, June 1998, ISBN 0-671-00921-4, Titan Books, August 2002, ISBN 1-84023-534-9, Simon & Schuster, July 2002, ISBN 0-7434-4224-5, Paradox Press, April 2005, ISBN 1-56389-449-1)
