= Someday Sweetheart =

1919 jazz standard by John and Reb Spikes

Single by Alberta Hunter
- B-side: "How Long, Sweet Daddy, How Long"
- Published: 1919
- Released: February 24, 1923
- Recorded: May 1921
- Genre: Jazz
- Length: 3:02
- Label: Paramount
- Songwriters: John Spikes and Reb Spikes

"Someday Sweetheart" is a jazz standard written by Los Angeles–based musicians John and Reb Spikes in 1919. It was the biggest hit the brothers wrote, and was performed by many recording artists of the period. The first one to record the tune was blues singer Alberta Hunter. Jelly Roll Morton recorded the song twice, in 1923 and 1926.

The song was especially popular in 1927 with versions by Gene Austin, King Oliver and by The Charleston Chasers being particularly prominent. Other artists who have recorded the song include Chet Atkins, Mildred Bailey, Count Basie, Bing Crosby, Kenny Davern, Jimmy Dorsey, Woody Herman, Frankie Laine, Dinah Shore, Meade "Lux" Lewis, Johnny Mercer, Leon Redbone and Teddy Wilson.

== See also ==
- List of pre-1920 jazz standards
