= Road to Perdition (comics) =

American works by Max Allan Collins

Publication information
- Publisher: Paradox Press
- Original language: English
- Publication date: 1998

Creative team
- Writer(s): Max Allan Collins
- Artist(s): Richard Piers Rayner

Reprints
- Collected editions
- Road to Perdition: ISBN 1-56389-449-1
- Road to Perdition: On the Road: ISBN 1401203574

Road to Perdition is a series of fictional works written by Max Allan Collins.

The comic book of the original series, with art by Richard Piers Rayner, was published by DC Comics' imprint Paradox Press. It was adapted into the 2002 film of the same name, starring Tom Hanks, for which Collins also wrote the novelization.

== Stories ==
- Road to Perdition

Michael O'Sullivan, the ruthless but honorable enforcer for an Irish crime syndicate, is personally betrayed by his masters and is forced to flee with his young son Michael, Jr. on a quest for revenge. The story is set in the American Midwest during the Great Depression and draws upon several historical figures, especially the gangster John Patrick Looney, of Rock Island, Illinois; in real life, Looney came into conflict with Dan Drost, a formerly loyal lieutenant in their crime organization, and their feud eventually led to the death of Looney's son Connor.

This story had many inspirations, such as the Japanese manga series Lone Wolf and Cub, the life story of Irish American crime boss John Patrick Looney, and various gangster films such as The Godfather and The St. Valentine's Day Massacre.

This story was the basis for the 2002 film of the same name.

- On the Road to Perdition

This three-part miniseries of graphic novels was written after the original story, but deals with events within the same timeframe. All three parts were published as individual installments, but have also been reprinted as a single combined volume.

- Road to Purgatory and Road to Paradise

These two prose sequels deal with the adult life of Michael O'Sullivan, Jr., under his adoptive identity of Michael Satariano. After military service in Bataan during World War II, he returns to the world of organized crime to seek revenge on other gangsters who had been complicit in his father's death by posing as a senior member of the Chicago Outfit. Years later, having put his criminal past behind him, Michael is framed by a Chicago mobster for a hit he refused to carry out, forcing him to once again go on the run (accompanied by his teenage daughter) as he attempts to finally end his family's cycle of violence and revenge.

In 2008 Collins was attached to write and direct the film adaptation of Road to Purgatory, but in 2011 Collins reported that the sequel had not yet received funding or official green light.

- Return to Perdition

This graphic novel follows the story of Michael Satariano, Jr., a Vietnam vet who returns home from the war and gets caught up in the criminal underworld of his father and grandfather.

== Influences ==
Series author Collins acknowledged the influence of the Japanese manga Lone Wolf and Cub by Kazuo Koike and Goseki Kojima on his work with Road to Perdition, saying in an interview to the BBC that "Road To Perdition is 'an unabashed homage' to Lone Wolf And Cub".

Ethan Iverson mentions in his detailed online bibliography for Donald E. Westlake, that Collins adapted some dialogue in the graphic novel (later included in altered form in the film adaptation) from a very similar scene in the Parker novel, Butcher's Moon.

== Publications ==
=== Graphic novels ===
- Road to Perdition (by Max Allan Collins, with Richard Piers Rayner, 304 pages):
  - Pocket Books, June 1998, ISBN 0-671-00921-4
  - Titan Books, August 2002, ISBN 1-84023-534-9
  - Simon & Schuster, July 2002, ISBN 0-7434-4224-5
  - Paradox Press, April 2005, ISBN 1-56389-449-1)
- On the Road to Perdition Book 1: Oasis (with José Luis García-López and Josef Rubinstein), 96 pages.
  - Paradox Press, May 2003, ISBN 1-4012-0068-0
  - Titan Books, June 2003, ISBN 1-84023-689-2)
- On the Road to Perdition Book 2: Sanctuary (with José Luis García-López and Steve Lieber), 96 pages.
  - Paradox Press, December 2003, ISBN 1-4012-0173-3
  - Titan Books, March 2004, ISBN 1-84023-796-1)
- On the Road to Perdition Book 3: Detour (with José Luis García-López and Steve Lieber), 96 pages.
  - Paradox Press, July 2004, ISBN 1-4012-0174-1
  - Titan Books, October 2004, ISBN 1-84023-942-5)
- Road to Perdition: On the Road, 296 pages (single-volume collection of Books 1-3).
  - Paradox Press, December 2004, ISBN 1-4012-0357-4
  - Titan Books, May 2005, ISBN 1-84576-023-9
- Return to Perdition (by Max Allan Collins, with Terry Beatty, 192 pages).
  - Vertigo, August 2011.

=== Prose ===
- Road to Perdition (film novelization), 256 pages, Onyx, June 2002, ISBN 0-451-41029-7, ISBN 978-0-451-41029-0)
- Road to Purgatory (288 pages, by William Murrow, 2004, ISBN 0-06-054027-3)
- Road to Paradise (289 pages, by William Murrow, 2005, ISBN 978-0-06-054028-9, ISBN 0-06-054028-1)
