= Road to Perdition =

2002 film directed by Sam Mendes

- Theatrical release poster
- Directed by: Sam Mendes
- Screenplay by: David Self
- Based on: Road to Perdition (1998 graphic novel) by: Max Allan Collins; Richard Piers Rayner
- Produced by: Richard D. Zanuck; Dean Zanuck; Sam Mendes
- Starring: Tom Hanks; Paul Newman; Jude Law; Jennifer Jason Leigh; Stanley Tucci; Daniel Craig
- Cinematography: Conrad L. Hall
- Edited by: Jill Bilcock
- Music by: Thomas Newman
- Production company: The Zanuck Company
- Distributed by: DreamWorks Pictures (U.S.); 20th Century Fox (International)
- Release date: July 12, 2002 (U.S.)
- Running time: 117 minutes
- Country: United States
- Language: English
- Budget: $80 million
- Box office: $183.4 million

Road to Perdition is a 2002 American crime drama film directed and produced by Sam Mendes, from a screenplay by David Self, based on the first volume of the DC Comics graphic novel series by Max Allan Collins and Richard Piers Rayner. It stars Tom Hanks, Paul Newman (in his final live-action theatrical film role), Jude Law, Jennifer Jason Leigh, Stanley Tucci, and Daniel Craig. Set in 1931, during the Great Depression, the film follows a mob enforcer and his son as they seek vengeance against the mobster who murdered the rest of their family. The film explores themes such as father-son relationships and the consequences of violence.

Road to Perdition was screened at the 59th Venice International Film Festival on August 31, 2002, where it was nominated for the Golden Lion. The film was theatrically released in the United States on July 12, 2002, and was a box office success, grossing $183.4 million against its $80 million budget. Critics received it well and praised Mendes's direction, Conrad L. Hall's cinematography, and the cast's performances. At the 75th Academy Awards, the film was nominated for Best Supporting Actor for Newman, Best Original Score, Best Sound Editing, Best Sound Mixing, and Best Art Direction. Hall was posthumously awarded the Oscar for Best Cinematography.

== Plot ==
In the winter of 1931, Michael Sullivan Sr, is an orphaned enforcer of Irish Mob boss John Rooney in Rock Island, Illinois. His wife Annie knows of his work, but his two sons Michael Jr. and Peter do not. Rooney's associate Finn McGovern speaks at his brother's wake, insinuating that Rooney is responsible for his brother's death. Rooney sends Sullivan and his son Connor to talk with McGovern; Michael follows them and watches the interaction from hiding.

McGovern denies that his brother stole anything from the mob and implies that Connor was responsible, which causes Connor to murder McGovern and Sullivan to shoot the other armed witnesses in self-defense. The men discover that Michael saw everything and swear him to secrecy.

Rooney sends Sullivan to collect a debt from speakeasy owner Tony Calvino. Jealous and paranoid, Connor sends a letter with Sullivan for Calvino. Calvino reads the letter and reaches for his revolver, but Sullivan kills him and his bodyguard. The letter reads, "Kill Sullivan and all debts are paid". Sullivan rushes home and discovers that Connor, suspecting Michael has told others of the murders, has already murdered Annie and Peter. Michael was unharmed, as he had arrived home late from detention.

Sullivan and Michael flee Rock Island and head to Chicago to meet mobster Frank Nitti. Sullivan offers to work for the Chicago Outfit in exchange for permission to kill Connor. Nitti rejects his offer and advises Sullivan against seeking revenge. Rooney, listening next door with Connor, reluctantly allows Nitti to dispatch contract killer Harlen Maguire with orders to kill both Sullivan and Michael.

Sullivan plans to take Michael to his aunt's beach house in Perdition as a haven. Maguire tracks them to a roadside diner, where he and Sullivan converse casually while Michael sleeps in the car. Sensing danger, Sullivan escapes from Maguire with Michael, and Maguire kills a police officer in the process. Sullivan realises Maguire knows their destination, and begins robbing the banks that hold the Outfit's money, hoping to pressure the Outfit into withdrawing their protection from Connor. Sullivan teaches Michael to drive so that he can act as a getaway driver.

When the mob withdraws its money from its banks, Sullivan interrogates Rooney's accountant, Alexander Rance. Rance stalls Sullivan until Maguire appears with a shotgun. During the shootout and escape, Maguire and Sullivan wound each other and Rance is killed in the crossfire. Sullivan collapses from his wound, and Michael drives them to a farm where an elderly couple helps Sullivan recover.

Rance's ledgers reveal that Connor has been embezzling from his father using dead men's names, including McGovern's. Believing that Rooney will give up Connor once he knows the truth, Sullivan returns to Rock Island and confronts Rooney, who is already aware of Connor's treachery. Sullivan states that Connor will be dead anyway once Rooney dies; Rooney still refuses to give up his son, urging Sullivan to flee with Michael and raise him to be a better man than either of them. Sullivan later ambushes and kills Rooney's bodyguards before reluctantly killing Rooney. Nitti reveals Connor's location after Sullivan promises to end the feud with Connor's death. Sullivan goes to the hotel room where Connor is hiding and kills him.

The Sullivans finally reach the beach house in Perdition. While Michael is outside, Sullivan enters the house, where Maguire shoots him in the back. Michael appears and points a gun at Maguire, and Sullivan fatally shoots Maguire while he is distracted. Sullivan is happy that his son did not shoot, and then dies in Michael's arms.

Michael drives the car back to the elderly couple's farm and stays with them. In his narration, Michael states he has not held a gun since his father's death, and when asked if his father was a good man, "I always give the same answer. I just tell them he was my father."

== Cast ==
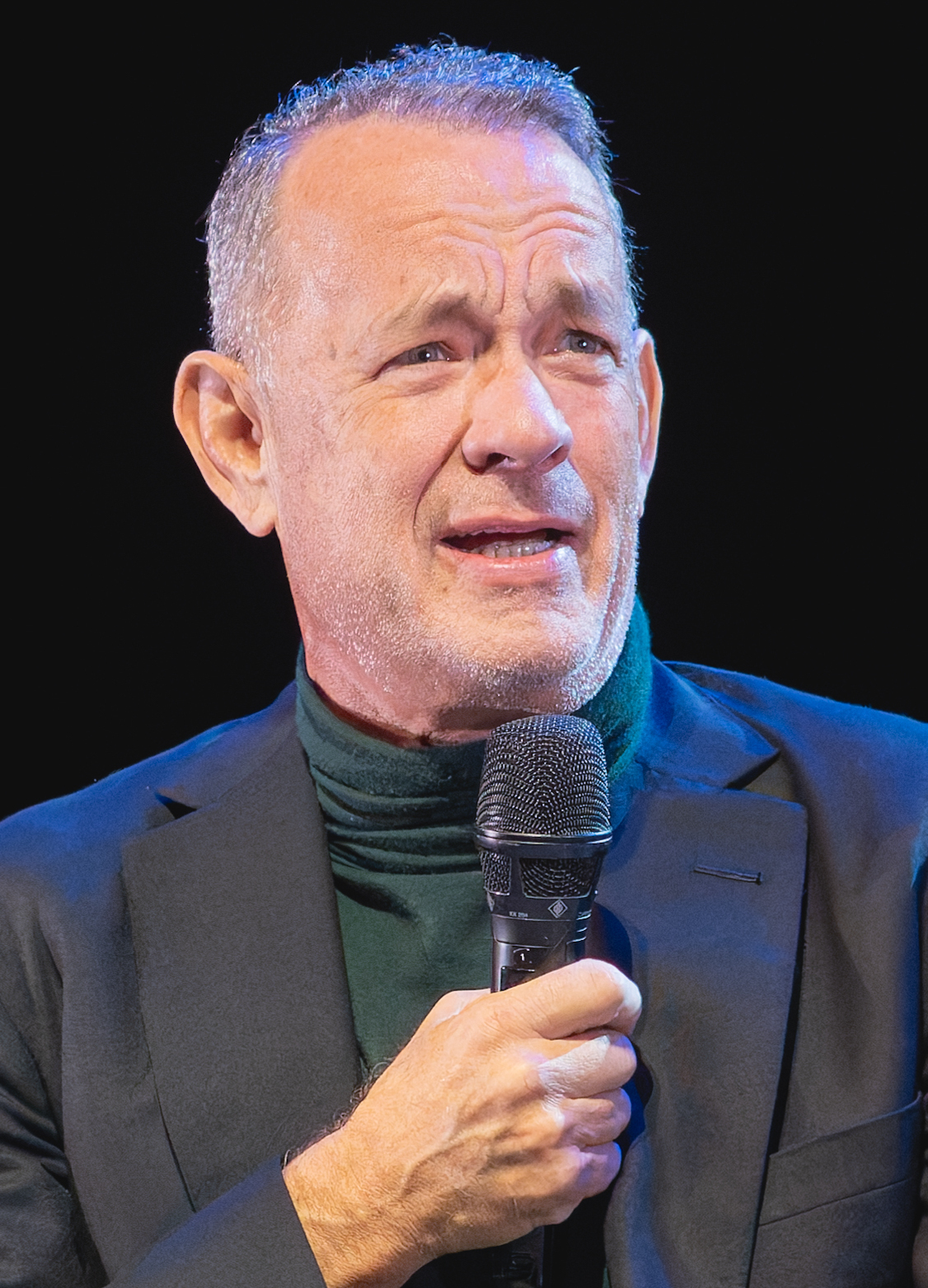
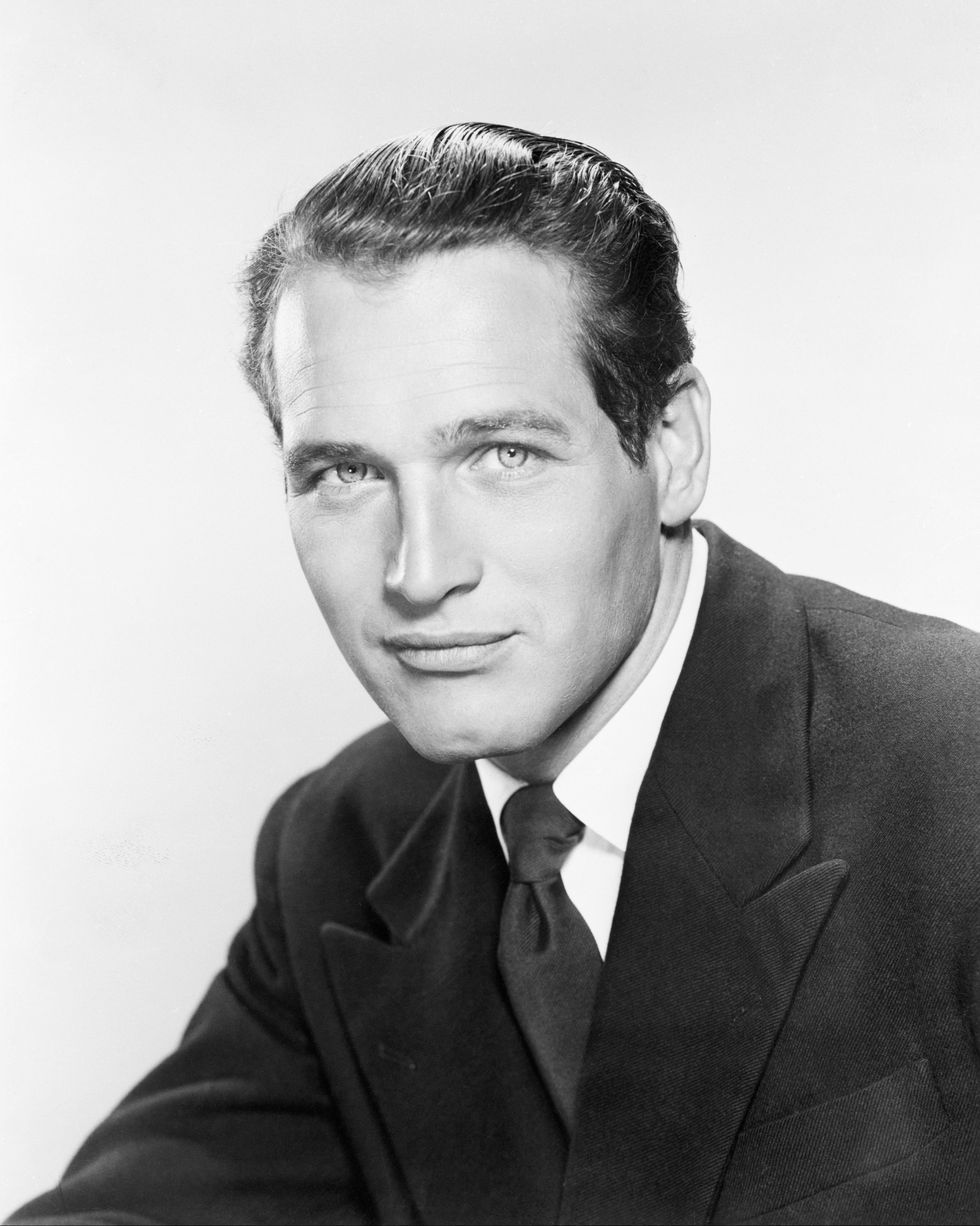
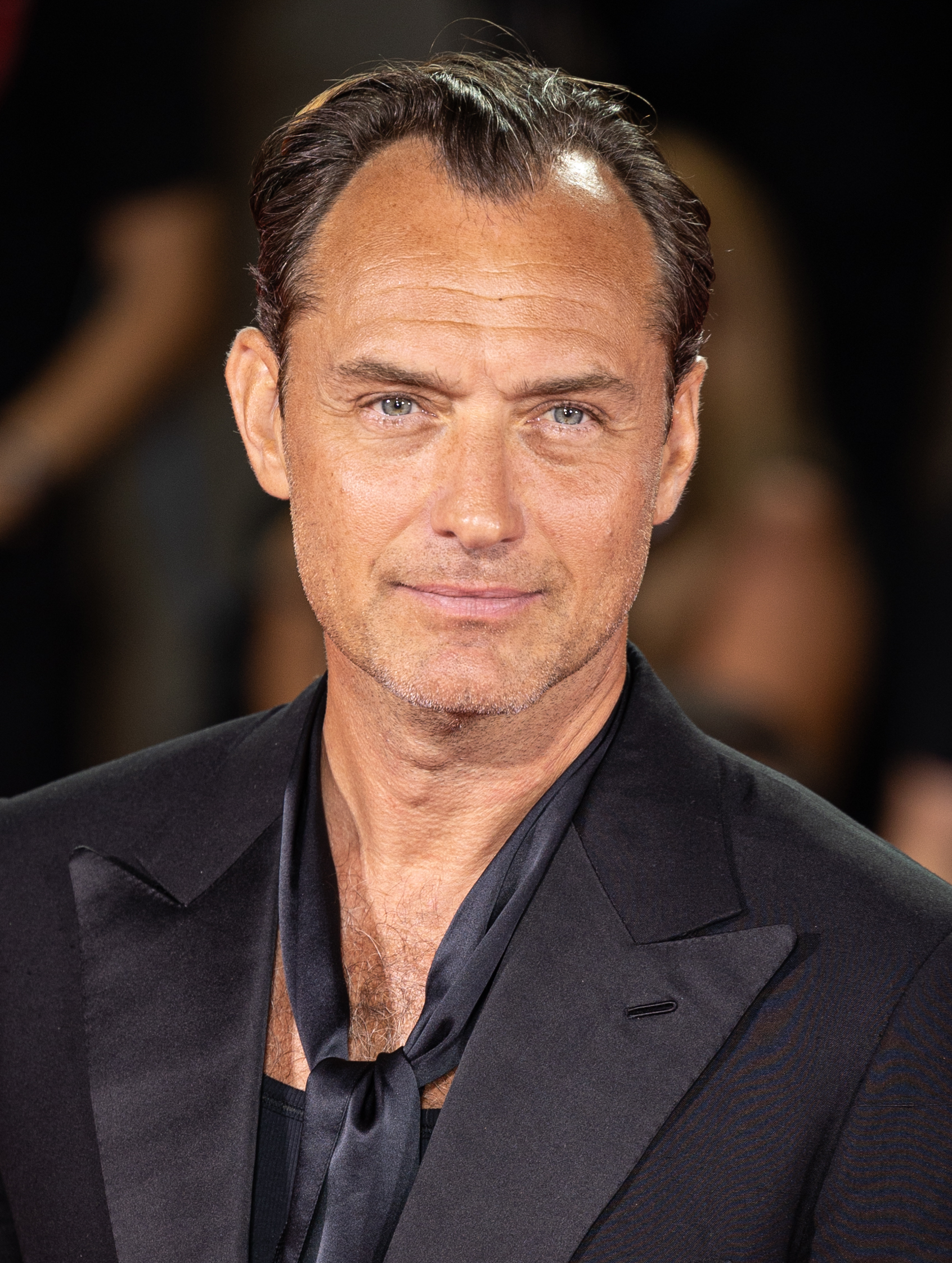
(L to R) Tom Hanks (pictured in 2023), Paul Newman (1958), and Jude Law (2024)
- Tom Hanks as Michael Sullivan Sr.
- Tyler Hoechlin as Michael Sullivan Jr.
- Paul Newman as John Rooney
- Jude Law as Harlen Maguire
- Daniel Craig as Connor Rooney
- Stanley Tucci as Frank Nitti
- Jennifer Jason Leigh as Annie Sullivan
- Liam Aiken as Peter Sullivan
- Dylan Baker as Alexander Rance
- Ciarán Hinds as Finn McGovern
- Doug Spinuzza as Calvino
- David Darlow as Jack Kelly
- Kevin Chamberlin as Frank
- Duane Sharp as Father Callaway
- Diane Dorsey as Aunt Sarah
- Lara Phillips as Ruby
- Harry Groener as Mr. McDougal
- JoBe Cerny as a banker

== Production ==
=== Development ===
When Max Allan Collins wrote the graphic novel Road to Perdition, his book agent saw potential in the story as a film adaptation and showed it to a film agent. By 1999, the novel had reached Dean Zanuck, who was the vice president of development at the company owned by his father, producer Richard D. Zanuck. The novel was sent to the elder Zanuck in Morocco, who was there producing Rules of Engagement (2000). The Zanucks agreed on the story's prospect and sent it to director-producer Steven Spielberg. Shortly afterward, Spielberg set up the project at his studio DreamWorks, though he did not pursue the film's direction due to his full slate.

Sam Mendes sought a new project after completing American Beauty (1999) and explored prospects including A Beautiful Mind, K-PAX, The Shipping News, and The Lookout. DreamWorks sent Mendes Road to Perdition as a prospect, and Mendes was attracted to the story, considering it "narratively very simple, but thematically very complex". Mendes specified one theme being that the parents' world is inaccessible to their children. Mendes considered the story's theme to be about how children deal with violence and whether exposure to violence would render children violent themselves. Mendes described the script as having "no moral absolutes", a factor that appealed to the director.

=== Writing ===
Spielberg first contacted screenwriter David Self to adapt the story into a feature film. Self wrote an initial draft that remained close to the source material and retained most of its dialogue. The screenplay was then rewritten by uncredited writers, distancing the script from the graphic novel but leaving the core elements of the story intact. Some of the harsher aspects of the story were toned down as the script became more streamlined. For example, in some early drafts of the screenplay, Sullivan became an alcoholic, but this element was ultimately absent from the final version.

The story is deeply informed by the Lone Wolf and Cub manga series. Novelist Max Allan Collins acknowledged the influence of Lone Wolf and Cub on his graphic novel Road to Perdition in an interview with the BBC, declaring that "Road To Perdition is 'an unabashed homage' to Lone Wolf and Cub".

Some characters' names were slightly changed from their original versions in the graphic novel: the surname of the real-life gangsters John Looney and his son Connor were changed to Rooney, and the surname of Tom Hanks' character and his family was streamlined from the original O'Sullivan to simply Sullivan. One significant addition to the script was the creation of Maguire to provide a persistent element of pursuit to the Sullivans' departure from the old world.

Hanks and cinematographer Conrad Hall requested Mendes to limit violence in the film to meaningful acts rather than gratuitous carnage. Hanks' character, Michael Sullivan, is known as "The Angel of Death" and invokes fear in those around him, but his infamy is downplayed in the film. Mendes, who described the graphic novel as "much more pulpy", sought to reduce the graphic novel's background to its essence, seeking the "nonverbal simplicity" of films like Once Upon a Time in America (1984), Pat Garrett and Billy the Kid (1973), and films by Akira Kurosawa that lack dialogue. Duplicate language in characters' confrontations in Road to Perdition was trimmed to the absolute minimum. Mendes described Road to Perdition as a "poetic, elegiac story, in which the pictures tell the true story". An example of one such unspoken scene in the film was the piano duet between Rooney and Michael Sr., intended to convey their relationship without words. In the final 20 minutes of Road to Perdition, the script was written to have only six lines of dialogue.

Max Allan Collins originally wanted to write the adapted screenplay, but was not given the opportunity. Collins chose to stay out of the scripting process out of respect for the different writing styles for a different medium, though he served as a consultant. Collins praised the addition of Maguire and considered the minimalist use of dialogue to be appropriate. The author also applauded the film's version of Rooney as "more overtly a father figure" to Sullivan.

Collins opposed the profanity in the script, as the vulgar language did not fit his vision of the 1930s. Collins also contested the path of Sullivan's son in the film. In the graphic novel, the son kills once; in the film, Michael does not kill anyone. Collins also disagreed with the film's narration technique. In the novel, the son narrates the story as an adult, becoming a priest, while in the film, Michael narrates while still a young boy.

=== Casting ===
Tom Hanks was sent a copy of the graphic novel by Steven Spielberg while he was filming Cast Away. Initially too busy to make sense of the story, Hanks later received David Self's adapted screenplay, which he became attached to. Hanks, a father to four children, described Michael Sullivan's role, "I just got this guy. If you're a man, and you've got offspring ... emotionally, it's devastating."

Tyler Hoechlin was chosen from over 2,000 candidates to portray Michael Sullivan's son. The actor was 13 years old while filming. In scenes in which Hoechlin's character assists his father as a getaway driver, Hoechlin is trained by a driving instructor.

Paul Newman was unanimously the first choice for the role of John Rooney. The actor prepared by requesting Frank McCourt, the Irish-American author of Angela's Ashes, to record a tape of his voice.

David Self, who created the Maguire character, explained, "He gets so jaded from exposure to this world, he steps over the line from being the storyteller to being the story maker." To capture the "seedy countenance" of the character, Jude Law was given a sallow skin tone that reflected the wear from working in a darkroom. Law's teeth also received a lower gumline and had a rotted look. Law was also given a weak, thinning hairline. Maguire's apartment also displays a collection of photographs of dead bodies, some of them actual police stills from the 1930s.

Stanley Tucci was selective about roles in gangster films, believing that Hollywood stereotyped Italian-Americans as gangsters. However, attracted by the prospect of working with Mendes, the actor accepted the role of Nitti, a real-life Mob boss from Chicago.

Anthony LaPaglia was cast as Al Capone and filmed a single scene, which was omitted from the final cut, and can be found in the DVD's deleted scenes. Mendes believed that Capone was more menacing as an unseen presence. Actor Alfred Molina was approached to portray Capone, but Molina was forced to turn the role down due to scheduling conflicts with Frida (2002).

=== Filming ===
Mendes sought to produce a period film that avoided gangster genre clichés. Mendes chose to film Road to Perdition on location in Chicago, IL, including downtown at the University Club of Chicago, the Chicago neighborhood of Pullman, the Charles G. Dawes House in Evanston, Illinois, as well as the far west Chicago suburb of Geneva, Illinois. The General Richard L Jones Armory, the state's largest location mainstay, which houses units of the Illinois National Guard, was provided to the studio by the Illinois State Film Commission. Sets were built inside the armory, including the interiors of the Sullivan family's home and the Rooney mansion. The availability of an inside location provided the crew complete control over the lighting environment, which was established with the rigging of scaffoldings.

Atmospherically, the landscape is a violent and magnificent canvas on which is told a mythic story of a father and son in the last period of lawlessness in American history.

— Sam Mendes

Mendes collaborated with costume designer Albert Wolsky, production designer Dennis Gassner, and cinematographer Conrad Hall to design the film's style. Wolsky designed costumes that were "very controlled, with soft outlines and very soft silhouettes." Gassner built sets that could capture the cold look of the era. Mendes sought a muted palette for the film, having dark backgrounds and sets with dark, muted greens and grays. Mendes filmed Road to Perdition using the Super 35 format.

The director filmed exterior scenes in Illinois in the winter and the spring of 2001, using real weather conditions such as snow, rain, and mud for the scenes. Mendes considered the usage of bleak weather conditions and the intended coldness of Gassner's exterior locations to define the characters' emotional states. Pullman became a key location to reflect this theme, having several settings, including the town's historic Florence Hotel, easily redressed by the crew for the film. Filming concluded in June 2001.

=== Cinematography ===
Cinematographer Conrad Hall set up atmospheric lighting similar to that found in the paintings of Edward Hopper

To establish the lighting of scenes in Road to Perdition, Mendes drew from the paintings of Edward Hopper as a source of inspiration, particularly Hopper's New York Movie (1939). Mendes and cinematographer Conrad Hall sought to convey similar atmospheric lighting for the film's scenes, applying a "less is more" mantra. Hall also shot at wide apertures that retained one point in the depth of field sharply focused. Hall considered the technique to provide an emotional dimension to the scenes. The cinematographer also used unconventional techniques and materials to create unique lighting effects. One of Hall's methods was to use black silk in daylight exterior scenes to filter the light enough to create an in-shade look.

Hall purposely distanced the camera from Hanks' character, Michael Sullivan Sr., at the beginning of the film to establish the perspective of Sullivan's son, who is unaware of his father's true nature. Hanks's character was filmed as partially obscured and seen through doorways, and his entrances and exits took place in shadows. A wide lens was used to maintain a distance from the character.

Shots in the film were drawn directly from panels in the graphic novel, illustrated by Richard Piers Rayner. An instance of the direct influence is the scene in which Michael Jr. looks up at the Chicago skyline from the vehicle, with the skyline reflected in the vehicle's glass.

A seamless 40-second driving scene, in which Michael Sullivan and his son travel into Chicago from the countryside, was aided by visual effects. The live-action part of the scene was filmed at LaSalle Street, and due to the lack of scenery for part of the drive down LaSalle Street, the background of Balbo Drive was included with the use of visual effects.

== Themes ==
=== Consequences of violence ===
[What's] important, in this story, is what the violence does to the person who pulls the trigger, and what it has done to them over the years, how it has gradually corroded them. It has rotted their insides.

— Sam Mendes

The film's title, Road to Perdition, is both Michael Sullivan's and his son's destination town and a euphemism for Hell, a road that Sullivan desires to prevent his son from traveling. Sullivan, who chooses his violent path early on in life, considers himself irredeemable and seeks to save his son from a similar fate. Said Mendes, "[Sullivan] is in a battle for the soul of his son. Can a man who has led a bad life achieve redemption through his child?" Hanks described Sullivan as a man who achieved a comfortable status through violent means, whose likely repercussions he ignored. Sullivan is a good father and husband, but also has a job that requires him to be a violent killer. The film explores this paradoxical dichotomy. When Sullivan is faced with the consequences, Hanks says, "At the moment we're dropped into the story, it is literally the last day of that false perspective." To keep Sullivan from justifying his violent actions in the film, Mendes omitted scenes in the final cut that had Sullivan explaining his background to his son.

In the film, most of the numerous acts of violence are committed off-screen. The violent acts were also designed to be quick, reflecting the actual speed of violence in the real world. The focus was not on the direct victims of the perpetuated violence but on the impact of violence on the perpetrators or witnesses to the act.

=== Fathers and sons ===
The film also explores father-son relationships between Michael Sullivan and his son, Sullivan and his boss, John Rooney, and between Rooney and his son Connor. Sullivan simultaneously idolizes and fears Rooney, and Sullivan's son feels the same about his father. Rooney's son, Connor, has none of Sullivan's redeeming qualities, and Rooney is conflicted about whom to protect: his biological son or his surrogate son. Connor is jealous of his father's relationship with Sullivan, which fuels his actions, ultimately causing a domino effect that drives the film.

Because Sullivan shields his background from his son, his attempt to preserve the father-son relationship is actually harmful. Tragedy brings Sullivan and his son together. Sullivan escapes from the old world with his son, and the boy finds an opportunity to strengthen the relationship with his father. Tyler Hoechlin, who portrayed Michael Jr., explained, "His dad starts to realize that Michael is all he has now and how much he's been missing. I think the journey is of a father and son getting to know each other, and also finding out who they themselves are."

=== Rain ===
Rain served as a motif in the film. It was developed after research for the wake scene at the beginning of the film informed the director that corpses were kept on ice in the 1930s to keep bodies from decomposing. The notion was interwoven into the film, which linked the presence of rain with death. Mendes reflected on the theme, "The linking of rain with death ... speaks of the mutability of rain and links to the uncontrollability of fate. These are things that humans can't control."

== Release ==
With filming concluding in June 2001, the studio hoped for a United States release for Thanksgiving or the following Christmas. However, in September 2001, Mendes requested a little bit more time. So it was rescheduled for release this time on July 12, 2002, an unconventional move that placed the drama among the action-oriented summer films.

=== Home media ===
Max Allan Collins, who authored the graphic novel, was hired to write the novelization for the film adaptation. Collins initially turned in a draft that contained 90,000 words, but the licensing at DreamWorks required the author to use only the dialogue from the film and no additional dialogue. Collins reluctantly edited the novelization down to 50,000 words and later said he regretted taking on the task. In 2016, Brash Books published Collins' original version of the novelization as Road to Perdition: The New, Expanded Edition.

Road to Perdition was released on DVD by DreamWorks Home Entertainment on February 25, 2003, in both full screen and anamorphic widescreen versions. The DVD's features included an audio commentary, deleted scenes, an HBO "Making of" documentary, and a photo gallery. Work on the DVD began on the same day the film's production began, and a collaborative effort among the director, the studio, and the DVD production crew shaped the DVD's content. Due to the limited space on the DVD, the film's deleted scenes were chosen over a DTS soundtrack. Instead, the DVD included a Dolby Digital 5.1 soundtrack. A special edition DVD containing both DTS and Dolby Digital 5.1 soundtracks was also released, excluding the "Making of" documentary to fit both soundtracks.

Road to Perdition was released on Blu-ray Disc by Paramount Home Entertainment on August 3, 2010, featuring a widescreen transfer, a DTS-HD Master Audio 5.1 soundtrack, and all of the features from the DVD release.

=== Rights ===
In February 2006, Viacom (now known as Paramount Skydance) acquired the domestic rights to Road to Perdition, along with the rights to all 58 other live-action films DreamWorks had released since 1997, following their $1.6 billion acquisition of the company's live-action assets. In March 2019, the film's international rights transferred to The Walt Disney Company, after Rupert Murdoch sold most of 21st Century Fox's film and television assets to Disney. The film has since been made available to stream on Disney+ in international markets. In the United States, the film was made available on Paramount+.

== Reception ==
=== Box office ===
Road to Perdition opened in 1,798 theaters in its debut weekend, competing against several other new releases, including Reign of Fire, Halloween: Resurrection and The Crocodile Hunter: Collision Course. It ended up grossing $22.1 million, placing second to holdover Men in Black II. The film then beat Men in Black and Stuart Little 2 to reach the number one spot during its second weekend with $15.4 million. It grossed $104 million in the United States and $79.3 million in other territories for a worldwide total of $183.4 million.

=== Critical response ===
Road to Perdition received positive reviews from critics, with Conrad L. Hall's cinematography, the production design, and the lead performances of Hanks and Newman being praised. Review aggregation website Rotten Tomatoes gives the film an approval rating of 82% based on 213 reviews, with an average rating of 7.5/10. The site's critical consensus reads, "Somber, stately, and beautifully mounted, Sam Mendes' Road to Perdition is a well-crafted mob movie that explores the ties between fathers and sons." Metacritic gave the film a weighted average score of 72 out of 100, based on 36 critics, indicating "generally favorable reviews". Audiences polled by CinemaScore gave the film an average grade of "B+" on an A+ to F scale.

Roger Ebert of the Chicago Sun-Times praised Hall's cinematography and the thematic use of water. He also felt emotionally detached from the characters, saying, "I knew I admired it, but I didn't know if I liked it ... It is cold and holds us outside."

Kirk Honeycutt of The Hollywood Reporter praised Hanks, Newman, and Craig but called Law's performance "almost cartoonish". Peter Travers of Rolling Stone also complimented Hanks and Newman: "[They] act together with the confidence of titans, their talents in the service of character, never star ego." Travers cited Hall's "breathtaking" cinematography and composer Thomas Newman's "evocative" score.

Paul Clinton of CNN said: "While these deeply human issues are touched upon, they're never fully explored, and that undermines the sense of greatness to which this movie obviously aspires." Clinton considered Craig's character "one-dimensional to the extreme". He found the cinematography too overpowering for the film's storyline, which he considered "weak". J. Hoberman of The Village Voice described the film as "grim yet soppy". He added: "The action is stilted and the tabloid energy embalmed." Stephen Hunter of The Washington Post thought that the script lost its path when Sullivan and his son fled their old life.

Eleanor Ringel Gillespie of The Atlanta Journal-Constitution enjoyed the film's cinematography, Depression-era setting, and the performances of Hanks and Newman. Gillespie wished the film lasted a little longer to explore its emotional core further. Eric Harrison of the Houston Chronicle considered Road to Perdition "the most brilliant work in this [gangster] genre" since the uncut Once Upon a Time in America (1984). Harrison considered Self's script "so finely honed that the story can change directions in a heartbeat."

=== Accolades ===
Award	Category	Recipient	Result
Academy Awards	Best Supporting Actor	Paul Newman	Nominated
Academy Awards	Best Art Direction	Dennis Gassner and Nancy Haigh	Nominated
Academy Awards	Best Cinematography	Conrad L. Hall (posthumous)	Won
Academy Awards	Best Original Score	Thomas Newman	Nominated
Academy Awards	Best Sound	Scott Millan, Bob Beemer and John Pritchett	Nominated
Academy Awards	Best Sound Editing	Scott Hecker	Nominated
British Academy Film Awards	Best Actor in a Supporting Role	Paul Newman	Nominated
British Academy Film Awards	Best Cinematography	Conrad Hall (posthumous)	Won
British Academy Film Awards	Best Production Design	Dennis Gassner	Won
Golden Globe Awards	Best Supporting Actor – Motion Picture	Paul Newman	Nominated
American Society of Cinematographers	Outstanding Achievement in Cinematography	Conrad Hall (posthumous)	Won
Critics' Choice Movie Awards	Top 10 Films		5th place
Critics' Choice Movie Awards	Best Picture		Nominated
Critics' Choice Movie Awards	Best Supporting Actor	Paul Newman	Nominated
Critics' Choice Movie Awards	Best Young Performer	Tyler Hoechlin	Nominated
Saturn Awards	Best Action/Adventure/Thriller Film		Won
Saturn Awards	Best Young Actor	Tyler Hoechlin	Won

In April 2006, Empire recognized Road to Perdition as No. 6 on its list of the top 20 comic book films.

== Canceled sequel ==
In 2008, Collins was attached to write and direct a sequel, which would adapt Road to Purgatory. In 2011, Collins reported that the sequel had not yet received funding or official green light.

== Works cited ==
- Oxoby, Marc (2002). "Road To Perdition (Mendes 2002)". Film & History: An Interdisciplinary Journal of Film and Television Studies. 32 (2): 110–112.
