= Reb Spikes =

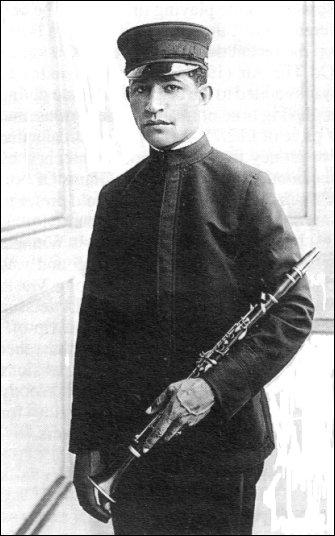

Background information
- Born: Benjamin Franklin Spikes; October 31, 1888
- Origin: Dallas, Texas, United States
- Died: February 24, 1982 (aged 93)
- Genres: Jazz
- Occupations: Musician, songwriter, producer, publisher
- Instruments: Saxophone, clarinet, trombone, drums, piano

Benjamin Franklin "Reb" Spikes (October 31, 1888 – February 24, 1982) was an American jazz saxophonist and entrepreneur. His composition with his brother John, "Someday Sweetheart", has become an often-recorded jazz standard.

== Biography ==
Benjamin Franklin "Reb" Spikes was born in Dallas, Texas on October 31, 1888. Spikes was born into an African American family, and also had Irish, French, Norwegian and Native American heritage. Nicknamed "Rebel" since childhood, the name was eventually shortened to "Reb". His family moved to Los Angeles in 1897, where Spikes worked on building sites before moving to San Francisco in 1907.

Almost all of Spikes's siblings were pianists, but for a long time, Spikes preferred painting to music. He eventually took up music when his brother John bought him a set of drums. The brothers started touring the Southwest and Midwest as a piano and drums duo. Reb learned to play several instruments, including the saxophone, the clarinet, the trombone, and some piano. In 1913 the brothers joined McCabe's Georgia Troubadours.

In 1914, Spikes returned to San Francisco and was hired as baritone saxophonist in Sidney LeProtti's "The So Different Jazz Band". Spikes was billed as "The World's Greatest saxophonist" on the band's performances.

Spikes returned to Los Angeles in 1919 and worked with his brother John in a music shop. At the time, the Spikes' music shop was one of the few places on the West Coast that sold jazz records, and many local musicians used to hang out at the store. The brothers also published music and had their own record company (Sunshine). Kid Ory's Creole Orchestra recorded for them in June 1921 (as "Spikes' Seven Pods of Pepper"), making the first commercial jazz recordings by a black New Orleans band.

Spikes composed "Someday Sweetheart" with his brother John in 1919. Jelly Roll Morton recorded it in 1923 and again in 1926, and the song has become a popular jazz standard. The Spikes brothers also wrote lyrics for Morton's "Wolverine Blues" and "Froggie Moore Rag".

In the 1930s, Spikes worked as a promoter and worked with Les Hite and Lionel Hampton, both of whom were his former sidemen. He also took part in Jelly Roll Morton's comeback in 1940–1941. Morton and Spikes were planning on starting a publishing business, but their plans were ended when Morton got ill and subsequently died in 1941.

Spikes died in Los Angeles on February 24, 1982.
