= John Spikes =

American jazz musician

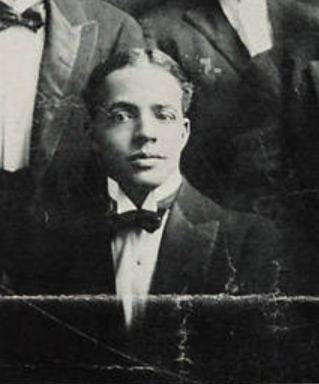

Background information
- Born: John Curry Spikes; July 22, 1881
- Origin: Dallas, Texas, United States
- Died: June 28, 1955 (aged 73)
- Genres: Jazz
- Occupations: Musician, songwriter, producer, publisher

John Curry Spikes (July 22, 1881 – June 28, 1955) was an American jazz musician and entrepreneur.

Along with his brother Reb Spikes, John ran a traveling show band in early 1900s. At one point, Jelly Roll Morton was a member of the band. The Spikes brothers were performing in San Francisco around 1915, under the name The Original So-Different Orchestra, with Reb Spikes billed as the "World's Greatest Saxophonist". Around 1919, they settled in Los Angeles, where they started a music store, a nightclub, an agency and a publishing house.

They were the first to record an all-black jazz band in 1922. In 1927, they shot a short sound film that predated The Jazz Singer, the first full-length sound film. Their most enduring musical collaborations were writing the lyrics to Morton's Wolverine Blues and their own composition, Someday Sweetheart, which has become a jazz standard.
